= Joseph Strub =

Alsatian missionary priest and university founder (1833–1890)

The Rev. Joseph Strub CSSp
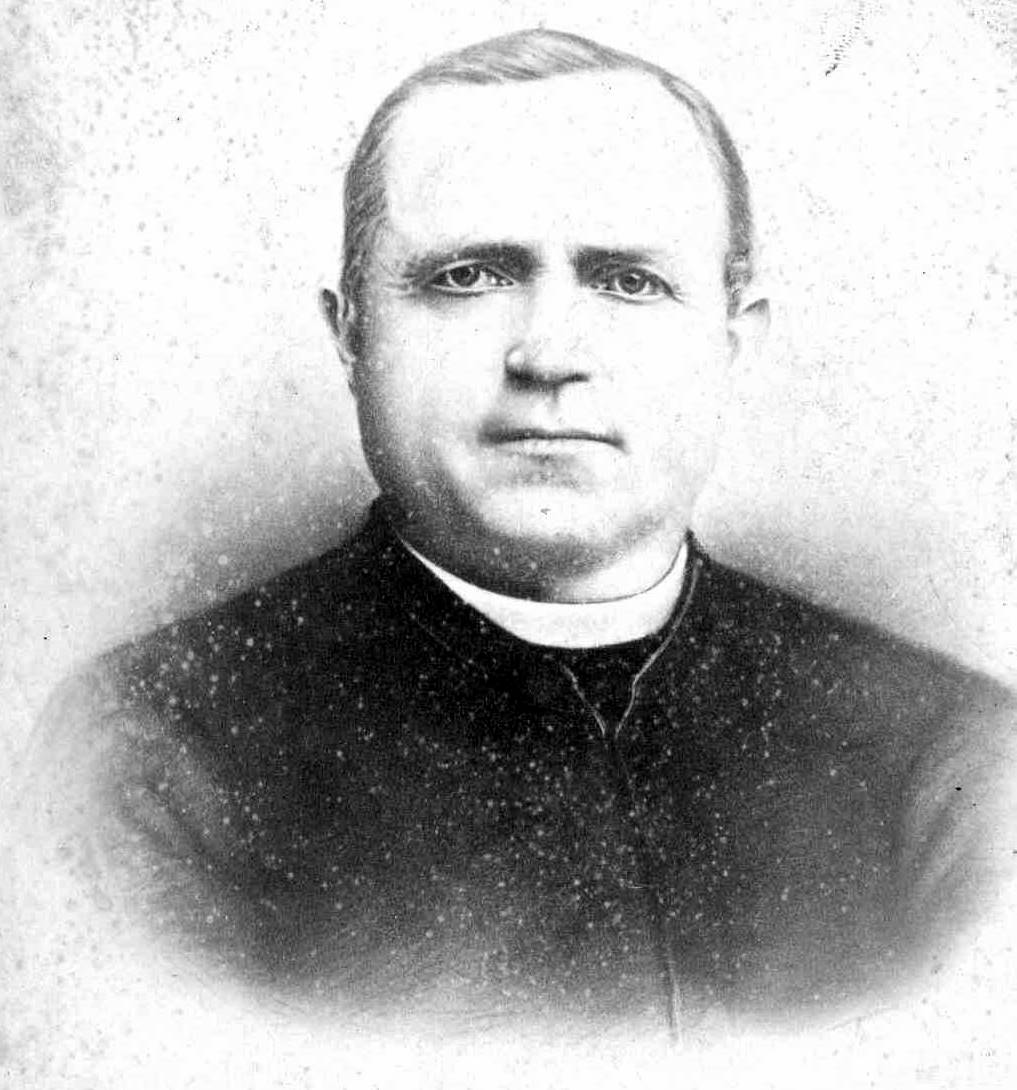
- Born: November 1, 1833; Strasbourg, Alsace, Kingdom of France
- Died: January 27, 1890 (aged 57); Pittsburgh, Pennsylvania
- Church: Roman Catholic Church
- Ordained: 1858 in Dakar, Senegal

Joseph Strub, C.S.Sp. (November 1, 1833 – January 27, 1890), an Alsatian missionary priest with the Congregation of the Holy Ghost, was the founder of what is today Duquesne University, which was called the Pittsburgh Catholic College of the Holy Ghost until 1911.

== Missionary work and distinction in Europe ==
Joseph Strub was born in Strasbourg, Alsace-Lorraine on November 1, 1833. While studying to become a Holy Ghost Father, he was given permission to do missionary work in West Africa. He worked there from 1857 to 1863, being ordained a priest in 1858 in Dakar, Senegal. He became the Vicar General to Mgr. Kobes, the Vice Superior of Dakar, and subsequently the provincial superior at Marienthal and Marienstatt Abbeys in Westerwald, Germany. He was Chaplain General of the French prisoners at Mainz during the Franco-Prussian War, and became an intimate friend of Marshal Patrice de Mac-Mahon. He was rewarded for his services by the French government with the Cross of the Legion of Honor.

== Expulsion from Germany ==
Strub and his order were expelled from Germany during Otto von Bismarck's Kulturkampf in 1872. Strub and five priests moved to Ohio, but relocated a few years later after hearing of a demand for German priests in Pittsburgh, Pennsylvania.

In April 1874, the Bishop of Pittsburgh, Michael Domenec, assigned Strub to St. Mary's Church in Sharpsburg, hoping that the parish could serve as a place to open a school for Catholic men. Three attempts to open a college in Pittsburgh had already failed, so Strub was reluctant. He accepted the order, however, hoping that the establishment could serve as a scholasticate for the Holy Ghost Fathers (despite the Congregation's desire that all Holy Ghost fathers be educated in France). The establishment of the college was delayed for two years by complications surrounding the Holy See's creation of a Diocese of Allegheny, as Bishop John Tuigg became the new bishop of Pittsburgh.

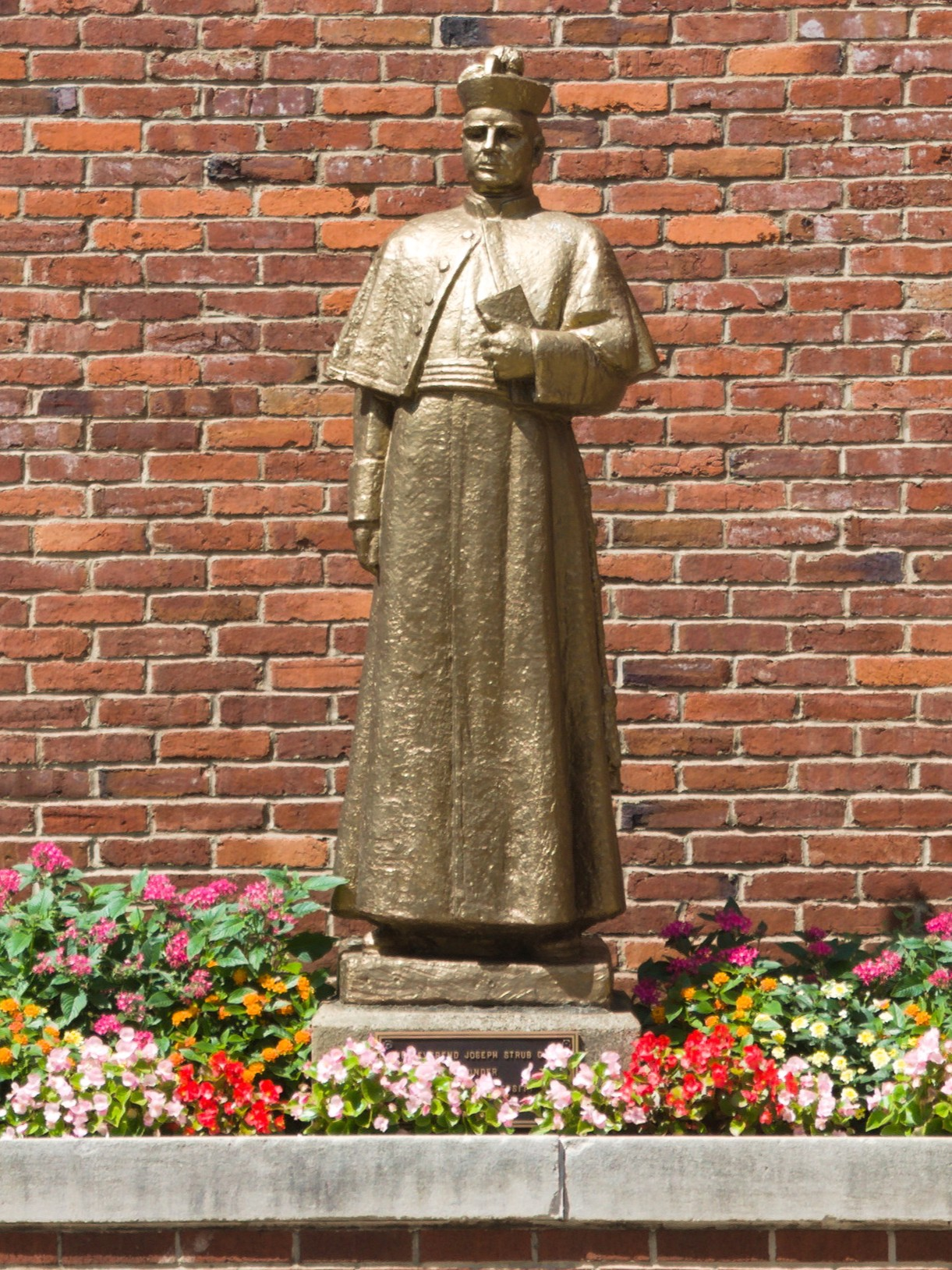
A statue of Fr. Strub outside the Old Main administration building at Duquesne University.

== Opening a college ==
Finally, in 1878, Bishop Tuigg gave Strub permission to open a college in Pittsburgh, though he allocated no resources towards its foundation: no building, land, nor money was available. All Tuigg promised was a recommendation to the parishes of the diocese. Strub also wrote the Superior General in Paris for personnel, writing, "Be careful to send no one without English. You have no idea how useful the English language is here. I might even say necessary!" Despite a dispute concerning the choice of Irish Spiritan William Power as the new college's rector (Strub believed an Irishman would not be viewed as hard-working as a German in Pittsburgh), the second and third floors of a bakery were leased on the corner of Wylie Avenue and Federal Street in downtown Pittsburgh as a temporary location for the college.

Strub and his fellow Spiritans established the Pittsburgh Catholic College of the Holy Ghost on October 1, 1878, a month behind schedule. Bishop Tuigg did not provide the support he had promised, having learned that the interim rector while Power arrived was a German priest, and only forty students constituted the first class. In order to avoid provoking the bishop further, Strub left for Arkansas, only two weeks after establishing the Pittsburgh Catholic College, hoping to bring the Spiritan influence to that state.

== Mission in Arkansas ==
Having heard Little Rock Bishop Edward Fitzgerald's call for more Roman Catholic clergy in Arkansas, Strub visited the state and wrote Bishop Fitzgerald obtaining permission to found St. Joseph Colony in Conway. The Little Rock and Fort Smith Railroad granted the mission several hundred thousand acres of land from Marche and Atkins. In January 1879, Strub moved the mission to Morrilton, since the location was more central. In 1880, Strub wrote Der Leitstern (English: The Guiding Star), a German-language pamphlet that encouraged immigrants to settle in the colony. By 1889, ninety-five Catholic families had settled near Morrilton. A drought in the mid-1880s stymied immigration, but the mission persisted. However, the Holy Ghost Fathers's novitiate moved to Pittsburgh in 1884, and the school and church in Morrilton were destroyed by a tornado in 1892. Strub died on January 27, 1890, while on a visit to Pittsburgh.

== Notes and references ==
Works cited

- Metrailer, Jamie (September 27, 2007), "St. Joseph Colony", The Encyclopedia of Arkansas History and Culture, The Central Arkansas Library System
- "Obituary: The Very Rev. Joseph Strub" (PDF), The New York Times, New York, January 28, 1890
- "Reverend Father Strub (sculpture)", Art Inventory Catalog, Smithsonian Institution, 2004
- Rishel, Joseph F.; Demilio, Paul (1997), "The Spirit That Gives Life": The History of Duquesne University, 1878–1996, Pittsburgh, Pennsylvania: Duquesne University Press, ISBN 0-8207-0268-4
- Snyder, James L (December 1952). "Duquesne University, 1878–1953". Catholic Educational Review. Vol. 50. pp. 649–665.
