= John Ambrose Watterson =

American Catholic bishop

His Excellency, The Right Reverend John Ambrose Watterson
- Bishop of Columbus
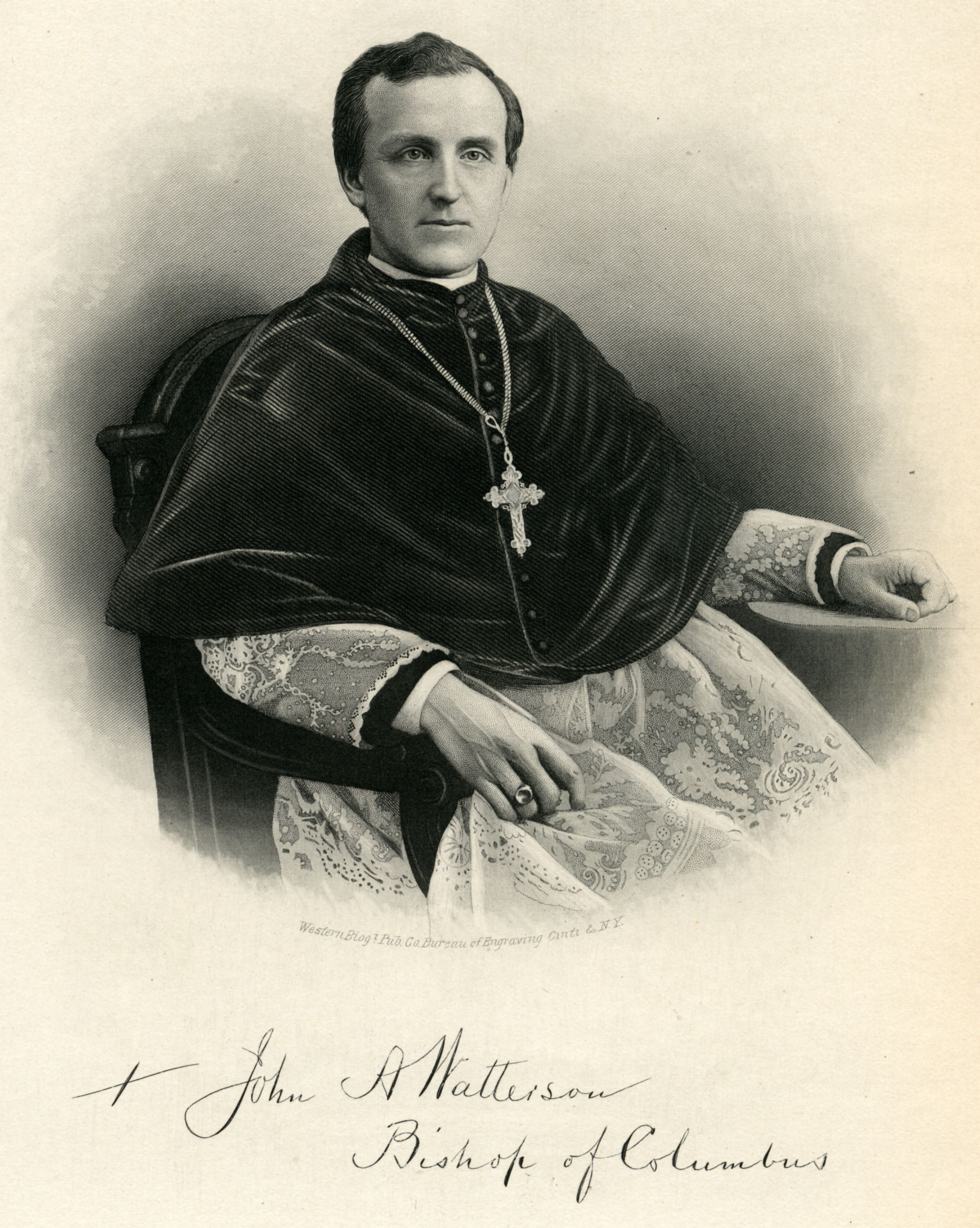
- Church: Roman Catholic Church
- Diocese: Diocese of Columbus
- In office: August 8, 1880 – April 17, 1899
- Predecessor: Sylvester Horton Rosecrans
- Successor: Henry K. Moeller

Orders
- Ordination: August 9, 1868 by Michael Domenec
- Consecration: August 8, 1880 by William Henry Elder, William George McCloskey, John Tuigg

Personal details
- Born: May 27, 1844 Blairsville, Pennsylvania, US
- Died: April 17, 1899 (aged 54) Columbus, Ohio, US
- Motto: Mors christi vita meaning (The death of Christ is life)

John Ambrose Watterson (May 27, 1844 – April 17, 1899) was an American prelate of the Catholic Church. He served as bishop of the Diocese of Columbus in Ohio from 1880 until his death in 1899.

== Biography ==
=== Early life ===
The sixth of eleven children, John Watterson was born on May 27, 1844, in Blairsville, Pennsylvania, to John Sylvester and Sarah Salome (née McAfee) Watterson. His father's family came to the United States from the Isle of Man in the British Isles in 1762; originally Episcopalians, his grandfather was orphaned in 1781 and subsequently raised by a Catholic family in York County, Pennsylvania. His mother's family was from County Armagh, Ireland, and settled in Westmoreland County, Pennsylvania. John's parents frequently offered their home as a place of rest to traveling missionaries, and their house even became known as "The Priest's Hotel".

After attending the parochial school of Sts. Simon and Jude Parish in Blairsville, Watterson was sent to St. Vincent's College in Latrobe, Pennsylvania, at a young age. In 1861, he entered Mount St. Mary's Seminary at Emmitsburg, Maryland, where he earned a Bachelor of Arts degree with high honors.

=== Priesthood ===
Watterson was ordained to the priesthood for the Diocese of Columbus by Bishop Michael Domenec on August 9, 1868, at St. Vincent's Abbey in Latrobe. Watterson then served as professor of moral theology and Scripture at Mount St. Mary's, where he became vice president in 1877 and later president in 1879. He earned a Doctor of Divinity degree from Georgetown College in Washington, D.C. in June 1879.

=== Bishop of Columbus ===
On March 14, 1880, Watterson was appointed the second bishop of Columbus by Pope Leo XIII. He received his episcopal consecration on August 8, 1880, from Archbishop William Elder, with Bishops William McCloskey and John Tuigg serving as co-consecrators. During his 19-year-long tenure, Watterson increased the number of priests and schools in the diocese, founded two hospitals and erected many new missions and parishes.

Watterson was a strong supporter of the temperance movement, a national initiative against alcohol abuse. He prohibited saloon owners from holding office in any Catholic organization in the diocese. When he conducted confirmation ceremonies, he required the children to promise to abstain from alcohol consumption until they reached age 21. Watterson was the first Catholic bishop ever to speak at Ohio State University in Columbus.

In 1887, Watterson purchased the former home of the financier William G. Deshler, which adjoined the cathedral, to serve as a rectory. This building housed the bishops of the diocese until 1949

=== Death ===
John Watterson died in Columbus unexpectedly on April 17, 1899, at age 54. He is buried at Mount Calvary Cemetery in Columbus. Bishop Watterson High School in Columbus, Ohio, is named in his honor. He is also one of the featured persons of the Washington Gladden Social Justice Park in downtown Columbus.

Catholic Church titles
Preceded by Sylvester Horton Rosecrans	Bishop of Columbus; 1880–1899	Succeeded by Henry K. Moeller
