= Bishop Canevin High School =

Jesuit high school in Pittsburgh, Pennsylvania

Location
- 2700 Morange Road; Pittsburgh, Allegheny County, Pennsylvania 15205; United States; 40°25′23″N 80°4′15″W

Information
- Type: Private School, Coeducational
- Motto: A.M.D.G (Ad Maiorem Dei Gloriam)
- Religious affiliation: Catholic
- Established: 1959
- Founder: Bishop John Dearden
- School district: Roman Catholic Diocese of Pittsburgh
- Authority: Pittsburgh Diocese
- Superintendent: Lauren Martin
- CEEB code: 393647
- President: Brian Fernandes
- Principal: Michael Palcsey
- Chaplain: Fr. Ken and Jacob
- Grades: 9–12
- Average class size: 13
- Colors: Columbia blue, Navy blue, and white
- Fight song: On Crusaders!
- Sports: Football: Section Championships: 1977, 1979, 1983, 1988, 1994, 2000, 2004, 2005, 2010, 2011, 2022 Football WPIAL Championships: 1990, 2021 Girls Volleyball: Section Championships: 1989, 1997, 1998, 1999, 2009, 2010, 2011, 2012, 2013, 2014, 2016, 2017, 2018, 2019, 2020, 2021, 2022, 2023, 2024 WPIAL Championships: 2013, 2015, 2017, 2018, 2019, 2020, 2021 PIAA Championships: 2015 Golf: Section Championships: 1988, 1990, 1991, 1998, 1999, 2004, 2006, 2007, 2008, 2009, 2021, 2024 Boys Soccer: Section Championships: 2009, 2012 Girls Soccer: Section Championships: 1996, 2012, 2013, 2020, 2021 Boys Basketball: Section Championships: 2006, 2016, 2017, 2020, 2021, 2022, 2023, 2024, 2025, 2026 WPIAL Championships: 2021, 2022 PIAA Championships: 2022 Girls Basketball: Section Championships: 1985, 1994, 1997, 1998, 2006, 2008, 2017, 2018, 2019, 2020, 2023 WPIAL Championships: 2013, 2016, 2017, 2018, 2020, 2022 PIAA Championships: 2013 Hockey: Conference Champions: 2003, 2008, 2009, 2010, 2013, 2014, 2022, 2023, 2024 Penguins Cup Champions: 1983, 1984, 1985, 1989, 1993, 2011, 2014, 2016 PIHL Champions: 1983, 1984, 1989, 2011 Baseball: Section Championships: 1975,1976,1977,1978, 1991, 1992, 1993, 1994, 1995, 1996, 1997, 1998, 2000, 2001, 2002, 2003, 2006, 2014, 2025 WPIAL Championships: 1993, 2000, 2023, 2024 Softball: Section Championships: 1990, 1992, 1993, 1994, 1995, 1996, 1999, 2000, 2001, 2002, 2009, 2010 WPIAL Championships: 1990, 1999 PIAA Championships: 1999
- Mascot: Crusader
- Rival: Seton LaSalle
- Accreditation: Middle States Association of Colleges and Schools
- Yearbook: Mosaic
- Website: bishopcanevin.org

Bishop Canevin High School is a Jesuit-inspired high school in Pittsburgh, Pennsylvania, United States. The school is located in the East Carnegie neighborhood of the city.

== History ==
In 1958, Bishop John Dearden, Bishop of Pittsburgh, announced plans for a brand new co-institutional diocesan high school to serve the Chartiers Valley on Morange Road, next to St. Paul Orphanage, which is now St. Paul Seminary. The school was to be named Chartiers Catholic High School. The name was changed soon after to recognize former Bishop of Pittsburgh Regis Canevin. Father Leo G. Henry was then named the first headmaster. Canevin High School opened to 435 boys and girls on September 10, 1959; in June 1963, 303 students graduated. Construction on the building was not yet finished, and would not for at least another six months. The faculty was made up of priests, five communities of nuns, and a small number of laypeople. Since it was a co-institutional school, there were different faculties and facilities for the boys and girls. However, there was one administration and the boys and girls were free to mix in a few locations, such as the science labs and the library; Latin 3-4 and one of the advanced math classes were coeducational due to the small class sizes. The band/orchestra was also coed. Remnants of this system can be found in the numbering patterns for the rooms (G101 for first floor Girls' wing and B101 for first floor Boy's wing). Tuition was free to the students, as long as they were a member of the 21 parishes which made up the Canevin district.

In 1961, the diocese signed a contract with the Immaculate Conception Province of the Order of Friars Minor Conventual to take over the administration and boy's faculty. Sent to Canevin were an original group of 8 friars, led by Fr. Gervase M. Beyer, O.F.M. Conv. They were soon supplanted with more friars from Trenton Catholic High School, which had recently closed. After the 1962 school year, Fr. Gervase became headmaster and oversaw the first Middle States accreditation of Canevin in 1965.

The 1970s saw several headmasters. In 1969, Fr. Gervase left Canevin and was replaced by Fr. Canice Connors O.F.M. Conv. Under his guidance, Canevin became fully coeducational, and boys and girls began to have classes together. After Fr. Canice, Fr. Julian Zambanini O.F.M. Conv. became headmaster; followed by Fr. Robert Sochor, O.F.M Conv. After Fr. Robert, the Diocese of Pittsburgh assumed responsibility for the administration of the school from the friars. At that time, Fr. Donald Sotak became headmaster. After the 1978–79 school year, Mr. John Maurer became headmaster, the first lay headmaster of any Pittsburgh Diocesan high School. Maurer guided the school through its 25th anniversary in 1984. However, in 1980, the Franciscans that had served the school for 19 years moved on to other duties.

In 1987, due to the common misconception that Canevin was a public school, Maurer changed the name of the school to Canevin Catholic High School. During his tenure as Principal, Mr. Kenneth Sinagra changed the name of the school to Bishop Canevin High School, to honor the school’s namesake, Bishop Regis Canevin, Pittsburgh’s first “native-born” Bishop.

== Notable alumni ==
- Tom Clements 1971
- Anita Astorino Kulik 1982
- Dan Deasy 1984
- Jim Bolla 1970
- Jesse Joyce 1996
- Matthew Stocke 1990
- Chris Deluzio 2002
