= Hugh Charles Boyle =

American prelate

His Excellency, The Most Reverend Hugh Charles Boyle
- Bishop of Pittsburgh
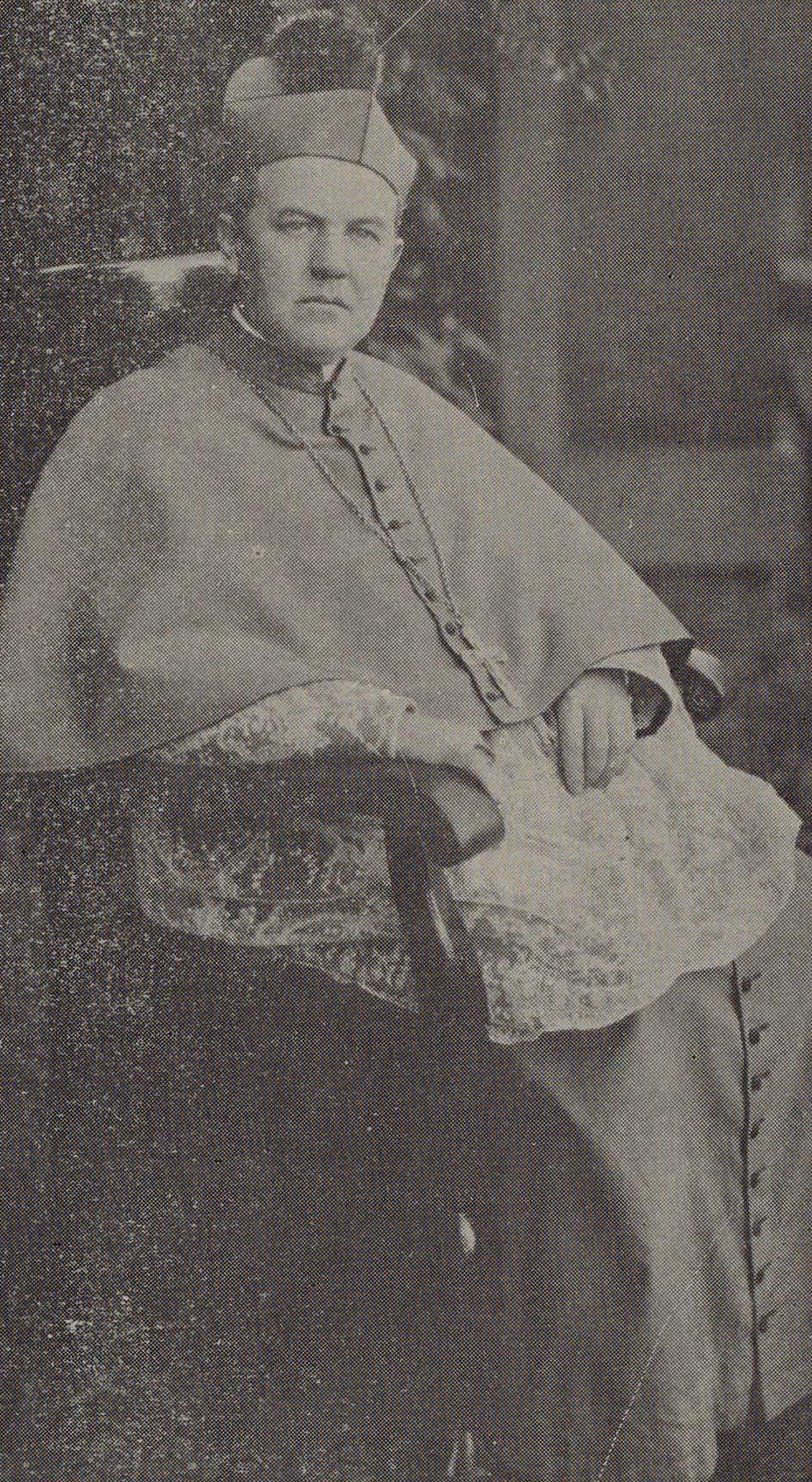
- See: Diocese of Pittsburgh
- Installed: June 29, 1921
- Term ended: December 22, 1950
- Predecessor: Regis Canevin
- Successor: John Dearden

Orders
- Ordination: July 2, 1898 by Richard Phelan
- Consecration: June 29, 1921 by Regis Canevin

Personal details
- Born: October 8, 1873 Johnstown, Pennsylvania, U.S.
- Died: December 22, 1950 (aged 77) Pittsburgh, Pennsylvania, U.S.
- Denomination: Catholic
- Education: Saint Vincent Seminary
- Motto: Quod deus volt (What God wants)

Styles of Hugh Boyle
- Reference style: The Most Reverend
- Spoken style: Your Excellency
- Religious style: Bishop

Hugh Charles Boyle (October 8, 1873 – December 22, 1950) was an American prelate of the Catholic Church. He served as bishop of the Diocese of Pittsburgh in Pennsylvania from 1921 until his death in 1950.

== Biography ==
=== Early life ===
Hugh Boyle was born on October 8, 1873, in Johnstown, Pennsylvania, one of nine children of Charles and Anna (née Keelan) Boyle. His father was an Irish immigrant who worked as a coal miner. He received his early education at local parochial schools, and enrolled at St. Vincent College in Latrobe at age 14. During the 1889 Johnstown Flood, his father and most of his siblings drowned; only his mother and one brother survived. He began his studies for the priesthood at St. Vincent Seminary, also in Latrobe, in 1891.

=== Priesthood ===
Boyle was ordained a priest in Latrobe for the Diocese of Pittsburgh by Bishop Richard Phelan on July 2, 1898. After his ordination, the diocese assigned Boyle as a curate at St. Aloysius Parish in Wilmerding, Pennsylvania, where he remained for five years. He then served at the Cathedral of St. Paul Parish in Pittsburgh, Pennsylvania, and as secretary to Bishop Regis Canevin. In 1909, Canevin appointed Boyle as superintendent of diocesan schools. From 1916 to 1921, he served as pastor of St. Mary Magdalene Parish in Homestead, Pennsylvania.

=== Bishop of Pittsburgh ===
On June 16, 1921, Boyle was appointed the sixth bishop of Pittsburgh by Pope Benedict XV. He received his episcopal consecration at Saint Paul Cathedral on June 29, 1921, from Canevin, with Bishops Philip R. McDevitt and John McCort serving as co-consecrators.

During his 29-year tenure, Boyle earned a reputation as one of the leading Catholic educators in the nation. He sponsored a comprehensive school-building program in the diocese, asking the Brothers of the Christian Schools to establish Central Catholic High School in Pittsburgh He was a supporter of social justice movements, such as the Catholic Radical Alliance. In 1941, Boyels established the Catholic Workers' School in Pittsburgh.

During World War II, Boyle served as chairman of the National Catholic Welfare Council's Committee for Polish Relief. He defended the Allied bombing of Rome as a wartime necessity and praised the care that the Army Air Corps took to protect the city's religious and cultural treasures. Boyle also played a prominent role in the national Legion of Decency and was a member of the Episcopal Committee on Motion Pictures.

=== Death and legacy ===
Hugh Boyle died on December 22, 1950, at Mercy Hospital in Pittsburgh at age 77. He is buried in St. Mary Cemetery in the city's Lawrenceville neighborhood.

Catholic Church titles
Preceded by Regis Canevin	Bishop of Pittsburgh; 1921–1950	Succeeded by John Dearden
