= Saint Joseph High School (Natrona Heights, Pennsylvania) =

Location
- 800 Montana Avenue; Natrona Heights, (Allegheny County), Pennsylvania 15065; United States; 40.620764°N 79.727512°W

Information
- Type: Private, Coeducational
- Religious affiliation: Catholic
- Patron saint: Saint Joseph
- Established: 1915
- Founder: Bishop Regis Canevin
- Status: Open
- School district: Highlands School District
- CEEB code: 392855
- Principal: Beverly Kaniecki
- Grades: 9–12
- Enrolment: 160
- Average class size: 50
- Colors: Scarlet, and Royal Blue
- Athletics: Basketball, Swimming, Volleyball, Track, Baseball, Softball, Golf, Bowling, Tennis, Soccer, Cheerleading
- Athletics conference: WPIAL (PIAA District 7)
- Team name: Spartans
- Rival: Springdale
- Accreditation: Middle States Association of Colleges and Schools
- Website: www.saintjosephhs.com

Saint Joseph High School is a private, parochial Catholic high school in Harrison Township, Pennsylvania. It is the only parish-operated high school in the Diocese of Pittsburgh.

== History ==
Saint Joseph High School was established in 1915 by Bishop Regis Canevin as part of Saint Joseph Church, a parish in Natrona, Pennsylvania. Originally, the high school only housed 9th and 10th grade students until becoming a four year institution in 1922.

The school opened the Walter Dlubak Athletic Center in 2009, home to the SJHS Spartans; math and science classes are also held in the building. It shares its main school building with Our Lady of the Most Blessed Sacrament School, an elementary school for grades Pre-K through 8

In September 2015, Saint Joseph High School celebrated their Centennial which continued with other celebrations throughout the 2015-16 school year. Some of these included the rental of a snow cone truck, a pilgrimage to see Pope Francis in Philadelphia, Pennsylvania, pep rallies, and a special red centennial school uniform sweater with the centennial logo.

== Traditions ==
On the first day of each new school year, SJHS holds a Moving in Ceremony, in which new students are welcomed into the school community. A few days later, the students travel to Harrison Hills Park for an all school picnic. This picnic formerly contained a freshman vs. senior football game until it was cancelled in 2015 and replaced that same year with a class-against-class whiffle ball tournament.

On the Wednesday before Thanksgiving, the students enjoy an 11:30 dismissal as the previous year's senior class returns to the school to collect yearbooks and reconnect with underclassman friends still at St. Joe's. Following the shortened school day, the underclassman face off against the seniors in the annual Turkey Bowl football game, a tradition that has lasted over 30 years.

On the last night before the students leave for Christmas vacation, the school semi-formal dance is held. As Saint Joseph lacks a football team and thus has no homecoming dance, this dance holds much prestige among the students.

In May, the freshman and sophomores each hold separate parties for the senior class, known as F&S and S&S respectively, as their "going away" celebrations. The junior class funds and organizes the junior-senior prom.

The last day of school is an 11:30 dismissal, and is also Moving Up Day. As the senior class has already graduated, the juniors are called upon to become the new leaders of the school, while each class is recognized to have "moved up" into the next grade.

== Alma mater ==
All hail to St. Joe's High! Noble and strong.
Through the dear portals lies the truth of our song.
Fly thy colors, red and blue, Wisdom echoing.
Lead on, O guiding light, of thee we sing.

All hail to St. Joe's High! Our voices raise.
To the Alma Mater, the tribute of our praise.
Live, O Alma Mater! Humble hearts we bring.
Bearer of truth and light of thee we sing.

This is sung by the student body at nearly all school functions and after all basketball games and school dances.

== Athletics ==
Saint Joseph High School offers a variety of athletic programs. The SJHS Spartans field men's and women's teams in the WPIAL in: baseball/softball, basketball, bowling, volleyball, golf, tennis, swimming, and soccer. In addition, St Joseph students can participate in ice hockey through Burrell High School. By PIAA rule, if a St. Joe's student wishes to participate in a team sport not provided by the school, such as football, they may play with the high school for the school district in which they reside.

== Student body profile ==
As of June 2013, Saint Joseph has 204 students total through grades 9-12. Enrollment has declined to 159 students in 2021.

== See also ==
- List of high schools in Pennsylvania
