= Richard Phelan =

Richard Phelan may refer to:

- Richard Phelan (bishop)
- Richard Phelan (politician)
