= Aquinas Academy (Pittsburgh) =

Location
- 2308 West Hardies Road; Gibsonia, (Allegheny County), Pennsylvania 15044; United States
- 40°35′53″N 79°58′4″W

Information
- Type: Private, Coeducational
- Motto: Contemplata aliis tradere (To hand on to others the fruits of contemplation)
- Religious affiliation: Roman Catholicism
- Established: 1996
- President: Peter Blume
- Director: Nicholas Salinas (HS); Joseph Murray (MS); Michelle Repasky (LS); Sharon Navari (PS)
- Head of school: Tyler Deschamps
- Faculty: 40 full-time; 6 part-time
- Grades: K-12
- Campus size: 14 acres (57,000 m^{2})
- Colors: Blue and Gray
- Athletics conference: Pittsburgh Diocesan League/WPIAL
- Mascot: Crusader
- Team name: Crusaders
- Accreditation: Middle States Association of Colleges and Schools
- Asst. Head of School: Michael Burchill
- Admissions Director: Joseph Austin
- Athletic Director: Tom Kayda
- Asst. Athletic Director: Jim Richthammer
- Director of Sacred Liturgy: Richard Meland
- Website: AquinasAcademy-Pittsburgh.org

Aquinas Academy is a private, Roman Catholic K-12 school in Gibsonia, Pennsylvania. It is located in the Roman Catholic Diocese of Pittsburgh and consistently ranks in the top 5 schools in western Pennsylvania in its average SAT scores, in some years ranking first. The school also has consistently been named one of the Top Fifty Catholic Secondary Schools in the annual High School Honor Roll published by the Acton Institute . The high school was ranked the number one Catholic High School in Pennsylvania in 2015 and 2016 and the number one Catholic High School in the Pittsburgh area by Niche.com.

== Background ==
The Academy was founded in 1996 for the purpose of offering a rigorous classical curriculum covering all the major areas of the liberal arts in an intensive college preparatory program. It is the only independent K-12 Catholic school in the Pittsburgh area.
