= Richard Phelan (bishop) =

Irish-born prelate

His Excellency, The Right Reverend Richard Phelan
- Bishop of Pittsburgh; Titular Bishop of Cibyra
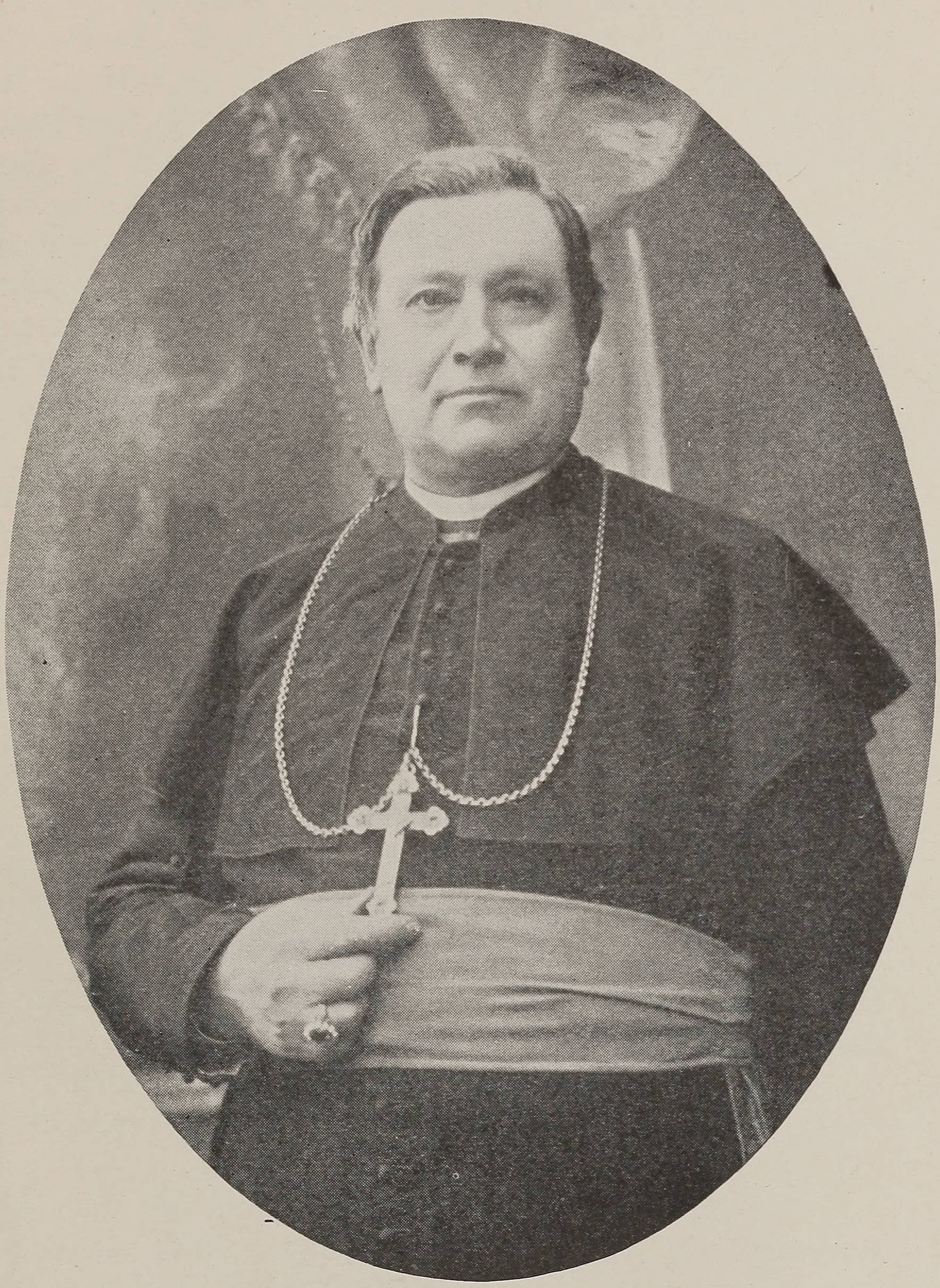
- Church: Catholic
- Diocese: Pittsburgh
- Appointed: 12 May 1885
- Predecessor: John Tuigg
- Successor: Regis Canevin
- Previous posts: Apostolic Administrator of Pittsburgh (1881 to 1885); Coadjutor Bishop of Pittsburgh (1885 to 1889)

Orders
- Ordination: May 4, 1854 by Michael O'Connor
- Consecration: August 2, 1885 by Patrick John Ryan

Personal details
- Born: January 1, 1828 Ballyragget, Ireland
- Died: December 20, 1904 (aged 76) Pittsburgh, Pennsylvania, US
- Education: Seminary of St. Michael; St. Mary's Theological Seminary
- Motto: Recolimus tuam passionem (We remember your passion)

Richard Phelan, D.D. (January 1, 1828 – December 20, 1904) was an Irish-born prelate of the Roman Catholic Church who served as the fourth bishop of the Diocese of Pittsburgh in Pennsylvania, in the United States from 1889 to 1904.

== Biography ==
=== Early years ===
Richard Phelan was born on January 1, 1828, in Sralee, County Kilkenny, in Ireland, then part of the United Kingdom. His parents were Michael and Mary Keoghan Phelan. Of their nine children, four entered religious life. Richard was educated by private tutors and at St Kieran's College in Kilkenny in County Kilkenny, Ireland.

In 1850, while at St. Kieran's, Phelan was recruited by Bishop Michael O'Connor of the Diocese of Pittsburgh, to finish his studies in the United States. After arriving in Pittsburgh, Phelan continued his studies at the Seminary of St. Michael. After two years there, he traveled to Baltimore, Maryland, to study at St. Mary's Theological Seminary.

=== Priesthood ===
Phelan was ordained a priest for the Diocese of Pittsburgh by Bishop Michael O'Connor in Pittsburgh on May 4, 1854. After his ordination, the diocese assigned Phelan to a mission in Indiana County, Pennsylvania. After cholera broke out in Pittsburgh, he was recalled there to assist. He served in Pittsburgh's Saint Paul Cathedral.

After three years, the diocese assigned Phelan to a parish in Freeport, Pennsylvania. In 1868, he was appointed pastor of St. Peter's Parish in Allegheny City, Pennsylvania. He built a new church there for over $150,000.

In 1876, the Vatican erected the new Diocese of Allegheny with the new St. Peter Church in Allegheny City designated as the pro-cathedral of the new diocese. Phelan was transferred into the new diocese.

In 1881, Bishop John Tuigg of Pittsburgh suffered a stroke and was forced to take a leave of absence. Phelan was appointed apostolic administrator of Pittsburgh and was subsequently made vicar-general.

=== Coadjutor Bishop and Bishop of Pittsburgh ===
After Tuigg suffered more strokes, Pope Leo XIII on May 12, 1885, appointed Phelan as coadjutor bishop of Pittsburgh and titular bishop of Cibyra. On August 2, 1885, he was consecrated at Saint Paul Cathedral іn Pittsburgh by Archbishop Patrick John Ryan. At that point, he handled the actual administration of the diocese, but continued to reside in Allegheny City. On July 1, 1889, the Vatican suppressed the Diocese of Allegheny and folded it into the Diocese of Pittsburgh.

Phelan became bishop of Pittsburgh when Tuigg died on December 7, 1889. The waves of immigrants into Western Pennsylvania soon led the Vatican to create a new diocese. In May, 1901, Leo XIII erected the Diocese of Altoona, taking several counties from Pittsburgh and the Diocese of Harrisburg.

=== Death and legacy ===
Richard Phelan died on December 20, 1904, at age 76, at St. Paul's Orphan Asylum in Pittsburgh. He was buried in St. Mary Cemetery in the city's Lawrenceville neighborhood.

== Sources ==
- Glenn, Francis A. (1993). Shepherds of the Faith 1843-1993: A Brief History of the Bishops of the Catholic Diocese of Pittsburgh. Pittsburgh: Catholic Diocese of Pittsburgh. ISBN none.

Catholic Church titles
Preceded by John Tuigg	Bishop of Pittsburgh; 1889–1904	Succeeded by Regis Canevin
