= Roman Catholic Diocese of Pittsburgh =

Catholic dioceses in Pennsylvania, U.S.

Diocese of Pittsburgh Diœcesis Pittsburgensis

Catholic
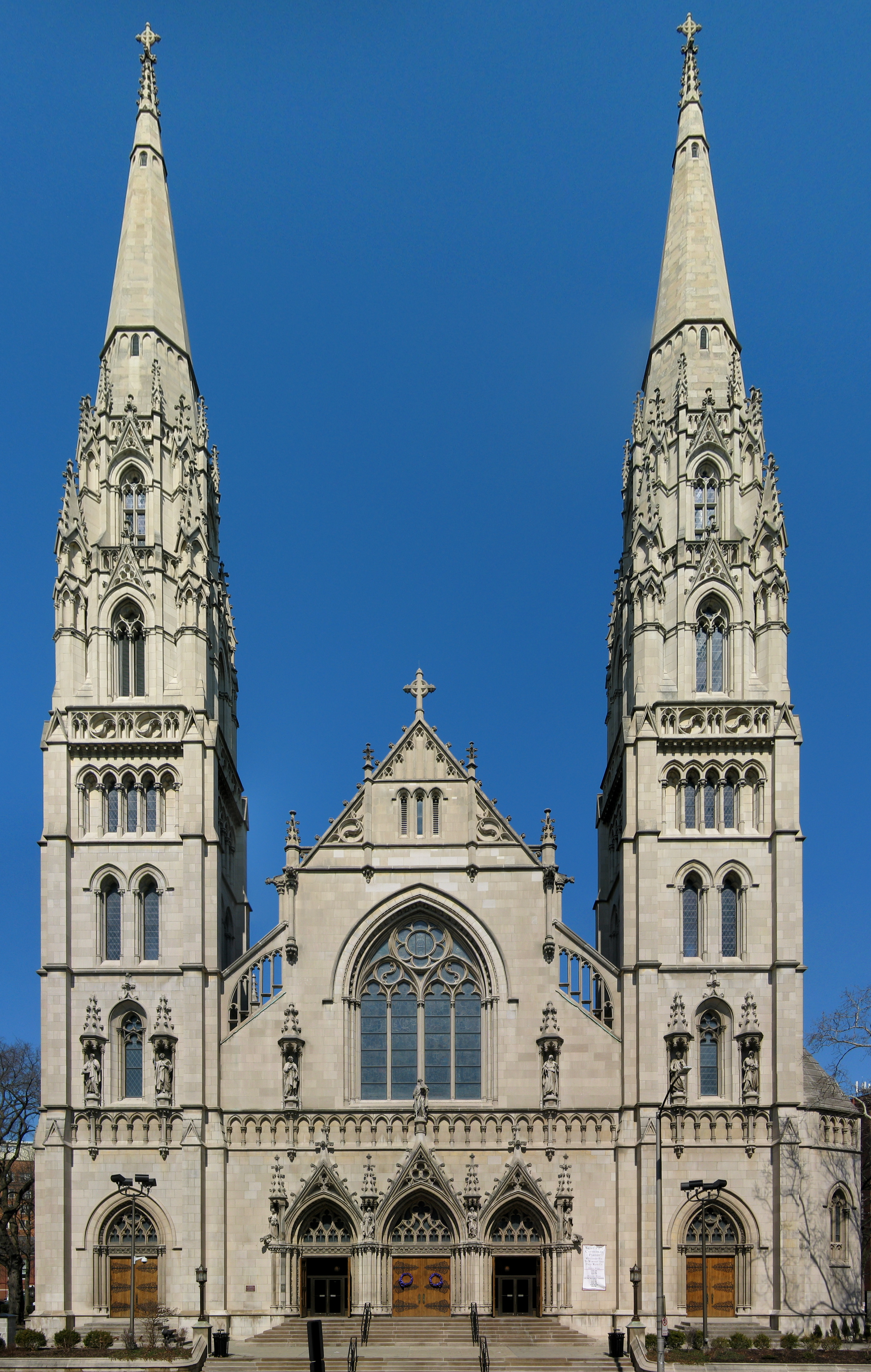
- St. Paul Cathedral

- Coat of Arms of the Diocese of Pittsburgh

Location
- Country: United States
- Territory: Pennsylvania counties of Allegheny, Beaver, Butler, Greene, Lawrence, and Washington
- Ecclesiastical province: Province of Philadelphia
- Headquarters: 2900 Noblestown Road; Pittsburgh, Pennsylvania 15205
- Coordinates: 40°26′50″N 79°56′59″W

Statistics
- Area: 3,755 sq mi (9,730 km^{2})
- Population: Total; Catholics: (as of 2023); 1,746,900; 618,731 (35.4%)
- Parishes: 107

Information
- Denomination: Catholic
- Sui iuris church: Latin Church
- Rite: Roman Rite
- Established: August 11, 1843; 183 years ago
- Cathedral: Saint Paul Cathedral
- Patron saint: Mary Immaculate (primary) and St. Paul the Apostle (secondary)
- Secular priests: 304 diocesan (2023); 85 religious; 117 permanent deacons

Current leadership
- Pope: Leo XIV
- Bishop: Mark Eckman
- Metropolitan Archbishop: Nelson J. Perez
- Auxiliary Bishops: William J. Waltersheid
- Vicar General: Lawrence A. DiNardo
- Judicial Vicar: Michael S. Sedor
- Bishops emeritus: David Zubik; William J. Winter

Map
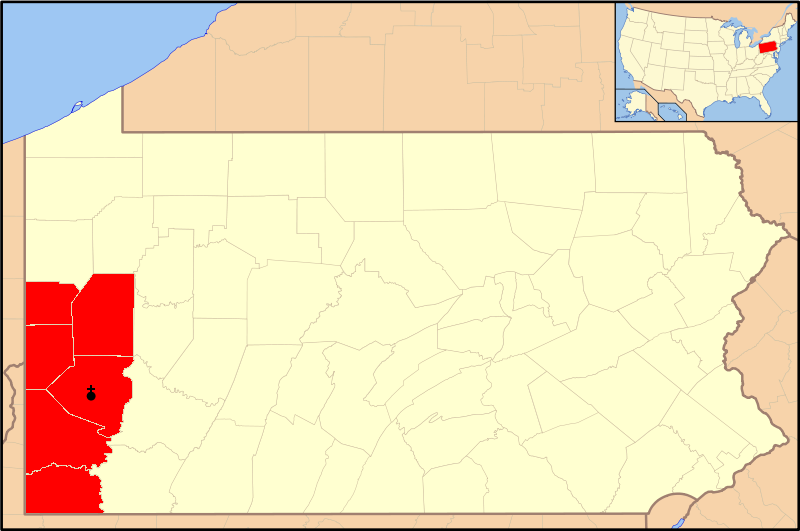

Website
- www.diopitt.org

The Diocese of Pittsburgh (Latin: Diœcesis Pittsburgensis) is a diocese of the Catholic Church in Western Pennsylvania in the United States. Established in 1843, the diocese is a suffragan diocese of the Archdiocese of Philadelphia. The cathedral church is Saint Paul Cathedral in Pittsburgh. The bishop is Mark Eckman.

== Territory ==
The Diocese of Pittsburgh includes 61 parish-groupings (107 churches) in the counties of Allegheny, Beaver, Butler, Greene, Lawrence, and Washington, an area of 3,755 sq mi (9,730 km^{2}). It had a Catholic population of 618,731 in 2023. As of 2023, the diocese had 304 diocesan priests, 85 religious priests, and 117 permanent deacons.

== History ==
=== 1750 to 1800 ===
In 1754, the first mass within the present-day Diocese of Pittsburgh was celebrated at Fort Duquesne in present-day Pittsburgh by a French Franciscan chaplain. A chapel was built at the fort, dedicated to the Virgin Mary under the title of "The Assumption of Our Lady of the Beautiful River." When the French destroyed the fort in 1758, the mission became a ruin. The region passed into British rule with the signing of the Treaty of Paris in 1763. The region became part of the Province of Pennsylvania.

Unlike the other British colonies in North America, the Province of Pennsylvania did not ban Catholics from the colony or threaten priests with imprisonment. However, the colony required any Catholics seeing public office to take an oath to Protestantism. In 1784, a year after the end of the American Revolution, Pope Pius VI erected the Apostolic Prefecture of United States of America, including all of the new United States.

In 1789, Pius VI converted the prefecture to the Diocese of Baltimore, covering all of the United States. With the passage of the US Bill of Rights in 1791, Catholics received full freedom of worship.

=== 1800 to 1850 ===
In 1808, Pope Pius VII erected the Diocese of Philadelphia, covering all of Pennsylvania. In 1843, the four American bishops and one archbishop met in the Fifth Provincial Council of Baltimore. They recommended that the Vatican erect a Diocese of Pittsburgh and nominated Michael O'Connor, vicar general of Western Pennsylvania and pastor of St. Paul's Church in Pittsburgh, to be appointed the first bishop.

The Vatican erected the Diocese of Pittsburgh on August 11, 1843, by taking its territory from the Diocese of Philadelphia. The new diocese covered all of Western Pennsylvania. The pope appointed O'Connor as bishop. After his consecration in Rome, O'Connor traveled to Ireland to recruit clergy for his new diocese. He found eight seminarians from Maynooth College, a seminary in Maynooth, and seven Sisters of Mercy from Dublin. O'Connor arrived in Pittsburgh in December 1843.

In 1844, O'Connor founded a girls' academy and St. Paul's orphan asylum, a chapel for African Americans, the Pittsburgh Catholic and St. Michael's Seminary. To serve the German immigrants in his diocese, he welcomed the Benedictine monks, who founded Saint Vincent Archabbey in Latrobe, the first Benedictine monastery in the United States.

To further education of Irish-Catholic immigrants in the diocese, he invited the Franciscan Brothers of Mountbellew in Ireland to come to the United States. They established the first community of religious brothers in the United States in Loretto.

=== 1850 to 1900 ===
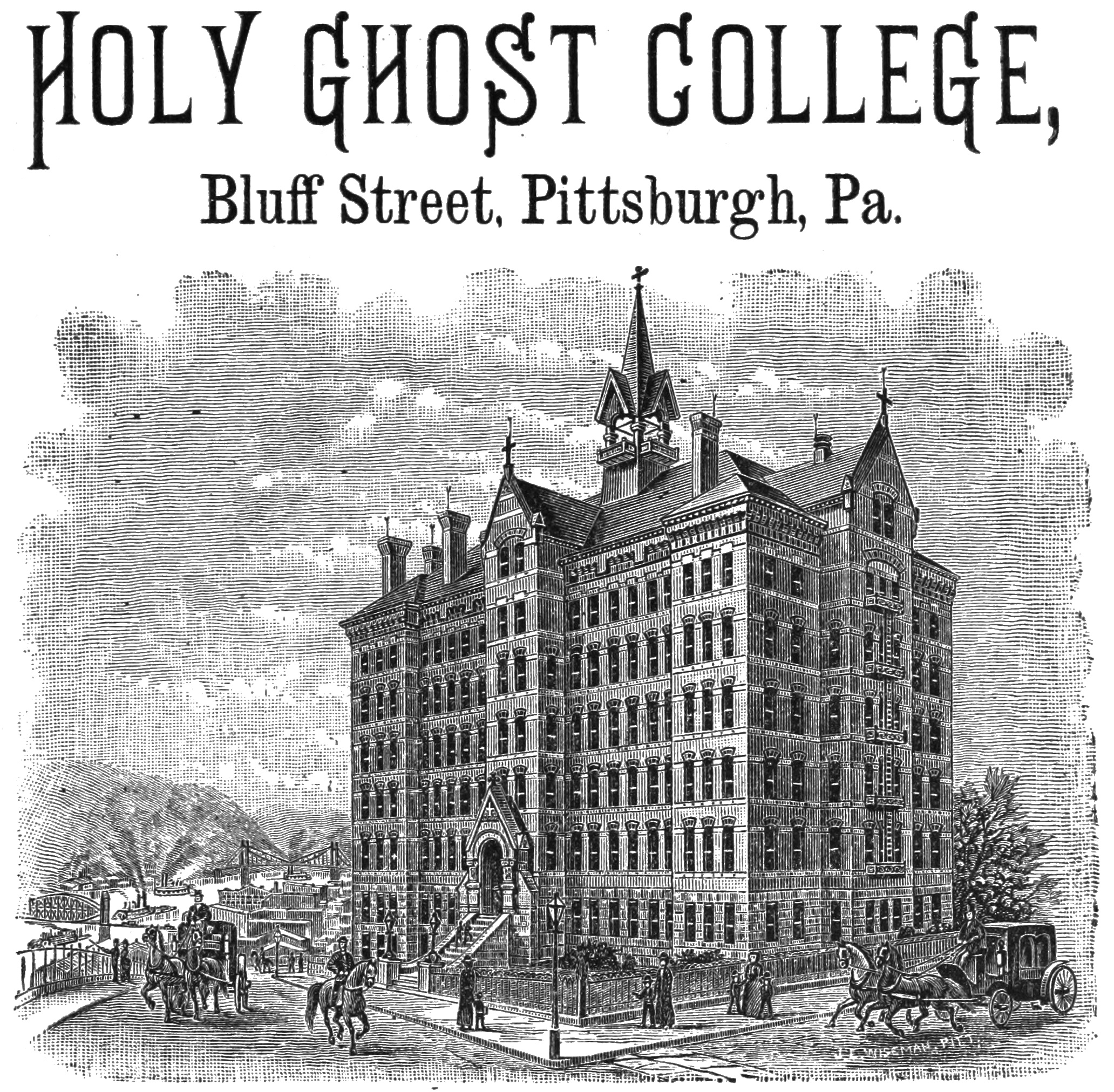
Holy Ghost College, Pittsburgh, Pennsylvania (1888), now Duquesne University

In 1853, the Vatican erected the Diocese of Erie, taking the northern counties from the Diocese of Pittsburgh. After O'Connor resigned in 1860, Michael Domenec from Philadelphia was consecreated as the second bishop of Pittsburgh. After the American Civil War ended in 1865, the diocese went heavily in debt to finance expansion projects. The Panic of 1873 resulted in a debt crisis for the diocese.

In 1876, Pius IX erected the Diocese of Allegheny, taking several counties from the Diocese of Pittsburgh, and named Domenec as its first bishop. He was succeeded by John Tuigg of Pittsburgh.

During his tenure as bishop, Tuigg succeeded in stabilizing the diocesan finances. The Pittsburgh Catholic College of the Holy Ghost, the predecessor of Duquesne University, was founded in 1878 in Pittsburgh by a group of Holy Ghost priests from Germany. After Tuigg suffered his first stroke, Pope Leo XIII appointed Richard Phelan of Pittsburgh as coadjutor bishop in 1885.

In July 1889, the Vatican reversed course, suppressed the Diocese of Allegheny and reintegrated all of its territory back into the Diocese of Pittsburgh. After Tuigg died in December 1889, Phelan succeeded him as bishop. During this period, Catholic immigrants of many nationalities flooded into Western Pennsylvania to work the mines and steel mills. Phelan set up new national parishes with pastors who could speak the immigrants' native languages.

=== 1900 to 1980 ===
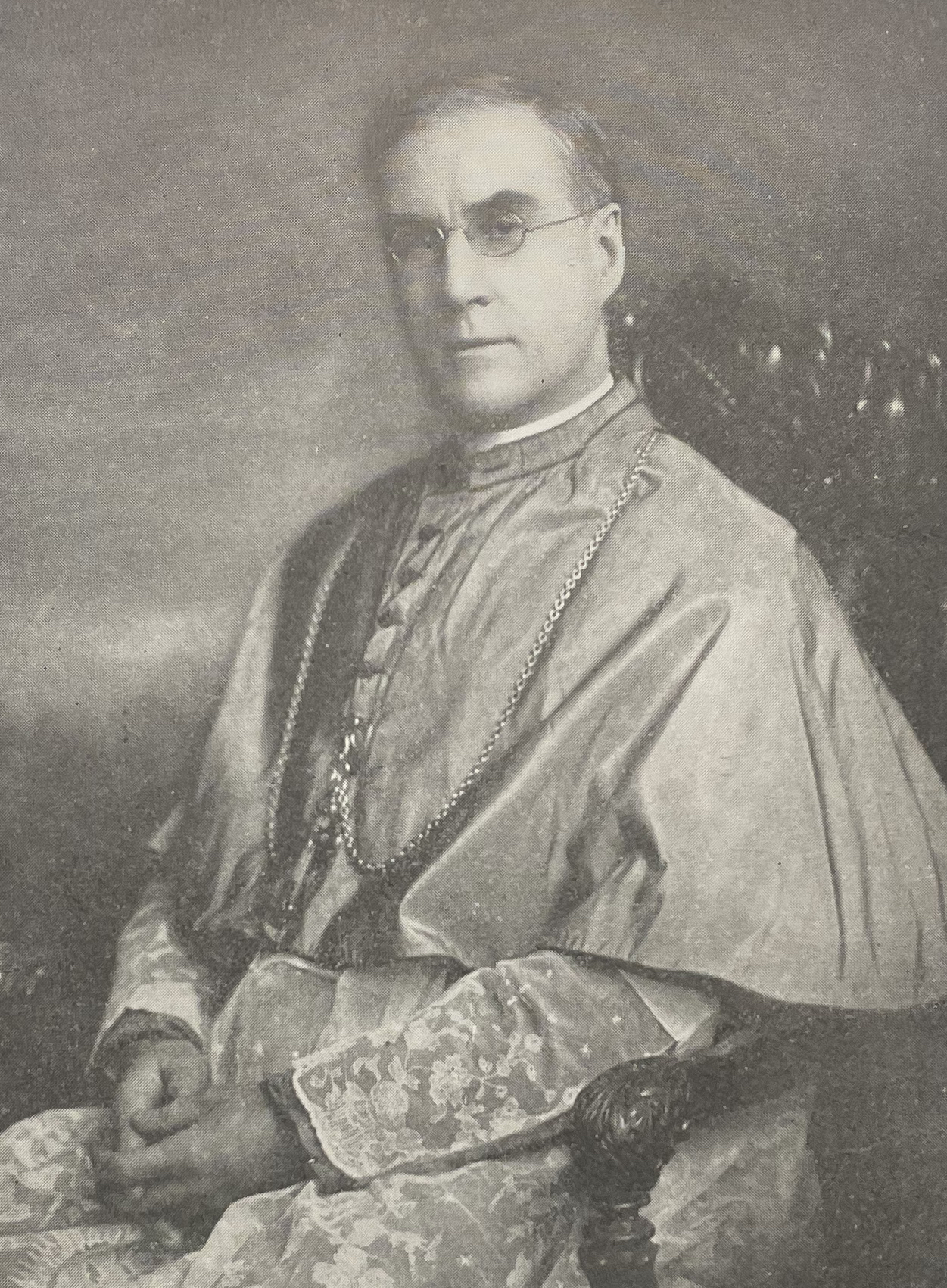
Bishop Canevin (1917)

In 1901, the Vatican erected the Diocese of Altoona, taking its territory from the Diocese of Pittsburgh. In 1903, Pope Pius X named Regis Canevin of Pittsburgh as coadjutor bishop in that diocese. Canevin succeeded Phelan after his death in 1904. Canevin died in 1921.

Hugh Charles Boyle of Pittsburgh was the sixth bishop of that diocese in 1921. During his 29-year tenure, Boyle sponsored a comprehensive school-building program in the diocese. The Brothers of the Christian Schools opened Central Catholic High School in Pittsburgh in 1927. The Sisters of Mercy opened Carlow College, a women's college, in Pittsburgh in 1929. It is now Carlow University

In 1948, Monsignor John Dearden of Pittsburgh was appointed coadjutor bishop of the diocese by Pope Pius XII to assist Boyle. When Boyle died in 1950, Dearden automatically succeeded him as bishop. The Vatican in 1951 erected the Diocese of Greensburg, taking its territory from the Diocese of Pittsburgh. Dearden was appointed archbishop of the Archdiocese of Detroit in 1958

To replace Dearden, Pius XII named Bishop John Wright from the Diocese of Worcester. Wright attended the Second Vatican Council in Rome (1962–1965). Following the council's advancements in ecumenism, he believed that an "immediate unity in good works and charity" would arise between Catholics and Protestants. In 1961, Wright opened the Bishop's Latin School in Pittsburgh as the pre-seminary high school of the diocese. La Roche College was founded in McCandless, Pennsylvania, in 1963 by the Sisters of Divine Providence as a private college for religious sisters. Today it is La Roche University.

Wright promoted music and culture during his time in Pittsburgh. He commissioned the composer Mary Lou Williams, to perform a jazz mass at a local Catholic school, and helped her to establish the Pittsburgh Jazz Festival. In 1969, Pope Paul VI appointed Wright as the prefect of the Congregation for the Clergy in Rome.

The next bishop of Pittsburgh was Auxiliary Bishop Vincent Leonard of Pittsburgh, appointed by Paul VI in 1969. During his tenure, Leonard became one of the first American bishops to release diocesan financial reports to the public. He also established a due-process system to allow Catholics to appeal any administrative decision they believed was a violation of canon law.

=== 1980 to 2000 ===
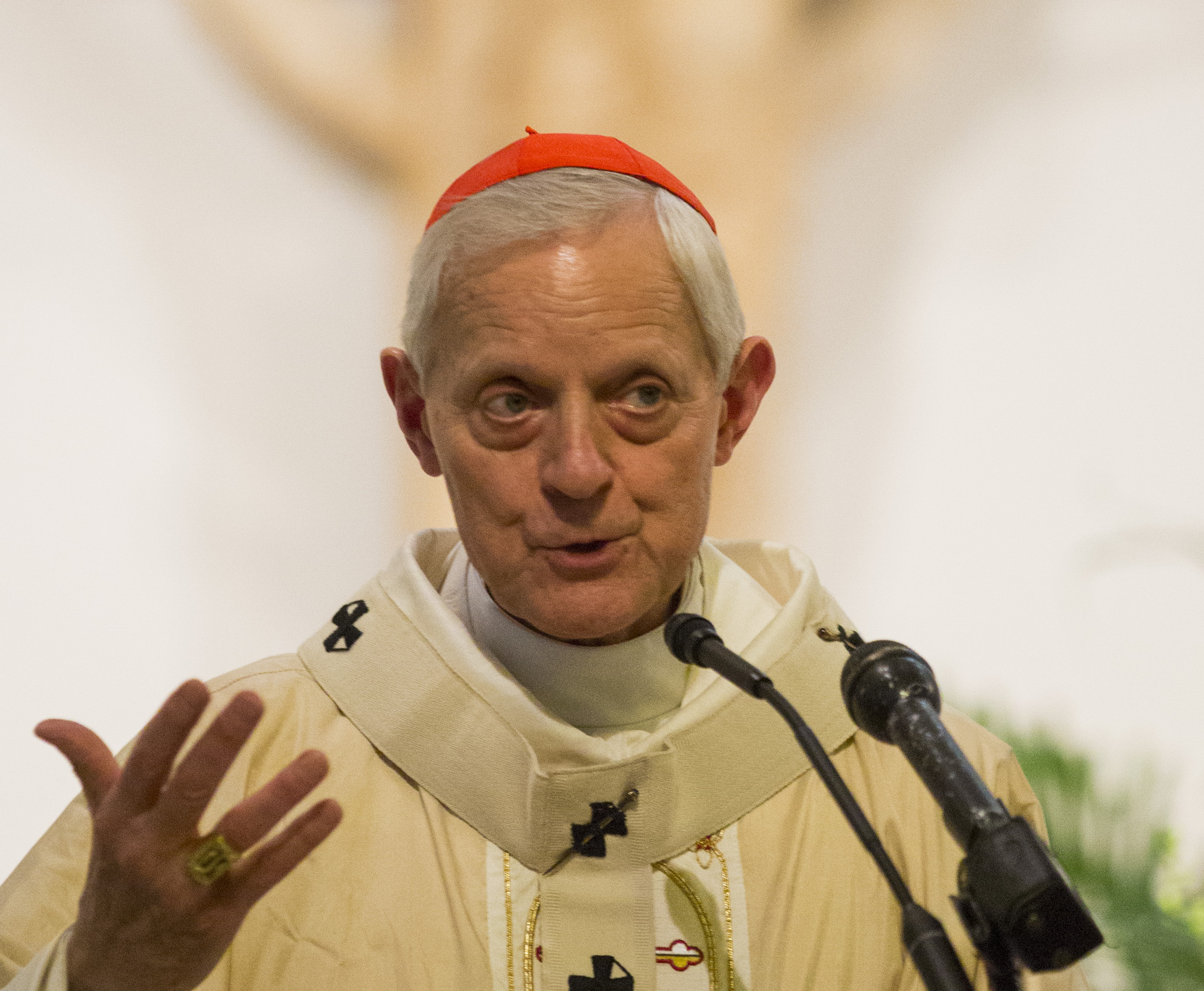
Cardinal Wuerl (2015)

Leonard resigned as bishop of Pittsburgh in 1983, due to severe arthritis. Pope John Paul II then named Auxiliary Bishop Anthony Bevilacqua of the Diocese of Brooklyn as the tenth bishop of Pittsburgh that same year.

In 1986, Bevilacqua banned women from participating in the Holy Thursday foot-washing service. He said that the service was a re-enactment of the Last Supper, in which Jesus only washed men's feet. After pushback from Catholic women and from the National Conference of Catholic Bishops, Bevilacqua relented, allowing individual pastors to decide. However, he refused to attend services that allowed the washing of women's feet. In 1987, John Paul II appointed Bevilacqua as archbishop of Philadelphia.

The next bishop of Pittsburgh was Auxiliary Bishop Donald Wuerl from the Archdiocese of Seattle, appointed by John Paul II in 1988. Despite the weak financial condition of the diocese, Wuerl decided to expand health services. Wuerl worked with hospitals and community groups to create a group home for people suffering from HIV/AIDS. In 2003, Wuerl conducted a successful $2.5 million fundraising campaign to create the Catholic Charities Free Health Care Center in Pittsburgh. The clinic served the uninsured working poor.

Wuerl reorganized the diocese in response to demographic changes, the decline of the local steel industry, and the diocese's weak financial position. He closed 73 church buildings, including 37 churches, and reduced 331 parishes to 214 parishes through mergers. Wuerl was named archbishop of the Archdiocese of Washington in 2006.

=== 2000 to present ===
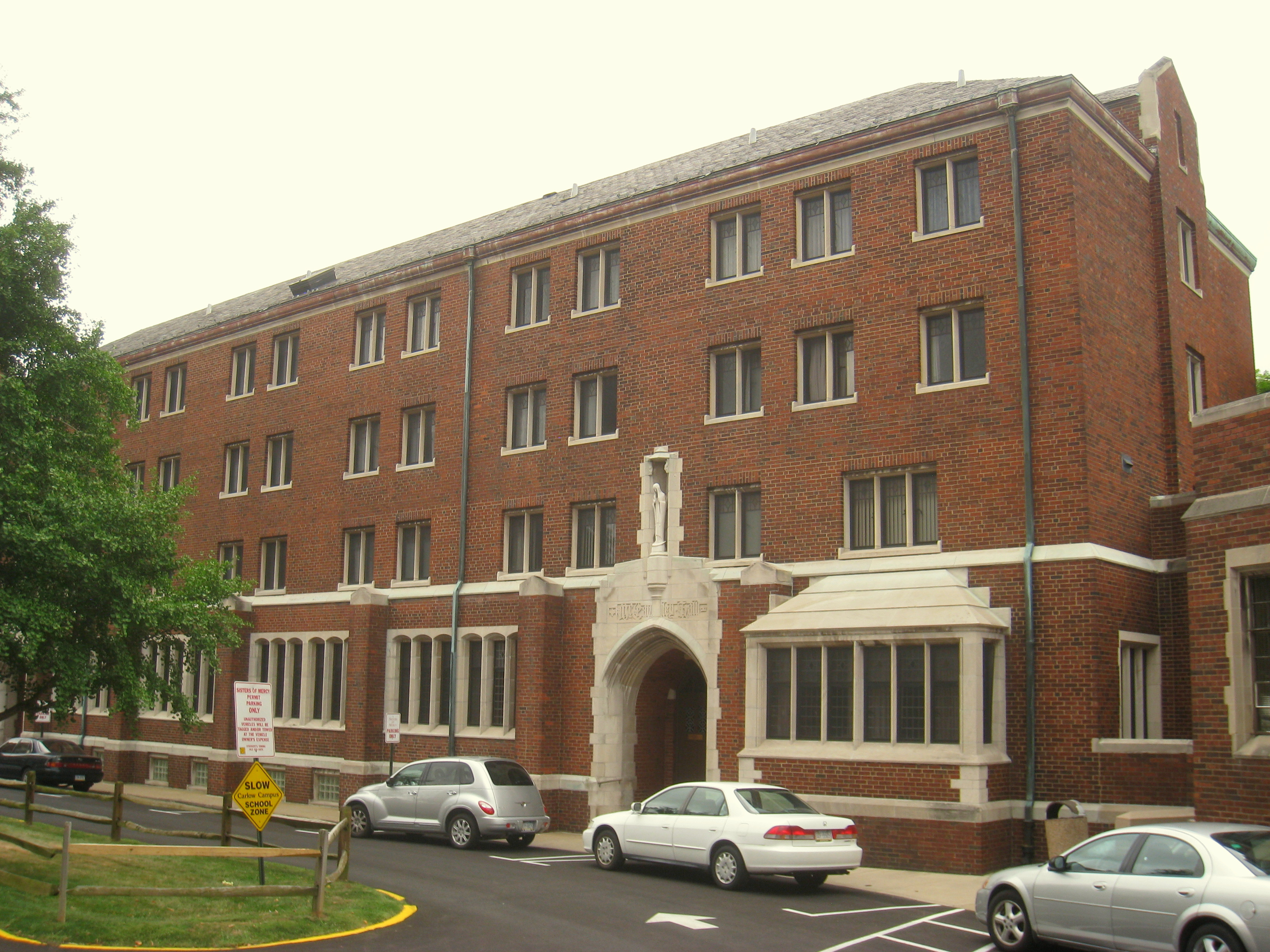
Carlow University, Pittsburgh, Pennsylvania (2010)

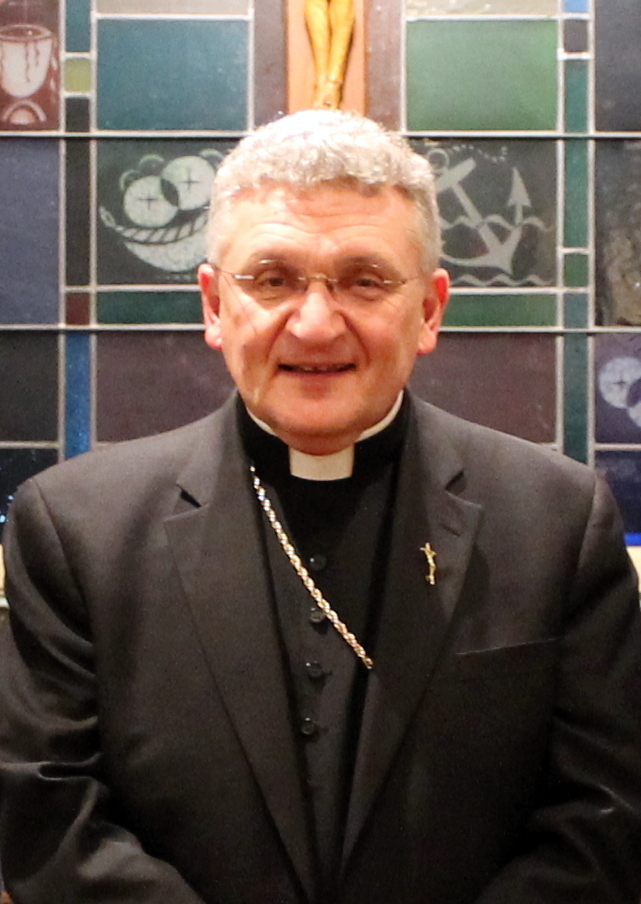
Bishop Zubik (2013)

Pope Benedict XVI appointed bishop David Zubik from the Diocese of Green Bay as the twelfth bishop of Pittsburgh in 2007. Between 2005 and 2010, the diocese closed 16 elementary schools.

In 2012, the diocese joined other parties in suing the Obama administration regarding the 2010 Affordable Care Act (ACA). The diocese objected to a regulation that would force Catholic hospitals and other such institutions to provide health insurance coverage of contraceptives to their employees. These cases were consolidated and made it to the Supreme Court as Zubik v. Burwell. The court vacated a lower court ruling and forced the cases back to the lower courts.

In 2015, Zubik announced On Mission for the Church ALIVE!, an initiative to start reorganizing parishes in 2018. The plan was to merge 188 parishes to 57 parish groupings served by clergy teams.

Zubik formulated the ALIVE! plan in response to decreasing mass attendance, a significant drop in offertory collections and a declining number of priests; by 2025 the diocese was projected to have a 50% drop in the number of priests from 2018.

In 2018, the diocese closed Saint Rosalia Academy in Greenfield. It also merged North American Martyrs School and Saint Bernadette School in Monroeville into the new Divine Mercy Academy. In 2020, the Pittsburgh-East Regional Catholic Elementary Schools (PERCES) closed East Catholic School in Forest Hills and Saint Maria Goretti in Bloomfield. PERCES also merged Saint Anne School in Castle Shannon, Saint Bernard School in Mount Lebanon, Our Lady of Grace School in Scott Township, and Saint Thomas More School in Bethel Park into one school program.

== Coat of arms ==
Coat of arms of Roman Catholic Diocese of Pittsburgh
Escutcheon Sable, a fess chequy argent and azure, in chief two crosses-pattées-arrondies or, over all in pale a sword, hilt in base, of the last Symbolism The arms of the diocese are based on those of the Pitt family, replacing the coins present in the family arms with crosses and adding a sword in honor of the diocesan St. Paul Cathedral.

== Bishops ==
=== Bishops of Pittsburgh ===
1. Michael O'Connor (1843-7/1853), appointed Bishop of Erie
2. Michael O'Connor (12/1853-1860)
3. Michael Domenec (1860–1876), appointed Bishop of Allegheny
4. John Tuigg (1876–1889)
5. Richard Phelan (1889–1904; coadjutor bishop 1885–1889)
6. Regis Canevin (1904–1921; coadjutor bishop 1903–1904), retired and appointed Archbishop ad personam
7. Hugh Boyle (1921–1950)
8. John Dearden (1950–1958; coadjutor bishop 1948–1950), appointed Archbishop of Detroit (elevated to Cardinal in 1969)
9. John Wright (1959–1969), appointed Prefect of the Congregation for the Clergy (elevated to Cardinal in 1969)
10. Vincent Leonard (1969–1983)
11. Anthony Bevilacqua (1983–1987), appointed Archbishop of Philadelphia (elevated to Cardinal in 1991)
12. Donald Wuerl (1988–2006), appointed Archbishop of Washington (elevated to Cardinal in 2010)
13. David Zubik (2007–2025)
14. Mark Eckman (2025-present)

=== Current auxiliary bishops ===
- William J. Waltersheid (2011–present)

=== Former auxiliary bishops ===
- Coleman F. Carroll (1953–1958), appointed Bishop of Miami and subsequently elevated to archbishop of the same see
- Vincent Martin Leonard (1964–1969), appointed Bishop of Pittsburgh
- John Bernard McDowell (1966–1996)
- Anthony G. Bosco (1970–1987), appointed Bishop of Greensburg
- William J. Winter (1989–2005)
- Thomas J. Tobin (1992–1996), appointed Bishop of Youngstown and later Bishop of Providence
- David Zubik (1997–2003), appointed Bishop of Green Bay and later Bishop of Pittsburgh
- Paul J. Bradley (2004–2009), appointed Bishop of Kalamazoo
- Mark Eckman (2022–2025), appointed bishop of Pittsburgh

=== Other diocesan priests who became bishops ===
- Tobias Mullen, appointed Bishop of Erie in 1868
- James O'Connor, appointed Vicar Apostolic of Nebraska in 1876 and later Bishop of Omaha
- Ralph Leo Hayes, appointed Bishop of Helena in 1933 and later Rector of the Pontifical North American College and Bishop of Davenport
- Jerome Daniel Hannan, appointed Bishop of Scranton in 1954
- Howard Joseph Carroll, appointed Bishop of Altoona in 1957
- William G. Connare, appointed Bishop of Greensburg in 1960
- Cyril John Vogel (priest here, 1931–1951), appointed Bishop of Salina in 1965
- Norbert Felix Gaughan (priest here, 1945–1951), appointed Auxiliary Bishop of Greensburg in 1975 and later Bishop of Gary
- Nicholas C. Dattilo, appointed Bishop of Harrisburg in 1989
- Adam J. Maida, appointed Bishop of Green Bay in 1983 and later Archbishop of Detroit (elevated to Cardinal in 1994)
- Daniel DiNardo, appointed Coadjutor Bishop (in 1997) and Bishop of Sioux City and later Coadjutor Bishop, Coadjutor Archbishop, and Archbishop of Galveston–Houston (elevated to Cardinal in 2007)
- Edward J. Burns, appointed Bishop of Juneau in 2009 and later Bishop of Dallas
- Bernard A. Hebda, appointed Bishop of Gaylord in 2009 and later Coadjutor Archbishop of Newark and Archbishop of Saint Paul and Minneapolis
- David Bonnar, appointed Bishop of Youngstown in 2021

== Education ==
=== High schools ===
==== Diocesan ====
As of 2025, the Diocese of Pittsburgh operates seven high schools:

- Bishop Canevin High School – Pittsburgh
- Central Catholic High School – Pittsburgh (All boys)
- North Catholic High School – Cranberry Township
- Oakland Catholic High School – Pittsburgh (All girls)
- Serra Catholic High School – McKeesport
- Seton-La Salle Catholic High School – Mt. Lebanon
- St. Joseph High School – Harrison Township

==== Independent ====
The following three schools operate independently of the diocese, but have its approval:

- Aquinas Academy of Pittsburgh – Hampton Township, is an independent K-12 Catholic school
- Nazareth Prep – Emsworth, is an independent Catholic high school
- Our Lady of the Sacred Heart High School – Moon Township, is an independent Catholic high school operated by the Felician Sisters.

==== Elementary schools ====
As of 2025, the elementary schools in the Diocese of Pittsburgh are operated by four regional Catholic elementary school systems:

- North Hills Regional (NHRCES)
- Pittsburgh East Regional (PERCES)
- South Regional (SRCES)
- Extra Mile

=== Universities ===
Three Catholic universities operate within the diocese. While affiliated with the Catholic Church, these institutions only receive indirect support from the diocese, such as tuition support for students from diocesan schools.

- Duquesne University – Pittsburgh
- Carlow University – Pittsburgh
- La Roche University – McCandless

=== Seminary ===
Seminarians in the diocese complete their pre-theological studies at Saint Paul Seminary in Pittsburgh.

== Ministries ==
The Diocese of Pittsburgh sponsors a yearly Medallion Ball. It is a debutante ball that honors young women who perform at least 100 hours of eligible volunteer work, although most perform more than 800 hours of volunteer work. The proceeds from the event benefit St. Lucy's Auxiliary to the Blind.

- In 2002, the medallion was awarded to a young woman with Down syndrome who had volunteered as a teacher's assistant.
- In 2013, a medallion winner was a legally blind who volunteered with a therapeutic horseback-riding program.

The diocese holds a biannual "The Light is On For You" campaign to help Catholics reconnect to the church. The campaign makes it more convenient for Catholics to make confession. During the campaign, confession is available at all diocesan churches for extended hours.

== Sexual abuse cases ==
=== 1978 to 1990 ===
In July 1978, a woman called the Pittsburgh Police to complain that Anthony Cipolla had sexually abused her two sons, ages nine and 12. The abuse allegedly took place in Dearborn, Michigan and at Cipolla's rectory, with Cipolla giving the boys fake physical examinations. During the preliminary hearing, Bishop Leonard called the mother, urging her to drop the charges. Leonard said that the diocese would take case of Cipolla. The mother followed his advice; the diocese transferred Cipolla to another diocese.

In 1988, Tim Bendig told the diocese that Cipolla had sexually abused him from around 1981 to 1986. Like the earlier two victims, Cipolla administered physical exams to Bendig and rubbed baby powder on his body. The diocese removed Cipolla from ministry and sent him to St. Michael's Institute, a treatment facility in New York City. When Cipolla finished, St. Michael's gave him a positive recommendation to return to ministry. However, Bishop Wuerl refused to return him to ministry until he was evaluated at a different center; Cipolla refused the order. Wuerl suspended Cipolla priestly faculties in 1990. In 1992, Bendig sued the diocese. Cipolla appealed his suspension to the Supreme Tribunal of the Apostolic Signatura, which in March 1993 ordered Wuerl to return him to ministry. The diocese in 1993 made a financial settlement with Bendig. The Vatican in 1995 reversed its 1993 ruling and permanently suspended Cipolla from public ministry. In 2002, Cipolla was laicized.

In 1985, John O'Connor, a priest of the Diocese of Camden, was charged with inappropriately touching a 14-year-old boy in Cape May, New Jersey. O'Connor was arrested, then released to a pretrial intervention program in Toronto, followed by a period of court supervision. After O'Connor completed the program, Camden Bishop George Henry Guilfoyle asked Bishop Bevilacqua to accept O'Connor in the Diocese of Pittsburgh. Bevilacqua agreed and assigned O'Connor as a hospital chaplain. O'Connor was moved back to Camden in 1993 because his 1985 victim had sued that diocese and received a financial settlement.

In September 1987, the diocese received an accusation of sexual abuse against three priests: Richard Zula, Francis Pucci, and Robert Wolk. The three men were accused of sexually abusing two young brothers between 1984 and 1986. The brothers filed suit against the diocese in May 1988. Zula pleaded guilty and was sentenced in 1990 to two to five years in prison. Wolk was arrested in October 1988 and charged with oral sodomy and attempted anal sex. He pleaded guilty in January 1990 and was sentenced to five to ten years in prison. He was convicted of similar offenses in another Pennsylvania county in June 1988.

Wuerl met with the family of the brothers in early 1989. In March 1989, the diocese settled the brothers' lawsuit for $900,000. Wuerl then implemented a "zero tolerance" policy against sexual abuse. Wuerl announced to his clergy that sexual contact with a minor was not merely a sin, but a crime that would result in permanent removal from the ministry and maybe prison. Priests were instructed to report any allegation of sexual abuse committed by a priest or church employee to the chancery. The diocese created the Diocesan Review Board in 1989 to offer evaluations and recommendations to the bishop on the handling of all sexual abuse cases.

=== 1990 to present ===
The Diocese of Pittsburgh removed David Dzermejko from Mary, Mother of the Church Parish in Charleroi in 2009 after the diocese received accusations from two men of sexual abuse in the late 1970s and early 1980s. In May 2013, he was indicted on charges of possessing child pornography. Police had found pornographic images on his computer. Dzermejko pleaded guilty in April 2014 and was sentenced to three years in prison.

In December 2011, a woman entering the office of Bartley A. Sorensen observed the priest looking at child pornography on his computer. She immediately reported him to the diocese, which suspended him and notified authorities. Police found over 5,000 pornographic images on his computer, along with printed materials. He pleaded guilty in May 2021 and was sentenced to 93 months in prison.

Deacon Rosendo Dacal was arrested in April 2018 on charges of unlawful contact with a minor and criminal use of communications. Dacal in December 2017 started communicating in a chat room with who seemed like a teenage boy, sending the boy sexually explicit messages and pornographic images. However, the boy was actually a North Strabane, Pennsylvania, police officer. Dacal pleaded guilty and was sentenced to two years of probation and 100 hours of community service.

=== Pennsylvania grand jury investigation ===
In early 2016, a grand jury investigation, led by Pennsylvania Attorney General Josh Shapiro, began an inquiry into sexual abuse by Catholic clergy in six Pennsylvania dioceses, including the Diocese of Pittsburgh. The six dioceses in August 2018 sued the attorney general in the Pennsylvania Supreme Court, opposing the release of the grand jury report. They raised issues about the rights of priests named in the report, including the lack of due process and fairness, the deprivation of the right to personal reputation and the inability of clergy to defend themselves. The court allowed the state to publish the grand jury report.

In 2018, Zubik confirmed that the diocese would release the list of clergy accused of sexual abuse when the grand jury report was made public. In his letter, Zubik noted that the diocese had implemented policies to deal with sexual abuse 30 years ago. Clergy, church employees, and volunteers were all required to go through sexual abuse training programs and criminal background checks. Zubik also noted that 90% of all the allegations in the report occurred before 1990.

The Pennsylvania grand jury report was released in August 2018. It listed 99 priests who had served in the Diocese of Pittsburgh. The report stated that some priests in the diocese ran a child pornography ring in the 1970s and 1980s, saying they "used whips, violence and sadism in raping their victims." These abusive priests gave their victims gold crosses so that other pedophile priests would recognize them.

=== Sexual abuse lawsuits ===
In January 2020, a lawsuit against the Diocese of Pittsburgh which was filed by sex abuse survivors, as well as their parents, in September 2018 was allowed to move forward. In February 2020, it was reported that the lawsuit did not involve requests for monetary awards, but rather greater disclosure of sex abuse records. In April 2020, a man filed a lawsuit against the diocese for allegedly shielding priests who sexually abused him as a boy.

In August 2020, a new lawsuit was filed against the diocese from a man alleging that Leo Burchianti attacked and raped him twice when he was an altar boy. Burchianti, a priest who died in 2013, was also accused of having inappropriate sexual relationships with at least eight boys and was previously mentioned in the state grand report. Wuerl and Zubik were named as defendants in numerous lawsuits as well.

Also in August 2020, 25 new sex abuse lawsuits were filed against the Diocese of Pittsburgh. In November 2020, the Pennsylvania Supreme Court denied a petition filed by the diocese to grant a stay which would have delayed three ongoing lawsuits.
