= Pittsburgh Catholic =

- Type: Website
- Owner(s): Diocese of Pittsburgh
- General manager: Jennifer Antkowiak
- Founded: 1844
- Language: English
- Ceased publication: 2020
- Headquarters: Pittsburgh, Pennsylvania
- ISSN: 0032-0323
- Website: pittsburghcatholic.org

The Pittsburgh Catholic is the Catholic news source for the Roman Catholic Diocese of Pittsburgh, published for lay people, clergy and religious. It labeled itself as the oldest Catholic newspaper in continuous publication in the U.S. The newspaper was established in 1844 by Pittsburgh's first bishop, Michael O'Connor. According to its website, the Catholic had a total market of 111,250 Catholics. Publication was suspended in March 2020 due to the effects of the COVID-19 pandemic but returned as an online news source on September 25, 2020. It is currently not available online, but is published six times per year in a magazine format.

The print version of the Catholic was available for free at most churches and Catholic outlets or centers in the Diocese of Pittsburgh, as churches purchased the newspaper in bulk for 21 cents per copy. Articles included news about events occurring throughout the diocese, articles on local diocesan schools, features on community and charity programs orchestrated by local Catholic organizations, reviews and commentary on contemporary media, question-and-answer forums by priests to explain church doctrine, and editorials on Church issues. The former Bishop of Pittsburgh, Donald Wuerl, was generally seen as a conservative bishop. As a result, the Pittsburgh Catholic was considered a conservative publication as well. However, because the newspaper is oriented towards the local region, it rarely contained extensive commentary on national issues. According to the Pittsburgh Business Times Book of Lists, the Pittsburgh Catholic was the largest weekly publication in western Pennsylvania and the second-largest newspaper in western Pennsylvania.

The Pittsburgh Catholic is a member of the Catholic Press Association. Its general manager, Robert P. Lockwood, was nominated as finalist for the association's annual St. Francis de Sales Award.
