= John Tuigg =

Irish-born prelate

His Excellency, The Right Reverend John Tuigg
- Bishop of Pittsburgh; Administrator of Allegheny
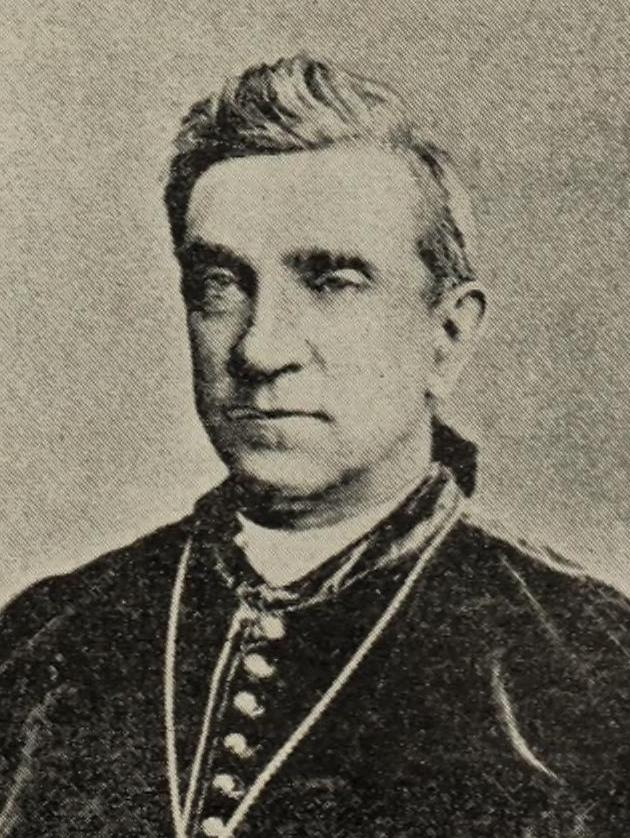
- Church: Roman Catholic Church
- See: Diocese of Pittsburgh
- In office: January 11, 1876 – December 7, 1889
- Predecessor: Michael Domenec
- Successor: Richard Phelan

Orders
- Ordination: May 14, 1850 by Michael O’Connor
- Consecration: March 19, 1876 by James Frederick Bryan Wood

Personal details
- Born: February 19, 1820 Donoughmore, Ireland
- Died: December 7, 1889 (aged 69) Altoona, Pennsylvania, US
- Education: All Hallows College; St. Michael's Seminary
- Motto: Sit nomen Domini benedictum (Blessed be the name of the Lord)

Styles of John Tuigg
- Reference style: His Excellency; The Right Reverend
- Spoken style: Your Excellency
- Religious style: Bishop

John Tuigg (February 19, 1820 – December 7, 1889) was an Irish-born prelate of the Roman Catholic Church. He served as the third bishop of the Diocese of Pittsburgh in Pennsylvania from 1876 to 1889.

== Biography ==
=== Early life ===
John Tuigg was born on February 19, 1820, in Donoughmore, County Cork, in Ireland. Deciding to become a priest, he began studying at All Hallows College in Dublin.

In 1849, when Bishop Michael O'Connor traveled to Dublin to recruit seminarians for missionary work in America, Tuigg was the first to respond. He arrived in Pittsburgh, Pennsylvania, in December 1849. He finished his studies for the priesthood at St. Michael's Seminary in Pittsburgh, where he taught until his ordination.

=== Priesthood ===
Tuigg was ordained a priest for the Diocese of Pittsburgh by Bishop Michael O’Connor in Pittsburgh on May 14, 1850. After his ordination, O'Connor assigned Tuigg as his secretary and as assistant pastor of St. Brigid Parish in Pittsburgh. He started building a new church for St. Brigid, but was soon transferred to perform mission work in Altoona, Pennsylvania. Tuigg was later appointed vicar for this area.

Pope Pius IX split the eastern part of the Diocese of Pittsburgh into the Diocese of Allegheny and named Bishop Michael Domenec of Pittsburgh as its first bishop. However, the boundaries set for the new diocese were unpopular in Pittsburgh as it saddled the Diocese of Pittsburgh with the most debt-ridden institutions.

=== Bishop of Pittsburgh ===
Pius IX named Tuigg as bishop of Pittsburgh on January 11, 1876. On March 19, 1876, he was consecrated in Saint Paul Cathedral in Pittsburgh by Archbishop James Frederick Bryan Wood.

Domenec believed that the diocesan boundaries between Pittsburgh and Allegheny were unfair. He traveled to Rome in early 1877 to advocate for the Diocese of Pittsburgh. After hearing from Domenec, Pius IX reversed his previous decision and agree to reunite the two dioceses as the Diocese of Pittsburgh. That same year, Domenec resigned as bishop of Allegheny.

On August 3, 1877, the pope also named Tuigg as apostolic administrator of the Diocese of Allegheny, which still existed, but now had no bishop.

When Tuigg became bishop, he found the Diocese of Pittsburgh deeply in debt due to Domenec's spending and the economic depression caused by the Panic of 1873. Tuigg succeeded in stabilizing the diocese's finances.

In 1881, Tuigg suffered a paralytic stroke, forcing him to take a leave of absence. Monsignor Richard Phelan, the vicar general, became apostolic administrator of the diocese. Tuigg eventually returned to work, but then suffered a second stroke. In 1885, Pope Leo XIII appointed Phelan as coadjutor bishop to run the diocese. At this time, the combined Pittsburgh and Allegheny dioceses contained 133 churches and 191 chapels, convents, and educational institutions. The Diocese of Allegheny was suppressed on July 1, 1889.

=== Death and legacy ===
John Tuigg died in Altoona, Pennsylvania, on December 7, 1889, at age 69. He is buried in the cemetery of St. John Parish in that city. Bishop Regis Canevin later described Tuigg;

It may be said of him that he combined the qualities of firmness and gentleness to a degree rarely found in the same individual; strong and unyielding when confident of the justice and propriety of any position he took, he was at the same time kind and courteous to those from whom he differed. Proofs of his executive ability, his piety, and his self-sacrificing zeal abound throughout the diocese over which God called him to rule, and which he left in better condition than it had known for some years.

— Regis Canevin, Bishop of Pittsburgh (1904–1920)

== Bibliography ==
- Glenn, Francis A. (1993). Shepherds of the Faith 1843-1993: A Brief History of the Bishops of the Catholic Diocese of Pittsburgh. Pittsburgh: Catholic Diocese of Pittsburgh. ISBN none.

Catholic Church titles
Preceded by Michael Domenec	Bishop of Pittsburgh; 1876–1889	Succeeded by Richard Phelan
