= John Dearden =

American prelate

His Eminence John Dearden
- Cardinal, Archbishop of Detroit
- Church: Roman Catholic Church
- See: Detroit
- Installed: December 18, 1958
- Term ended: July 15, 1980
- Predecessor: Edward Mooney
- Successor: Edmund Szoka
- Other post: Cardinal-Priest of San Pio X alla Balduina
- Previous post: Bishop of Pittsburgh (1950–1958)

Orders
- Ordination: December 8, 1932 by Francesco Marchetti Selvaggiani
- Consecration: May 18, 1948 by Amleto Giovanni Cicognani
- Created cardinal: April 28, 1969 by Paul VI

Personal details
- Born: October 15, 1907 Valley Falls, Rhode Island, U.S.
- Died: August 1, 1988 (aged 80) Southfield, Michigan, U.S.
- Motto: Servio in evangelio (Serve the gospel)

Styles of John Francis Dearden
- Reference style: His Eminence; The Most Reverend Eminence
- Spoken style: Your Eminence
- Religious style: Cardinal
- Informal style: Cardinal

John Francis Dearden (October 15, 1907 – August 1, 1988) was an American Catholic prelate who served as archbishop of Detroit in Michigan from 1958 to 1980, and was created a cardinal in 1969. He previously served as bishop of Pittsburgh in Pennsylvania from 1950 to 1958. During his tenure in Pittsburgh, Dearden earned the nickname "Iron John" for his stern manner of administration.

In Detroit, Dearden was active in community causes, supporting equal employment opportunities and better racial relations in the city. He played an influential role at the Second Vatican Council in Rome. Dearden also served as the first president of the National Conference of Catholic Bishops.

== Early life and education ==
John Dearden was born on October 15, 1907, in Valley Falls, Rhode Island, the eldest of five children of John Sidney and Agnes (née Gregory) Dearden. He received his early education at the parochial school of Holy Trinity Parish in Central Falls. At age 11, Dearden and his family moved to Cleveland, Ohio. He continued his education at St. Philomena School in East Cleveland, Ohio, and then attended Cathedral Latin High School in Chardon, Ohio, from 1921 to 1925.

In 1925, Dearden began his studies for the priesthood at St. Mary's Seminary in Cleveland. He graduated from St. Mary's in 1929, and was then sent to Rome to reside at the Pontifical North American College while studying at the Pontifical Gregorian University.

== Priesthood ==
On December 8, 1932, Dearden was ordained a priest for the Diocese of Cleveland by Cardinal Francesco Marchetti Selvaggiani in Rome. He earned a doctorate in theology from the Gregorian in 1934. Following his return to Ohio, he was assigned as a curate at St. Mary's Parish in Painesville, where he remained for three years. He then served as professor of philosophy (1937–1948) and rector (1944–1948) at St. Mary's Seminary. The Vatican raised Dearden to the rank of papal chamberlain on July 19, 1945.

== Episcopate ==
=== Bishop of Pittsburgh ===
On March 13, 1948, Dearden was appointed coadjutor bishop of Pittsburgh in and titular bishop of Sarepta by Pope Pius XII. He received his episcopal consecration on May 18, 1948, from Archbishop Amleto Giovanni Cicognani, with Bishops Edward Francis Hoban and Floyd Lawrence Begin serving as co-consecrators, at St. Agnes Church in Cleveland. After the death of Bishop Hugh Charles Boyle, Dearden automatically succeeded him as the seventh bishop of Pittsburgh on December 22, 1950.

During his tenure in Pittsburgh, Dearden earned the nickname "Iron John" for his stern manner of administration. In 1952, he issued new regulations on interfaith marriages. He allowed priests to officiate marriages between Catholics and non-Catholics in Catholic churches. However, he insisted that his actions,

"...must not be understood as mitigating in any degree the general rule of the church that is opposed in principle to such unions."

The Vatican named Dearden as an assistant at the pontifical throne in 1957.

=== Archbishop of Detroit ===
Following the death of Cardinal Edward Mooney, Dearden was appointed by Pope John XXIII as the second archbishop of Detroit on December 18, 1958.

After the Second Vatican Council in the early 1960s, Dearden dedicated himself to implementing its reforms in Detroit. He promoted greater participation of the laity in diocesan affairs and created a priests' senate.

In 1965, Dearden partnered with Cardinal Joseph Ritter to inaugurate Project Equality. This was an interfaith program asking businesses to pledge to a policy of non-discrimination in hiring and discharging employees. He also announced that the archdiocese would give preferential treatment to suppliers who gave equal opportunity to minority groups. As a member of the National Catholic Welfare Council, Dearden served as its treasurer, a member of its administrative board, and chair of its Committee on the Liturgical Apostolate. Dearden's commitment to racial justice frequently put him at odds with some priests and lay Catholics at the parish level who organized to fight neighborhood racial integration. Dearden in 1967 concluded that "the Negro-white confrontation in American cities is in great part a Negro-Catholic confrontation."

=== Cardinal ===
Pope Paul VI created Dearden as cardinal priest of the Church of San Pio X alla Balduina in Rome in the consistory of April 28, 1969.

When voters in 1970 amended the Michigan State Constitution to bar all taxpayer aid to private schools, Dearden ordered all the parishes parishes in Detroit to examine their finances and determine if their schools were a financial drain due to declining enrollment. Examining this data, he ordered the closing of 56 of the 269 schools in 1971. This raised an outcry from affected parishioners who were especially vexed as he was head of the bishops' conference at the time. After Pope Paul VI restored the permanent diaconate in 1967, Dearden was the first American prelate to establish such a program, ordaining thirteen married laymen as permanent deacons in 1971.

In October 1971, Dearden led the American delegation to the Third Extraordinary General Assembly of the Synod of Bishops in Rome. Its topics included social justice and the problem of declining numbers of seminarians and priests.During the synod, Dearden suggested that the Vatican investigate the sociological and psychological aspects of the priesthood.

Following the outbreak of the Watergate scandal in Washington, D.C. in 1973, Dearden issued a pastoral letter that stated, "These are difficult days for the country we love." He asked Catholics to observe the first three Fridays in November as days of prayer, penance and fasting in light of the nation's political turmoil. Dearden suffered a serious heart attack in April 1977.

Dearden served as a cardinal elector in the August 1978 papal conclave in Rome that elected Pope John Paul I. After John Paul died suddenly in September 1978, Dearden returned to Rome for the October 1978 conclave that selected Pope John Paul II.

=== Resignation and legacy ===
Three years after suffering a heart attack, Dearden resigned as Detroit's archbishop on July 15, 1980, after twenty-one years of service. On August 1, 1988, Dearden died from pancreatic cancer in Southfield, Michigan, at age 80. He was still a member of the Roman Curia's Congregation for the Sacraments at the time. He is buried in Holy Sepulchre Cemetery in Southfield.

== Initiatives ==
=== Second Vatican Council ===
During the Second Vatican Council, Dearden helped develop the Lumen gentium, released in 1964, and Gaudium et spes, released in 1965. During the council, he became more progressive in his views, becoming known as a "favorite of the liberals in the church."

=== NCCB/USCC presidency ===
Dearden was instrumental in 1966 in forming the National Conference of Catholic Bishops (NCCB) and its public-policy arm, the United States Catholic Conference (USCC). Dearden worked with the Booz Allen Hamilton firm to design the NCCB's structures and procedures. According to author George Weigel, this design gave the "...bureaucracy significant power and influence in U.S. Catholic affairs. As the conference’s voice increased, that of individual bishops tended to decrease."

From 1966 to 1971, Dearden served as the first NCCB president. As president, Dearden was known as "the unobtrusive liberal" for his emphasis on governing through consensus. During his tenure, the NCCB approved several liturgical reforms, including using English for the eucharistic prayer, authorizing extraordinary ministers of Communion, and holding Saturday evening masses.

=== Call to Action ===
After the Second Vatican Council, Dearden worked to establish a national pastoral council. Its purpose was to bring bishops, priests, religious, and lay people together to examine their "shared responsibility" on civic issues in the life of the Catholic Church. He had made several exploratory steps towards this as NCCB president. However, a 1973 letter from the Vatican to expressed concern over events in the American Catholic Church and placed a hold on any such council

A few years before the American Bicentennial in 1976, the NCCB named Dearden to head a committee that would formulate a Catholic contribution to this event. Its response was the Liberty and Justice for All Project, a vehicle for discussing peace and social justice issues. To gain input from the laity, the NCCB held hearings around the United States designated as "Calls to Action". Dearden stated this was to find out "how the American Catholic community can contribute to the quest of all people for liberty and justice." They took place in Atlanta, Minneapolis, Newark, Sacramento, San Antonio, and Washington, D.C. In these hearings, select group of 500 attendees were allowed to address panels that include bishops. Regional, diocesan, and parish groups were also given the option to hold their own meetings on the subject and they produced 800,000 responses.

The response from the hearings and the meetings were reviewed by eight preparatory committees which produced working papers and recommendations to be presented at the Call to Action conference held in the Detroit convention center with 1,340 delegates in attendance, 152 of which were appointed by bishops of the 167 American dioceses. Each of 92 national Catholic organizations were allowed to send a single delegate to represent them. Almost a third of all delegates were clergy (mostly priests with 110 bishops) and another third were women. Half of all the delegates were church employees. The delegates broke into small groups using the working papers as a basis of discussion but free to make their own recommendations to the NCCB/USCC.

In the end, the conference made 29 recommendations divided into 218 separate items. Many of the suggestions were viewed as radical:

"Among them were recommendations for returning laicized priests to the ministry, the ordination of married men and of women, lay preachers, freedom to practice contraception, an open attitude toward homosexuality, and reception of communion by divorced and remarried Catholics. The recommendations of a social and political nature included ones supporting amnesty for Vietnam war resisters and for undocumented immigrants...[and] a recommendation backing the proposed Equal Rights Amendment to the Constitution".

The NCCB received the recommendations with thanks but many bishops were unhappy with the results. The NCCB then appointed a committee to oversee their implementation, which then shelved them. The fruitless outcome of the conference ended any efforts of Dearden to work for a full national pastoral council.

== Media coverage ==
Dearden drew the attention of the national media for "his innovative approach to the new liturgy and teachings." He was characterized as a "progressive" by the New York Times in 1988 and a "liberal". Dearden was condemned by The Wanderer in 1974 as "a major heretic, one of the worst the Catholic Church has ever suffered from." The New York Times speculated that in 1979 when Pope John Paul II came to New York City to address the United Nations, he "snubbed" Dearden by not scheduling a visit to Detroit. Instead, the pope met with Cardinal John Cody, "... whose conservatism the Pope found more to his liking." Despite his liberal outlook, Dearden refused to support the ordination of women as priests, citing "...too many theological objections".

Catholic Church titles
Preceded by Hugh Charles Boyle	Bishop of Pittsburgh; 1950–1958	Succeeded by John Wright
Preceded by Edward Mooney	Archbishop of Detroit; 1958–1980	Succeeded by Edmund Szoka
