= Michael O'Connor (American bishop) =

Irish-born American Catholic prelate (1810–1872)

His Excellency, The Right Reverend Michael O'Connor S.J.
- Bishop of Pittsburgh
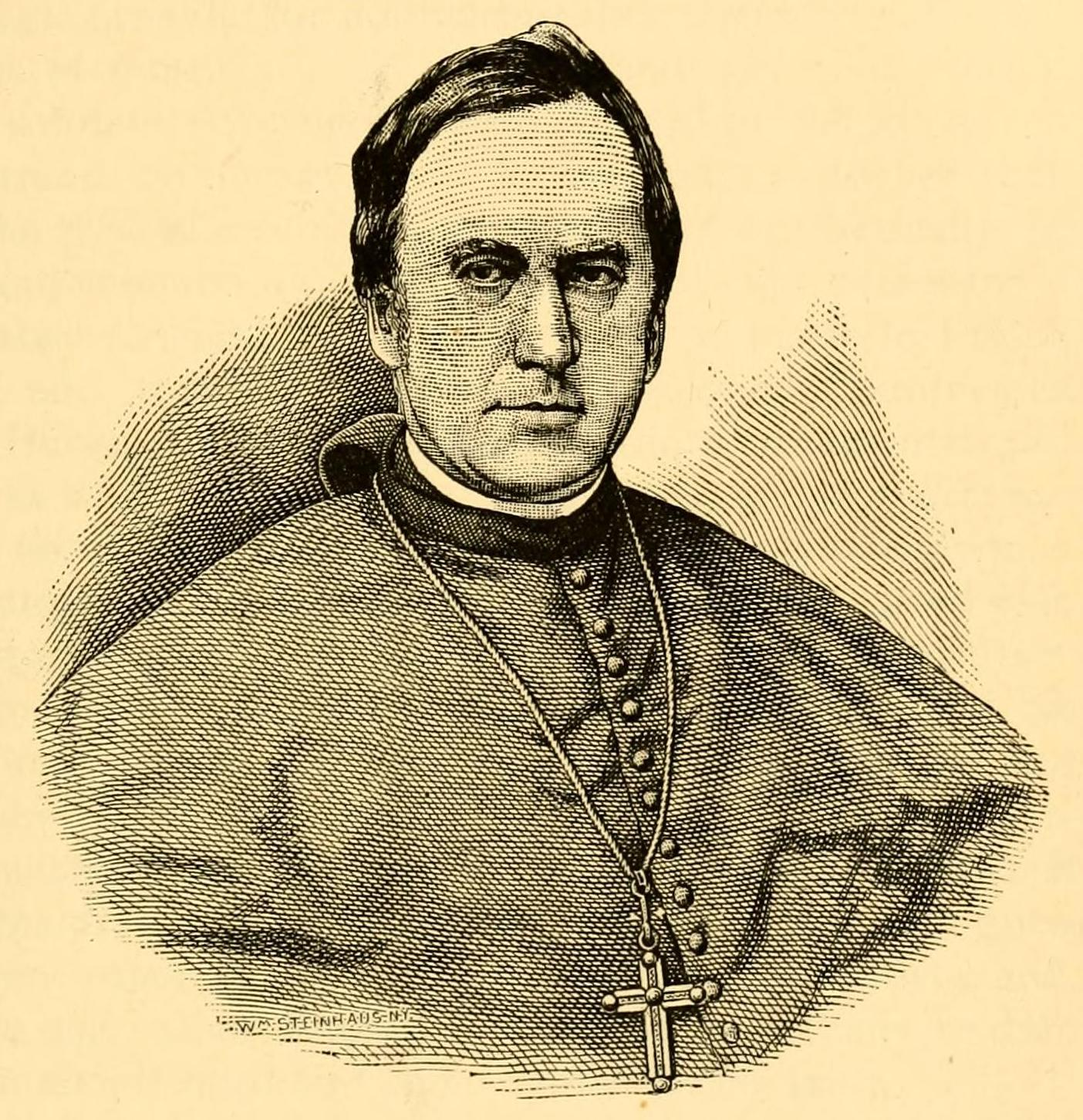
- See: Diocese of Pittsburgh
- In office: August 15, 1843 – July 29, 1853; December 20, 1853 – May 23, 1860
- Successor: Michael Domenec, C.M.
- Other post: Bishop of Erie (July 29, 1853 - December 20, 1853)

Orders
- Ordination: June 1, 1833 by Costantino Patrizi Naro
- Consecration: August 15, 1843 by Giacomo Filippo Fransoni

Personal details
- Born: September 27, 1810 Cobh, County Cork, Ireland, United Kingdom of Great Britain and Ireland
- Died: October 18, 1872 (aged 62) Woodstock, Maryland, US
- Education: Urban College of the Propaganda
- Motto: Satis est prostrasse leoni (It is enough to lay down for the lion)

Styles of Michael O'Connor
- Reference style: His Excellency; The Right Reverend
- Spoken style: Your Excellency
- Religious style: Bishop

Michael O'Connor, S.J. (September 27, 1810 – October 18, 1872) was an Irish-born prelate of the Roman Catholic Church in the United States and a member of the Society of Jesus. He served twice as bishop of the Diocese of Pittsburgh in Pennsylvania (1843 to early 1853 and late 1853 to 1860). O'Connor served briefly as bishop of the Diocese of Erie in Pennsylvania for several months in 1853.

== Biography ==
=== Early life ===
Michael O'Connor was born on September 27, 1810, in Cobh, near the city of Cork, in County Cork, Ireland, then part of United Kingdom. His younger brother, James O'Connor, would serve as the first bishop of Omaha from 1885 to 1891. Michael O'Connor received his early education in Cobh, where he attended the parish school of the Cathedral of Cloyne. When O'Connor reached age 14, Bishop William Coppinger of the Catholic Diocese of Cloyne and Ross sent him to France to begin his studies for the priesthood.

After finishing in France, O'Connor entered the Urban College of the Propaganda in Rome. He completed his courses in philosophy and theology with distinction, and won a gold medal for being the first in mathematics. O'Connor finished his course work before reaching the canonical age for ordination, forcing him to wait to become a priest. He spent the interval teaching sacred scriptures at the College of Propaganda. O'Connor earned a Doctor of Divinity degree following a public disputation, in which he underwent the same test made by the theologians Thomas Aquinas and Bonaventure at the University of Paris in the 13th century.

== Priesthood ==
O'Connor was ordained a priest in Rome for the Diocese of Cloyne and Ross on June 1, 1833, by Archbishop Costantino Patrizi Naro. After his ordination, the diocese appointed O'Connor as vice-rector of the Pontifical Irish College, the seminary for Irish students in Rome. He also served as an agent of the Irish bishops with the Vatican working with Pope Gregory XVI and Cardinal Nicholas Wiseman.

When O'Connor returned to Ireland in 1834, the diocese assigned him as a curate in Fermoy, County Cork He also served as chaplain for the convent of the Presentation Sisters in Doneraile, County Cork He applied for the position of professor of dogmatic theology at Maynooth College in Maynooth, County Kildare. However, Reverend Peter Kenrick, an Irish priest serving in the United States, persuaded O'Connor to find a teaching position.

In 1839, Patrick Kenrick's brother, Bishop Francis Kenrick, invited O'Connor to join the faculty of St. Charles Borromeo Seminary in Philadelphia, Pennsylvania. O'Connor accepted the offer and arrived in Philadelphia later that year. He immediately took the chair of theology at St. Charles. O'Connor also served as pastor at mission churches in Norristown, Pennsylvania and West Chester, Pennsylvania twice a month. He also founded St. Francis Xavier Parish in the Fairmount section of Philadelphia. In 1840, O'Connor left his other positions to serve as president of St. Charles Seminary.

In June 1841, O'Connor went to Pittsburgh, Pennsylvania, to serve as vicar general of Western Pennsylvania. He was also appointed pastor of St. Paul's Parish in Pittsburgh. He established a parochial school and organized a literary society for young men.

=== Bishop of Pittsburgh (1843–1853) ===
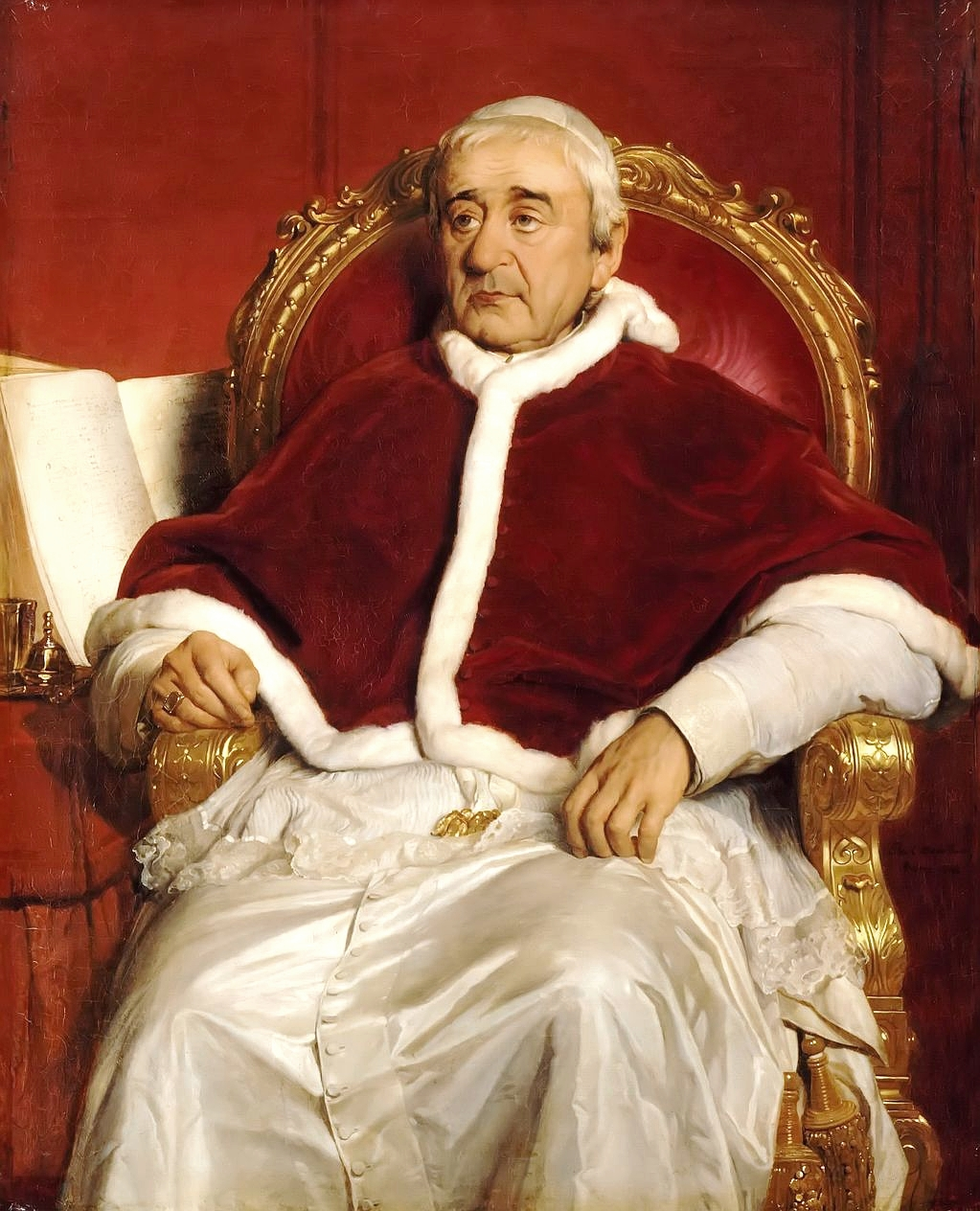
Pope Gregory XVI (1844)

Given the population growth in Western Pennsylvania, the bishops meeting at Fifth Provincial Council of Baltimore in May 1843 decided that the area needed its own diocese. They recommended that the pope erect the Diocese of Pittsburgh and appoint O'Connor as its first bishop. When Pope Gregory XVI accepted the recommendation, O'Connor traveled to Rome for hisconsecration as a bishop. However, once in Rome, he petitioned the pope to revoke his appointment, saying he wanted to join the Society of Jesus and work as one of their priests. Gregory refused, telling O'Connor, "You shall be bishop first, and a Jesuit afterwards".

O'Connor accepted the pope's decision and was formally appointed the first bishop of Pittsburgh on August 11, 1843. On August 15, 1843, he received his consecration from Cardinal Giacomo Fransoni at the Church of Sant'Agata dei Goti in Rome.Before returning to Pittsburgh in December 1843, O'Connor stopped in Ireland to recruit seminarians and religious sisters for his new diocese. He persuaded eight seminarians from Maynooth College and seven Sisters of Mercy to accompany him.

The new Diocese of Pittsburgh contained 33 churches staffed by 14 priests that were serving approximately 25,000 Catholics. To organize the new diocese, O'Connor held the first diocesan synod in 1844. That same year, he founded a girls' academy, a chapel for Catholic African Americans, and St. Michael's Seminary in Pittsburgh. He also created a diocesan newspaper, the Pittsburgh Catholic

To serve the large German immigrant population in his diocese, O'Connor welcomed a contingent of Benedictine monks who founded Saint Vincent Archabbey in Latrobe, Pennsylvania. He also brought in the Franciscan Brothers from Mountbellew in County Galway, Ireland, who established their first American community in Loretto, Pennsylvania.

=== Bishop of Erie (1853) ===
On July 29, 1853, O'Connor was appointed the first bishop of the newly erected Diocese of Erie by Pope Pius IX. The pope appointed Reverend Joshua Young as the second bishop of Pittsburgh. However, Young was reluctant to take the appointment, Meanwhile, Catholics in Pittsburgh sent a petition to the pope asking him to return O'Connor as their bishop.

=== Bishop of Pittsburgh (1853–1860) ===
On December 20, 1853, five months after his transfer to Erie, Pius IX reappointed O'Connor as bishop of Pittsburgh.Young accepted the leadership of Erie.

In 1854, O'Connor was summoned to the Vatican to participate in discussions on the dogma of the Immaculate Conception. According to church historian Richard Clarke, many wording changes in the final decree were suggested by O'Connor. After the trip to Rome, his health began to decline. On the advice of his doctors, O'Connors traveled to other countries to search for a milder climate than Pennsylvania. At the end of O'Connor's tenure, the diocese contained 77 churches, 86 priests, six religious congregations, one seminary, five institutions of higher education, two orphan asylums, one hospital, and a Catholic population of 50,000.

=== Resignation and later life ===
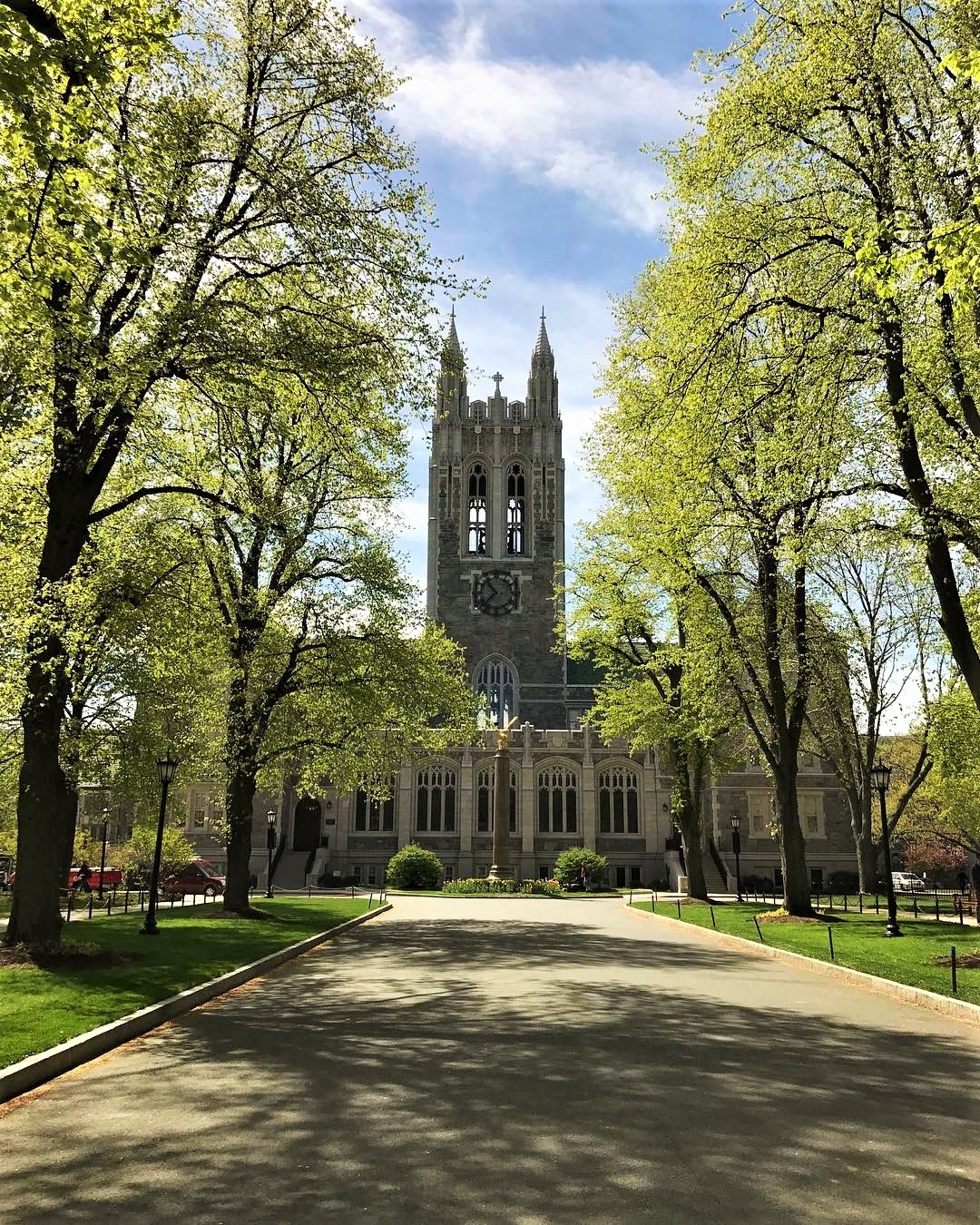
Boston College, Boston, Massachusetts (2018)

O'Connor resigned as bishop of Pittsburgh on May 23, 1860. In October 1860, he left Pittsburgh for Europe. On December 22, 1860, he was admitted into the Jesuit novitiate at Gorheim, (now part of Sigmaringen), in what was then Kingdom of Prussia. In 1862, after completing the novitiate, Jesuit Superior General Peter Jan Beckx allowed O'Connor to make his solemn profession of the four religious vows immediately, bypassing the normal 15 years of full formation.

After his solemn profession, the Jesuits assigned O'Connor to the Jesuit community in Boston, Massachusetts, where he made his religious profession on December 23, 1862. When Boston College was founded in 1864, he began teaching theology there. He was also appointed socius (counselor) to the Provincial Superior of the Jesuits in the United States, a position in which he remained until his death. O'Connor took a special interest in the spiritual welfare of African Americans, and delivered lectures in many parts of the United States and Canada.

His health failing, O'Connor was sent to rest at Woodstock College in Woodstock, Maryland, in the spring of 1872. He died there on October 18, 1872, at age 62. He is buried in the Jesuit cemetery at Woodstock.

Catholic Church titles
Preceded by none	Bishop of Pittsburgh; 1843–1853	Succeeded by vacant
Preceded by none	Bishop of Erie; 1853–1854	Succeeded by Joshua Maria Young
Preceded by vacant	Bishop of Pittsburgh; 1854–1860	Succeeded by Michael Domenec
