= Michael Domenec =

Spanish prelate

His Excellency, The Most Reverend Michael Domenec C.M., D.D.
- Bishop of Allegheny
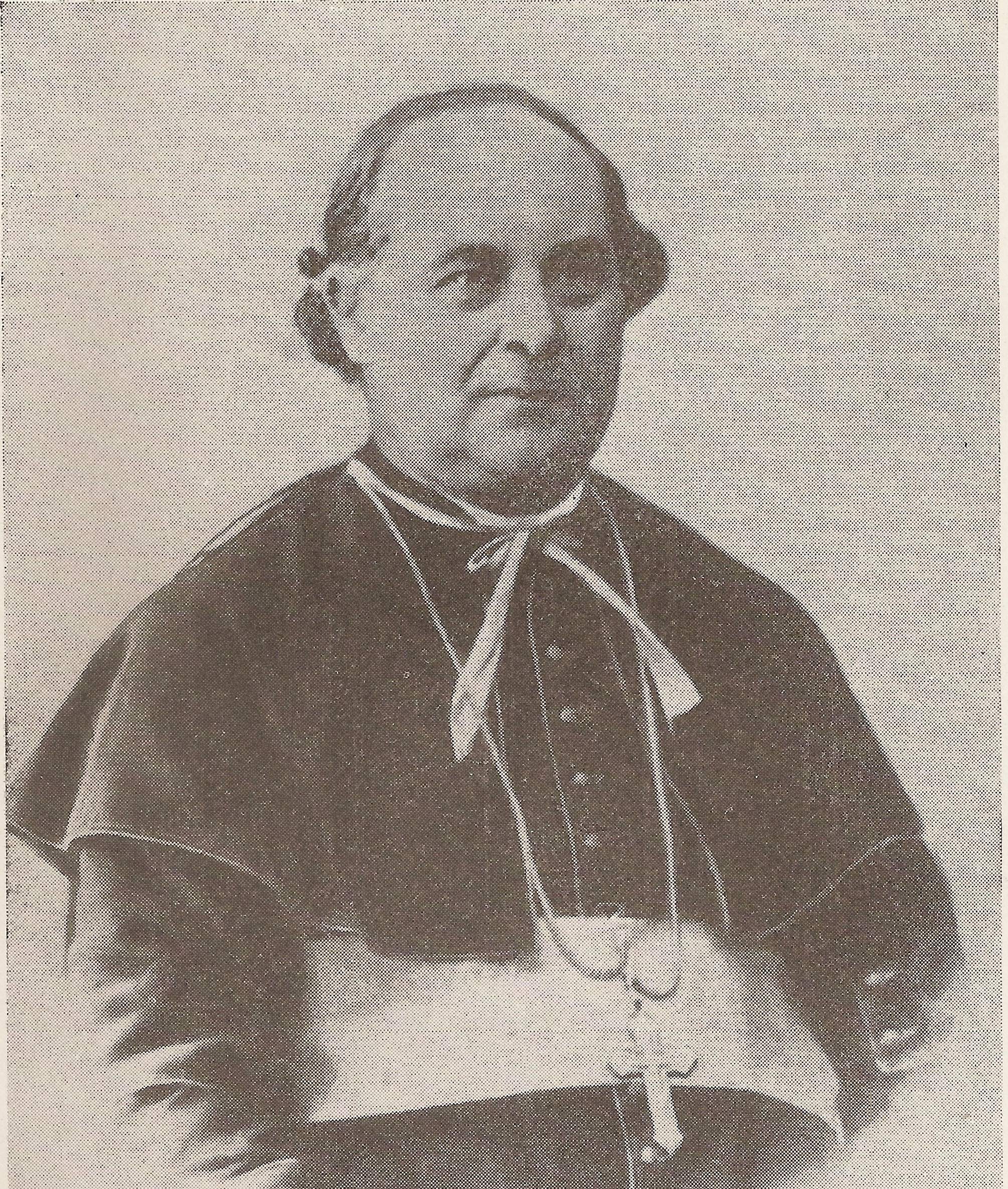
- Church: Roman Catholic Church
- See: Diocese of Allegheny
- In office: March 19, 1876– July 29, 1877
- Predecessor: none
- Successor: none
- Previous posts: Bishop of Pittsburgh (Dec. 9, 1860 – Jan. 11, 1876)

Orders
- Ordination: June 30, 1839 by Joseph Rosati
- Consecration: December 9, 1860 by Francis Kenrick

Personal details
- Born: Miquel Joan Josep Domènech i Veciana; December 27, 1816 Reus, Spain
- Died: January 7, 1878 (aged 61) Tarragona, Spain
- Motto: Veni Sancte Spiritus (Come Holy Ghost)

Styles of Michael Domenec
- Reference style: His Excellency; The Right Reverend
- Spoken style: Your Excellency
- Religious style: Bishop

Michael Domenec C.M. (Catalan: Miquel Domènech i Veciana; Spanish: Miquel Joan Josep Domènech i Veciana) (December 27, 1816– January 5, 1878) was a Spanish-born prelate of the Roman Catholic Church who served as the only bishop of Allegheny in Pennsylvania from 1876 to 1877.

Domenec previously served as bishop of Pittsburgh in Pennsylvania from 1860 to 1876. He was a member of the Congregation of the Mission (Vincentians).

== Biography ==
=== Early life ===
Michael Domenec was born on December 27, 1816, and baptized the same day at Saint Peter Church in Reus in the Kingdom of Spain.^{[a]} His parents, Josep Domènech and Tecla Viciana, belonged to a wealthy family. (American sources spell the family name "Domenec.") His early education was received at Madrid, Spain.

The outbreak in 1833 of the First Carlist War in Spain forced the Domenec family, including 15-year-old Michael, to flee to France. He then continued his studies at a college in Montolieu, France, operated by the Vincentians. While there, he decided to join their order, later moving to Maison Mère, the Vincentian motherhouse and headquarters in Paris.

Domenec in 1838 met Reverend John Timon, the visitor general of the Vincentians in the United States, during his visit to Maison Mère. Timon persuaded Domenec to complete his studies for the priesthood at St. Mary's of the Barrens, a Vincentian seminary in Perryville, Missouri, in the United States. After arriving in Missouri, Domenec soon became fluent in English and was teaching at St. Mary's. He acquired a reputation as a good orator.

=== Priesthood ===
Domenec was ordained for the Vincentians in Perryville by Bishop Joseph Rosati to the priesthood on June 30, 1839. In 1845, the Vincentians sent Domenec to Philadelphia, Pennsylvania, to head St. Vincent's Seminary in that city. He was also appointed pastor of St. Stephen's Parish in Nicetown, Pennsylvania. When the Vincentians moved the seminary in 1851 to Germantown, Pennsylvania, he became pastor of the new St. Vincent de Paul Parish there.

=== Bishop of Pittsburgh ===
On September 28, 1860, Domenec was appointed by Pope Pius IX as the second bishop of Pittsburgh. Domenec was consecrated in Saint Paul's Cathedral in Pittsburgh by Archbishop Francis Kenrick on December 9, 1860. Arriving in Pittsburgh, Domenec found the diocese in good order: "well-supplied with priests and churches, and finely equipped institutions". In 1862, Domenec visited Rome for at the canonization of the Japanese martyrs, 26 Catholics who had been executed by Toyotomi Hideyoshi, the Japanese shogun.

When the American Civil War ended in 1865, the diocese had substantial debt. However, Domenec continued to borrow money to improve the cathedral and build churches, convents, and schools. In 1869, he attended the First Vatican Council in Rome. However, with the economic depression that followed the panic of 1873, the diocese could no longer meet its obligations.

=== Bishop of Allegheny ===
The growth of Diocese of Pittsburgh prompted the Vatican in 1875 to erect another diocese to support the Catholic population. On January 11, 1876, Pope Pius IX erected the Diocese of Allegheny from the Diocese Pittsburgh and appointed Domenec as its first bishop. However, the boundaries set for the new diocese were unpopular in Pittsburgh as it saddled the Diocese of Pittsburgh with the most debt-ridden institutions.

Domenec also believed that the boundaries were unfair. He traveled to Rome in early 1877 to advocate for the Diocese of Pittsburgh. Pius IX then reversed his previous decision and the two dioceses were reunited. While still in Rome, Domenec resigned as bishop of Allegheny.

=== Resignation and legacy ===
While awaiting a new assignment from the Vatican, Domenec travelled to Barcelona, Spain, in the fall of 1877 to preach in the churches there. After catching pneumonia at Tarragona, Michael Domenec died there on January 7, 1878. He is entombed in the Cathedral of Tarragona.

== Notes ==
1. Many sources on Domenec's life spell Reus as "Ruez"; at least one correctly spells the city's name. His full name and the names of his parents are recorded in the parish's baptismal records (Book 20, Folio 109, 27 December 1816).

== Sources ==
=== Bibliography ===
- Glenn, Francis A. (1993). Shepherds of the Faith, 1843–1993: A Brief History of the Bishops of the Catholic Diocese of Pittsburgh. Pittsburgh: Catholic Diocese of Pittsburgh. ISBN none.

Catholic Church titles
Preceded by Michael O'Connor	Bishop of Pittsburgh; 1860–1876	Succeeded by John Tuigg
