= Roman Catholic Diocese of Allegheny =

Titular see in the Roman Catholic Church

Coordinates: 40°45′N 80°02′W

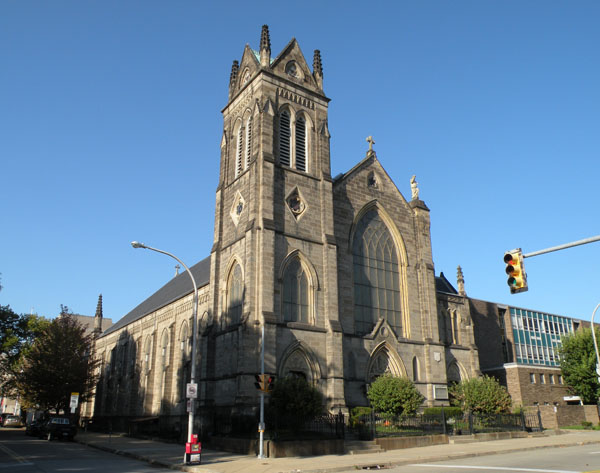
St. Peter's Church in the present-day North Side of Pittsburgh served as the cathedral of the Diocese of Allegheny from 1876 until 1889.

The Diocese of Allegheny (Latin: Dioecesis Alleghenensis) was a Latin Church diocese of the Catholic Church, in the state of Pennsylvania from 1876–1889. It is currently an episcopal titular see, known in Latin as Dioecesis Alleghenensis.

== History ==
In November 1875, Bishop Michael Domenec of the Diocese of Pittsburgh traveled to Rome to request the division of the Diocese of Pittsburg, and the formation of a new diocese with Allegheny City as its see. Priests and people were taken by surprise when the division was announced.

The diocese was created on 11 January 1876 with territory split from the Diocese of Pittsburgh, as a fellow suffragan of the Metropolitan Archdiocese of Philadelphia. Domenec was appointed as its first ordinary, and missioner John Tuigg of Altoona, vicar-general of Pittsburgh, was appointed to succeed him in Pittsburgh.

The Panic of 1873 had been a financial disaster for the Pittsburgh diocese. The division was unpopular in Pittsburgh, as it complicated the financial situation and left those by institutions most in debt to the Pittsburgh diocese.

Bishop Domenec resigned the See of Allegheny 27 July, 1877, and retired to his native land, where he died at Tarragona, 7 January, 1878. Bishop John Tuigg, who was serving as Bishop of Pittsburgh, was appointed Apostolic Administrator.

On 1 July 1889, the see was suppressed as a residential diocese and its territory was reunited with the diocese of Pittsburgh.

== Former territory ==
Territory of the former diocese

At its creation, the Diocese of Allegheny covered eight counties and an area of 6,530 square miles (16,900 km^{2}), leaving the Diocese of Pittsburgh with six counties and an area of 4,784 square miles (12,390 km^{2}). Allegheny County was split unevenly between the two dioceses, with most of that county remaining in the Diocese of Pittsburgh.

The Rev. Andrew Lambing, an early historian of the Catholic Diocese of Pittsburgh, described the boundary lines as follows:

The dividing line between the sees of Pittsburgh and Allegheny started at the southern boundary of the State between Bedford and Somerset counties, and passed north till it reached Cambria, and thence west to Westmoreland. Passing along the eastern, southern, and western boundary of this county, it struck the Allegheny River, and passed down that stream and the Ohio to the western limits of Allegheny City. From that point it struck due north through Allegheny County to the southern boundary of Butler, and continued west and north to the line dividing Lawrence and Mercer counties. It then followed that line to the western boundary of the State.

== Titular Bishops ==
1. George L. Leech: 1972-1985 as bishop emeritus of the Diocese of Harrisburg
2. Edward Egan: 1985-1988 as auxiliary bishop of the Archdiocese of New York
3. Patrick J. McGrath: 1988-1998 as auxiliary bishop of the Archdiocese of San Francisco
4. Robert Joseph McManus: 1998-2004 as auxiliary bishop of the Diocese of Providence
5. John Walter Flesey: 2004-incumbent as auxiliary bishop of the Archdiocese of Newark

== References and works cited ==
Works cited

- Lambing, Andrew Arnold (1880), A history of the Catholic church in the dioceses of Pittsburgh and Allegheny from its establishment to the present time, New York: Benziger Brothers
- Annuario Pontificio, Libreria Editrice Vaticana, 2013, ISBN 978-88-209-9070-1

== Sources and external links ==
- GigaCatholic, with incumbent biographies
- New York Times story on the reconsolidation of the see with Pittsburgh (subscription required for full article)
