= Regis Canevin =

American prelate

His Excellency, The Most Reverend John Francis Regis Canevin
- Bishop of Pittsburgh; Archbishop of Pelusium
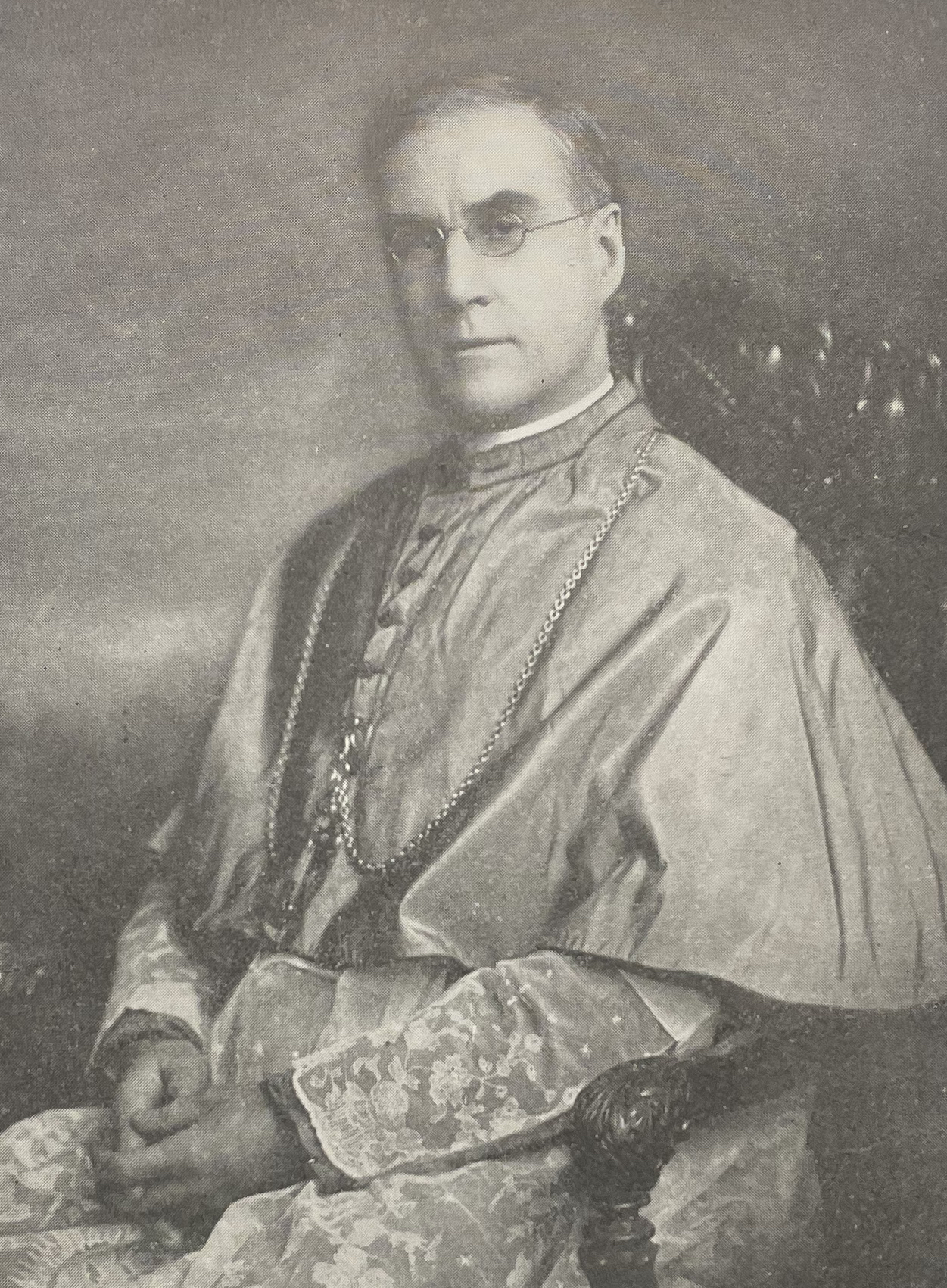
- Church: Roman Catholic Church
- Diocese: Diocese of Pittsburgh
- Appointed: January 16, 1903
- Predecessor: Richard Phelan
- Successor: Hugh Charles Boyle

Orders
- Ordination: June 4, 1879 by John Tuigg
- Consecration: February 24, 1903 by Patrick John Ryan

Personal details
- Born: June 5, 1853 Westmoreland County, Pennsylvania, US
- Died: March 22, 1927 (aged 73) Pittsburgh, Pennsylvania, US
- Motto: Dominus aedificet domum (May the Lord build the house)

Styles of Regis Canevin
- Reference style: The Right Reverend
- Spoken style: Your Excellency
- Religious style: Archbishop

John Francis Regis Canevin (June 5, 1853 – March 22, 1927) was an American prelate of the Catholic Church. He served as bishop of the Diocese of Pittsburgh in Pennsylvania from 1904 to 1921. He was named a personal archbishop in 1904.

== Biography ==
=== Early life ===
Regis Canevin was born on June 5, 1853, in Beatty, Pennsylvania, to Thomas and Rosanna Canevin, on a farm owned by the Sisters of Mercy. After receiving his early education at schools in Beatty, he entered St. Vincent College in Latrobe, Pennsylvania, in 1871 and St. Vincent Seminary in Latrobe in 1875.

=== Priesthood ===
Canevin was ordained to the priesthood for the Diocese of Pittsburgh by Bishop John Tuigg on June 4, 1879, in Pittsburgh, Pennsylvania. After his ordination, the diocese assigned Canevin as a curate at St. Mary's Parish in Pittsburgh, where he remained until 1881. He then served in the same capacity at St. Paul's Cathedral Parish in Pittsburgh for five years. In 1886, Canevin became chaplain at St. Paul's Orphan Asylum and the Western Penitentiary, both in Pittsburgh. He was also appointed as pastor of the mission church in Canonsburg, Pennsylvania. In 1888, Canevin was named chancellor of the diocese. He left that position in 1893 to serve as pastor of St. Philip's Church in Crafton, Pennsylvania. Canevin was named rector of St. Paul's Cathedral in 1895.

=== Coadjutor Bishop and Bishop of Pittsburgh ===
On January 16, 1903, Canevin was appointed coadjutor bishop of Pittsburgh and titular bishop of Sabratha by Pope Leo XIII. He received his episcopal consecration on February 24, 1903, at Saint Paul Cathedral from Archbishop Patrick Ryan, with Bishops John W. Shanahan and Leo Haid serving as co-consecrators.

On the death of Bishop Richard Phelan, Canevin automatically succeeded him to become the fifth bishop of Pittsburgh on December 20, 1904. He was the first American and the first native son of the diocese to become bishop. He penned the article on the "Diocese of Pittsburgh" for the Catholic Encyclopedia.

=== Retirement and death ===
On January 9, 1921, Pope Benedict XV accepted Canevin's resignation as bishop of Pittsburgh and appointed him as titular archbishop of Pelusium. Regis Canevin died on March 22, 1927, at Mercy Hospital in Pittsburgh at age 73. He is buried at St. Mary Cemetery in Lawrenceville, Pennsylvania.

Catholic Church titles
| Preceded by Richard Phelan | Bishop of Pittsburgh; 1904–1921 | Succeeded by Hugh Charles Boyle |
