= Cardinal Mooney High School (Ohio) =

Private Catholic high school in Youngstown, Ohio, U.S.

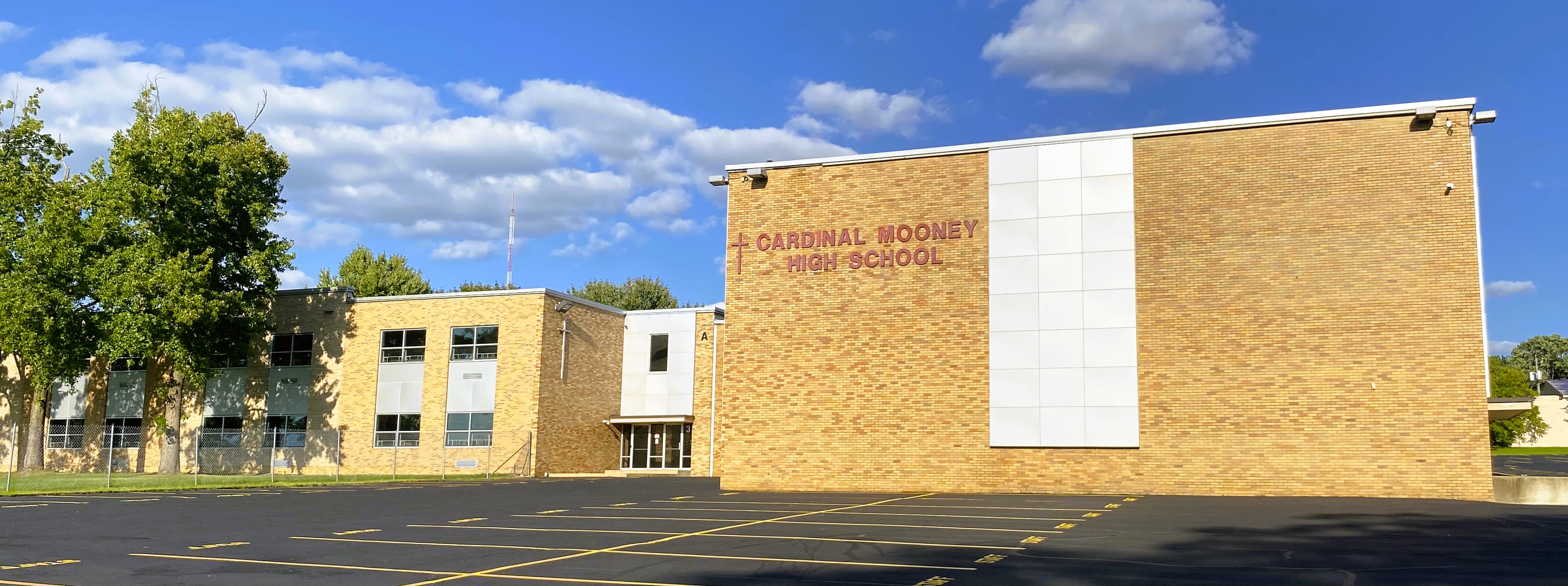

Location
- 2545 Erie Street; Youngstown, Ohio 44507; United States; 41°4′28″N 80°39′6″W

Information
- Type: Private secondary school
- Motto: Sanctity, Scholarship, and Discipline
- Religious affiliation: Roman Catholic
- Established: 1956
- President: Pat Kiraly
- Principal: Brendan Considine
- Teaching staff: 41 (on an FTE basis)
- Grades: 9–12
- Enrollment: 478 (2023–2024)
- Colors: Red and gold
- Nickname: Cardinal
- Newspaper: The Beakon
- Yearbook: The Eminence
- Website: www.cardinalmooney.com

Cardinal Mooney High School is a private coeducational Catholic high school in Youngstown, Ohio, United States. Athletic teams are known as the Cardinals and they compete as a member of the Ohio High School Athletic Association. It is affiliated with the Roman Catholic Diocese of Youngstown.

== History ==
=== Founding and early history ===
Cardinal Mooney was founded in 1956 and is run by the Roman Catholic Diocese of Youngstown. In the early 1950s, the Diocese of Youngstown recognized the need to expand Ursuline High School and to build a new parochial high school on the southside. In 1953, Bishop Emmet M. Walsh obtained the present site of Cardinal Mooney High School from the Youngstown Parks Department and began the organization of a high school fundraising committee.

Ground was broken in 1954, and in the fall of 1955 the first freshman class was organized and began attending classes at the old Glenmary convent. Construction of Cardinal Mooney was completed in time for the first day of school in September 1956. A total of 610 students were enrolled as freshmen or sophomores. The school was named after Cardinal Edward Mooney, a former southsider, who was the Archbishop of Detroit. He had distinguished himself as a scholar and Vatican diplomat.

Enrollments grew rapidly in the early '60's. By 1960 an addition to Cardinal Mooney was being planned and an overflow of students were once again attending classes at the old Glenmary Convent. The addition opened in 1961. It included an auditorium, seven classrooms and a physics laboratory.

=== Expansion and relocation discussions ===
In early 2000, Cardinal Mooney came into possession of the two military annex buildings adjacent to the school grounds. Shortly after obtaining this real estate, construction of the high school's new sports complex was underway. Completed in late 2001, the Cardinal Mooney sports complex yields a well rounded athletic training facility where official OHSAA athletic contests can be hosted. The complex includes a regulation football field, two adjacent practice fields, two tennis courts, a practice putting green, a practice soccer field, two practice baseball fields, a small batting cage, a training pool, and a full-length, rubberized track encircling the main football field. The U.S. Army and U.S. Navy annex buildings were left standing during construction, but Rush Boulevard was filled in with top soil and cut off from the rear lot. The buildings, now referred to as the Cardinal Mooney Industrial Arts Center, have since been converted to garages where shop classes can work on vehicles and driving classes can be taught during the summer breaks.

On September 3, 2013, Bishop of the Roman Catholic Diocese of Youngstown, George Murry, approved the relocation of the high school from Youngstown's south side to the suburbs of Mahoning County. However, his approval was met with stipulations that included proof of sufficient financial support for both a new high school building as well as an endowment fund to provide scholarships for students who face poverty and other social constraints. A study released in April 2013 (conducted by Catholic School Management, Inc. in Madison, Connecticut) determined that the school would sustain a better enrollment and for a longer period of time if it relocated.

Bishop Murry originally opposed the move, stating that a large factor in this decision was that it would be cheaper to make renovations than to build a new building. In addition, he said in his statement, it is important for the diocese to be good stewards of their finances. The diocesan superintendent of Catholic schools echoed Murry's original stance and acknowledged the plans that can be put into effect for the future of the school at its present location. The topic has been one of controversy among parents and alumni since discussion of the move began in 2013. In 2015, renovations to Cardinal Mooney took place.

== Athletics ==
=== State championships ===
- Boy' golf – 1988, 1989
- Boys' soccer – 2002
- Boys' track and field – 1990
- Boy's cross country – 1999
- Football – 1973, 1980, 1982, 1987, 2004, 2006, 2009, 2011

=== Associated Press poll winners ===
- Football – 1981, 1987, 1999, 2006, 2007, 2009

== Notable alumni ==
- Tim Beck - college football coach
- Donald D'Alesio - professional football coach in the National Football League (NFL)
- Jerry Diorio - former professional football coach in the National Football League (NFL)
- Derrell Johnson-Koulianos - college football coach
- Ishmaa'ily Kitchen, former professional football player in the National Football League (NFL)
- Ed Muransky, former professional football player in the National Football League (NFL)
- Bo Pelini - former college head coach
- Carl Pelini, former college head coach
- Ed Policy - president and CEO of the Green Bay Packers
- John Simon, former professional football player in the National Football League (NFL)
- Bob Stoops - professional football head coach
- Mark Stoops- college football head coach
- Mike Stoops - college football coach
- Denise DeBartolo York - owner of the San Francisco 49ers and Leeds United F.C.
- Edward J. DeBartolo Jr. - businessman, former owner of the San Francisco 49ers
- John Edward "Jed" York - businessman, CEO for the San Francisco 49ers
- Mark Malaska, former professional baseball player in the Major League Baseball (MLB)
- Ray "Boom Boom" Mancini, former lightweight WBA World Champion boxer
- Michael J. Moritz Jr., Tony Award Winner, Emmy Award Winner, Broadway producer.
- James Traficant, former Congressman for Ohio's 17th congressional district
