= Basilica of Our Lady of Mount Carmel (Youngstown, Ohio) =

Historic church in Ohio, United States

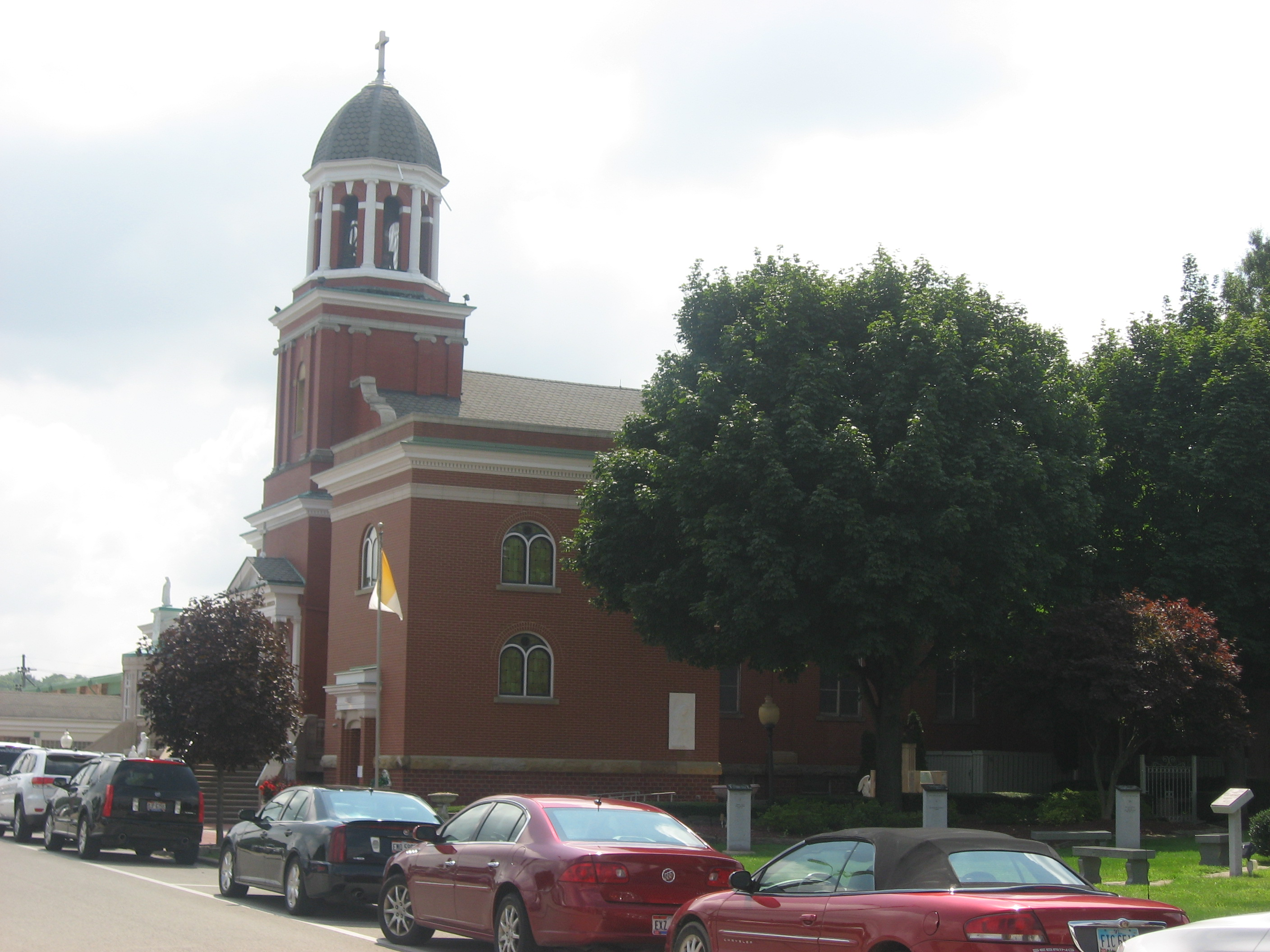
- Basilica of Our Lady of Mount Carmel
- 41°05′59″N 80°38′31″W
- Location: 343 Via Mt. Carmel; Youngstown, Ohio
- Country: United States
- Denomination: Catholic Church
- Sui iuris church: Latin Church
- Website: olmcsta.com

History
- Founded: 1908
- Dedication: Our Lady of Mount Carmel
- Dedicated: November 4, 1916

Architecture
- Architectural type: Italian Baroque
- Groundbreaking: 1909
- Completed: 1916

Specifications
- Materials: Brick

Administration
- Diocese: Youngstown

Clergy
- Bishop: Most Rev. David Bonnar
- Rector: Msgr. John Zuraw
- Vicar: Rev. John Rovnak
- Our Lady of Mount Carmel Church
- U.S. National Register of Historic Places
- NRHP reference No.: 79001893
- Added to NRHP: May 10, 1979

The Basilica of Our Lady of Mount Carmel is a Catholic minor basilica in Youngstown, Ohio, United States. It was founded as a mission of St Anthony of Padua Church by the Rev. Emmanuel Stabile in 1908, and served local Italian immigrants who were attending Mass at St. Columba Cathedral and Saints Cyril and Methodius Church. Construction for the basement of the present church building was begun in October 1909 and it was roofed over and used for Mass until the church itself was completed in 1916. In the meantime, Our Lady of Mount Carmel became a parish in 1913 with the Rev. Vito Franco as the first resident pastor.

In 1979, the church building was listed on the National Register of Historic Places because of its association with European immigration and its architecture. Our Lady of Mount Carmel parish was merged with its founding parish, St. Anthony of Padua, in 2011. The church was elevated to a minor basilica in 2014 by Pope Francis.

Each year, an Italian festival is held at the end of July, in the church's parking lot.
