= James William Malone =

American prelate

His Excellency, The Most Reverend James William Malone
- Bishop of Youngstown; Titular Bishop of Alabanda
- Church: Roman Catholic Church
- See: Diocese of Youngstown
- Appointed: May 2, 1968
- In office: May 2, 1968— December 5, 1995
- Predecessor: Emmet M. Walsh
- Successor: Thomas Joseph Tobin
- Previous post: Auxiliary Bishop of Youngstown (1960-1968)

Orders
- Ordination: May 26, 1945 by James A. McFadden
- Consecration: March 24, 1960 by Emmet M. Walsh

Personal details
- Born: March 8, 1920 Youngstown, Ohio, USA
- Died: April 9, 2000 (aged 80) Youngstown
- Education: St. Mary's Seminary; Catholic University of America
- Motto: Sub tuum praesidium (Under your protection)

Ordination history of James William Malone
History
Episcopal consecration
- Consecrated by: Emmet M. Walsh
Episcopal succession
Bishops consecrated by James William Malone as principal consecrator
- William Anthony Hughes: September 12, 1974
- Benedict Charles Franzetta: September 4, 1980

James William Malone (March 8, 1920 – April 9, 2000) was an American prelate of the Roman Catholic Church. He served as bishop of the Diocese of Youngstown in Ohio from 1968 to 1995.

== Biography ==
=== Early life ===
James Malone was born in Youngstown, Ohio, on March 8, 1920. The son of a steelworker, Malone worked in a steel mill for a year to raise money for college. He attend St. Mary's Seminary in Wickliffe, Ohio. He later received a Doctor of School Administration degree from the Catholic University of America in Washington, D.C.

Malone was ordained a priest in Youngstown by Bishop James A. McFadden for the Diocese of Youngstown on May 26, 1945.

=== Auxiliary Bishop and Bishop of Youngstown ===
On January 2, 1960, Pope John XXIII named Malone as the titular bishop of Alabanda and auxiliary bishop of Youngstown. He was consecrated at Saint Columba Cathedral in Youngstown on March 24, 1960, by Bishop Emmet M. Walsh. His co-consecrators were Bishops Clarence Issenmann and John Krol. From 1962 to 1965, Malone attended all four sessions of the Second Vatican Council in Rome. He backed initiatives of the Council that included using vernacular language in mass and increasing roles in the church for the laity.

Pope Paul VI appointed Malone as the third bishop of Youngstown on May 2, 1968, following the death of Bishop Walsh. In 1972, Malone was diagnosed with stomach cancer, but was declared cancer-free after five years of treatment. After the closing of Youngstown Sheet and Tube in Youngstown in 1977, 5,000 people in the Youngstown area lost their jobs. Malone led an unsuccessful effort by clergy from different faiths to stop it.

Malone was a strong advocate of interfaith communication. He was elected as the first Catholic leader of the Ohio Council of Churches. He delivered sermons in Protestant churches and urged his priests to establish contacts with non-Catholic congregations. From 1983 to 1986, Malone served as the president of the National Conference of Catholic Bishops/United States Catholic Conference.

=== Retirement ===
On December 5, 1995, Pope John Paul II accepted Malone's resignation as bishop of Youngstown. In 1999, surgeons removed one of Malone's kidneys. In March 2000, he entered St. Elizabeth Hospital Medical Center in Youngstown, where his spleen was removed. James Malone died in Youngstown after surgery on April 9, 2000.

== See also ==
Catholic Church titles
Preceded by Emmet M. Walsh	Bishop of Youngstown; 1968—1995	Succeeded by Thomas J. Tobin
Preceded by John R. Roach	President of the NCCB/USCC; 1983—1986	Succeeded by John L. May
