= Herbert Bevard =

American Roman Catholic prelate (1946–2025)

His Excellency, The Most Reverend Herbert Armstrong Bevard
- Bishop of Saint Thomas
- Archdiocese: Washington
- Diocese: Saint Thomas
- Appointed: July 7, 2008
- Installed: September 3, 2008
- Retired: September 18, 2020
- Predecessor: George Murry
- Successor: Jerome Feudjio

Orders
- Ordination: May 20, 1972 by John Krol
- Consecration: September 3, 2008 by Donald Wuerl, Joseph Edward Kurtz, and Daniel Edward Thomas

Personal details
- Born: February 24, 1946 Baltimore, Maryland, U.S.
- Died: September 20, 2025 (aged 79) Wilmington, North Carolina, U.S.
- Denomination: Roman Catholic Church
- Education: St. Charles Borromeo Seminary
- Motto: Sub tuum praesidium (Beneath thy protection)

Styles of Herbert Armstrong Bevard
- Reference style: His Excellency; The Most Reverend
- Spoken style: Your Excellency
- Religious style: Bishop

Herbert Armstrong Bevard (February 24, 1946 – September 20, 2025) was an American prelate of the Roman Catholic Church who served as bishop of the Diocese of Saint Thomas in the United States Virgin Islands from 2008 until 2020.

== Biography ==
=== Early life ===
Herbert Bevard was born in Baltimore, Maryland, on February 24, 1946. He converted from Presbyterianism to Catholicism in 1964, when he was a high school senior. After deciding to become a priest, Bevard entered St. Charles Borromeo Seminary in Wynnewood, Pennsylvania.

He was ordained to the priesthood by Cardinal John Krol for the Archdiocese of Philadelphia at the Cathedral Basilica of Saints Peter and Paul in Philadelphia in 1972. Bevard was created as monsignor in 2003 and was stationed in Philadelphia as episcopal vicar for the city's northern half.

=== Bishop of Saint Thomas ===
Bevard was appointed bishop of Saint Thomas in the Virgin Islands on July 7, 2008, by Pope Benedict XVI. Bevard was consecrated on September 3, 2008, in Charlotte Amelie at the Cathedral of Saints Peter and Paul by Archbishop Donald Wuerl. The principal co-consecrators were Archbishop Joseph Kurtz and Bishop Daniel Edward Thomas.

He was instrumental in raising funds for the restoration of the Cathedral of Saints Peter and Paul. In trips to the Continental United States, he worked to raise money for schools and charities within the diocese. After the two hurricanes hit the Virgin Islands in 2017, Bevard allowed the conversion of a diocesan retreat center on St. Croix into a homeless shelter.

== Retirement and death ==
Pope Francis accepted Bevard's resignation on September 18, 2020, and appointed Archbishop Wilton Gregory of Washington to temporarily run the diocese as apostolic administrator. He died in Wilmington on September 20, 2025, at the age of 79.

Catholic Church titles
Preceded by George Murry	Bishop of Saint Thomas; 2008–2020	Succeeded by Jerome Feudjio
