= Elliot Griffin Thomas =

American Roman Catholic prelate (1926–2019)

His Excellency, The Most Reverend Elliot Griffin Thomas
- Bishop Emeritus of Saint Thomas
- Archdiocese: Washington
- Diocese: Saint Thomas
- Appointed: October 30, 1993
- Installed: December 12, 1993
- Term ended: June 29, 1999
- Predecessor: Seán Patrick O'Malley
- Successor: George V. Murry

Orders
- Ordination: June 6, 1986 by Seán Patrick O'Malley
- Consecration: December 12, 1993 by James Aloysius Hickey, Seán Patrick O'Malley, and Donald James Reece

Personal details
- Born: July 15, 1926 Pittsburgh, Pennsylvania, United States
- Died: February 28, 2019 (aged 92) Timonium, Maryland, United States
- Motto: Emitte spiritum tuum

Styles of Elliot Griffin Thomas
- Reference style: His Excellency; The Most Reverend
- Spoken style: Your Excellency
- Religious style: Bishop

Elliot Griffin Thomas (15 July 1926 – 28 February 2019) was an American Catholic prelate who served as Bishop of Saint Thomas from 1993 to 1999.

== Life ==
Thomas was born in Pittsburgh, Pennsylvania, on July 15, 1926. His family had lived in Tortola, British Virgin Islands, and returned there in 1934. Thomas was enrolled in the Methodist Day School in Road Town and as a teenager attended Charlotte Amalie High School, St. Thomas, where he graduated in 1945.

Following his graduation, Thomas served as a Clerk of the Municipal Homestead Commission and Clerk of the Adult Evening School in St. Thomas. In 1945, he enrolled in the College of Pharmacy at Howard University in Washington, D.C., where he earned a Bachelor of Science degree in 1950. After qualifying as a registered pharmacist in Detroit, Michigan, he joined the United States Army and was assigned to FranMort-Hoechst and to Munich. After returning to the Virgin Islands, he became a pharmacist in St. Thomas. From 1954 to 1959, Thomas worked as a pharmacist with the Veterans Administration in Erie, Pennsylvania, where he also studied part-time at Gannon College, majoring in Business Administration.

On October 2, 1957, Thomas converted to Catholicism and was received into the Catholic Church at St. Peter's Cathedral in Erie, Pennsylvania. He began his studies for the priesthood in 1982 at St. Vincent de Paul Regional Seminary in Boynton Beach, Florida. He was ordained to the priesthood for the Diocese of St. Thomas in the Virgin Islands on June 6, 1986, and was appointed Episcopal Vicar for the diocese and Pastor of Holy Family Church.

Thomas served as pastor of St. Ann's Church on St. Croix, pastor of Holy Family Church, Dean of the Diocese and the Vicar General. The Diocesan Consulters of the Diocese of St. Thomas unanimously elected Thomas to serve as Diocesan Administrator, a post he filled from August 11, 1992, until he was named as the Third Bishop of the Virgin Islands on October 30, 1993. He was consecrated and installed at the Cathedral of Saints Peter and Paul in Saint Thomas on December 12, 1993. Thomas resigned in June 1999.

== See also ==
- Catholic Church hierarchy
- Catholic Church in the United States
- Historical list of the Catholic bishops of the United States
- List of Catholic bishops of the United States
- Lists of patriarchs, archbishops, and bishops

== Episcopal succession ==
Catholic Church titles
Preceded by Seán Patrick O'Malley	Bishop of Saint Thomas; 1993-1999	Succeeded by George V. Murry
