= Jerome Feudjio =

Cameroon catholic priest (born 1955)

His Excellency, The Most Reverend Jerome Feudjio
- Bishop of Saint Thomas
- Diocese: Saint Thomas
- Appointed: March 2, 2021
- Installed: April 17, 2021
- Predecessor: Herbert Bevard

Orders
- Ordination: September 29, 1990 by Seán Patrick O'Malley
- Consecration: April 17, 2021 by Wilton Daniel Gregory, Seán Patrick O'Malley, and Donald Wuerl

Personal details
- Born: September 30, 1955 (age 71) Dschang, Cameroon
- Education: Major Seminary of Nkolbison; Washington Theological Consortium; Southern Illinois University
- Motto: Vivit Christus In Me (Christ lives in me)

Styles of Jerome Feudjio
- Reference style: His Excellency; The Most Reverend
- Spoken style: Your Excellency
- Religious style: Bishop

Jerome Feudjio (born September 30, 1955) is a Cameroonian-born prelate of the Catholic Church who has served as bishop of the Diocese of Saint Thomas in the United States Virgin Islands since 2021.

== Biography ==
=== Early life ===
Born on September 30, 1955, in Nkongsamba, Cameroon, Jerome Feudjio graduated in 1967 from St. Albert Catholic School in Dschang, Cameroon. In 1968, he started attending St. John College of the Christian Brothers of Quebec in Mbanga, Cameroon, receiving a degree in bookkeeping in 1972.

After graduating from college, Feudjio became a postulant for the Priests of the Sacred Heart. In 1972, he starting attending Saint Apostles Seminary of the Fathers of the Sacred Heart in Otelé, Cameroon. In 1975, Feudjio went to the Major Seminary of Nkolbison in Yaoundé, Cameroon, finishing there in 1979.

In 1980, while on a visit to Washington, D.C, Feudjio was introduced to Reverend Sean O'Malley. O'Malley invited him to remain in Washington and stay at San Francisco House, run by the Spanish Catholic Center of the Archdiocese of Washington. Feudjio attended Oblate College at Washington Theological Consortium, completing studies in philosophy and theology for the priesthood. In 1987, he joined the Oblates of Mary Immaculate and made his temporary religious profession.

Moving to Carbondale, Illinois, Feudjio enrolled in the Administration of Justice Program at Southern Illinois University. He completed the program with an internship at a local transitional house. In 1988, Feudjio started working as a campus minister at Sts. Peter & Paul School in St. Thomas.

=== Priesthood ===
On September 29, 1990, Feudjio was ordained to the priesthood for the Diocese of St. Thomas by O'Malley at Saints Peter and Paul Cathedral in St. Thomas. After his 1990 ordination, the diocese assigned Feudjio as parochial vicar at the cathedral parish and Saint Anne's Chapel in Frenchtown, Saint Thomas. In 1992, he started teaching French and religion at Sts. Peter & Paul School; in 1995, he became assistant principal there. In 1996, Feudjio became the diocesan finance officer and director of vocations. In 1997, he left both of his school positions to become administrator of Saints Peter & Paul Cathedral. In 2000, Feudjio became rector of the Cathedral and in 2001 vicar for clergy and religious.

In 2002, Feudjio became chancellor for the diocese for two years. In 2002, Pope John Paul II named Feudjio a chaplain of his holiness. in 2004, he was assigned as pastor of Holy Family Parish in St. Thomas. In 2008, he was named rector and vicar general of the Saints Peter and Paul Cathedral.

=== Bishop ===
On March 2, 2021, Pope Francis appointed Feudjio as bishop of Saint Thomas. On April 17, 2021, Feudjio was consecrated as bishop at Saints Peter and Paul Cathedral in St. Thomas, US Virgin Islands by Cardinal Wilton Gregory, with O'Malley and Cardinal Donald Wuerl serving as co-consecrators.

== See also ==
- Catholic Church hierarchy
- Catholic Church in the United States
- Historical list of the Catholic bishops of the United States
- List of Catholic bishops of the United States
- Lists of patriarchs, archbishops, and bishops

Catholic Church titles
Preceded by Herbert Bevard	Bishop of Saint Thomas; 2021-Present	Succeeded by Incumbent
