= Frank Ruggiero =

American civil servant

- Born: Youngstown, Ohio
- Education: Ursuline High School; American University; University of Virginia
- Occupation: Civil servant

Frank Ruggiero is an American civil servant. He served as the Principal Deputy Assistant Secretary (PDAS) in the Bureau of Political-Military Affairs (PM). He now serves as Senior Vice President of Government Relations at BAE Systems.

== Biography ==
=== Early life ===
Frank Ruggiero was born in Youngstown, Ohio. He graduated from Ursuline High School in 1982. He then received a bachelor's degree in political science from Ohio State University. He has an M.A. in Middle Eastern Affairs from American University and has completed all requirements for a Ph.D. (but the dissertation) in U.S. Foreign Policy in Asia from the University of Virginia.

=== Career ===
A career civil servant, he has served in several positions in the United States Department of State and the United States Department of Commerce.

He played a leading role in the negotiation of Defense Trade Treaties with the United Kingdom and Australia and initiated a series of defense trade reforms under National Security Presidential Directive 56. He has played a leading role in the Department on U.S. security strategy in the Persian Gulf and on political-military issues in the Middle East. He has served as DAS in the PM Bureau since January 2007.

He served as Acting Assistant Secretary for Political-Military Affairs from January 2009 to June 2009. In the fall of 2010, he was asked by his boss, Richard Holbrooke, to meet Syed Tayyab Agha, a liaison for the Taliban who had worked for Mohammed Omar, at a secret meeting in Germany alongside Jeff W. Hayes, a staff member of the United States National Security Council. The six-hour discussion focused on the release of Talibans from the Guantanamo Bay detention camp in exchange for the release of U.S. Army Sergeant Bowe Bergahl.

In December 2010, he replaced Holbrooke as the acting special representative to Afghanistan and Pakistan. As the Bureau's second-ranking official, he served as Acting Assistant Secretary in the absence of the Assistant Secretary and manages directly the Directorate of Defense Trade Controls and the Office of Regional Security and Arms Transfers.

He now serves as Senior Vice President of Government Relations at BAE Systems.
