= Donald D'Alesio =

American football coach (born 1991)

Donald D’Alesio
New York Giants
- Title: Secondary coach & Defensive pass game coordinator

Personal information
- Born: June 6, 1991 (age 35); Youngstown, Ohio, U.S.

Career information
- Position: Safety
- High school: Cardinal Mooney (Youngstown)
- College: Youngstown State (2010–2014)

Career history
- Youngstown State (2015) Defensive quality control coach; Youngstown State (2016–2017) Defensive line coach; Youngstown State (2018) Co-defensive coordinator & defensive line coach; Youngstown State (2019) Defensive coordinator; LSU (2020) Defensive analyst; Kansas City Chiefs (2021) Defensive assistant; Kansas City Chiefs (2022–2024) Safeties coach; Baltimore Ravens (2025) Defensive backs coach; New York Giants (2026–present) Secondaries coach & defensive pass game coordinator

Awards and highlights
- 2× Super Bowl champion (LVII, LVIII)

Donald D’Alesio (born June 6, 1991) is an American professional football secondaries coach & defensive pass game coordinator for the New York Giants. D'Alesio recently served as the secondary coach for the Baltimore Ravens of the National Football League (NFL) in 2025. D'Alesio was also previously the safeties coach with the Kansas City Chiefs, where he helped them win two Super Bowls.

== Personal life ==
Donald D'Alesio was born June 6, 1991, in Youngstown, Ohio. D'Alesio attended Cardinal Mooney High School, playing football there and winning a state championship in 2009.

== College career ==
D'Alesio attended Youngstown State University and played free safety and earned a degree in business.

In his freshman year, D'Alesio played in all eleven games, and made seven starts. He finished the year with 69 total tackles. In his sophomore year, he started three total games before a shoulder injury sidelined him for the rest of his sophomore year. He made his returned to football the next year in 2012, where he again started all eleven games, racking up 38 total tackles and one interception, which was a game saver against Northern Iowa.

D'Alesio finished his career with 48 total starts, 247 total tackles and four interceptions.

== Coaching career ==
=== Youngstown State ===
He spent his first coaching year at his alma mater as a defensive quality control coach, primarily working with the defensive line. He then was then the defensive line coach from 2016 to 2017, coaching multiple future NFL players, such as Derek Rivers and Avery Moss. In 2018, he was promoted to co-defensive coordinator while still coaching the defensive line. He was promoted to defensive coordinator in 2019.

=== LSU ===
D'Alesio spent the 2020 season at Louisiana State University as a defensive analyst.

=== Kansas City Chiefs ===
D'Alesio was hired by the Kansas City Chiefs as a defensive assistant on April 2, 2021.

On February 22, 2022, Chiefs head coach Andy Reid announced that D'Alesio had been promoted to safeties coach. He won Super Bowl LVII in his first season as safeties coach.

He also won Super Bowl LVIII the next season as safeties coach.

=== Baltimore Ravens ===
On February 15, 2025, the Ravens hired D'Alesio as their defensive backs coach, replacing Doug Mallory. The Ravens did not bring back D'Alesio following the 2025 season, as the Ravens hired Mike Mickens in February 2026.

=== New York Giants ===
On January 31, 2026, the New York Giants hired D'Alesio as their new secondary coach and defensive pass game coordinator under newly hired head coach John Harbaugh.
