= Sts. Peter & Paul School =

Sts. Peter & Paul Catholic School
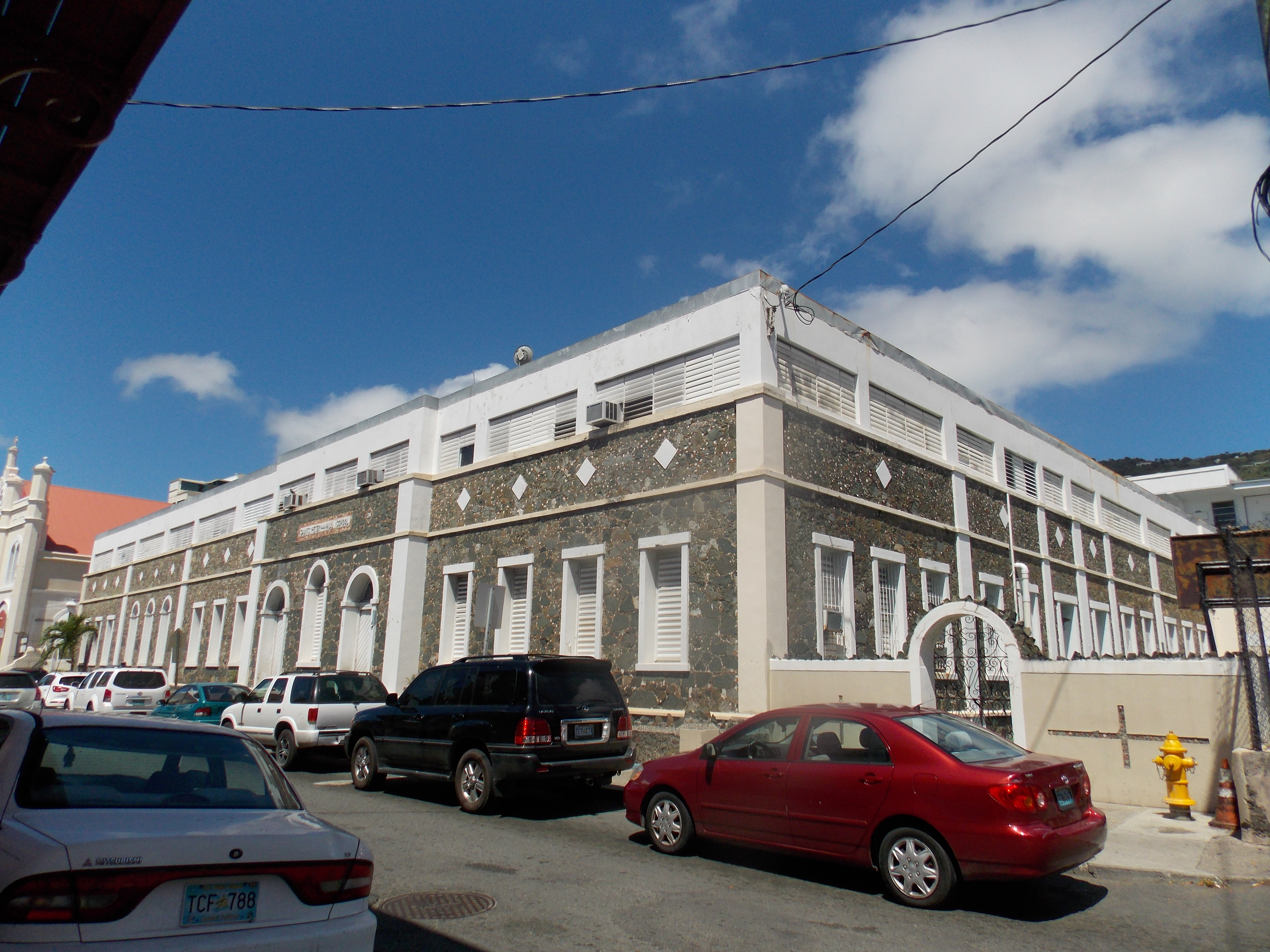

Location
- 13-19 Kronprindsens Gade; St. Thomas 00803; United States; 18°20′37″N 64°55′53″W

Information
- Type: Private coeducational
- Religious affiliation: Catholic
- Established: 1924 (elementary); 1946 (high school)
- Principal: Rev. Eduardo Ortiz-Santiago
- Grades: PK–12
- Campus size: Less than 300
- Colors: Red & White
- Slogan: None
- Song: None
- Fight song: None
- Mascot: Jaguars
- Accreditation: Middle States Association of Colleges and Schools
- Tuition: $400-800
- Website: https://saintpps.com/

Sts. Peter & Paul School is a private Roman Catholic high school in St. Thomas, United States Virgin Islands. It is located within the Diocese of St. Thomas and is the only Catholic high school on St. Thomas.

== Background ==
Saints Peter & Paul School was established in 1924 as an elementary school. The high school program began in 1946 with its first class graduating in 1950. It serves children from pre-kindergarten through grade 12.
