= Benedict Charles Franzetta =

Most Reverend Benedict C. Franzetta
- Auxiliary Bishop of Youngstown
- Church: Catholic Church
- See: Titular See of Opitergium
- In office: September 4, 1980 - September 4, 1996

Orders
- Ordination: April 29, 1950
- Consecration: September 4, 1980 by James William Malone

Personal details
- Born: August 1, 1921 East Liverpool, Ohio
- Died: September 26, 2006 (aged 85) Youngstown, Ohio

Benedict Charles Franzetta (August 1, 1921 - September 26, 2006) was an American Bishop of the Catholic Church. He served as auxiliary bishop of the Diocese of Youngstown from 1980 to 1996.

== Biography ==
Born in East Liverpool, Ohio, Benedict Franzetta was ordained a priest for the Diocese of Youngstown on April 29, 1950. On March 14, 1984 Pope John Paul II appointed him as the Titular Bishop of Opitergium and Auxiliary Bishop of Youngstown. He was ordained a bishop by Bishop James Malone on September 4, 1980. The principal co-consecrators were Archbishop Joseph Bernardin of Cincinnati and Bishop William Hughes of Covington. He continued to serve as an auxiliary bishop until his resignation was accepted by Pope John Paul II on September 4, 1996. He died on September 26, 2006, at the age of 85.
