= Emmet M. Walsh =

American prelate

His Excellency, The Most Reverend Emmet Michael Walsh
- Bishop of Youngstown; Titular Bishop of Rhaedestus
- Church: Roman Catholic Church
- See: Youngstown
- In office: November 16, 1952— March 16, 1968
- Predecessor: James A. McFadden
- Successor: James W. Malone
- Previous posts: Bishop of Charleston (1927-1949); Coadjutor Bishop of Youngstown (1949-1952)

Orders
- Ordination: January 15, 1916 by Benjamin Joseph Keiley
- Consecration: September 8, 1927 by Michael Joseph Keyes

Personal details
- Born: March 6, 1892 Beaufort, South Carolina, USA
- Died: March 16, 1968 (aged 76) Youngstown, Ohio, USA
- Education: St. Bernard's Seminary
- Motto: Christus rex nostra (Christ our king)

Emmet Michael Walsh (March 6, 1892 – March 16, 1968) was an American prelate of the Roman Catholic Church. He served as bishop of the Diocese of Charleston in South Carolina (1927–1949) and as bishop of the Diocese of Youngstown in Ohio (1952–1968).

== Biography ==
=== Early life ===
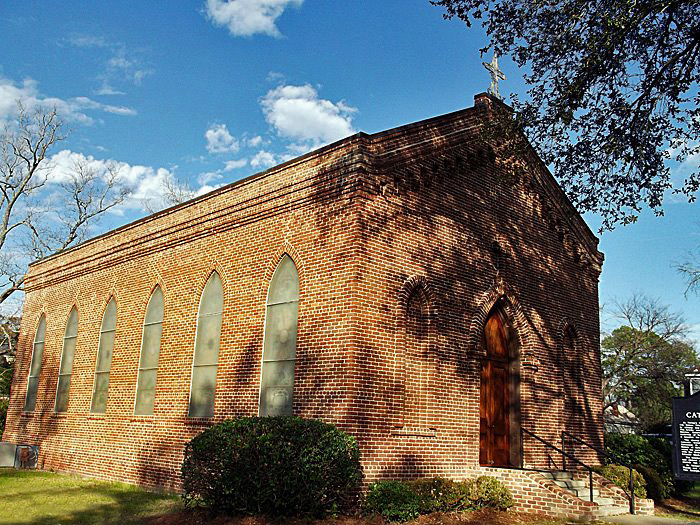
Old St. Teresa's Catholic Church, Albany, Georgia (2014)

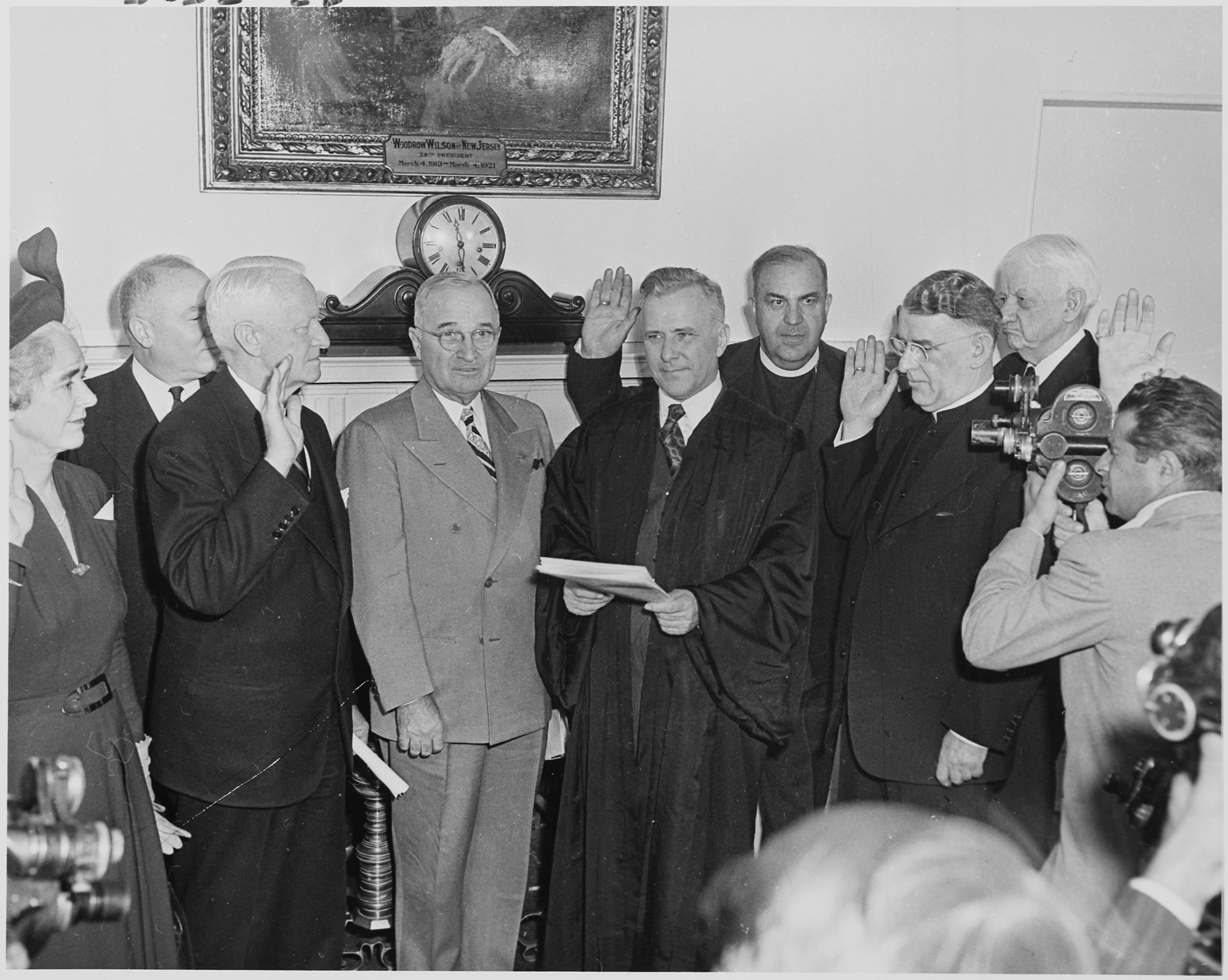
Bishop Walsh with President Truman, 1951 (7th from left)

The eighth of eleven children, Emmet Walsh was born on March 6, 1892, in Beaufort, South Carolina, to Thomas and Wilhelmenia (née Jennemann) Walsh. In 1906, his family moved to Savannah, Georgia. After graduating from Savannah High School in 1910, he studied for the priesthood at St. Bernard's Seminary in Rochester, New York.

=== Priesthood ===
Walsh was ordained a priest in Savannah for the Diocese of Savannah by Bishop Benjamin Keiley on January 15, 1916. After his ordination, Walsh served as a curate at the Immaculate Conception Parish in Atlanta, Georgia, until 1917, when he became pastor of St. Teresa's Parish in Albany, Georgia. He was also charged with the missions in Southwest Georgia, giving him a jurisdiction of 1,000 Catholics over 16,000 square miles.

Walsh was named pastor of St. Patrick's Parish in Savannah in 1921, then returned to Immaculate Conception Parish to serve as a pastor in 1923.

=== Bishop of Charleston ===
On June 20, 1927, Walsh was appointed the sixth bishop of Charleston by Pope Pius XI. He received his episcopal consecration on September 8, 1927, from Bishop Michael Keyes, with Bishops Patrick Barry and William Hafey serving as co-consecrators, at the Cathedral of St. John the Baptist in Savannah. At age 35, Walsh was then the youngest American bishop.

During his 22-year tenure in Charleston, Walsh erected 25 churches, four hospitals, and two vacation camps for youth. He also served as chair of the National Catholic Welfare Conference's Legal Department and secretary of the Bishops' Meeting at the Catholic University of America in Washington, D.C.

=== Bishop of Youngstown ===
Pope Pius XII named Walsh as coadjutor bishop of Youngstown and titular bishop of Rhaedestus on September 8, 1949. In 1951, U.S. President Harry S. Truman appointed Walsh to the Internal Security and Individual Rights Commission, formed by the federal government to investigate subversive activities.

Walsh automatically succeeded Bishop James A. McFadden on November 16, 1952. During his tenure, the diocese experienced a period of great growth. The Vatican elevated Walsh to the rank of assistant at the pontifical throne in 1954. He attended the Second Vatican Council in Rome from 1962 to 1965.

=== Death ===
Emmet Walsh died on March 16, 1968, in Youngstown, Ohio, at age 76.

Catholic Church titles
| Preceded by William Thomas Russell | Bishop of Charleston; 1927–1949 | Succeeded by John Joyce Russell |
| Preceded by James A. McFadden | Bishop of Youngstown; 1952–1968 | Succeeded by James W. Malone |
