= James A. McFadden =

American prelate

His Excellency, The Most Reverend James Augustine McFadden
- Bishop of Youngstown; Titular Bishop of Bida
- See: Diocese of Youngstown
- In office: September 8, 1932
- Successor: Emmet M. Walsh
- Previous post: Auxiliary Bishop of Cleveland (1932-1943)

Orders
- Ordination: June 17, 1905 by Ignatius Frederick Horstmann
- Consecration: September 8, 1932 by Joseph Schrembs

Personal details
- Born: December 4, 1880 Cleveland, Ohio, US
- Died: November 16, 1952 (aged 71) Youngstown, Ohio, US
- Denomination: Roman Catholic
- Education: John Carroll University; St. Mary's Seminary
- Motto: In omnibus caritas (Love in all things)

James Augustine McFadden (December 24, 1880 – November 16, 1952) was an American prelate of the Roman Catholic Church. He served as the first bishop of the Diocese of Youngstown in Ohio (1943–1952). He previously served as an auxiliary bishop of the Diocese of Cleveland in Ohio (1932-1943).

== Biography ==
=== Early life ===
James McFadden was born on December 4, 1880, in Cleveland, Ohio, to Edward and Mary (née Cavanagh) McFadden. He went to Cathedral and Holy Name grade schools, then attended St. Ignatius High School in Cleveland. After his graduation, McFadden entered John Carroll University in University Heights, Ohio. After finishing college, he started his preparation for the priesthood at St. Mary's Seminary in Wickliffe, Ohio.

=== Priesthood ===
McFadden was ordained to the priesthood in Cleveland for the Diocese of Cleveland by Bishop Ignatius Horstmann on June 17, 1905. After his ordination, McFadden served as a curate at St. Agnes Parish in Cleveland. In 1914, he founded and became the first pastor of St. Agnes Parish in Elyria, Ohio. From 1917 to 1923, McFadden served as rector of St. Mary's Seminary. He also served as diocesan director of the Society for the Propagation of the Faith (1923-1927) and as chancellor of the diocese (1925-1943). He was named a domestic prelate in 1927.

=== Auxiliary Bishop of Cleveland ===
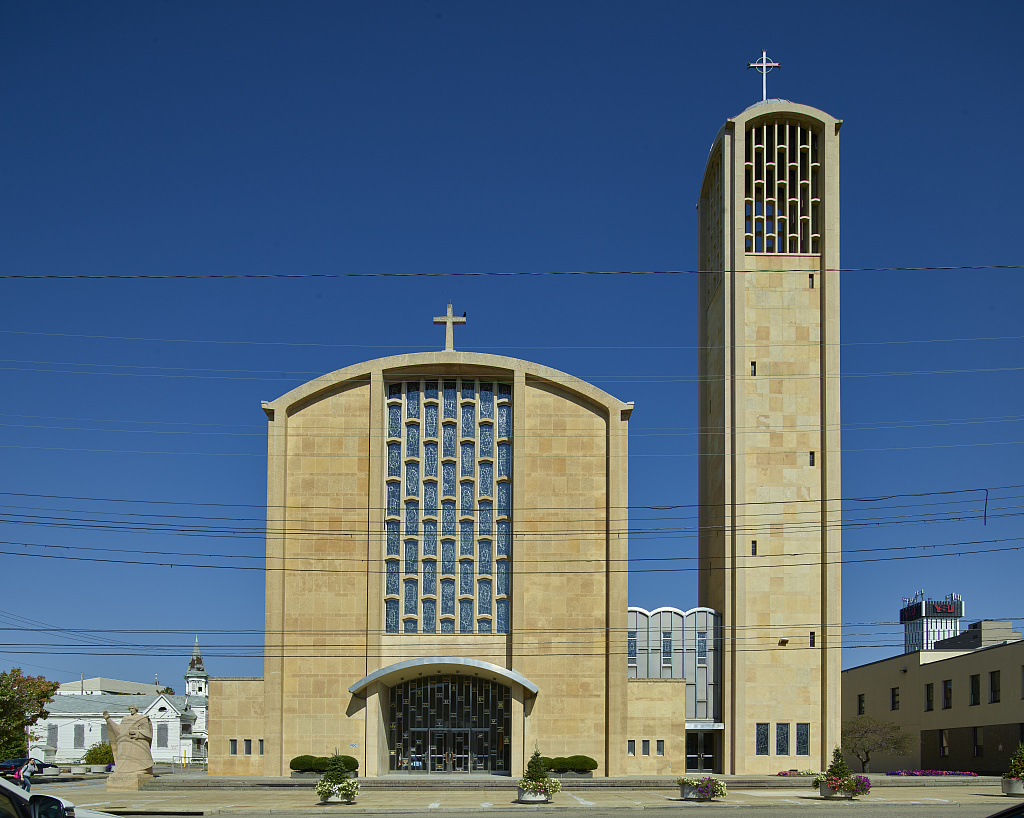
St. Columba Cathedral, Youngstown, Ohio (2016)

On May 12, 1932, McFadden was appointed as an auxiliary bishop of Cleveland and titular bishop of Bida by Pope Pius XI. He received his episcopal consecration at the Cathedral of Saint John the Evangelist in Cleveland on September 8, 1932, from Bishop Joseph Schrembs, with Bishops Michael Gallagher and Thomas O'Reilly serving as co-consecrators. In 1933, McFadden attended an interfaith rally in Cleveland to protest the persecution of Jews in Germany under the Nazi regime.

=== Bishop of Youngstown ===
McFadden was named the first bishop of the new Diocese of Youngstown by Pope Pius XII on June 2, 1943. McFadden designated St. Columba Church in Youngstown as the new cathedral of the diocese. The diocese then contained 110 churches, three hospitals run by religious orders, 54 parochial elementary schools, one parochial junior high school, and three Catholic high schools. In 1949, McFadden requested the appointment of a coadjutor bishop to assist him in his work; the pope appointed Bishop Emmet Walsh for the position.

James McFadden died in Youngstown on November 16, 1951, at age 71.

Catholic Church titles
Preceded by none	Bishop of Youngstown; 1943—1952	Succeeded by Emmet M. Walsh
