= George V. Murry =

American Catholic bishop (1948–2020)

His Excellency, The Most Reverend George V. Murry SJ
- Bishop of Youngstown
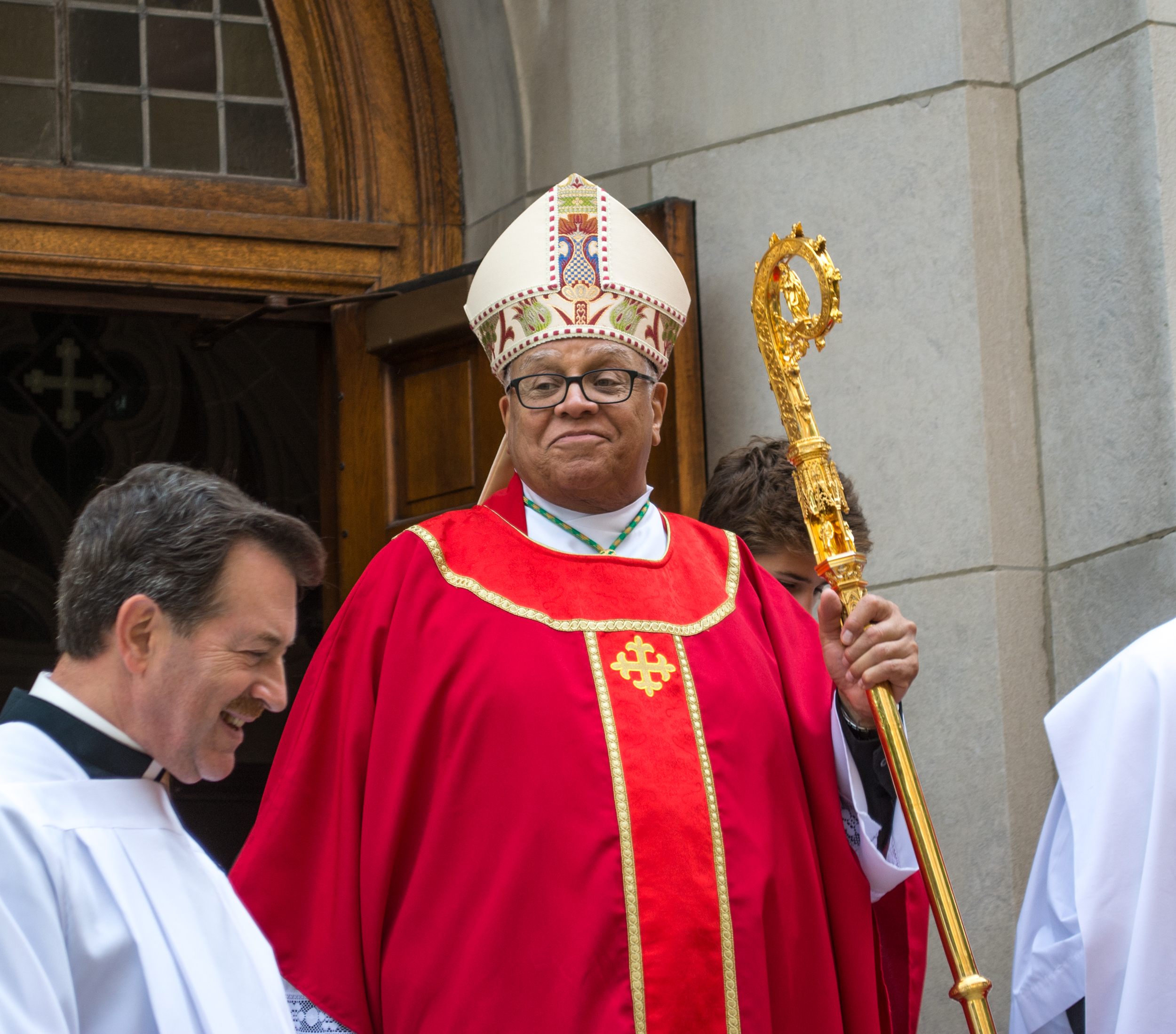
- Bishop Murry in September 2018
- Church: Catholic
- Diocese: Diocese of Youngstown
- Appointed: January 30, 2007
- Installed: March 28, 2007
- Term ended: May 26, 2020
- Predecessor: Thomas J. Tobin
- Successor: David Bonnar
- Previous posts: Bishop of Saint Thomas (1999–2007); Coadjutor Bishop of Saint Thomas (1998–1999); Auxiliary Bishop of Chicago & Titular Bishop of Fuerteventura (1995–1998)

Orders
- Ordination: June 9, 1979 by William Donald Borders
- Consecration: March 20, 1995 by Joseph Bernardin, Alfred Leo Abramowicz, and Timothy Joseph Lyne

Personal details
- Born: December 28, 1948 Camden, New Jersey, USA
- Died: June 5, 2020 (aged 71) New York, New York, USA
- Education: Jesuit School of Theology of Santa Clara University; George Washington University
- Motto: Christ my light
- Styles
- Reference style: His Excellency; The Most Reverend
- Spoken style: Your Excellency
- Religious style: Bishop

George Vance Murry III (December 28, 1948 – June 5, 2020) was an American Catholic prelate and member of the Society of Jesus who served as the Bishop of Youngstown from 2007 to 2020.

Murry previously served as an auxiliary bishop for the Archdiocese of Chicago from 1995 to 1998 and as Bishop of Saint Thomas from 1998 to 2007. He submitted his resignation from Youngstown in May 2020 after suffering a relapse of leukemia, but died before it was accepted.

== Biography ==
=== Early life ===
George Vance Murry III was born in Camden, New Jersey, on December 28, 1948, to Viola Murry and George Vance Murry II. He originally belonged to the African Methodist Episcopal Church but converted to Catholicism when he was a child while attending a parochial school in Baltimore, Maryland. He later graduated from Camden Catholic High School in Camden, New Jersey.

Murry attended St. Joseph's College in Philadelphia, St. Thomas Seminary in Bloomfield, Connecticut, and St. Mary's Seminary in Baltimore, obtaining a Bachelor of Philosophy degree in 1972. In that same year, he was admitted as a member of the Society of Jesus. After completing his period of novitiate in 1974, Murry obtained a Master of Divinity degree from the Jesuit School of Theology at Berkeley in Berkeley, California, and a Masters and Doctorate in American Cultural History from George Washington University in Washington, D.C.

=== Priesthood ===
On June 9, 1979, Murry was ordained to the priesthood for the Society of Jesus at the chapel of Loyola College in Baltimore by Archbishop William Donald Borders

Murry became an assistant professor of American studies at Georgetown University in 1986, and taught at that institution for four years. He also served as president of Archbishop Carroll High School in Washington, D.C. from 1989 until 1994, when he was appointed associate vice president for academic affairs at the University of Detroit Mercy.

=== Auxiliary Bishop of Chicago ===
Pope John Paul II appointed Murry as an auxiliary bishop of Chicago and titular bishop of Fuerteventura on January 24, 1995. He was consecrated at Holy Name Cathedral in Chicago, Illinois, on March 20, 1995. Cardinal Joseph Bernardin served as the principal consecrator, assisted by Auxiliary Bishops Alfred Abramowicz and Timothy Lyne.

=== Coadjutor Bishop and Bishop of Saint Thomas ===
Murry was appointed coadjutor bishop of Saint Thomas by John Paul II on May 5, 1998. As such, he had the right of succession when the current bishop resigned. Murry became bishop of Saint Thomas on June 30, 1999, after the resignation of Bishop Elliot Thomas.

=== Bishop of Youngstown ===
On January 30, 2007, Pope Benedict XVI appointed Murry as the fifth bishop of Youngstown. Later in 2007, he was elected secretary of the United States Conference of Catholic Bishops (USCCB). Murry was re-elected to a three-year term as secretary in 2008. Murry served as chair of the USCCB Committee on Domestic Policy. He was appointed chair of the National Catholic Educational Association in 2015, serving until the end of 2017.

In September 2015, Pope Francis appointed Murry to the Synod of Bishops that met in October 2015 to discuss family life. At that meeting, he said he supported the view that church could change its practice toward the divorced and remarried without altering doctrine. Murry said he supported greater participation from theologians, cultural historians, and other experts, and that the Synod needed to find a way to hear the voices of the people who were the subject of its discussions. He also supported the creation of commission to consider allowing women to serve as deacons. He said: "It would be a wise idea to look into it, to learn more about it and then to present a proposal to the Pope to say there either are theological problems, or not. And if not, let’s move forward."

Murry served on several boards of directors and trustees:

- University of Detroit Mercy
- St. Joseph's University in Philadelphia
- Mount St. Mary's College
- Loyola Academy in Detroit
- Catholic Relief Services
- Loyola University Chicago
- Fairfield University in Fairfield, Connecticut

In 2017, Murry was appointed the founding chairman of the USCCB's Ad Hoc Committee Against Racism, a role in which he remained until the next year. In April 2018, Murry was diagnosed with acute myeloid leukemia. He received chemotherapy treatment at the Cleveland Clinic in Cleveland, Ohio. In September 2018, he returned to work part-time at the diocese. After being in remission, Murry suffered a relapse in April 2020.

=== Retirement and legacy ===
Murry submitted his resignation as bishop of Youngstown to Pope Francis on May 26, 2020, four years before the mandatory retirement age of 75. George Murry died on June 5, 2020, a few days after being admitted to Memorial Sloan Kettering Cancer Center in New York City for treatment.

== See also ==
- Catholic Church hierarchy
- Catholic Church in the United States
- Historical list of the Catholic bishops of the United States
- List of Catholic bishops of the United States
- Lists of patriarchs, archbishops, and bishops

Catholic Church titles
Preceded by Thomas J. Tobin	Bishop of Youngstown; 2007–2020	Succeeded by David Bonnar
Preceded by Elliot Griffin Thomas	Bishop of St. Thomas; 1999–2007	Succeeded by Herbert Bevard
Preceded by -	Auxiliary Bishop of Chicago; 1995–1998	Succeeded by -
