= Diocese of Saint Thomas =

Latin Catholic jurisdiction in the Caribbean

Coordinates: 18°20′28″N 64°56′12″W

Diocese of Saint Thomas in the Virgin Islands Diœcesis Sancti Thomae in Insulis Virgineis
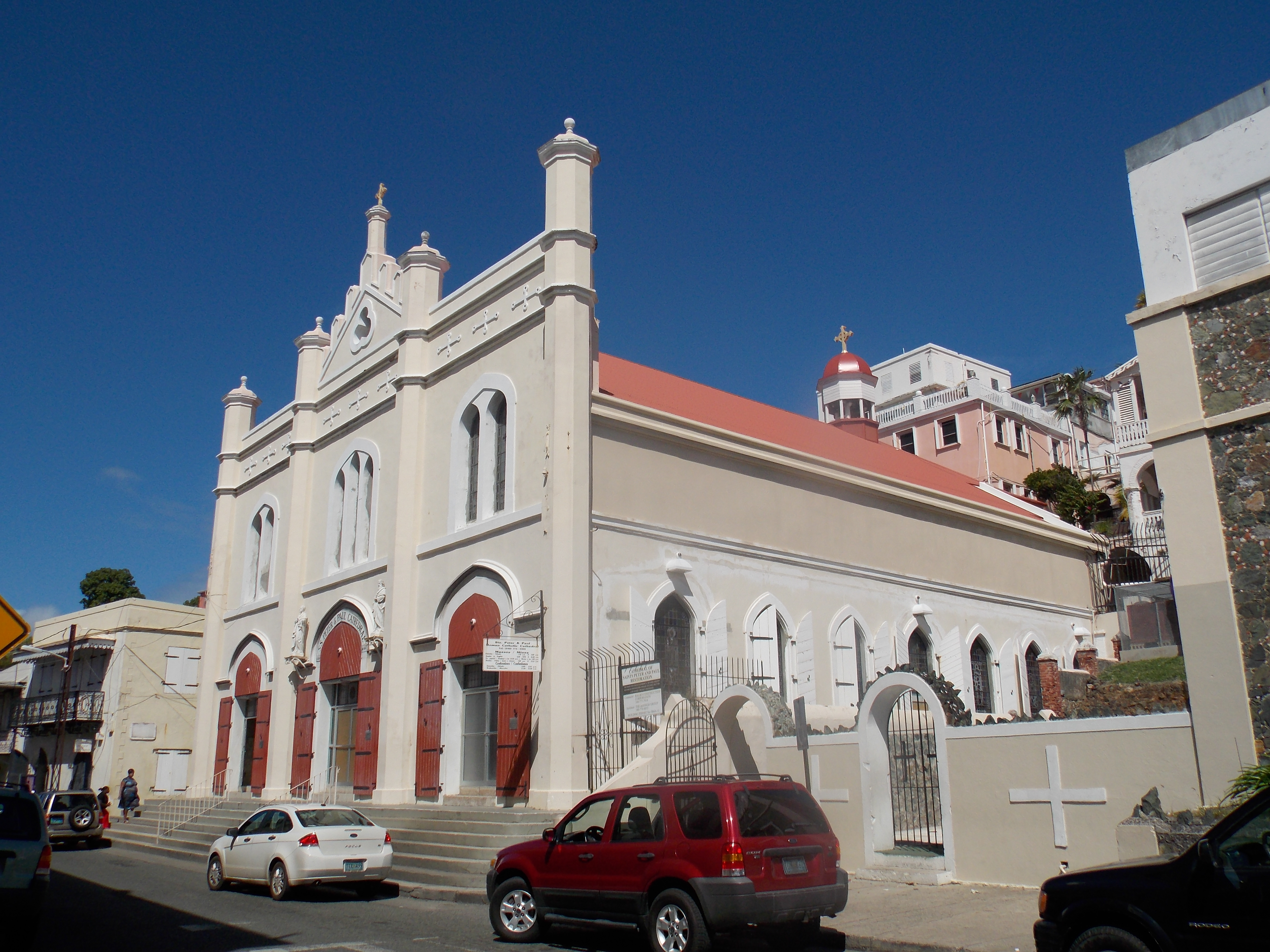
- Saints Peter and Paul Cathedral

- Coat of arms

Location
- Country: United States
- Territory: Saint Thomas, Saint Croix and Saint John in the United States Virgin Islands
- Ecclesiastical province: Washington

Statistics
- Area: 135 km^{2} (52 sq mi)
- Population: Total; Catholics: (as of 2010); 108,612; 30,000 (27.6%)
- Parishes: 8

Information
- Denomination: Catholic Church
- Sui iuris church: Latin Church
- Rite: Roman Rite
- Established: April 30, 1960 (66 years ago)
- Cathedral: Cathedral of Saints Peter and Paul
- Patron saint: Saints Peter and Paul

Current leadership
- Pope: Leo XIV
- Bishop: Jerome Feudjio
- Metropolitan Archbishop: Robert McElroy
- Vicar General: Andrea Filippucci

Map
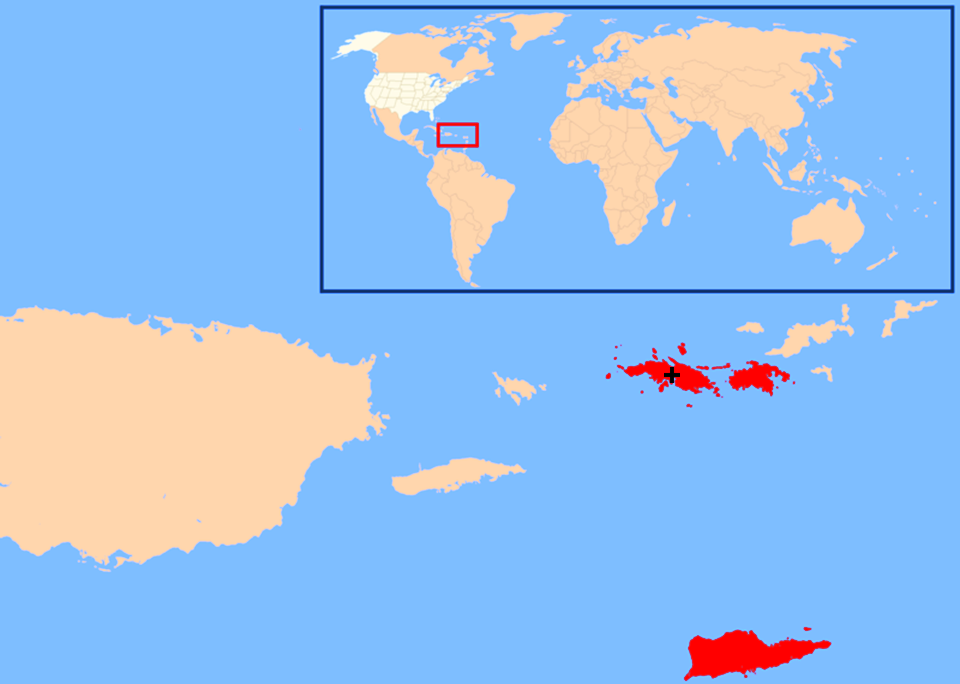
- The U.S. Virgin Islands of Saint Thomas, Saint Croix and Saint John

Website
- catholicvi.com

The Diocese of Saint Thomas in the Virgin Islands (Latin: Diœcesis Sancti Thomae in Insulis Virgineis) is a diocese of the Catholic Church for the U.S. Virgin Islands. It is the only suffragan diocese of the metropolitan Archdiocese of Washington. The mother church is Saints Peter and Paul Cathedral in St. Thomas. The bishop is Jerome Feudjio.

== History ==
=== 1700 to 1960 ===
By 1733, the present day US and British Virgin Islands were a colony of the Kingdom of Denmark, but were under the Catholic jurisdiction of the Diocese of San Juan in Puerto Rico, then a Spanish colony. The first Catholic church in the Virgin Islands was Holy Cross Catholic Church in Christiansted on the island of St. Croix, opening in 1755. On the island of St. Thomas, the first Catholic building opened in 1802 in Charlotte Amalie.

The Vatican in 1804 asked Bishop John Carroll from the Diocese of Baltimore in the United States to send priests to the Virgin Islands. These priests tended to Spanish merchants and French planters living there. The current Saints Peter and Paul church in Charlotte Amalie was constructed in 1848. In 1917, during World War I, the Government of Denmark sold St. Croix, St. John and St. Thomas to the United States. They became the US Virgin Islands.

=== 1960 to 1993 ===
Pope Paul VI erected the Territorial Prelature of the Virgin Islands in 1960, taking the Virgin Islands from the Diocese of San Juan de Puerto Rico. He named Edward Harper as the apostolic prefect. In 1977, Paul VI elevated the prefecture to the Diocese of Saint Thomas in the Virgin Islands. Harper was its first bishop.

Pope John Paul II in 1984 appointed Seán Patrick O'Malley from Washington as coadjutor bishop in St. Thomas to assist Harper. After 25 years of service, Harper retired in 1985. O'Malley succeeded him. While bishop, O'Malley worked with the homeless and opened a home for people with HIV/AIDS. In 1992, he was named bishop of the Diocese of Fall River.

=== 1993 to present ===
The next bishop of St. Thomas was Elliot Thomas of St. Thomas, taking office in 1993. Auxiliary Bishop George V. Murry from the Archdiocese of Chicago was appointed coadjutor bishop by John Paul II in 1998. When Thomas retired in 1999, Murry replaced him. Murry transferred to the Diocese of Youngstown in 2007.

To replace Murry, Benedict XVI named Monsignor Herbert Bevard from the Archdiocese of Philadelphia in 2008. In the aftermath of Hurricane Irma and Hurricane Maria in 2017, Catholic Charities opened five soup kitchens in the Virgin Islands to aid storm victims.

A health emergency forced Bevard to retire as bishop in 2020. Jerome Feudjio of St. Thomas succeeded him in 2021.

As of 2025, Feudjio is the current bishop of St. Thomas in the Virgin Islands.

== Bishops ==
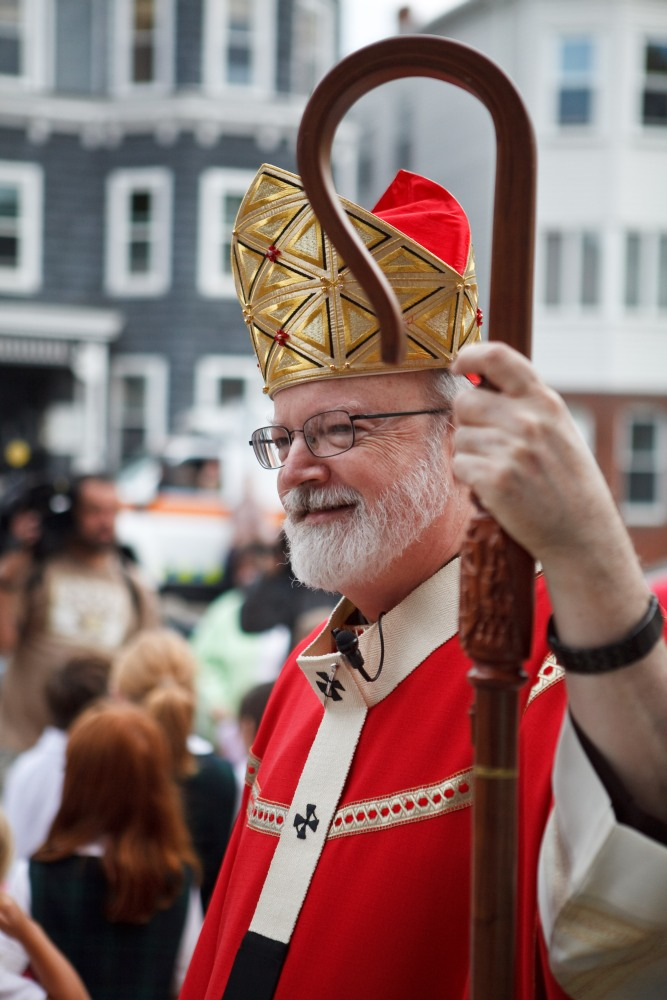
Cardinal O'Malley (2009)

=== Apostolic Prefect of the Virgin Islands ===
Edward John Harper (1960–1977)

=== Bishops of Saint Thomas ===
1. Edward John Harper (1977–1985)
2. Seán Patrick O'Malley (1985–1992), appointed Bishop of Fall River and later Bishop of Palm Beach, Archbishop of Boston, and President of the Pontifical Commission for the Protection of Minors (elevated to cardinal in 2006)
3. Elliot Griffin Thomas (1993–1999)
4. George Murry (1999–2007), appointed Bishop of Youngstown
5. Herbert Bevard (2008–2020)
6. Jerome Feudjio (2021–present)

=== Coadjutor Bishops ===
- Seán Patrick O'Malley (1984–1985)
- George Murry (1998–1999)

=== Another diocesan priest who became bishop ===
Adalberto Martínez Flores (priest here, 1985–1993), appointed Auxiliary Bishop of Asunción, Paraguay in 1997

== Parishes ==
As of 2026, the Diocese of St. Thomas had nine parishes.

== Schools ==
As of 2026, the Diocese of St. Thomas had four schools.
