= David Bonnar =

American priest (born 1962)

His Excellency, The Most Reverend David J. Bonnar
- Bishop of Youngstown
- Church: Catholic Church
- Diocese: Youngstown
- Appointed: November 17, 2020
- Installed: January 12, 2021
- Predecessor: George V. Murry

Orders
- Ordination: July 23, 1988 by Donald Wuerl
- Consecration: January 12, 2021 by Dennis Marion Schnurr

Personal details
- Born: February 5, 1962 (age 64) Pittsburgh, Pennsylvania
- Denomination: Roman Catholicism
- Education: Duquesne University; Pontifical North American College
- Motto: That all may be one

Ordination history of David Bonnar
History
Diaconal ordination
- Date: April 14, 1988
- Place: St. Peter's Basilica, Vatican City
Priestly ordination
- Date: July 23, 1988
- Place: Church of Saint Gabriel of the Sorrowful Virgin, Whitehall, Allegheny County, Pennsylvania
Episcopal consecration
- Principal consecrator: Dennis Marion Schnurr
- Co-consecrators: Paul J. Bradley; David Zubik
- Date: January 12, 2021
- Place: St. Columba Cathedral, Youngstown, Ohio

David Joseph Bonnar (born February 5, 1962) is an American Catholic prelate who has served as bishop of Youngstown in Ohio since 2020. He was previously editor of The Priest magazine and chaplain of the Pittsburgh Steelers.

== Early life ==
David Bonnar was born in Pittsburgh, Pennsylvania, on February 5, 1962. His father worked as a butcher, while his mother was a housewife; he was the fourth of five children. He studied at Duquesne University in Pittsburgh, obtaining a Bachelor of Arts degree in social communications in 1984. Starting in 1984, he attended seminary at the Pontifical North American College in Rome. He went on to obtain a Bachelor of Sacred Theology from the Pontifical Gregorian University in Rome. On April 14, 1988, Bonnar was ordained to the diaconate at St. Peter's Basilica in Rome.

== Priestly ministry ==
On July 23, 1988, Bonnar was ordained to the priesthood at the Church of Saint Gabriel of the Sorrowful Virgin, his home parish in Whitehall, Pennsylvania, by Cardinal Donald Wuerl.

Bonnar's first pastoral assignment was as parochial vicar of St. Vitus Parish in New Castle, Pennsylvania. He was then transferred to St. Rosalia Parish in Greenfield, Pennsylvania, four years later. He served as parish vicar of St. Thomas More Parish in Bethel Park, Pennsylvania, in 1996, before becoming director of vocations, rector of Saint Paul Seminary in Pittsburgh and director of the office for permanent deacons the following year. Bonnar was appointed as pastor at St. Bernard Parish in Mt. Lebanon, Pennsylvania, in 2009, serving there for 11 years. In July 2020, he was appointed the founding pastor of the new St. Aidan Parish in Wexford, Pennsylvania.

A spokesman for the diocese and fellow priest noted in 2020 how Bonnar "has shown himself to be a wonderful spiritual leader and a very competent administrator". Bonnar went into self-quarantine at the end of March 2020. This was a precautionary measure after one priest in Pittsburgh tested positive for the COVID-19 virus, while another developed mild symptoms. In addition to his duties as a parish priest, Bonnar served as the editor of The Priest magazine, a position he took in 2014. He also worked as the chaplain of the Pittsburgh Steelers football team.

== Episcopal ministry ==
Bonnar was appointed bishop of Youngstown by Pope Francis on November 17, 2020. He received his episcopal consecration from Archbishop Dennis Schnurr on January 12, 2021, at St. Columba Cathedral in Youngstown.

== See also ==
- Catholic Church hierarchy
- Catholic Church in the United States
- Historical list of the Catholic bishops of the United States
- List of Catholic bishops of the United States
- Lists of patriarchs, archbishops, and bishops

Catholic Church titles
Preceded by George V. Murry	Bishop of Youngstown; 2021–present	Incumbent
