= Diocese of Youngstown =

Ecclesiastical jurisdiction in Ohio, US

Diocese of Youngstown Dioecesis Youngstonensis
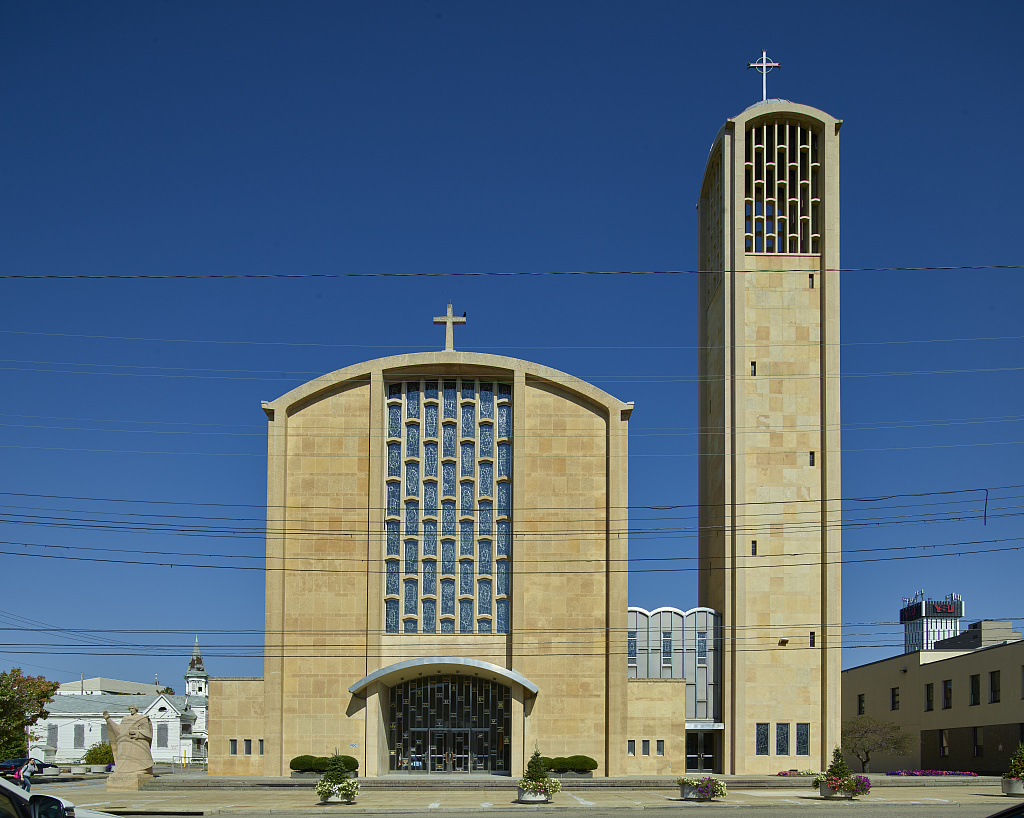
- St. Columba Cathedral

- Coat of arms

Location
- Country: United States
- Territory: Counties of Mahoning, Trumbull, Columbiana, Stark, Portage, and Ashtabula, Ohio
- Ecclesiastical province: Cincinnati
- Coordinates: 41°06′11″N 80°39′02″W

Statistics
- Area: 3,404 sq mi (8,820 km^{2})
- Population: Total; Catholics: (as of 2020); 1,175,115; 163,650 (13.9%)
- Parishes: 86

Information
- Denomination: Catholic
- Sui iuris church: Latin Church
- Rite: Roman Rite
- Established: May 15, 1943 (83 years ago)
- Cathedral: St. Columba Cathedral
- Patron saint: St. Columba
- Secular priests: 103

Current leadership
- Pope: Leo XIV
- Bishop: David Bonnar
- Metropolitan Archbishop: Robert Gerald Casey

Map
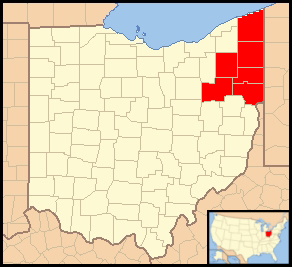

Website
- doy.org

The Diocese of Youngstown (Latin: Dioecesis Youngstonensis) is a diocese of the Catholic Church in northeastern Ohio in the United States. It is a suffragan diocese of the Archdiocese of Cincinnati. The mother church is St. Columba Cathedral.

== Statistics ==
As of 2025, the Diocese of Youngstown contained 67 parishes with 47 active diocesan priests, 56 retired diocesan priests, 5 extern priests, 18 religious priests, 68 permanent deacons, 6 male religious, and 135 female religious. In 2020, it had a Catholic population of 163,650 (13.9% of the total population) in an area totaling 3,404 square miles (8,820 km^{2}).

As of 2025, the diocese had 8 seminarians studying at the St. Mary Seminary in Wickliffe, Ohio.

== History ==
=== 1700 to 1850 ===
During the 17th century, present-day Ohio was part of the French colony of New France. The Diocese of Quebec had jurisdiction over the region. However, unlike other parts of the future American Midwest, there were no attempts to found Catholic missions in Ohio.

In 1763, after the end of the French and Indian War, Ohio Country became part of the British Province of Quebec, forbidden from settlement by American colonists. After the American Revolution ended in 1783, Pope Pius VI wanted to remove American Catholics from the jurisdiction of their British diocese. He erected the Prefecture Apostolic of the United States in 1784, encompassing the entire territory of the new nation. In 1787, the Ohio area became part of the Northwest Territory of the United States. Pius VI in 1789 created the Diocese of Baltimore, the first diocese in the United States, to replace the prefecture apostolic.

In 1808, Pope Pius VII erected the Diocese of Bardstown, with jurisdiction over the new state of Ohio along with the other midwest states. Pope Pius VII erected the Diocese of Cincinnati in 1821, taking all of Ohio from Bardstown. Saint Philip Neri Parish was established in 1817 in Dungannon.

Pope Pius IX erected the Diocese of Cleveland in 1847, with territory taken from Cincinnati. Northeastern Ohio would remain part of the Diocese of Cleveland for the next 97 years. The first Catholic parish in Youngstown, St. Columba, was established in 1847. Its first church was completed in 1850.

=== 1850 to 1900 ===
One of the earliest Roman Catholic communities in eastern Ohio was in Ashtabula. In 1850, a small group of Catholics in Ashtabula petitioned the Diocese of Cleveland for their own parish. However, the diocese denied the request due to a shortage of clergy. Instead, it assigned a priest from Painesville to periodically undertake a day's journey by horse to Ashtabula to minister to Catholics there.

In 1858, the diocese established the St. Joseph Mission in Ashtabula and assigned Charles Coquelle as its resident priest. Its original members were primarily Irish and German immigrants, drawn to Ashtabula by the railroad industry. Masses were celebrated in private homes until 1860, when parishioners constructed a small wooden frame church. The purchase of an additional five acres in 1877 allowed construction of St. Joseph's two-story brick secondary school, staffed by the Sisters of the Humility of Mary.

In 1878, a group of Catholics began celebrating mass in a grocery store adjacent to Ashtabula Harbor. Mother of Sorrows Parish was established there in 1890. The parish constructged a permanent church in 1898.

=== 1900 to 1943 ===
Towards the turn of the century, a large influx of Italian Catholics prompted the formation of a third church in Ashtabula. In 1902, parishioners began construction of Our Lady of Mount Carmel Church. The first mass in the new church was celebrated in 1903. As the Catholic presence grew in Ashtabula, parishioners started building a large masonry building to replace the original St. Joseph's Church in 1905. That church cost $34,000 to build.

The Sisters of the Humility Mary in 1911 opened St. Elizabeth's Hospital in Youngstown. Today it is Mercy Health – St. Elizabeth Youngstown Hospital. The Sisters in 1924 also started staffing St. Joseph Warren Hospital in Warren. It is today Mercy Health – St. Joseph Warren Hospital.

=== 1943 to 1970 ===
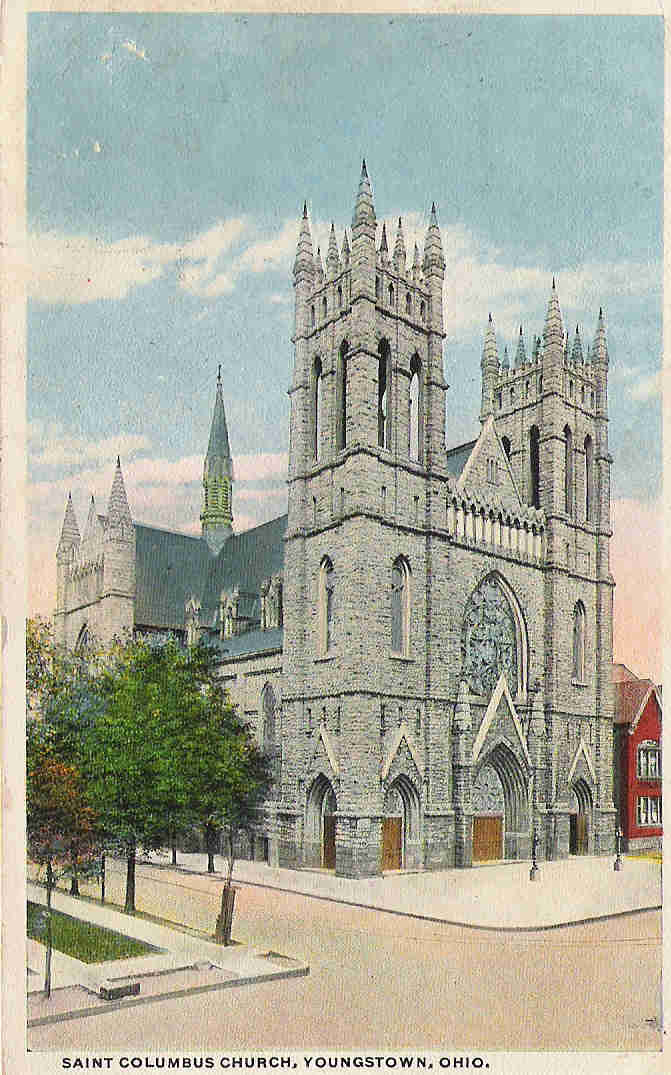
St. Columba's Church, Youngstown, Ohio. Was cathedral from 1943 to its destruction by fire 1954 (1916)

Pope Pius XII erected the Diocese of Youngstown with territory from Diocese of Cleveland in 1943. The new diocese included the counties of Ashtabula, Columbiana, Mahoning, Portage, Stark, and Trumbull. The pope named Auxiliary Bishop James A. McFadden of Cleveland as the first bishop of Youngstown. St. Columba Church in Youngstown became the cathedral for the diocese.The new diocese covered 3,404 square miles (8,820 km^{2}) with 110 parishes, three Catholic-run hospitals, 54 elementary schools, one junior high school, and three Catholic high schools.

In 1949, Pius XII appointed Bishop Emmet M. Walsh of the Diocese of Charleston as a coadjutor bishop to assist McFadden. After McFadden died in 1952, Walsh succeeded automatically succeeded him as bishop. In 1954, a lightening strike on St. Columba Cathedral set it on fire, resulting in a total loss. Walsh immediately started planning a new cathedral. St. Patrick Church in Youngstown served as the pro-cathedral until the new St. Columba's was dedicated in 1958.

In 1960, Pope John XXIII named James Malone of Youngstown as an auxiliary bishop for the diocese. Walsh College, a men's college, was founded in North Canton in 1960 by the Brothers of Christian Instruction. Today it is Walsh University After Walsh died in 1968, Pope Paul VI appointed Malone as bishop that same year.

=== 1970 to present ===
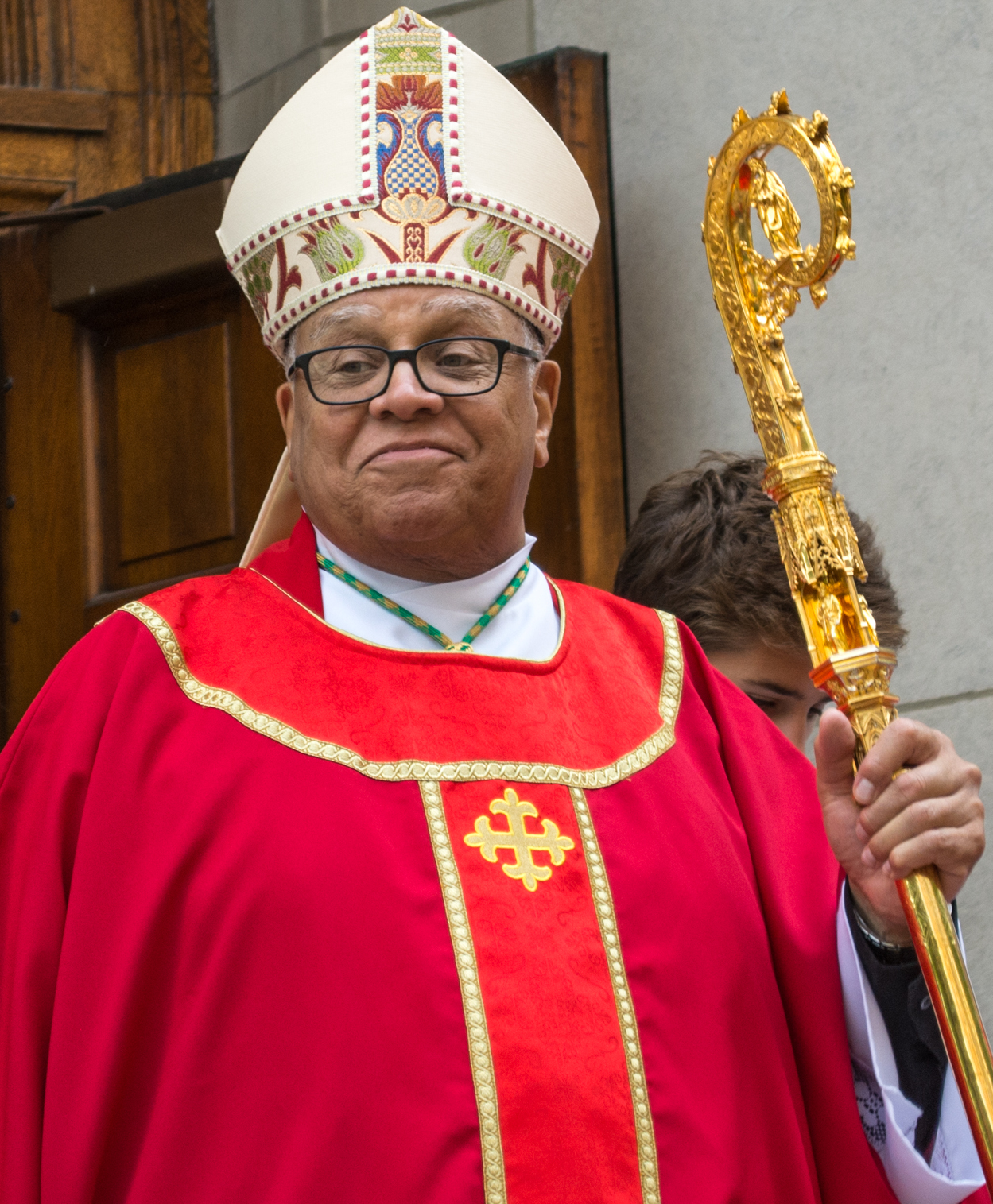
Bishop Murry (2018)

The closing of Youngstown Sheet and Tube in Youngstown in 1977 resulted in 5,000 workers losing their jobs. Malone had led an unsuccessful effort by clergy from different faiths to stop the factory closing. A strong advocate of interfaith communication, Malone was elected as the first Catholic leader of the Ohio Council of Churches. He delivered sermons in Protestant churches and urged his priests to establish contacts with non-Catholic congregations. Malone retired as bishop of Youngstown in 1996 after 28 years. Pope John Paul II appointed Auxiliary Bishop Thomas J. Tobin from the Diocese of Pittsburgh as the fourth bishop of Youngstown in 1996.

In 2005, John Paul II appointed Tobin as bishop of the Diocese of Providence. The pope did not replace Tobin for almost two years. During the interim, Robert J. Siffrin served as diocesan administrator. In 2007, Pope Benedict XVI named Bishop George Murry of the Diocese of St. Thomas as the fifth bishop of Youngstown. In 2010, Murry announced the reconfiguration of parishes in the diocese, reducing the total number to 87. In 2013, the diocese settled 11 sexual abuse lawsuits brought by former high school students in Warren who had been sexually abused by Stephen Baker, a Franciscan friar. When the settlement was announced, Baker committed suicide at his monastery in Pennsylvania. In 2016, the diocese and the Franciscans were ordered to pay $900,000 to settle 28 more claims of sexual abuse by him. In October 2018, the diocese released a list of over 30 priests and other clergy with credible accusations of sexual abuse of minors.

In May 2020, Murry died of leukemia. Siffrin served again as diocesan administrator from June 2020 to January 2021. During the absence of a bishop, Bishop Emeritus Martin J. Amos of the Diocese of Davenport performed ordinations for the diocese. In November 2020, Pope Francis named David J. Bonnar of Pittsburgh as the sixth bishop of Youngstown.

From 2000 to 2018, baptisms fell by 69%, weddings by 62%, first communions by 61%, and funerals by 25% in the diocese. The Catholic population fell by 36%, compared with a total population decrease of 4.3%. As of 2026, Bonnar is the bishop of Youngstown.

== Bishops ==
=== Bishops of Youngstown ===
1. James A. McFadden (1943–1952)
2. Emmet M. Walsh (1952–1968; Coadjutor 1949–1952)
3. James W. Malone (1968–1995)
4. Thomas J. Tobin (1995–2005), appointed Bishop of Providence
5. George V. Murry (2007–2020)
6. David Bonnar (2021–present)

=== Auxiliary bishops of Youngstown ===
- James W. Malone (1960–1968), appointed Bishop of Youngstown
- William A. Hughes (1974–1979), appointed Bishop of Covington
- Benedict C. Franzetta (1980–1996)

=== Other affiliated bishops ===
- John Keehner, Bishop of Sioux City (2025–)

== Education ==
=== Schools operated by diocese ===
==== High schools ====
- Cardinal Mooney High School (9-12 grades) – Youngstown
- Central Catholic High School (9-12 grades) – Canton
- John F. Kennedy High School (6-12 grades) – Warren (Upper Campus)
- St. John School (K-12 grades) - Ashtabula
- St. Thomas Aquinas High School (6-12 grades) – Louisville
- Ursuline High School (9-12 grades) – Youngstown

=== Higher education ===
Walsh University – North Canton

== Print media ==
The Diocese of Youngstown for 78 years published a print newspaper, The Catholic Exponent. Started in 1944, the Exponent was replaced in 2023 by the Catholic Echo, a magazine published 10 times a year.
