= Ursuline High School (Youngstown, Ohio) =

Private, parichial, coeducational school in Youngstown, Ohio, United States

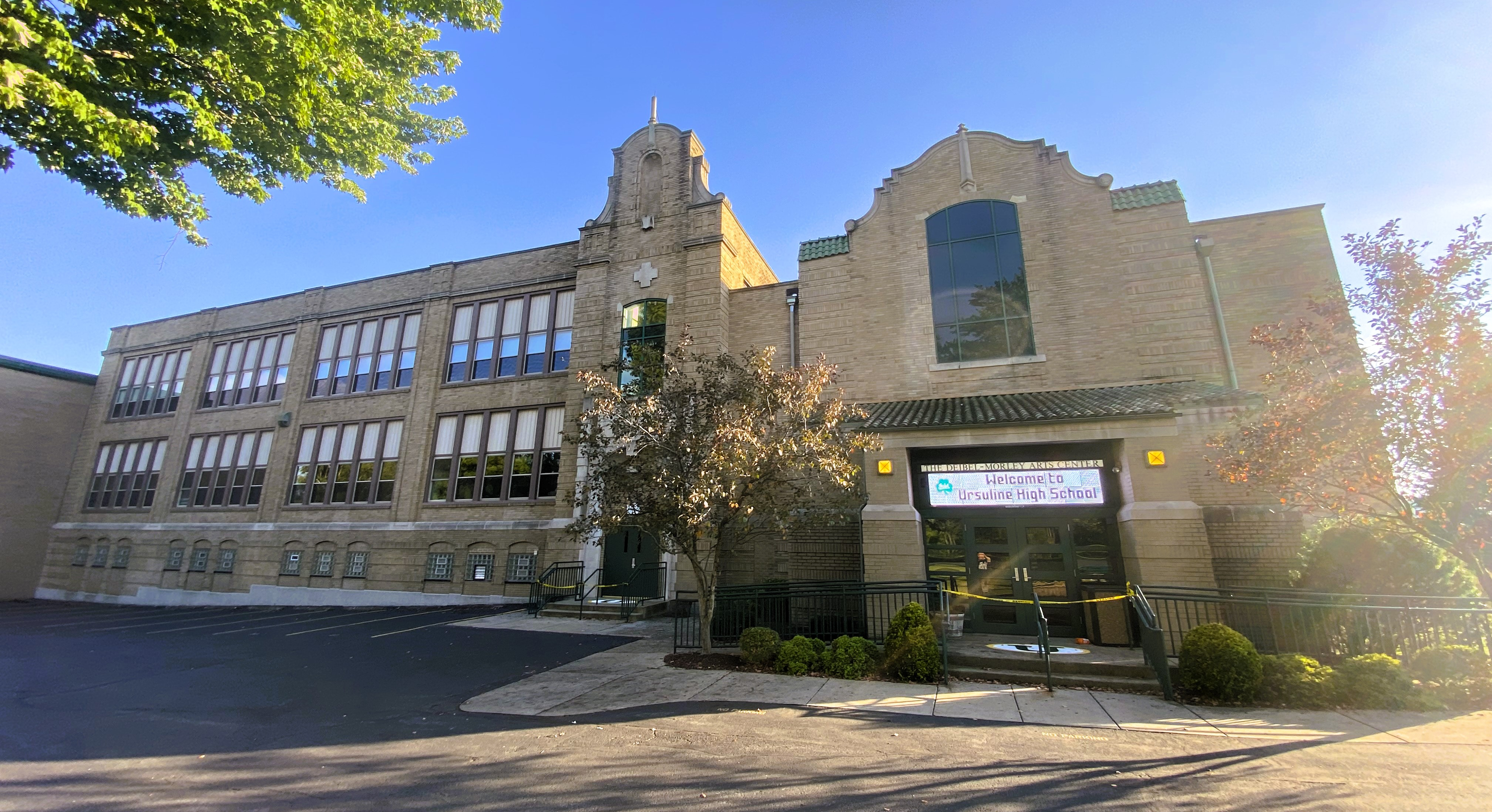

Location
- 750 Wick Avenue; Youngstown, Ohio, (Mahoning County) 44505-2827; United States
- 41°6′35″N 80°38′35″W

Information
- Type: Private, parochial, coeducational
- Motto: Soli Deo Gloria (For the Glory of God Alone)
- Religious affiliation: Roman Catholic
- Established: 1905
- Oversight: Diocese of Youngstown
- President: Richard Murphy
- Principal: Matthew Sammartino
- Faculty: 35
- Grades: 9-12
- Enrollment: 478 (2025)
- Colors: Green and gold
- Team name: Fighting Irish
- Accreditation: North Central Association of Colleges and Schools
- Newspaper: The Irish Times
- Yearbook: Ursulinian
- Literary magazine: The Seanachie
- Website: www.ursuline.com

Ursuline High School is a private Catholic college preparatory high school in Youngstown, Ohio, United States. It operates as part of the Diocese of Youngstown. Athletic teams are known as the Fighting Irish and they compete as a member of the Ohio High School Athletic Association.

== History ==
Ursuline High School was founded as the Ursuline Academy of the Holy Name of Jesus in 1905 by the Ursuline Sisters as a day school for girls, located on West Rayen Avenue. The Ursulines purchased the former Chauncey Andrews Estate on Wick Avenue in Youngstown's North Side in February 1919. The oldest portion of the current Ursuline High School building was completed in April 1925. The school became coeducational in 1930.

=== 2025 football hazing allegations ===
In September 2025, a federal civil rights lawsuit was filed against the school, the Catholic Diocese of Youngstown, and numerous administrators and athletic coaches for an alleged hazing incident earlier that year. The lawsuit claimed that two football players allegedly assaulted another student as part of a hazing ritual in June 2025, where the student was forcibly restrained, stripped of his clothing, and sexually assaulted. Parts of the incident were recorded and circulated on social media and, prior to the incident, some students spoke openly about the planned hazing in front of coaches; however, they allegedly dismissed these discussions as "boys just being boys".

Principal Matthew Sammartino released a statement in July 2025 to parents regarding the situation, reassuring them that both the school and the Diocese of Youngstown were actively cooperating with law enforcement. Another statement was released the following month, describing the event as isolated and stating that faculty would receive additional training. The school later canceled the remainder of the 2025 football season after all of its opponents proactively canceled their games with Ursuline.

== Academics ==
The instructional program at Ursuline High School is designed for the college-bound student but is flexible enough to meet the needs of most students. Ursuline offers Honors and Advanced Placement sections in English, French, Spanish, American History, American Government, science and mathematics to challenge students who are gifted in those particular areas.

== Athletics ==
Ursuline High School offers:

- Baseball
- Basketball
- Bowling
- Cheerleading
- Cross country
- Golf
- Football
- Soccer
- Softball
- Tennis
- Track and field
- Volleyball

=== OHSAA state championships ===
- Baseball — 1988, 2000
- Football — 2000, 2008, 2009, 2010
- Boys golf —1975, 1976
- Boys basketball — 1994
- Girls basketball — 2004

=== Associated Press state championships ===
- Football — 2008, 2010

== Notable alumni ==
- Pat Bilon, actor
- Daryll Clark, former professional football player
- Jim Cummings, voice actor
- Mark Dailey, television journalist
- Mike Echols, former professional football player in the National Football League (NFL)
- Bob Hagan, politician
- Tim Hagan, politician
- Tony Hinchcliffe, comedian
- Paul Maguire, former professional football player in the American Football League (AFL), TV sportscaster
- Lauren McNally, politician
- Pat Narduzzi, college football head coach
- Ed O'Neill, actor
- Darrell K. Smith, former professional football player in the Canadian Football League (CFL)
