= St. Columba Cathedral (Youngstown, Ohio) =

Catholic cathedral in Ohio, US

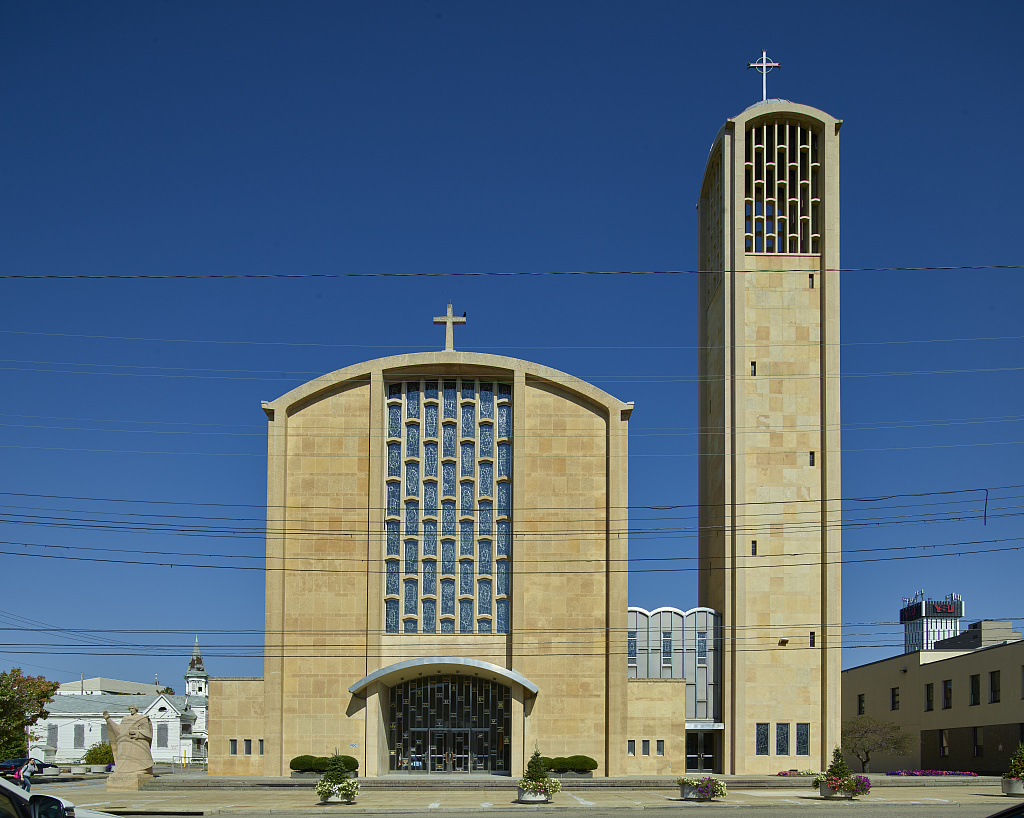

- Location in Ohio
- 41°06′12″N 80°39′03″W
- Location: W. Wood and Elm Streets; Youngstown, Ohio
- Country: United States
- Denomination: Catholic Church
- Sui iuris church: Latin Church
- Website: www.stcolumbacathedral.org

History
- Founded: 1847
- Dedication: Columba

Architecture
- Architect(s): Diehl and Diehl
- Style: Modern
- Completed: 1958

Specifications
- Materials: Mankato stone

Administration
- Diocese: Youngstown

Clergy
- Bishop: Most Rev. David Bonnar
- Rector: Msgr. Robert J. Siffrin
- Vicar: Father Matthew Zwilling

St. Columba Cathedral is a Catholic parish and the cathedral church of the Diocese of Youngstown, in Youngstown, Ohio, United States.

== History ==
=== St. Columba Parish ===
The first Mass celebrated in Youngstown occurred in 1826. St. Columba Parish was founded in 1847, the year that Pope Pius IX established the Diocese of Cleveland, of which Youngstown was a part. The first church was completed in 1850. As the parish grew, it required a larger church, which it completed in 1868. The first parish school building was opened three years later.

The parish continued to grow and constructed yet another church which opened in 1897. Bishop Ignatius Horstmann consecrated the sanctuary in 1903. The parish added a convent for the Ursuline Sisters the same year and the copper-covered spires in 1927. The parish continued to use the 1868 church until it was demolished in 1940.

=== St. Columba Cathedral ===
Pope Pius XII established the Diocese of Youngstown on May 15, 1943, Bishop James A. McFadden chose St. Columba as cathedral of the new diocese. The parish opened a new school to the rear of the cathedral in 1952. Two years later, on September 2 a disastrous fire destroyed the cathedral. The diocese selected Diehl and Diehl Architects of Detroit to design the new cathedral in the Modern architectural style. Charles Shutrump and Sons Company of Youngstown was the contractor. The new cathedral was completed in 1958 and it became the fourth structure to house the parish. An 11 feet (3.4 m) statue of St. Columba by Joseph M. DiLauro of Detroit occupies a space at the southwest corner of the entrance. It is sculpted from four blocks of Mankato stone. The cathedral celebrated its first English-language Mass in 1964 while the Second Vatican Council was in session.

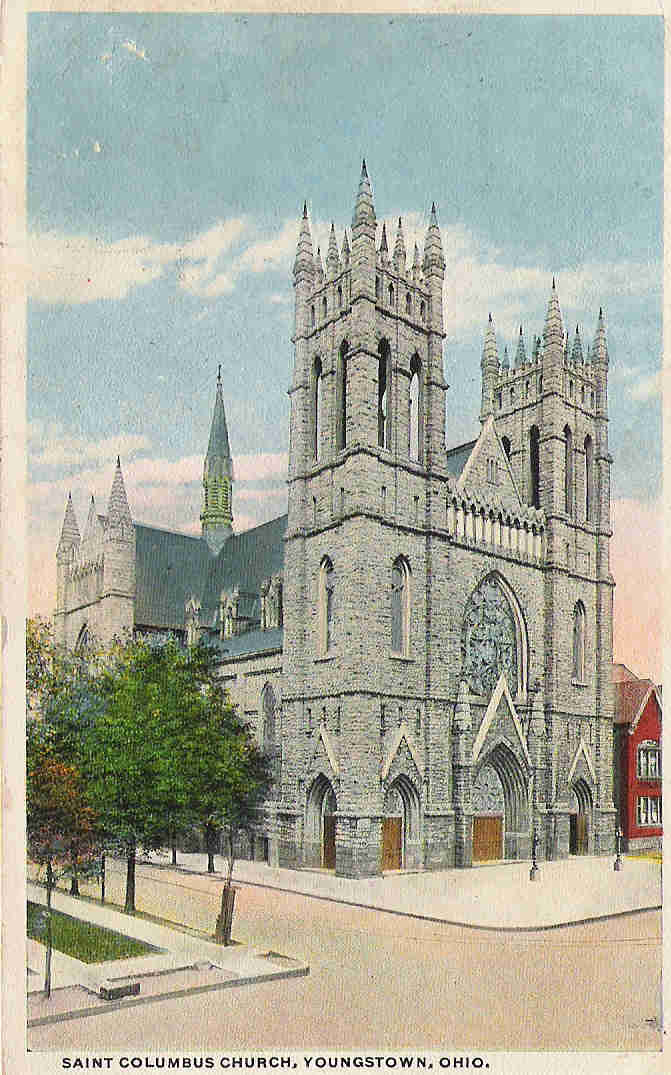
Original cathedral

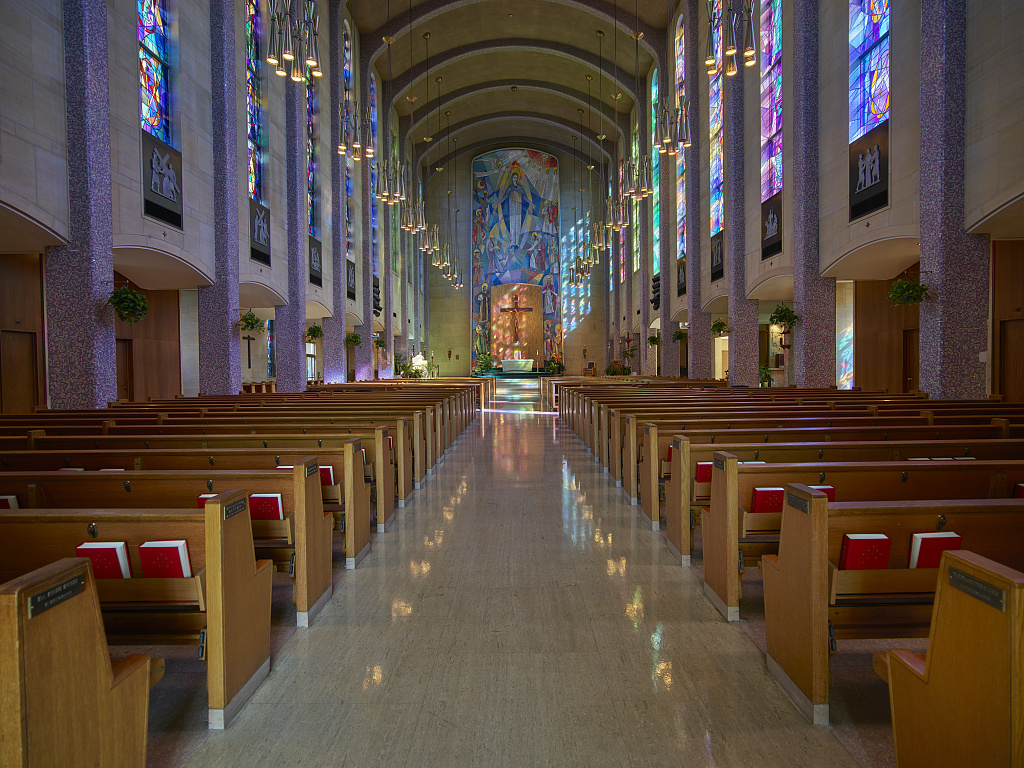
View up the nave toward the sanctuary

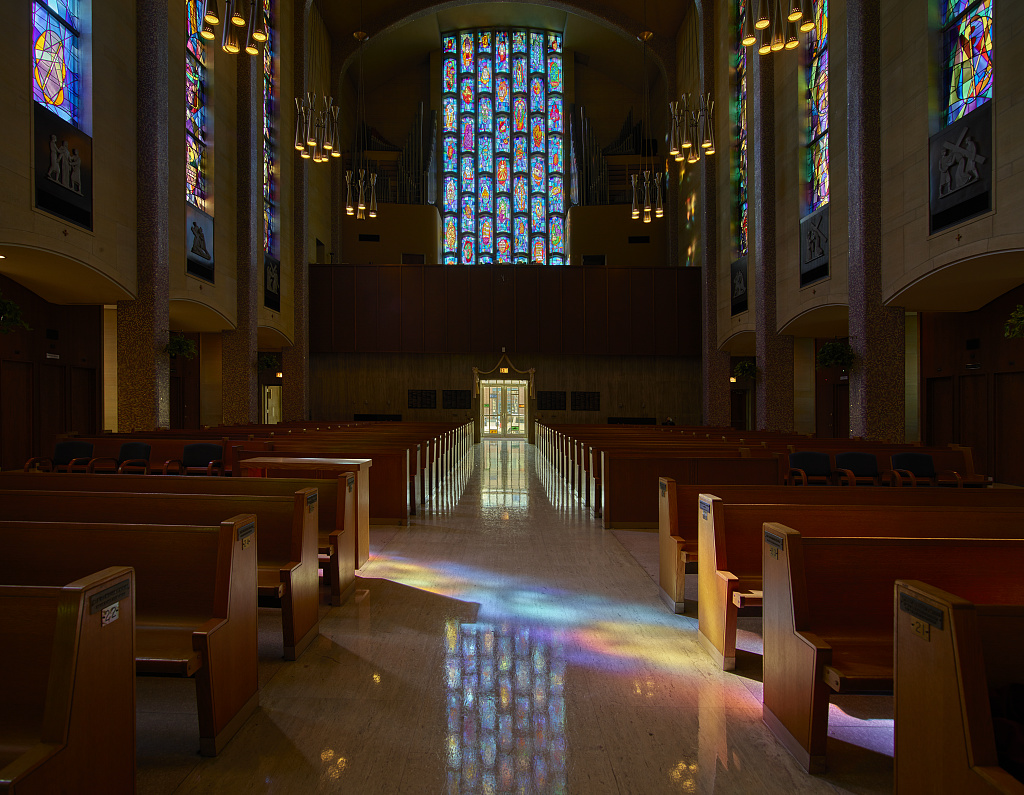
View down the nave toward the gallery

== See also ==
- List of Catholic cathedrals in the United States
- List of cathedrals in the United States
