= Saints Peter and Paul Cathedral (St. Thomas, U.S. Virgin Islands) =

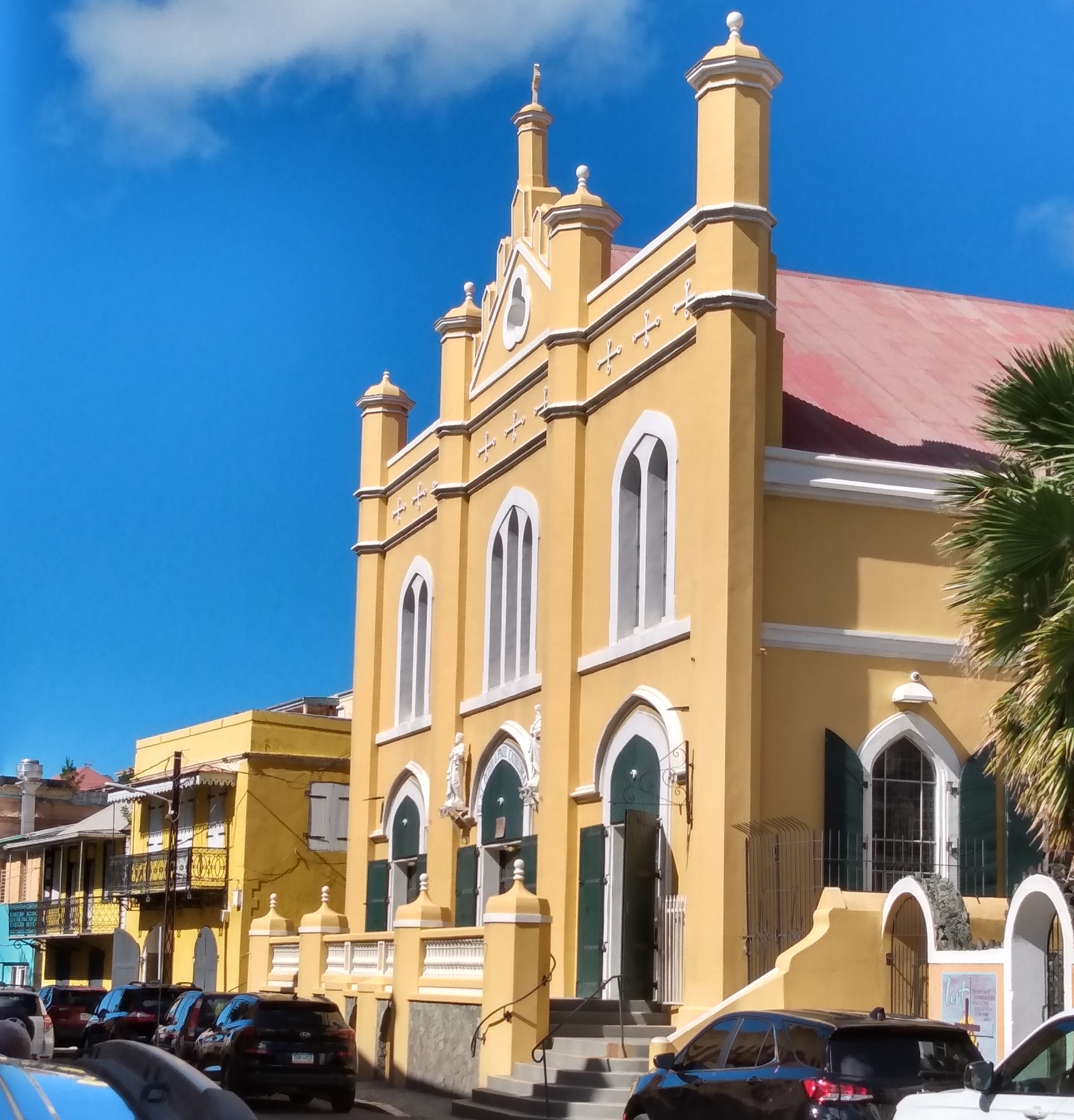
- Saints Peter and Paul Cathedral
- Saints Peter and Paul Cathedral
- 18°20′27.64″N 64°56′12.45″W
- Location: 22 Kronprindsens Gade Saint Thomas, U.S. Virgin Islands (United States Virgin Islands) , United States
- Denomination: Roman Catholic
- Website: cathedralvi.org

History
- Status: Cathedral/Parish church
- Founded: 1806
- Dedication: Saint Peter and Saint Paul

Architecture
- Completed: 1848

Administration
- Diocese: St. Thomas

Clergy
- Bishop: Most Rev. Jerome Feudjio
- Rector: Rev. Fr. Joseph Nguele Toko

Saints Peter and Paul Cathedral is a historic Catholic church in the United States Virgin Islands. It is the mother church and seat of the Diocese of Saint Thomas. It is located in the city of Charlotte Amalie.

== History ==
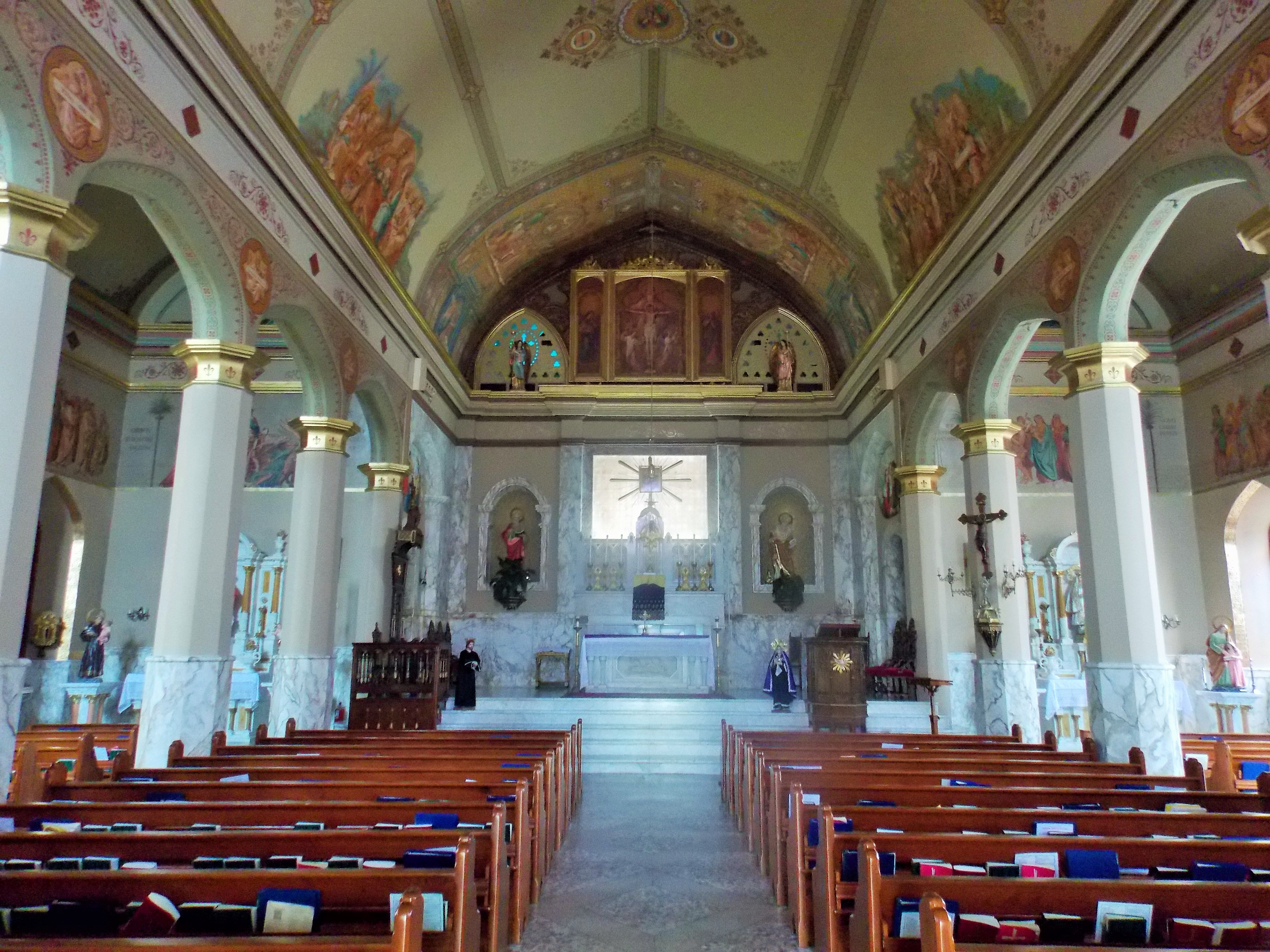
Cathedral interior

King Christian VII of Denmark officially sanctioned the Catholic Church in 1773. The first Catholic church building in the Danish West Indies, present day U.S. Virgin Islands, was purchased from the Danish Crown in 1802. It was destroyed in a fire two years later. The first church under the patronage of the apostles Peter and Paul was consecrated in 1806. The first church building on the present location was completed in 1828. A hurricane in 1837 destroyed most of that building. The present church building was completed in 1848. The Rev. Louis Dold, C.Ss.R. was the first Redemptorist of the Baltimore Province to pastor the parish. When Pope John XXIII created the Prelature of the Virgin Islands, the Church of Saints Peter and Paul became its cathedral church. The Redemptorists left the parish in 1989 and Msgr. Michael F. Kosak was the first diocesan priest to serve as cathedral rector.

There are more than 12 scenes from the Old and New Testaments depicted in murals on the cathedral's ceiling. A capital campaign to restore and refurbish the cathedral began in 2004.

== See also ==
- List of Catholic cathedrals in the United States
- List of cathedrals in the United States
