= David Zubik =

American Catholic prelate (born 1949)

His Excellency, The Most Reverend David Zubik
- Bishop Emeritus of Pittsburgh
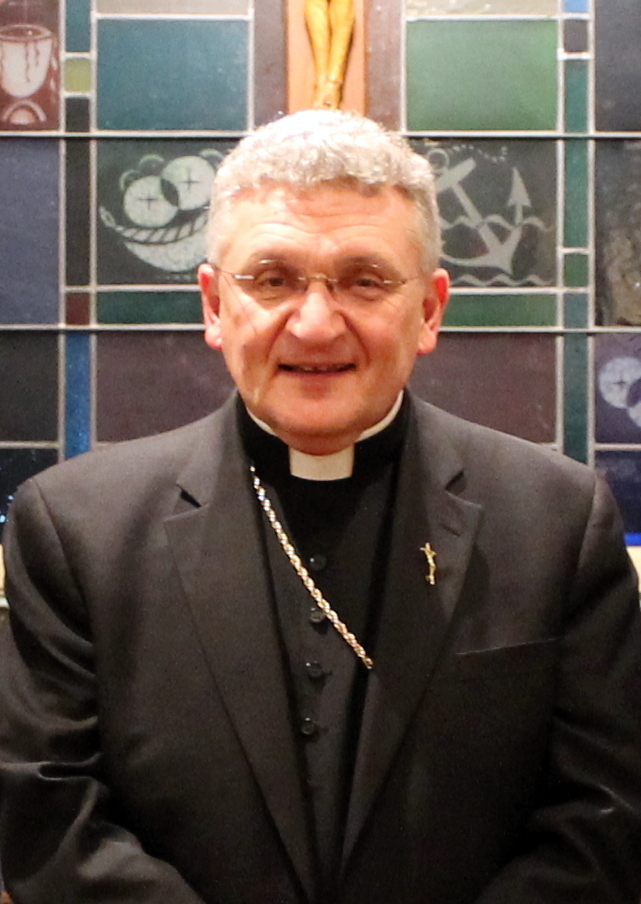
- Zubik in 2013
- Diocese: Pittsburgh
- Appointed: July 18, 2007
- Installed: September 28, 2007
- Retired: June 4, 2025
- Predecessor: Donald Wuerl
- Successor: Mark Eckman
- Previous posts: Bishop of Green Bay (2003–2007); Auxiliary Bishop of Pittsburgh and Titular Bishop of Jamestown (1997–2003)

Orders
- Ordination: May 3, 1975 by Vincent Leonard
- Consecration: April 6, 1997 by Donald Wuerl, Nicholas C. Dattilo, and Thomas Joseph Tobin

Personal details
- Born: David Allen Zubik; September 4, 1949 (age 76) Ambridge, Pennsylvania, US
- Education: St. Paul Seminary; Duquesne University; St. Mary's Seminary and University
- Motto: Nothing is impossible with God
- Styles
- Reference style: His Excellency; The Most Reverend
- Spoken style: Your Excellency
- Religious style: Bishop

David Allen Zubik (/ˈzuːbɪk/ ZOO-bik; born September 4, 1949) is a retired American Catholic prelate who served as Bishop of Pittsburgh from 2007 to 2025. He previously served as Bishop of Green Bay from 2003 to 2007, and as Auxiliary Bishop of Pittsburgh from 1997 to 2003.

== Biography ==
=== Early life and education ===
David Allen Zubik was born on September 4, 1949, in Sewickley, Pennsylvania, to Stanley (1927-2015) and Susan Zubik (née Raskosky; 1925-2006). The grandson of Polish and Slovak immigrants, he is an only child. He was raised in Ambridge, Pennsylvania where he attended St. Stanislaus Church. His parents would take him to a local amusement park after Sunday Mass. Zubik first considered becoming a priest in the first grade, but later thought about a law career. He finally decided to enter the priesthood after attending a retreat in 1965 in Pittsburgh.

After graduating from St. Veronica High School in Ambridge in 1967, he entered St. Paul Seminary in Pittsburgh. He earned an undergraduate degree from Duquesne University in Pittsburgh in 1971. Zubik continued his studies at St. Mary's Seminary and University in Baltimore, Maryland, earning a Master of Divinity degree in 1975.

=== Ordination and Priestly Ministry ===
Zubik was ordained to the priesthood by Bishop Vincent Leonard on May 3, 1975, for the Diocese of Pittsburgh at Saint Paul Cathedral in Pittsburgh. After his 1975 ordination, the diocese assigned Zubik as the parochial vicar of Sacred Heart Parish in Pittsburgh. He was also named as vice-principal of Quigley Catholic High School in Baden, Pennsylvania, and chaplain to the Sisters of St. Joseph in Baden. During this period, Zubik returned to Duquesne, receiving a Master of Educational Administration degree in 1982.

From 1987 to 1991, Zubik served as priest-secretary to Bishop Anthony Bevilacqua. Zubik became an associate spiritual director of St. Vincent Seminary in Latrobe, Pennsylvania, in 1989. Bishop Donald Wuerl appointed Zubik as diocesan director of clergy personnel in 1991. He was named president of the diocesan finance council in 1995. In 1996, Zubik was appointed as vicar general and moderator of the curia for the diocese.

=== Auxiliary Bishop of Pittsburgh ===
On February 18, 1997, Zubik was appointed auxiliary bishop of Pittsburgh and titular bishop of Jamestown by Pope John Paul II. He received his episcopal consecration on April 6, 1997, from Wuerl, with Bishops Nicholas Dattilo and Thomas Tobin serving as co-consecrators, at St. Paul Cathedral. Zubik selected as his episcopal motto: "Nothing is Impossible with God" (Luke 1:37).

=== Bishop of Green Bay ===
Zubik was named the eleventh bishop of Green Bay by John Paul II on October 10, 2003, replacing Bishop Robert Banks. Zubik was installed on December 12, 2003. In address to sexual abuse scandals, Zubik met with representatives of the Survivors Network of those Abused by Priests (SNAP), but was criticized by the group for not disclosing the names of priests who were accused of sexual abuse but never sued or charged with a crime.

=== Bishop of Pittsburgh ===
Pope Benedict XVI appointed Zubik the twelfth bishop of Pittsburgh on July 18, 2007. He was installed on September 28, 2007. After his installation, Zubik declined to take up residence at the episcopal mansion in Pittsburgh, the bishop's residence since 1949. He instead moved into Saint Paul Seminary, explaining that the Catholic church needed to move away from being "attached to buildings".

In April 2009, Zubik held a Service of Apology at St. Paul Cathedral, where he begged the "forgiveness of anyone hurt by the Church... in any way." Under Zubik, the diocese implemented a policy of reporting all allegations of sexual abuse to law enforcement. Zubik in 2010 handed off the case of David Dzermejko to the Vatican after a diocese review board found credible allegations of child sexual abuse against him. The diocese had removed Dzermejko as pastor of Mary, Mother of the Church Parish in Charleroi in June 2009 after a couple informed the diocese that he had sexually abused their son. Another man came forward to say that Dzermejko had abused him as a child. Dzermejko was removed within 48 hours of the diocese receiving the first allegation.

In 2018, after the Tree of Life Synagogue shooting in Pittsburgh that left 12 people dead, Zubik strongly condemned antisemitism and called for prayers for the victims.

In August 2020, Zubik and the diocese were named in civil litigation related to sexual abuse by diocesan personnel. The plaintiffs claimed that Wuerl had broken a promise he made in 1994 not to reassign Leo Burchianti to another parish following accusations of sexually abusing at least eight boys. However, Wuerl and Zubik gave Burchianti a voluntary work assignment at St. John Vianney Manor, a home for retired priests. Burchianti remained there from 1995 to 2012 and died in 2013. Zubik has also been named as a defendant in other sex abuse lawsuits involving the diocese as well.

In November 2023, Zubik underwent back surgery to correct collapsing discs, the sixth such procedure he has had.

==== Pennsylvania grand jury report ====
In August 2018, Pennsylvania Attorney General Josh Shapiro published a grand jury report on sexual abuse committed by Catholic clergy in six dioceses in the state, including the Diocese of Pittsburgh. Zubik apologized for the abuse in Pittsburgh that was detailed in the report, "In the name of the Church of Pittsburgh, and in my own name, and in the name of my predecessors, we are sorry. I am sorry." Zubik also stated that the details of the report disgusted him. He offered to apologize in person to victims, but acknowledged that apologies would not be enough.

The grand jury report found that when Zubik was director of clergy personnel in the early 1990s, he knew about allegations of sexual abuse against minors made against Ernest Paone, but did not contact law enforcement. Instead, Zubik concealed the allegations in the diocesan confidential files. In response, Zubik said that neither he or Wuerl attempted to cover up sexual abuse allegations:

The Diocese of Pittsburgh is not the church described in the report. That means that the report ignores 30 years of reforms and actions to protect children and identify and remove abusing priests from ministry." ... "The truth is that 90 percent of the incidents of abuse occurred before 1990, and the efforts we have made to protect children—such as turning over allegations to law enforcement, creating the first Independent Review Board and training more than 70,000 people on how to look for and report abuse—have significantly reduced the incidents of abuse.

==== Retirement ====
On June 4, 2025, Pope Leo XIV accepted his resignation that was tendered upon turning 75 years old, naming auxiliary bishop Mark Eckman as his successor.

== Viewpoints ==
=== Abortion and same-sex marriage ===
During the 2004 US presidential election, Zubik urged Catholics to consider Catholic teachings on abortion rights and same-sex marriage before voting. Although he has said that Catholic politicians who support abortion rights for women should refrain from receiving communion, Zubik has also stated he would not deny them communion.

Zubik in 2009 described the University of Notre Dame's decision to have President Barack Obama deliver its commencement speech and receive an honorary degree as "painful" and "embarrassing," Zubik said that Obama was "the single most outspoken pro-abortion president since the issue was foisted upon the country by the Supreme Court."

=== Capital punishment ===
Zubik opposes capital punishment.

=== Immigration ===
In July 2014, Zubik gave his support to the Holy Family institute in Emsworth, Pennsylvania, which provided housing, food and other support to child immigrants from Central America.

Zubik in February 2017 released a statement calling on Catholics to put aside fears of immigrants and refugees. This was in response to an action by the Trump Administration banning immigration from seven Muslim-majority nations.

=== LGBTQ issues ===
Zubik canceled a planned Mass at Duquesne University in July 2023 that was advertised in flyers as a "Pride Mass". He said that he had not heard of the Mass nor approved it. Organizers said that the Mass was mislabeled, that it was planned to show solidarity with LGBTQ individuals.

== See also ==
- Catholic Church hierarchy
- Catholic Church in the United States
- Historical list of the Catholic bishops of the United States
- List of Catholic bishops of the United States
- Lists of patriarchs, archbishops, and bishops
- Zubik v. Burwell — a case before the U.S. Supreme Court on the contraceptive mandate

Catholic Church titles
| Preceded by Donald Wuerl | Bishop of Pittsburgh; 2007–2025 | Succeeded by Mark Eckman |
| Preceded by Robert Banks | Bishop of Green Bay; 2003–2007 | Succeeded by David Laurin Ricken |
| Preceded by – | Auxiliary Bishop of Pittsburgh; 1997–2003 | Succeeded by – |
| Preceded by Created | Titular Bishop of Jamestown; 1997–2003 | Succeeded by Gaetano Aldo Donato |
