= Thomas Joseph Tobin =

American Catholic prelate (born 1948)

His Excellency, The Most Reverend Thomas Joseph Tobin
- Bishop Emeritus of Providence
- Diocese: Providence
- Appointed: March 31, 2005
- Installed: May 31, 2005
- Retired: May 1, 2023
- Predecessor: Robert Mulvee
- Successor: Richard G. Henning
- Previous posts: Bishop of Youngstown (1996‍–‍2005); Auxiliary Bishop of Pittsburgh (1992‍–‍1995); Titular Bishop of Novica (1992‍–‍1995)

Orders
- Ordination: July 21, 1973 by Vincent Leonard
- Consecration: December 27, 1992 by Donald Wuerl, Anthony G. Bosco, and Nicholas C. Dattilo

Personal details
- Born: April 1, 1948 (age 78) Pittsburgh, Pennsylvania, US
- Education: Gannon University; Saint Francis University; Pontifical North American College; Pontifical Gregorian University; Pontifical Atheneum of St. Anselm
- Motto: Strong - loving - wise

Styles of Thomas Joseph Tobin
- Reference style: His Excellency; The Most Reverend
- Spoken style: Your Excellency
- Religious style: Bishop

Thomas Joseph Tobin (born April 1, 1948) is an American Catholic prelate who served as Bishop of Providence from 2005 to 2023. He previously served as Bishop of Youngstown from 1996 to 2005 and as auxiliary bishop for the Diocese of Pittsburgh from 1992 to 1995.

== Biography ==
=== Early life ===
Thomas Tobin was born on April 1, 1948, in Pittsburgh, Pennsylvania. He studied at St. Mark Seminary High School and Gannon University, both in Erie, Pennsylvania. He then entered St. Francis University in Loretto, Pennsylvania, where he received his bachelor's degree in 1969.

Tobin went to Rome to reside at the Pontifical North American College while studying at the Pontifical Gregorian University in Rome. He also pursued his graduate studies at the Pontifical Atheneum of St. Anselm in Rome.

=== Priesthood ===
Tobin was ordained to the priesthood by Bishop Vincent Leonard for the Diocese of Pittsburgh at the Cathedral of Saint Paul in Pittsburgh on July 21, 1973. After his ordination, the diocese assigned Tobin as an assistant pastor at St. Vitus Parish in New Castle, Pennsylvania, for six years. In 1979, he was appointed assistant pastor at St. Sebastian Parish in Ross Township. Pennsylvania, serving there until 1984.

Tobin was named administrative secretary to Bishop Anthony Bevilacqua, then associate general secretary of the diocese in 1987, and vicar general and general secretary in 1990.

=== Bishop ===
==== Auxiliary Bishop of Pittsburgh ====
On November 3, 1992, Tobin was appointed as auxiliary bishop of Pittsburgh and titular bishop of Novica by Pope John Paul II. He received his episcopal consecration on December 27, 1992, at Saint Paul Cathedral from Bishop Donald Wuerl, with Bishops Anthony Bosco and Nicholas C. Dattilo serving as co-consecrators.

==== Bishop of Youngstown ====
John Paul II appointed Tobin as bishop of Youngstown on December 5, 1995. He was installed on February 2, 1996.

In 1997, Tobin received an honorary doctorate from Saint Francis University.

==== Bishop of Providence ====
John Paul II appointed Tobin as bishop of Providence on March 31, 2005. He was installed on May 31, 2005. Tobin was a board member of Providence College in Providence and of Salve Regina University in Newport, Rhode Island.

Tobin wrote a column for his diocesan newspaper, Without a Doubt. These columns were published in two volumes: Without a Doubt: Bringing Faith to Life and Effective Faith: Faith that Makes a Difference. Tobin has been an avid Pittsburgh Steelers fan, and displayed a Steelers banner on his residence during each game day.

When the 2018 Pennsylvania Grand Jury Report on Sexual Abuse detailed sexual abuse in the Diocese of Pittsburgh during Tobin's tenure as auxiliary bishop, Tobin said he "became aware of incidents of sexual abuse when they were reported" but did not report them to local authorities or to parishioners. Tobin explained that he was "...not primarily responsible for clergy issues … Issues involving clergy were handled directly by the Diocesan Bishop with the assistance of the clergy office”. He also said that he carried out "other administrative duties such as budgets, property, diocesan staff, working with consultative groups".

=== Retirement and legacy ===
Pope Francis accepted Tobin's resignation as bishop of Providence on May 1, 2023.

== Views ==
=== Abortion ===
In November 2009, US Congressman Patrick J. Kennedy said Tobin told him not to take communion in the diocese because of his support for abortion rights for women. Tobin said he had written Kennedy in confidence in 2007 and never intended a public discussion, adding:

"At the same time, I will absolutely respond publicly and strongly whenever he attacks the Catholic Church, misrepresents the teachings of the Church, or issues inaccurate statements about my pastoral ministry."

In August 2013, Tobin announced that he had changed his party affiliation from Democratic to Republican, citing the Democratic Party's support for abortion rights as his primary motivation. In December 2013, he criticized Pope Francis on multiple occasions. After Francis reprimanded Catholics who "obsess" over abortion, Tobin, without mentioning Francis by name, called the abortion issue "a very important obsession". "It’s one thing for him to reach out and embrace and kiss little children," Tobin said. "It would also be wonderful if in a spiritual way he would reach out and embrace and kiss unborn children." He added that he was "a little disappointed in Pope Francis."

Many Rhode Island lawmakers criticized Tobin for his words, both on abortion and homosexuality, with one alleging that his tone was "not very Christian-like." Many publicly stated that they preferred Francis's less dogmatic approach. Tobin later defended himself, referring to his comments as "little concerns," adding that he had said "a lot of nice things" about Francis. On a separate occasion, he asked, "Is an ‘easy’ church, devoid of any moral imperatives or challenge, being faithful to its mission?"

=== LGBT rights ===
When US President Barack Obama announced his support for same-sex marriage, Tobin said it was "a sad day in American history". He stated that that voting for an abortion rights supporter, feminist, or pro-LGBTQ candidate was morally unacceptable. Tobin also stated:

... the Catholic Church has respect, love and pastoral concern for our brothers and sisters who have same-sex attraction. I sincerely pray for God’s blessings upon them, that they will enjoy much health, happiness and peace.... Our respect and pastoral care, however, does not mean that we are free to endorse or ignore immoral or destructive behavior, whenever or however it occurs. Indeed, as St. Paul urges us, we are required to “speak the truth in love.” (Eph 4:15). At this moment of cultural change, it is important to affirm the teaching of the Church, based on God’s word, that “homosexual acts are intrinsically disordered,” (Catechism of the Catholic Church, #2357) and always sinful. And because “same-sex marriages” are clearly contrary to God’s plan for the human family, and therefore objectively sinful, Catholics should examine their consciences very carefully before deciding whether or not to endorse same-sex relationships or attend same-sex ceremonies, realizing that to do so might harm their relationship with God and cause significant scandal to others.

On June 1, 2019, Tobin tweeted:

Catholics should not support or attend LGBTQ "Pride Month" events held in June. They promote a culture and encourage activities that are contrary to Catholic faith and morals. They are especially harmful for children.'

Tobin received both backlash and support for the tweet, and as reported by the Catholic News Agency and others, of the over 88,000 responses and comments, most were critical. After Motif Magazine in June 2019 published a critical open letter to Tobin in response to the tweet, the diocese withdrew permission for the State Theater Awards, hosted and sponsored by Motif, to be held at the church-owned McVinney Auditorium in Providence. The Boston Globe and The Providence Journal quoted a diocese spokesperson:

"Motif Magazine published and embraced an open letter which does not comply with our venue’s policies. McVinney Auditorium did not have a signed contract in place for this event and felt it in the best interest of both parties to not host the magazine’s award ceremony this year."

On August 12, 2020, Tobin suggested on Twitter that the Democratic presidential candidate Vice President Joe Biden, a confirmed Catholic who regularly attended mass, was not a true Catholic. On October 21, 2020, Tobin expressed opposition to civil unions for same-sex couples after a documentary claimed that Francis offered support for them. He said that it:

...clearly contradicts what has been the long-standing teaching of the Church. Individuals with same-sex attraction are beloved children of God and must have their personal human rights and civil rights recognized and protected by law. However, the legalization of their civil unions, which seek to simulate holy matrimony, is not admissible.

=== Social networks ===
After being a major Catholic influencer on various social media platforms for years, Tobin retired from most of them in October 2021. He has described social networks and Twitter in particular as an occasion of sin.

== See also ==
- Catholic Church in the United States
- Hierarchy of the Catholic Church
- Historical list of the Catholic bishops of the United States
- List of Catholic bishops of the United States
- Lists of popes, patriarchs, primates, archbishops, and bishops

Catholic Church titles
Preceded by –	Auxiliary Bishop of Pittsburgh; 1992–1995	Succeeded by –
Preceded by James William Malone	Bishop of Youngstown; 1996–2005	Succeeded by George Vance Murry, SJ
Preceded by Robert Edward Mulvee	Bishop of Providence; 2005–2023	Succeeded by Richard G. Henning
