= Robert Joseph Banks =

American Roman Catholic prelate (1928–2026)

The Most Reverend Robert Joseph Banks
- Bishop of Green Bay
- Diocese: Green Bay
- Appointed: October 16, 1990
- Installed: December 5, 1990
- Retired: October 10, 2003
- Predecessor: Adam Maida
- Successor: David Zubik
- Previous posts: Auxiliary Bishop of Boston, Titular Bishop of Taraqua (1985–1990)

Orders
- Ordination: December 20, 1952 by Luigi Traglia
- Consecration: September 19, 1985 by Bernard Francis Law, Daniel Anthony Cronin, John Aloysius Marshall

Personal details
- Born: February 26, 1928 Boston, Massachusetts, U.S.
- Died: January 25, 2026 (aged 97) Kaukauna, Wisconsin, U.S.
- Motto: "Blessed be God forever"
- Coat of arms

Styles of Robert Joseph Banks
- Reference style: His Excellency; The Most Reverend
- Spoken style: Your Excellency
- Religious style: Bishop

Robert Joseph Banks (February 26, 1928 – January 25, 2026) was an American prelate of the Roman Catholic Church, serving as bishop of the Diocese of Green Bay in Wisconsin from 1990 to 2003. He was previously an auxiliary bishop of the Archdiocese of Boston in Massachusetts from 1985 to 1990.

A protégé of Cardinal Bernard Law, Banks was questioned about his role in the sex abuse scandal in the Archdiocese of Boston in the early 2000s.

== Biography ==
=== Early life ===
Banks was born on February 26, 1928, in Boston, Massachusetts, to Robert and Rita (Sullivan) Banks. He attended primary school in the Winthrop School District in Winthrop, Massachusetts, then went to Cathedral High School and Saint John's Seminary, both in Boston.

Banks finished his studies for the priesthood at the Pontifical North American College and the Pontifical Gregorian University in Rome.

=== Priesthood ===
On December 20, 1952, Banks was ordained to the priesthood by Cardinal Luigi Traglia for the Archdiocese of Boston at the Archbasilica of Saint John Lateran in Rome. He received his Licentiate of Theology in 1953 and his Doctor of Canon Law degree from the Pontifical Lateran University in Rome in 1957.

After his ordination, Banks was an associate pastor in several parishes until 1959. From 1971 to 1981, he worked as a professor of canon law, academic dean, and rector at St. John Seminary. After leaving St. John Seminary, he served in parish ministry as vicar general and vicar for administration. In 1981, Banks was appointed parochial vicar of St. Mark's Parish in Dorchester, Massachusetts. In 1984, he was named as pastor of Sacred Heart Parish in Roslindale, Massachusetts.

=== Auxiliary Bishop of Boston ===
On July 26, 1985, Pope John Paul II appointed Banks as auxiliary bishop of Boston. He was consecrated by Cardinal Law on September 19, 1985, at the Cathedral of the Holy Cross in Boston. While auxiliary bishop, Banks also served as pastor at St. Mary's Parish in Dedham, Massachusetts.

In 1985 a doctor sent Banks a complaint about the Reverend Joseph E. Birmingham. The complaint stated that Birmingham had sexually abused a large number of boys during his assignments to various parishes, dating back to 1963. In court testimony on January 14, 2003, Banks was asked about how he tracked down Birmingham's victims. Banks' response was "I don't recall doing anything." Banks said that in 1987 he did not stop Birmingham's return as a parochial vicar to St. Brigid's Parish in Lexington, Massachusetts.

On February 2, 1990, Banks wrote a reference letter to the Diocese of San Bernardino in Southern California for the Reverend Paul Shanley, then a priest in the Archdiocese of Boston. Despite allegations in Massachusetts against Shanley of sexual abuse of minors, Banks wrote that Shanley was "a priest in good standing". Shanley was ultimately laicized and convicted of child abuse. In an interview years later, Banks denied knowing about any prior allegations against Shanley and said he could not remember checking his personnel file. However, in 1985, Banks did listen to a tape recording of Shanley at a public meeting in Rochester, New York. In the meeting, Shanley promoted sex between adults and children and said that children were typically the seducers in such relationships. When asked about that recording in court, Banks said he had forgotten about the recording when he wrote the 1990 reference letter to the Diocese of San Bernardino.

=== Bishop of Green Bay ===
On October 10, 1990, John Paul II appointed Banks as Bishop of Green Bay and titular bishop of Taraqua. The next day, Banks had to return to Boston for heart bypass surgery. Banks was a member of the committee on education of the United States Conference of Catholic Bishops (USCCB) from 1990 to 1993 and its chair from 1993 to 1996. In 1996, he became the USCCB's treasurer.

Banks was also chair of the National Catholic Education Association from 1998 to 2002. He was a member of the board of trustees for the Catholic University of America. He was on the Permanent Interdicasterial Commission for the Distribution of Priests. In 1998, Banks accompanied John Paul II on his visit to Cuba. He later returned to Cuba to meet with the Cuban bishops.

=== Later life and death ===
On February 26, 2003, Bank's 75th birthday, he submitted his letter of resignation as Bishop of Green Bay to Pope John Paul II. The pope accepted his resignation on October 10, 2003. After his retirement, Banks spent 2 1/2 years assisting at Holy Rosary Parish in Kewaunee, Wisconsin, and St. Mary Parish in Algoma, Wisconsin.

On January 25, 2026, Banks died at the age of 97.

== See also ==
- Catholic Church hierarchy
- Catholic Church in the United States
- Historical list of the Catholic bishops of the United States
- List of Catholic bishops of the United States
- Lists of patriarchs, archbishops, and bishops

Catholic Church titles
Preceded by –	Bishop Emeritus of Green Bay; 2003–2026	Succeeded by –
Preceded by Adam Maida	Bishop of Green Bay; 1990–2003	Succeeded by David Zubik
Preceded by Norbert Felix Gaughan	Titular Bishop of Taraqua; 1985–1990	Succeeded by John S. Knight
Preceded by –	Auxiliary Bishop of Boston; 1985–1990	Succeeded by –
