= Dattilo =

Dattilo is a surname. Notable people with the surname include:

- Bryan Dattilo (born 1971), American actor, brother of Kristin Dattilo
- Kristin Dattilo (born 1970), American actress
- Nicholas C. Dattilo (1932–2004), American Roman Catholic bishop
