= Mark Eckman =

US catholic bishop

The Most Reverend Mark Anthony Eckman
- Bishop of Pittsburgh
- Eckman visiting Our Lady of the Sacred Heart High School.
- Diocese: Pittsburgh
- Appointed: June 4, 2025
- Installed: July 14, 2025
- Predecessor: David Zubik
- Previous post: Auxiliary Bishop of Pittsburgh and Titular Bishop of Sitifis (2022-2025)

Orders
- Ordination: May 11, 1985 by Anthony Bevilacqua
- Consecration: January 11, 2022 by David Zubik, David Bonnar, and Edward J. Burns

Personal details
- Born: February 9, 1959 (age 67) Pittsburgh, Pennsylvania, US
- Education: Duquesne University; Saint Vincent Seminary
- Motto: To serve in faith and charity

Styles of Mark Anthony Eckman
- Reference style: His Excellency; The Most Reverend
- Spoken style: Your Excellency
- Religious style: Bishop

Coat of Arms as Auxiliary Bishop of Pittsburgh

Mark Anthony Eckman (born February 9, 1959) is an American Catholic prelate who has served as Bishop of Pittsburgh since 2025. He previously served as an auxiliary bishop of Pittsburgh (2022–2025).

== Biography ==
=== Early life ===
Mark Eckman was born on February 9, 1959, in Pittsburgh, Pennsylvania. He attended Saint Valentine Elementary School and South Hills Catholic High School in Mt. Lebanon, Pennsylvania.

After his high school graduation, Eckman entered Duquesne University in Pittsburgh, receiving a Bachelor of Arts degree in 1981. Deciding to become a priest, he continued his studies at Saint Vincent Seminary in Latrobe, Pennsylvania.

=== Priesthood ===
On May 11, 1985, Eckman was ordained to the priesthood for the Diocese of Pittsburgh by Archbishop Anthony Bevilacqua at St. Paul Cathedral in Pittsburgh, After his ordination in 1985, the diocese assigned Eckman as parochial vicar to Resurrection parish in Pittsburgh (1985 to 1990), Saint Sebastian in Ross Township (1990 to 1991), Saint Valentine in Bethel Park (1991 to 1992), Saint Winifred in Castle Shannon (1992 to 1994), and Saint John Vianney in Pittsburgh (1994 to 1998).

The diocese in 1998 placed Eckman as pastor at Saint Sylvester Parish in Pittsburgh, where he would serve for the next 11 years. In 2006, he also became pastor at St. Norbert Parish in Pittsburgh. In 2009, he was made pastor of Saint Thomas More Parish, remaining there until 2021. He was made episcopal vicar for clergy personnel in 2013.

=== Auxiliary Bishop of Pittsburgh ===
Eckman was named auxiliary bishop of Pittsburgh in 2021. On January 11, 2022, Eckman was consecrated by Bishop David Zubik at St. Paul Cathedral, with Bishops David Bonnar and Edward J. Burns serving as co-consecrators.

=== Bishop of Pittsburgh ===
On June 4, 2025, Eckman succeeded Zubik as the Bishop of Pittsburgh. He was installed as diocesan bishop on July 14, 2025, at Saint Paul Cathedral in Pittsburgh.

In a November 2025 letter, Eckman criticized immigration policies made during the second presidency of Donald Trump. While acknowledging "the right of a nation to enforce its laws and control its border," Eckman also described some forms of deportation as "cruel and inhumane."

== Episcopal succession ==
Catholic Church titles
Preceded by David Zubik	Bishop of Pittsburgh; 2025-Present	Succeeded by Incumbent
Preceded by -	Auxiliary Bishop of Pittsburgh; 2022-2025	Succeeded by -
