= David Morehouse =

American sports executive

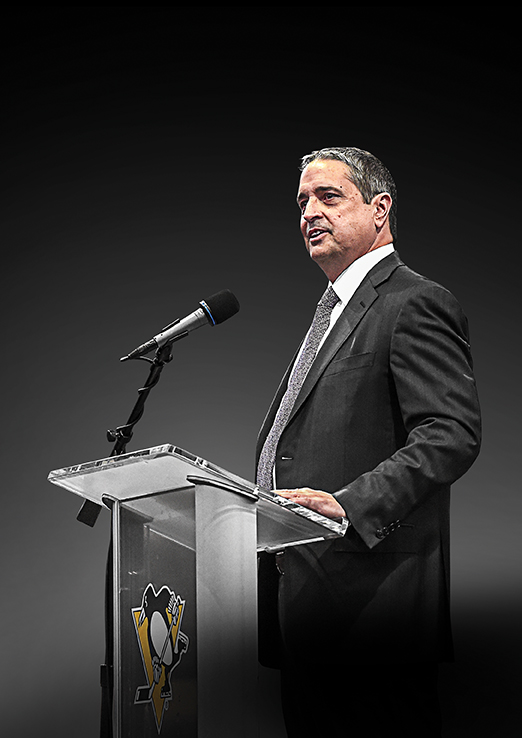
- Born: 1960 (age 65–66)
- Education: Community College of Allegheny County; Duquesne University; John F. Kennedy School of Government at Harvard University
- Known for: President and CEO of Pittsburgh Penguins

David Morehouse (born 1960) is an American businessman and former president and chief executive officer of Pittsburgh Penguins of the National Hockey League. During his tenure, the Penguins won three Stanley Cups (2009, 2016, 2017), reached four Stanley Cup Finals, and sold out every game for 14 seasons. Prior to his career with the Penguins, Morehouse served in politics as a member of the Clinton administration and worked on the presidential campaigns of Al Gore in 2000 and John Kerry in 2004.

== Biography ==
Morehouse grew up in the Beechview neighborhood of Pittsburgh. He graduated from South Hills Catholic High School in 1978. He did not attend college immediately, working as a union boilermaker until a construction-site injury changed his outlook and career path. He enrolled at the Community College of Allegheny County, earned an associate degree in general studies and attended Duquesne University while working for the Allegheny County Register of Wills. In 1992, he volunteered to work on Bill Clinton's presidential campaign when it made its way through Pittsburgh, leading to a 12-year career in politics.

== Political career ==
Morehouse started as a volunteer motorcade driver for Bill Clinton's 1992 campaign and later hired as a paid member of the advance team, arranging crowds for Clinton's speeches. When Clinton won the election, Morehouse was named to the inauguration committee. That led to full-time work in the legislative affairs department at the Pentagon and a stint at the White House as deputy director of advance, coordinating advance operations for the President and First Lady. He later worked as communications director for Office of National Drug Control Policy Director Lee Brown; as director of strategic planning for retired U.S. Army general Barry McCaffrey at the Office of National Drug Control Policy; and as deputy director of D.A.R.E. Morehouse also went back to school, earning a master's degree in public administration from Harvard's John F. Kennedy School of Government.

== Presidential campaigns ==
Vice President Al Gore tapped Morehouse as senior advisor and trip director for his 2000 presidential campaign. On election night, when campaign officials heard about disputed returns from Florida, it was Morehouse who was assigned to physically prevent Gore from going on stage to concede at Nashville's War Memorial. That scene is recounted in the 2008 HBO film Recount. Four years later, Morehouse joined Senator John Kerry's 2004 presidential campaign, working first in communications and becoming traveling chief of staff. He was responsible for day-to-day management of the road campaign and was named senior campaign representative during debate preparations and negotiations.

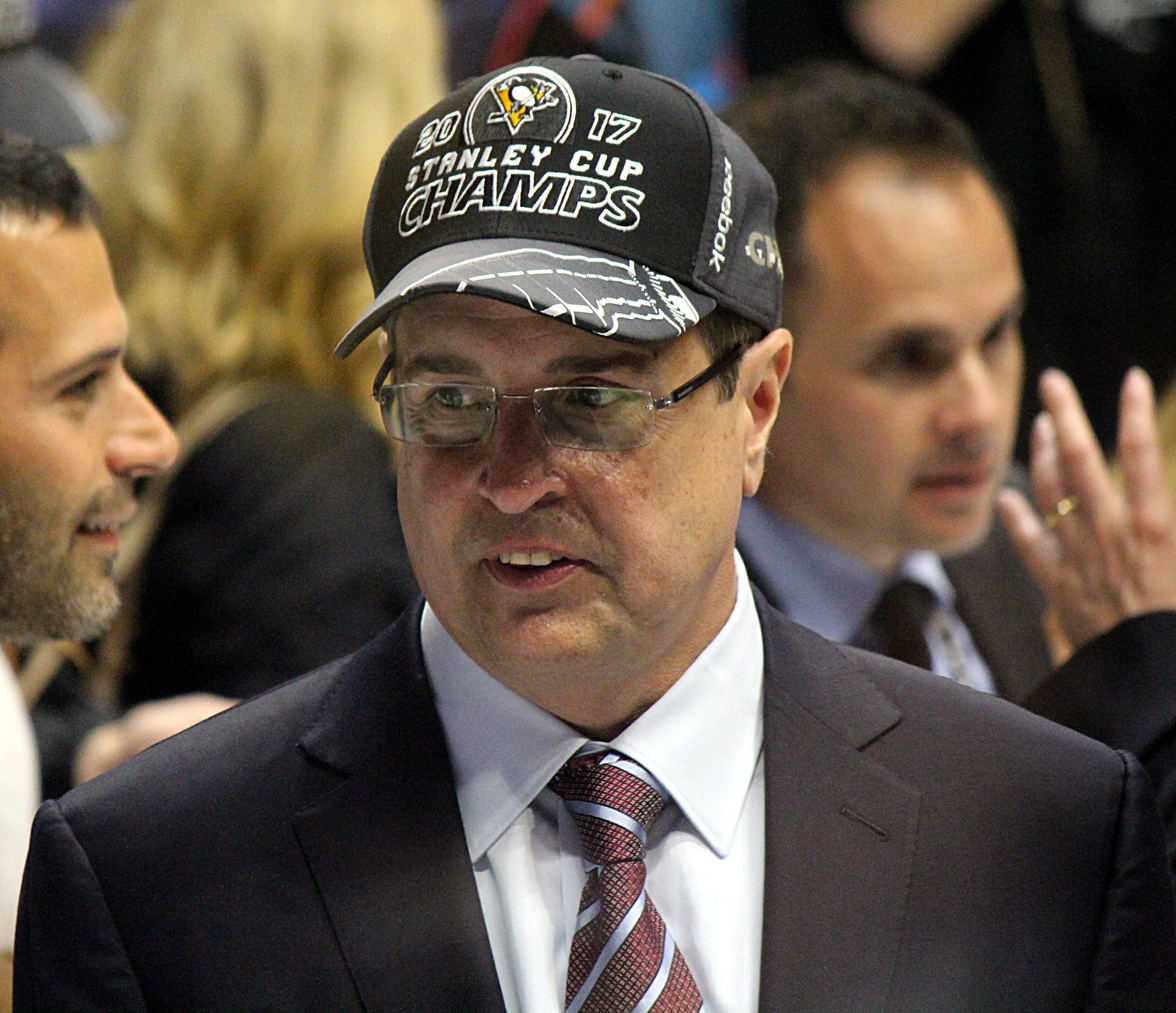
Morehouse following the Penguins Stanley Cup win in 2017.

== Sports management ==
Morehouse expected to transition to a career in consulting work after Kerry lost the election, but a new opportunity arose in his hometown of Pittsburgh. Ron Burkle, a co-owner of the NHL's Pittsburgh Penguins, was also a prominent Democratic donor and knew Morehouse from the campaign trail. Burkle hired him in a temporary role as senior consultant to help with the team's struggling bid for a new arena.

Morehouse succeeded in that task, and, as a consequence, was added to the Penguins' senior management team by Burkle and co-owner Mario Lemieux. Morehouse was named team president in 2007 and added the CEO duties in 2010, when the new arena (then CONSOL Energy Center, now PPG Paints Arena) opened its doors.

Morehouse immediately commissioned a brand study, reshaped the Penguins' strategic vision, and added an emphasis on youth hockey development. With a roster led by Sidney Crosby and Evgeni Malkin, the team has sold out every game since February 2007. Morehouse’s marketing ideas included a free pre-season game for kids, consisting of 18,000 free tickets, and an annual event where Penguins players personally deliver season tickets to fans' homes.

Morehouse stepped down as CEO of the Penguins in April 2022, and was then hired to be the Pittsburgh Steelers' Senior Advisor to the President, focusing on "community and League-related initiatives."

== Personal life ==
Morehouse and his wife, Vanessa, reside in the Pittsburgh neighborhood of Shadyside. They have four children.

He received the Art Rooney Award for leadership and contributions to the Greater Pittsburgh Region in 2017 and an honorary doctorate in business leadership from Duquesne University in 2018. He also is a member of the board of directors of Allegheny Technologies Incorporated (ATI), where he serves on the audit and technology committees.
