= Donald Wuerl =

American cardinal (born 1940)

His Eminence Donald Wuerl
- Cardinal, Archbishop Emeritus of Washington
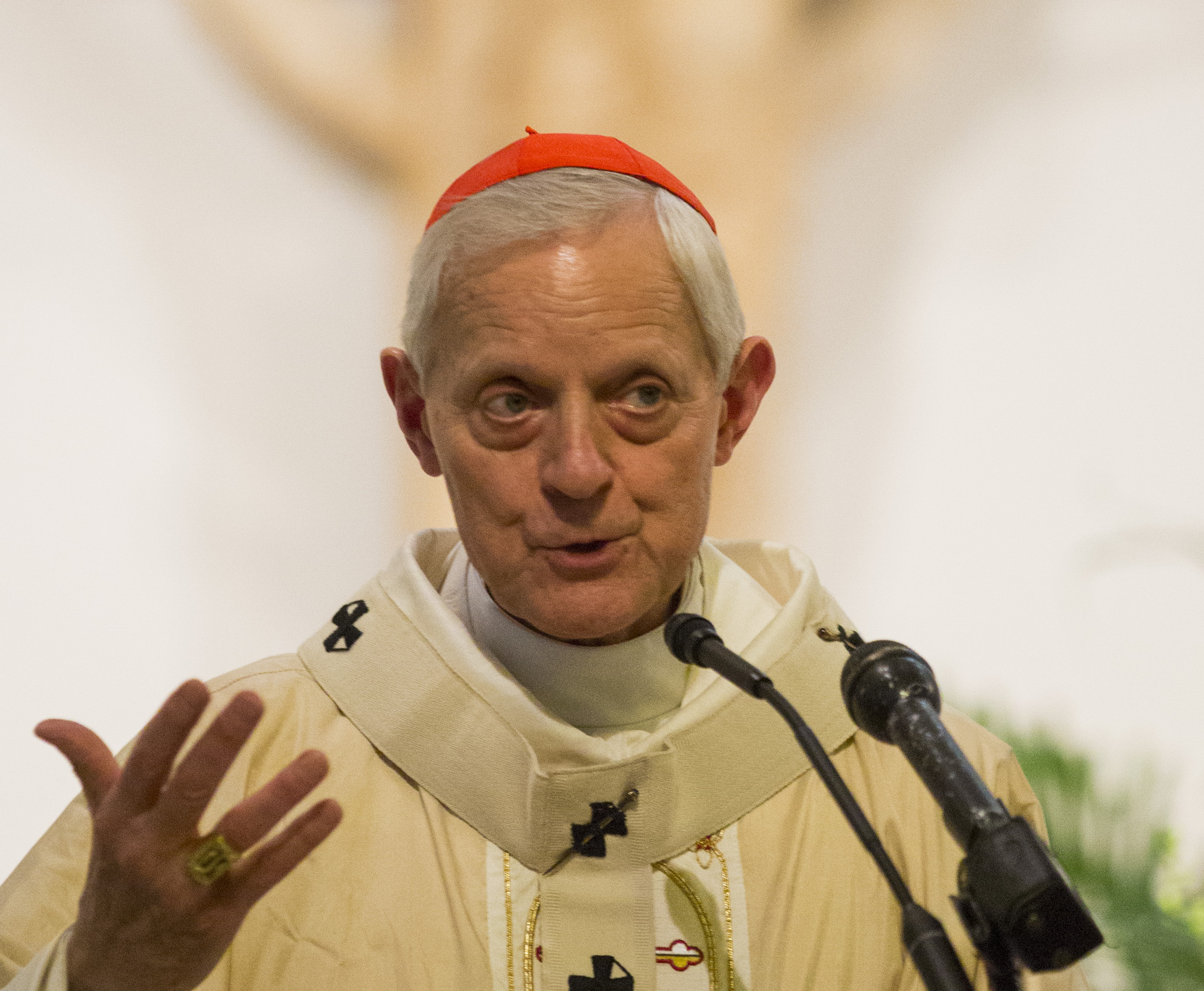
- Wuerl in 2015
- Archdiocese: Washington
- Appointed: May 16, 2006
- Installed: June 22, 2006
- Retired: October 12, 2018
- Predecessor: Theodore McCarrick
- Successor: Wilton Daniel Gregory
- Other post: Cardinal-Priest of San Pietro in Vincoli (2010–)
- Previous posts: Bishop of Pittsburgh (1988–2006); Auxiliary Bishop of Seattle and Titular Bishop of Rossmarkaeum (1986–1988)

Orders
- Ordination: December 17, 1966 by Francis Frederick Reh
- Consecration: January 6, 1986 by John Paul II, Agostino Casaroli, and Bernardin Gantin
- Created cardinal: November 20, 2010 by Benedict XVI
- Rank: Cardinal-Priest

Personal details
- Born: Donald William Wuerl; November 12, 1940 (age 86) Pittsburgh, Pennsylvania, U.S.
- Denomination: Catholic Church
- Motto: Thy kingdom come

Styles of Donald Wuerl
- Reference style: His Eminence; The Most Reverend Eminence
- Spoken style: Your Eminence
- Religious style: Cardinal
- Informal style: Cardinal

Ordination history of Donald Wuerl
History
Episcopal consecration
- Consecrated by: John Paul II
- Date: January 6, 1986
Episcopal succession
Bishops consecrated by Donald Wuerl as principal consecrator
- William J. Winter: February 13, 1989
- Thomas Joseph Tobin: December 27, 1992
- David Zubik: April 6, 1997
- Paul J. Bradley: February 2, 2005
- Herbert Bevard: September 3, 2008
- Barry Christopher Knestout: December 29, 2008
- Mario E. Dorsonville: April 20, 2015
- Roy Edward Campbell: April 21, 2017

Donald William Wuerl (born November 12, 1940) is an American Catholic prelate who served as Archbishop of Washington from 2006 to 2018. He previously served as auxiliary bishop of the Archdiocese of Seattle (1986 to 1987) and Bishop of Pittsburgh (1988 to 2006). Pope Benedict XVI made him a cardinal in 2010.

Wuerl is widely viewed as a theological moderate and is well known in the church for his ability to forge consensus between different factions. Questions arose in 2018 of whether Wuerl had adequately dealt with allegations of sexual abuse against clergy under his jurisdiction. A 2018 Pennsylvania grand jury report criticized how he handled sexual abuse cases during his time as bishop in Pittsburgh. Wuerl has denied mishandling the cases.

There were additional accusations that Wuerl, despite initially denying it, was aware of sexual abuse accusations against former cardinal Theodore McCarrick, his predecessor in Washington. On October 12, 2018, Pope Francis accepted Wuerl's resignation as Archbishop of Washington. Wuerl remained in charge of the archdiocese as its apostolic administrator until Francis appointed his successor, Wilton Daniel Gregory, in 2019.

== Early life and education ==
Wuerl was born on November 12, 1940, in Pittsburgh, Pennsylvania. He was the second of four children of Francis and Mary Anna (née Schiffauer) Wuerl. He has two brothers, Wayne and Dennis, and a sister, Carol. Wuerl's father worked nights weighing freight cars for the Pennsylvania Railroad, and served in the US Navy during World War II. His mother died in 1944, and his father married Kathryn Cavanaugh in 1946. Wuerl expressed an interest in becoming a priest early in life. He even held pretend Masses for his brothers and sisters at home.

Wuerl received his early education at the parochial school of St. Mary of the Mount Parish in the Mount Washington neighborhood of Pittsburgh, graduating in 1958. He attended Saint Gregory Seminary in Cincinnati, Ohio, for his freshman and sophomore years of college from September 1958 through May 1960. He then attended the Catholic University of America in Washington, D.C., where he was a Basselin Scholar at the Theological College. Wuerl earned a bachelor's degree in philosophy in 1962 and a master's degree in 1963.

Wuerl continued his studies at the Pontifical North American College in Rome. He earned a Master of Theology degree from the Pontifical Gregorian University in 1967. While a student in Rome, he was able to observe the proceedings of the Second Vatican Council.

=== Early career ===
Wuerl was ordained a priest for the Diocese of Pittsburgh on December 17, 1966, by Bishop Francis Frederick Reh. After his ordination, Wuerl was assigned as assistant pastor at St. Rosalia Parish in Pittsburgh's Greenfield neighborhood and as priest-secretary to Bishop John Wright.

After Wright was elevated to cardinal in 1969, Wuerl became his full-time priest-secretary in Vatican City from 1969 until Wright died in 1979. While in Rome. Wuerl attended the Pontifical University of St. Thomas Aquinas Angelicum where he obtained a Doctor of Sacred Theology degree in 1974.

Because Wright was recovering from surgery and used a wheelchair, Wuerl, as Wright's priest-secretary, was one of three non-cardinals permitted inside the papal conclave that selected Karol Wojtyla as Pope John Paul II in 1978. (Wright had missed the first of the two 1978 conclaves.)

In 1976, Wuerl co-wrote with Thomas Comerford Lawler and Ronald David Lawler a catechism for adults, The Teaching of Christ. It has been reprinted several times and has been widely translated.

Wuerl served as rector at Saint Paul Seminary in Pittsburgh from 1981 to 1985. In 1982, he was appointed executive secretary to Bishop John Aloysius Marshall of Burlington, Vermont, who was leading a Vatican-mandated study of US seminaries.

== Episcopal career ==
=== Auxiliary Bishop of Seattle ===
On December 3, 1985, Wuerl was appointed titular bishop of Rosemarkie and as an auxiliary bishop of Seattle by Pope John Paul II. He was consecrated as a bishop on January 6, 1986, at St. Peter's Basilica in Rome by the pope.

As auxiliary bishop, Wuerl and Seattle's Archbishop Raymond Hunthausen worked in adjoining offices without conflict for several months. However, in May 1986, the two men found themselves with opposing positions on proposed state legislation to prohibit discrimination based on sexual orientation in employment. At that point, Hunthausen learned for the first time that the Vatican had charged Wuerl with responsibility — "complete and final decision-making power" — for several key areas normally within the archbishop's control: worship and liturgy, the archdiocesan tribunal, which considers requests for marriage annulment, seminarians, priestly formation and laicized priests, moral issues, and health care and ministry to LGBTQ people.

Hunthausen revealed the division of authority between him and Wuerl in September 1986. While some chancery officials expressed support for Wuerl, some questioned his role and saw little impact on the archdiocese a year after his appointment. In November, the US Conference of Catholic Bishops expressed its objections to the Vatican's restrictions on Hunthausen.

In February 1987, the Vatican formed a commission of US bishops, headed by Cardinal Joseph Bernardin, to investigate the situation between Wuerl and Hunthausen in Seattle. Wuerl met privately with John Paul II, but declined to comment on the meeting, saying, "I'm just going to wait and see what the commission does." In May 1987, following the commission review, John Paul II restored Hunthausen's full authority as bishop and appointed Bishop Thomas Joseph Murphy as coadjutor bishop to assist him.

Wuerl resigned as auxiliary bishop of Seattle on May 26, 1987. He later said that remaining in Seattle became "unworkable", with many parishioners blaming him for the conflict with Hunthausen. Wuerl moved to a Pittsburgh suburb to await his next appointment by the Vatican. Wuerl and Hunthausen eventually became friends, with Wuerl saying that Hunthausen taught him a great deal about the work of being a bishop.

=== Bishop of Pittsburgh ===
Wuerl was appointed as the eleventh bishop of Pittsburgh on February 12, 1988, by John Paul II. He was installed on March 25, 1988. One of the biggest problems facing the diocese was the financial losses of its parish schools. The diocese had built many parishes during the era when Catholic immigrants were swelling the population of Pittsburgh to work in the steel mills. It established the parishes along ethnic lines so that parishioners could attend services in their native languages and maintain their national traditions. This resulted in the diocese having as many as eight parishes within blocks of each other. After World War II, the diocese made a major effort to build a school for every parish. These schools were usually staffed by nuns who received nominal compensation.

The economics of the Pittsburgh Catholic schools began to break down in the 1970s. First, the Baby Boom period had subsided, resulting in a reduction in the student population. Second, Catholics became less likely to send their children to Catholic schools. Third, in response to the Second Vatican Council, many sisters began choosing missions unrelated to education. To replace these nuns in schools, the diocese had to hire more lay teachers with higher salaries.

Wuerl asked his committee of lay advisors to address the debt and deficit spending associated with Catholic education in Pittsburgh. In 1988, the committee determined that 48 of 333 parishes owed a total of $5.6 million. The diocese announced a rescue plan in February 1989, with the diocese forgiving $1.1 million loaned to the parishes for insurance along with the Parish Share Program. In addition, the diocese promised low-interest loans to parishes to refinance their other obligations. Despite the financial condition of the diocese, Wuerl decided to expand its health services. He worked with hospitals and community groups to create a group home for people with HIV/AIDS. In 2003, Wuerl conducted a $2.5 million fundraising campaign to create the Catholic Charities Free Health Care Center, serving the uninsured working poor.

In 1989, Wuerl merged Sacred Heart and St. Paul Cathedral High Schools to establish Oakland Catholic High School, using the St. Paul building in the Oakland neighborhood of Pittsburgh .

Wuerl launched and hosted a television program, The Teaching of Christ, in 1990. He taught at Duquesne University in Pittsburgh as a distinguished service professor. Wuerl in 1999 became a chaplain for the Order of Malta, Federal Association USA, attached to the Sovereign Military Order of Malta. Wuerl also wrote regular columns in Columbia, the major publication of the Knights of Columbus in the United States.

In March 1994, Wuerl closed 73 diocesan buildings, including 37 churches, and reduced the number of parishes from 331 by 117 through mergers. The diocese was operating 214 parishes when Wuerl left in June 2006 to become archbishop of Washington. Wuerl's plan, The Parish Reorganization and Revitalization Project, was used as a model for other dioceses seeking parish suppression.

From 1994 until 2003, as bishop of Pittsburgh, Wuerl served as a member of the board of governors of the Pontifical North American College in Rome (chair, 1998 to 1999), representing the Pennsylvania-New Jersey Region (Region III) of the USCCB. In 2008, as archbishop of Washington, he was again elected to the college's board of governors, this time representing the Washington, D.C., Delaware, Maryland, Virginia, and West Virginia region of the conference (Region IV).

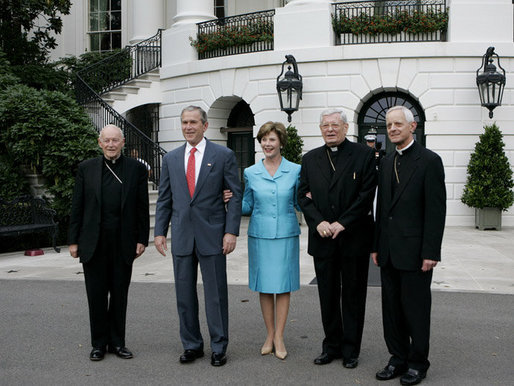
President Bush and wife Laura with former Archbishop McCarrick (left) and Archbishop Wuerl (right), welcome papal nuncio Pietro Sambi to the White House (2006)

Under Wuerl, the diocese began to emphasize placing women into positions of responsibility and authority. Rosemarie Cibik, a former superintendent of public instruction, was appointed as the first lay superintendent of Catholic schools in Pittsburgh. Rita Joyce, a canon and civil lawyer, became the first lay member of the diocesan marriage tribunal. Sister Margaret Hannan was appointed as associate general secretary of the diocese. She later became chancellor, the highest canonical post that a lay person can hold.

=== Archbishop of Washington ===
Pope Benedict XVI appointed Wuerl as archbishop of Washington on May 16, 2006. He was installed on June 22, 2006, at the Basilica of the National Shrine of the Immaculate Conception in Washington, D.C. and received the pallium from Pope Benedict XVI on June 29, 2006. In April 2008, Wuerl hosted the apostolic visit of Benedict XVI to the District of Columbia.

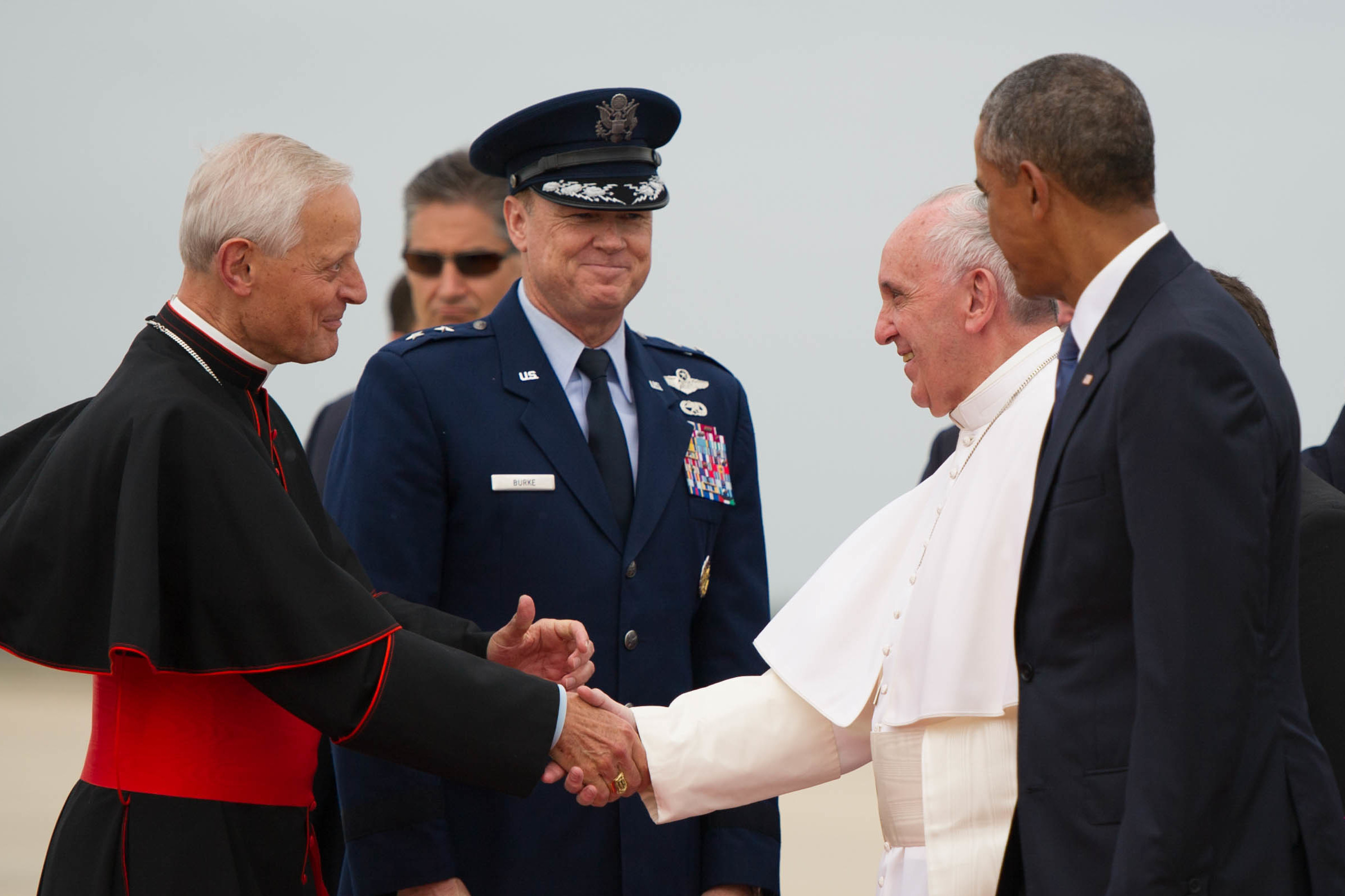
Cardinal Wuerl and President Obama welcome Pope Francis to United States (2015)

Wuerl served as chair of the board of directors of the National Catholic Educational Association starting on December 12, 2005, and was also chancellor of The Catholic University of America. In September 2010, the Congregation for the Doctrine of the Faith named Wuerl as its delegate in the United States for facilitating the implementation of the apostolic constitution Anglicanorum coetibus. The constitution was issued by Benedict XVI in November 2009 for Anglicans who wished to convert to Catholicism. Wuerl also headed the US Conference of Catholic Bishops (USCCB) ad hoc committee to support that implementation.

=== Cardinal ===
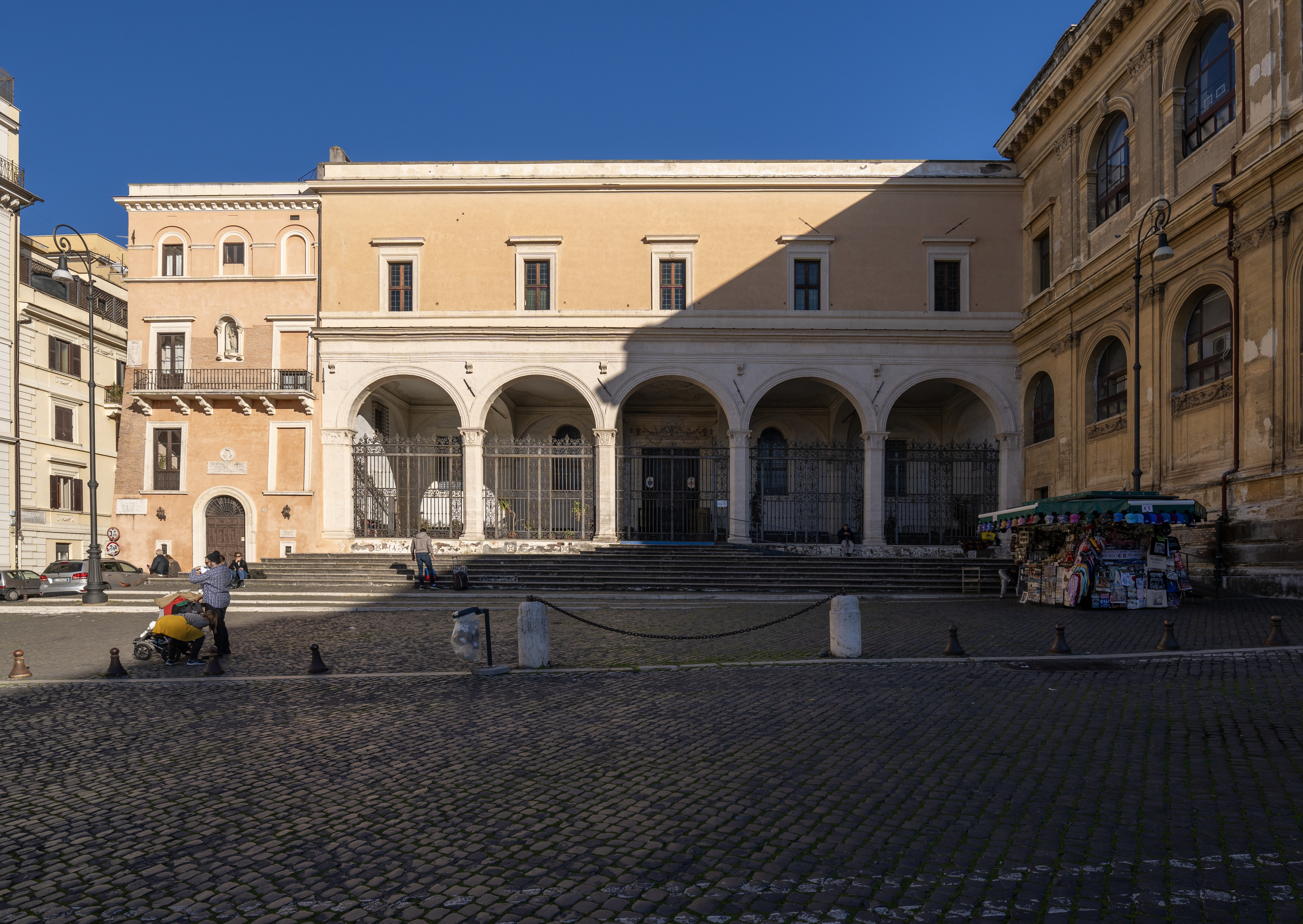
San Pietro in Vincoli, Rome, Italy (2023)

On November 20, 2010, Benedict XVI elevated Wuerl to the College of Cardinals in a public consistory held at Saint Peter's Basilica in Vatican City. He was created Cardinal-Priest of S. Pietro in Vincoli. Benedict XVI later appointed Wuerl to the following posts:

- Member of the Congregation for the Clergy and the Pontifical Council for Promoting Christian Unity (December 2010)
- Relator-general (recording secretary) of the 2012 World Synod of Bishops meeting on the New Evangelization (October 24, 2011)
- Member of the Pontifical Council for Culture for a five-year renewable term (December 10, 2011)
- Member of the Congregation for the Doctrine of the Faith (April 21, 2012)

In 2011, Wuerl served on a committee of the US Conference of Catholic Bishops that criticized the American Catholic theologian Elizabeth Johnson. The bishops stated that her popular 2007 book, Quest for the Living God, contravened Catholic doctrine in several areas. The committee itself faced criticism for not following accepted protocols for dealing with conflicts with theologians. Wuerl later stated that he had offered to meet with Johnson regarding the book, but she did not respond to his invitations.

Wuerl was a cardinal elector who participated in the 2013 papal conclave that elected Pope Francis. Francis appointed Wuerl to the Congregation for Bishops (December 16, 2013).

=== United States Conference of Catholic Bishops ===
Wuerl is said to have worked as a consensus builder on ideological conflicts over issues such as liturgical translation and communion for politicians favoring abortion rights for women during the 1990s and 2000s. Wuerl was a supporter of the Charter for the Protection of Children and Young People by the USCCB. The charter required that any clergyman who sexually abuses a child never again serve in ministry.

== Public positions ==
Reverend Thomas J. Reese, a Jesuit priest and journalist, said in 2006 that "[Wuerl is] quite orthodox theologically, but he doesn't like to play cop; he's not an authoritarian person." In August 2018, Reese described him as an ideological moderate with regard to Catholic theological disputes, stating, "He's not an old leftie, he's not a right-wing culture warrior. ... He was totally enthusiastic about John Paul II, and then Pope Benedict, and now he's totally enthusiastic about Pope Francis. There are not many people in the church who are totally enthusiastic about all three of them."

Journalist John L. Allen Jr. in December 2018 said that Wuerl "was able to forge behind-the-scenes consensus because he was trusted by virtually all parties as someone who wouldn't embarrass them in public, and because he was seen as at least somewhat sympathetic to their points of view."

=== Religion and politics ===
In cases where politicians and officeholders take policy positions that clash with church doctrine, Wuerl said the decision to offer communion should be made case-by-case:

"Our primary job is to teach and try to convince people. The tradition in our country has not been in the direction of refusing Communion, and I think it's served us well."

=== LGBTQ rights ===
In 2009, the Council of the District of Columbia began consideration of a bill giving certain rights to individuals in same-sex marriages. The archdiocese pressed the council to include religious liberty provisions to protect the archdiocese's ability to provide social services (e.g. adoption services) in accordance with Catholic teaching on marriage. On November 12, 2009, the Washington Post characterized the archdiocese as delivering an "ultimatum" to the city. An article the same day in The New York Times characterized the archdiocese as making a "threat". In a November 22 reply to the Post, Wuerl stated that there was

"...no threat or ultimatum to end services, just a simple recognition that the new requirements by the city for religious organizations to recognize same-sex marriages in their policies could restrict our ability to provide the same level of services as we do now."

On November 26, 2009, Wuerl signed an ecumenical statement, known as the Manhattan Declaration, calling on evangelicals, Catholics, and Eastern Orthodox Christians not to comply with rules and laws permitting abortion, same-sex marriage, and other practices that contravene their religious consciences.

In December 2009, on the day that the council passed the same-sex marriage bill, Joe Solmonese, president of the Human Rights Campaign, a same-sex marriage advocacy organization, wrote that Wuerl had "refused to alter his official position" to reduce social services in the archdiocese. On the same day, the archdiocese, though expressing its view that the bill did not adequately protect religious liberty, nonetheless affirmed its commitment to serving the needs of the poor and its hope for "working in partnership with the District of Columbia consistent with the mission of the Catholic Church."

In February 2010, shortly before the law took effect, Catholic Charities of the Archdiocese of Washington ended its foster care and public adoption programs rather than comply with the law's requirement that it license same-sex couples for the program. The agency also modified its employee health care benefits to avoid having to extend coverage to same-sex couples.

=== Response to Dominus Iesus ===
In 2000, the Vatican issued a document entitled Dominus Iesus, which stated that Jesus Christ is the only way to salvation. Wuerl said the document was aimed at some theologians in Asia who were attempting to incorporate Hindu, Islamic, and Buddhist tenets into the Catholic interpretation of the Gospels. Wuerl said that Dominus Iesus defended the Catholic view of the necessity of proclaiming the Christian faith to everyone. However, he stated that document acknowledged that there are elements in non-Christian scriptures "by which countless people throughout the centuries have been and still are able today to nourish and maintain their life-relationship with God."

=== Response to Summorum pontificum ===
In 2007, Benedict XVI issued the motu proprio Summorum Pontificum (2007), which authorized priests to celebrate mass using either the 1969 or 1962 editions of the Roman Missal. Wuerl commented that the pope was "trying to reach out pastorally to those who feel an attraction to this form of the liturgy, and he is asking the pastors to be aware of and support their interest". He added that about 500 people a week were attending celebrations of the Tridentine Mass at three churches in his archdiocese.

Wuerl established a special committee "to assist pastors in evaluating and responding to requests for the regular and public celebration" of the 1962 form of Mass. As of 2017, the Tridentine Mass was reported on the archdiocesan website as celebrated weekly in three parishes, the same ones as in 2007.

== Sexual abuse cases ==
In 2003, journalist Ann Rodgers-Melnick wrote in the Pittsburgh Post-Gazette that Wuerl was being proactive as bishop in confronting sexual abuse allegations against clergy. Wuerl won both praise and criticism for his efforts to remove sexually abusive clergy years before other church leaders made similar efforts. However, the Pennsylvania grand jury investigation report released in August 2018 criticized Wuerl for his handling of some sexual abuse cases.

=== 1988 to 2018 ===
In September 1988, when Wuerl was the bishop of Pittsburgh, he accepted a dinner invitation from a family suing the diocese for sexual abuse by a priest. Although the diocese's lawyers had discouraged him from going, Wuerl wanted to make contact with the family. Wuerl later settled the lawsuit, and the priest involved was laicized and eventually imprisoned. Wuerl told his staff that in cases of alleged sexual abuse, their first concern should be for the victim, the second for the victim's family, and the third the reputation of the Church.

In 1978, Anthony Cipolla was charged with the sexual abuse of a nine-year-old boy; his mother later dropped the criminal charges, claiming that Bishop Vincent Leonard pressured her to do it. In 1988, another victim claimed that Cipolla abused him from 1981 to 1986; the diocese settled the case in 1993, over Cipolla's objections. Cipolla consistently said that he never abused anyone.

In 1988, Wuerl removed Cipolla from public ministry; Cipolla appealed this action to the Supreme Tribunal of the Apostolic Signatura, the Vatican's highest court, which ordered Wuerl to return him to ministry. Wuerl then asked the court to reconsider the case, saying that its decision showed a lack of awareness of the civil lawsuit against Cipolla and Cipolla's 1978 arrest. The court reversed its ruling in 1995 and upheld Wuerl's suspension of Cipolla's. Cipolla nonetheless continued to minister to the public, forcing the diocese to publicly state that Cipolla was not in good standing. In 2002, Cipolla was laicized by the pope.

In 2010, Wuerl argued that the American Catholic Church had made progress in confronting abusers. He told Fox News Sunday that "we have succeeded in guaranteeing that if a priest is accused, and there is a credible allegation, he is simply removed from the ministry. That is reported to the authorities, and we begin to try to heal whatever was damaged in that abuse."

=== 2018 grand jury report ===
On August 14, 2018, a grand jury report on sexual abuse within the Catholic Church, released by Pennsylvania Attorney General Josh Shapiro, criticized Wuerl's handling of sexual abuse cases as bishop of Pittsburgh. On the advice of doctors, Wuerl allowed William O'Malley to return to active ministry in 1998, despite past allegations of abuse. O'Malley had admitted that he was sexually interested in adolescents. George Zirwas had a long history of involvement in child sexual abuse, sometimes including sadism. He had also manufactured child pornography. Zirwas' actions were known in the diocese as early as 1987, but he continued in ministry when Wuerl became bishop of Pittsburgh in 1988. In 1989, Wuerl authorized a $900,000 settlement, with confidentiality clauses, with two of Zirwas' victims, but allowed Zirwas to remain in ministry despite further complaints. After the diocese received another complaint, Wuerl finally removed Zirwas from ministry in 1996. Eventually, Zirwas moved to Cuba, where he was murdered in 2001. Reverend Ernest Paone had a history of sexual abuse allegations against him and was frequently moved to different parishes across the United States. In 1991, Wuerl allowed Paone to be transferred to the Diocese of Reno-Las Vegas, despite being aware of the reports surrounding his behavior and his history of accusations of child abuse dating back to the early 1960s. A new complaint arose against Paone in 1994. According to the report:

Wuerl responded by dispatching letters notifying the relevant California and Nevada Dioceses of the 1994 complaint. However, Wuerl did not report the more detailed information contained within the Diocesan records. The Diocese did not recall Paone; nor did it suspend his faculties as a priest. To the contrary, Paone continued to have the support of the Diocese.

The grand jury report did note Wuerl's contributions to fighting sex abuse. That included his successful effort within the Vatican legal system to remove Cipolla from ministry for sexual abuse.

==== Reactions to report ====
Wuerl disputed the allegations against him in the grand jury report, stating: "While I understand this report may be critical of some of my actions, I believe the report confirms that I acted with diligence, with concern for the victims and to prevent future acts of abuse." Shapiro disagreed with Wuerl's conclusions, saying,

Cardinal Wuerl is not telling the truth. Many of his statements in response to the Grand Jury Report are directly contradicted by the Church's own documents and records from their Secret Archives. Offering misleading statements now only furthers the cover up.

Wuerl launched a website, "The Wuerl Record," containing a defense of his record during that era. Wuerl further faced "intense scrutiny" regarding his handling of sex abuse cases in the Diocese of Pittsburgh. A spokesman for the Archdiocese of Washington in August 2018 said Wuerl "has no intention of resigning."

On August 20, 2018, Ave Maria Press announced it had indefinitely postponed the release of a book written by Wuerl titled What Do You Want to Know? A Pastor's Response to the Most Challenging Questions About the Catholic Faith. By August 2018, thousands of people in the Diocese of Pittsburgh had signed a petition to rename Cardinal Wuerl North Catholic High School. On Wuerl's own request, the school and the diocesan school board petitioned Pittsburgh Bishop David Zubik to change the school name. Zubik approved the change on August 22 and the school became simply North Catholic High School. In response to the allegations against Wuerl, political commentator Hugh Hewitt demanded that Wuerl be dismissed as archbishop of Washington and resign from the College of Cardinals. In a few days, 60,000 people signed a petition to Pope Francis to remove Wuerl. In what CNN called a "growing Catholic insurgency," Wuerl faced more calls for his resignation, including from a priest in his archdiocese and many laymen across ideological lines.

At the end of August 2018, Wuerl flew to Rome to meet with Pope Francis. The pope instructed Wuerl to confer with the priests of the archdiocese regarding his next steps. On September 3, Wuerl met with more than a hundred priests in Washington. He told them he knew nothing about the allegations against McCarrick until they became public. Many priests in attendance offered their views; some encouraged Wuerl to resign while others encouraged him to "stay and be part of the church's healing process." On September 8, 2018, Deacon James Garcia, the master of ceremonies at St. Matthew's Cathedral in Washington, informed Wuerl that he was refusing to serve him at mass any longer, due to Wuerl's handling of sexual abuse cases, and asked him to resign. Garcia also denied that this refusal to serve with Wuerl violated his vow of obedience to Wuerl as his bishop.

Columnist Michael Sean Winters in October 2018 defended Wuerl's actions while bishop, but said Wuerl's response to the grand jury report could hardly have been worse. Winters described the report as "spotty and inconsistent." Winters criticized the media response to the report and said that it was weaponized by far-right groups such as Church Militant and LifeSiteNews in order to take down Wuerl and attack Pope Francis.

Former New York Times reporter Peter Steinfels in January 2019 called the grand jury report "grossly misleading, irresponsible, inaccurate, and unjust". Steinfels noted that a third or more of the accusations were revealed after the Dallas Charter and claimed that such "inaccurate and incomplete" reports were used to push Wuerl out of office. Steinfels accused Shapiro of engineering the report in order to discredit church opposition.

=== Alleged sexual abuse by Theodore McCarrick ===
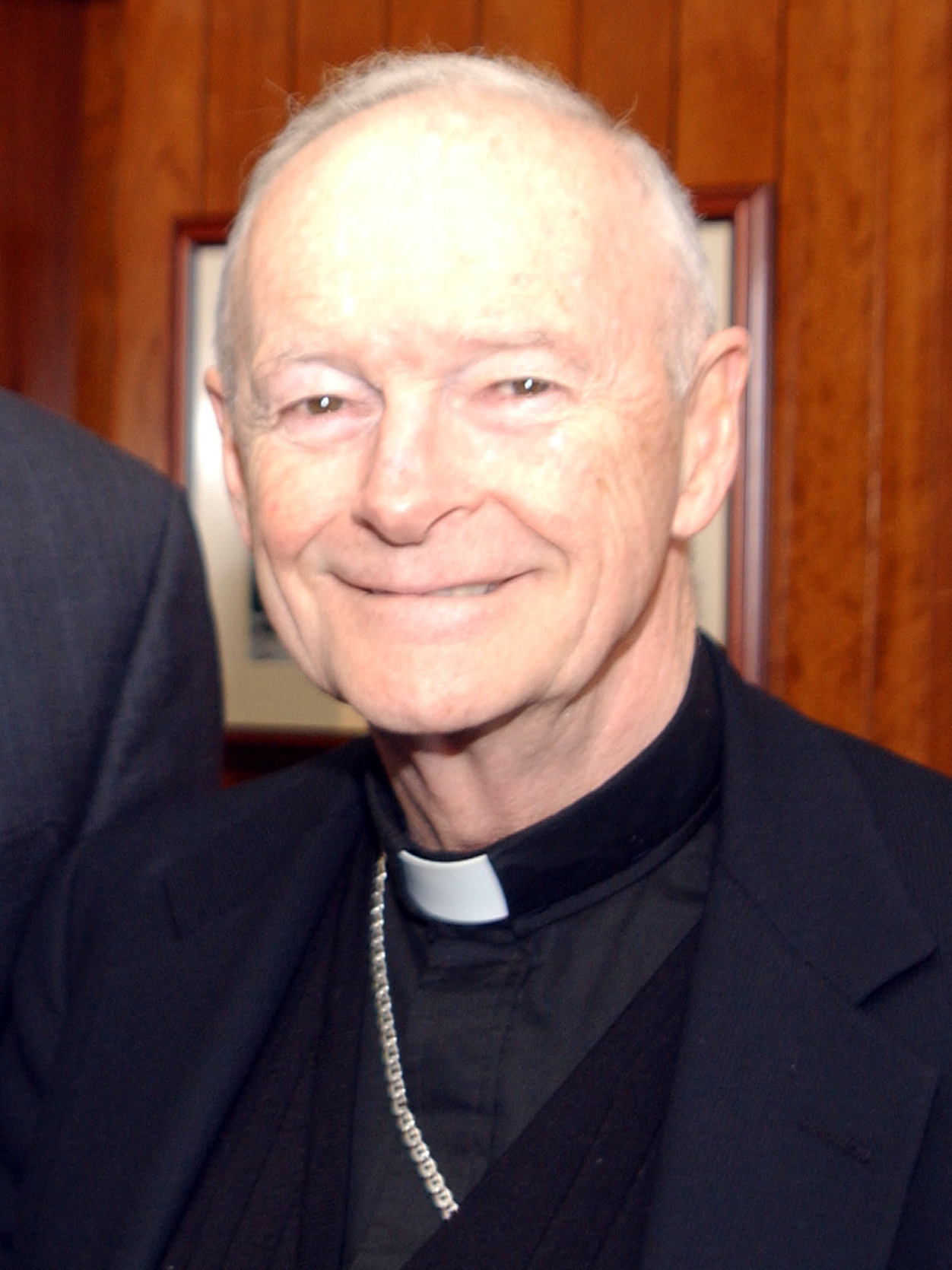
Former Cardinal McCarrick (2002)

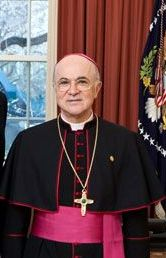
Archbishop Viganò (2013)

On August 25, 2018, Archbishop Carlo Maria Viganò, former papal nuncio to the United States, released an 11-page letter describing a series of warnings to the Vatican on sexual misconduct by Theodore McCarrick, Wuerl's predecessor as Archbishop of Washington, and a subsequent alleged cover-up by the Vatican and senior church officials. Viganò stated that he had discussed McCarrick's conduct and the penalties surrounding it with Wuerl. Viganò accused Wuerl of putting seminarians at risk by allowing McCarrick to reside at the Redemptoris Mater Archdiocesan Seminary after his retirement despite knowing that he was accused of abusing seminarians.

Through a spokesman, Wuerl denied that he was aware of McCarrick's misconduct prior to his removal from ministry on June 20, 2018. He also denied Viganò's claim that he knew of restrictions that the Vatican imposed on McCarrick. However, on January 10, 2019, The Washington Post published a story stating that Wuerl was aware of allegations against McCarrick in 2004 and reported them to the Vatican. Former priest Robert Ciolek, who had made the allegations, told the Post that Wuerl shared the information in 2004, during his time as Bishop of Pittsburgh, with then-Vatican ambassador Gabriel Montalvo Higuera. After the publication of the Post story, both the Diocese of Pittsburgh and the Archdiocese of Washington admitted that Wuerl knew about Ciolek's allegations in 2004 and did report them to the Vatican. The archdiocese said that Wuerl did not intend to be "imprecise" in his earlier denials; he said they referred only to claims of abuse against minors, not adults. Days later, Wuerl himself apologized, stating that his earlier denials were the result of a "lapse of memory." Ciolek refused to believe that Wuerl forgot and did not accept his apology.

On May 28, 2019, the news site Crux published some 2008 correspondence written by McCarrick. In it, McCarrick refers to travel restrictions that were placed on him by Benedict XVI that same year after allegations of sexual misconduct. However, McCarrick gradually began to resume travelling. In a 2008 letter to Pietro Sambi, apostolic nuncio to the U.S., McCarrick wrote he had shared a Vatican letter explaining the restrictions with Wuerl, saying that his "help and understanding is, as always, a great help and fraternal support to me." However, a spokesperson for Wuerl denied that he had any knowledge of the sanctions.

=== Pittsburgh-area Lawsuits ===
On August 7, 2020, Wuerl was named as a defendant in a new sex abuse lawsuit was filed in Allegheny County Common Pleas Court. The lawsuit claimed that Wuerl promised in 1994 that Reverend Leo Burchianti, who was accused of sexually abusing at least eight boys, would not receive a new church assignment. Wuerl and then-Father David Zubik later gave Burchianti a voluntary work assignment at St. John Vianney Manor, a home for retired priests. Burchianti remained there from 1995 to 2012 and died in 2013. Wuerl has been named as a defendant in other sex abuse lawsuits involving the Diocese of Pittsburgh as well.

== Retirement as archbishop of Washington ==
Wuerl submitted a letter of resignation as archbishop of Washington to Francis in 2015, having met the customary retirement age for archbishops of 75. However, the pope did not accept his resignation at that time. Three years later, on October 12, 2018, Pope Francis accepted Wuerl's resignation.

Wuerl had planned to officially resign in September 2018 after meeting with Pope Francis first. However, the Vatican never scheduled a meeting, and Francis accepted Wuerl's resignation in a letter. In the letter of acceptance, Francis praised Wuerl as a "model bishop" and said "You have sufficient elements to justify your actions and distinguish between what it means to cover up crimes or not to deal with problems, and to commit some mistakes."

Francis appointed Wuerl to serve as apostolic administrator of Washington, D.C., until his successor was appointed. Wuerl departed as apostolic administrator when Archbishop Wilton Gregory was installed on May 21, 2019.

An October 2018 New York Times editorial criticized Francis for the way he characterized Wuerl's resignation and handling of abuse cases. That same month, Shapiro criticized the Pope's decision to allow Wuerl to resign without facing stronger consequences. On October 12, 2018, Wuerl wrote to members of the archdiocese and said,

"I am sorry and ask for healing for all of those who were so deeply wounded at the hands of the Church's ministers. I also beg forgiveness on behalf of Church leadership from the victims who were again wounded when they saw these priests and bishops both moved and promoted."

In 2020, the archdiocese designated $2 million for "continuing ministry activities for [the] Archbishop Emeritus."

== Selected writings ==
- The Forty Martyrs: New Saints of England and Wales (Huntington: Our Sunday Visitor, 1971)
- Fathers of the Church (Huntington: Our Sunday Visitor, 1975)
- The Catholic Priesthood Today (Chicago: Franciscan Herald Press, 1976)
- The Teaching of Christ: A Catholic Catechism for Adults (Huntington: Our Sunday Visitor, 1976), co-author
- A Visit to the Vatican: For Young People (Boston: St. Paul Editions, 1981)
- The Gift of Faith: A Question and Answer Version of The Teaching of Christ (Huntington: Our Sunday Visitor, 2001)
- The Catholic Way: Faith for Living Today (New York: Doubleday, 2001)
- The Sacraments: A Continuing Encounter with Christ (Our Sunday Visitor, 2010)
- The Mass: The Glory, The Mystery, The Tradition (New York: Doubleday, 2011)
- The Gift of Blessed John Paul II (Frederick, MD: The Word Among Us Press, 2011)
- Seek First the Kingdom: Challenging the Culture by Living Our Faith (Huntington: Our Sunday Visitor, 2011)
- Faith That Transforms Us: Reflections on the Creed (Frederick, MD: The Word Among Us Press, 2013)
- New Evangelization: Passing on the Catholic Faith Today (Our Sunday Visitor, 2013)
- The Church: Unlocking the Secrets to the Places Catholics Call Home (Image, 2013)
- The Light is On For You: The Life-Changing Power of Confession (Frederick, MD: The Word Among Us Press, 2014)
- The Feasts: How the Church Year Forms Us as Catholics (Image: 2014)
- Open to the Holy Spirit: Living the Gospel with Wisdom (Our Sunday Visitor, 2014)
- The Marriage God Wants For You (Frederick, MD: The Word Among Us Press, 2015)
- To the Martyrs: A Reflection on the Supreme Christian Witness (Emmaus Road Publishing, 2015)
- Ways to Pray: Growing Closer to God (Our Sunday Visitor, 2015)

=== Pastoral letters as Archbishop of Washington ===
- "Being Catholic Today: Catholic Identity in an Age of Challenge" (So Católico Hoy: Identidad católica en una época de desafíos), May 24, 2015
- "Manifesting the Kingdom: A Pastoral Letter on the First Synod of the Archdiocese of Washington" (La Manifestación del Reino), June 8, 2014
- The Church, Our Spiritual Home (La Iglesia, Nuestro Hogar Espiritual), September 14, 2012
- "Disciples of the Lord: Sharing the Vision", August 23, 2010
- "God's Mercy and Loving Presence" (La Misericordia y la Amorosa Presencia de Dios), January 3, 2010
- "Belonging to God's Family" (Pertenciendo a la Familia de Dios), January 25, 2009
- "Catholic Education: Looking to the Future with Confidence", September 14, 2008
- "Reflections on God's Mercy And Our Forgiveness" (Reflexiones sobre la Misericordia de Dios y el Perdón), January 1, 2008
- "God's Mercy and the Sacrament of Penance" (La Misericordia de Dios y el Sacramento de la Penitencia), January 8, 2007

== See also ==
- Catholic Church hierarchy
- Catholic Church in the United States
- Historical list of the Catholic bishops of the United States
- List of Catholic bishops of the United States
- Lists of patriarchs, archbishops, and bishops

Catholic Church titles
Preceded by Anthony Bevilacqua	Bishop of Pittsburgh; 1988–2006	Succeeded by David Zubik
Preceded by Theodore McCarrick	Archbishop of Washington; 2006–2018	Succeeded by Wilton Daniel Gregory
Preceded by Pio Laghi	— TITULAR — Cardinal-Priest of San Pietro in Vincoli; 2010–present	Incumbent
