= Seton-La Salle Catholic High School =

Seton LaSalle Catholic High School

Location
- Mt. Lebanon, (Allegheny County), Pennsylvania 15226; United States; 40.38731°N 80.02609°W

Information
- Type: Private
- Motto: In Fide et Caritate (In faith and charity)
- Religious affiliation: Catholic
- Established: 1979
- Oversight: Roman Catholic Diocese of Pittsburgh
- Superintendent: Michael A. Latusek
- President: Lisa Osterhau
- Principal: Will Merchant
- Grades: 9-12
- Colors: Green and gold
- Nickname: Rebels
- Accreditation: Middle States Association of Colleges and Schools
- Newspaper: The Rebel Report
- Yearbook: The Sentinel
- Website: www.slshs.org

Seton LaSalle Catholic High School is a private, Roman Catholic high school in Mt. Lebanon, Pennsylvania, a suburb of Pittsburgh, Pennsylvania. It is located in the Roman Catholic Diocese of Pittsburgh.

In 2016, Seton LaSalle simplified the format of its name, changing the school's name from "Seton-La Salle Catholic High School" to "Seton LaSalle Catholic High School". However, the original format is still displayed prominently in several places, including the front of the building and the title of this article.

== Academics ==
Seton LaSalle has been ranked among the top 50 Catholic high schools in the U.S. The required courses at Seton LaSalle build upon state-mandated courses. Instruction is provided to students in three tracks: Honors, Academic, and General. Also, 16 AP courses are offered. The grading system at Seton LaSalle is similar to some other high schools (especially Catholic high schools) in that an "A" is rewarded for work that receives a 93% through 100%. Also, Seton LaSalle is accredited by the Middle States Association of Colleges and Schools.

== Athletics ==
Seton LaSalle is a member of the Pennsylvania Interscholastic Athletic Association (PIAA) and the Western Pennsylvania Interscholastic Athletic League (WPIAL) District Seven. The school competes athletically at the WPIAL "AA" level.

=== Sports ===
Baseball, Basketball (Boys & Girls), Bowling (co-ed), Cheerleading, Crew (co-ed), Cross Country (Boys & Girls), Fencing (co-ed), Football, Golf (Boys & Girls), Lacrosse (Boys & Girls), Soccer (Boys & Girls), Softball, Swimming (co-ed), Tennis (co-ed), and Volleyball (Boys & Girls).

=== List of athletic championships ===
- PIAA Team Championships

Gender	Sport	Year(s)
Boys	Football	2026
Boys	Basketball	1988
Girls	Basketball	1984, 2012, 2014
Boys	Soccer	2006, 2008

- WPIAL Team Championships

Gender	Sport	Year(s)	Boys	Baseball	1995, 2019, 2023, 2024
Girls	Basketball	1983, 1984, 2000, 2011, 2012, 2014, 2015			
Boys	Basketball	1989, 2014			
Boys	Football	1979, 1980, 1990, 2002, 2004, 2025, 2026			
Boys	Soccer	2002, 2006, 2008, 2010, 2011, 2015			
Girls	Soccer	1988			
Girls	Softball	1983, 1984			
Girls	Volleyball	2007			
Boys	Hockey	1980,1998			

=== Rebel Athletic Field ===
Seton LaSalle Catholic High School has completed phase one of its athletic field renovation.

Phase II of the project will consist of a field house, toilets and concession stand along with new bleachers and field lights. Phase II will be completed once sufficient funds have been received.

Already, the field is being used by at least 14 of the school’s athletic teams, and for physical education classes, plus is used by area grade schools and other community groups.

== History ==
The school was formed in 1979 through the merger of two predecessor schools, South Hills Catholic High School, which was an all-male school run by the Christian Brothers, and Elizabeth Seton High School, an all-female school run by the Sisters of Charity of Seton Hill.

== Notable alumni ==
- Gino Gradkowski, starting center for the Baltimore Ravens. Gradkowski graduated from Seton LaSalle in 2006.
- Derek Law, MLB pitcher for the San Francisco Giants
- Tom Donahoe, former GM and president of the Buffalo Bills, and former director of football operations of the Pittsburgh Steelers. Head coach of Seton LaSalle's to back-to-back WPIAL football championships in 1979 and 1980. Graduated from South Hills Catholic 1965.
- Esteban, (Stephen Paul) eclectic master guitarist graduated from South Hills Catholic in 1966.
- Stephen Flaherty, American composer of musical theater (best known work - Ragtime (musical)), from South Hills Catholic in 1978.
- David Morehouse, President of the Pittsburgh Penguins of the NHL and former advisor to President Clinton and Vice President Al Gore. Graduated from South Hills Catholic in 1978.
- Robert Coury, CEO of Mylan Pharmaceutical. Graduated from South Hills Catholic in 1978.
- D. Michael Fisher, Federal Judge on the Court of Appeals for the Third Circuit. Formerly served as a state representative and senator, then as Pennsylvania Attorney General from 1997-2003. Graduated from South Hills Catholic in 1962.
- John Friel, CEO and President of Medrad Inc., a worldwide leading provider of medical devices and services used in diagnostic imaging. Accepted the Malcolm Baldrige National Quality Award from President George W. Bush in March 2004. Graduated from South Hills Catholic in 1971.
- Bruce Gradkowski, quarterback for the University of Toledo, Tampa Bay Buccaneers, Cleveland Browns, Oakland Raiders, Cincinnati Bengals, and Pittsburgh Steelers. Gradkowski graduated from Seton LaSalle in 2001.
- Billy Hartung, Broadway actor, dancer, and singer.
- Donald J. Lee Jr., executive producer of the movie World Trade Center. Graduated from South Hills Catholic in 1973.
- Suzie McConnell Serio, Head Coach of University of Pittsburgh women's basketball team, former head coach of Duquesne University women's basketball team. Former coach of the WNBA's Minnesota Lynx where she won the 2004 WNBA Coach of the Year. Former professional basketball player with the Cleveland Rockers of the WNBA. Member of the gold medal-winning U.S. women's basketball team in the 1988 Summer Olympics, and earned a bronze medal at the 1992 Summer Olympics. Member of the Women's Basketball Hall of Fame. Graduated from Seton LaSalle in 1984.
- Kathy McConnell-Miller, head coach of the University of Colorado Buffaloes women's basketball team. She was head coach at the University of Tulsa. Graduated from Seton LaSalle in 1985.
- Kevin Salvadori, former North Carolina Tar Heels basketball, member of 1993 NCAA Men's Basketball Championship team and NBA star. Graduated from Seton LaSalle in 1989.
- Jim Sweeney, played in the NFL from 1984-1999 with the New York Jets, Seattle Seahawks, and Pittsburgh Steelers. Graduated from Seton LaSalle in 1980.
- Chelsa Wagner, Pennsylvania State Representative from the 22nd legislative district. Elected in 2006. Graduated from Seton LaSalle in 1995.
- Bernard Hebda, SHC 1977 Archbishop of Saint Paul-Minneapolis, MN. Previously served as Co-Adjutor Archbishop of Newark, NJ and as Bishop of Diocese of Gaylord, MI. Prior to his appointment in Gaylord, he served as undersecretary of the Pontifical Council for Legislative Texts in Rome and as an adjunct spiritual director at the North American College, and as a confessor for the postulants of the Missionaries of Charity, and for the sisters of that community working at a home for unwed mothers.
- Mark Eckman, SHC 1977, 13th Bishop of Pittsburgh, PA. Previously served as Auxiliary Bishop of Pittsburgh from 2022-2025.
