= Esteban (musician) =

American musician

Stephen Paul (born 1947 or 1948) is an American classical guitarist best known by the stage name Esteban. He is from the Pittsburgh area and has lived in Tempe, Arizona since 1976.

He has sold instructional DVDs and guitars on home-shopping channels QVC and the HSN.

== Biography ==
Paul was the oldest of four children. He began playing guitar at the age of eight when his uncle brought him a nylon-stringed guitar. He attended South Hills Catholic High School (since absorbed into Seton-La Salle Catholic High School) in Mt. Lebanon. He then attended Carnegie Mellon University, where he double-majored in music and English. At this time, he claims he was teaching approximately 150 students per week and playing in nightclubs.

=== Segovia ===
Esteban then wished to study with Andrés Segovia. Esteban claims, after a long period where he pursued Segovia by sending notes to the hotels where he was staying, he finally met Segovia in Los Angeles in 1972 and studied with him intermittently for the next five years, splitting his time between Spain and California.

The extent of the connection between Segovia and Esteban, however, is heavily disputed. Although Esteban did meet Segovia, Esteban is not mentioned in any biography of Segovia, and Esteban never received the public acknowledgment Segovia gave students such as John Williams and Eliot Fisk. Segovia autographed one of his books for Esteban in 1978 with a flattering message, but Segovia is known to have signed hundreds or thousands of such messages.

=== Album release ===
Esteban had been playing at a Hyatt Regency hotel when he released his first album in 1991. In 1999, Esteban came to the attention of Joy Mangano at Ingenious Designs, inventor of several products sold on the QVC home-shopping channel. She invited Esteban to play on QVC in November 1999. Esteban sold 132,000 CDs after two appearances on HSN in the summer of 2000, and two of his albums reached the top 54 entries in the Billboard 200. Esteban quit playing at the Hyatt in 2000. From 2001 to 2003, Esteban released over a dozen additional albums, four of which placed in the lower half of the Billboard 200. He has appeared in several infomercials advertising his guitars and instructional DVDs.

== Discography ==
- Duende (1991)
- Songs From My Heart (1992)
- Spirits of the West (1993)
- What Child Is This? (1994)
- Flamenco Y Rosas (1995) 2-CD set
- Pasión (1997)
- Enter the Heart (1998)
- Heart of Gold (1999)
- All My Love (2000)
- At Home With Esteban (2000) 2-CD set
- Esteban Live! (2001) 2-CD set
- Flame, Flamenco & Romance, Vol. 1 (2001) 2-CD set
- Esteban By Request (2001) 4-CD set
- Holiday Trilogy (2001) 3-CD set includes A Classic Christmas, A Traditional Christmas, and A 21st Century Christmas
- Joy To The World (2001)
- Happy Holidays, With Love (2002) 2-CD set
- Flame, Flamenco & Romance, Vol. 2 (2002) 2-CD set
- Walk Beside Me: The Greatest Inspirational Songs Of All Time (2002) 2-CD set
- Eternal Love (2002) 2-CD set
- Celebrate the Memories (2002)
- Back 2 Back (2003) 2-CD set
- Magic Moments (2003)
- Live in Sedona (2003) 2-CD set
- Happy Holidays, With Love (Esteban's Favorite Holiday Treasures) (2003)
- Favorite Holiday Memories (2003)
- Classic Holiday Memories (2003)
- Father/Daughter (2004) 2-CD set
- The New Flamenco Y Rosas (2006)
- Best of Esteban (2006)
- Wear the Black (A Tribute to Johnny Cash) (2011) 2-CD set

== See also ==
- New Flamenco
- Flamenco rumba
