= Saint Paul Seminary (Pittsburgh) =

- The coat of arms of the Diocese of Pittsburgh

Location
- 2900 Noblestown Road; Pittsburgh, Pennsylvania; 40°25′13″N 80°4′11″W

Information
- Type: Roman Catholic seminary
- Established: 1965 (61 years ago)
- Rector: Very Rev. Thomas A. Sparacino
- Website: diopitt.org/seminary

Saint Paul Seminary is the diocesan minor seminary for the Roman Catholic Diocese of Pittsburgh. It is located in East Carnegie, a neighborhood of Pittsburgh, Pennsylvania. It shares a campus with the diocese's pastoral center.

The seminary is not a degree-granting institution; seminarians in their collegiate or pre-theological studies attend classes at Franciscan University of Steubenville.

== History ==
=== Previous diocesan seminaries ===
Bishop Michael O'Connor founded Pittsburgh's first diocesan seminary in 1844, the first year of his episcopate. St. Michael Seminary was located in Pittsburgh's Birmingham neighborhood. It was briefly discontinued for four years (1851–1856), operated for a year in Cambria County, and was finally reestablished in the Pittsburgh neighborhood of Glenwood. The seminary definitively closed in 1876 with the tumultuous creation of the Diocese of Allegheny out of the Diocese of Pittsburgh. After 1876, Pittsburgh's diocesan seminarians received instruction at Saint Vincent Seminary in Latrobe.

Seminarians during the episcopacy of Hugh C. Boyle, from 1926 to 1945, were allowed to commute to Duquesne University from home. Bishop John F. Dearden, however, ended that practice. Until the creation of Saint Paul's, Pittsburgh seminarians would attend classes at other minor seminaries in Pennsylvania, Ohio, Indiana, and Kentucky.

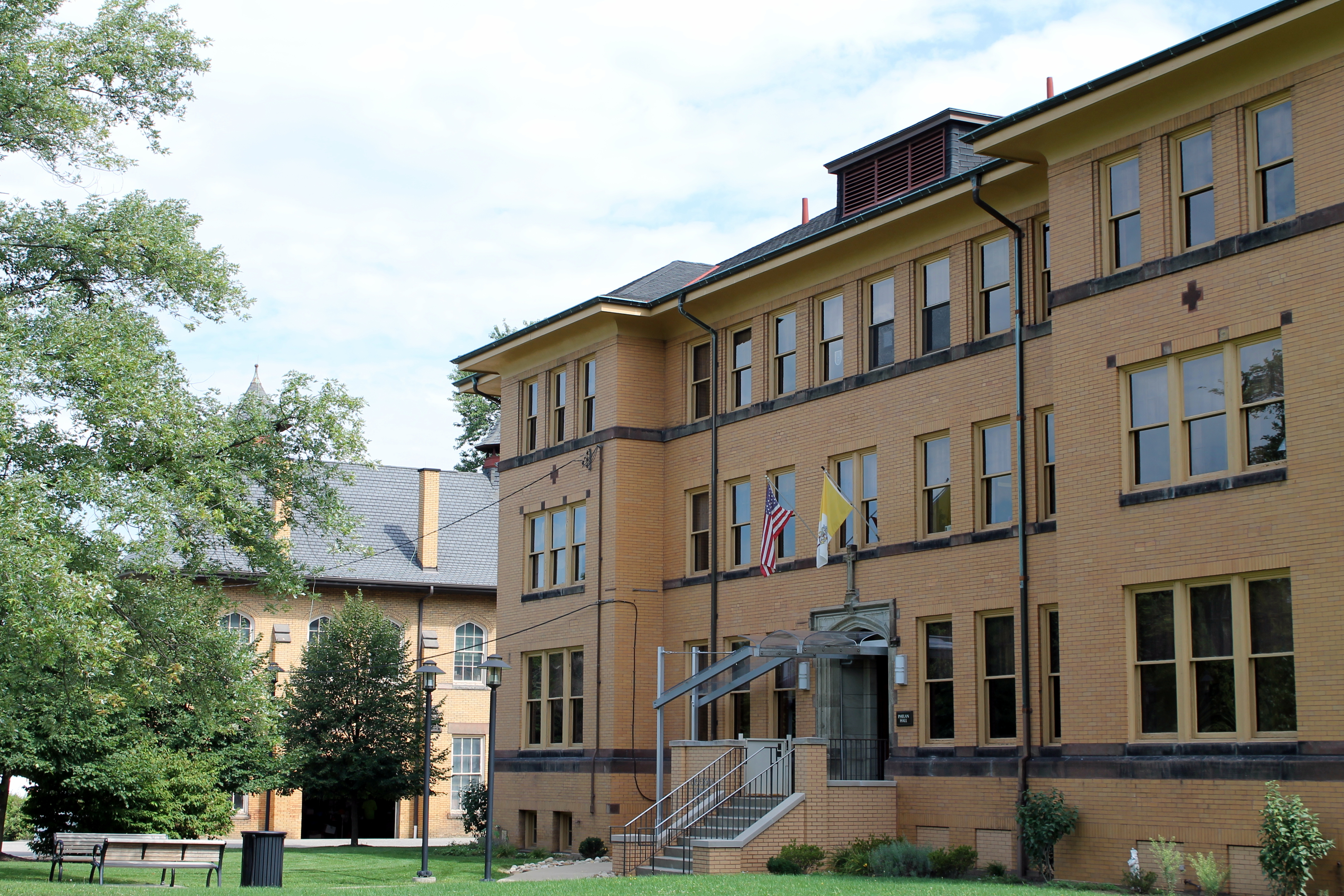
Phelan Hall on the campus of St. Paul Seminary

=== Establishment of Saint Paul's ===
Saint Paul Seminary occupies the grounds and buildings of the former Saint Paul Orphanage. The 17-acre (6.9 ha) campus began its connection with the Pittsburgh diocese with the establishment of the orphanage there on May 27, 1900, on "a plateau at Idlewood between Crafton and Carnegie." The orphanage operated until August 1965, when its operations were combined with those of Holy Family Institute in Emsworth. In September 1965, Bishop John Wright founded St. Paul Seminary as a minor, or "transitional," seminary on the same site.

Pittsburgh bishop David Zubik sold the diocesan bishop's mansion in Oakland in favor of a simpler apartment on the seminary's campus in 2007. Auxiliary bishop emeritus William J. Winter is also in residence.

=== Leadership ===
The following priests have served as rectors of Saint Paul's Seminary since its founding in 1965: Three former rectors, Edward Burns, David Bonnar, and Donald Wuerl have been raised to the order of bishop, and Donald Wuerl was raised to cardinal of the Archdiocese of Washington by Pope Benedict XVI.

1. Rev. Msgr. Donald W. Kraus (1965–1981)
2. Rev. Donald W. Wuerl (1981–1985)
3. Rev. Theodore A. Rutkowski (1985–1986)
4. Rev. Msgr. William M. Ogrodowski (1986–1990)
5. Rev. Charles S. Bober (1990–1993)
6. Rev. Joseph J. Kleppner (1993–1996)
7. Rev. Edward J. Burns (1996–1997) (first term)
8. Rev. David J. Bonnar (1997–2002)
9. Rev. James A. Wehner (2002–2008)
10. Rev. Msgr. Edward J. Burns (2008–2009) (second term)
11. Rev. Dennis P. Yurochko (2009–2011)
12. Rev. Joseph M. Mele (2011–2014)
13. Rev. Brian J. Welding (2014–2017)
14. Rev. Thomas A. Sparacino (2017–present)

The current rector is the Very Rev. Thomas A Sparacino.

== See also ==
- List of Roman Catholic seminaries
