= William J. Winter =

His Excellency, The Most Reverend William Joseph Winter
- Auxiliary Bishop Emeritus of Pittsburgh; Titular Bishop of Uthina
- Archdiocese: Philadelphia
- Diocese: Pittsburgh
- Appointed: December 21, 1988
- Installed: February 13, 1989
- Retired: May 20, 2005
- Other post: Titular Bishop of Uthina

Orders
- Ordination: December 17, 1955 by Martin John O’Connor
- Consecration: February 13, 1989 by Donald W. Wuerl, Anthony G. Bosco, and John B. McDowell

Personal details
- Born: May 20, 1930 (age 96) Pittsburgh, Pennsylvania, US
- Education: St. Vincent Seminary; Pontifical Gregorian University (S.T.D., 1958)
- Motto: To do your will

Styles of William Joseph Winter
- Reference style: His Excellency; The Most Reverend
- Spoken style: Your Excellency
- Religious style: Bishop

William Joseph Winter (born May 20, 1930) is an American prelate of the Roman Catholic Church who served as an auxiliary bishop of the Diocese of Pittsburgh in Pennsylvania from 1988 to 2005.

== Biography ==
=== Early life ===
Winter was born on May 20, 1930, in the Beechview section of Pittsburgh. He attended St. Catherine of Siena (Beechview) for grade school, and St. Michael High School in Pittsburgh's South Side before entering St. Vincent Seminary in Unity Township, Pennsylvania in 1948.

=== Priesthood ===
Winter was ordained a priest by Archbishop Martin John O’Connor for the Diocese of Pittsburgh on December 17, 1955. After his ordination, Winter briefly served as an assistant pastor at St. Bernard Parish in Mount Lebanon, Pennsylvania. He then travelled to Rome to study at the Pontifical Gregorian University, receiving a degree in sacred theology in 1958.

After returning to Pittsburgh from Rome, Winter was assigned as the pastor of Holy Innocents Parish in Sheraden, Pennsylvania, and then St. Philip's Parish in Crafton, Pennsylvania. He also served as assistant chancellor and vice-chancellor of the diocese.

=== Auxiliary Bishop of Pittsburgh ===
Winter was appointed as auxiliary bishop of the Diocese of Pittsburgh on December 21, 1988, by Pope John Paul II. He was consecrated on February 13, 1989, by then Archbishop Donald Wuerl. While auxiliary bishop, Winter also served as pastor of Sacred Heart Parish in the Shadyside section of Pittsburgh. He led the Parish Reorganization and Revitalization Project that dissolved or consolidated 163 parishes in the diocese between 1992 and 1994.

=== Retirement ===
Winter submitted his letter of resignation as auxiliary bishop of the Diocese of Pittsburgh when he reached the mandatory retirement age for bishops of 75. It was accepted by Pope Benedict XVI on May 20, 2005. At the time of his resignation, Winter was recognized by the Pittsburgh Post-Gazette for confirming an estimated 45,000 Catholics. Since he retired, Winter has resided at St. John Vianney Manor Retirement Home on the campus of St. Paul Seminary in Crafton, Pennsylvania and the Sts. Peter & Paul Home run by the Little Sisters of the Poor in Pittsburgh's Brighton Heights neighborhood.

== See also ==
- Catholic Church hierarchy
- Catholic Church in the United States
- Historical list of the Catholic bishops of the United States
- List of Catholic bishops of the United States
- Lists of patriarchs, archbishops, and bishops

== Episcopal succession ==
Catholic Church titles
Preceded by –	Auxiliary Bishop Emeritus of Pittsburgh; 2005–present	Succeeded by incumbent
Preceded by –	Auxiliary Bishop of Pittsburgh; 1989–2005	Succeeded by –
