= Charles Richard Mulrooney =

American prelate

- Auxiliary Bishop of Brooklyn
- Appointed: February 24, 1959
- Installed: 1959
- Term ended: 1981

Orders
- Ordination: June 10, 1930
- Consecration: April 22, 1960 by Bishop Bryan Joseph McEntegart

Personal details
- Born: January 13, 1906 Brooklyn, New York
- Died: August 5, 1989 (aged 83) Queen of Peace Residence, Queens Village
- Denomination: Roman Catholic
- Education: Cathedral College, Brooklyn
- Alma mater: St. Mary's Seminary, Baltimore, Maryland

Charles Richard Mulrooney (January 13, 1906 – August 5, 1989) was an American prelate of the Roman Catholic Church. He served as an auxiliary bishop of the Diocese of Brooklyn from 1959 to 1981.

== Biography ==
Mulrooney was born in Brooklyn, New York, to Patrick and Katherine (née Gibbons) Mulrooney. He attended Cathedral College in Brooklyn from 1921 to 1924, and graduated from St. Mary's Seminary in Baltimore, Maryland, in 1926. He then studied at the Sulpician Seminary of the Catholic University of America in Washington, D.C., where he earned a Bachelor of Sacred Theology degree.

He was ordained to the priesthood in Washington on June 10, 1930. Following his return to New York, he was assigned as a curate at St. Gerard Majella Church in Hollis, where he remained for two years. He taught at Cathedral College from 1932 until 1952, when he became its rector.

On February 24, 1959, he was appointed auxiliary bishop of Brooklyn and titular bishop of Valentiniana by Pope John XXIII. He received his episcopal consecration on the following April 22 from Bishop Bryan Joseph McEntegart, with Bishops James Griffiths and John Joseph Carberry serving as co-consecrators. As an auxiliary bishop, he served as pastor of St. Jerome's Church in Flatbush from 1959 to 1972. Upon reaching the mandatory retirement age of 75, he resigned as auxiliary bishop on January 13, 1981.

He died at the Queen of Peace Residence in Queens Village, at age 83.

Catholic Church titles
Preceded by –	Auxiliary Bishop of Brooklyn; 1959 – 1981	Succeeded by –
