= Ksour-El-Khaoua =

Ksour-El-Khaoua is a locality in southern Tunisia, North Africa. During the Roman Empire the town was a civitas (town) in the Roman province of Byzacena. and the seat of an ancient Christian bishopric.

The ancient Christian bishopric survives today as a titular see of the Roman Catholic Church.

The only Bishop known from this diocese is Stefano, who participated in the Council of Carthage (641). The current titular bishop of the town is John Stephen Knight.

Africa Proconsularis (125 AD)
