= Anthony Bevilacqua =

American cardinal

His Eminence Anthony Joseph Bevilacqua
- Cardinal, Archbishop of Philadelphia
- See: Philadelphia
- Appointed: December 8, 1987
- Installed: February 11, 1988
- Term ended: July 15, 2003
- Predecessor: John Krol
- Successor: Justin Francis Rigali
- Other post: Cardinal-Priest of Santissimo Redentore e Sant'Alfonso in Via Merulan
- Previous posts: Bishop of Pittsburgh (1983–1988); Auxiliary Bishop of Brooklyn (1980–1983)

Orders
- Ordination: June 11, 1949 by Thomas Edmund Molloy
- Consecration: November 24, 1980 by Francis Mugavero
- Created cardinal: June 28, 1991 by John Paul II
- Rank: Cardinal-Priest

Personal details
- Born: June 17, 1923 Brooklyn, New York, US
- Died: January 31, 2012 (aged 88) Wynnewood, Pennsylvania, US
- Denomination: Catholic
- Education: Cathedral College (BA); Pontifical Gregorian University (JCD); Columbia University (MA); St. John's University (JD)
- Motto: Ecclesia Mater Nostra (The church, our mother)

Styles of Anthony Bevilacqua
- Reference style: His Eminence
- Spoken style: Your Eminence
- Religious style: Cardinal
- Informal style: Cardinal
- See: Philadelphia (emeritus)

Anthony Joseph Bevilacqua (June 17, 1923 – January 31, 2012) was an American cardinal of the Catholic Church. He served as archbishop of the Archdiocese of Philadelphia in Pennsylvania from 1988 to 2003.

Bevilacqua previously served as bishop of the Diocese of Pittsburgh in Pennsylvania from 1983 to 1987 and as an auxiliary bishop of the Diocese of Brooklyn in New York from 1980 to 1983. He was elevated to the cardinalate in 1991.

== Biography ==
=== Early life and education ===
Anthony Bevilacqua was born on June 17, 1923, in Brooklyn, New York, to Luigi (1884–1961) and Maria (née Codella, 1893–1968) Bevilacqua. Luigi was born in Spinazzola, Italy and worked as a bricklayer. and Maria was born in Calitri, Italy. Anthony Bevilacqua had four brothers: Michael, Angelo, Rocco, and Frank; and six sisters, Josephine (died of meningitis at age two), Isabella, Virginia, Mary Jo, Gloria, and Madeline. Luigi immigrated to the United States in 1910, followed by Maria and their oldest son, Michael. The family lived in New Rochelle, New York; Hartford, Connecticut; and Brooklyn before settling in Woodhaven, Queens. Luigi operated a hair dyeing shop and shoe shine shop in Queens.

Anthony Bevilacqua attended Public School No. 60, St. Thomas the Apostle School, and Richmond Hill High School, all in the Borough of Queens. He then studied at Cathedral College in Queens, where he won prizes in mathematics and science. He earned a trip to Washington, D.C. for an essay on the Immaculate Conception. Bevilacqua graduated from Cathedral College with a Bachelor of Arts in 1943, and then entered the Seminary of the Immaculate Conception in Huntington, New York.

=== Ordination and ministry ===
Ordination history of Anthony Bevilacqua
History
Priestly ordination
- Ordained by: Thomas Edmund Molloy
- Date: June 11, 1949
- Place: Cathedral Basilica of St. James, Brooklyn, New York
Episcopal consecration
- Principal consecrator: Francis Mugavero
- Co-consecrators: John J. Snyder, Charles Richard Mulrooney
- Date: November 24, 1980
- Place: Basilica of Our Lady of Perpetual Help, Brooklyn, New York
Cardinalate
- Elevated by: Pope John Paul II
- Date: June 28, 1991
Episcopal succession
Bishops consecrated by Anthony Bevilacqua as principal consecrator
- Nicholas C. Dattilo: January 26, 1990
- Edward Cullen: April 14, 1994
- Robert P. Maginnis: March 11, 1996
- Joseph Martino: March 11, 1996
- Michael Francis Burbidge: September 5, 2002

Bevilacqua was ordained to the priesthood for the Diocese of Brooklyn by Bishop Thomas Malloy on June 11, 1949, at St. James Cathedral in Brooklyn. He then served as an associate pastor at Sacred Heart of Jesus and St. Mary Parish in Brooklyn and St. Mary Parish on Long Island until 1950. Bevilacqua taught at Cathedral College from 1950 to 1954, and then entered the Pontifical Gregorian University in Rome. He obtained a Doctor of Canon Law summa cum laude from the Gregorian in 1956.

After returning to Brooklyn, Bevilacqua served on the diocesan tribunal and as a chaplain to the Sisters of St. Joseph congregation in Brentwood, New York. He earned a Master of Arts in political science from Columbia University in 1962, and was named vice-chancellor of the diocese in 1965. From 1968 to 1980, Bevilacqua was a visiting professor of canon law at Seminary of the Immaculate Conception. During this time, he also founded the Diocesan Office for Migration and Refugees in 1971. Bevilacqua earned a J.D. from St. John's University in Queens in 1975. He was admitted to practice law in the courts of New York and Pennsylvania and before the U.S. Supreme Court.

Bevilacqua was named by the Holy See as honorary prelate of his holiness on January 23, 1976; he became chancellor of the diocese that year. He remained chancellor of the diocese and director of its Migration and Refugee Office until 1983. From 1977 to 1980, Bevilacqua taught immigration law as an adjunct professor at St. John's University School of Law.

=== Auxiliary Bishop of Brooklyn ===
On October 7, 1980, Bevilacqua was appointed as an auxiliary bishop of Brooklyn, and titular bishop of Aquae Albae in Byzacena by Pope John Paul II. He received his episcopal consecration on November 24, 1980, from Bishop Francis Mugavero, with Bishops John J. Snyder and Charles Mulrooney serving as co-consecrators, at the Basilica of Our Lady of Perpetual Help in Brooklyn. Bevilacqua selected as his episcopal motto: Ecclesia Mater Nostra, meaning "The Church, our Mother."

==== Mansour controversy ====
In 1983, Bevilacqua became involved in the case of Agnes Mary Mansour. A member of the Sisters of Mercy religious order in Detroit, Mansour administered the State of Michigan's Medicaid program as the director of the Michigan Department of Social Services. In 1983, Detroit Archbishop Edmund Szoka asked Mansour to declare her opposition to public financing of abortion procedures, which she refused to do. The Vatican then sent Bevilacqua to meet with her. He told Mansour that if she did not resign as director, she would have to leave the Sisters of Mercy. Mansour chose to keep her job and leave the religious order.

In the early 1980s, as chair of the Committee on Canonical Affairs, Bevilacqua led the US Conference of Catholic Bishops (USCCB) through the first phases of implementing the new 1983 Code of Canon Law, making appropriate adaptations for the United States.

=== Bishop of Pittsburgh ===
Bevilacqua was named by John Paul II as the tenth bishop of Pittsburgh on October 7, 1983. Succeeding Bishop Vincent Leonard, Bevilacqua was installed by Bishop Mugavero on December 12, 1983. He was a member of the 1987 World Synod of Bishops on the role of laity in the church and the world.

==== O'Connor abuse case ====
In 1985, Reverend John O'Connor, a priest of the Diocese of Camden in New Jersey, was charged with inappropriately touching a 14-year-old boy in that diocese during a sleepover. O'Connor was arrested, then released to a pretrial intervention program in Toronto, followed by a period of court supervision. After O'Connor's completion of the program, Camden Bishop George Guilfoyle asked Bevilacqua to accept O'Connor in the Diocese of Pittsburgh. Bevilacqua agreed and assigned O'Connor as a hospital chaplain. O'Connor was moved back to the Diocese of Camden in 1993 because his 1984 Cape May County victim had sued and received a settlement.

==== Karabin abuse case ====
On August 14, 2018, Pennsylvania attorney general Josh Shapiro released a grand jury report detailing alleged sex abuse in six Pennsylvania dioceses, including the Diocese of Pittsburgh. The report showed a 1985 memo written by Bevilacqua in which he rejected a request to reassign Reverend Joseph Karabin, a diocese priest, after two children told the diocese he had sexually molested them. Bevilacqua did not report Karabin to the police, but sent him instead to a treatment center for alcohol abuse in Maryland. Karabin was kept on restricted assignments until 2002, when he was appointed as chaplain at a retirement home. Bishop Donald Wuerl, Bevilacqua's successor as bishop, withdrew Karabin's appointment and suspended his priestly faculties.

In 1986, Bevilacqua banned women from participating in the Holy Thursday foot-washing service. He said that the service was a re-enactment of the Last Supper, in which Jesus only washed men's feet. After pushback from Catholic women and from the National Conference of Catholic Bishops, Bevilacqua relented, allowing individual pastors to decide. However, he refused to attend services that washed women's feet.

=== Archbishop of Philadelphia ===
Pope John Paul II appointed Bevilacqua as archbishop of Philadelphia on December 8, 1987. Succeeding Cardinal John Krol, Bevilacqua was installed on February 11, 1988. He was named cardinal-priest of the Church of Ss. Redentore e S. Alfonso in Via Merulana in Rome during the consistory of June 28, 1991.

In 1998, Bevilacqua asked Pennsylvania Governor Tom Ridge to fund food stamp assistance for immigrants and instituted service centers for Latino and African American Catholics.

Bevilacqua is remembered for his frequent visits to churches in the diocese, his knowledge of fiscal matters, his conservatism, and his closing of schools. Organizationally, he divided the archdiocese into six vicariates, each with a general vicariate, and subdivided the central administration into six secretariats. He hosted a weekly radio call-in program, Live with Cardinal Bevilacqua, which aired on WZZD-AM in Philadelphia. In 2002, he was named to the PoliticsPA "Power 50" list of politically influential personalities.

Within the USCCB, Bevilacqua served as chair of the Committee on Migration from 1983 to 1984, during which time he visited the refugee camps of Southeast Asia and Africa. He also chaired the Committee for Canonical Affairs (1981–1984) and the Committee on Pro-Life Activities. In 2005, the Philadelphia District Attorney's office issued a report that criticized Bevilacqua and his predecessor, Cardinal Krol, for failing to protect children in the archdiocese from sexual abuse by priests.

=== Retirement and death ===
Upon reaching the mandatory retirement age of 75 in June 1998, Bevilacqua submitted his letter of resignation to John Paul II, who allowed him to continue in his post. Bevilacqua lost the right to participate in a papal conclave when he reached the age of 80 in June 2003. His resignation was accepted by John Paul II on July 15, 2003. Bevilacqua served as apostolic administrator of the archdiocese until the installation of his successor, Cardinal Justin Rigali, on October 7, 2003. In retirement, Bevilacqua lived at his home on the grounds of St. Charles Borromeo Seminary in Wynnewood, near Philadelphia.

In February 2011 it was reported that Bevilacqua was suffering from cancer and dementia. In November 2011, Bevilacqua gave a seven-hour deposition in a sealed hearing on the handling of sexual abuse cases in the archdiocese. Due to his declining health, his testimony was videotaped. Defense lawyers said the cardinal could no longer recognize the priest who had been his longtime aide.

Bevilacqua died suddenly on January 31, 2012, at age 88 in his home at St. Charles Borromeo in Wynnewood.

==== Lynn negligence case ====
In 2012, Monsignor William Lynn, former secretary for clergy in the Archdiocese of Philadelphia, was convicted of one count of child endangerment. This conviction resulted from his negligent oversight of Edward Avery, a priest in the archdiocese, who sexually fondled a 12-year-old boy. Lynn was acquitted of conspiracy and a second child endangerment count. Lynn's lawyers had argued that the case should be thrown out. They presented a 1994 memo that showed that Lynn had prepared a list of 35 abuse allegations against priests in the archdiocese. Bevilacqua had ordered Monsignor James Molloy to destroy the list.

==== Picard retaliation ====
During Lynn's trial, it was revealed that in 1996, Monsignor Michael Picard, the pastor of St. Andrew Parish in Newtown, Pennsylvania, had expressed concerns to Bevilacqua regarding a priest assigned to his parish. That unnamed priest had been accused of sexually assaulting a minor in 1982. In response, Bevilacqua ordered Picard to apologize to the priest and spend two weeks on a contemplative retreat. The other priest was transferred to another parish. In response to Picard's allegation, the archdiocese said it had received no complaints about the accused priest's work in 15 years of service to three parishes. That priest died in 2006.

==== Bevilacqua abuse allegation ====
In September 2018, the Diocese of Pittsburgh was sued by Heather Taylor, a former student at St. Gabriel of the Sorrowful Virgin School near Pittsburgh. Taylor claimed that Bevilacqua, then bishop of Pittsburgh, had groped her while visiting St. Gabriel. She also accused two other priests on the school faculty of molesting her, both of whom were found to have sexually abused minors.

== Viewpoints ==
=== Abortion ===
In 2004, Bevilacqua praised the banning of abortion services for women in US military hospitals by Congress. In 2009, Bevilacqua joined other American bishops in condemning the University of Notre Dame for inviting US President Barack Obama to be its commencement speaker. This was due to Obama's support for abortion rights. Bevilacqua commented:

It is my hope and prayer that the University of Notre Dame will rescind the invitation to President Obama to speak at the commencement and withhold the conferral of an honorary degree to him or to anyone who so blatantly disregards the basic moral principles upon which the United States of America was founded.

=== Capital punishment ===
In 2000, Bevilacqua testified before the Pennsylvania General Assembly in support of a bill that would enact a moratorium on capital punishment in that state.

=== LGBTQ rights ===
Bevilacqua was a frequent critic of LGBTQ rights, calling it an "...aberration, moral evil...". He also believed that gay men should not be accepted as Catholic priests.

Catholic Church titles
Preceded by John Krol	Archbishop of Philadelphia; 1987–2003	Succeeded by Justin Rigali
Preceded by Vincent Martin Leonard	Bishop of Pittsburgh; 1983–1987	Succeeded by Donald Wuerl
Preceded by –	Auxiliary Bishop of Brooklyn; 1980–1983	Succeeded by –
