= Nicholas C. Dattilo =

Roman Catholic Church bishop (1932–2004)

His Excellency, The Most Reverend Nicholas Carmen Dattilo
- Bishop of Harrisburg
- Church: Roman Catholic Church
- See: Harrisburg
- In office: January 26, 1990 – March 5, 2004 (died in office)
- Predecessor: William Henry Keeler
- Successor: Kevin C. Rhoades

Orders
- Ordination: May 31, 1958 by John Francis Dearden
- Consecration: January 26, 1990 by Anthony Bevilacqua

Personal details
- Born: March 8, 1932 Mahoningtown, Pennsylvania, US
- Died: March 5, 2004 (aged 71) Camp Hill, Pennsylvania, US
- Education: St. Vincent Seminary; St. Charles Borromeo Seminary

Nicholas Carmen Dattilo (March 8, 1932 – March 5, 2004) was an American prelate of the Roman Catholic Church. He served as bishop of the Diocese of Harrisburg in Pennsylvania from 1990 until his death in 2004.

== Biography ==
=== Early life ===
The oldest of six children, Nicholas Dattilo was born on March 8, 1932, in Mahoningtown, Pennsylvania, to Frank and Emma (née Nocera) Dattilo. He studied for the priesthood at St. Vincent Seminary in Latrobe, Pennsylvania, and St. Charles Borromeo Seminary in Wynnewood, Pennsylvania.

=== Priesthood ===
Dattilo was ordained to the priesthood for the Diocese of Pittsburgh on May 31, 1958 in Pittsburgh by Cardinal John Francis Dearden. After his ordination, the diocese assigned Dattilo as a parochial vicar at St. Patrick Parish in Canonsburg, Pennsylvania. Until 1971, also briefly serving at St. Colman Parish in Turtle Creek, Pennsylvania. He named pastor of Madonna del Castello Parish in Swissvale, Pennsylvania in 1971 and of St. Vitus Parish in New Castle, Pennsylvania, in 1981. In 1985, Dattilo was appointed secretary for clergy and pastoral life for the diocese, later becoming its vicar general.

=== Bishop of Harrisburg ===
On November 21, 1989, Dattilo was appointed the eighth bishop of Harrisburg by Pope John Paul II. He received his episcopal consecration on January 26, 1990, from Archbishop Anthony Bevilacqua, with Bishops William Keeler and Donald Wuerl serving as co-consecrators, at St. Patrick's Cathedral in Harrisburg.

As bishop, Dattilo began a three-year Consultations Process to assess the needs and resources of the local church in preparation for the next century. This resulted in a major reorganization of parishes and missions, because of populations shifts within the fifteen counties of the diocese. During Dattilo's tenure, the number of parishes was reduced from 120 to 89, resulting in 23 appeals to the Vatican and years of parishioner protests.

In 1998, Dattilo established the Ecclesial Lay Ministry Program, a three-year formation program to prepare trained lay leaders. Following the closure of Villa Vianney, he approved construction of a new residence for retired priests in 1999. He also finalized plans for a diocesan conference center, with the groundbreaking ceremony in October 1999.

=== Death and legacy ===
Dattilo was hospitalized in February 2004 for kidney failure, diabetes and heart and respiratory problems. Nicholas Dattilo died at Holy Spirit Hospital in Camp Hill, Pennsylvania, three days before his 72nd birthday. His funeral mass was celebrated at Good Shepherd Church in Camp Hill, as St. Patrick's Cathedral was undergoing renovations.

On August 1, 2018, Bishop Ronald Gainer, Dattilo's successor as bishop of Harrisburg, announced that the names of every bishop of Harrisburg from 1947 onward—including Dattilo's -- would be removed from any building or room in the diocese named in their honor, due to their failure to protect victims from abuse.

Catholic Church titles
Preceded by William Henry Keeler	Bishop of Harrisburg; 1990–2004	Succeeded by Kevin C. Rhoades
