= Vincent Leonard =

American prelate

His Excellency, The Most Reverend Vincent Martin Leonard
- Bishop of Pittsburgh; Titular Bishop of Arsacal
- Church: Roman Catholic Church
- See: Diocese of Pittsburgh
- Predecessor: John Joseph Wright
- Successor: Anthony Joseph Bevilacqua
- Other post: Titular Bishop of Arsacal

Orders
- Ordination: June 16, 1935 by Hugh C. Boyle
- Consecration: April 21, 1964 by John Wright

Personal details
- Born: December 11, 1908 Pittsburgh, Pennsylvania, US
- Died: September 28, 1994 (aged 85) Pittsburgh, Pennsylvania, US
- Education: Duquesne University; St. Vincent Seminary
- Motto: That I may gain Christ

Styles of Vincent Leonard
- Reference style: The Most Reverend
- Spoken style: Your Excellency
- Religious style: Bishop
- Posthumous style: none

Vincent Martin Leonard (December 11, 1908 – August 28, 1994) was an American prelate of the Catholic Church. He served as bishop of the Diocese of Pittsburgh in Pennsylvania from 1969 to 1983.

== Biography ==
=== Early life ===
Vincent Leonard was born on December 11, 1908, in Pittsburgh, Pennsylvania, one of nine children of Francis and Catherine (née Dolan) Leonard. His father worked in the steel mills. He was raised in the Hill District neighborhood of Pittsburgh, and received his early education at the parochial school of St. Brigid Parish. After graduating from Duquesne University Preparatory School, he studied at Duquesne University in Pittsburgh and then at St. Vincent Seminary in Latrobe, Pennsylvania.

=== Priesthood ===
Leonard was ordained to the priesthood in Latrobe for the Diocese of Pittsburgh by Bishop Hugh C. Boyle on June 16, 1935. After his ordination, the diocese assigned Leonard as assistant chaplain at Mercy Hospital in Pittsburgh, where he remained for two years. From 1937 to 1950, he served as resident chaplain of Allegheny County Home and Woodville State Hospital in Collier Township, Pennsylvania

In 1950, Leonard was named assistant chancellor of the diocese and chancellor in 1951. He was appointed vicar general in 1959. In addition to these duties, Boyle served as pastor of St. Patrick Parish in the Strip District (1955–1967) and of St. Philip Parish in Crafton, Pennsylvania (1967–1969). He was named a domestic prelate by Pope Pius XII in 1952.

=== Auxiliary Bishop and Bishop of Pittsburgh ===
On February 28, 1964, Leonard was appointed as an auxiliary bishop of Pittsburgh and titular bishop of Arsacal by Pope Paul VI. He received his episcopal consecration at Saint Paul Cathedral in Pittsburgh on April 21, 1964, from Bishop John Wright, with Bishops Richard Henry Ackerman and William G. Connare serving as co-consecrators. He selected as his episcopal motto: Ut Christum Lucrifaciam ("That I may gain Christ").

After Bishop Wright was named to head the Congregation for the Clergy, Leonard was appointed the ninth bishop of Pittsburgh on June 1, 1969. During his tenure, he became one of the first bishops in the United States to make his diocesan financial reports public. He also established a due-process system to allow Catholics to appeal any administrative decision they believed was a violation of canon law. In 1974, Leonard threatened three priests with disciplinary action for giving the eucharist in the hand when it was not yet permitted in the United States. He also served on the Pro-Life Committee of the National Conference of Catholic Bishops and on the Health Affairs Committee of the United States Catholic Conference.

=== Retirement and legacy ===
Pope John Paul II accepted Leonard's resignation as bishop of Pittsburgh on June 30, 1983, due to arthritis. Vincent Leonard died on August 28, 1994, from pneumonia at the Little Sisters of the Poor Home in Pittsburgh, at age 85. He is buried in Calvary Cemetery in the Hazelwood neighborhood of Pittsburgh.

Catholic Church titles
Preceded by John Joseph Wright	Bishop of Pittsburgh; 1969–1983	Succeeded by Anthony Joseph Bevilacqua
