= James J. Egan =

American architect

- Born: 1839; Cork, Ireland
- Died: December 2, 1914 (aged 74–75); Chicago, Illinois, US
- Burial place: Calvary Cemetery
- Known for: Architect

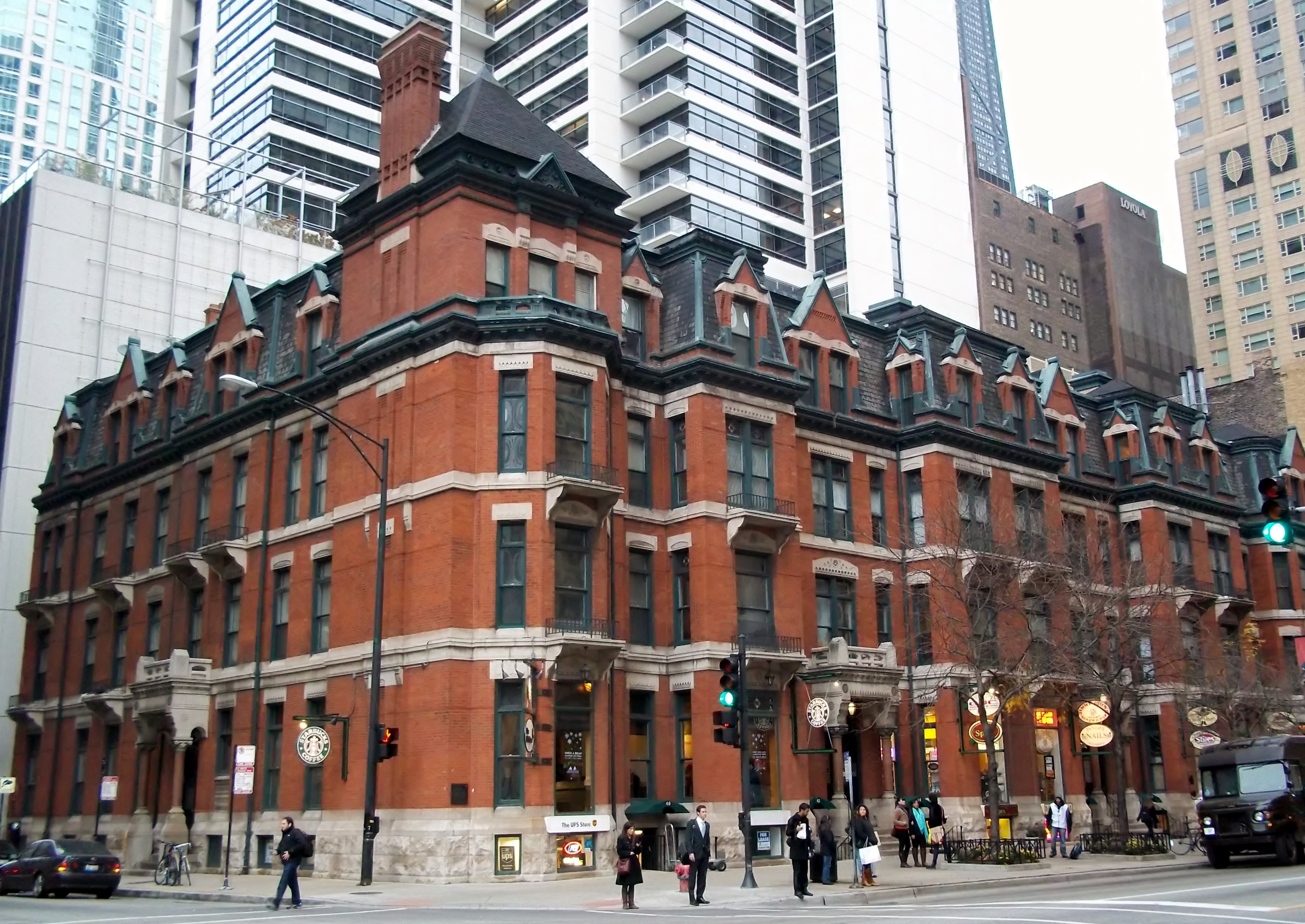
Hotel St Benedict Flats

James J. Egan, FAIA, (1839 – December 2, 1914) was an Irish-American architect and fellow of the American Institute of Architects practicing in Chicago, Illinois. He was a partner of the Chicago architectural firms Armstrong & Egan, Egan & Kirkland and Egan & Prindeville, which gained prominence designing Catholic structures.

== Early life ==
Born in Cork, Ireland, Egan was educated at a private academy in Cork, Ireland before graduating from the Government School of Design, Queens College, Cork. He also studied in England before emigrating in 1864. He arrived at Castle Garden, New York City and found work as a draftsman for Richard Upjohn. He continued his training under Charles W. Clinton who had previously trained with Upjohn, and was "one of the most refined designers in the Renaissance styles". He also worked under Clinton's sometime associate Edward Tuckerman Potter of Schenectady, New York, whose tastes leaned toward Gothic Revival.

== Chicago ==
He relocated to Chicago, Illinois shortly after the great fire in 1871, where he became heavily involved in reconstruction. He also developed strong personal connections with leaders in the Chicago Roman Catholic Church, and received the commission for St. Vincent de Paul Church in Lincoln Park. He and formed several partnerships with fellow architects.

John M. Armstrong was born around 1840 on a farm at Kinzie and Wells Streets. He was a councilman at the age of twenty and is credited with the relocation of the city's first cemetery to make way for Lincoln Park. Around 1874, Egan went into partnership with Armstrong, forming the firm of Armstrong & Egan which designed the City Hall/County Building (1874). Disagreements arose between the City Council and the County Board, with each pursuing their respective portion of the project separately.

Henry W. Hill was born in Elmshorn, Germany and attended the Inst. of Technology ad Polytechnicum in Hamburg. He arrived in Chicago in March 1872 and was employed in the offices of a number of leading architects. Hill worked for Armstrong & Egan on the courthouse project. From 1875 to 1881 Egan partnered with Hill, in the firm Egan & Hill. In 1881, Hill went into partnership with Augustus Bauer. Hill retired to Holstein, Germany in 1914.

=== Egan & Kirkland ===
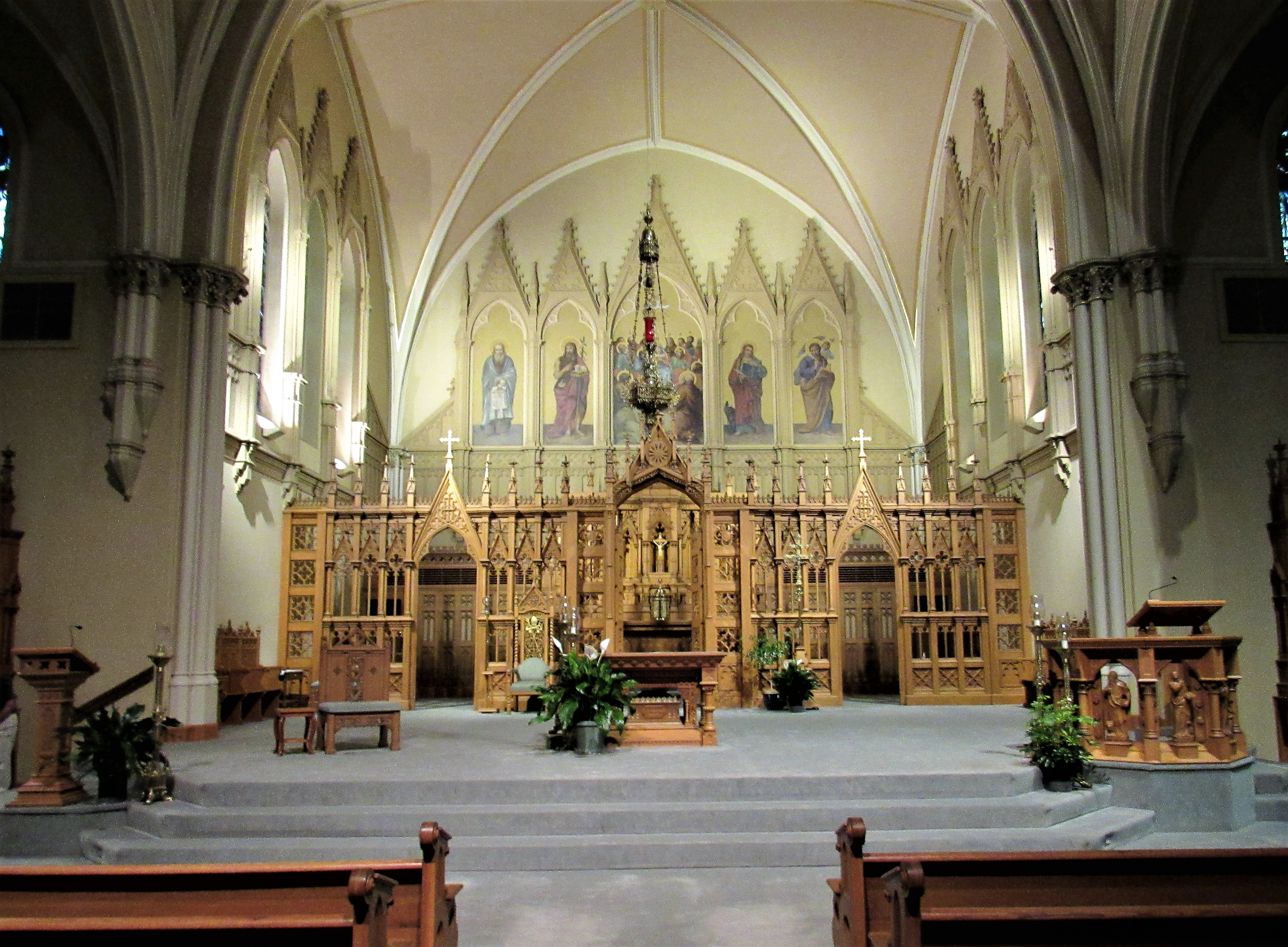
Interior of St. Raphael's Cathedral, Dubuque

In 1882, he formed a partnership with Alex Kirkland. Kirkland had previously served as Supervising Architect on Armstrong & Egan's City Hall/County Building project.

- Hotel St. Benedict Flats, 801 North Wabash Street (1882–1883), a four-story building of luxury apartments on Chicago Avenue at Wabash.
- Church of St. Thomas the Apostle (1885), Beloit, Wisconsin.
- St. Raphael's Cathedral in Dubuque, Iowa (1886 interior renovation)
- St. Mary's Church, Clinton, Iowa (1888, demolished in 2009),
- St. Mary of the Assumption Cathedral in San Francisco, California (1891, destroyed by fire in 1962)
- Sacred Heart Cathedral in Davenport, Iowa (1891)
- St. Ambrose Cathedral in Des Moines, Iowa (1891)
- St. Patrick's Roman Catholic Church in Milwaukee, Wisconsin (1893)
- St. Paul's Church in Burlington, Iowa (1895)

=== Egan & Prindeville ===
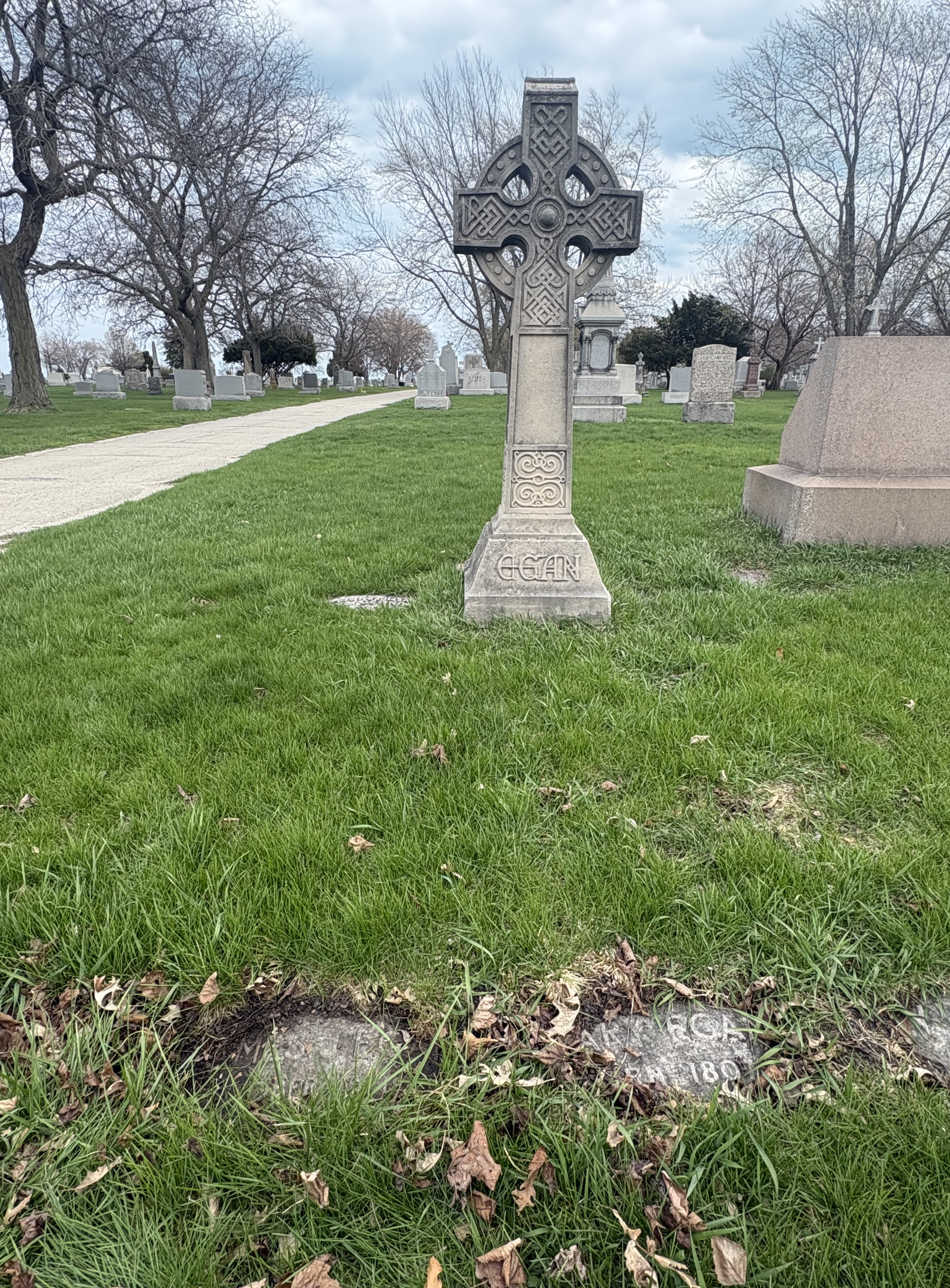
Egan's grave at Calvary Cemetery

Egan formed the firm "Egan & Prindeville" with Charles H. Prindeville. It gained prominence building Roman Catholic churches and other structures, including the cathedral church of the Roman Catholic Diocese of Pittsburgh, St. Paul Cathedral (1906). Egan was made a Fellow of the American Institute of Architects in 1913.

He died in Chicago on December 2, 1914, and was buried at Calvary Cemetery in Evanston.

The firm continued under Charles Prindeville after Egan's death.

- St. Francis de Sales Church (1899, demolished), Keokuk, Iowa
- St. Vincent de Paul Church in Chicago (1897)
- St. Paul Cathedral in Pittsburgh, Pennsylvania (1906), as Egan & Prindeville
- St. Bridget Church Chicago, Il (1906; demolished, 1992)
- St. Pius V Church, Pilsen neighborhood, Chicago, IL

== Gallery ==
Structures designed by James J. Egan

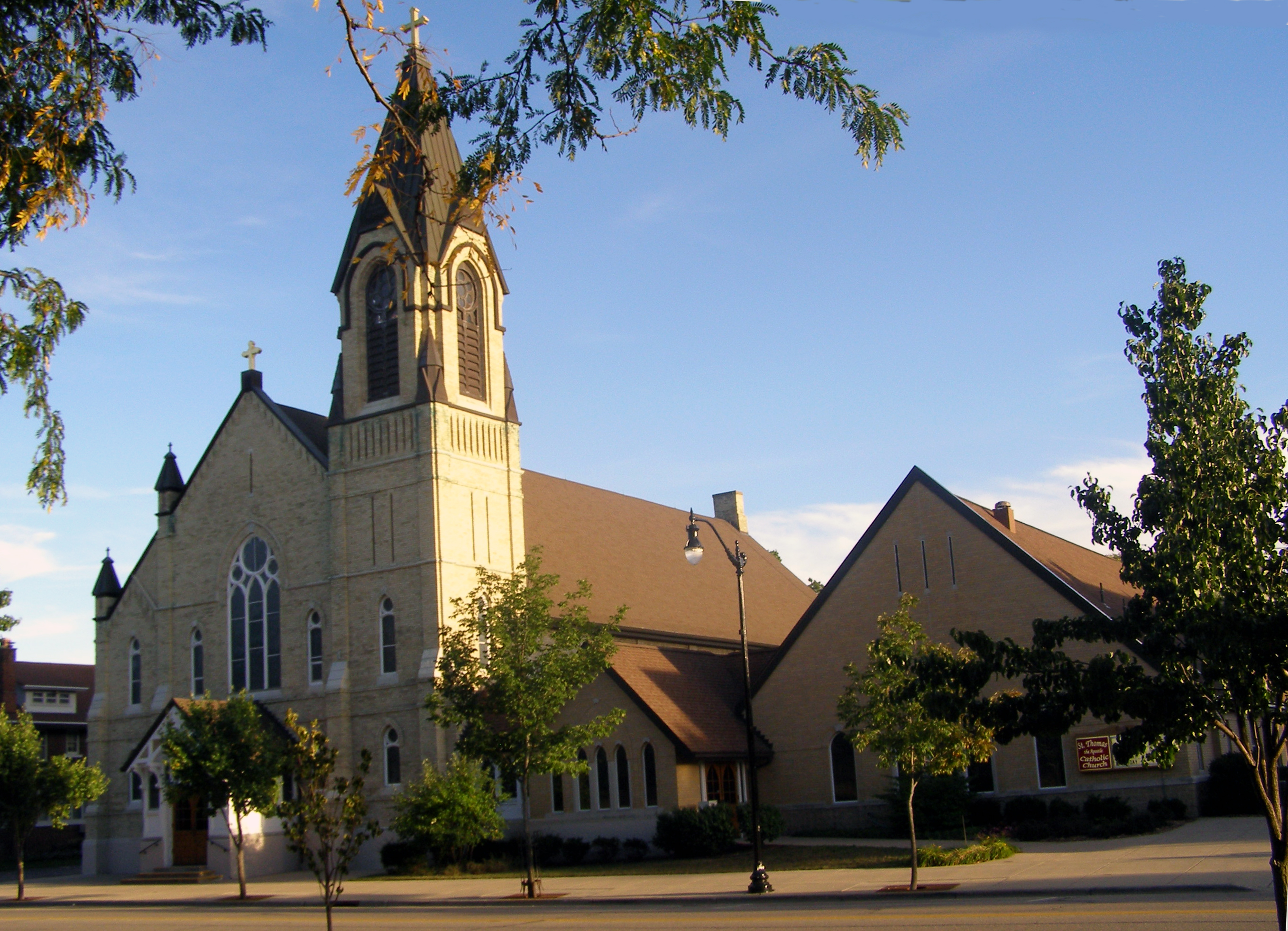
Church of St. Thomas the Apostle (Beloit, Wisconsin), 1885

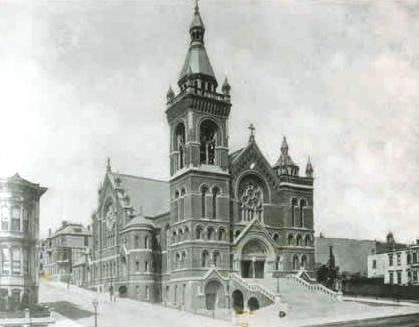
St. Mary of the Assumption Cathedral (San Francisco, California), 1891

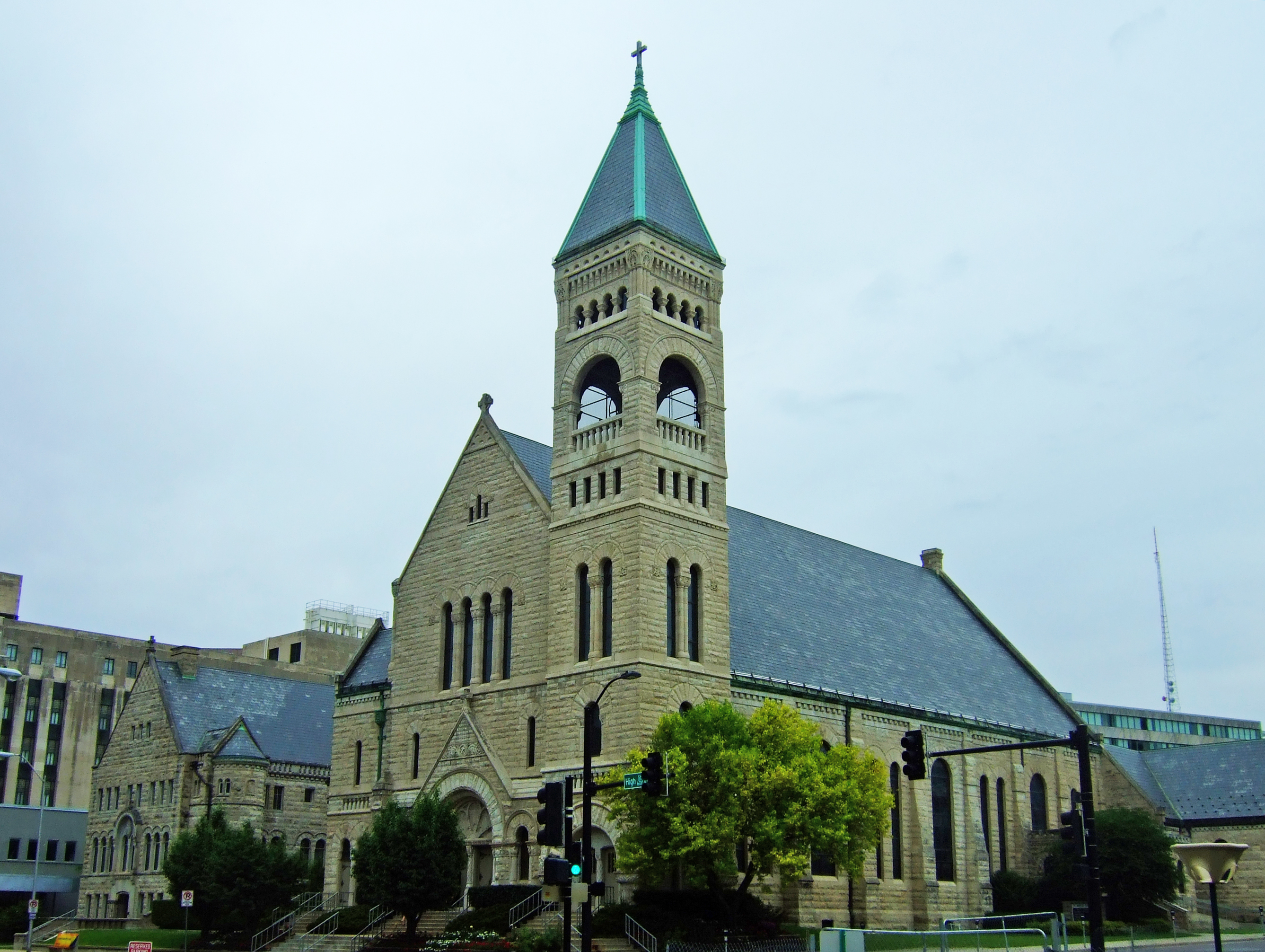
St Ambrose Cathedral (Des Moines, Iowa), 1891

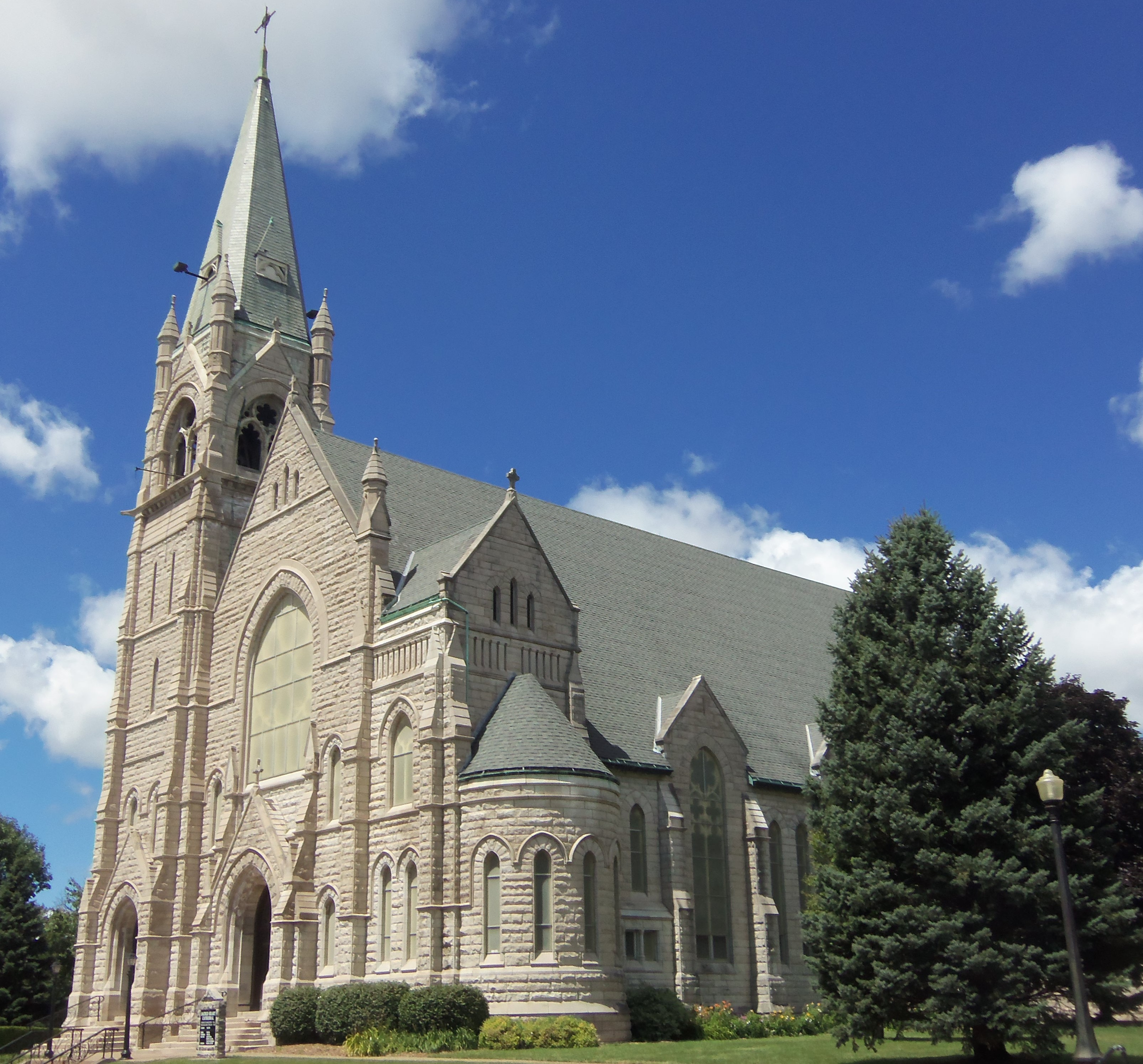
Sacred Heart Cathedral (Davenport, Iowa), 1891

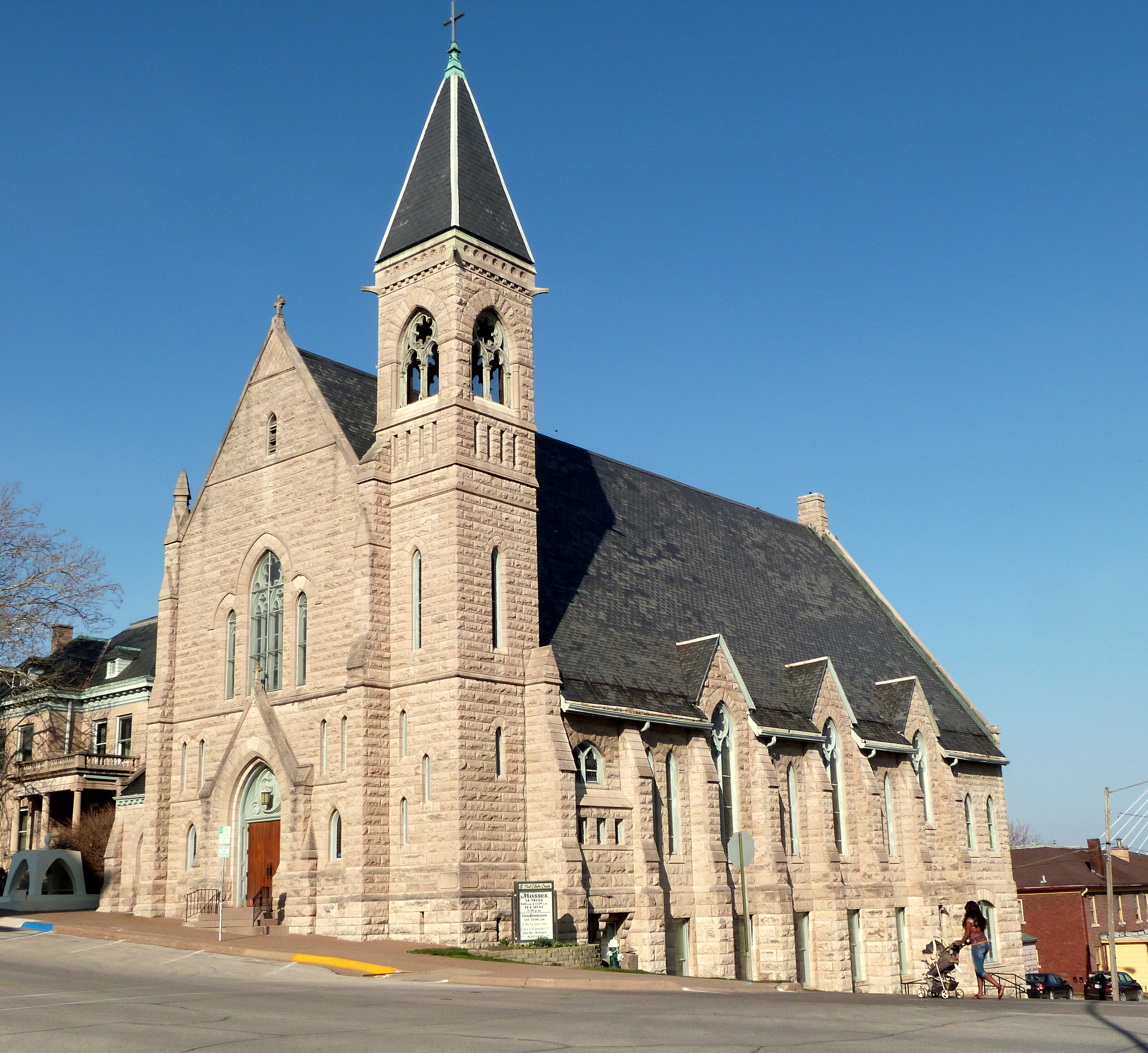
St Paul's Catholic Church (Burlington, Iowa), 1895

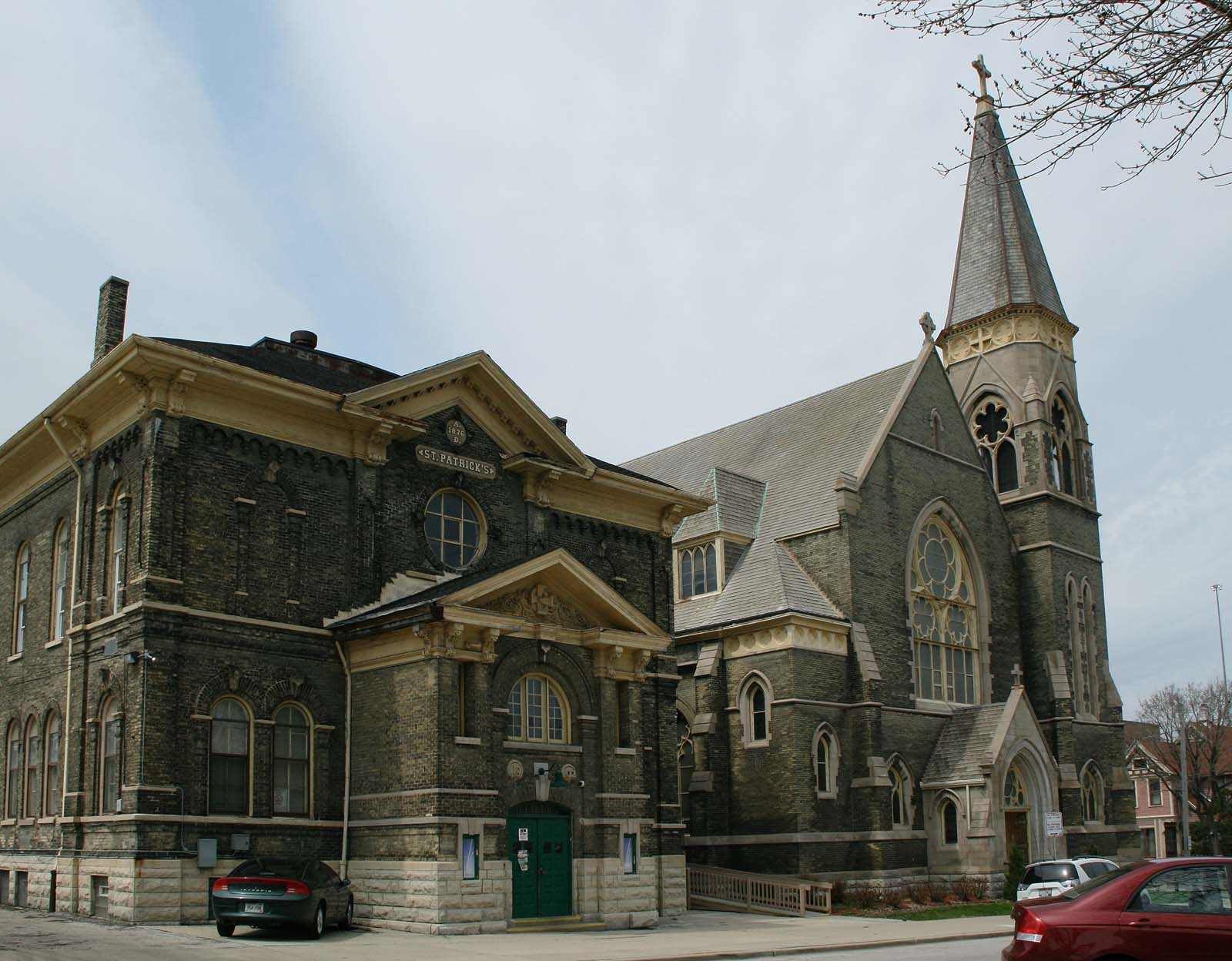
St. Patrick's Catholic Church (Milwaukee, Wisconsin), 1895

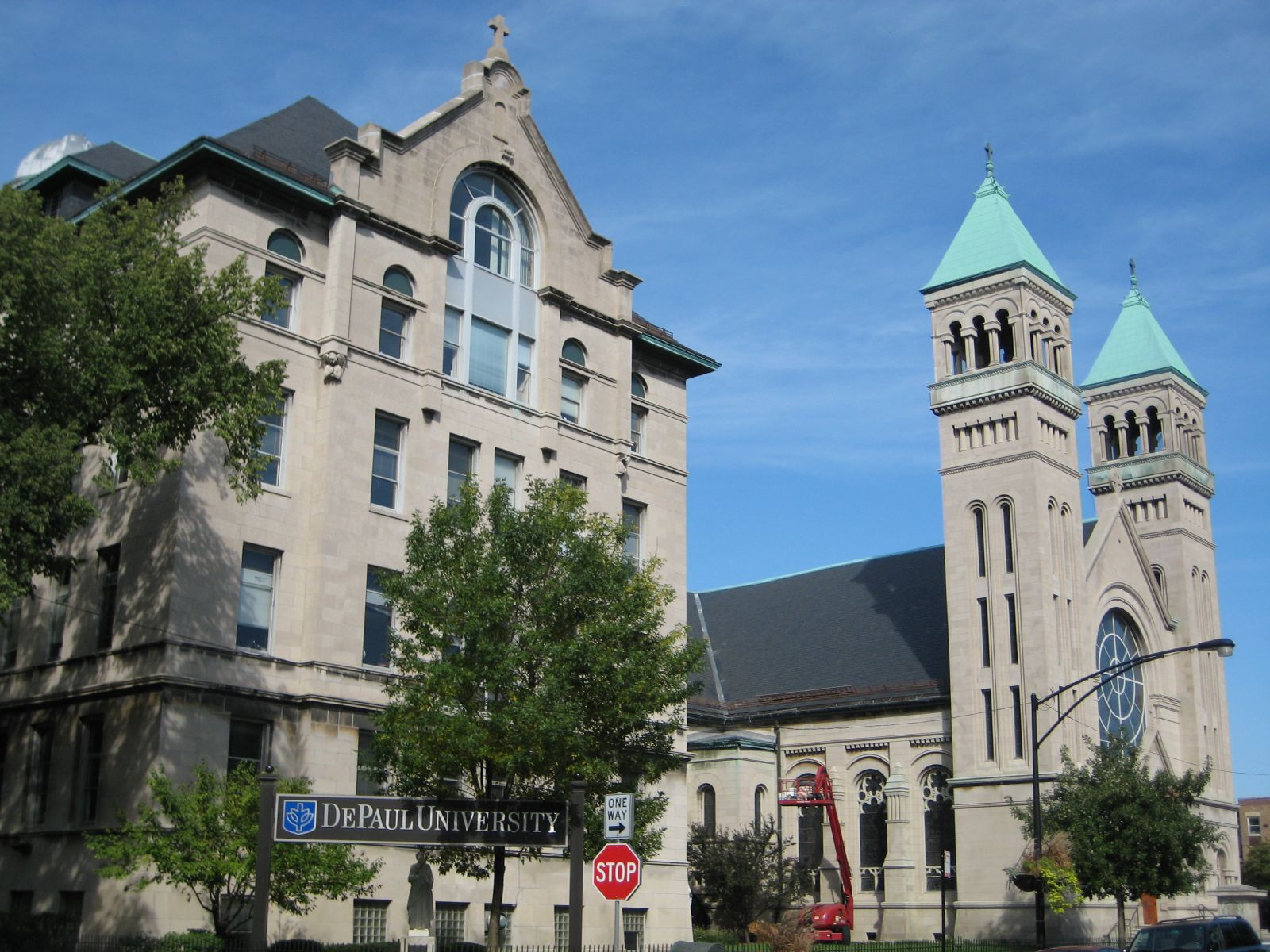
St. Vincent de Paul Church (Chicago, Illinois), 1897

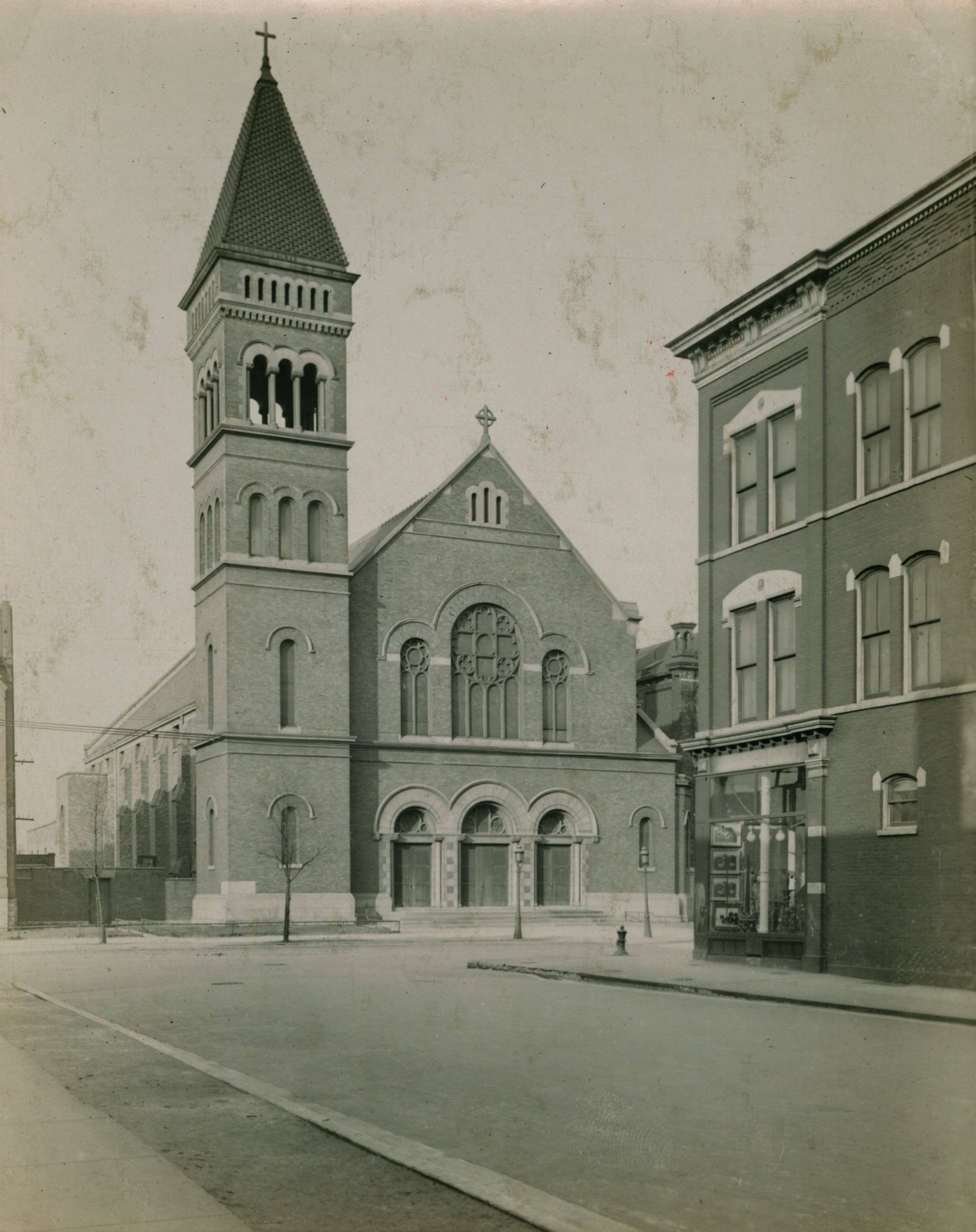
St. Bridget Catholic Church (Chicago, Illinois), 1906

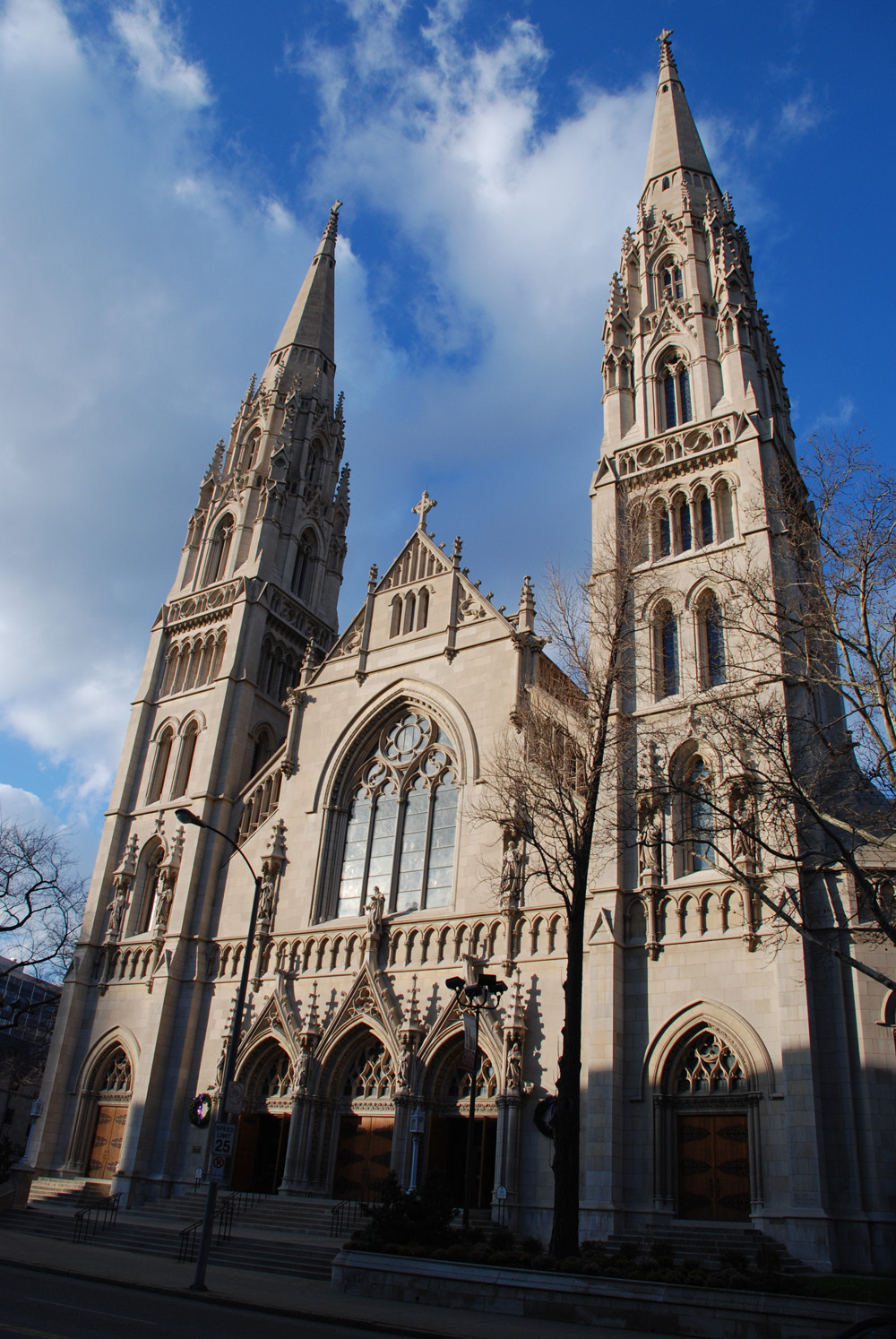
St. Paul Cathedral (Pittsburgh, Pennsylvania), 1906
