= St. Vincent de Paul Church (Chicago) =

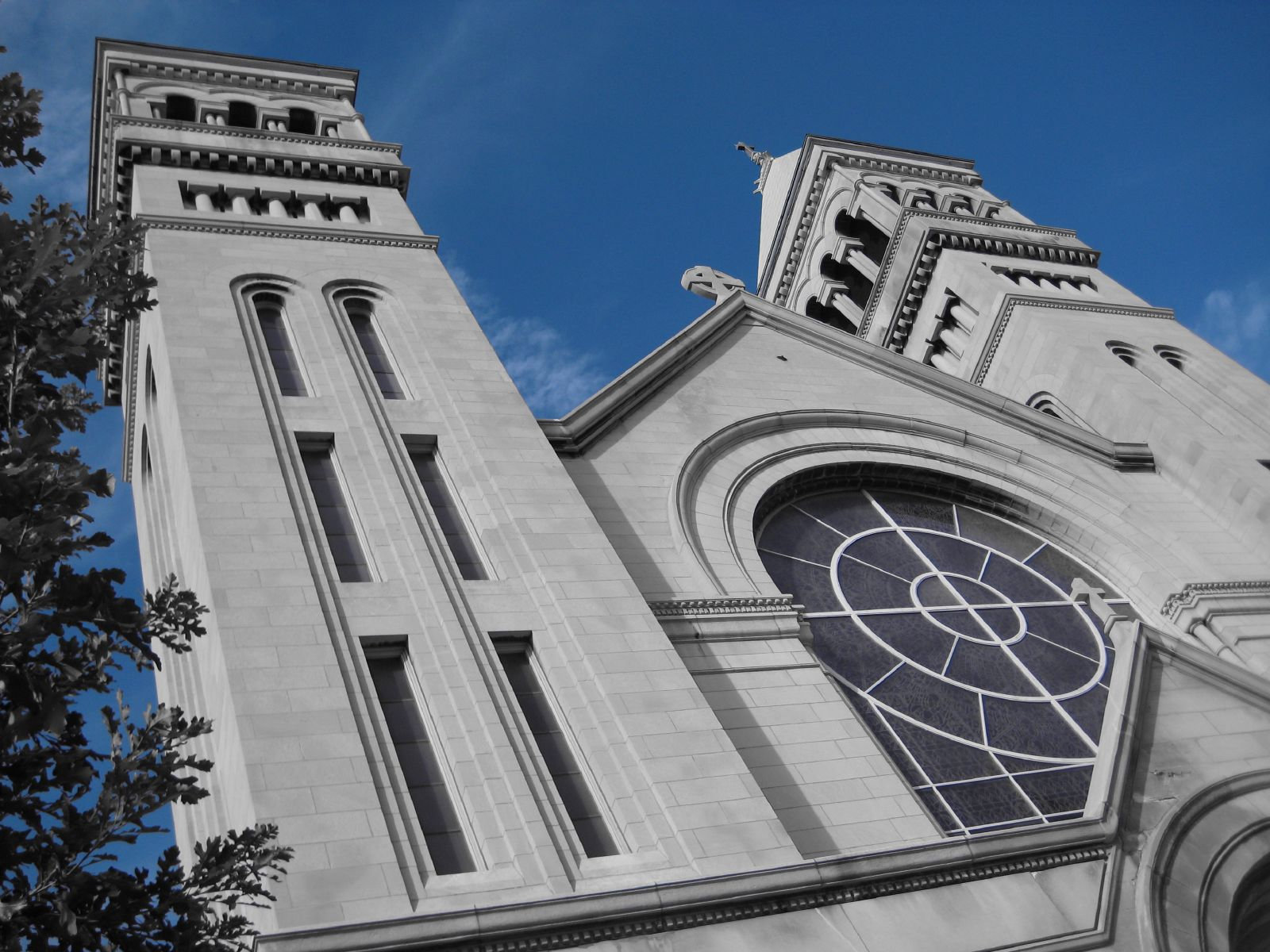
- Facade of St. Vincent de Paul Church

- 41°55′19.67″N 87°39′14.43″W
- Location: 1010 W Webster Ave. Chicago, Illinois
- Country: United States
- Denomination: Roman Catholic
- Website: St. Vincent de Paul Parish

History
- Status: Parish church
- Founded: 1875
- Founder: Congregation of the Mission
- Dedication: St. Vincent de Paul
- Dedicated: May 1, 1897

Architecture
- Functional status: Active
- Architect: James J. Egan
- Architectural type: Church
- Style: Romanesque

Specifications
- Materials: Indiana Limestone

Administration
- Province: Chicago
- Archdiocese: Chicago

Clergy
- Pastor(s): Father Derek Swanson, C.M.

St. Vincent de Paul Church is a historic parish church in Chicago, Illinois. The parish was founded by the Vincentians in 1875 and is affiliated with their school, DePaul University, on whose campus it sits. The church is located in the Archdiocese of Chicago.

== History ==
First known as "Father Smith's Farm", St. Vincent de Paul Parish was founded by Rev. Edward Smith, C.M., in 1875 at the corner of Webster Avenue and Osgood Street (now Kenmore Avenue) for German and Irish Catholics. This multi-use structure served as the church, school, parish hall, and rectory until 1891, when St. Vincent's School was established in a separate building.

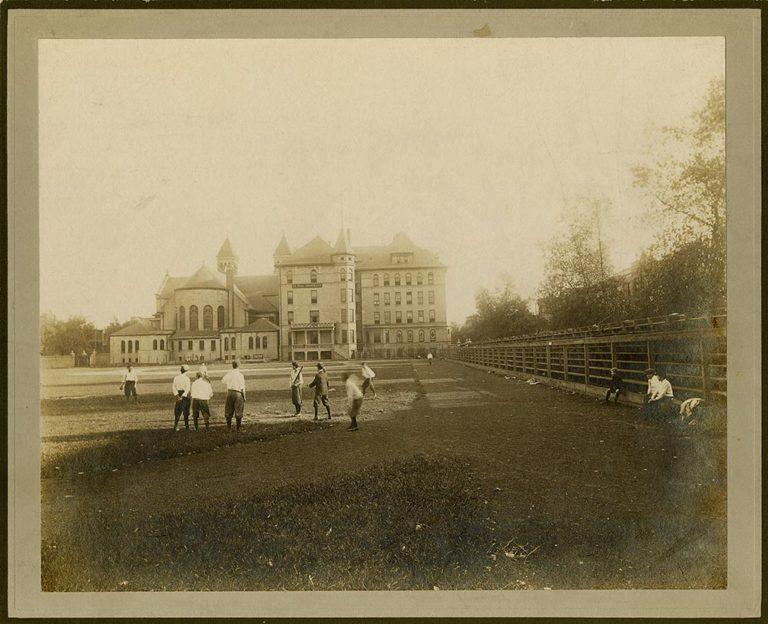
"St. Vincent's Field" with St. Vincent's Church in the background c. 1900

With the original building now largely vacated, the structure was heavily remodeled, adding a third floor, and was repurposed as the home of the new St. Vincent's College in 1898. This school later became DePaul University.

After the school's opening, planning started on the current church building at Webster and Sheffield Avenues. The new St. Paul's Church was dedicated on May 1, 1897 by Patrick Feehan, Archbishop of Chicago.

== Architecture ==
The new church was designed by James J. Egan of the firm of Egan & Prindeville, in the Romanesque Revival style with Gothic touches. The church is constructed of Indiana limestone and is considered representative of his best work. Its twin towers stand 140 feet tall.

=== Interior ===
Four large columns are used at the intersection of the nave and the transepts allowing for an uninterrupted view of the sanctuary, a somewhat unusual approach at the time. The stained glass is by Mayer & Company of Munich, Germany. The window in the west transept depicts Saint Vincent de Paul, patron of the church and founder of the Congregation of the Mission. The east transept window depicts Christ the King.

A new south rose window was created by Conrad Schmitt Studios of New Berlin, Wisconsin to replace the original destroyed in a fire in 1955. The twenty-two foot window "was designed with the theme ‘Sun of Splendor,’ symbolizing God and the blessings that radiate from him. Eight doves represent the beatitudes, while twelve angels holding stars symbolize the twelve divine praises."

John A. Mallin painted the ceiling of the apse. The Carrara marble altar was designed by Augustine O'Callahan and features inlaid mother-of-pearl and mosaics. The altar displays lilies, acanthus leaves, passion flowers, and shafts of wheat carved by Carl Beil.

== Bibliography ==
- Sinkevitch, Alice (2004). The AIA Guide to Chicago. Harvest Books.
- Schulze, Franz; Harrington, Kevin (2003). Chicago's Famous Buildings. University Of Chicago Press.
- McNamara, Denis R. (2005). Heavenly City: The Architectural Tradition of Catholic Chicago. Liturgy Training Publications.
- Chiat, Marylin (2004). The Spiritual Traveler: Chicago and Illinois: A Guide to Sacred Sites and Peaceful Places. HiddenSpring.
- Lane, George A. (1982). Chicago Churches and Synagogues: An Architectural Pilgrimage. Loyola Press.
- Kantowicz, Edward R. (2007). The Archdiocese of Chicago: A Journey of Faith. Booklink.
- Kociolek, Jacek (2002). Kościoły Polskie w Chicago {Polish Churches of Chicago} (in Polish). Ex Libris.
