= St. Patrick's Roman Catholic Church (Milwaukee, Wisconsin) =

Historic church in Wisconsin, United States

- U.S. National Register of Historic Places
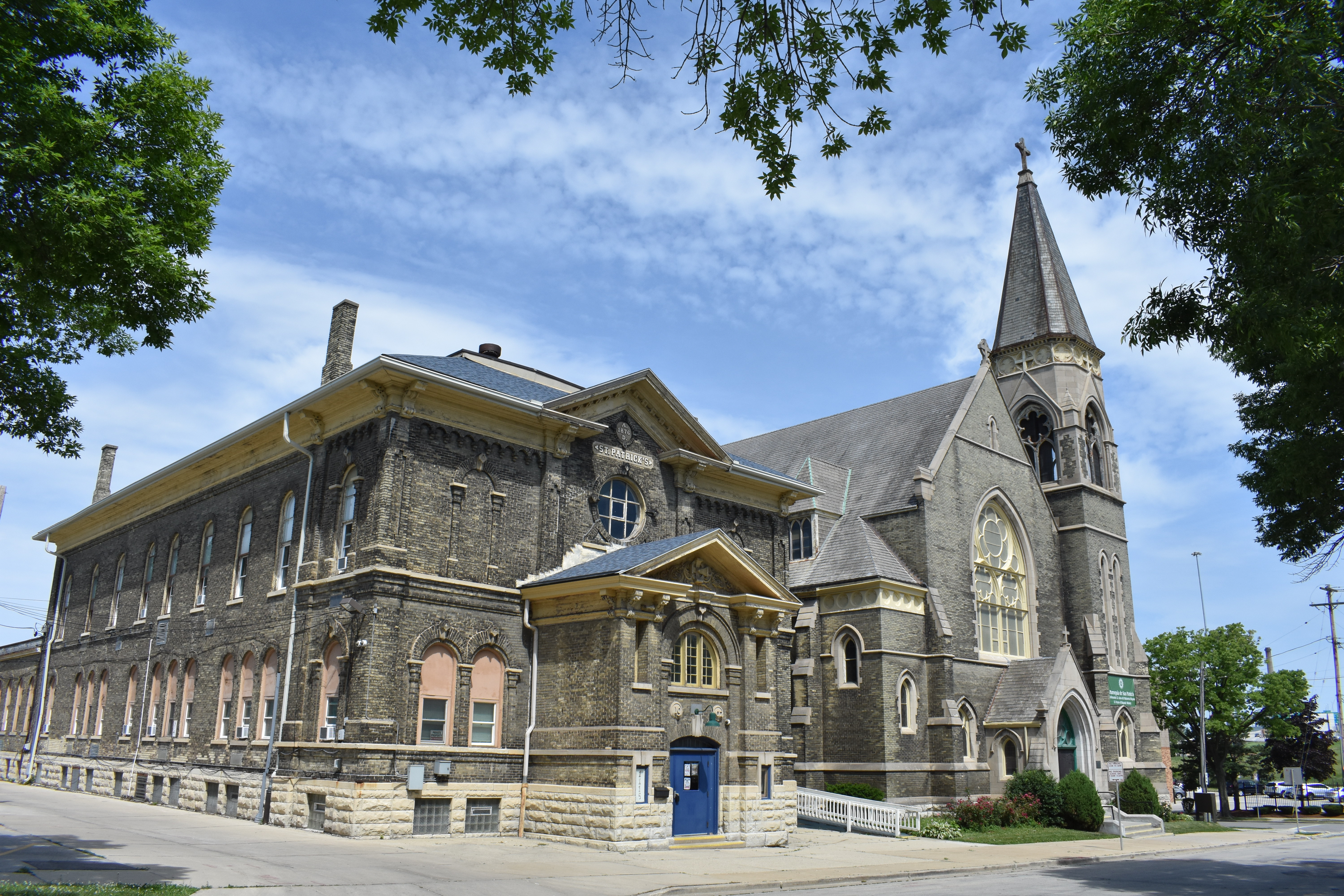
- St. Patrick's Roman Catholic Church
- Location: 1105 S. 7th St. Milwaukee, Wisconsin
- Coordinates: 43.01993°N 87.92006°W
- Built: 1893
- Architectural style: Gothic Revival
- NRHP reference No.: 74000109
- Added to NRHP: December 16, 1974

St. Patrick's Roman Catholic Church is a historic church built in 1893 at the corner of 7th and Washington Streets in Walker's Point on the near South Side of Milwaukee, Wisconsin - still very intact. The building was designated a city landmark in 1973 and added to the National Register of Historic Places the following year for its artistic and architectural significance.

== History ==
St. Patrick's parish was organized in 1876, the first English-speaking parish on the South Side. Its initial members were mostly Irish immigrants and their children, to later be joined by Germans and Poles. In 1876 they built a combination church and school - the 2-story brick building at left in the photo.

By the 1890s the parish was ready for a grander, larger building, and they hired James J. Egan of Chicago as architect. Eagan's design was built from 1893 to 1895 - a gable-roofed rectangular main block about 150 feet long along its east–west axis, about 70 feet wide, built of pressed brick and trimmed with Bedford limestone. A square tower stands at the northeast corner. The tower is flanked with corner buttresses and rises to a spire topped with a cross, 122 feet above the street. Centered beside the tower is the main entrance and above it is a large multi-pane window with six-circle shapes that echo a similar shape in the tower. Inside, the floor-plan is center-aisle, with the altar in an apse on the west end. A hammer-beam ceiling contains dormers with stained-glass clerestory windows imported from Austria. Sculptor Gaetano Trentanove carved the white marble sculpture of the Madonna and Child incorporated into the south altar.

Since 2006, the parish has been administered jointly with the nearby parish of Our Lady of Guadalupe, and the two share Jesuit clergy.
