= Hotel St. Benedict Flats =

Apartment building in Chicago, Illinois

- U.S. National Register of Historic Places
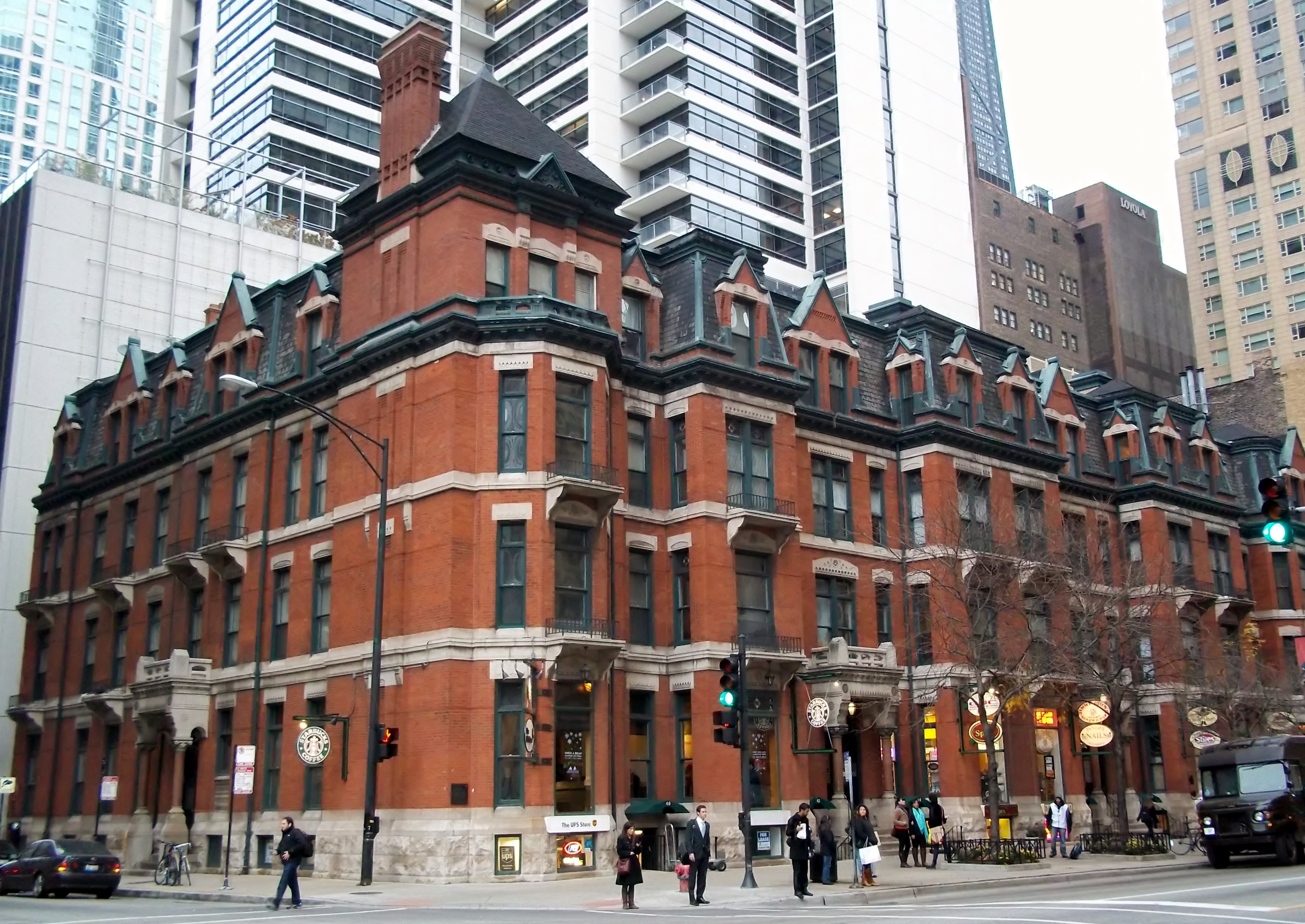

- Location within Illinois Location within the United States
- Location: 40, 42, 50 E. Chicago Ave., 801 N. Wabash Ave., Chicago, Illinois
- Coordinates: 41°53′49″N 87°37′35″W
- Area: less than one acre
- Built: 1882
- Built by: Sexton, Patrick J.
- Architect: Egan, James J.
- Architectural style: Victorian Gothic
- NRHP reference No.: 88003311
- Added to NRHP: September 1, 1995

Hotel St. Benedict Flats is a historic apartment building located at the northeast corner of Chicago Avenue and Wabash Avenue in the Near North Side neighborhood of Chicago, Illinois. Built in 1882, the building was one of the "French flat" luxury apartments constructed after the Great Chicago Fire; named for their resemblance to Parisian apartments, these new buildings brought apartment living to Chicago's upper class. Architect James J. Egan, an Irish Catholic better known for his church designs, designed the Victorian Gothic building. The building's decorative features, such as its lintels, art glass windows, and use of pressed metal, were common features of contemporary upper-class homes, while its mansard roofs evoked French architecture. Egan named the building for the property's previous owners, the Order of Saint Benedict; the "Hotel" portion of the name was added to exploit a legal loophole, as the building never served as a hotel.

The building was added to the National Register of Historic Places on September 1, 1995.
