= St. Paul Cathedral (Pittsburgh) =

Saint Paul Cathedral
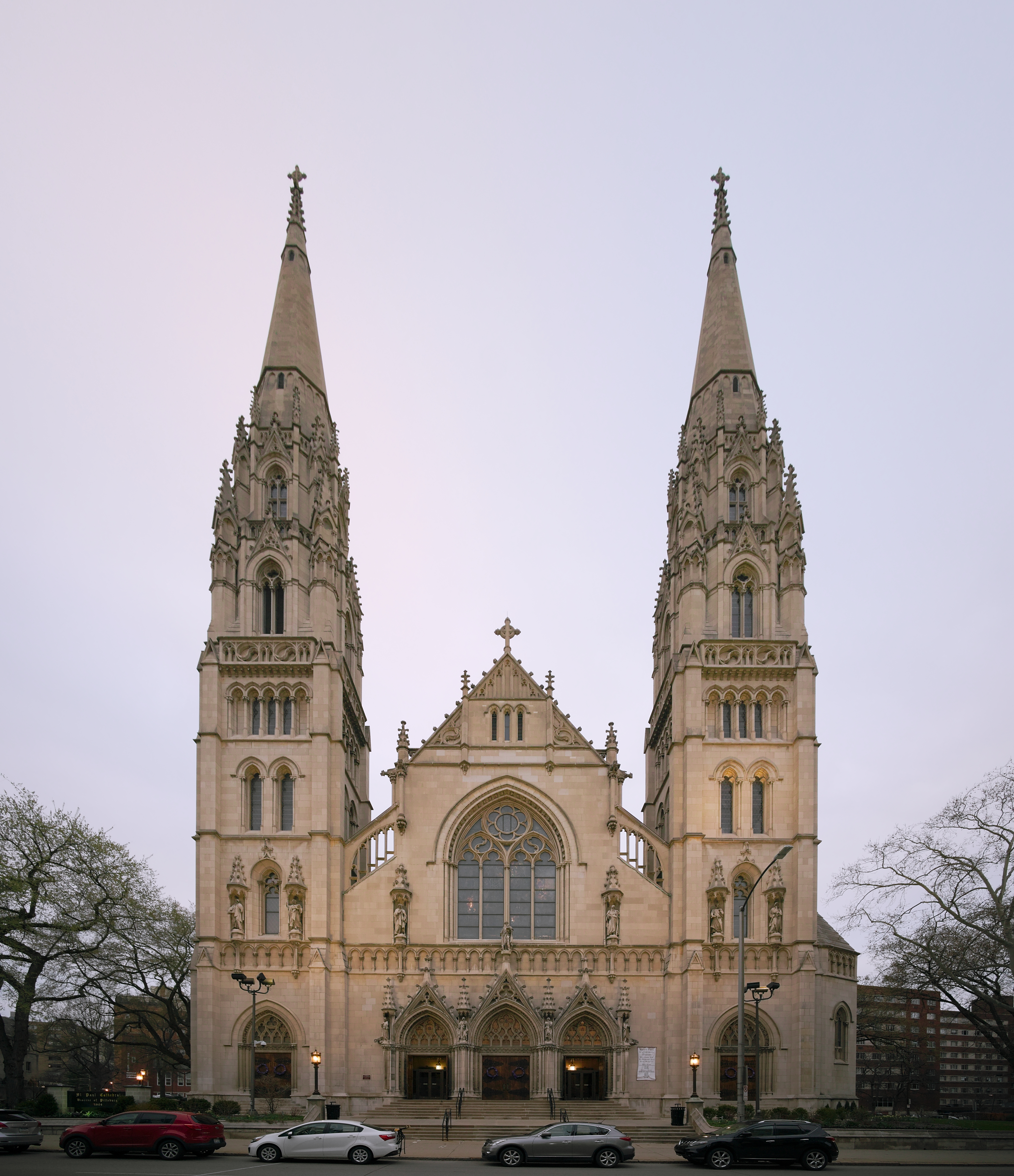

- Location within Pennsylvania Location within the United States
- 40°26′50.63″N 79°56′59.42″W
- Location: 108 N. Dithridge St. Pittsburgh, Pennsylvania
- Country: United States
- Denomination: Catholic
- Website: ghocatholics.org

History
- Founded: 1834

Architecture
- Architect: Egan and Prindeville
- Style: Gothic Revival
- Completed: 1906
- Construction cost: US$1.1 million (1906) or US$32,129,585.35 (2020)

Specifications
- Capacity: 2,600
- Height: 247 feet (75 m)
- Materials: Limestone

Administration
- Diocese: Pittsburgh

Clergy
- Bishop: Most Rev. Mark Eckman
- Rector: Very Rev. Kris D. Stubna, STD
- St. Paul Cathedral
- U.S. Historic district – Contributing property
- Pittsburgh Landmark – PHLF
- Part of: Schenley Farms Historic District (ID83002213)

Significant dates
- Added to NRHP: July 22, 1983
- Designated PHLF: 1975

Saint Paul Cathedral is the mother church of the Diocese of Pittsburgh in Pittsburgh, Pennsylvania, in the United States.

St. Paul Parish was established in Pittsburgh in 1833. When the Diocese of Pittsburgh was erected in 1843, St Paul's became its first cathedral. The first cathedral, destroyed by fire in 1851, was replaced in 1855 by the second cathedral. The third and current St. Paul's Cathedral was consecrated in 1906. It seats approximately 3,000 worshipers

== History ==
=== St. Paul's Church ===
St. Paul's Cathedral traces its history to St. Paul Church in Pittsburgh. At that time, the Pittsburgh area was under the jurisdiction of the Diocese of Philadelphia and had only one parish, St. Patrick's. Needing a second parish in the city, the Catholic community laid the cornerstone for St. Paul's Church in 1829; it wash was dedicated in 1833. The new church was located on Grant Street in downtown. When Pope Gregory XVI erected the Diocese of Pittsburgh in 1843, St. Paul's Church became the first St. Paul's Cathedral.

=== First St. Paul's Cathedral ===
During the 1840s, the City of Pittsburgh started digging out the streets around St. Paul's Cathedral to lower their grade. This left the cathedral 30 feet (9.1 m) above street level. In addition, the cathedral foundations were undermined by the street alterations. In 1850, the diocese decided to demolish the current building and construct a new cathedral at the lower street level.

However, before the project could start, the first St. Paul's Cathedral was destroyed by fire in May 1851. The cornerstone for a new St. Paul's Cathedral was laid on the site of the burned cathedral on June 1851 and the basement was completed in 1853.

=== Second St. Paul's Cathedral ===
The second St. Paul's Cathedral was consecrated in 1855. As the downtown area was claimed by industries, the residential areas shifted to other areas of the city. By the beginning of the 20th century, the diocese needed a third new cathedral to accommodate its rapid growth. It sold the Grant Street property to the industrialist Henry Clay Frick and purchased land in the Oakland neighborhood of Pittsburgh for the new structure.

Bishop Richard Phelan hired the architects Egan and Prindeville of Chicago to design the new cathedral. They used Cologne Cathedral in Cologne, Germany, as their inspiration. The contractor for the project was Thomas Reilly of Philadelphia.The cornerstone for the third St. Paul's Cathedral was laid in 1903.

=== Third St. Paul's Cathedral ===
The third and current St. Paul's Cathedral was dedicated in 1906. It became a contributing property in the Schenley Farms Historic District on the National Register of Historic Places in 1983.Between 2005 and 2007, the diocese renovated the cathedral for the first time.

The diocese in 2020 undertook a major exterior renovation of the cathedral. Restoration work was performed on the stone facing, the roof and the stained glass windows.That same year, due to declines in church enrollment and the number of priests, the diocese merged the St. Paul Cathedral Parish with St. Regis, St. Rosalia and St. Stephen Parishes.

Since its dedication, St. Paul's Cathedral has been visited by Cardinal Karol Wojtyla, Mother Theresa, and Bishop Fulton Sheen.

== Pipe organ ==
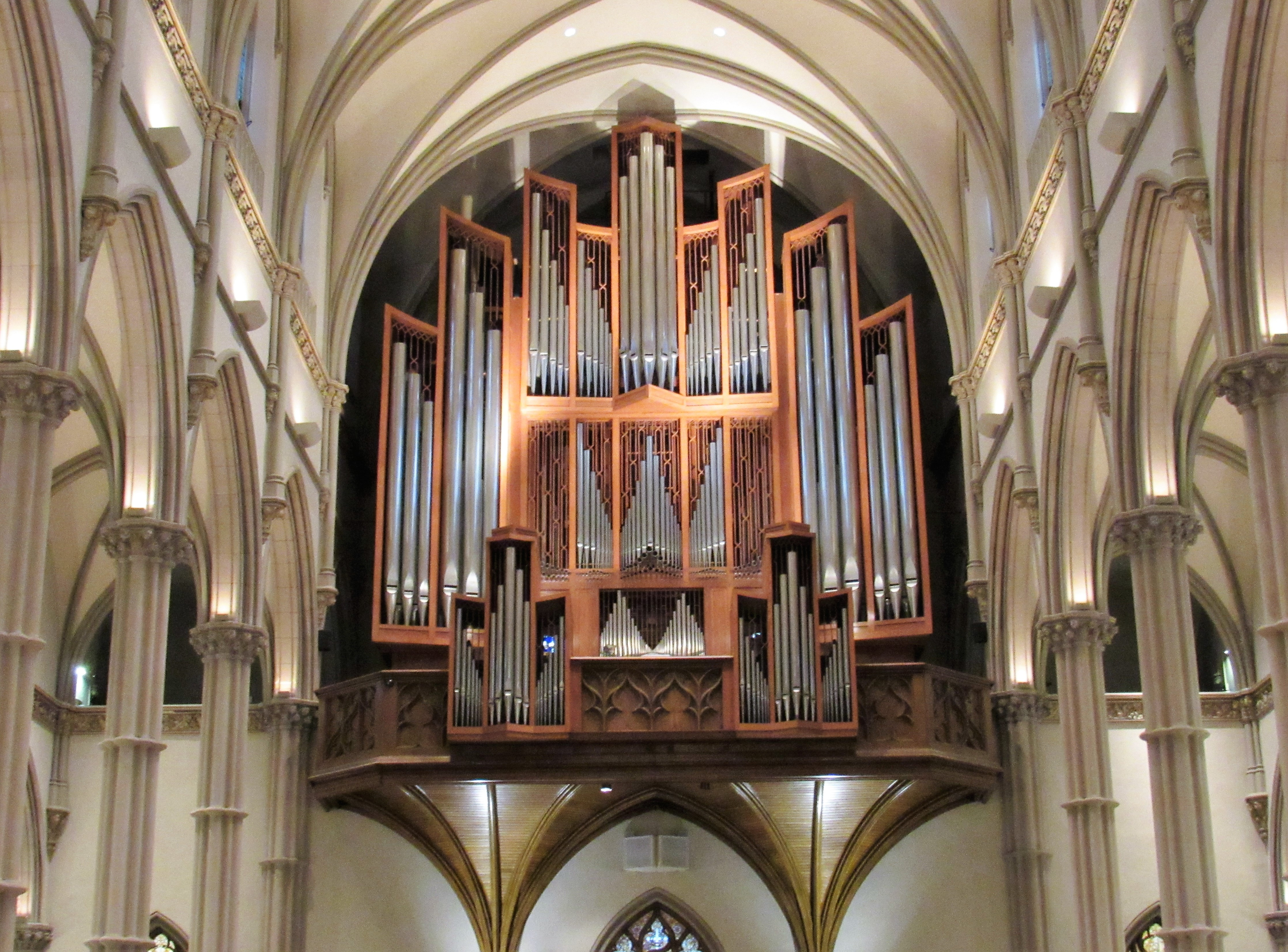
Von Beckerath pipe organ (2017)

The industrialist Andrew Carnegie provided the cathedral's first pipe organ, built in 1895 by W. W. Kimball, of Jasper, Indiana. During the 1950s, the cathedral contracted with Aeolian-Skinner of Boston, Massachusetts, to build a new large four-manual organ. After the deal with Aeolian-Skinner, fell through, the cathedral selected Rudolf von Beckerath of Munich, Germany, to manufacture the pipe organ.

Named "one of the monument organs of the continent", the von Beckerath pipe organ was completed in 1962; it has undergone several major refurbishment projects since its installation.

== Our Lady of Craig Street ==
Out Lady of Craig Street Statue

On the east side of Saint Paul Cathedral is a grotto (also known as the "cove on Craig"). The grotto features a statue known as "Our Lady of Craig Street" which depicts the Mary, mother of Jesus. In front of the statue lies a stone with an inscription that reads: "THIS STATUE, AFFECTIONATELY KNOWN AS "OUR LADY OF CRAIG STREET" STOOD HIGH ON THE FACADE ON THE CATHEDRAL CONVENT FROM 1927 UNTIL 2003. THE BRICKS USED TO FORM THIS GROTTO ARE FROM THE ORIGINAL CONVENT BUILDING . WE DEDICATE THIS GROTTO WITH GRATITUDE FOR THE FAITHFUL SERVICE OF ALL THE SISTERS OF MERCY WHO SERVED ST. PAUL CATHEDRAL FOR OVER 75 YEARS JANUARY 1, 2004"

== Gallery ==
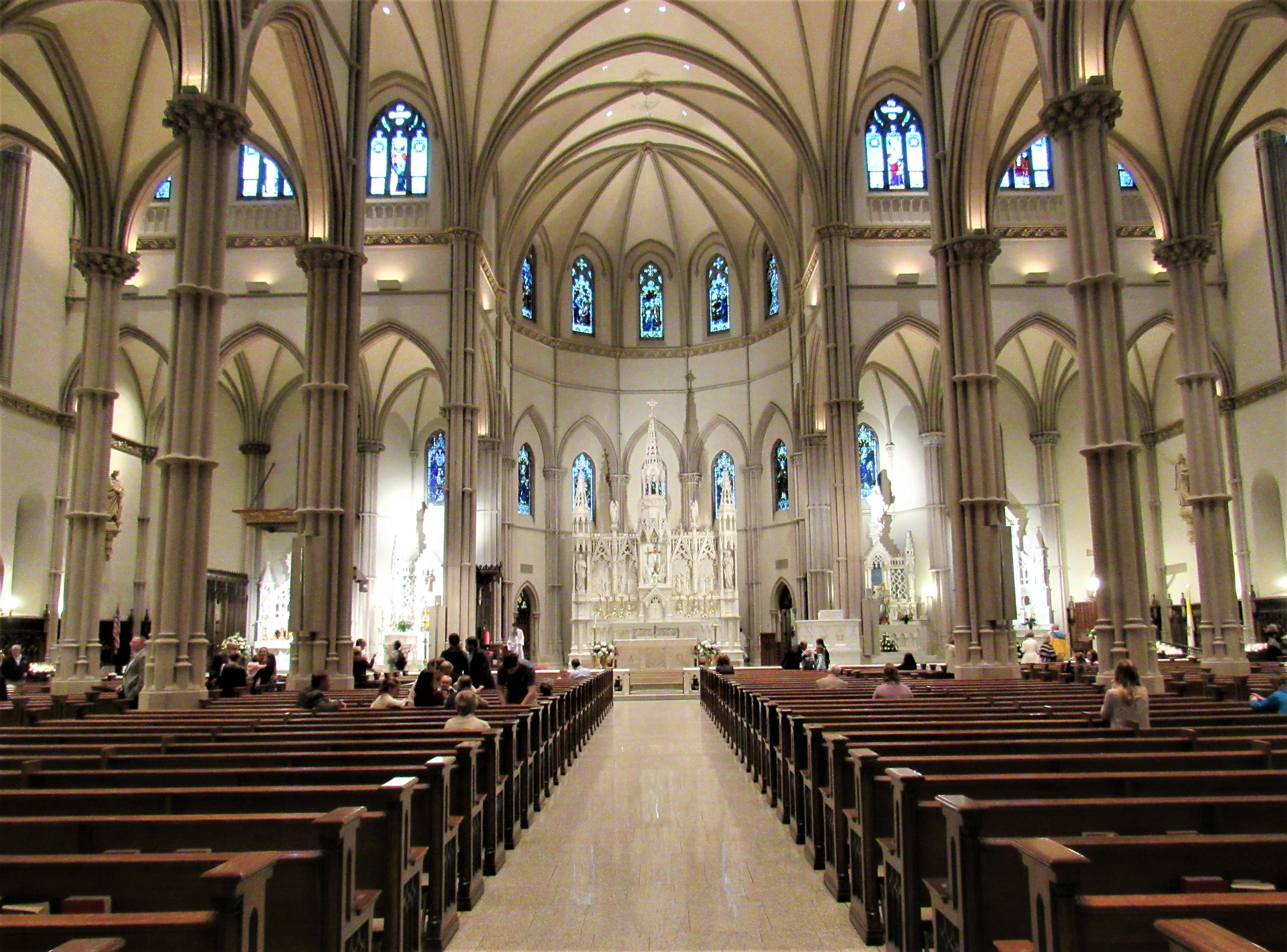
Cathedral interior (2017)

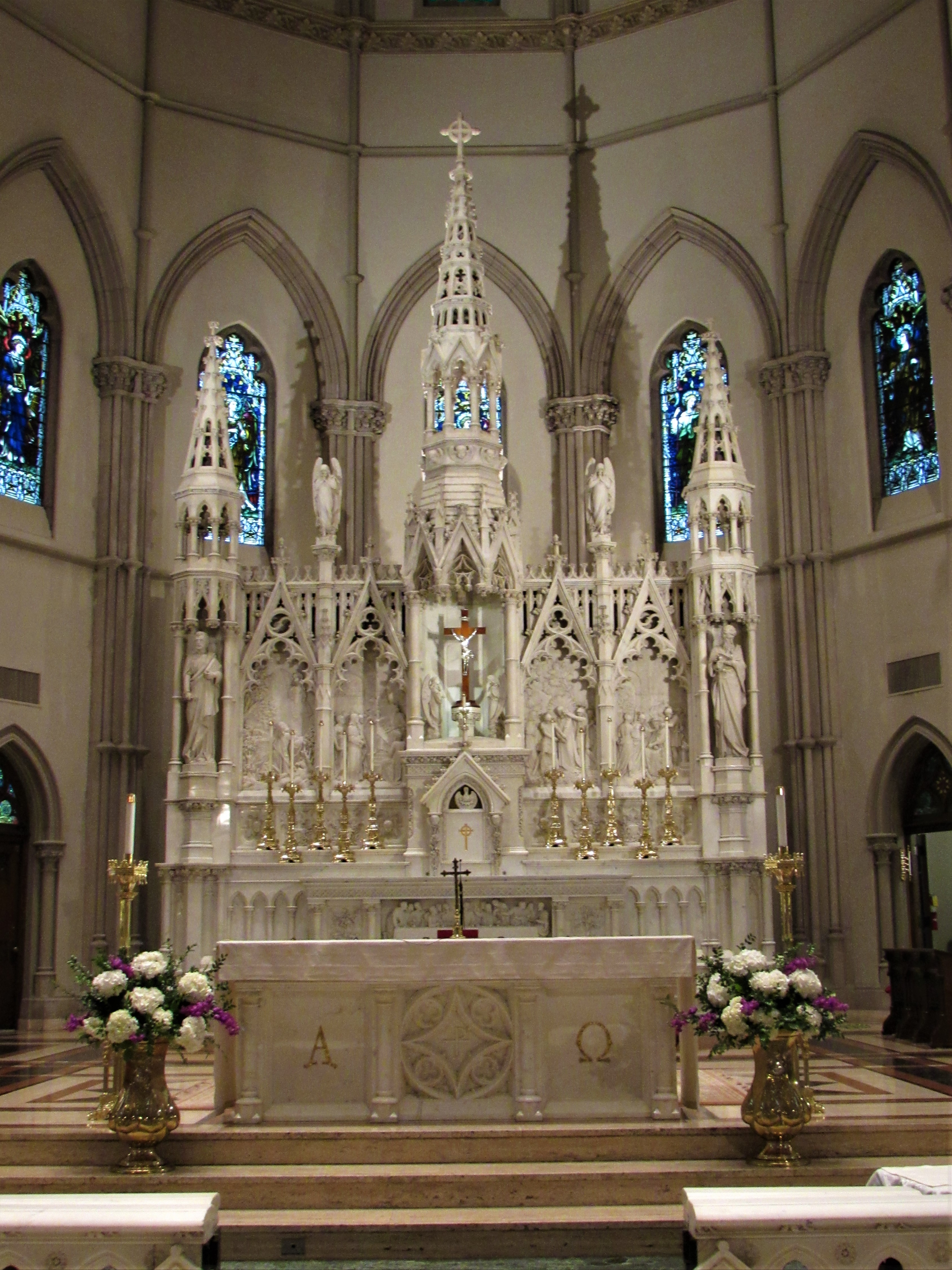
Altar and reredos (2017)

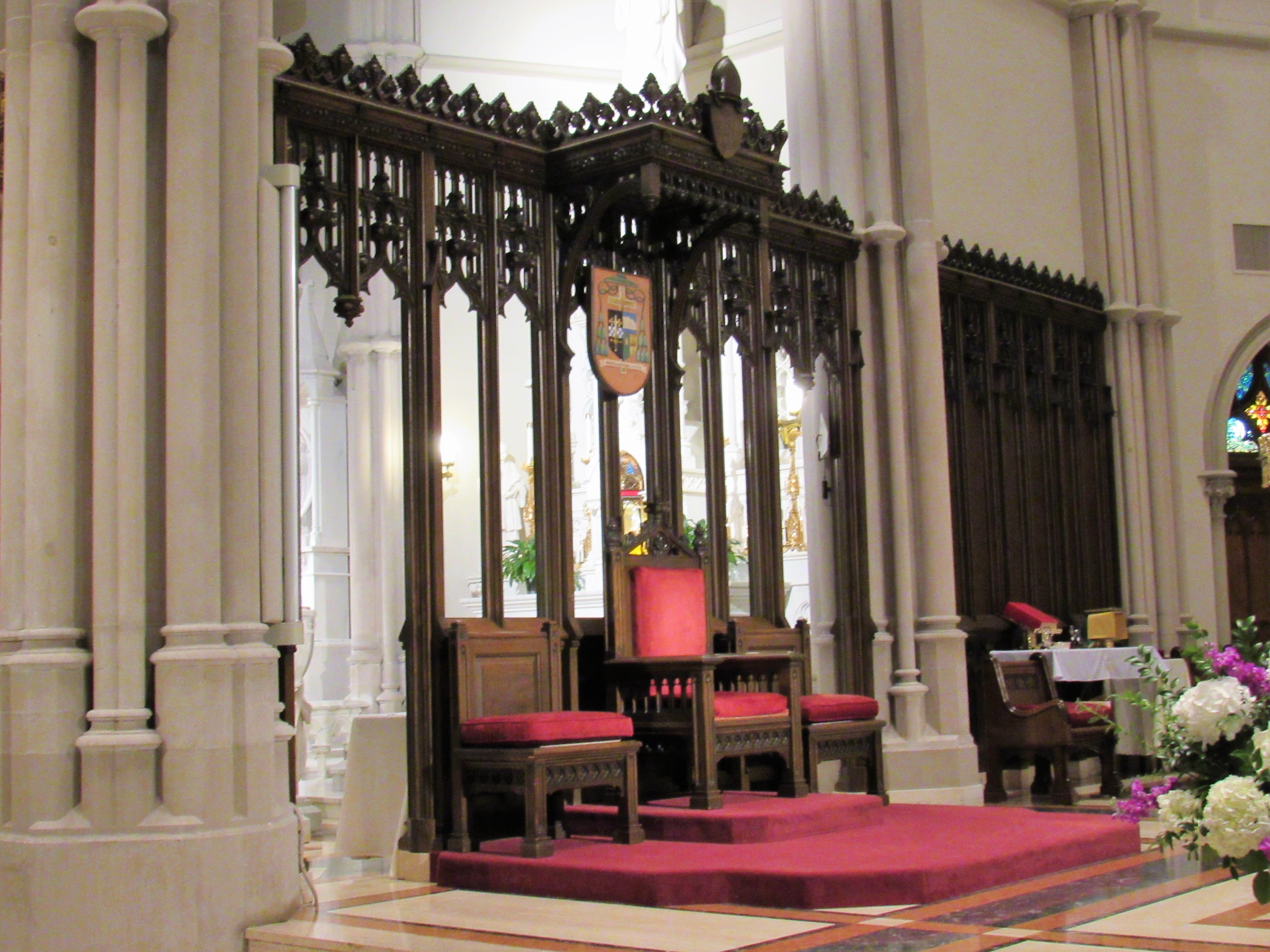
Cathedra (2017)

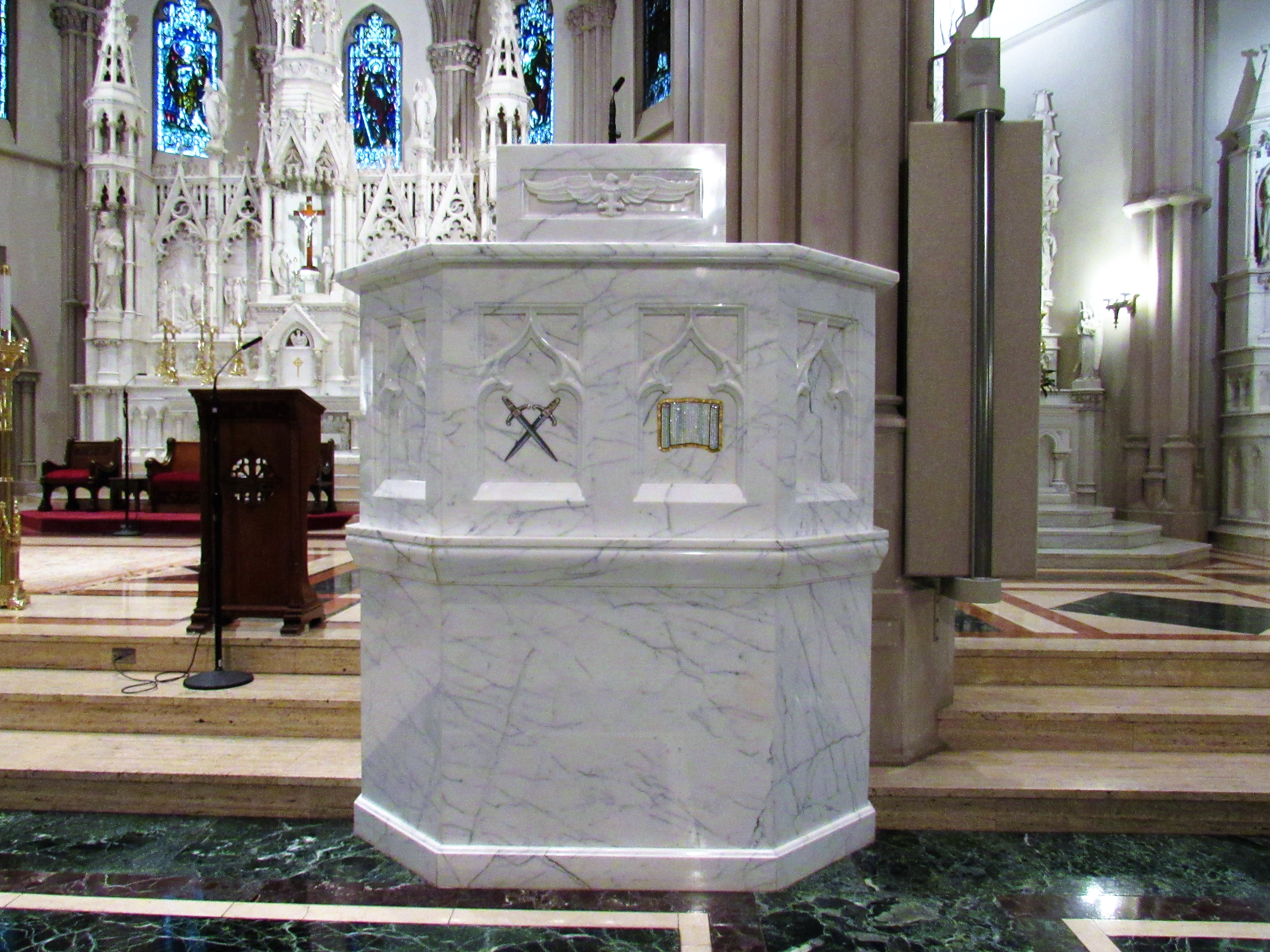
Ambo (2017)

== See also ==
- List of Catholic cathedrals in the United States
- List of cathedrals in the United States
