= Egan & Prindeville =

Architectural firm based in Chicago

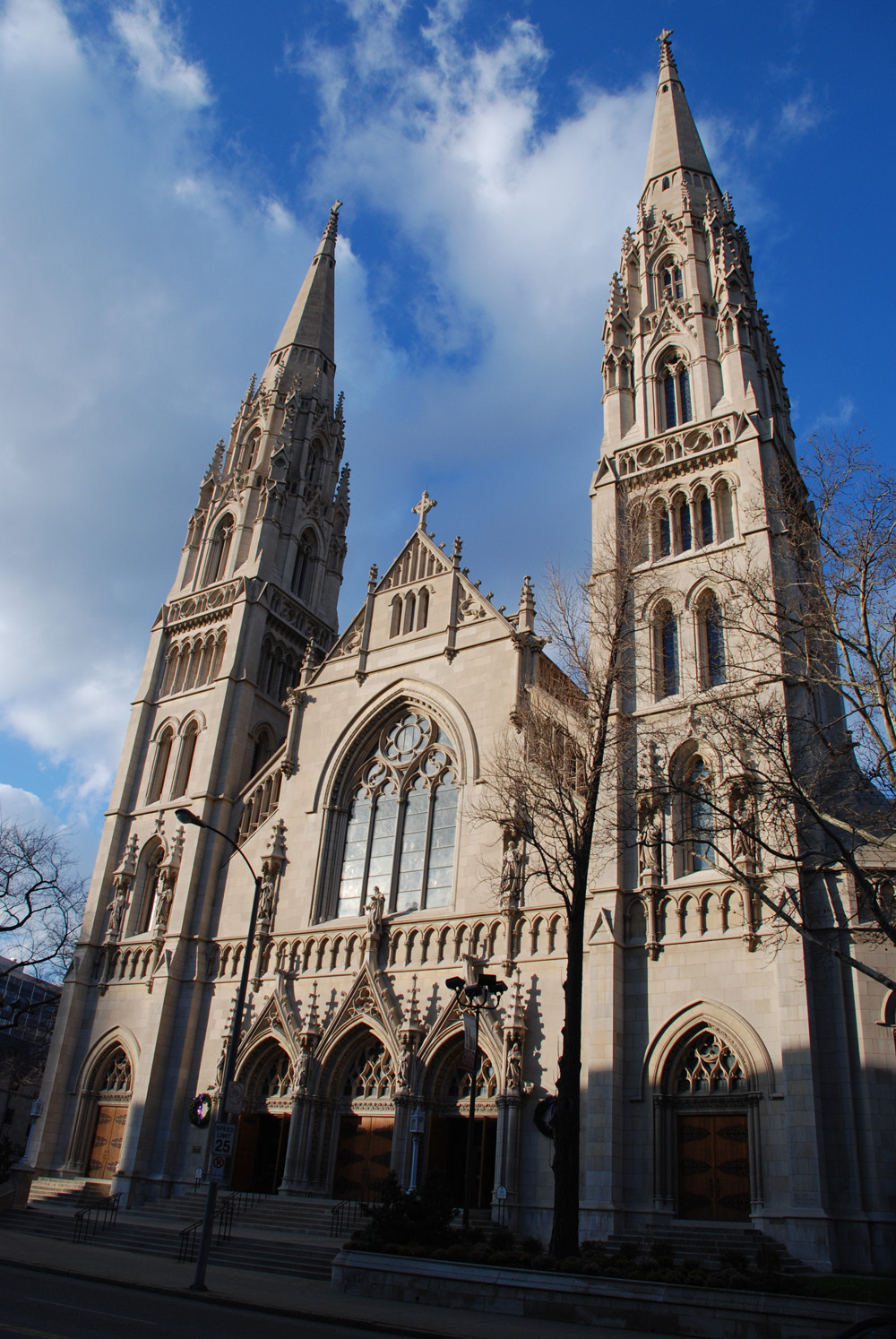
Cathedral of St. Paul (Pittsburgh, Pennsylvania), 1906

Egan & Prindeville was an architectural firm active in Chicago, Illinois from 1897 to 1914 which gained prominence designing Roman Catholic structures, including the Cathedral of St. Paul (1906) at Pittsburgh, Pennsylvania. The firm was founded by James J. Egan, FAIA, (1839—1914) and Charles Prindeville (1868 —1947).

== Partners ==
James J. Egan was born in Cork, Ireland in 1839. Egan came to Chicago around the time of the Great Chicago Fire and became involved in the reconstruction. Egan was a partner in Armstrong & Egan and Egan & Kirkland before he entered into partnership with Prindeville. The firm continued after Egan's death in 1914 under Charles Prindeville.

Charles Henry Prindeville was born in Chicago in 1868. In 1914, he was president of the Illinois Chapter of the American Institute of Architects. Prindeville died June 16, 1947.

== Notable works ==
- St. Mary of the Assumption Cathedral in San Francisco, California (built in 1891, destroyed by fire in 1962).
- Holy Guardian Angel Church, Chicago (1899)
- St. Francis de Sales Church, Keokuk, Iowa (1899)
- Cathedral of St. Paul in Pittsburgh, Pennsylvania (built in 1906).
- Our Lady of Mount Carmel, (Lakeview) Chicago (1913)
- Mercy Hospital, Chicago (new wings)
- St. Xavier Academy
- Visitation Catholic school
- St. Jerome Roman Catholic Church, (Rogers Park) Chicago (1916)
- Sacred Heart, Rochester, New York (1925)
