= Patrick Chovanec =

American economist

- Born: Patrick Robert Chovanec; February 14, 1970 (age 56); LaGrange, Illinois, U.S.
- Education: Princeton University (AB); The Wharton School (MBA)
- Occupation: Economist
- Political party: Former Republican
- Spouse: Frances Chovanec

Patrick Robert Chovanec (born February 14, 1970) is an American writer and economic advisor at Silvercrest Asset Management, where he was formerly chief strategist. He has taught as a professor at Tsinghua University's School of Business and Management in Beijing, China and as an adjunct professor at the School of International and Public Affairs, Columbia University, and is a frequent commentator on the Chinese and global economies. A former political aide to senior Republican Party leaders in the U.S., and a political conservative, he left the party and became an independent as part of the Never Trump movement. In 2023, he authored Cleared for the Option: A Year Learning to Fly, a book about the process of becoming an airplane pilot.

== Biography ==
=== Early life and education ===
Patrick Chovanec was born on February 14, 1970, in LaGrange, Illinois, and was raised in nearby Western Springs, Illinois, in the western suburbs of Chicago. He attended high school at St. Ignatius College Prep, in Chicago, and upon graduating in 1988 was recognized as a Presidential Scholar. He graduated with an A.B. in economics from Princeton University in 1993 after completing a senior thesis, titled "Modelling the Informal Economy: The Case of Mexico City", under the supervision of Christina Paxson. He then received an M.B.A. in Finance and Accounting (2005) from The Wharton School at the University of Pennsylvania, where he graduated as a Palmer Scholar in the top 5% of his class. After receiving an ROTC scholarship at Princeton, he served nine years as a transportation and logistics officer in the United States Army Reserve.

=== Career ===
Upon graduating college, Chovanec worked as an aide to William Kristol at Project for the Republican Future. The Project's fax memos to Republican leaders were widely credited with orchestrating the political defeat of the Clinton health care plan in 1993. After the so-called Republican Revolution of 1994, when the Republican Party gained majority control of Congress, Chovanec worked for John Boehner, then chairman of the House Republican Conference. As the editor of Legislative Digest, Chovanec played a central role in coordinating the Contract with America.

In 2000, Chovanec was hired by Institutional Investor to serve as director of their Asia-Pacific Institute, based in Hong Kong, a private forum for senior heads of financial institutions. He later ran a similar forum, the Global Fixed Income Institute, based in London, for senior European bond investors. After earning his MBA, Chovanec returned to Asia to work as a private equity investor for a series of funds focused mainly on China.

From 2008 to 2013, Chovanec taught as an associate professor of Practice at Tsinghua University's School of Economics and Management, located in Beijing, China, in the school's English-language International MBA program. He taught courses on US-China business relations, the market and regulatory environment for foreign companies in the U.S., and American business history. Outside the classroom, Chovanec served as a private advisor to several Fortune 500 corporations, hedge funds, private equity funds, and foreign governments regarding China. He also chaired the Public Policy Development Committee for the American Chamber of Commerce in China (Amcham China), where he helped coordinate annual publication of the American business community's public policy White Paper on China, as well as its annual Business Climate Survey. His blog was named by the Wall Street Journal as one of "The Best Economics Blogs" for 2010.

In March 2013, Chovanec joined Silvercrest Asset Management Group as managing director and chief strategist. Silvercrest Asset Management oversees $18.6 billion in investments. From 2014 to 2020, he taught courses in U.S.-China negotiations as an adjunct professor at the School of International and Public Affairs, Columbia University. In 2014, Business Insider named him one of "The 102 Finance People You Have To Follow On Twitter". He was also a senior fellow with the Goldwater Institute, a conservative public policy think tank based in Arizona and served on the Dean's International Council for the University of Chicago's Harris School of Public Policy Studies. Chovanec is a Certified Public Accountant (CPA) registered in the State of Illinois.

Through 2016, Chovanec was an advisor to several Republican presidential candidates on China and economics. In March 2016, he was among 122 "GOP National Security Leaders" who signed an open letter declaring their opposition to the candidacy of Donald Trump. After Trump won and became president in 2017, the signers of this letter were reportedly blackballed by the Administration and largely ostracized within Republican circles.

== Writings and commentary ==
=== China's real estate market ===
Chovanec was among the early commentators to highlight the threat of a bubble forming in China's real estate market after the 2008 financial crisis. In an article in the June 2009 issue of Far Eastern Economic Review, he introduced the idea that Chinese savers have been stockpiling multiple residential units, and willingly leaving them vacant, as a "store of value," like gold. In late 2011, in Foreign Affairs magazine, Chovanec called attention to the downturn in China property prices and transaction volumes, suggesting that the "bubble" may have popped. He has since argued that lifting the central government's restrictions on multiple home purchases, along with a renewed push to construct subsidized public housing, would not—as is commonly hoped—be sufficient to turn the market around in the face of what Chovanec sees as a more fundamental correction.

=== China's post-crisis economic stimulus ===
Chovanec criticized China's stimulus package in response to the 2008 financial crisis, although he admits that China's leaders may have felt they had little alternative at the onset of the crisis. He has stated that the challenge China faces is not quantity of GDP, but quality of GDP (economic investments that would position China for sustainable future growth), and has questioned the economic utility of many of the state-led projects designed to boost China's near-term GDP to achieve the government's target of 8%. Beginning in May 2009, he wrote that the ongoing lending boom by Chinese state-run banks could burden them with sizeable bad debt, as well as reverse a decade's worth of reforms intended to transform those banks into genuine commercial entities. He also contends that the lending boom, by expanding China's money supply more than 50% over the past two years, has created massive inflationary pressure in the Chinese economy, despite low reported increases in CPI. In October 2010, Chovanec wrote that China's leaders need to stage an encore of Deng Xiaoping's 1992 Southern Tour, in order to recommit the country to the path of market reform, after a similar period of retrenchment.

=== China's currency and exchange rate regime ===
Chovanec argues that it is in China's own interests to move towards a more flexible exchange rate and a stronger Renminbi. Such a move, he believes, would reduce inflationary pressures on China's economy and enhance the buying power, and hence the living standards, of average Chinese citizens, as well as reducing tensions with China's trading partners. However, he sharply disagrees with Paul Krugman, and argues that an exclusive focus on rectifying exchange rates as a "silver bullet" is misplaced. Forcing China to strengthen its currency against its will, he contends, would only cause China to shore up its export sector through other means, and would likely result in a replay of the 1985 Plaza Accord (in which the value of the Japanese yen doubled, yet had virtually no impact on the US-Japan trade imbalance due to structural reasons). Exchange rate reform, Chovanec believes, will only have the desired impact if it is part of a broader economic strategy in which China embraces greater market reform and opening.

=== The Nine Nations of China ===
In November 2009, Chovanec authored an interactive map-based article in the online version of The Atlantic, titled "The Nine Nations of China", in which he wrote the China can be considered not as a monolithic entity of 1.3 billion people, but as a mosaic of nine distinct regions.

=== North Korea ===
Chovanec is one of just over a thousand U.S. citizens to have been permitted to visit North Korea. His first visit, in October 2008, took him to Pyongyang and the northern side of the Korean Demilitarized Zone. His second trip, in July 2010, took him to the Rajin-Sonbong Economic Special Zone, in the country's extreme northeast, and across the Khasan railroad border crossing with Russia.
