= Writers on business in China =

Writers on business include academics such as Li Yining, Disequilibrium in the Chinese Economy (1990), as well as businessman Ni Runfeng.

Since the reform and opening up of China, the first generation of Western businessmen in China have written accounts of their experiences:

- Tim Clissold Mr. China: A Memoir 2006 2nd.Ed. 2010, on running Jack Perkowski's Asimco.
- Jack Perkowski Managing the Dragon: How I’m Building a Billion Dollar Business in China 2008

Other accounts have been written by journalists:

- Jim Mann Beijing Jeep 1997, former Los Angeles Times Beijing Bureau chief describes the early Beijing Jeep JV.
- James L. McGregor One Billion Customers 2005 by former Wall Street Journal China bureau chief.

A related category is business fiction such as the novel of John D. Kuhns China Fortunes: A Tale of Business in the New World 2010
