= Tim Clissold =

- Education: Yarm Grammar School; Jesus College, Cambridge (1982, Physics and Theoretical Physics)

Tim Clissold (Chinese name: 祈立天) is a Western writer on business in China. He is the author of a memoir detailing how he helped the Wall Street trader Jack Perkowski to invest, lose and recover over $400 million in mainland China as the country first opened up to foreign direct investment. His book detailed the numerous ways the fund lost money and the steps it took to recover it. Clissold was president of the foreign-invested ASIMCO Technologies before parting company from Perkowski, who claims never to have read the book that gave him the nickname Mr. China. Time Magazine described Mr China as 'an instant classic.'

Clissold has since written three more books, Chinese Rules, Cloud Chamber and Teach the People. The Financial Times Shanghai correspondent wrote of Chinese Rules: 'Read Tim Clissold, the British businessman whose book Mr China is probably the best I've ever come across about China. Now he has written another: it's about what makes China tick - for foreigners who can clearly hear it ticking but can't quite figure out why.'

Clissold is a Visiting Fellow at Jesus College, Cambridge and Senior Research Associate at the Cambridge University China Forum. For many years, he has undertaken dispute resolution assignments in China to mediate between Chinese businesses and foreign investors in cases where the relationship has broken down. He is non-executive director of London Stock Exchange quoted investment trusts, Henderson Far East Income and Baillie Gifford China Growth. In March, 2025, he joined Highgate Limited, a dispute resolution advisory firm as Senior Advisor.

== Bibliography ==
- Mr. China: A Memoir, HarperBusiness, 2005
- Chinese Rules, HarperCollins, 2014
- Cloud Chamber, Commercial Press of China, 2021
- Teach the People, to be published in early 2025.
