= South of the Clouds =

South of the Clouds may refer to:

- South of the Clouds (1950 film), a documentary by William James
- South of the Clouds (2004 film) or 云的南方, a Chinese film by Zhu Wen
- South of the Clouds (2014 film) or 北回归线, a Chinese film by Guo Shuang and Feng Yuan
- South of the Clouds (novel), a 2018 novel by John D. Kuhns

== See also ==
- Yunnan, literally "South of the Clouds", a Chinese province
