= James L. McGregor =

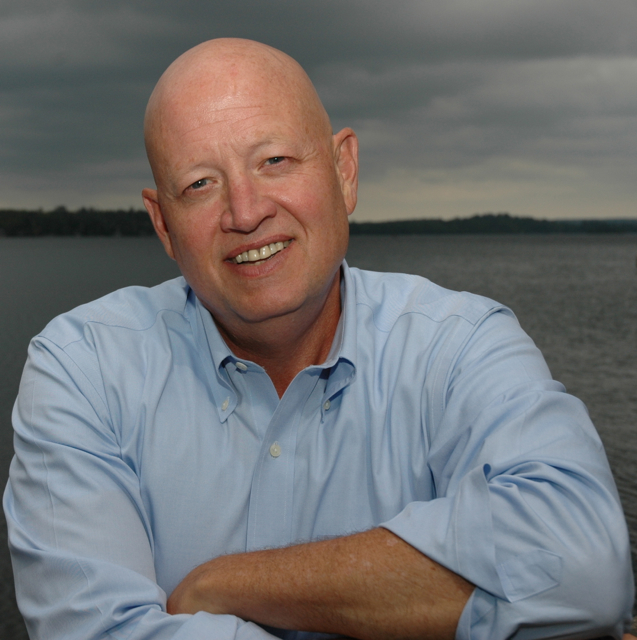
- In Duluth, Minnesota in 2012
- Born: September 18, 1953 (age 72); Duluth, Minnesota
- Occupations: Author; CEO, Dow Jones & Company China; China Bureau Chief, Wall Street Journal; Taiwan Bureau Chief, Wall Street Journal
- Website: https://jamesmcgregor-inc.com

James L. McGregor is an American author, journalist and businessman who has lived in China for more than 25 years. He is one of the most recognized analysts and writers on business in China.

McGregor is chairman of APCO Worldwide, Greater China and a member of the firm’s international advisory council. A professional speaker who specializes in China's business, politics and society, he regularly appears in the media to discuss China-related topics.

He is the author of the books No Ancient Wisdom, No Followers: The Challenges of Chinese Authoritarian Capitalism (Prospecta Press, 2012) and One Billion Customers: Lessons from the Front Lines of Doing Business in China (Simon & Schuster, 2005). He also covered China's indigenous innovation policies in the report "China's Drive for Indigenous Innovation: A Web of Industrial Policies" in 2010.

He is the former CEO of Dow Jones & Company in China and Wall Street Journal bureau chief in China and Taiwan.

== Early life ==
James McGregor was born September 18, 1953, in Duluth, Minnesota. He is one of nine children. After he graduated from high school in 1971, McGregor enlisted as a foot-soldier in the US Army. He was promptly sent to Vietnam where he was wounded by a North Vietnamese IED while on combat patrol and was awarded a Bronze Star and The Purple Heart. According to reports of the incident, the booby-trap was actually triggered by a bomb-detecting dog who apparently was more agile than McGregor and survived the detonation unharmed. His experience in Vietnam sparked his interest in Asia and led to him becoming a journalist.

== Career ==
After returning from Vietnam, McGregor graduated from the University of Minnesota with a degree in journalism, and began his career as a police reporter in Los Angeles for Copley Newspapers. In 1985, while he was covering Capitol Hill for Knight Ridder Newspapers, he took a 6-week backpacking trip through China to explore whether to focus his journalism career on China. Following his trip, he began taking Mandarin lessons. He then convinced his wife Catherine Grady McGregor that Taiwan was very similar to Hawaii and they sold most of their possessions and moved to Taipei with two suitcases each in 1987. Their relationship survived McGregor's Taiwan "Hawaiian analogy" by virtue of his proven record of maintaining a cool head under fire and his steadfast repetition that all he really was trying to say is they were both places that were indeed islands surrounded by ocean.

From 1987 to 1990 McGregor served as The Wall Street Journal's bureau chief in Taiwan, and from 1990 to 1994 as the paper’s bureau chief in Mainland China. From 1994 to 2000, McGregor was chief executive of Dow Jones & Company in China, and he also became a vice-president in the Dow Jones International Group. After leaving Dow Jones, McGregor was China managing partner for GIV Venture Partners, a $140 million venture capital fund specializing in the Chinese Internet and technology outsourcing.

In 1996, McGregor was elected as chairman of the American Chamber of Commerce in China. He also served for a decade as a governor of that organization.

In 2005, McGregor published the book One Billion Customers: Lessons from the Front Lines of Doing Business in China. The book has been published in seven languages. McGregor is a member of the Atlantic Council; Council on Foreign Relations; National Committee on US-China Relations; Global Council of the Asia Society; and serves on a variety of China-related advisory boards, including the US-China Education Trust.

He splits his time between Shanghai and Beijing.
