= Presidential Scholars Program =

American educational honor

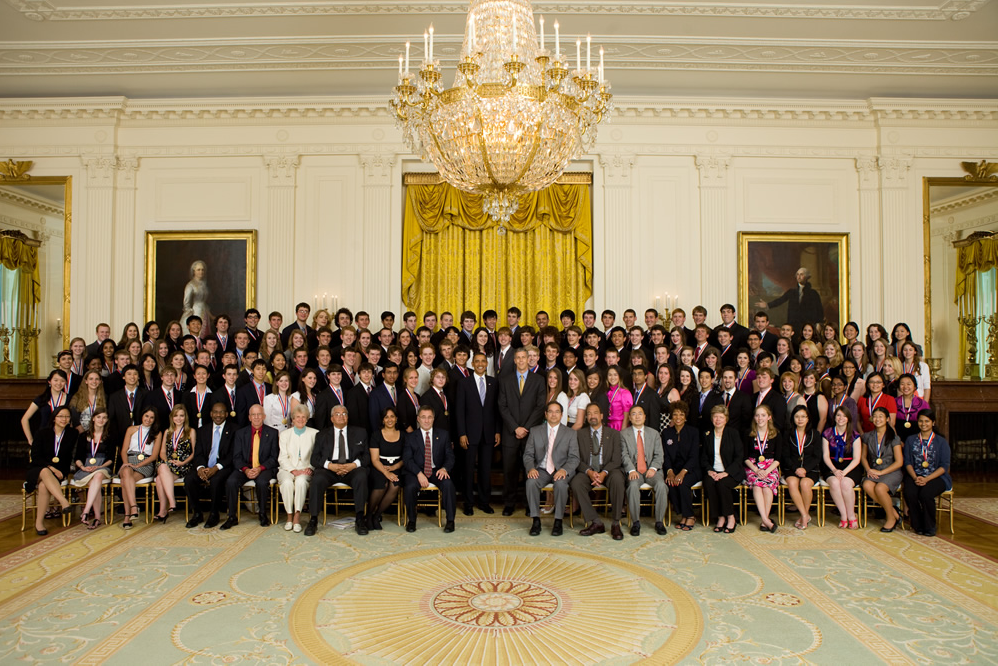
2010 Presidential Scholars with President Barack Obama

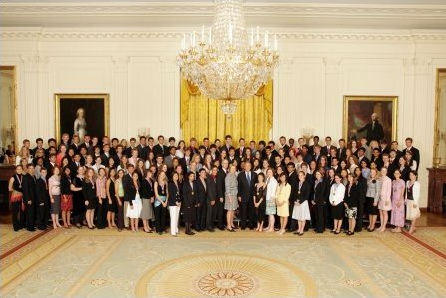
2005 Presidential Scholars with President George W. Bush

The United States Presidential Scholars Program is a program of the United States Department of Education. It is described as "one of the nation's highest honors for high school students" in the United States of America.

The program was established in 1964 by executive order of President Lyndon B. Johnson to recognize the nation's most distinguished graduating high school seniors. Its scope has expanded twice: in 1979, to recognize students who demonstrate exceptional talent in the arts, and in 2015, to recognize students who demonstrate ability and accomplishment in career and technical fields.

Application for the U.S. Presidential Scholars Program is by invitation only. The White House Commission on Presidential Scholars makes the final selection of up to 161 U.S. Presidential Scholars from among that year's senior class.

== Eligibility and selection process ==
Eligibility is set by the U.S. Department of Education. Students cannot apply to the program, and are nominated through screening criteria that vary depending on the type of scholarship for which they are eligible.

Nominees	Approximate number per year
Eligible students in the U.S., District of Columbia, Puerto Rico, and citizens living abroad	3600
Semifinalists	620
Presidential Scholars	161 including 20 Arts and 20 Career and Technical

=== General ===
All graduating high school seniors who are U.S. citizens or legal permanent residents and who have scored exceptionally well on either the SAT of the College Board or the ACT Assessment of the American College Testing Program on or before October of each year are automatically considered for participation.

The United States Department of Education then examines the test records for the scoring students, ranks them separately for males and females, and selects the top 20 males and top 20 females in each state. Each Chief State School Officer (CSSO) may nominate up to ten male and ten female candidates, residing in the CSSO's jurisdiction, based on their outstanding scholarship.

Candidates are notified of eligibility, and if interested in being considered for the scholarship, must submit an essay, self-assessments, high school reports, and transcripts. They are evaluated on their academic achievement, personal characteristics, leadership and service activities, and an analysis of their essay. Approximately 600 students are chosen as semifinalists. In July, the White House Commission on Presidential Scholars makes the final selection of up to 161 Presidential Scholars.

=== Arts ===
To be eligible, students must have registered with and been active participants in the YoungArts program. 150 students are invited to apply by the National Foundation for the Advancement of Artists. 60 YoungArts candidates enter the selection process at the semifinalist level. In April, the Commission on Presidential Scholars makes the final selection of up to 20 Presidential Scholars in the Arts.

=== Career and Technical ===
Nominations are submitted by each state's Chief State School Officer (CSSO). CSSOs can nominate up to five candidates who meet the requirements. In March, up to 60 candidates enter the U.S. Presidential Scholars Program selection process at the semifinalist level. In April, the White House Commission on Presidential Scholars makes the final selection of up to 20 U.S. Presidential Scholars in Career and Technical Education.

== Notable participants ==
=== Government ===
- Merrick Garland (1970, Illinois) – Former U.S. Attorney General
- Jamie Raskin (1979, District of Columbia) – U.S. Representative and Ranking Member, House Judiciary Committee
- Mitch Daniels (1967, Indiana) – Former Governor of Indiana
- Don Beyer (1968, District of Columbia) – U.S. Representative & Senior House Democrat, Joint Economic Committee
- Saritha Komatireddy (2001, Missouri) – Assistant U.S. Attorney, and chief of staff of the Drug Enforcement Administration; Republican nominee for attorney general of New York in the 2026 election.
- Michelle Wu (2003, Illinois) – Mayor of Boston

=== Academic ===
- Richard Alley (1976, Ohio) – geosciences professor at Pennsylvania State University
- Charles B. Chang (1999, New York) – linguistics professor at City University of Hong Kong
- Patrick Chovanec (1988, Illinois) – business professor at Tsinghua University, former aide to Speaker of the House John Boehner
- Elizabeth Kiss (1979, Virginia) – eighth president of Agnes Scott College, first female Warden of Rhodes House, Oxford University and CEO of the Rhodes Trust
- Kermit Roosevelt III (1989, District of Columbia) – author, law professor at University of Pennsylvania

=== Arts ===
- Suzette Charles (1981, New Jersey) – Miss America 1984, singer and entertainer
- Claire Chase (1996, California) – flutist, composer, professor of music Harvard University, and winner of a MacArthur Fellowship
- Lindsay Crouse (2002, Rhode Island) - Journalist, Author, and Emmy, Peabody, and Academy Award winning Film Producer
- Rita Dove (1970, Ohio) – Poet Laureate of the United States, winner of Pulitzer Prize for Poetry
- Ryan McCartan (2011, Minnesota) – actor and musician
- America Ferrera (2003, California) – actress and director
- Ben Levi Ross (2016, California) – stage actor
- Desmond Richardson (1986) – dancer, co-founder of Complexions Contemporary Ballet
- Josh Singer (1990, Pennsylvania) – screenwriter
- Conrad Tao (2011, New York) – pianist, composer and violinist
- Dominique Thorne (2015, New York) – actress
