= China Fortunes =

2011 novel by John D. Kuhns

- First edition
- Author: John D. Kuhns
- Language: English
- Publisher: Wiley
- Publication date: 2011
- ISBN: 978-0-470-92804-2 (first edition, hardcover)
- Dewey Decimal: 338.88851
- LC Class: HD2910 .K845

China Fortunes is a 2011 novel by John D. Kuhns. The book is loosely based on his career and experiences in the United States and China. The protagonist followed throughout the book, Jack Davis, is an American financier who begins traveling to China in the 1980s. As Jack conducts business and chases wealth, he encounters the opportunities, as well as the obstacles, available to the few foreigners willing to brave the uncertainties of the PRC at the time. Tracing the beginnings of China’s industrial age and nascent capitalism, the book also takes the reader through Wall Street’s trading floors, IPOs, and multi-national hydroelectric deals.

== Background information ==
China Fortunes was published in the United States and Canada by John Wiley & Sons, Inc. on December 9, 2010 (ISBN 9781118005644).

John D. Kuhns is an author, artist, businessman and investment banker, known for renewable and alternative energy investments around the world.

== Reception ==
The book received positive reviews with Terry McDonell, Managing Editor of Sports Illustrated, calling it "a smart and stylish take on what business really is in modern China. Kuhns knows both cold, and most important, he can tell a great story…ironic, fast moving and sharply observed. It will lock you in."

Robert Hsu, editor of China Strategy says, "A novel by a veteran American investment banker with years of experience wheeling and dealing in China, the book is loosely based on the author's personal story. It is a highly entertaining yet informative book for anyone interested in how fortunes can be made or lost almost overnight in the world's fastest growing economy. This was just published this year, and I couldn't put the book down after I started reading it."

Marc Levy, author of The Shadow Thief says, "China Fortunes is an extraordinary story conducted by a talented storyteller. Kuhns's pen drives you in a world unknown to most of us, taking you through fascinating and moving situations, and like every great journey, you won't come back exactly the same."
