= North Catholic High School =

Location
- 1617 Route 228; Cranberry Township, Butler County, Pennsylvania 16066; United States; 40°41′17″N 80°4′6″W

Information
- Former name: Cardinal Wuerl North Catholic High School
- Type: Private
- Motto: Latin: Fortes in fide (Strong in faith)
- Religious affiliation: Catholic
- Established: 1939
- Founder: Hugh Charles Boyle
- Status: Open
- Oversight: board of directors
- CEEB code: 393750
- Chair: Nick Navari
- Principal: Zeb Jansante
- Chaplain: David Schmidt; Daniel Roberts
- Teaching staff: 51.4 (on an FTE basis)
- Grades: 9–12
- Gender: coeducational
- Enrolment: 681 (2023–2024)
- Student to teacher ratio: 13.2
- Colors: Scarlet and gold
- Slogan: Fortes in Fide
- Song: Forever True
- Team name: Trojans
- Accreditation: MSA
- School fees: $225 graduation fee
- Annual tuition: $14,650 Catholic students $15,650 Non-Catholic students $16,875 International students
- Website: www.northcatholic.org

North Catholic High School is a private Catholic high school located in Cranberry Township, Butler County, Pennsylvania. The school's mascot is the Trojan, and its colors are scarlet and gold.

== History ==
North Catholic High School began as an all-boys school in 1939, founded by Bishop Hugh Charles Boyle of the Diocese of Pittsburgh and the Marianists. Girls began enrolling in the school in 1973. The original location of the high school was in the Pittsburgh neighborhood of Troy Hill, where it operated for 75 years.

On June 2, 2012, the Diocese of Pittsburgh held a groundbreaking ceremony in Cranberry Township to mark the start of construction of Cardinal Wuerl North Catholic High School, slated to begin admitting students in the fall of 2014. The school was renamed Cardinal Wuerl North Catholic High School for the 2013–2014 school year after Cardinal Donald Wuerl.

On September 10, 2018, Dayton Daily News revealed that school officials shielded some North Catholic faculty accused of sex abuse through transfers to Marian schools in Dayton, Ohio.

=== Name change ===
In 2018, the name of the school reverted to North Catholic High School following criticism of Cardinal Donald Wuerl by a grand jury investigation into child abuse in Pennsylvania. There had been calls to remove the Wuerl's name since the grand jury report was released and the words "Cardinal Wuerl" on the sign outside of the school were spraypainted over by unknown vandals. The school removed the name at Wuerl's request.

== Extracurricular activities ==
In 2015, students pushed to create a FIRST Robotics team. The team was nicknamed the Trojanators, a spin-off of the school mascot, the Trojan. The team has won numerous awards, and several students have been named Dean's List Finalists. The team is a respected organization in the Western Pennsylvania Robotics scene.

In 2016, the school revitalized its marching band after a 10-year absence. The marching band performs halftime shows at both away and home football games and participates in parades.

In 2021, North Catholic's football team reached the 3A WPIAL Championship, ultimately losing to Central Valley.

== Notable alumni ==
- Michael Hayden — former Director of the National Security Agency, Principal Deputy Director of National Intelligence, and Director of the Central Intelligence Agency
- Jack Perkowski — first major Wall Street investor in mainland China
- Daniel M. Rooney — owner and chairman of NFL's Pittsburgh Steelers
- Dan Onorato — Chief Executive, Allegheny County (2003–2012)
- Kevin Colbert — Director of Football Operations (GM), Pittsburgh Steelers (2000–2021)
- Luke Ravenstahl ('98) — former Mayor of Pittsburgh
- Bill Yoest — All-American football player
- John Stehr ('76) Hall of Fame Broadcaster & Current Mayor of Zionsville, Indiana
