= Democratic Study Group =

Former U.S. House Democrats' liberal caucus

The Democratic Study Group (DSG) was a caucus consisting of liberal members of the Democratic Party in the United States House of Representatives, which also operated as a legislative service organization (LSO). It was founded in 1959 and was active until roughly 1994. It was founded "as a liberal counterpoint to the influence of senior conservatives and southern Democrats," and played a crucial role in passing liberal legislation in spite of the opposition of the conservative coalition during the late 1950s and 1960s. After the 1970s, its role focused on legislative service, whose "principal activity [was] to disseminate detailed written materials to members of the House about upcoming legislation and policy issues, which it [did] on a daily basis when the chamber [was] in session."

== Chairs ==
- Rep. Lee Metcalf (MT-1)
- Rep. John Brademas (IN-3)
- Rep. Jim O'Hara (MI-12)
- Rep. Frank Thompson (NJ-4)
- Rep. Don Fraser (MN-5)
- Rep. Phil Burton (CA-5)
- Rep. Tom Foley (WA-5)
- Rep. Bob Eckhardt (TX-8)
- Rep. Abner Mikva (IL-10)
- Rep. Dave Obey (WI-7)
- Rep. Bill Brodhead (MI-17)
- Rep. Matt McHugh (NY-28)
- Rep. Jim Oberstar (MN-8)
- Rep. Mike Lowry (WA-7)
- Rep. Bob Wise (WV-2)
- Rep. Mike Synar (OK-2)
- Rep. David Skaggs (CO-2)

== See also ==
- Conservative Coalition
- Legislative Digest
- United States Democratic Party
- History of the United States Congress
