= Jack Perkowski =

American author & businessman

- Born: Pittsburgh, Pennsylvania, U.S.
- Education: North Catholic High School; Yale University; Harvard Business School
- Occupations: author businessman
- Notable work: Managing the Dragon: How I’m Building a Billion Dollar Business in China (Crown Business; 2008)
- Title: JFP Holdings, Ltd. (managing partner); ASIMCO Technologies (former CEO & Chairman of the Board)

Jack Perkowski is a Wall Street veteran, author, and the founder and Managing Partner of JFP Holdings, Ltd. He is also the former CEO and Chairman of the Board of ASIMCO Technologies, an automotive components company in China.

== Early life and education ==
Originally from Pittsburgh, Pennsylvania, Perkowski is a graduate of North Catholic High School. He attended Yale University on a football scholarship and received the Gordon Brown Memorial Prize, which is awarded each year to the outstanding member of the Junior Class. After graduating from Yale in 1970, he attended Harvard Business School, where he received an MBA degree with high distinction and was designated a Baker Scholar.

== Career ==
Perkowski spent 21 years as an investment banker at Paine Webber, where he raised $300 million of equity for Paine Webber in the immediate aftermath of the stock market crash of October 19, 1987 known as Black Monday.

In 1994 Perkowski founded ASIMCO (Chinese: 亚新科; pinyin: Yaxinke), an automotive components company based in Beijing, China. Under Perkowski's leadership, ASIMCO was twice named one of the “Ten Best Employers in China,”ranking third, in the last survey conducted by Hewitt Associates and 21st Century Business Herald. In 2008, he was named one of "30 Outstanding Entrepreneurs in China's Auto Components Industry Over the Country's 30 Years of Economic Reform," by China Auto News, the only foreigner to receive such distinction.

In 2009 Perkowski established JFP Holdings, a merchant bank for China, to help global companies develop and implement their China strategies and to assist Chinese companies develop global footprints.

Perkowski was mentioned in The World Is Flat: A Brief History of the Twenty-first Century by journalist and Pulitzer Prize winning author Thomas Friedman. In 2008, he authored Managing the Dragon: How I’m Building a Billion Dollar Business in China, published by Crown Business.

Periodically, Perkowski contributes to the Morning Whistle newspaper owned by 21st Century Media.

== Mr. China ==
Perkowski's business conduct is the subject of Tim Clissold book Mr. China published 2009. The book details how the private equity fund Perkowski ran invested over US$400 million into China during the reform and opening up in China within a foreign direct investment framework. The book chronicled the numerous ways the fund lost money. In the end, the fund lost almost all of its money.

== Published books ==
- Managing the Dragon: How I’m Building a Billion Dollar Business in China (Crown Business; 2008)
