= Legislative Digest =

Legislative Digest is an official publication of the House Republican Conference. It serves as the primary source of legislative analysis and preview of floor activity for Republican Members of the United States House of Representatives. As such, it functions as the Republican counterpart to the Newsroom on Dems.gov (or, until 1994, the Democratic Study Group). It originally was published weekly, but starting with the 104th Congress was published daily, and distributed in either printed or faxed form. Legislative Digest is currently published online.

As an official U.S. government publication, it is not subject to copyright and may be viewed, copied, and distributed freely by the public. For instance, Legislative Digest's summaries of bills and amendments often serve as a source for the scrolling display commentary on C-SPAN.

== See also ==
- House Republican Conference
- House Democratic Caucus
- Democratic Study Group
- United States Republican Party
- History of the United States Congress
