= ASIMCO Technologies =

Chinese automotive components manufacturer

- Founded: 1994; 32 years ago
- Founder: Jack Perkowski
- Headquarters: Beijing, China
- Area served: Worldwide
- Key people: Wang Bin (president and CEO); Gary Ding (VP - Finance); Wilson Ni (VP - Global Sales); Michael Cronin (VP - Corporate Development); Lee Liu (VP - Product Engineering); Linda Liu (VP - HR); Wu Yingxue (VP - Manufacturing Support)
- Website: www.asimco.com

ASIMCO Technologies is a large independent automotive components manufacturer headquartered in Beijing, China. With sales in excess of US$500 million, the company is one of the largest producers of automotive components in China, with 10 manufacturing operations, 52 sales offices and roughly 900 service stations across the People's Republic of China. It is the first international components manufacturer based in China, with over 15% of its annual sales made to customers in the United States, Europe and Japan.

ASIMCO specializes in the production and development of fuel injection systems, powertrains, chassis components, rotating electrics and NVH products.

In July 2010 Bain Capital became the controlling shareholder in ASIMCO for US$150 million.

== Founding ==
ASIMCO Technologies was founded in 1994 by Jack Perkowski with a business model based on accessing and transferring capital, technology and managerial techniques from the United States and Europe to upgrade existing Chinese manufacturing operations that fall under the ASIMCO umbrella. The company's first ventures into China saw them lose some US$400 million before they managed to establish themselves in the late 1990s/early 2000s.
