= House Republican Conference =

Party caucus in the US House of Representatives

- Part of: United States House of Representatives
- House Speaker: Mike Johnson (LA–4)
- Floor Leader: Steve Scalise (LA–1)
- Floor Whip: Tom Emmer (MN–6)
- Chair: Lisa McClain (MI–9)
- Ideology: Right-wing populism (Note: Including Trumpism); Conservatism
- Political position: Right-wing
- Affiliation: Republican Party
- Colors: Red
- Seats: 219 / 435

Website
- gop.gov

The House Republican Conference is the party caucus for Republicans in the United States House of Representatives. It hosts meetings, and is the primary forum for communicating the party's message to members. The conference produces a daily publication of legislative analysis under the title Legislative Digest.

When the conference holds the majority of seats, it is usually led by the speaker of the U.S. House of Representatives who is assisted on the floor by the House majority leader and the party's chief whip. When in the minority, it is led by the House minority leader, assisted by the chief whip. The conference has a chair who directs day-to-day operations and who is assisted by an elected vice chair and a secretary.

In the 119th Congress, the conference is led by Speaker Mike Johnson and Majority Leader Steve Scalise, both of Louisiana, and Majority Whip Tom Emmer of Minnesota. The current chair is Lisa McClain of Michigan, who assumed the position in 2024. Former chairs include President Gerald Ford, Vice Presidents Mike Pence and Dick Cheney, Speakers John Boehner and Kevin McCarthy, presidential candidate John Bayard Anderson, vice presidential candidate Jack Kemp, and Representatives Liz Cheney and Elise Stefanik. As a result of the 2026 elections, the party is set to lose its narrow majority in the House of Representatives in the 120th Congress.

== Current hierarchy ==
As of April 16, 2026, the conference leadership has been as follows:

- Mike Johnson (LA–4) as Speaker of the House (conference leader)
- Steve Scalise (LA–1) as House majority leader
- Tom Emmer (MN–6) as House majority whip
- Lisa McClain (MI–9) as chair of the House Republican Conference
- Blake Moore (UT–1) as vice chair of the House Republican Conference
- Erin Houchin (IN–9) as secretary of the House Republican Conference
- Jay Obernolte (CA–23) as chair of the House Republican Policy Committee
- Richard Hudson (NC–9) as chair of the National Republican Congressional Committee
- Guy Reschenthaler (PA–14) as House Republican chief deputy whip

== Leaders of the House Republican Conference ==
Congress	Leader	District	Took office	Left office	House Speaker
36th	William Pennington (1796–1862)	New Jersey 5	February 1, 1860	March 3, 1861	Himself 1860–1861
37th	Galusha A. Grow (1823–1907)	Pennsylvania 14	July 4, 1861	March 4, 1863	Himself 1861–1863
38th	Schuyler Colfax (1823–1885)	Indiana 9	December 7, 1863	March 3, 1869 (Note: Resigned to become Vice President of the United States.)	Himself 1863–1869
39th	Schuyler Colfax (1823–1885)	Indiana 9	December 7, 1863	March 3, 1869	Himself 1863–1869
40th	Schuyler Colfax (1823–1885)	Indiana 9	December 7, 1863	March 3, 1869	Himself 1863–1869
40th	Theodore M. Pomeroy (1824–1905)	New York 24	March 3, 1869	March 4, 1869	Himself 1869
41st	James G. Blaine (1830–1893)	Maine 3	March 4, 1869	March 4, 1875	Himself 1869–1875
42nd	James G. Blaine (1830–1893)	Maine 3	March 4, 1869	March 4, 1875	Himself 1869–1875
43rd	James G. Blaine (1830–1893)	Maine 3	March 4, 1869	March 4, 1875	Himself 1869–1875
44th	George W. McCrary (1835–1890)	Iowa 1	March 4, 1875	March 3, 1877	Kerr 1875–1876
44th	George W. McCrary (1835–1890)	Iowa 1	March 4, 1875	March 3, 1877	Randall 1876–1881
45th	Eugene Hale (1836–1918)	Maine 5	March 4, 1877	March 4, 1879	Randall 1876–1881
46th	William P. Frye (1830–1911)	Maine 2	March 4, 1879	March 3, 1881	Randall 1876–1881
47th	J. Warren Keifer (1836–1932)	Ohio 8	December 5, 1881	March 4, 1883	Himself 1881–1883
48th	Joseph Gurney Cannon (1836–1926)	Illinois 15	March 4, 1883	March 3, 1889	Carlisle 1883–1889
49th	Joseph Gurney Cannon (1836–1926)	Illinois 15	March 4, 1883	March 3, 1889	Carlisle 1883–1889
50th	Joseph Gurney Cannon (1836–1926)	Illinois 15	March 4, 1883	March 3, 1889	Carlisle 1883–1889
51st	Thomas Brackett Reed (1839–1902)	Maine 1	December 4, 1889	March 3, 1891	Himself 1889–1891
52nd	Thomas J. Henderson (1824–1911)	Illinois 7	March 4, 1891	March 3, 1895	Crisp 1891–1895
53rd	Thomas J. Henderson (1824–1911)	Illinois 7	March 4, 1891	March 3, 1895	Crisp 1891–1895
54th	Thomas Brackett Reed (1839–1902)	Maine 1	December 2, 1895	March 4, 1899	Himself 1895–1899
55th	Thomas Brackett Reed (1839–1902)	Maine 1	December 2, 1895	March 4, 1899	Himself 1895–1899
56th	David B. Henderson (1840–1906)	Iowa 3	December 4, 1899	March 4, 1903	Himself 1899–1903
57th	David B. Henderson (1840–1906)	Iowa 3	December 4, 1899	March 4, 1903	Himself 1899–1903
58th	Joseph Gurney Cannon (1836–1926)	Illinois 18	November 9, 1903	March 4, 1911	Himself 1903–1911
59th	Joseph Gurney Cannon (1836–1926)	Illinois 18	November 9, 1903	March 4, 1911	Himself 1903–1911
60th	Joseph Gurney Cannon (1836–1926)	Illinois 18	November 9, 1903	March 4, 1911	Himself 1903–1911
61st	Joseph Gurney Cannon (1836–1926)	Illinois 18	November 9, 1903	March 4, 1911	Himself 1903–1911
62nd	James Robert Mann (1856–1922)	Illinois 2	March 4, 1911	March 3, 1919	Clark 1911–1919
63rd	James Robert Mann (1856–1922)	Illinois 2	March 4, 1911	March 3, 1919	Clark 1911–1919
64th	James Robert Mann (1856–1922)	Illinois 2	March 4, 1911	March 3, 1919	Clark 1911–1919
65th	James Robert Mann (1856–1922)	Illinois 2	March 4, 1911	March 3, 1919	Clark 1911–1919
66th	Frederick H. Gillett (1851–1935)	Massachusetts 2	May 19, 1919	March 3, 1925	Himself 1919–1925
67th	Frederick H. Gillett (1851–1935)	Massachusetts 2	May 19, 1919	March 3, 1925	Himself 1919–1925
68th	Frederick H. Gillett (1851–1935)	Massachusetts 2	May 19, 1919	March 3, 1925	Himself 1919–1925
69th	Nicholas Longworth (1869–1931)	Ohio 1	December 7, 1925	March 4, 1931	Himself 1925–1931
70th	Nicholas Longworth (1869–1931)	Ohio 1	December 7, 1925	March 4, 1931	Himself 1925–1931
71st	Nicholas Longworth (1869–1931)	Ohio 1	December 7, 1925	March 4, 1931	Himself 1925–1931
72nd	Bertrand Snell (1870–1958)	New York 31	March 4, 1931	January 3, 1939	Garner 1931–1933
73rd	Bertrand Snell (1870–1958)	New York 31	March 4, 1931	January 3, 1939	Rainey 1933–1934
74th	Bertrand Snell (1870–1958)	New York 31	March 4, 1931	January 3, 1939	Byrns 1935–1936
74th	Bertrand Snell (1870–1958)	New York 31	March 4, 1931	January 3, 1939	Bankhead 1936–1940
75th	Bertrand Snell (1870–1958)	New York 31	March 4, 1931	January 3, 1939	Bankhead 1936–1940
76th	Joseph W. Martin Jr. (1884–1968)	Massachusetts 14	January 3, 1939	January 3, 1959	Bankhead 1936–1940
76th	Joseph W. Martin Jr. (1884–1968)	Massachusetts 14	January 3, 1939	January 3, 1959	Rayburn 1940–1947
77th	Joseph W. Martin Jr. (1884–1968)	Massachusetts 14	January 3, 1939	January 3, 1959	Rayburn 1940–1947
78th	Joseph W. Martin Jr. (1884–1968)	Massachusetts 14	January 3, 1939	January 3, 1959	Rayburn 1940–1947
79th	Joseph W. Martin Jr. (1884–1968)	Massachusetts 14	January 3, 1939	January 3, 1959	Rayburn 1940–1947
80th	Joseph W. Martin Jr. (1884–1968)	Massachusetts 14	January 3, 1939	January 3, 1959	Himself 1947–1949
81st	Joseph W. Martin Jr. (1884–1968)	Massachusetts 14	January 3, 1939	January 3, 1959	Rayburn 1949–1953
82nd	Joseph W. Martin Jr. (1884–1968)	Massachusetts 14	January 3, 1939	January 3, 1959	Rayburn 1949–1953
83rd	Joseph W. Martin Jr. (1884–1968)	Massachusetts 14	January 3, 1939	January 3, 1959	Himself 1953–1955
84th	Joseph W. Martin Jr. (1884–1968)	Massachusetts 14	January 3, 1939	January 3, 1959	Rayburn 1955–1961
85th	Joseph W. Martin Jr. (1884–1968)	Massachusetts 14	January 3, 1939	January 3, 1959	Rayburn 1955–1961
86th	Charles A. Halleck (1900–1986)	Indiana 2	January 3, 1959	January 3, 1965	Rayburn 1955–1961
87th	Charles A. Halleck (1900–1986)	Indiana 2	January 3, 1959	January 3, 1965	Rayburn 1955–1961
87th	Charles A. Halleck (1900–1986)	Indiana 2	January 3, 1959	January 3, 1965	McCormack 1962–1971
88th	Charles A. Halleck (1900–1986)	Indiana 2	January 3, 1959	January 3, 1965	McCormack 1962–1971
89th	Gerald Ford (1913–2006)	Michigan 5	January 3, 1965	December 6, 1973	McCormack 1962–1971
90th	Gerald Ford (1913–2006)	Michigan 5	January 3, 1965	December 6, 1973	McCormack 1962–1971
91st	Gerald Ford (1913–2006)	Michigan 5	January 3, 1965	December 6, 1973	McCormack 1962–1971
92nd	Gerald Ford (1913–2006)	Michigan 5	January 3, 1965	December 6, 1973	Albert 1971–1977
93rd	Gerald Ford (1913–2006)	Michigan 5	January 3, 1965	December 6, 1973	Albert 1971–1977
93rd	John Jacob Rhodes (1916–2003)	Arizona 1	December 7, 1973	January 3, 1981	Albert 1971–1977
94th	John Jacob Rhodes (1916–2003)	Arizona 1	December 7, 1973	January 3, 1981	Albert 1971–1977
95th	John Jacob Rhodes (1916–2003)	Arizona 1	December 7, 1973	January 3, 1981	O'Neill 1977–1987
96th	John Jacob Rhodes (1916–2003)	Arizona 1	December 7, 1973	January 3, 1981	O'Neill 1977–1987
97th	Robert H. Michel (1923–2017)	Illinois 18	January 3, 1981	January 3, 1995	O'Neill 1977–1987
98th	Robert H. Michel (1923–2017)	Illinois 18	January 3, 1981	January 3, 1995	O'Neill 1977–1987
99th	Robert H. Michel (1923–2017)	Illinois 18	January 3, 1981	January 3, 1995	O'Neill 1977–1987
100th	Robert H. Michel (1923–2017)	Illinois 18	January 3, 1981	January 3, 1995	Wright 1987–1989
101st	Robert H. Michel (1923–2017)	Illinois 18	January 3, 1981	January 3, 1995	Wright 1987–1989
101st	Robert H. Michel (1923–2017)	Illinois 18	January 3, 1981	January 3, 1995	Foley 1989–1995
102nd	Robert H. Michel (1923–2017)	Illinois 18	January 3, 1981	January 3, 1995	Foley 1989–1995
103rd	Robert H. Michel (1923–2017)	Illinois 18	January 3, 1981	January 3, 1995	Foley 1989–1995
104th	Newt Gingrich (born 1943)	Georgia 6	January 3, 1995	January 3, 1999 (Note: Resigned from office and from Congress.)	Himself 1995–1999
105th	Newt Gingrich (born 1943)	Georgia 6	January 3, 1995	January 3, 1999	Himself 1995–1999
106th	Dennis Hastert (1942–2026)	Illinois 14	January 6, 1999	January 3, 2007	Himself 1999–2007
107th	Dennis Hastert (1942–2026)	Illinois 14	January 6, 1999	January 3, 2007	Himself 1999–2007
108th	Dennis Hastert (1942–2026)	Illinois 14	January 6, 1999	January 3, 2007	Himself 1999–2007
109th	Dennis Hastert (1942–2026)	Illinois 14	January 6, 1999	January 3, 2007	Himself 1999–2007
110th	John Boehner (born 1949)	Ohio 8	January 3, 2007	October 29, 2015	Pelosi 2007–2011
111th	John Boehner (born 1949)	Ohio 8	January 3, 2007	October 29, 2015	Pelosi 2007–2011
112th	John Boehner (born 1949)	Ohio 8	January 3, 2007	October 29, 2015	Himself 2011–2015
113th	John Boehner (born 1949)	Ohio 8	January 3, 2007	October 29, 2015	Himself 2011–2015
114th	John Boehner (born 1949)	Ohio 8	January 3, 2007	October 29, 2015	Himself 2011–2015
114th	Paul Ryan (born 1970)	Wisconsin 1	October 29, 2015	January 3, 2019	Himself 2015–2019
115th	Paul Ryan (born 1970)	Wisconsin 1	October 29, 2015	January 3, 2019	Himself 2015–2019
116th	Kevin McCarthy (born 1965)	California 23	January 3, 2019	October 3, 2023 (Note: Kevin McCarthy was vacated as speaker and House Republican Leader on October 3, 2023, until the election of Mike Johnson on October 25.)	Pelosi 2019–2023
117th	Kevin McCarthy (born 1965)	California 23	January 3, 2019	October 3, 2023	Pelosi 2019–2023
118th	Kevin McCarthy (born 1965)	California 20	January 3, 2019	October 3, 2023	Himself 2023
118th	Vacant		October 3, 2023	October 25, 2023	McHenry (Note: This person served as speaker pro tempore.) 2023
118th	Mike Johnson (born 1972)	Louisiana 4	October 25, 2023	Incumbent	Himself 2023–present
119th	Mike Johnson (born 1972)	Louisiana 4	October 25, 2023	Incumbent	Himself 2023–present
120th	Jim Jordan (born 1964)	Ohio 4	Assuming office January 3, 2027		TBD assuming office 2027

== Conference chairs ==
The conference chair is elected each Congress.

Chairman	State	Congress	Dates
Justin S. Morrill	VT	38th–39th	1863–1867
N/A		40th	1867–1869
Robert C. Schenck	OH	41st	1869–1871
Nathaniel P. Banks	MA	41st	1869–1871
Austin Blair	MI	42nd	1871–1873
Horace Maynard	TN	43rd	1873–1875
George W. McCrary	IA	44th	1875–1877
Eugene Hale	ME	45th	1877–1879
William P. Frye	ME	46th	1879–1881
George M. Robeson	NJ	47th	1881–1883
Joseph G. Cannon	IL	48th–50th	1883–1889
Thomas J. Henderson	IL	51st–53rd	1889–1895
Charles H. Grosvenor	OH	54th–55th	1895–1899
Joseph G. Cannon	IL	56th–57th	1899–1903
William P. Hepburn	IA	58th–60th	1903–1909
Frank D. Currier	NH	61st–62nd	1909–1913
William S. Greene	MA	63rd–65th	1913–1919
Horace M. Towner	IA	66th–67th	1919–1923
Sydney Anderson	MN	68th	1923–1925
Willis C. Hawley	OR	69th–72nd	1925–1933
Robert Luce	MA	73rd	1933–1935
Frederick R. Lehlbach	NJ	74th	1935–1937
Roy Woodruff	MI	75th–81st	1937–1951
Clifford Hope	KS	82nd–84th	1951–1957
Charles B. Hoeven	IA	85th–87th	1957–1963
Gerald Ford	MI	88th	1963–1965
Melvin Laird	WI	89th–90th	1965–1969
John B. Anderson	IL	91st–95th	1969–1979
Samuel L. Devine	OH	96th	1979–1981
Jack Kemp	NY	97th–99th	1981–1987
Dick Cheney	WY	100th	1987–1989
Jerry Lewis	CA	101st–102nd	1989–1993
Dick Armey	TX	103rd	1993–1995
John Boehner	OH	104th–105th	1995–1999
J. C. Watts	OK	106th–107th	1999–2003
Deborah Pryce	OH	108th–109th	2003–2007
Adam Putnam	FL	110th	2007–2009
Mike Pence	IN	111th	2009–2011
Jeb Hensarling	TX	112th	2011–2013
Cathy McMorris Rodgers	WA	113th—115th	2013–2019
Liz Cheney	WY	116th—117th	2019–2021 (Note: Removal as conference chair)
Elise Stefanik	NY	117th—118th	2021–2025
Lisa McClain	MI	119th	2025–present

== Vice chairs ==
The vice chair is next in rank after the House Republican Conference Chair. Like the chair, the vice chair is elected by a vote of all Republican House members before each Congress. Among other duties, the vice chair has a seat on both the Steering and Policy Committees.

- Robert Stafford of Vermont (1971)
- Samuel L. Devine of Ohio (1971–1979)
- Jack Edwards of Alabama (1979–1985)
- Lynn Morley Martin of Illinois (1985–1989)
- Bill McCollum of Florida (1989–1995)
- Susan Molinari of New York (1995–1997)
- Jennifer Dunn of Washington (1997–1999)
- Tillie Fowler of Florida (1999–2001)
- Deborah Pryce of Ohio (2001–2003)
- Jack Kingston of Georgia (2003–2007)
- Kay Granger of Texas (2007–2009)
- Cathy McMorris Rodgers of Washington (2009–2013)
- Lynn Jenkins of Kansas (2013–2017)
- Doug Collins of Georgia (2017–2019)
- Mark Walker of North Carolina (2019–2021)
- Mike Johnson of Louisiana (2021–2023)
- Blake Moore of Utah (2023–present)

== Secretaries ==
List of successive secretaries of the House Republican Conference
Congress	Name	State	Term start	Term end
Position established
90th	Dick Poff	Virginia	January 3, 1967	August 29, 1972
91st	Dick Poff	Virginia	January 3, 1967	August 29, 1972
92nd	Dick Poff	Virginia	January 3, 1967	August 29, 1972
92nd	Jack Edwards	Alabama	August 29, 1972	January 3, 1979
93rd	Jack Edwards	Alabama	August 29, 1972	January 3, 1979
94th	Jack Edwards	Alabama	August 29, 1972	January 3, 1979
95th	Jack Edwards	Alabama	August 29, 1972	January 3, 1979
96th	Clair Burgener	California	January 3, 1979	January 3, 1985
97th	Clair Burgener	California	January 3, 1979	January 3, 1985
98th	Clair Burgener	California	January 3, 1979	January 3, 1985
99th	Robert J. Lagomarsino	California	January 3, 1985	January 3, 1989
100th	Robert J. Lagomarsino	California	January 3, 1985	January 3, 1989
101st	Vin Weber	Minnesota	January 3, 1989	January 3, 1993
102nd	Vin Weber	Minnesota	January 3, 1989	January 3, 1993
103rd	Tom DeLay	Texas	January 3, 1993	January 3, 1995
104th	Barbara Vucanovich	Nevada	January 3, 1995	January 3, 1997
105th	Jennifer Dunn	Washington	January 3, 1997	July 17, 1997
105th	Tillie Fowler	Florida	July 17, 1997	January 3, 1999
106th	Deborah Pryce	Ohio	January 3, 1999	January 3, 2001
107th	Barbara Cubin	Wyoming	January 3, 2001	January 3, 2003
108th	John Doolittle	California	January 3, 2003	January 3, 2007
109th	John Doolittle	California	January 3, 2003	January 3, 2007
110th	John Carter	Texas	January 3, 2007	January 3, 2013
111th	John Carter	Texas	January 3, 2007	January 3, 2013
112th	John Carter	Texas	January 3, 2007	January 3, 2013
113th	Virginia Foxx	North Carolina	January 3, 2013	January 3, 2017
114th	Virginia Foxx	North Carolina	January 3, 2013	January 3, 2017
115th	Jason Smith	Missouri	January 3, 2017	January 3, 2021
116th	Jason Smith	Missouri	January 3, 2017	January 3, 2021
117th	Richard Hudson	North Carolina	January 3, 2021	January 3, 2023
118th	Lisa McClain	Michigan	January 3, 2023	January 3, 2025
119th	Erin Houchin	Indiana	January 3, 2025	Present

== See also ==
- House Democratic Caucus
- Senate Republican Conference
- Senate Democratic Caucus
