= American Chamber of Commerce in the People's Republic of China =

Business organization

The American Chamber of Commerce in China 中国美国商会
- Founded: 1919
- Purpose: Business advocacy
- Location: Beijing, China
- Region served: China
- Chair: Alvin Liu
- Vice Chairs: Su Cheng Harris-Simpson, Min Qin, Travis Tanner
- Website: amchamchina.org

The American Chamber of Commerce in the People's Republic of China (AmCham China) is a nonprofit, nongovernmental organization it has 4,000 individual members from 900 companies operating across China. The chamber provides information, networking opportunities, business support services, and advocacy to promote a mutually beneficial bilateral business environment for the U.S. and China.

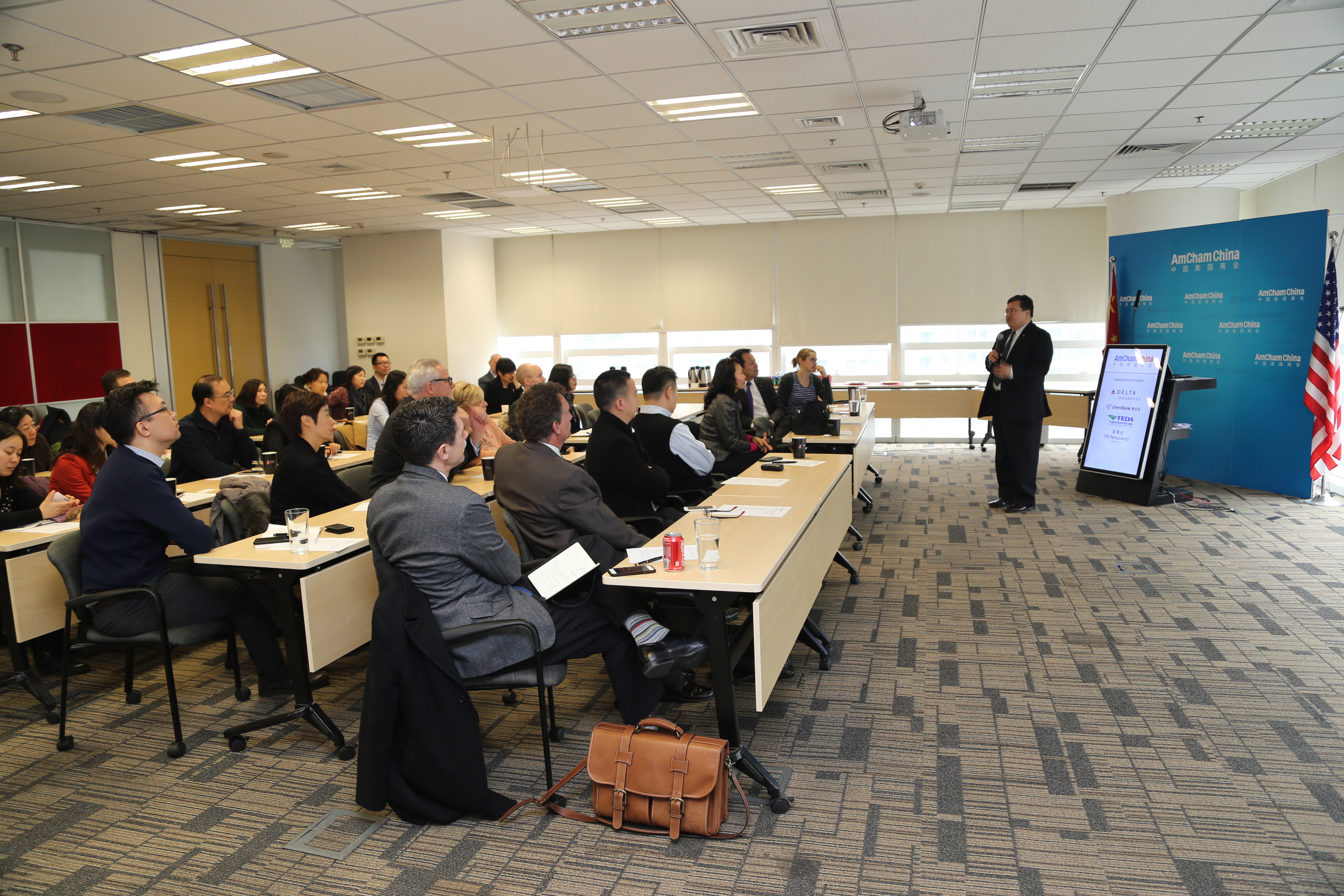
Conference room at AmCham Beijing.

AmCham China is the only officially recognized chamber of commerce representing American businesses in mainland China. They have more than 50 industry- and issue-specific forums and committees. These working groups serve as a platform for the American business community and other organizations in China to foster understanding, share information, pursue common interests, promote trade and investment, and strengthen cooperation.

In December 2020, AmCham China stirred controversy and criticism by hosting Wang Chen, a U.S. sanctioned member of the Chinese Communist Party (CCP), at its annual appreciation dinner.

== History ==
The first American Chamber of Commerce in Beijing (then Peking) was established in 1919, with eight founding member companies, including Standard Oil. The organization disbanded when war broke out, and the chamber did not reform until 1981. AmCham China was formally registered with the Ministry of Civil Affairs in 1991. As a non-partisan, not-for-profit organization dedicated to supporting and promoting the business success of its members, AmCham China is not affiliated with any branch of government.

== Structure ==
Currently, its national level operations are guided by the Chairperson, three Vice-Chairpersons, and 10 governors who comprise the organization's Board of Governors. All voting members of AmCham China are eligible to participate in an annual election to select the Board.

=== Chapters ===
AmCham China's headquarters are located in Beijing's Central Business District. It also has a Central China Chapter in Wuhan, a Northeast China Chapter in Dalian and Shenyang, and a Tianjin Chapter. The three chapters are headed by Chapter Executive Committees that cater specifically to regional members. These executive committees ensure that every Chapter is responsive to the needs of local AmCham China members.

=== Board of Governors ===
The Board of Governors consists of 14 voting individuals: the Chairperson, three Vice-Chairpersons, and 10 governors. The Treasurer, the General Counsel, the President, the most recent former Chairperson of the Board of Governors, and the Chairperson of the Executive Committee of any Chapter serve as non-voting ex-officio members. The Board of Governors is responsible for overseeing and making policy decisions for AmCham China. It meets to discuss ongoing matters of the chamber at least six times per year. The Board also selects and appoints the President to supervise and direct all employees of the Chamber.

==== Chairperson ====
The Chairperson must be a citizen of the United States and have a record of active participation in the Board of Governors, a Chamber committee, or a Chamber forum within the two years prior the election. The Chairperson is eligible for two one-year terms, but it is possible for former Chairpersons to run again for additional non-consecutive terms. At the end of one's term, the former Chairperson may continue serving as a non-voting ex-officio member of the Board unless otherwise elected as a regular Board member.

In addition to playing a general supervisory role in AmCham China's organizational development, the Chairperson presides over all Board of Governors meetings, executes the decisions of the Board of Governors, appoints the head of each committee and forum, and represents the chamber in external relations. The Chairperson also appoints the Treasurer and General Counsel of the Board of Governors.

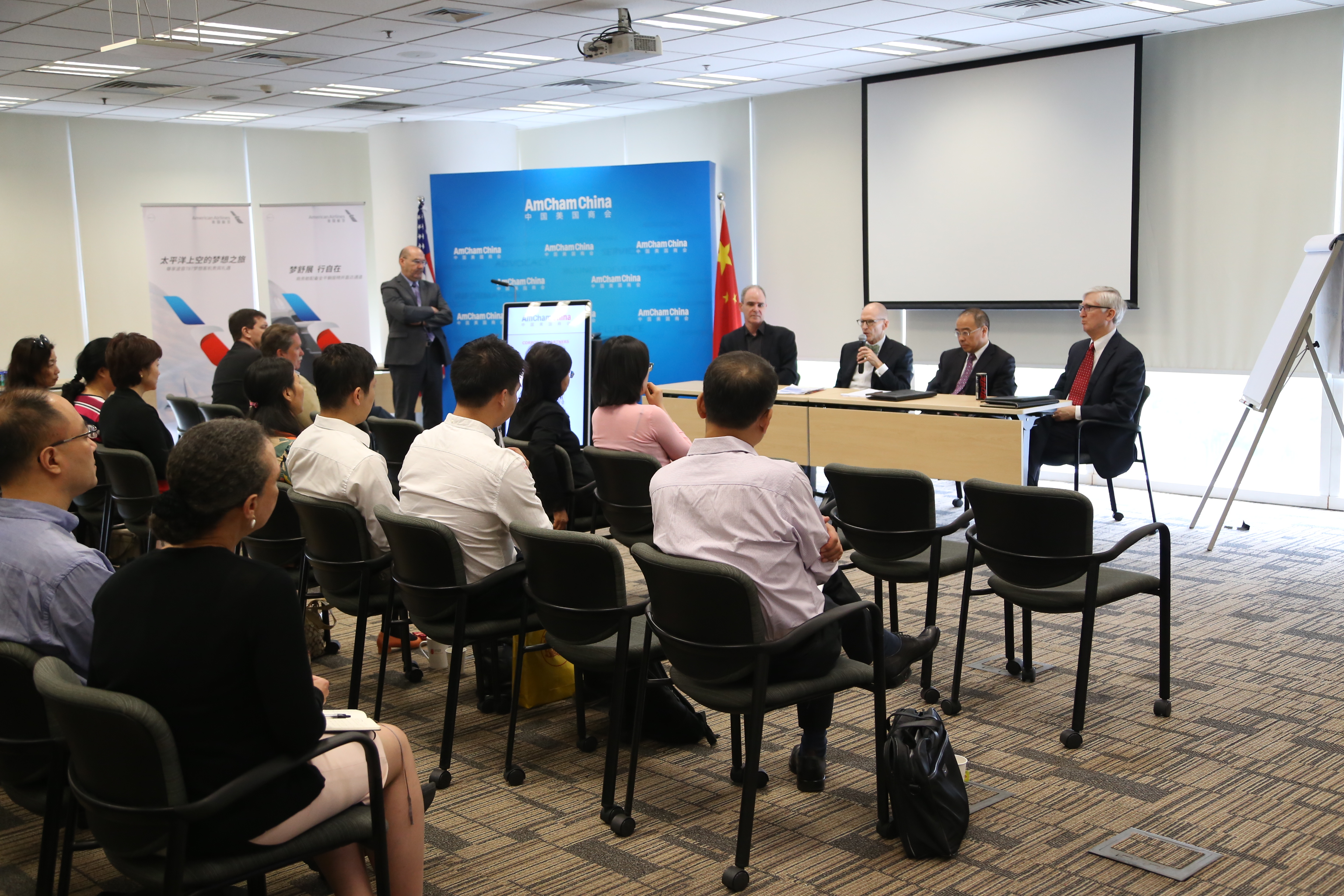
AmCham China leadership debriefs the "D.C. Doorknock".

==== List of Past Chairpersons ====
- 2016–present William "Bill Zarit"
- 2015-2016 James Zimmerman
- 2013-2014 Greg Gilligan
- 2011-2012 Ted Dean
- 2009-2010 John D. Watkins, Jr.
- 2007-2008 James Zimmerman
- 2005-2006 Emory Williams, Jr.
- 2004 Jim Gradoville
- 2002-2003 Christian Murck
- 2000-2001 Timothy P. Stratford
- 1999 Richard Latham
- 1998 (Second half) Min-Hwa Hu Kupfer
- 1998 (First half) Rudy Schlais
- 1997 John Holden
- 1996 James L. McGregor
- 1995 William Warwick
- 1994 Phil Carmichael
- 1992-1993 John Hart
- 1990 Irl Hicks
- 1989 Lucille Barale
- 1985-1986 Sally Harpole
- 1983-1984 Peter Lighte

==== Vice-Chairpersons ====
The three Vice-Chairpersons provide consultation and assume appropriate roles as designated by the Chairperson. In the Chairpersons absence, a Vice-Chairperson may preside over meetings and assume the Chairpersonship in the case of the Chairpersons resignation.

=== Election Committee ===
The Election Committee supervises and reviews the election process for Board of Governors positions. It is selected by the Board of Governors from voting members of AmCham China. Election Committee members are prohibited from running for any position on the Board of Governors in the upcoming election, and current officers or members of the Board of Governors may not serve on the Election Committee.

=== Membership ===
AmCham China's membership includes 4,000 individuals and 900 companies. For an annual fee, membership is offered to major multinational companies, small and medium-sized enterprises, non-profit organizations, entrepreneurs, and other individuals involved with China.

==== Categories ====
In 2000, AmCham China specified 10 different membership categories for businesses, nonprofits, and individuals. The Board of Governors then introduced five streamlined membership options in 2012. The new main categories are as follows:

1) Large corporate: companies with global revenue of at least US$50 million.

2) Small corporate: companies with global revenue between 1 million and US$50 million.

3) Other corporate: companies with global revenue of less than US$1 million.

4) Individual: US citizens who are entrepreneurs or work for non-US companies

5) Other professionals: US citizens who work for nonprofits or educational institutions, and young professionals between 18 and 30 years of age or senior professionals over 60 years of age.

== Publications ==
American Business in China White Paper

For two decades, the annual American Business in China White Paper has been one of AmCham China's signature products and codified members’ collective insights on the current business climate in China, while setting the chamber's official position regarding high-priority issues that affect the American business community in China. The White Paper also serves as an annual assessment of the progress made on policies and regulations and is a key platform for discussion and engagement with the Chinese and U.S. government.

The White Paper includes an annual Recommendation Scorecard measuring progress in a wide range of policy areas. The 2017 White Paper found the most significant progress in banking and capital markets regulation, business sustainability and non-profit engagement. Meanwhile, several areas, including agriculture, automotive policy, and securities investment saw little or no legislative progress.

Business Now Magazine

Business Now is AmCham China's flagship publication, released both online and in print six times annually. The magazine circulates to card-holding members, U.S. and Chinese government officials and businesses around Beijing, Tianjin, Dalian, Shenyang, and Wuhan.

The magazine provides insights on the U.S.-China business environment, penned by chamber members, in-house policy analysts, and staffers. Each issue includes such features as a cover story addressing a current issue, a report on policy changes and their implications for business, member commentaries, book reviews, and in-depth interviews with senior business leaders.

== Activities ==
=== Forums and Committees ===
Working groups include, but are not limited to, the Aerospace Forum, Clean Tech Committee, Environmental Industry Forum, Financial Services Forum, Intellectual Property Rights Forum, Oil, Energy, and Power Forum, Real Estate and Development Industry Forum, Standards Forum, Business Sustainability Committee, Customs and Trade Committee, Legal Committee, Women's Professional Committee, and Young Professionals Committee.

=== US-China Aviation Cooperation Program ===
For more than 14 years, the Civil Aviation Administration of China (CAAC), the Federal Aviation Administration (FAA), the U.S. Trade and Development Agency (USTDA), and the Transportation Security Administration (TSA) have worked together to promote U.S.-China aviation cooperation through a unique public-private partnership known as the U.S.-China Aviation Cooperation Program (ACP).

Building on the history of aviation cooperation that began in the 1970s, the US-China Aviation Cooperation Program (ACP) promotes continued industry-wide collaboration between China and the United States. Formally founded in 2004, the government-industry partnership streamlined American companies’ interactions with the CAAC.

There also are other bilateral aviation agreements—U.S.-China Bilateral Aviation Safety Agreement, Bilateral Air Services Agreement; and Airworthiness, and Flight Standards Dialogues that provide the framework and standards to support the work of ACP's respective industries. Its flagship publication is a quarterly magazine called Partnership. ACP is endorsed by both the US and Chinese governments, drawing from the partnership of six public members and 36 corporate members.

=== US-China Healthcare Cooperation Program ===
The U.S.-China Healthcare Cooperation Program (HCP) is a collaborative initiative, founded in 2011, based on a joint public-private partnership in healthcare announcement, striving to build closer working relations between the U.S. and China governments while leveraging healthcare industry strengths in order to foster long-term cooperation with China in the areas of technology, public health, policy research, training, and R&D, and to support the Chinese government's goal of enhancing patient access to healthcare services in China. Government agencies, including the US Department of Health and Human Services (HHS), U.S. Department of Commerce, US Trade and Development Agency (USTDA), the National Health and Family Planning Commission of China, and Ministry of Commerce of China, have participated and provided guidance in this program. The Program follows two highly successful, siting US-China public-private partnerships that operate under AmCham China's umbrella (Aviation Cooperation Program and the Energy Cooperation Program).

HCP membership includes 27 companies and 7 non-profit organizations and associations, covering healthcare services, medical devices, pharmaceutical companies, medical insurance, healthcare IT, consulting and various other areas. The Program features four working groups addressing key issues shaping healthcare development in China, including Hospital management and Healthcare IT, Healthcare Financing, Disease Prevention & Health Management, and Quality & Safety that each host various workshops, trainings, and study tours."

U.S.-China Energy Cooperation Program (ECP)’s mission is to act as a bilateral public private partnership platform to facilitate business cooperation between US and Chinese companies, advance sustainable development in the energy industry and combat climate change. Since its inauguration, the US-China Energy Cooperation Program (ECP) has actively engaged in in-depth exchanges and cooperation with the relevant government agencies, industry groups, scientific research institutions and enterprises of the United States and China. At present, more than 20 Chinese companies have long-term strategic cooperation agreements. Each year ECP holds business workshops and field visits in a dozen of provinces. ECP's working groups cover a range of issues including energy supply, energy systems and integration, energy demand, crosscutting support.

=== Export Compliance Working Group ===
Established in 2006, the Export Compliance Working Group (ECWG) draws from membership companies of AmCham China as well as AmCham Shanghai. Its focus is information-sharing, collaboration, and policy recommendations for U.S.-China high-tech trade.

=== U.S.-China Agriculture & Food Partnership ===
The U.S.-China Agriculture & Food Partnership seeks to resolve problems and create opportunities for the improved coordination and development of the U.S. and Chinese food and agriculture industries. Since 2013, it has linked the public, private, and NGO sectors to promote food security, safety, and sustainability.

The U.S.-China Agriculture & Food Partnership focuses specifically on changing both the tone and substance of the bilateral relationship. By resolving problems and creating opportunities through increased coordination, more effective issue advocacy and the development of a more positive relationship between the U.S. and Chinese food and agriculture industries. The organization also serves as a platform to connect business with relevant government entities in a more coherent way and builds upon themes of food safety, food security and sustainable agriculture.

== Criticism ==
In December 2020, Bloomberg News reported that AmCham China hosted Wang Chen, a sanctioned member of the CCP, at its annual appreciation dinner.

Following the report, US Congressman Michael McCaul, Lead Republican on the House Committee on Foreign Affairs said in a statement, "It is unconscionable for the American Chamber of Commerce in China to host a Chinese Communist Party official under U.S. sanctions at its annual appreciation gala. If American businesses are being forced to celebrate and toast Party officials who trample our values, then the U.S. government must continue to do all it can to protect our national interests. I trust AmCham China and its Board of Governors will explain this truly regrettable and disappointing decision in a transparent manner to their companies and Congress without delay. Their reputation as a credible voice of American business depends on it."
