= John D. Kuhns =

American investment banker and writer

- Born: Lake Forest, Illinois
- Occupations: author, artist, businessman, and investment banker

John D. Kuhns is an author, artist, developer, private equity investor, and investment banker. His published fiction takes place in both domestic and foreign settings, while much of his business career has been in the infrastructure and alternative energy industries. He has founded and taken five companies public. In addition to the United States, Kuhns also has established companies and developed projects in Argentina, Brazil, China, Costa Rica, England, Honduras, India, Ireland, Mexico, Papua New Guinea, Sri Lanka, and Wales. Kuhns has been interviewed for CNBC, Reuters Insider, Fox Business, Forbes, Bloomberg, Bloomberg Law, The Edge, the Washington Post, The World, National Public Radio's magazine, The Economist, The Guardian, and other international media on the business and economic climate in China and Southeast Asia.

Most recently, he was interviewed by the Washington Post and The World about his company, Numa Numa Resources, and its business in Bougainville, especially as it involves President Ishmael Toroama, the President of the Autonomous Region of Bougainville, and the reconstruction of the Panguna Mine, one of the world's largest copper and gold mines, which has lain dormant for over thirty years but which, once again operational, can pay for Bougainville's independence.

== Education ==
Born in Lake Forest, Illinois to college professors, Kuhns spent his formative years in Takoma Park, Maryland, a suburb of Washington, D.C., where he was educated in the public schools.

A member of the Class of 1972 at Georgetown University, he graduated with an A.B in Sociology and in Fine Arts. Kuhns was a four-year starter at middle linebacker on the Georgetown varsity football team. Leading the team in tackles for two years, and the second leading tackler in his other two campaigns, Kuhns was elected a team captain in his senior year. He was inducted into the Georgetown University Athletic Hall of Fame in 1994.

A sculptor, Kuhns received a scholarship to study fine arts at the University of Chicago in 1973 after a Georgetown professor, without Kuhns' knowledge, submitted his art portfolio to the school. After complementing his studies as a teaching assistant in sculpture and drawing to undergraduates and an art and culture critic for the Maroon, the university's student newspaper, he graduated with a Master's in Fine Arts degree in 1975. Subsequently, he attended Harvard Business School in Boston, Massachusetts, graduating with a Master's in Business Administration degree in 1977. During his summer between years at business school, he worked on the bond trading desk at the investment banking firm of Salomon Brothers in its Boston office.

== Career ==
Kuhns' career as an investment banker began when he joined Salomon Brothers in New York in 1977 in its public finance department, working on publicly owned electric utility projects. Later, he left with a group of Salomon Brothers partners to form J.J. Lowrey & Co., a bond trading and project finance investment bank including two partners who later embarked on respective campaigns for President of the United States, where he was a general partner.

In 1986, Kuhns acquired control of the Laidlaw, Adams & Peck investment bank, one of the oldest continuously operated financial firms in the United States, and changed the firm's name to Kuhns Brothers & Laidlaw. Under his direction, Kuhns Brothers has financed many companies, including the IPO for CalEnergy, one of the world's largest geothermal power corporations. After 1989 Kuhns focused on financing domestic alternative energy companies, power technology ventures and infrastructure companies, as well as many foreign issuers, mainly from China.

As an entrepreneur, Kuhns has taken 5 of his own companies public.

In 1981, Kuhns founded Catalyst Energy Corporation, one of the first publicly traded independent power producers in America. In 1986, the company completed its IPO and became listed on the New York Stock Exchange under the symbol NYSE: CE. Catalyst became the largest independent power company generating electricity for sale to utilities in 1988. The company became known for its ability to take advantage of loopholes, such as buying a St. Louis steam generator, and leasing the generator's distribution pipes from the state of Missouri. Because Catalyst did not own the distribution pipes, it was exempt from many regulations. In 1984 while CEO of Catalyst, Kuhns made his first visit to China, going to Chengdu to purchase hydroelectric generating equipment, and becoming the first American to do so in the process. In 1987, Kuhns supervised the IPO of Catalyst's steam power affiliate—Catalyst Thermal Energy Corporation. By 1988, Catalyst had revenues of $417 million and assets worth $1 billion, and was the fastest-growing public company in America from 1982 to 1987 according to Inc. Magazine.

Kuhns continued to develop and invest in alternative energy and renewable energy projects throughout China and other parts of the developing world. In 1992 he founded and was the chairman and CEO of The New World Power Corporation, a wholly renewable-based independent power producer. His work with New World focused on alternate energy. At New World, he developed and financed hydroelectric projects in Costa Rica, China, Argentina, and Mexico, and wind farms in the United Kingdom and the United States.

In 2006 as chairman and CEO, Kuhns formed China Hydroelectric Corporation, an owner and developer of hydroelectric projects in China. China Hydroelectric Corporation began trading on the New York Stock Exchange in 2010.

Kuhns organized the China Hand Fund, which invested in companies in China, in 2007.

In 2012, Kuhns became executive chairman of NanoFlex Power Corporation (formerly Global Photonic Energy Corporation), a developer of intellectual property which holds over 600 patents worldwide in advanced solar technology. Kuhns had been an investor and board member of the company since 1999. NanoFlex went public in 2013.

In 2016 Kuhns established an organization now called Numa Numa Resources, Inc. to develop and invest in infrastructure and other business ventures in the Autonomous Region of Bougainville, an island archipelago located in the South Pacific possessing billions in copper, gold, fisheries, exotic hardwoods, and other valuable natural resources.

Numa Numa's goal is to become a leading commercial enterprise in Bougainville. It has been selected by the clans who own the Panguna Mine and the Autonomous Bougainville government to help redevelop and reconstruct the Panguna Mine, and is also involved in gold dealing, road building, mineral exploration, the redevelopment of a limestone quarry and lime calcination project, as well as a hydropower-based, fully integrated electric generation and distribution utility..

== Books ==
Kuhns first novel was loosely based on his hydroelectric business in China. China Fortunes was released in 2010 by Wiley. The book follows a protagonist named Jack Davis, "an American financier lured by the spectacular promise of the confusing land, from early success and a meteoric IPO that seems too easy, to treachery and loss, and triumphant financial and emotional renewal."

Jing Daily described it as a "vivid illustration" of "the opportunities and obstacles experienced by foreign businesspeople in the early days of China's sometimes uncomfortable embrace of capitalism…China Fortunes manages to tread the fine line between entertainment and education, never losing sight of the adventure and mind-expanding aspects of living and working in China as a foreigner." The book received positive reviews with Terry McDonell, the former managing editor of Sports Illustrated, calling it, "a smart and stylish take on what business really is in modern China. Kuhns knows both cold, and most important, he can tell a great story…ironic, fast moving and sharply observed. It will lock you in."

Kuhns' second novel, Ballad of a Tin Man, was published in 2016 by Post Hill Press. Once again the story line involves business, but the setting changes from China to South Florida, and this time protagonist Jack Davis needs help from some notable underworld figures.

Kuhns' third novel, South of the Clouds, a story about smuggling jade over the Sino-Burmese border in China's southwestern province of Yunnan, was published by Post Hill Press in 2018. "An engaging novel with a protagonist who remains appealing, even as he tiptoes into shady territory,"—Kirkus Review.

Kuhns' most recent novel, They Call Me Ishmael, was published by Post Hill Press in February 2022. "A captivating political tale, dramatically gripping and historically enlightening." The book is the story of Ishmael Toroama, the former guerilla leader of the Bougainville Revolutionary Army in the civil war—called "the Crisis"—fought between Bougainville and Papua New Guinea from 1989 to 2001. Once the Crisis was resolved, Bougainville earned the right to conduct an independence referendum, and in 2019 98% of its citizens voted to leave Papua New Guinea. In 2020, Toroama was elected President of Bougainville, putting him in a position to lead the newest nation on earth.
