= Servants of Christ Jesus =

Catholic clerical association

- Abbreviation: SCJ
- Formation: February 10, 2004
- Founders: John Ignatius, Paul Koska
- Founded at: Steubenville, Ohio
- Type: Clerical Association of the Faithful
- Headquarters: Denver, Colorado
- Location: United States
- Members: 10
- Superior: John Ignatius
- Ministry: Preaching, teaching, spiritual direction
- Parent organization: Catholic Church
- Website: scjesus.org

The Servants of Christ Jesus (abbreviated SCJ) is a Catholic private association of the faithful in the Ignatian and Franciscan traditions, following the formula of the Institute of Saint Ignatius of Loyola and based in Denver, Colorado.

Two of its members, Paul Kostka and John Ignatius, were commissioned by Pope Francis as Missionaries of Mercy for the Extraordinary Jubilee of Mercy in 2016.

== History ==
The Servants were founded on Ash Wednesday of 2004, by then-Franciscan University students Matthew Fenter and Aron Little who had both been inspired to found a religious order through the Spiritual Exercises of Ignatius of Loyola. Bishop Robert Conlon of the Diocese of Steubenville received their request to form an association of the lay Christian faithful. The two men offered their First Professions on October 29, 2005, and received the black cassocks (the habits for professed brothers) and new names: Brother Paul Fenter and Brother John Ignatius.

In June 2006, the community moved to the Archdiocese of Denver at the invitation of Archbishop Charles Chaput, in large part due to the presence of Saint John Vianney Seminary there. In 2009, Chaput recognized the group as an Association of the Lay Christian Faithful in the Archdiocese, and in 2013 Archbishop Samuel Aquila recognized them as a Clerical Association of the Faithful under the Code of Canon Law.

On May 18, 2013, the two founders, Frs Paul Kostka and John Ignatius, were ordained as the first priests of the community by Aquila in the Cathedral Basilica of the Immaculate Conception. The community's third and most recently ordained priest is Fr. James Claver, who became a priest in May 2016. Fr. Paul Kostka and Fr. John Ignatius, were commissioned by Pope Francis as Missionaries of Mercy for the Extraordinary Jubilee of Mercy in 2016. As of April 2022, the community has ten total members: three priests and seven brothers in formation.

== Promises, prayer and apostolates ==
Members of the Servants take promises to the Evangelical Counsels of poverty, chastity, and obedience, as do most Catholic religious orders and communities. A special focus is given to evangelical poverty, with each member of the community only having 2 or 3 sets of clothes, the community abstaining from meat on Wednesdays and only consuming bread and water on Fridays, and each Servant making a month-long poverty pilgrimage with only a change of clothes and a Bible.

A life of common prayer is central to the spirituality of the Servants—Daily Mass and a Holy Hour, along with common recitation of the Liturgy of the Hours, weekly Confession, and yearly Spiritual Exercises of Ignatius of Loyola are observed by the whole community, the community states.

They are involved in various apostolates, including high school and college campus ministry, youth apostolates such as Catholic Youth Summer Camp and LifeTeen, family ministry through the men's Patriarch program, as chaplains to groups such as the Augustine Institute, University of Denver, and United States Naval Academy as well as the core missions of preaching, teaching, and spiritual direction.
