= Basilica of St. Mary of the Assumption (Marietta, Ohio) =

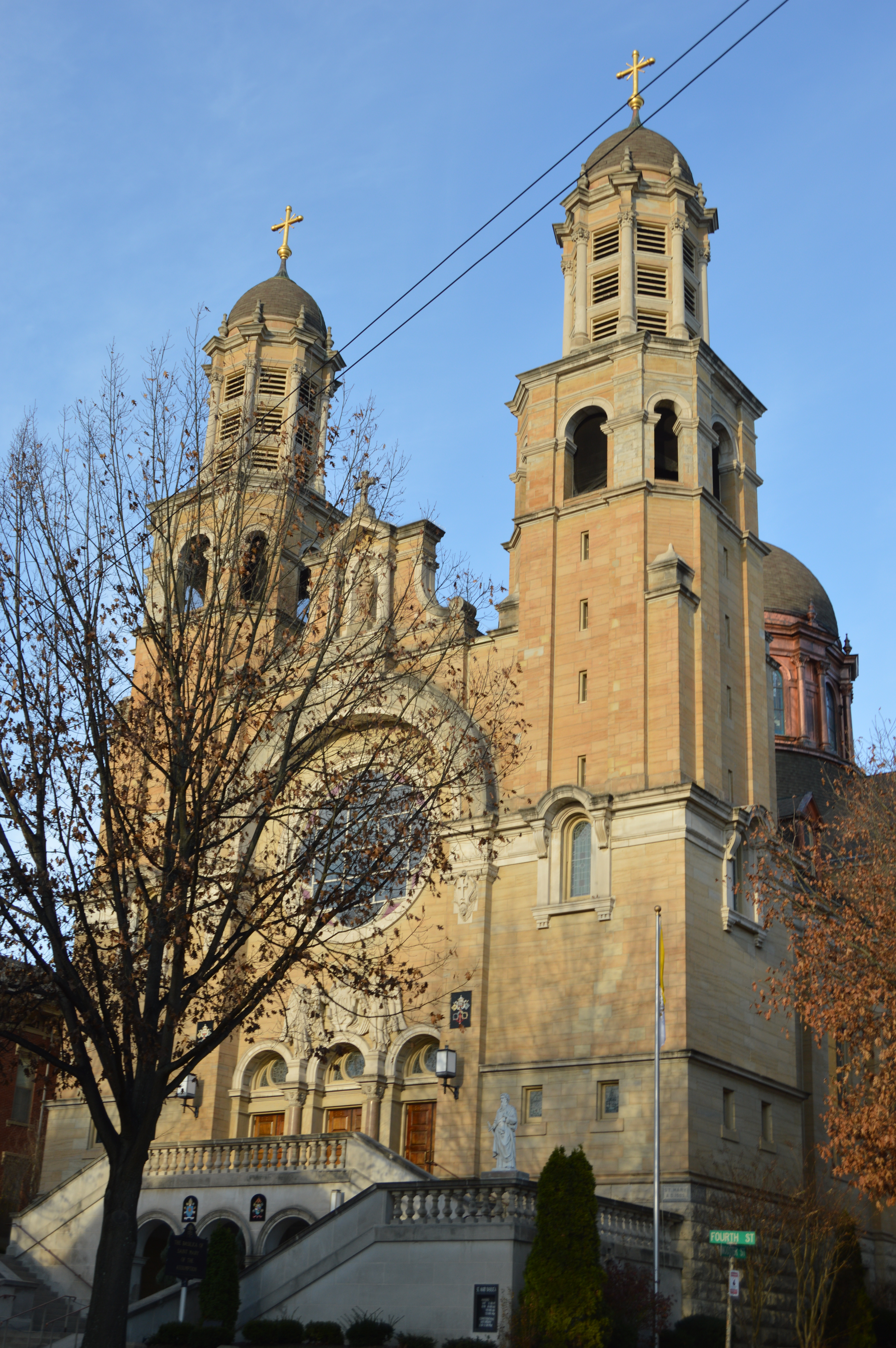
- Front of the basilica

- Location in Ohio
- 39°25′17″N 81°27′21″W
- Location: 506 4th St. Marietta, Ohio
- Country: United States
- Denomination: Roman Catholic Church
- Website: stmarysmarietta.org

History
- Founded: 1838
- Consecrated: December 12, 1909

Architecture
- Architect: Emile M. Uhlrich
- Style: Spanish Colonial Revival
- Groundbreaking: July 1, 1903
- Completed: 1909
- Construction cost: $129,000

Administration
- Diocese: Steubenville

Clergy
- Bishop: Most Rev. Jeffrey M. Monforton
- Pastor: Msgr. John M. Campbell

The Basilica of St. Mary of the Assumption is a Minor Basilica of the Catholic Church located in Marietta, Ohio, United States. It is also a parish church of the Diocese of Steubenville.

== History ==
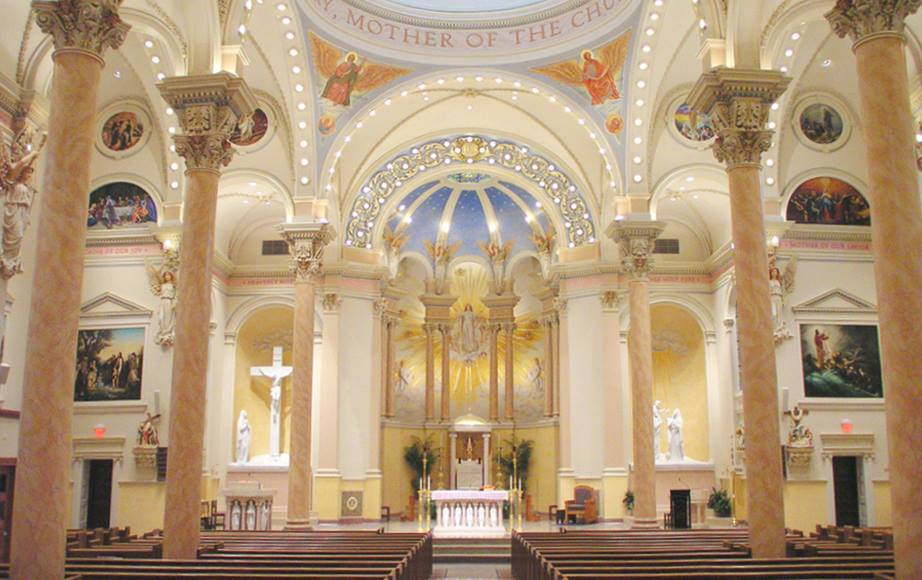
Interior

The first Mass celebrated in what is now Marietta was celebrated by the Rev. Joseph de Bonnecamp, S.J. who was the chaplain to a French expedition from Quebec. The Mass was celebrated at the confluence of the Muskingum and Ohio Rivers. There were few Catholics in the early years of the town. By the 1830s a priest would occasionally visit from Wheeling. Bishop John B. Purcell of the Diocese of Cincinnati bought land in Marietta in 1837 and sent a resident priest the following year to establish the parish. A building on the property was used by the parish for worship until 1853 when the first church building was built. The building was inundated by floods in 1884, 1891, 1895 and 1898.

The property for the present church was acquired in 1900 after the 1,000-member parish determined it needed to move to higher ground. The house on the site was moved to the north side of the property and is still in use as the rectory. Cleveland architect Emile M. Uhlrich designed the church in the Spanish Colonial Revival style. The ground was broken on July 1, 1903, and Bishop James J. Hartley of the Diocese of Columbus, which St. Mary's became a part of in 1868, laid the cornerstone on June 12, 1904. The building was enclosed in 1905 and work halted until 1907 while subscriptions were paid off and new funds were raised. The church was consecrated by Bishop Hartley on December 12, 1909. The stained glass windows were created in Munich, Germany.

In 1945 St. Mary's transferred to the newly established Diocese of Steubenville. Pope Francis decreed on June 13, 2013, that St. Mary's Church was elevated to the status of a minor basilica. It was solemnized by Bishop Jeffrey M. Monforton on November 5, 2013.
