= Kunjana Parashar =

Indian poet

- Occupations: Poet, Editor
- Writing career
- Language: English
- Years active: 2019–Present
- Website: kunjanaparashar.com

Kunjana Parashar is an Indian poet based in Mumbai, and was an associate editor at Bombay Literary Magazine. Her debut collection They Gather Around Me, the Animals was selected by Diane Suess as the winner of Barbara Stevens Poetry Book Award 2024.

== Career ==
Parashar's poems first appeared in various literary magazines in 2019, and her poetry since has been featured in Poetry Northwest, The Adroit Journal, Singapore Unbound, Sixth Finch, amongst others. In 2025, alongside fellow writers Kinjal Sethia and Yashasvi Vachhani, Parashar co-founded the Osmosis Poetry Prize, aimed at celebrating emerging Indian poets in English language.

Her first collection They Gather Around Me, the Animals was published in 2025 by NFSPS Press. One of her poems, titled 'A Poem With No Birds in it', was read by the English actor Sean Bean for the UK program Get Birding.

=== Reception ===
Before joining Bombay Literary Magazine as an editor, Parashar's poetic voice was described in the publication by the poet Pervin Saket as "fascinating", "novel" and "poised to captivate the ‘larger reading public’".

American poet Diane Seuss praised the evolution of form in her debut collection, ranging "from the devotional to the surreal, from contrapuntal to pantoum ... written in both the presence and the absence of the animals ... in a diction which opens the lexicon to the language of the ecological imagination." Writing about the collection for Outlook, poet Aranya Padil called Parashar's vision as "more-than-human ... deepening the anthropocentric gaze, even as it embraces sensitivity while engaging with the creatures and life-forms [in] our lived environment". Critics frequently highlighted the collection's ecological themes and its exploratory relationship with the human and the natural world.

== Awards ==
- 2021: Toto Funds Art Award
- 2021: Deepankar Khiwani Memorial Prize
- 2024: Barbara Stevens Poetry Book Award
