= Sean Lam =

Singaporean author and artist

- Born: Singapore
- Occupations: Author, artist
- Writing career
- Notable works: It Takes a Wizard; Ringworld, The Graphic Novel; Pope Francis: I believe in Mercy; Habemus Papam-Pope Benedict XVI

Sean Lam is a Singaporean author and artist. He is best known for his two part graphic novel adaption of New York Times bestselling Larry Niven's sci-fi novel Ringworld and a 32-page Pope Benedict manga comic where 300,000 copies were distributed for World Youth Day 2011 in Madrid. He is also the creator of the graphic novel Geungsi.

== Early life and education ==
Lam was born in Singapore. As a young adolescent, he was fascinated with drawing. In the 1980s, he was exposed to varied art from a diverse range of graphic novels, ranging from Western comics to Japanese manga and Chinese manhua, which led him to develop a strong interest in this form of art and storytelling. He graduated from the Nanyang Academy of Fine Arts (NAFA) and specialized in traditional and digital art, graphic novel and story writing. Aside from his art career, he is also known to be an avid mixed martial arts and Tai Chi practitioner.

== Graphic novel career ==
=== Early 2009-2014, early work and breakthrough ===
Lam's first foray into the comic industry was It Takes a Wizard, a 480-page single volume manga, written by German writer Thomas R. Hart, and published by Seven Seas Entertainment, an American publisher of original manga-style comics in 2009. Two years later, Macmillan Publishers published his two-part graphic novel adaption of the sci-fi novel Ringworld by Larry Niven, namely Ringworld: The Graphic Novel, Part One and Ringworld: The Graphic Novel, Part Two.

In an interview in 2011, Lam talked about his hopes to bring changes to the art scene in Singapore and to attract and trigger children's creativity through comic and manga art, saying “Young children are usually fascinated by the art when they pick up the book. I hope that my artwork can help them understand the emotional background of the setting and characters, and bring them into that world to learn about the wonderful stories of faith and goodwill.”

He then went on to develop several bible-themed graphic novels with American publisher Manga Hero, which includes Paul: Tarsus to Redemption, Judith: Captive to Conqueror, Many Are Called, and Habemus Papam! manga. He released a 32-page Pope Benedict manga comic which was distributed in August during World Youth Day 2011 in Madrid. This was followed by an expanded version of the graphic novel which went deeper into the life of Pope Benedict XVI. In 2012 he won an award for Judith: Captive to Conqueror at the Angoulême Christian Comics Festival in France. A 48-page paperback, Pope Francis: I Believe in Mercy, was later created to celebrate the appointment of Pope Francis.

=== 2015–2019 ===
In 2015, he collaborated with the Four Lords from San Diego as the main comic artist for The Curseborn Saga manga, and together held a book signing at the Los Angeles Anime Expo for the launch of the first volume, followed by another at San Diego Comic-Con in 2018, where his team got an exclusive interview by ABC 10 News. They are currently in works on the second volume of the comic and an art book with a consolidation of all his current concept arts and character designs for the story planned for release sometimes towards end of 2018 or early 2019.

=== 2020 to present ===
Throughout the 20s to present, Lam worked closely with his chief editor Junzi (also known as kingB, a contemporary artist and author ) over many past works, including his two new original comic series namely the Red Dot(later renamed Geungsi) and Goddess Punch, both which were introduced exclusively on his social media platform Instagram. Both works aim to appeal to both local Singaporeans as well as the international audience. Apart from working on graphic novels, Sean has held in-house art gallery showcasing his popular online series of Red Dot and Silent Night series artworks which he has also shared on his Instagram.

During the COVID-19 pandemic in Singapore, he started art therapies and free art workshops for children sharing his latest children's illustrated storybook series Growing Up with you, a series of heart-warming local stories.

In December 2020 he was commissioned by Nanyang Academy of Fine Arts (NAFA) and REACH to produce a mural to celebrate REACH Singapore 35th Anniversary, to show support to their 35 years of relentless efforts to hear the voices of the public as well as engaging in conversations with all walks of life. The mural aims to start off on an emerging stronger conversation to reach out to different communities in Singapore such as clan associations and youths, to enable participants to share their hopes for what Singapore could look like as the country emerge from COVID-19.

In early 2021, in a NAFA news article, he shared more updates of his new long running graphic novel series Geungsi, which was slated to be launched later part of the year and also the first time his book is launched in Singapore ahead of its international release. In June 2021, he shared with Asia Contemporary Art platform Artitute some insights of his journey in pursuing his passion as a graphic novelist, and how he came about with the creation of Geungsi being his first written story that sets in Singapore, where he blends social commentary and detailed cultural settings with strong elements of Asian horror, myth and fantasy. American online publishing platform Medium followed up with an article on the book ahead of its launch in Sep, with sneak previews of the book production and a take on his new approach in the art style of Geungsi. In Oct 2021 he officially held a three day launch of his book Geungsi at the Singapore National Library in Singapore with a series of talks where he shares about writing and creating graphic novels. During the talks, he revealed that Geungsi is going to be a long running series with the apocalyptic story spanning across Asia to other parts of the world. He held a solo exhibition called Geungsi Art Exhibition 2021 in November to celebrate the launch of his first work in Singapore and was featured in Singapore's arts and culture guide Alist.

In an interview with pop-culture Red Dot Diva on his Geungsi, he shared about how the title Geungsi derived from his love for Jiangshi films back in the 90s. He also quoted inspirations from music in the course of his work whenever he's drawing. In Jan 2022 he did an exclusive interview with The Singapore Straits Times and had Geungsi featured in The Sunday Times line up of hot-off-the-press home-grown books in Singapore.

Adam Symchuk of The Grimoire of Horror and Asian Movie Pulse gave the book 4 out of 5 and praised the series being perfectly poised, which touches on a few different genres in an impressive manner and deserved, to bring further recognition to the region – particularly for fans of horror manga. New York City-based literary arts Singapore Unbound puts Geungsi as one of the must-read books in SP Blog’s 8th Annual Books Round-up 2021.

In Jan 2022 Yuan magazine of Singapore Federation of Chinese Clan Associations released a full length Chinese interview on him, for the first time sharing deeper insights about his thoughts and life journey through the years abroad in pursue of his passion in graphic novel career.

== Technique and materials ==
Sean is known to use Japanese nib G-pen and Sumi Ink over his pencils for his graphic novel works, and is also versed in using Wacom graphics tablets. He also specializes in using charcoal on large canvas and Chinese and Japanese ink wash painting.

In talking about the artist's work ethic, Sean has said, "I hope artists strike a balance in using traditional and digital medium. When one uses traditional art medium, they gain a deeper understanding of the materials and fundamentals as opposed to the over-reliance on undoing mistakes using digital, which on the other hand, do offer an increase in productivity on time.

== Music and fashion ==
In early 2018 he collaborated with American DJ and record producer Slushii with an anime rendition of him on a limited edition poster of his There X2 Tour, for the first time introducing Slushii clashing with new 'dark Slushii' donned in a black alternate version of his signature T-shirt.

In 2020 he collaborated with Japanese brand Maker's Watch Knot to launch a Limited time collection series of the 12 Zodiac Characters artworks together with their Artisan Watches, with each pair of Zodiac inspired male and female characters featured monthly. ‘Knot X SEANLAM Limited Postcard Collection’ consists of character designs which are loosely based on one of his manga story collections 'Moment For Love 愛の瞬間 ‘. Through this collaboration, he expresses that "art is a timeless expression that bonds together the love and people of diversity". He was also the judge for the manga art competition held by Knot in Singapore in April 2020.

In Dec 2021, Sean launched THE YUREI X SEANLAM, a clothing line featuring his new series of artworks introducing a collection of mythical creatures from Asian folklore beyond those of Japanese folklore to the west. This marks his first collaboration with the UK Asian Horror media The Yurei and their collaboration was featured on Arttitute. The clothing line was launched on the same day in UK and Singapore under UK time zone. THE YUREI X SEANLAM made a first appearance at the SG Toycon 2021 in Singapore where Sean held an exclusive three day autograph session for the launch of the first series of the limited edition T-shirts and bandannas.

== Awards ==
- 2012 Angoulême Christian Comics Festival 2nd award for Judith: Captive to Conqueror

== Publications ==
- Pope Francis: I Believe in Mercy (Manga Hero, 2017) ISBN 978-0983639794
- Many Are Called (Manga Hero, 2017) ISBN 978-0997440522
- Habemus Papam-Pope Benedict XVI (Manga Hero, 2017) ISBN 978-0983639756
- Ringworld: The Graphic Novel, Part Two (Tor/Seven Seas, 2015) ISBN 978-0765324634
- Ringworld: The Graphic Novel, Part One (Tor/Seven Seas, 2014) ISBN 978-0765324627
- Judith: Captive to Conqueror (Manga Hero, 2013) ISBN 978-0983639763
- Paul: Tarsus to Redemption (Manga Hero, 2012) ISBN 978-0983639749
- It Takes a Wizard (Seven Seas, 2009) ISBN 978-1934876343
- Geungsi (Sean Lam, 2021) ISBN 978-9811489754
