= Geungsi =

Graphic novel series

- Editor: Junzi
- Author: Sean Lam
- Language: English
- Genre: Adventure, supernatural comedy, martial arts
- Published: 2021
- Media type: Print (hardcover, paperback)
- ISBN: 978-9811489754

Geungsi (Chinese: jiangshi 僵尸) is a graphic novel series written and illustrated by Sean Lam, who is best known for his two-part graphic novel adaptation of New York Times bestselling Larry Niven's sci-fi novel Ringworld and Pope Benedict manga. Junzi (also known as kingB, a contemporary artist and author) is the chief editor for the book.

Geungsi is considered to be Singapore's very first local graphic novel drawn in the form of Shōnen manga style, characterized by the high action and humorous plots featuring protagonists easily relatable to the young adults. The apocalyptic series sets in Singapore and spans across Asia to other parts of the world, following the story of a protagonist named Shaun who uncovered the world of an ancient clan of slayers who has over the centuries protected mankind from an undead called Geungsi.

Geungsi Art Exhibition and book launch was held at the Singapore National Library in Oct and Nov 2021. Geungsi was featured in the Singapore Straits Times line up of hot-off-the-press home-grown books in Singapore along with an interview of Sean Lam.

== Characters ==
=== Major characters ===
Shaun (肖恩)

Meng (明)

Alice (爱丽丝)

== Reception ==
Adam Symchuk of The Grimoire of Horror and Asian Movie Pulse gave the book 4 out of 5 and praised the series being perfectly poised, which touches on a few different genres in an impressive manner and deserved, to bring further recognition to the region – particularly for fans of horror manga. New York City-based literary arts Singapore Unbound puts Geungsi as one of the must-read books in SP Blog's 8th Annual Books Round-up 2021.
