= Anthony John King Mussio =

Roman Catholic bishop from Ohio

His Excellency, The Most Reverend Anthony John King Mussio
- Bishop of Steubenville
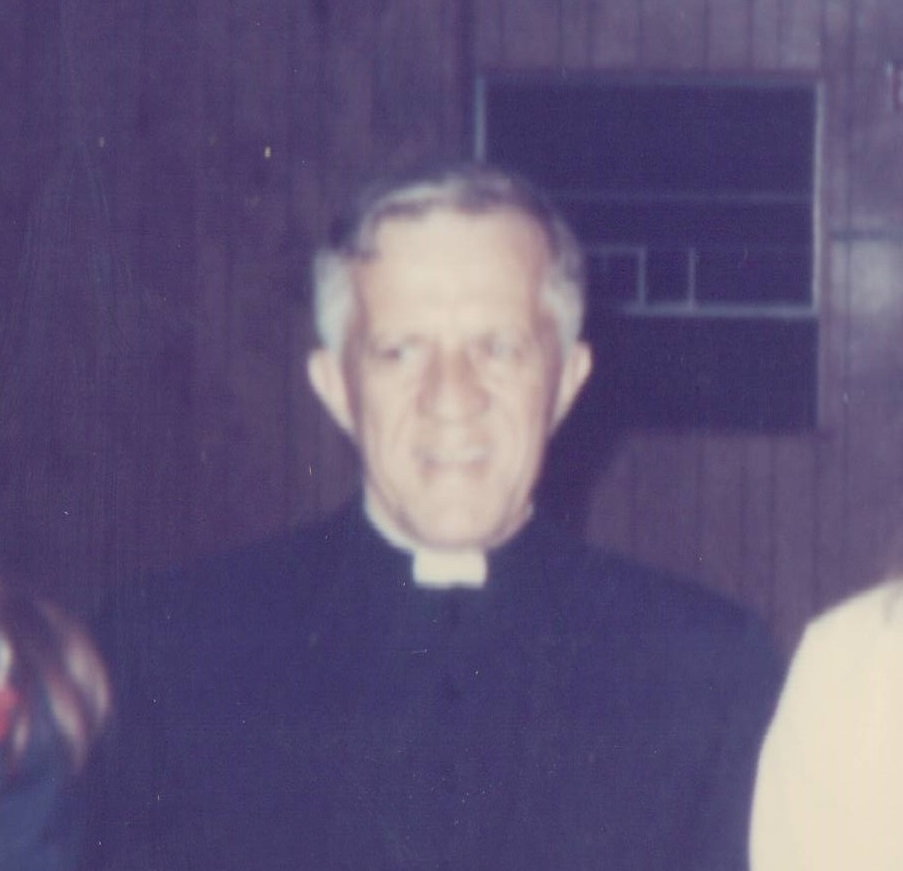
- Bishop Mussio in 1973
- Church: Roman Catholic
- See: Diocese of Steubenville
- In office: May 23, 1945; September 27, 1977
- Successor: Albert Henry Ottenweller

Orders
- Ordination: August 15, 1935 by John T. McNicholas
- Consecration: March 10, 1945 by John T. McNicholas

Personal details
- Born: June 13, 1902 Cincinnati, Ohio, USA
- Died: April 15, 1978 (aged 75)
- Denomination: Roman Catholic
- Education: Xavier University; University of Notre Dame; University of Cincinnati; Mount St. Mary's Seminary; Pontifical University of Saint Thomas Aquinas
- Motto: Caritas urget nos (Charity urges us)

Anthony John King Mussio (June 13, 1902 – April 15, 1978) was an American prelate of the Roman Catholic Church. He served as the first bishop of the Diocese of Steubenville in Ohio from 1945 to 1977.

== Biography ==
=== Early life ===
John Mussio was born on June 13, 1902, in Cincinnati, Ohio, to John Edward and Blanche (née King) Mussio. He attended Assumption Elementary School and St. Xavier High School, both in Cincinnati. He entered Xavier University in 1920, obtaining a Bachelor of Arts degree in 1924. Mussio earned a Master of Arts degree from the University of Notre Dame, then returned to Cincinnati to study at the University of Cincinnati College-Conservatory of Music.

Mussio taught English at Xavier University from 1925 to 1930 while also studying law at the University of Cincinnati. After deciding to become a priest, Mussio entered St. Gregory Preparatory Seminary in 1930. He then attended Mount St. Mary's Seminary in Cincinnati, starting in 1932.

=== Priesthood ===
Mussio was ordained to the priesthood for the Archdiocese of Cincinnati by Archbishop John T. McNicholas on August 15, 1935. Mussio then traveled to Rome to study at the Pontifical University of Saint Thomas Aquinas. He earned a doctorate in canon law in 1939 with a dissertation entitled "The Education of Offspring : a Primary End of Matrimony"

Following his return to Cincinnati in 1939, Mussio was appointed as assistant chancellor of the archdiocese. He was named chancellor and a papal chamberlain in 1942. In addition to his other duties, Mussio taught canon law at Mount St. Mary's Seminary.

=== Bishop of Steubenville ===
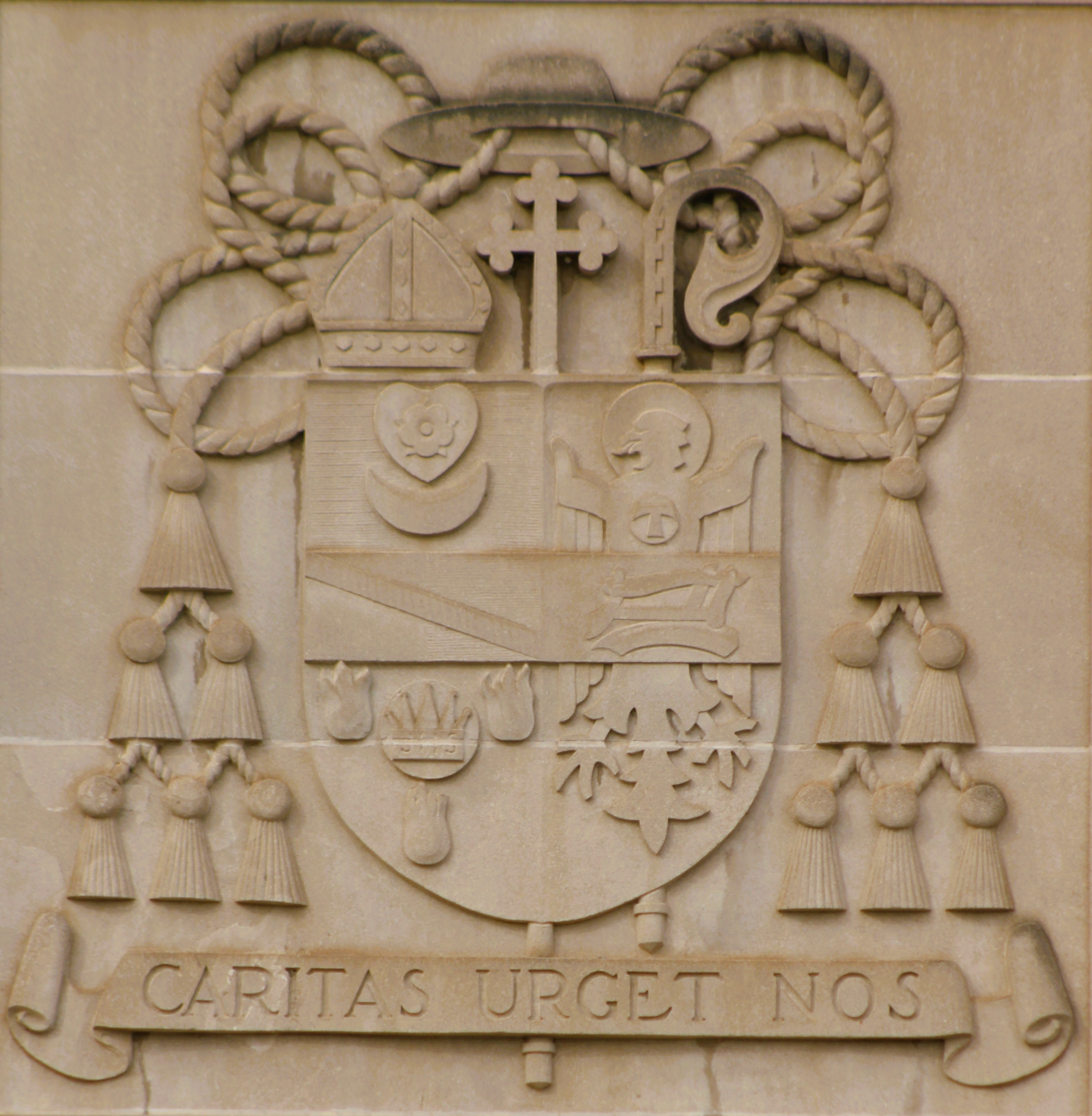
Bishop Mussio's coat of arms on the facade of Holy Name Cathedral in Steubenville (2023)

On March 10, 1945, Mussio was appointed the first bishop of the newly erected Diocese of Steubenville by Pope Pius XII. He received his episcopal consecration on May 1, 1945, from Archbishop McNicholas, with Bishops Michael Ready and George Rehring serving as co-consecrators, at St. Monica's Pro-Cathedral. He was installed at Holy Name Cathedral in Steubenville on May 23, 1945. In 1958, Mussio joined with the other Catholic bishops of Ohio in opposing a so-called right to work amendment to the Ohio Constitution that would have outlawed mandatory union membership in unionized workplaces.

As bishop, Mussio established 73 parishes and 20 missions, the College of Steubenville in Steubenville, St. John Vianney Seminary, a Camaldolese hermitage, Samaritan House, Catholic Social Services, and St. John's Villa. He also founded the diocesan newspaper, The Steubenville Register. Mussio was appointed an assistant at the pontifical throne on June 8, 1960. In a 1960 article in the publication Ave Maria from the University of Notre Dame, Mussio said that existing parish structures were outdated and cumbersome. He believed that lay people needed to relieve priests of administrative roles in their parishes so that the priests could spend more time evangelizing and ministering to parishioners.

Between 1962 and 1965, Mussio attended all four sessions of the Second Vatican Council in Rome. In accord with the Council's reforms, he established the Steubenville Ecumenical Institute to foster better relationships among Christians and Jews. He also served as a member of the Episcopal Commission of the National Legion of Decency and as episcopal moderator of the Catholic Broadcasters Association.

=== Retirement and legacy ===
After reaching the mandatory retirement age of 75, Mussio submitted his resignation as bishop of the Diocese of Steubenville to the pope. It was accepted by Pope Paul VI on September 27, 1977.

John Mussio died on April 15, 1978. Bishop John King Mussio Central Elementary School and Bishop John King Mussio Junior High School, both in Steubenville, are named after him.

Catholic Church titles
Preceded by none	Bishop of Steubenville; 1945—1977	Succeeded by Albert Henry Ottenweller
