= Gilbert Sheldon (bishop of Steubenville) =

American prelate of the Catholic Church (1926–2023)

His Excellency, The Most Reverend Gilbert Ignatius Sheldon
- Bishop of Steubenville
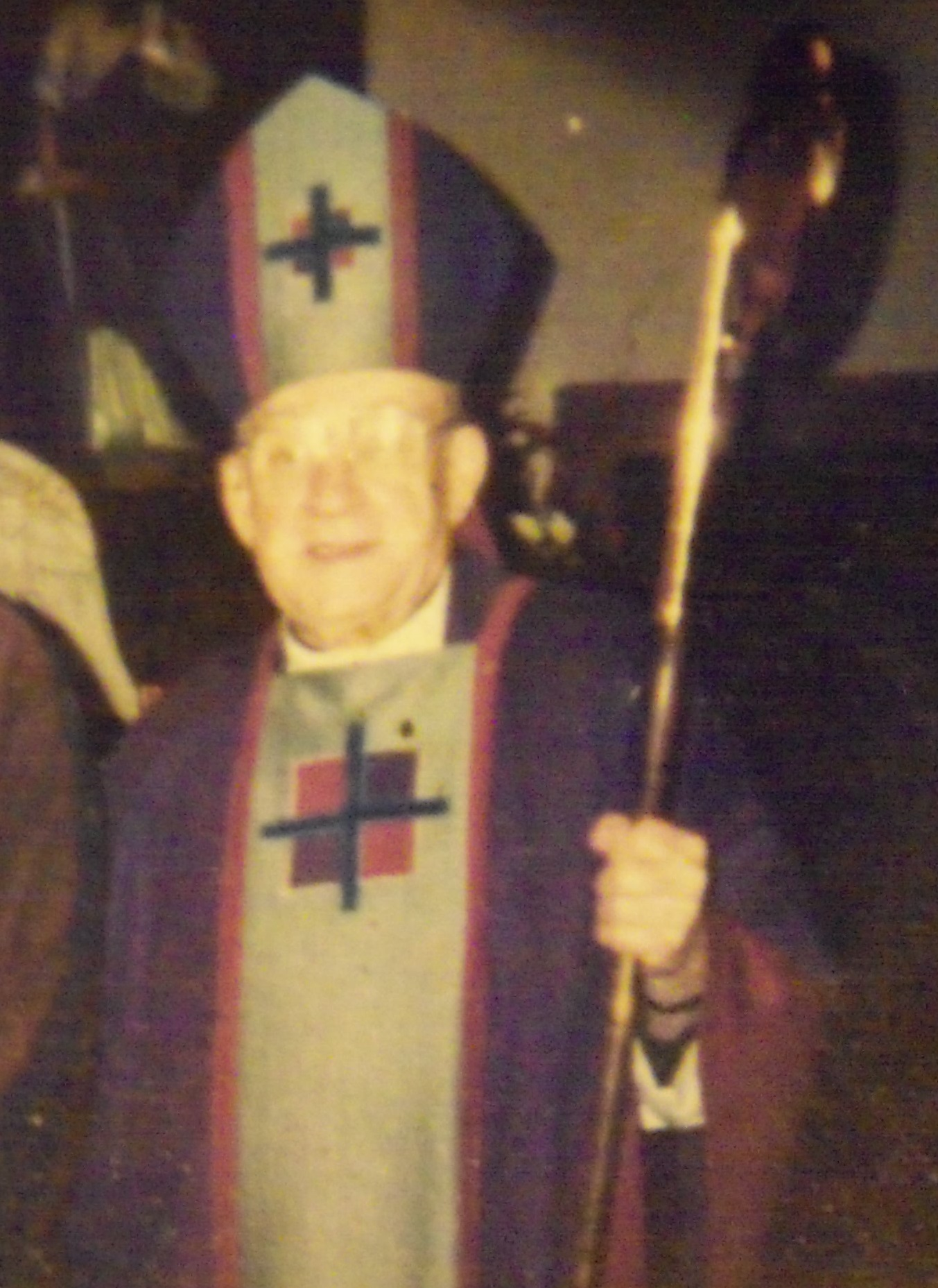
- Bishop Sheldon in 1998
- Diocese: Diocese of Steubenville
- Appointed: January 28, 1992
- Installed: April 2, 1992
- Term ended: May 31, 2002
- Predecessor: Albert Henry Ottenweller
- Successor: Robert Daniel Conlon
- Previous post: Auxiliary Bishop of Cleveland and Titular Bishop of Taparura (1976–1992)

Orders
- Ordination: February 28, 1953 by Edward Francis Hoban
- Consecration: June 11, 1976 by James Aloysius Hickey, Joseph Bernardin, and Clarence George Issenmann

Personal details
- Born: September 20, 1926 Cleveland, Ohio, U.S.
- Died: April 24, 2023 (aged 96)
- Motto: Fortes in fide (Strong in faith)

Styles of Gilbert Ignatius Sheldon
- Reference style: His Excellency; The Most Reverend
- Spoken style: Your Excellency
- Religious style: Bishop

Gilbert Ignatius Sheldon (September 20, 1926 – April 24, 2023) was an American prelate of the Roman Catholic Church. He served as the third bishop of the Diocese of Steubenville in Ohio between 1992 and 2002. Sheldon previously served as an auxiliary bishop of the Diocese of Cleveland in Ohio from 1976 to 1992.

== Biography ==
=== Early life ===
Sheldon was born on September 20, 1926, in Cleveland, Ohio, one of 12 children of Ignatius Peter and Stephania Josephine (née Olszewski) Solinski-Sheldon. He received his early education at the parochial school of St. Phillip Neri Parish, and then attended Cathedral Latin High School In Chardon, Ohio.

Sheldon studied at John Carroll University in University Heights, Ohio, before beginning his studies for the priesthood at Saint Mary Seminary and Graduate School of Theology in Wickliffe, Ohio. He earned a Master of Divinity degree from Saint Mary. Sheldon also received a Doctor of Ministry degree from the Ohio Consortium of Seminaries.

=== Priesthood ===
On February 28, 1953, Sheldon was ordained a priest for the Archdiocese of Cleveland by Archbishop Edward F. Hoban. After this ordination, between 1953 and 1964, Sheldon served as an associate pastor at St. Rose's Parish in Cleveland, St. Clare's Parish in Lyndhurst, Ohio, and Saints Philip and James Parish in Cleveland. Sheldon served as diocesan director of the Society for the Propagation of the Faith from 1964 to 1974.

From 1974 to 1976, Sheldon served as pastor of Sacred Heart Parish in Oberlin, Ohio and episcopal vicar of Lorain Count, Ohio. He also served as chaplain at Magnificat High School In Rocky River, Ohio, and of the West Park Knights of Columbus. Sheldon was a notary and prosynodal judge for the diocesan tribunal, instructor at St. John's College in Cleveland and a board member for St. Mary's Seminary and for Borromeo College in Wickliffe, Ohio.

=== Auxiliary Bishop of Cleveland ===
On April 12, 1976, Pope Paul VI appointed Sheldon as an auxiliary bishop of Cleveland and titular bishop of Taparura. He was consecrated at the Cathedral of Saint John the Evangelist in Cleveland on June 11 1976, by Bishop James A. Hickey, with then Archbishop Joseph Bernardin and Bishop Clarence G. Issenmann serving as co-consecrators. As an auxiliary bishop, Sheldon was named vicar for marriage and family concerns (1976) and vicar of Summit County (1978). In 1979, he became vicar of the Southern Region of the diocese, including Summit, Medina, Wayne, and Ashland Counties.

Sheldon was director of missions when the archdiocese sponsored a mission in El Salvador, then in the midst of an insurgency. On December 2, 1980, five members of the Salvadoran National Guard abducted, raped, and killed four American female missionaries in El Salvador. Two of the victims, Sister Dorothy Kazel and lay missionary Jean Donovan, came from the Archdiocese of Cleveland.

Sheldon faced public controversy in 1984 when he asserted authority over the Bread of Life Community, a religious group that was accused of cult-like practices. After an investigation, he chastised the group for unequal treatment of female members and for its doctrines; the group's official ecclesiastical authorization was withdrawn in 1985.

=== Bishop of Steubenville ===
On January 28, 1992, Sheldon was appointed bishop of Steubenville by Pope John Paul II. As bishop, he presided over the newest and most sparsely populated of Ohio's six Catholic dioceses.

=== Retirement and death ===
After reaching the mandatory retirement age of 75, Sheldon sent his letter of resignation as bishop of Steubenville to John Paul II. His resignation was accepted by the pope on May 31, 2002. Sheldon was succeeded by Reverend Robert Conlon, a priest of the Archdiocese of Cincinnati. Sheldon died on April 24, 2023, at the age of 96.

== See also ==
- Catholic Church hierarchy
- Catholic Church in the United States
- Historical list of the Catholic bishops of the United States
- List of Catholic bishops of the United States
- Lists of patriarchs, archbishops, and bishops

== Episcopal succession ==
Catholic Church titles
Preceded by Albert Henry Ottenweller	Bishop of Steubenville; 1992–2002	Succeeded by Robert Daniel Conlon
Preceded by Mark Kenny Carroll	Auxiliary Bishop of Taparura; 1976–1992	Succeeded by Pietro Gabrielli
Preceded by —	Auxiliary Bishop of Cleveland; 1976–1992	Succeeded by —
