= Ferenc Cserháti =

Hungarian Catholic bishop (1947–2023)

His Excellency Ferenc Cserháti
- Auxiliary Bishop Emeritus of Esztergom–Budapest
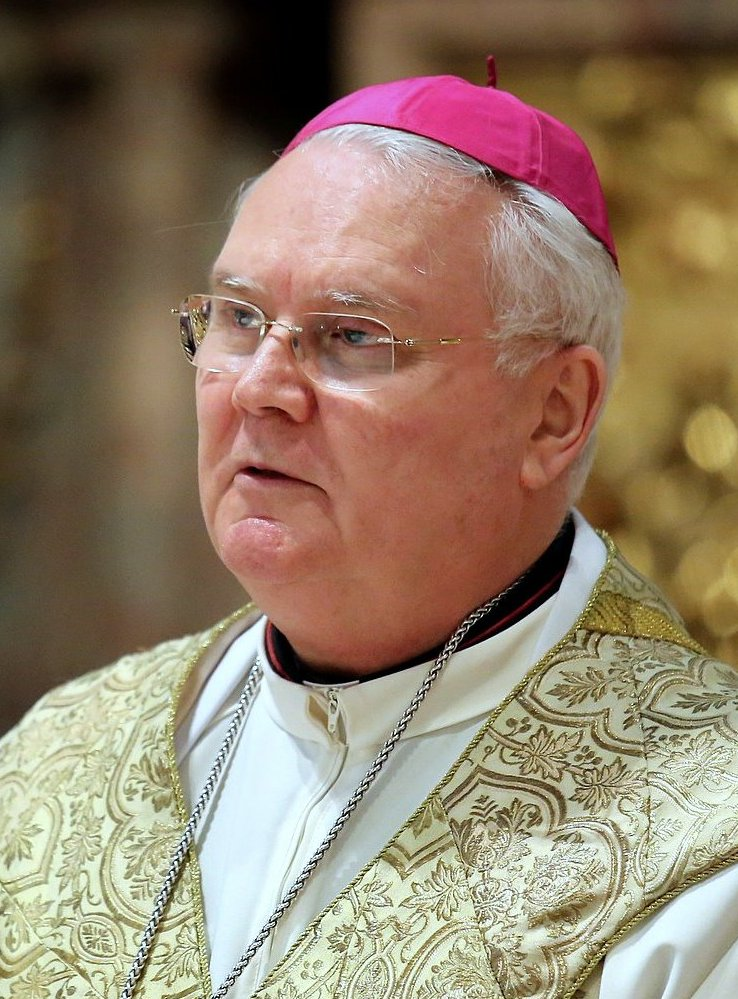
- Appointed: 15 June 2007
- Term ended: 3 February 2023
- Other post: Titular Bishop of Centuria (2007–2023)

Orders
- Ordination: 18 April 1971 by Áron Márton
- Consecration: 15 August 2007 by Péter Erdő

Personal details
- Born: 12 February 1947 Turulung, Romania
- Died: 22 July 2023 (aged 76)

Ferenc Cserháti (12 February 1947 – 22 July 2023) was a Hungarian Roman Catholic prelate. He was auxiliary bishop of Esztergom–Budapest from 2007 to 2023.

Cserháti died on 22 July 2023, at the age of 76.

Catholic Church titles
Preceded by —	Auxiliary Bishop of Esztergom–Budapest; 2007–2023	Succeeded by —
Preceded by Piotr Libera	Titular Bishop of Centuria; 2007–2023	Succeeded by Vacant
