= Lawrence Ypil =

Filipino writer

Lawrence Lacambra Ypil is a poet and nonfiction writer from Cebu, Philippines. Ypil is currently an Assistant Professor at the University of Hawai’i at Manoa and was a Senior Lecturer at Yale-NUS.

He earned his first Masters of Fine Arts in Creative Writing (Poetry) while on a Fulbright fellowship at Washington University in St Louis, and another MFA in Non-Fiction Writing from the Iowa Writers' Workshop.

The Highest Hiding Place: Poems won the 2011 Madrigal-Gonzalez First Book Award and was a finalist for the Gintong Aklat Awards in 2010.

Ypil's second book, The Experiment of the Tropics was the co-winner of the 1st Gaudy Boy Poetry Book Prize (with Jenifer Sang Eun Park's Autobiography of A Horse: A Poem). It was also a finalist for the Lambda Literary Awards in Gay Poetry and on the Editor's Long List for The Believer Book Awards in 2019. The book examines archival photographs of Ypil's hometown, Cebu, during the American Period. Ypil describes the process of writing this book as revealing both historical place and himself: "By looking at the photographs, I ended up looking through them, and eventually discovered myself. It felt like looking at beautiful, deep, dark mirrors."

== Books ==
- The Highest Hiding Place: Poems (2009)
- The Experiment of the Tropics: Poems ISBN 978-0982814253 (2019)

== Critical reception ==
A review in Singapore Unbound says: "The Experiment of the Tropics is a meditation on the nature of cities, the revelatory power of photography, and the startling capacity of poetry to cut into the violent but redemptive parts of history."
