= Jenifer Sang Eun Park =

Korean American author

Jenifer Sang Eun Park is a Korean American author. Originally from Denver, CO, she currently lives in Tuscaloosa, AL where she is an instructor at the University of Alabama. She earned her MFA in creative writing at the University of Alabama and her BAs in Communication Studies and English at the University of Colorado at Denver.

Her debut poetry collection, Autobiography of Horse: A Poem, was selected by Wong May as a co-winner of The Gaudy Boy Poetry Book Prize in 2018 (with Lawrence Ypil) and published by Gaudy Boy the following year. The book is difficult to categorize; the Rumpus describes it as "a single hybrid work composed of historical anecdotes, monologue, dialog, lists, diagrams, photographs, collage, and prose, embedded seamlessly into the writer’s relationship with myriad things we associate with horses." It was also a Staff Pick at the Paris Review.

Park also has a chapbook, When the Horse Lights the Night, with Essay Press.

== Books ==
- Autobiography of Horse: A Poem (2019)
