= Centuria (Numidia) =

Centuria, also known as Centuriensis, was a Roman era town in Numidia, Roman province of Africa. It has been tentatively identified with ruins near Ain El Hadjar in Algeria, south of Saida.

== Bishopric ==
The city was the seat of an ancient bishopric and the current bishop is Jeffrey M. Monforton. Known bishops of the town include:

- Quodvultdeus (fl. 402–411) (Catholic bishop attended the Council of Milevum (402) and Council of Carthage (411)
- Cresconio fl. 411) (rival Donatist)
- Gennaro fl.484
- Luis Camargo Pacheco (1622–1665)
- Johann Kaspar Kühner (1664–1685)
- Andrew Giffard (1705 Appointed – Did not take office)
- John Douglass (1790–1812)
- Myles Prendergast (1818–1844)
- Antonio Majthényi (1840–1856)
- St. Valentín Faustino Berrio Ochoa, (1857–1861)
- Thomas McNulty (1864–1866)
- Bonifacio Antonio Toscano (1874–1896)
- Giuseppe Perrachon (1925–1944)
- Stanislao Czajka (1944–1965)
- William Joseph Moran (1965–1996)
- Piotr Libera (1996–2007)
- Ferenc Cserháti (2007–2023)
- Jeffrey M. Monforton (2023–present)
