= Jee Leong Koh =

Poet, publisher, and the founder/organizer of Singapore Unbound

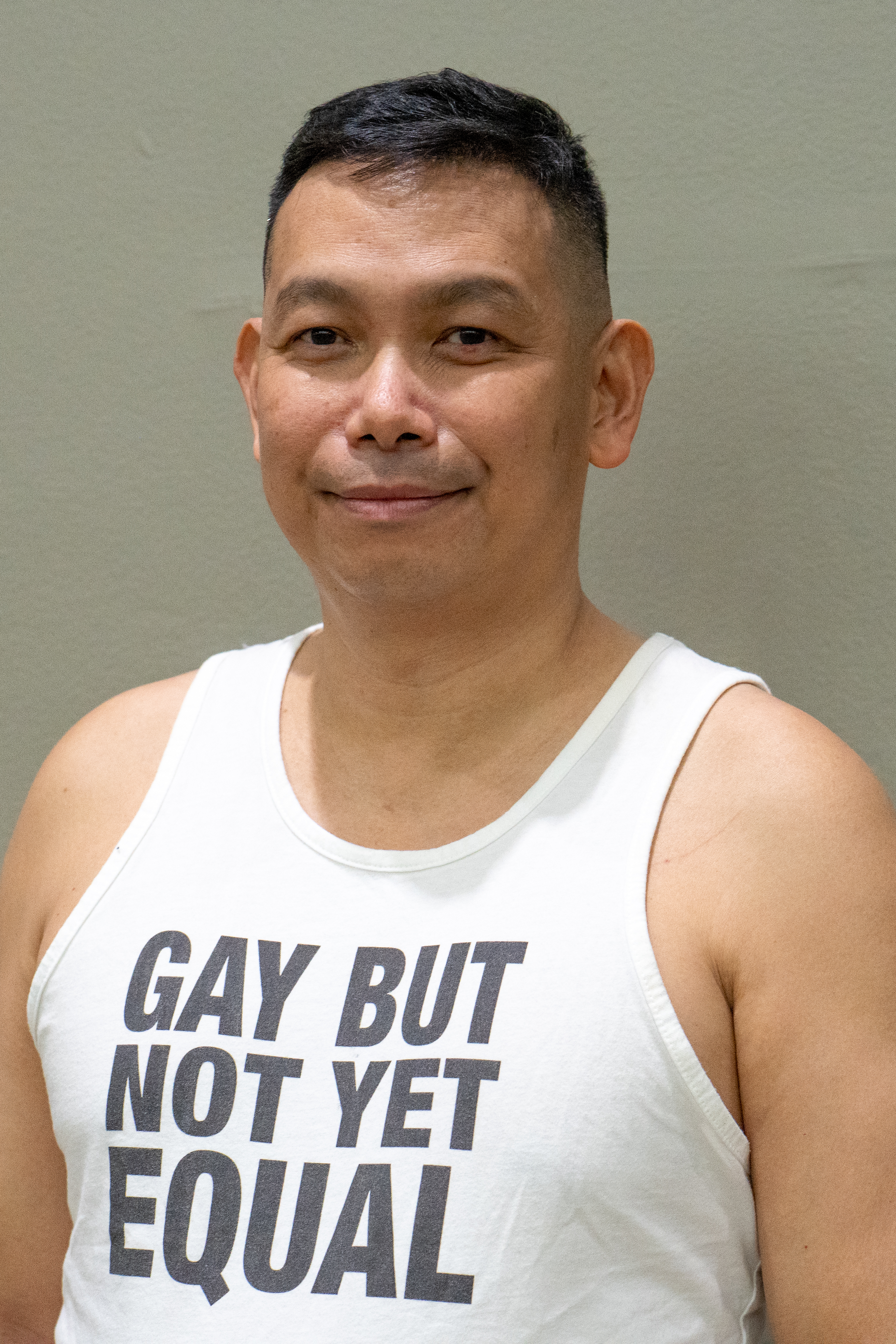
Koh at AWP 2026

Jee Leong Koh is a poet, publisher, and the founder/organizer of Singapore Unbound. He is Editor-In-Chief of Gaudy Boy, a press associated with Singapore Unbound and poetry editor of The Evergreen Review. He was raised in Singapore and currently lives in New York.

Koh's work "uses the rigidity of form to contain poetry that otherwise knows no bounds: love, sex and selfhood are all exposed, and equally explored."

Steep Tea was named a Best Book of the Year in 2015 by UK’s Financial Times. It was also a finalist for the 28th Lambda Literary Awards in the Gay Poetry category. The book engages with canonical female writers like Elizabeth Bishop and Eavan Boland while exploring "how being in a new place renders him critical of his past but also awakens his true identity."

Sections from The Pillow Book, a collection of zuihitsu, have been anthologized in Starry Island: New Writing from Singapore. The Pillow Book was also shortlisted for the Singapore Literature Prize.

== Books ==
- Steep Tea (Carcanet Press, 2015)
- The Pillow Book (Math Paper Press, 2012)
- Seven Studies for a Self Portrait (Bench Press, 2011)
- Equal to the Earth (Bench Press, 2009)
- Payday Loans: Poems (2007)
