= Gaudy Boy =

American independent publishing press

Gaudy Boy is the publishing arm of Singapore Unbound. Based in New York City, the independent press publishes work by authors of Asian heritage. The press is named after a phrase in Arthur Yap's poem, "gaudy turnout," "a gaudy boy afflicted with joy." Jee Leong Koh is the publisher and Editor-In-Chief.

The Gaudy Boy Poetry Book Prize is awarded once a year to an unpublished poetry manuscript in English by an author of Asian heritage. The prize was begun in 2018. Past winners include Nica Bengzon, Paula Jane Mendoza, Lawrence Ypil, and Jenifer Sang Eun Park. Past judges include Vijay Seshadri, Cyril Wong, and Wong May. Winning manuscripts have seen recognition from other venues, including the Lambda Literary Awards, the Believer, the Millions, and the Paris Review.

== Poetry publications ==
- Autobiography of Horse: A Poem by Jenifer Sang Eun Park (2019)
- The Experiment of The Tropics: Poems by Lawrence Lacambra Ypil (2019)
- Play for Time: Poems by Paula Mendoza (2020)

== Fiction publications ==
- Malay Sketches by Alfian Sa’at (2018)
- The Foley Artist: Stories by Ricco Villanueva Siasoco (2019)

== Non-fiction publications ==
- And the Walls Come Crumbling Down by Tania De Rozario (2020)
