= Manga Hero =

American publishing company

- Country of origin: United States
- Headquarters location: San Rafael, California
- Distribution: Saint Joseph Communications
- Publication types: Books
- Fiction genres: Graphic novels
- Official website: www.mangahero.com

Manga Hero is an American publisher based in San Rafael, California, that publishes graphic novels influenced by Japanese manga. The company's stories typically involve heroic characters that usually come from a Jewish or Christian background. Manga Hero's current publications include Paul: Tarsus to Redemption, written by Matthew Salisbury and Gabrielle Gniewek, as well as Judith: Captive to Conqueror and Many Are Called both written by Gabrielle Gniewek. The writers are from John Paul the Great Catholic University in San Diego. Sean Lam illustrated both series and lives in Singapore. Lam also illustrated a single volume comic titled It Takes a Wizard published by Seven Seas Entertainment in 2009. The organizers of World Youth Day 2011 recently announced that Manga Hero will launch a special comic titled Habemus Papam! where 300,000 copies will be distributed during the event in Madrid. This comic chronicles the life of Pope Benedict XVI and will be published in English and Spanish. Manga Hero hired Regina Doman in 2012 to write a more detailed graphic novel biography of Pope Benedict XVI, also illustrated by Lam, based on the World Youth Day 2011 book and also titled Habemus Papam! In 2014, the publisher developed a full color graphic novel about Pope Francis written by Regina Doman and illustrated by Sean Lam. Manga Hero is also developing graphic novels on Pope John Paul II and Maximilian Kolbe.
