= Jeffrey M. Monforton =

Roman Catholic Bishop

His Excellency, The Most Reverend Jeffrey Marc Monforton
- Auxiliary Bishop of Detroit; Titular Bishop of Centuria
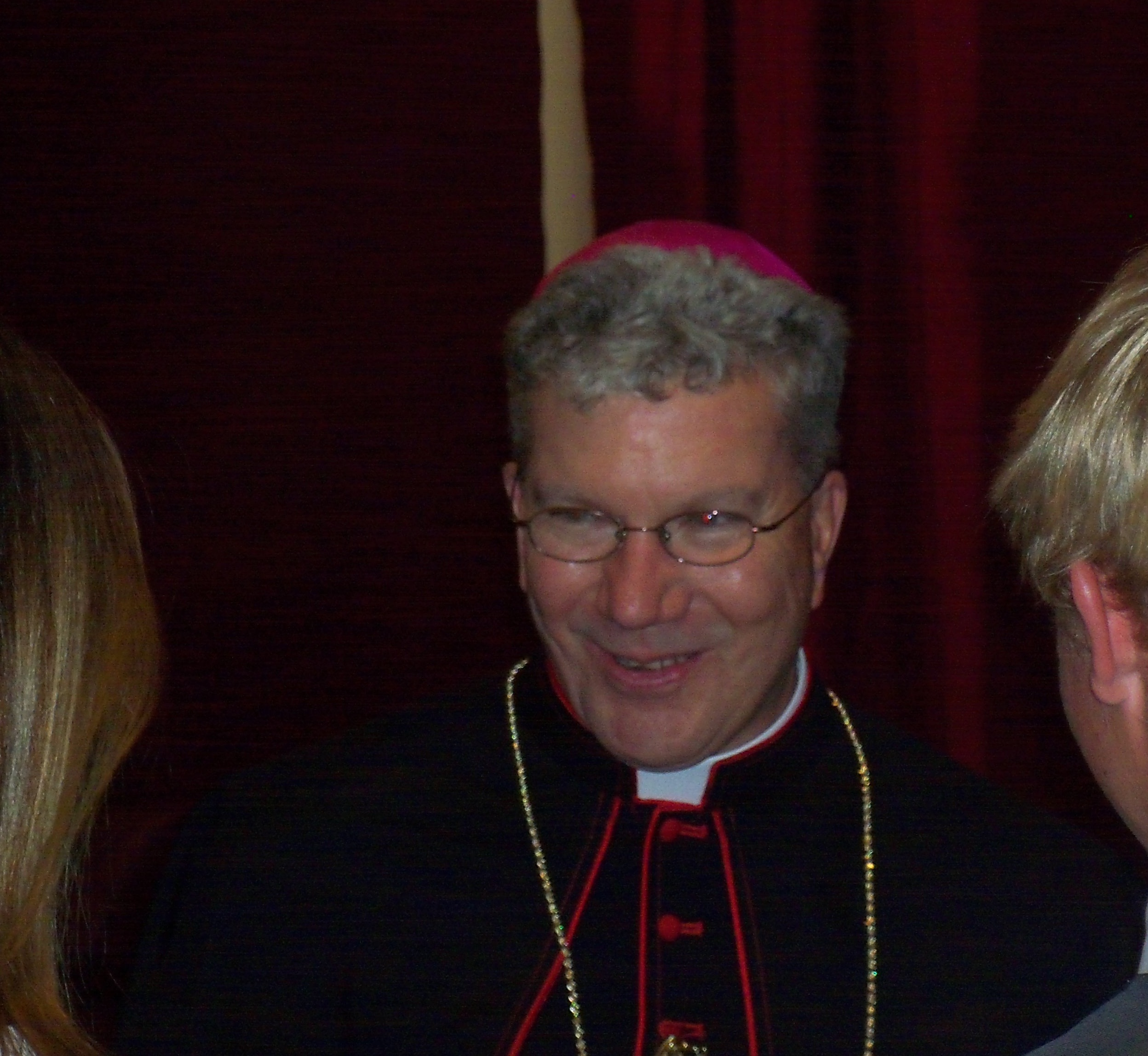
- Church: Catholic Church
- Archdiocese: Detroit
- Appointed: September 28, 2023
- Installed: November 7, 2023
- Other post: Titular Bishop of Centuria
- Previous post: Bishop of Steubenville (2012–2023)

Orders
- Ordination: June 25, 1994 by Adam Joseph Maida
- Consecration: September 10, 2012 by Dennis Marion Schnurr, Adam Joseph Maida, and Allen Henry Vigneron

Personal details
- Born: May 5, 1963 (age 63) Detroit, Michigan, US
- Education: Wayne State University; Sacred Heart Major Seminary; Pontifical Gregorian University
- Motto: Faith comes from hearing

Styles of Jeffrey Marc Monforton
- Reference style: His Excellency; The Most Reverend
- Spoken style: Your Excellency
- Religious style: Bishop

Jeffrey Marc Monforton (born May 5, 1963) is an American Catholic prelate who has served as an auxiliary bishop in the Archdiocese of Detroit since 2023. He previously served as Bishop of Steubenville from 2012 to 2023.

== Biography ==
=== Early life ===
Jeffrey Monforton was born on May 5, 1963, in Detroit, Michigan. He is the son of Marc Louis and Virginia Rose (Ackerman) Monforton, and is the eldest of three sons. Monforton received his early education at Tinkham Elementary School and John Marshall Junior High School in Westland, Michigan. He graduated from Wayne Memorial High School in Wayne, Michigan. Monforton then attended Wayne State University in Detroit.

After deciding to enter the priesthood, Monforton enrolled at Sacred Heart Major Seminary in Detroit. He received a Bachelor of Philosophy degree from Sacred Heart in 1989. He then attended Pontifical North American College and Pontifical Gregorian University in Rome, earning a Bachelor of Sacred Theology in 1992 and then a Licentiate in Sacred Theology.

=== Priesthood ===
On June 25, 1994, Monforton was ordained a priest for the Archdiocese of Detroit by Cardinal Adam Maida in the Cathedral of the Most Blessed Sacrament in Detroit.

After his 1994 ordination, the archdiocese assigned Monforton as the associate pastor at the National Shrine of the Little Flower Parish in Royal Oak, Michigan. He also taught religion at the parish high school for two years. In 1998, Maida appointed Monforton as his as a priest secretary in 1998. He was also named as a faculty member of Sacred Heart Seminary in 2002. He would later receive a Doctor of Sacred Theology degree from the Gregorian University.

Monforton traveled with Maida in 2005 to Rome for the funeral mass of Pope John Paul iI and the election of Pope Benedict XVI. Later that year, Monforton left Little Flower and his position as priest secretary to become pastor of St. Therese of Lisieux Parish in Shelby Township, Michigan. Benedict XVI named Monforton a chaplain of his holiness, with the title monsignor in 2005. In 2006, Maida appointed him as rector of Sacred Heart Seminary, serving there until 2012.

Monforton joined the board of trustees of Madonna University in Livonia, Michigan, in 2006 and served as an apostolic visitator of the Congregation for Catholic Education during the 2005 to 2006 academic year.

=== Bishop of Steubenville ===
Coat of arms as bishop of Steubenville

On July 3, 2012, Monforton was named the bishop of the Diocese of Steubenville by Benedict XVI. His episcopal consecration took place at the Finnigan Field House of Franciscan University of Steubenville on September 10, 2012. Archbishop Dennis Schnurr was the consecrating prelate, with Cardinal Maida and Archbishop Allen Vigneron serving as the co-consecrators.

Since 2012, Monforton has served on the United States Conference of Bishops (USCCB)'s Subcommittee on Aid to the Church in Central and Eastern Europe; in 2019, he was named chair of the subcommittee. In 2012, Monforton became a board member for the North American College and a member of its Development Committee.In 2013, Monforton announced plans to renovate Holy Name Cathedral in Steubenville.

In 2017, the diocese embarked on a year of re-consecration to the Immaculate Heart of Mary, patroness of the diocese. The diocese formed an 18-person ad hoc task force to ascertain the present pastoral needs of the diocese. The task force shared its survey with the priests and parishioners.

In May 2018, the diocese discovered that its financial department had been misallocating funds from employee paychecks since 2004. Monforton started a forensic audit of the diocesan finances dating back to 2004. As a result, the diocese was forced to pay $3.5 million in employee taxes. The financial crisis forced Monforton to suspend work on Holy Name Cathedral. Following austerity measures, the diocese balanced its financial standing. Msgr Kurt Kemo, vicar general of the diocese, was forced to resign from his diocesan positions; in 2021, he pleaded guilty to felony theft, having stolen over $289,000 from the diocese for his personal consumption.

In 2019, Monforton became a member of the USCCB's Committee on National Collections. Following a request from Catholic Relief Services, Monforton visited Iraq in 2019 to assess their needs.

After the 2020 murder of George Floyd by a police officer in Minneapolis, Monforton released this statement:

“The horrible and inexcusable death of Mr. George Floyd is indisputable proof that the cancer of racism continues to permeate our society. Any discrimination against our brothers and sisters, especially racial prejudice, is an active virus that poisons the life blood of any community and society. Together as we experience outrage resultant of Mr. Floyd’s death, we must confront the tragedy of racial injustice."

Monforton was elected in 2020 as a member of the Ecumenical and Interreligious Affairs and Evangelization and Catechesis committees for the USCCB.

In January 2021, Monforton and the diocese were sued for $1 million by a Glouster, Ohio, woman regarding sexual abuse by Fr Henry Foxhoven. The woman said that Foxhoven impregnated her in 2017 when she was a young teenager attending his church. The suit also stated that an affidavit for a 2018 arrest warrant stated that Foxhaven told Monforton that he had been “sexually involved with a juvenile member of his congregation and that she was now pregnant.” On April 14, 2021, the judged dismissed the diocese from the lawsuit, leaving Monforton as the defendant. He and the plaintiff reached a settlement in July 2022.

=== Auxiliary Bishop of Detroit ===
In September 2023, Pope Francis appointed Monforton as an auxiliary bishop of Detroit and titular bishop of Centuria. He began his role as auxiliary bishop on November 7, 2023.

== See also ==
- Catholic Church hierarchy
- Catholic Church in the United States
- Historical list of the Catholic bishops of the United States
- List of Catholic bishops of the United States
- Lists of patriarchs, archbishops, and bishops

== Episcopal succession ==
Catholic Church titles
Preceded by –	Auxiliary Bishop of Detroit; 2023–present	Succeeded by –
Preceded by Robert Daniel Conlon	Bishop of Steubenville; 2012–2023	Vacant
