= Holy Name Cathedral (Steubenville, Ohio) =

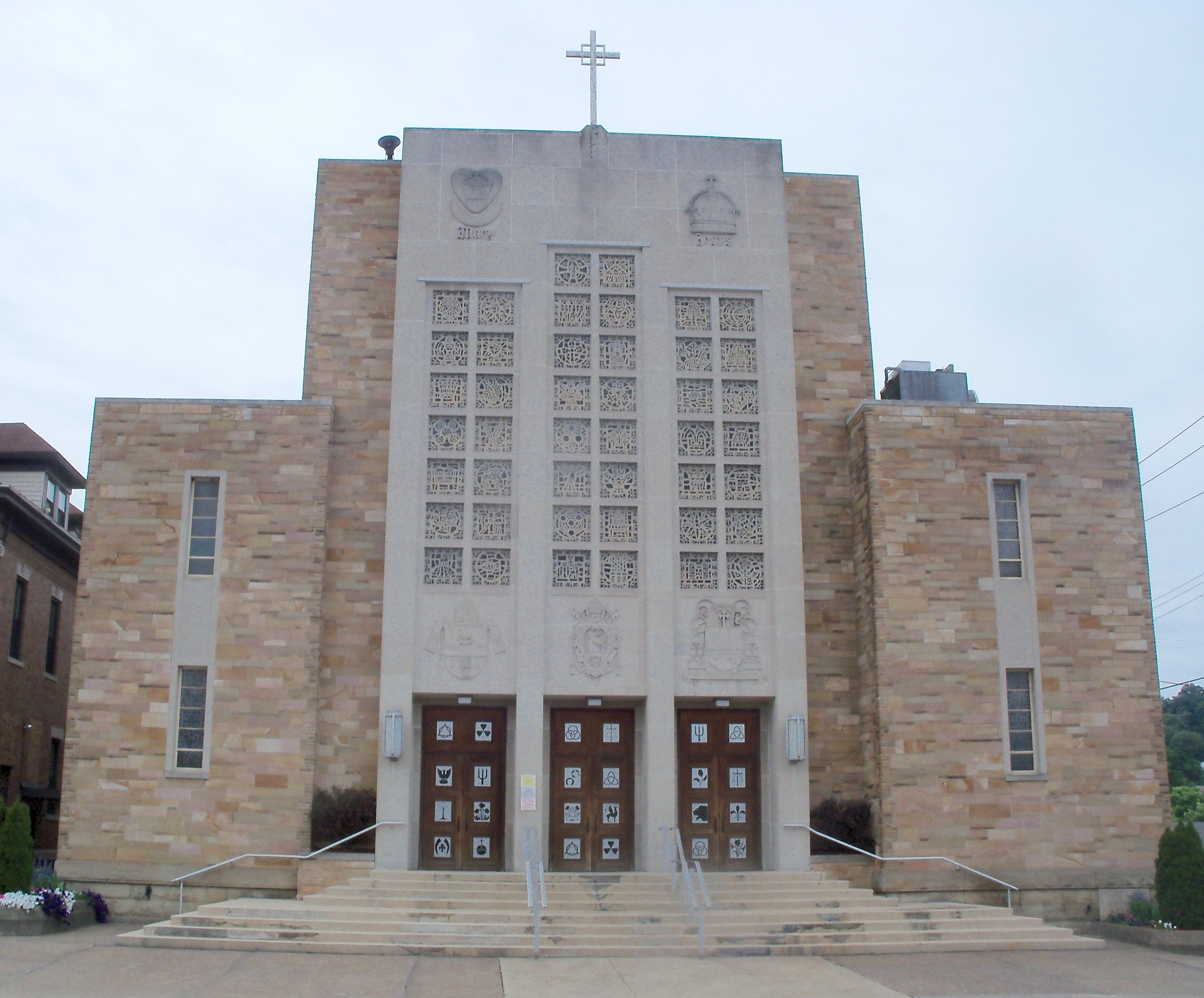

- Location in Ohio
- 40°21′20″N 80°37′10″W
- Location: Fifth and Slack Streets; Steubenville, Ohio
- Country: United States
- Denomination: Roman Catholic Church
- Website: www.triumphofthecross.org

History
- Founded: 1885

Architecture
- Completed: 1890 (original); 1957 (rebuilt)

Administration
- Diocese: Steubenville

Clergy
- Bishop: Sede Vacante
- Rector: Rev. Matthew Gossett

Holy Name Cathedral is a Catholic cathedral and parish church in Steubenville, Ohio, United States. It is the seat of the Diocese of Steubenville.

== History ==
Holy Name Parish was founded in 1885. The current structure was completed in 1890 and rebuilt from 1953 to 1957. It became a cathedral when the Diocese of Steubenville was established in 1945.

On June 8, 2008, under Bishop R. Daniel Conlon, Holy Name parish merged with Holy Rosary, St. Anthony, St. Pius X, St. Stanislaus and Servants of Christ the King parishes to form Triumph of the Cross Parish under the leadership of the Rev. Tim McGuire. The parish worships in Holy Name Cathedral and Holy Rosary Church.

Bishop Conlon began raising funds to construct a cathedral to house the parish on Steubenville's west side. After raising $8.5 million, he decided in November 2011 that it would be too risky to incur the large debt construction would require and shelved the plan. In June 2013, Conlon's successor, Bishop Jeffrey Monforton, announced that the diocese would retain the current cathedral and renovate it to meet the challenges of the region. His plan included upgraded technology to allow broadcast of Masses and other events to those unable to attend, installing security systems to allow 24-hour visitation and restoring the towers which were removed in a 1957 renovation. He added that when possible, the diocese would employ local residents and firms to perform work and that the diocese would work with nearby Holy Trinity Greek Orthodox Church and the Public Library of Steubenville and Jefferson County to revitalize the neighborhood.

The cathedral was closed in 2014 when renovation plans were announced. In 2018, Bishop Monforton suspended all major expenditures in the diocese until an investigation into the diocesan finance department was complete. A new roof was put on the cathedral in 2019 and interior demolition was planned during the following winter. In May 2022, Bishop Monforton announced his decision to discontinue the plans to renovate Holy Name Cathedral. The scope of the project was unrealistic given the financial malfeasance of two employees, the local economy based on coal mining and steel production, as well as a declining and aging population. A final decision on what to do with Holy Name has yet to be made.

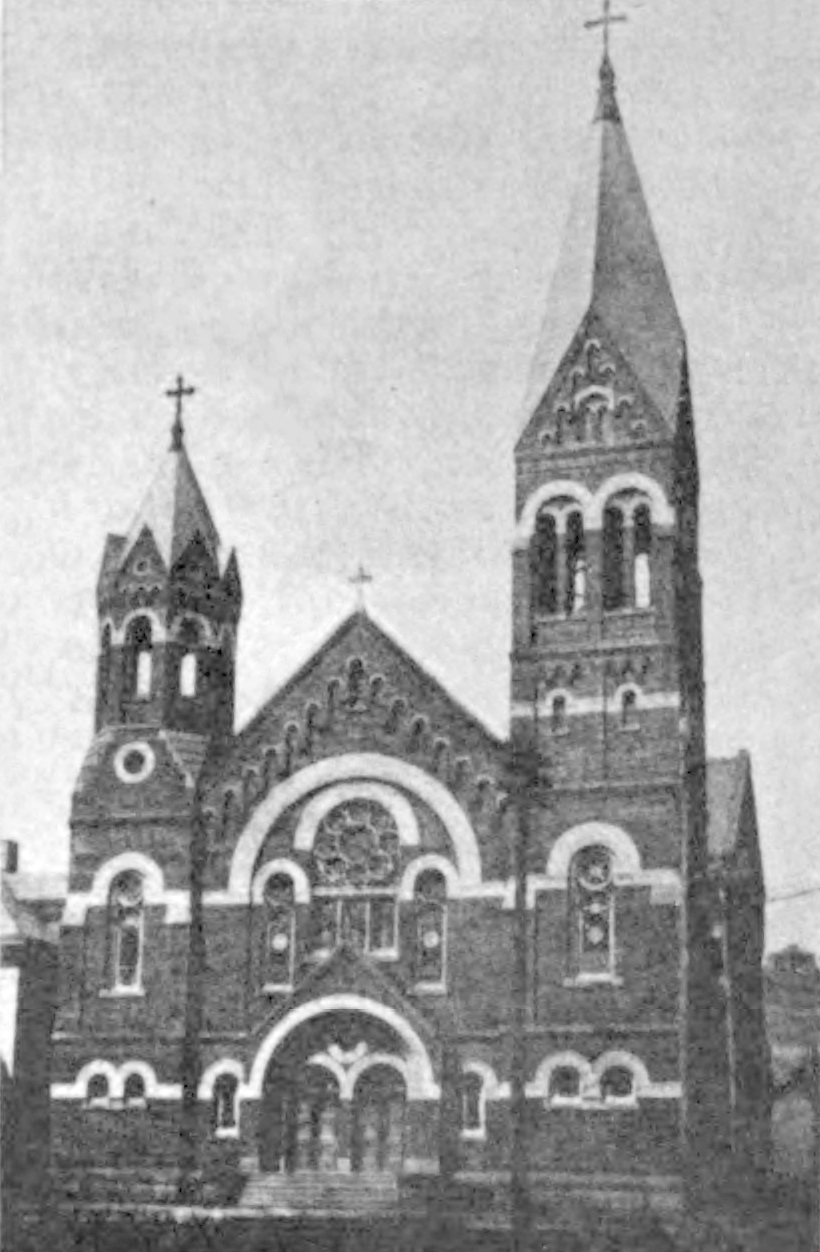
Holy Name Cathedral in 1910

== See also ==
- List of Catholic cathedrals in the United States
- List of cathedrals in the United States
