= Regina Doman =

American novelist

- Born: 1970 (age 55–56); Havertown, Pennsylvania, U.S.
- Education: Franciscan University of Steubenville
- Occupation: Catholic fiction writer

Regina Doman (born 1970) is an American writer of Catholic fiction.

== Early life and education ==
She was born in 1970 in Havertown, Pennsylvania. Doman graduated in 1988 from Koinoinia Academy of Warren, New Jersey. She received her bachelor's degree in 1992 from Franciscan University of Steubenville with a major in TV Communications and concentrations in drama and scriptwriting.

== Career ==
After graduating from university, she worked for two years as an assistant editor for Catholics United for the Faith in New York City. Three years later – in 1997 – she released her first novel, Snow White and Rose Red: A Modern Fairy Tale. In 2002, it was republished under the title The Shadow of the Bear. Its sequel, Black as Night, was published in 2004. In 2012, her OEL manga biography of Pope Benedict XVI, Habemus Papem: Pope Benedict XVI, was published by American publisher Manga Hero. Along with Rebecca Bratten, Doman co-authored Catholic Philosopher Chick Makes Her Debut, also published in 2012.

Doman is a former editor with Sophia Institute Press.

She has produced audio dramas including Enemy Brothers, Perpetua's Choice, and her own book Shadow of the Bear.

== Books ==
- Snow White and Rose Red: A Modern Fairy Tale (1997), republished as The Shadow of the Bear (2002)
- Black as Night (2004)
- Angel in the Waters (2004)
- Waking Rose (2007)
- The Midnight Dancers (2008)
- Alex O'Donnell and the 40 Cyber Thieves (2010)
- Rapunzel Let Down (2013)
- Habemus Papem: Pope Benedict XVI (2012)
- Catholic Philosopher Chick Makes Her Debut (with Rebecca Bratten Weiss; 2012)
- Pope Francis: I Believe in Mercy (2013)
- Catholic Philosopher Chick Comes on Strong (with Rebecca Bratten Weiss; 2015)
