= Albert Henry Ottenweller =

His Excellency, The Most Reverend Albert Henry Ottenweller
- Bishop of Steubenville
- Church: Roman Catholic Church
- See: Diocese of Steubenville
- In office: October 11, 1977 - January 28, 1992
- Predecessor: Anthony John King Mussio
- Successor: Gilbert Ignatius Sheldon
- Previous posts: Auxiliary Bishop of Toledo; 1974 to 1977

Orders
- Ordination: June 19, 1943 by Karl Joseph Alter
- Consecration: May 29, 1974 by John Anthony Donovan

Personal details
- Born: April 5, 1916 Stanford, Montana, USA
- Died: September 23, 2012 (aged 96) Toledo, Ohio, USA
- Education: St. Joseph's College; Catholic University of America
- Motto: Peace, the fruit of justice

Albert Henry Ottenweller (April 5, 1916 – September 23, 2012) was an American prelate of the Roman Catholic Church. He served as the second bishop of the Diocese of Steubenville in Ohio from 1977 to 1992. He previously served as an auxiliary bishop of the Diocese of Toledo in Ohio from 1974 to 1977.

== Biography ==
=== Early life ===
Albert Ottenweller was born in Stanford, Montana, to Charles and Mary (née Hake) Ottenweller. At age six, his family moved to Leipsic, Ohio, where he attended the parochial school of St. Mary's Parish. He then attended St. Joseph's High School and St. Joseph's College, both in Rensselaer, Indiana. Ottenweller continued his studies at the Catholic University of America in Washington, D.C., where he earned a Licentiate of Sacred Theology in 1943.

=== Priesthood ===
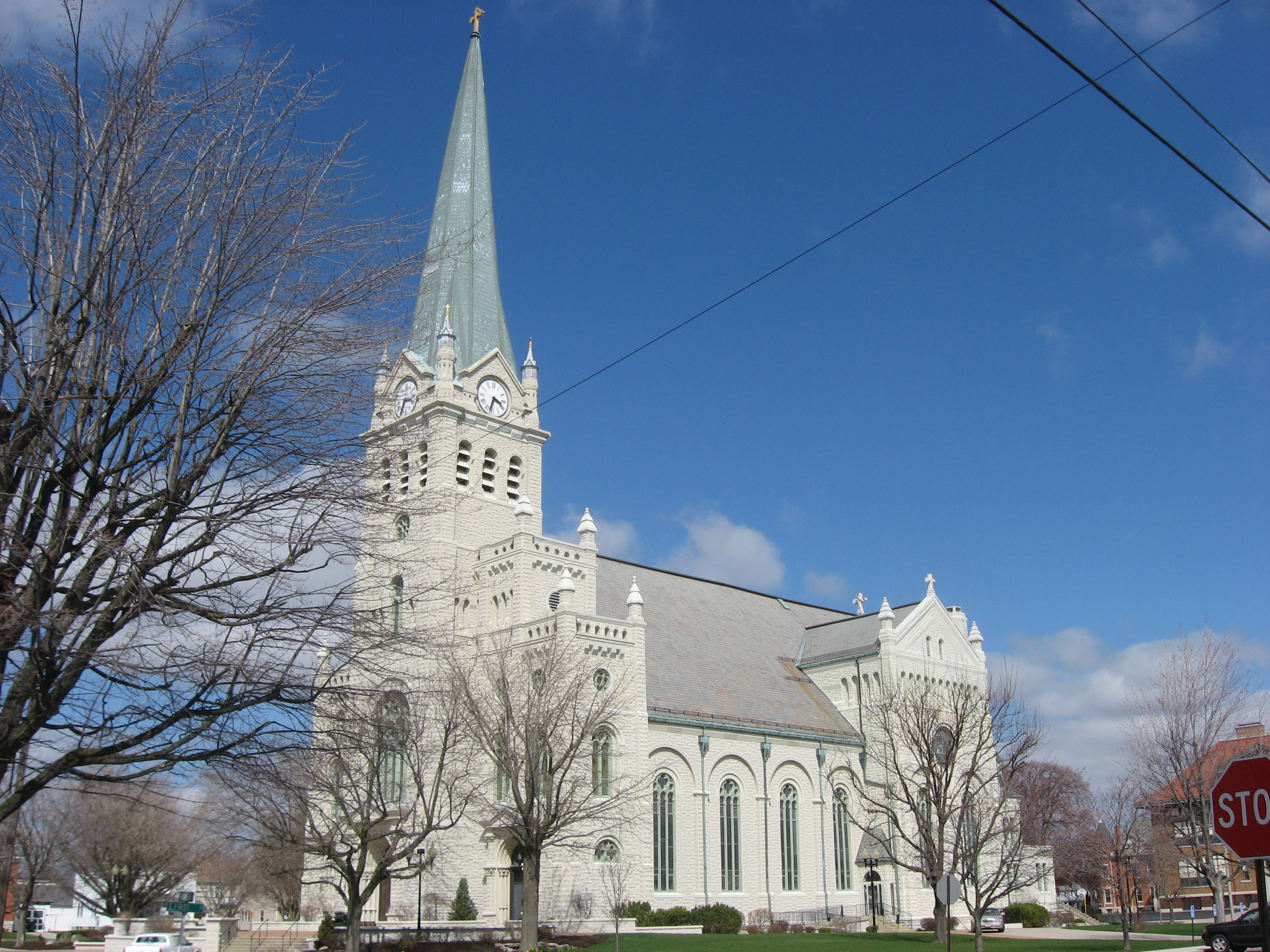
St. John's Catholic Church, Delphos, Ohio (2010)

Ottenweller was ordained to the priesthood for the Diocese of Toledo by Bishop Karl Alter on June 19, 1943. After his ordination, Ottenweller had the following parish assignments in Ohio:

- Curate at St. John's in Delphos (1943 - 1959)
- Curate at St. Richard's in Swanton (1959 – 1961)
- Pastor of St. Joseph's Parish in Blakeslee (1961 to 1962)
- Pastor of Our Lady of Mount Carmel in Bono (1962 – 1968)
- Pastor of St. John's in Delphos (1968 – 1976)
- Pastor of St. Michael's in Findlay (1976 – 1977)

In addition to his pastoral duties, Ottenweller served as director of the Spanish Apostolate (1958 – 1969) and was named vicar general of the diocese in 1968.

=== Auxiliary Bishop of Toledo ===
On April 17, 1974, Pope Paul VI appointed Ottenweller as an auxiliary bishop of Toledo and titular bishop of Perdices. He was consecrated at Our Lady Queen of the Most Holy Rosary Cathedral in Toledo by Bishop John Donovan on May 29, 1974. Ottenweller served as head of the United States Conference of Catholic Bishops Committee on the Laity from 1978 to 1981.

=== Bishop of Steubenville ===
Ottenweller was appointed bishop of Steubenville on September 27, 1977, by Paul VI. He was installed on November 22, 1977. In 1989, Ottenweller was arrested with other protestors outside a women's health clinic that provided abortion services in Youngstown, Ohio. Refusing to post bail, he spent six days in jail before his trial.

=== Retirement and legacy ===
On January 28, 1992, Pope John Paul II accepted Ottenweller's resignation as bishop of Steubenville. After his resignation, he moved back to Toledo. He helped establish the Center for Servant Leadership, an institution in Toledo to support individual development.

Ottenweller died on September 23, 2012, at the Ursuline Center in Toledo after a brief illness.

== See also ==
- Steubenville Diocese
- Roman Catholic Diocese of Toledo
