= Taparura =

Ancient Berber, Punic and Roman city

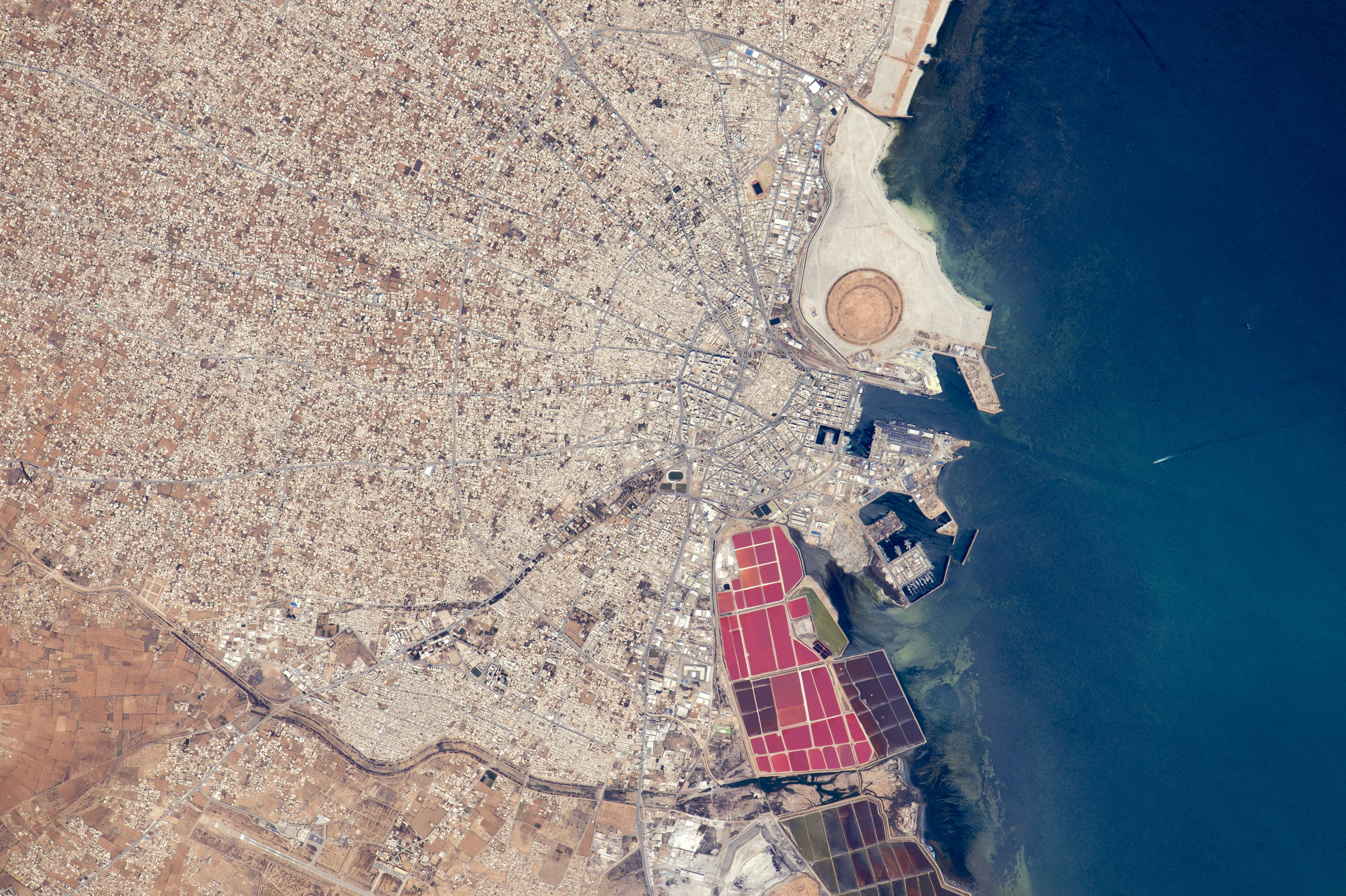
- Taparura from space

- Location within Tunisia
- 34°44′20″N 10°46′34″E
- Type: Settlement
- Location: Sfax Governorate, Tunisia

Taparura was an ancient Berber, Punic and Roman city in the location of modern-day Sfax, Tunisia. It was a former Catholic diocese.

The same ancient name was revived in the 1980s as a coastal urban development project on the location of former chemical industries.

== Etymology ==
The Latin name Taparura originates in the Greek Taphroúria Ταφρούρια which means 'the fortified' place or settlement. It is uncertain whether the Greek name was given after a Greek settlement or by Phoenicians as part of their commercial and military settlements during the 4th century B.C.

The same Greek meaning was translated into Berber in the Byzantine era in Ksar S-Fa-Ekez which gives the current name of the city Sfax.

== The ancient city ==
Taparura was originally a civitas (town), within Byzacena during the Roman Empire. The town was also an ancient Christian bishopric, whose seat was resident in that Roman town. Only one bishop of Taparura is known, Limeniano, who attended the Council of Carthage (411). The ancient bishopric survives today, as a titular see of the Roman Catholic Church. Archaeologists have uncovered a basilica and baptistry.

== The urban coastal development project ==
Taparura is today the name given to a new urban development area of the city. It covers 420 hectares of newly filled land over the phosphogypsum stack of a former Swedish-Tunisian NPK fertilizer joint-venture.

In 1985 a new development proposal was formulated that would see additional land taken from the Mediterranean and integrated as an urban park, a beach of three kilometers, as well as residential, commercial and tertiary zones. The first works for its revitalization began in 2006 and consisted of environmental remediation and filling.

The "Sfax Northern Coast Planning and Development Company" (nicknamed "The Taparura Company") is the central-state-owned company in charge of the project, with little legal binding to the local institutions of Sfax. Since 2008 after the end of the land reclamation works, the company remained idle with no significant progress in terms of planning and development. The central decision-making process is thought to be the main constraint to the implementation of the project according to local activists.

== See also ==
- Autenti, a nearby Roman settlement
- Thenae, a nearby Roman settlement
