= Robert Daniel Conlon =

American prelate (born 1948)

His Excellency, The Most Reverend Robert Daniel Conlon
- Bishop Emeritus of Joliet
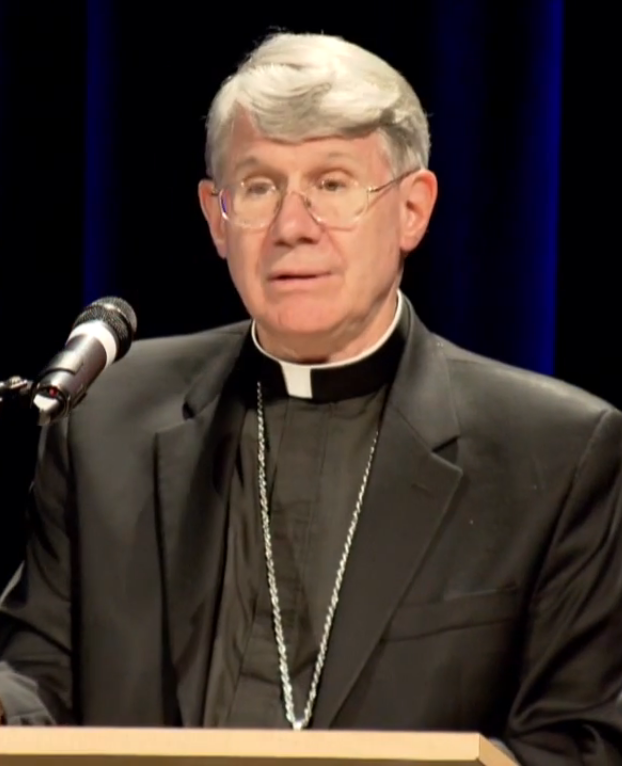
- Bishop Conlon at the 2015 Steubenville Conference
- See: Diocese of Joliet
- Appointed: May 17, 2011
- Installed: July 14, 2011
- Retired: May 4, 2020
- Predecessor: J. Peter Sartain
- Successor: Ronald Aldon Hicks
- Previous post: Bishop of Steubenville (2002-2011)

Orders
- Ordination: January 15, 1977 by Joseph Bernardin
- Consecration: May 31, 2002 by Daniel Edward Pilarczyk, Gilbert Sheldon, and Sydney Anicetus Charles

Personal details
- Born: December 4, 1948 (age 77) Cincinnati, Ohio, USA
- Education: Athenaeum of Ohio; St. Paul University
- Motto: Take courage

Styles of Robert Daniel Conlon
- Reference style: His Excellency; The Most Reverend
- Spoken style: Your Excellency
- Religious style: Bishop

Ordination history of Robert Daniel Conlon
History
Episcopal consecration
- Principal consecrator: Daniel Edward Pilarczyk
- Co-consecrators: Gilbert Sheldon, Sydney Anicetus Charles

Robert Daniel Conlon (born December 4, 1948) is an American Catholic prelate who served as Bishop of Joliet from 2011 to 2020. From 2002 to 2011, he served as Bishop of Steubenville.

== Early life and education ==
Robert Conlon was born on December 4, 1948, in Cincinnati, Ohio, the eldest of the six children of Robert and Carla (née Holzman) Conlon. As a child, he attended St. Mary Church in Hyde Park, Ohio. Conlon later attended Purcell High School and Saint Gregory Seminary in Cincinnati, graduating in 1966 from St. Gregory. Conlon then entered the Athenaeum of Ohio in Cincinnati, receiving his degree in 1975.

On March 9, 1974, Conlon was ordained a deacon at the Cathedral Basilica of St. Peter in Chains in Cincinnati. After receiving his diaconate, Conlon served as a deacon at St. Agnes Parish in Cincinnati.

== Ordination and ministry ==
On January 15, 1977, Conlon was ordained to the priesthood at St. Agnes Church for the Archdiocese of Cincinnati by Archbishop Joseph Bernardin. After his ordination, Conlon was assigned as associate pastor at Immaculate Heart of Mary Parish in Cincinnati, serving there until July 1982. In 1981, Conlon also assumed the roles of director of the archdiocesan Office of Planning and Research and assistant chancellor.

In 1983, Conlon entered St. Paul University in Ottawa, Ontario. He was awarded a Doctorate of Canon Law degree and a philosophy degree in January 1987. After returning to Cincinnati in 1987, Conlon was appointed chancellor and director of the Department of Executive Services for the archdiocese. He would hold these positions until 1996. On August 6, 1996, Conlon became pastor of Holy Redeemer Parish in New Bremen, Ohio.

== Bishop of Steubenville ==
On May 31, 2002, Pope John Paul II appointed Conlon as bishop of Steubenville. He was consecrated at the Finnegan Field House at the Franciscan University of Steubenville in Steubenville, Ohio, on August 6, 2002, by Archbishop Daniel Pilarczyk with Bishops Gilbert Sheldon and Sydney Charles serving as co-consecrators. Conlon took as his episcopal motto: "Take Courage" (Daniel 10:19, John 16:33).

In 2005, Conlon led a group of volunteers to New Orleans to assist the victims of Hurricane Katrina, after hearing Archbishop Alfred Hughes speak about the devastation that Katrina caused in his Archdiocese of New Orleans.

Within the United States Conference of Catholic Bishops, Conlon served as the chair of the Committee for the Protection of Children and Young People from 2011 to 2014.

== Bishop of Joliet ==
On May 17, 2011, Pope Benedict XVI named Conlon as the fifth bishop of Joliet. On July 14, 2011, he was installed at the Cathedral of St. Raymond Nonnatus in Joliet, Illinois.

In September 2012, Conlon created a controversy by reinstating Reverend F. Lee Ryan, to ministry for homebound parishioners. The diocese had suspended Ryan in 2010 from St. Edmund Parish in Watseka, Illinois, and St. Joseph Mission in Crescent City, Illinois, because it had determined a sexual abuse allegation against Ryan from the 1970s was credible. According to The Huffington Post, Conlon ruled that since child molestation was not a serious crime under canon law in the 1970s, the diocese could only limit Ryan in ministry and not remove him completely. After dealing with large opposition within the diocese to this decision, Conlon reversed himself on September 18, 2012, and permanently removed Ryan from ministry.

Conlon wrote his first pastoral letter to the diocese in June 2019, entitled "Go, He Said." In this letter, he wrote of having witnessed "an enormous decline in people's participation in the life of the Church" but that Pope Francis had inspired his attitude. He went on the write that Catholics must prepare to be missionary disciples and there was a great need for the involvement of the lay faithful.

In October 2019, Conlon and the Diocese of Joliet were named in a $100,000 sexual abuse lawsuit. The plaintiff was a developmentally disabled man who had been sexually assaulted in 2017 at the Shapiro Developmental Center in Kankakee, Illinois. The assailant, Fr Richard Jacklin, was arrested for the assault. The lawsuit charged the diocese and Conlon with improper vetting of Jacklin and negligent supervision of him.

On December 27, 2019, the diocese announced that Conlon was taking an immediate medical leave of absence. Bishop Richard Pates was appointed as apostolic administrator of the diocese while Conlon was on medical leave. Conlon's medical condition was not disclosed.

== Retirement ==
Four months after Conlon went on medical leave, Pope Francis accepted his letter of resignation as bishop of Joliet on May 4, 2020. In a statement, Conlon said he had found 2019 "challenging":

"I experienced a lot of stress and fatigue, which I did not always handle well, along with some serious medical issues, plus the death of my best friend... I am no longer able to carry the burden of leadership of a large diocese."

Catholic Church titles
Preceded by Gilbert Ignatius Sheldon	Bishop of Steubenville; 2002–2011	Succeeded by Jeffrey Marc Monforton
Preceded by J. Peter Sartain	Bishop of Joliet in Illinois; 2011–2020	Succeeded by Ronald Aldon Hicks
