= Diocese of Steubenville =

Latin Catholic ecclesiastical jurisdiction in Ohio, US

Coordinates: 40°21′56″N 80°37′53″W

Diocese of Steubenville Dioecesis Steubenvicensis
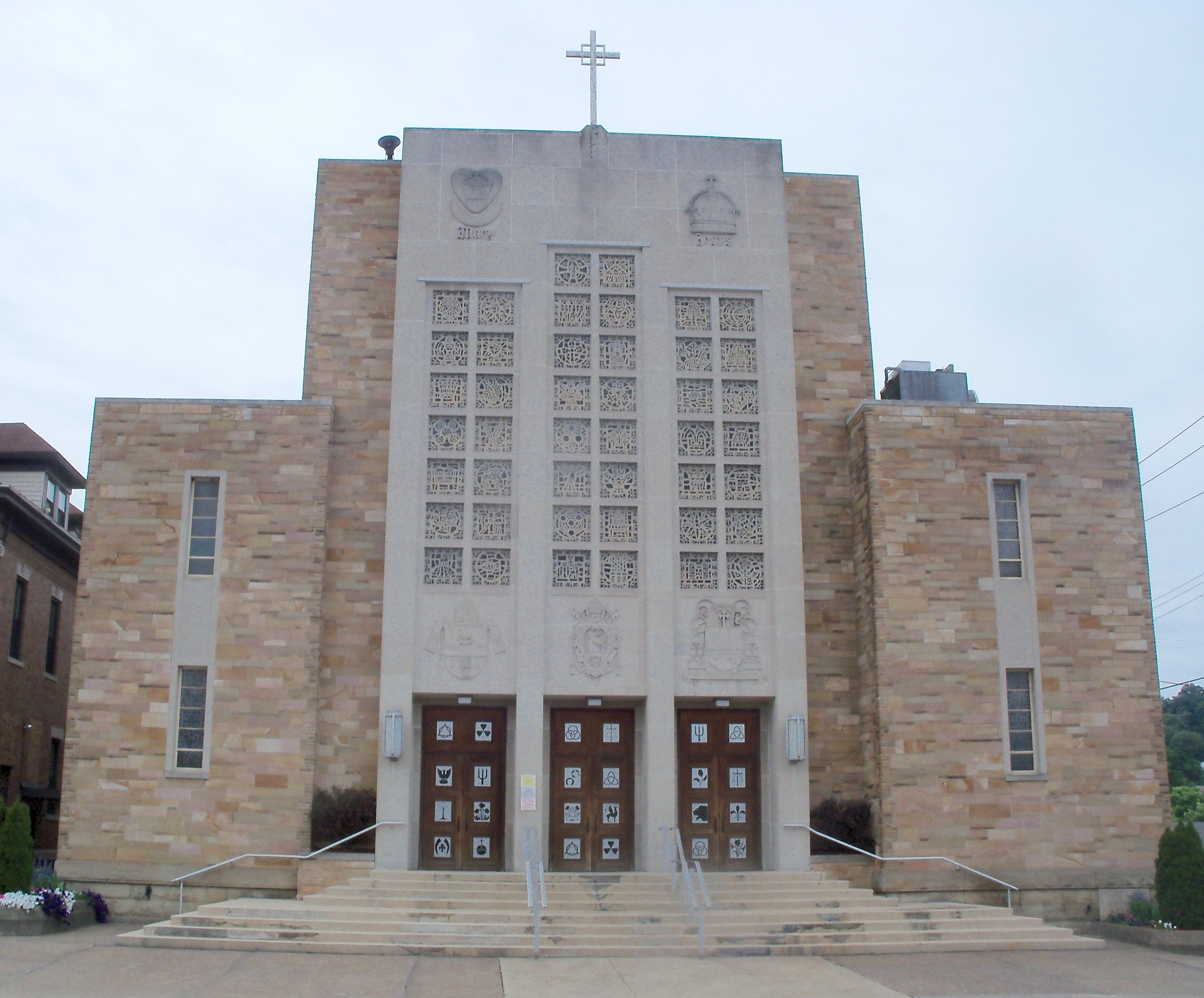
- Holy Name Cathedral (closed since 2014)

- Coat of arms

Location
- Country: United States
- Territory: 13 counties in Southeastern Ohio.
- Ecclesiastical province: Cincinnati

Statistics
- Area: 5,913 sq mi (15,310 km^{2})
- Population: Total; Catholics: (as of 2023); 481,411▼; 28,339▼ (5.9%)
- Parishes: 50▼

Information
- Denomination: Catholic
- Sui iuris church: Latin Church
- Rite: Roman Rite
- Established: October 21, 1944 (82 years ago)
- Cathedral: Holy Name Cathedral
- Patron saint: Immaculate Heart of Mary
- Secular priests: 56 diocesan▲30 (Religious Orders)▼16 Permanent Deacons▲

Current leadership
- Pope: Leo XIV
- Bishop: Sede vacante
- Metropolitan Archbishop: Robert Gerald Casey
- Apostolic Administrator: Edward M. Lohse
- Vicar General: Very Rev. James M. Dunfee, V.G., MA, STL

Map
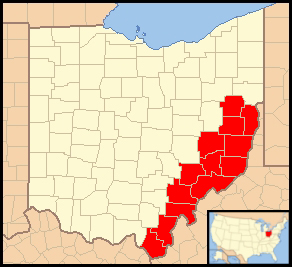

Website
- diosteub.org

The Diocese of Steubenville (Latin: Dioecesis Steubenvicensis) is a diocese of the Catholic Church covering thirteen counties in southeastern Ohio in the United States. It is a suffragan diocese of the Archdiocese of Cincinnati. The official seat for the diocese is Holy Name Cathedral in Steubenville, but it has been closed since 2014. As of February 2025, the position of bishop is vacant. Edward M. Lohse, the bishop of the Diocese of Kalamazoo, is the apostolic administrator.

== History ==
=== 1700 to 1940 ===
During the 18th century, present-day Ohio was part of the French colony of New France. The Diocese of Quebec had jurisdiction over the region. In 1763, after the French-Indian War, Ohio Country became part of the British Province of Quebec. To prevent hostile interactions with Native Americans in the area, the British had forbidden settlement in Ohio by inhabitants of the 13 American colonies. After the American Revolution ended in 1783, the Ohio area became part of the new United States. In 1784, the Vatican established the Apostolic Prefecture of the United States so as to remove American Catholics from the jurisdiction of a British diocese.

The Vatican erected the Diocese of Baltimore in 1789 in place of the prefecture. In 1808, Pope Pius VII erected the Diocese of Bardstown in Kentucky, a vast diocese with jurisdiction over the new state of Ohio along with the other midwestern states. Pope Pius VII erected the Diocese of Cincinnati in 1821, taking all of Ohio from Bardstown. The first Catholic church in Steubenville, St. Peter's, was dedicated in 1835. St. Lawrence O'Toole Parish was established for Irish railway workers in Ironton in 1852. In 1868, Pope Pius IX erected the Diocese of Columbus, including the Steubenville area.

Four members of the Sylvania Franciscan Sisters in 1931 took over management of Gill Memorial Hospital in downtown Steubenville. Today it is Trinity Medical System East.

=== 1940 to 2000 ===
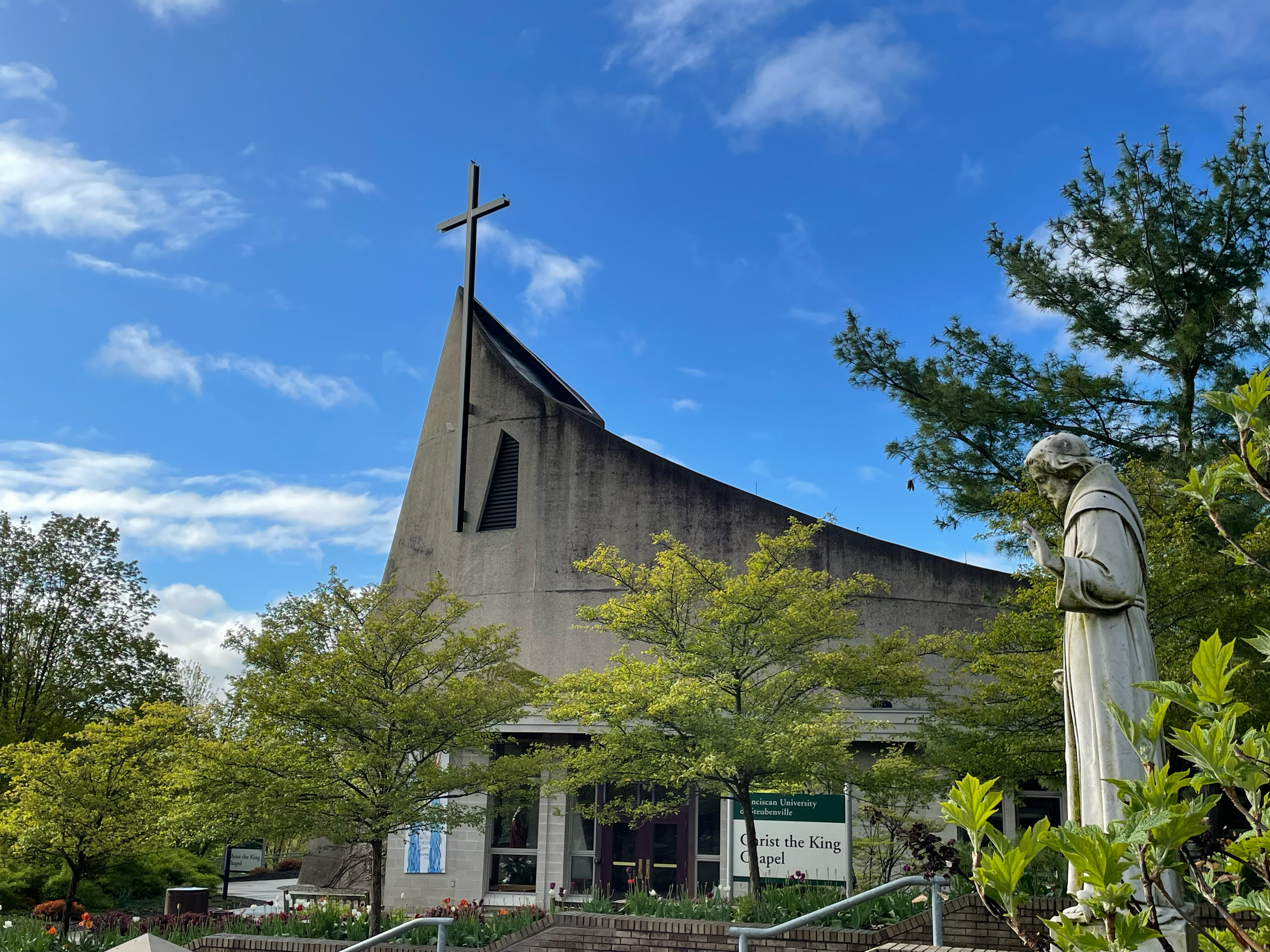
Franciscan University of Steubenville, Steubenville, Ohio (2023)

Pope Pius XII erected the Diocese of Steubenville on October 21, 1944. It included thirteen counties (Carroll, Jefferson, Harrison, Guernsey, Belmont, Noble, Monroe, Morgan, Washington, Athens, Meigs, Gallia, and Lawrence) from the Diocese of Columbus. The pope appointed Anthony Mussio the first bishop of Steubenville. Mussio in 1945 founded the diocesan newspaper, The Steubenville Register.

In 1946, at Mussio's invitation, the Franciscan Friars of the Third Order Regular opened the College of Steubenville to educate veterans of World War II. It is today the Franciscan University of Steubenville.Three religious sisters in 1951, with assistance from Mussio, opened St. Johns Villa, a center for the developmentally disabled, in Steubenville.

In 1958, Mussio joined with the other Catholic bishops of Ohio in opposing a so-called right to work amendment to the Ohio Constitution that would have outlawed mandatory union membership in unionized workplaces. He also opened St. John Vianney, a minor seminary in Steubenville amd Samaritan House, a food pantry and thrift store in Steubenville. Mussio also organized Catholic Social Services for the diocese. The Camaldolese Order established the Holy Family Hermitage in McConnelsville in 1959. Unable to expand Gill Memorial Hospital, the Sylvania Franciscan Sisters in 1960 opened a second hospital in Steubenville, St. John's Medical Center. Today it is Trinity Medical System West.

In accord with the liturgical reforms of the Second Vatican Council in the early 1960s, he established the Steubenville Ecumenical Institute to foster better relationships among Christians and Jews. After 33 years as bishop of Steubenville, Mussio retired in 1977. As bishop, Mussio established 73 parishes and 20 missions in the diocese.

Auxiliary Bishop Albert Ottenweller of the Diocese of Toledo succeeded Mussio the same year. In 1989, Ottenweller was arrested with other protestors outside a health clinic that provided abortion services for women in Youngstown. Refusing to post bail, he spent six days in jail before his trial. Ottenweller retired as bishop of Steubenville in 1992. Auxiliary Bishop Gilbert Sheldon of the Diocese of Cleveland succeeded him that same year.

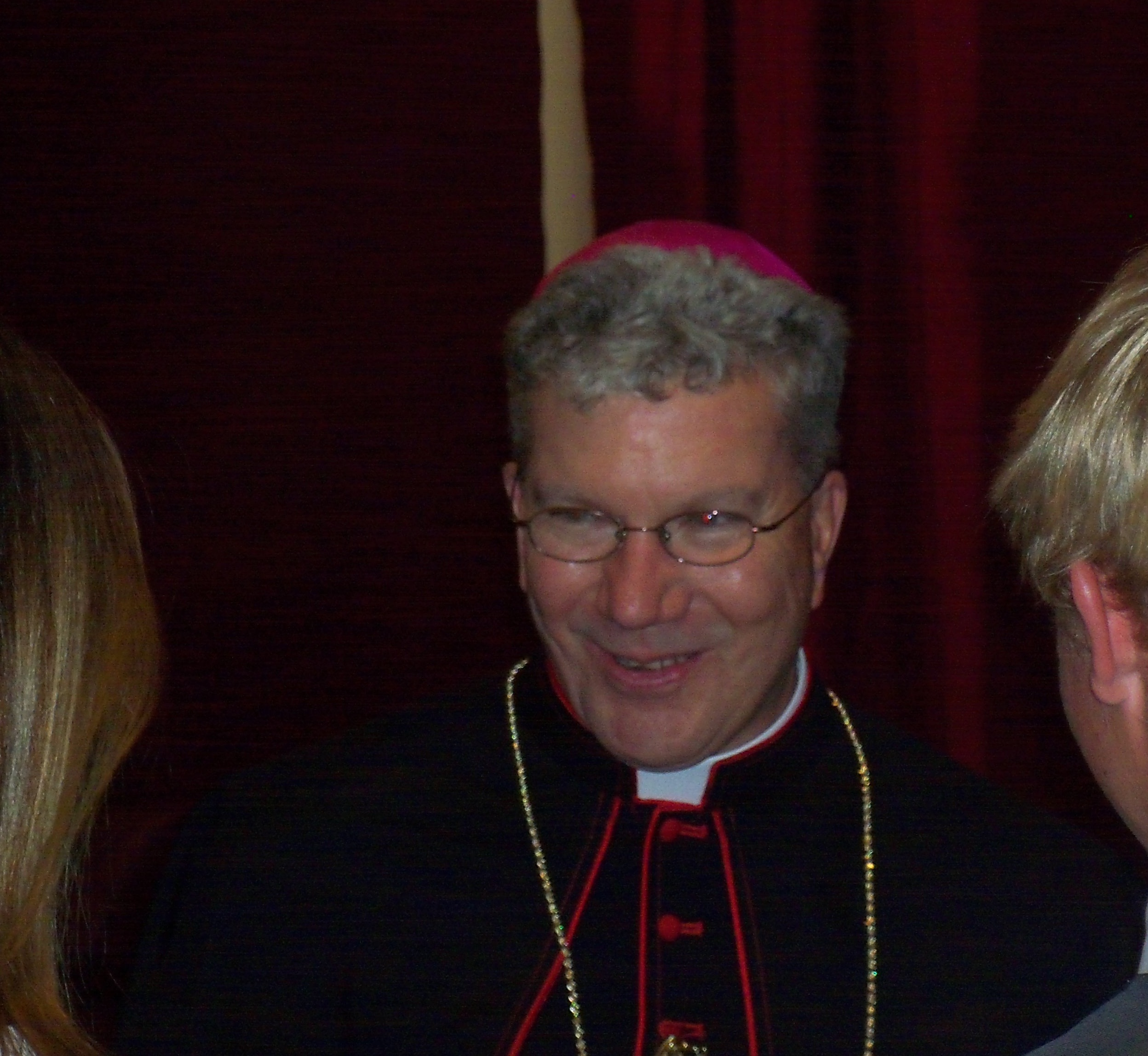
Bishop Monforton (2012)

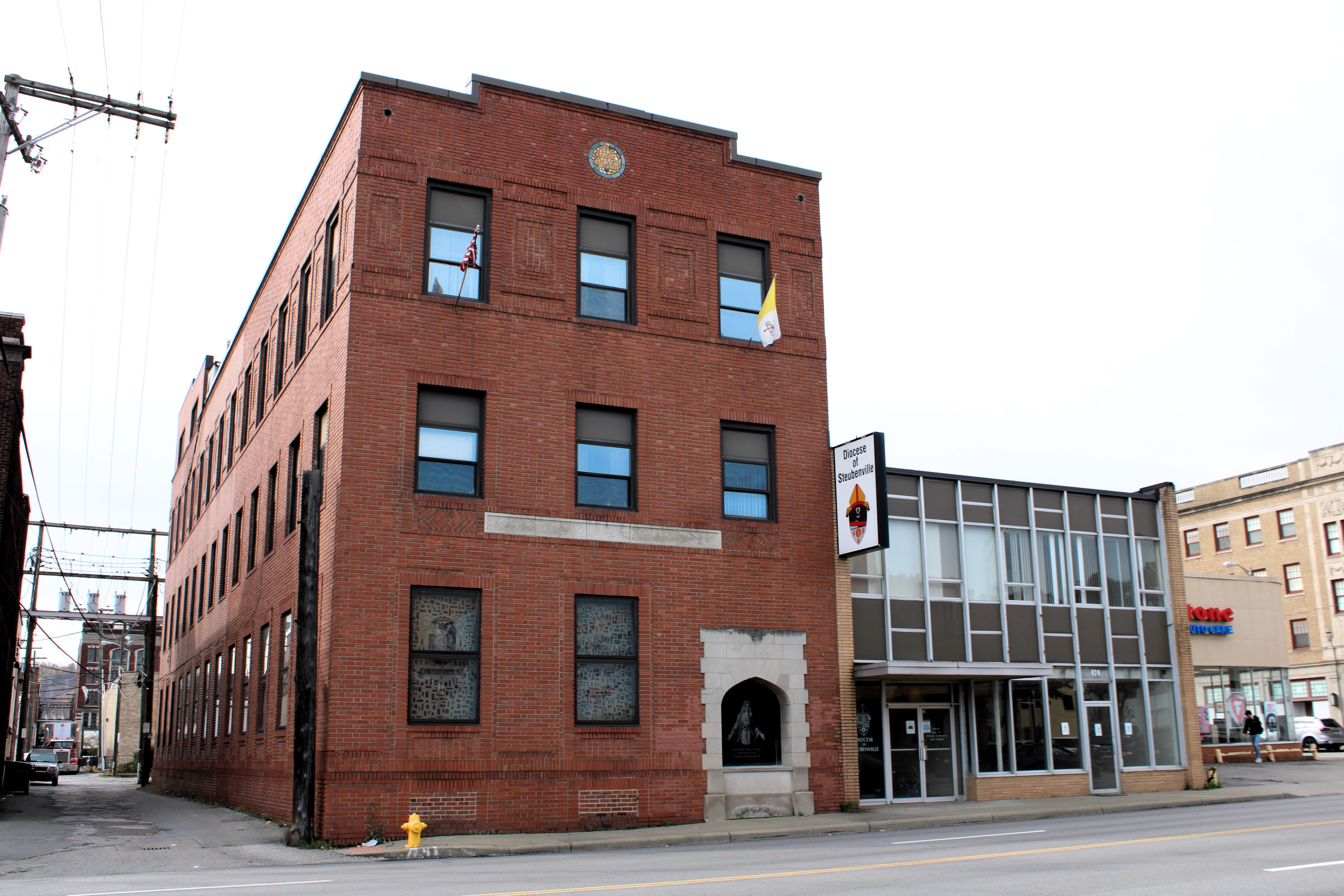
Diocesan Pastoral Center, Steubenville, Ohio (2023)

=== 2000 to 2020 ===
Sheldon retired as bishop of Steubenville in 2002; John Paul II appointed Daniel Conlon of Cincinnati as Sheldon's replacement. Conlon transferred to the Diocese of Joliet in 2011. Jeffrey Monforton replaced him in Steubenville in 2011.

In June 2013, Monforton announced that the diocese would retain its cathedral and renovate it. His plan included upgrading technology to allow the broadcast of masses and other events, installing security systems to allow 24-hour visitation and restoring the towers that had been removed in a 1957 renovation. Monforton added that the diocese try to employ local residents and firms to perform the work. The diocese would also partner with Holy Trinity Greek Orthodox Church, the Public Library of Steubenville and Jefferson County to revitalize the cathedral neighborhood. The diocese closed Holy Name in 2014 in anticipation of its renovation.

In May 2018, the diocese discovered that its financial department had been misallocating funds from employee paychecks since 2004. Monforton had started a forensic audit of the diocesan finances, dating back to 2004. The audit showed that the diocese owed $3.1 million to the Internal Revenue Service and $400,000 to tax authorities in Ohio. Monforton then enacted austerity measures that stabilized the diocese's financial standing. Vicar General Kurt Kemo resigned from his church positions; he pleaded guilty in April 2021 to felony theft charges, having stolen over $289,000 from the diocese.

=== 2020 to present ===
The diocese announced in May 2022 that it was suspending renovation work on Holy Name Cathedral. Monforton stated that the local economy was in too poor shape to support fundraising. In addition, the diocese no longer had the funds to contribute to the project. As of 2026, Holy Name Cathedral remains closed.

In October 2022, the diocese announced that the Vatican was considering merging it with the Diocese of Columbus. A month later, after receiving significant negative feedback within the Diocese of Steubenville, Monforton announced that he was putting the proposal on hold.

In September 2023, Pope Francis appointed Monforton as auxiliary bishop of Detroit. Paul J. Bradley, bishop emeritus of Kalamazoo, was appointed apostolic administrator of Steubenville. Working with Bishop Earl K. Fernandes of the Diocese of Columbus, Bradley released a Summary of Findings in March 2024 on a possible merger of the two dioceses to Archbishop Dennis M. Schnurr of Cincinnati and to the Apostolic Nunciature of the United States in Washington, D.C.

In June 2024, Bishop Edward M. Lohse of Kalamazoo replaced Bradley as apostolic administrator. In a March 2025 press conference, Lohse said that the demographic trends in the Steubenville area and the financial state of its diocese would necessitate a merger with another diocese within the next five years.

=== Sexual abuse ===
In October 2018, the Diocese of Steubenville published a list of 16 clergy and one seminarian who were either credibly accused of, or had admitted to, sexually abusing minors.

In November 2018, Henry Foxhoven, a priest in Glouster, pleaded guilty to three counts of sexual battery of a 17-year-old girl. Foxhoven was sentenced to 12 years in prison with no early release. In June 2020, the Vatican defrocked Foxhoven. In January 2021, Monforton and the diocese were sued for $1 million by Foxhoven's victim. The plaintiff, listed as JW, said that Foxhoven impregnated her in 2017 when she was a young teenager attending his church.

Also in November 2018, a woman reported to the diocese that she had been raped multiple times between 2010 and 2013 at a Franciscan University of Steubenville facility by David Morrier, a Franciscan priest. Morrier impregnated her in 2011. After hearing the allegations, the diocese immediately notified law enforcement; Franciscan University had suspended Morrier from ministry in 2015 after receiving sexual misconduct allegations. In November 2021, Morrier was indicted on sexual battery and rape charges. He pleaded guilty in March 2022 to one count of sexual battery and was sentenced to five years of probation. The woman sued Franciscan University and the Franciscan Order; she reached a financial settlement with them in October 2022.

== Bishops ==
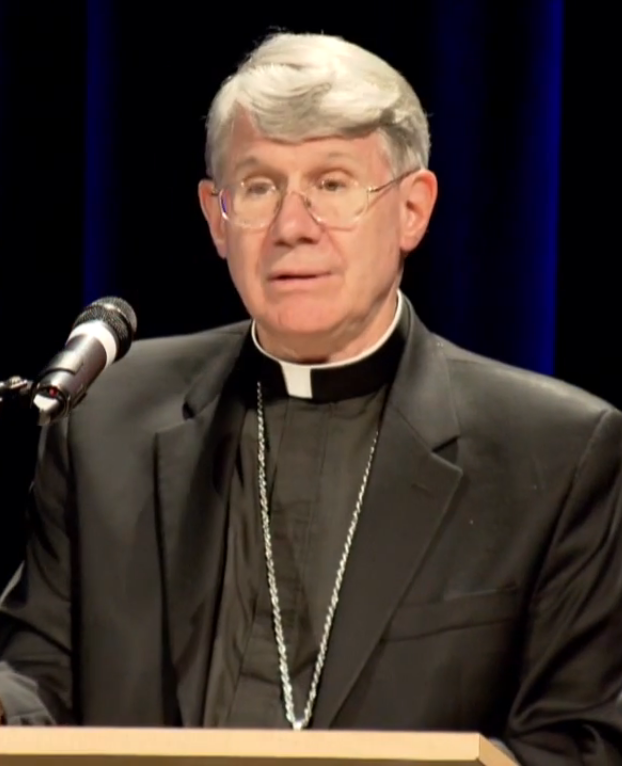
Bishop Conlon (2015)

- Anthony John King Mussio (1945–1977)
- Albert Henry Ottenweller (1977–1992)
- Gilbert Ignatius Sheldon (1992–2002)
- Robert Daniel Conlon (2002–2011), appointed Bishop of Joliet in Illinois
- Jeffrey Marc Monforton (2012–2023)
  - Paul J. Bradley (administrator, 2023–2024)
  - Edward M. Lohse (administrator, 2024)

=== Other diocesan priests who became bishops ===
Roger Joseph Foys, appointed Bishop of Covington in 2002

== Education ==
=== High schools ===
- Steubenville Catholic Central High School – Steubenville
- St. Joseph Central High School – Ironton

=== Universities ===
- Franciscan University of Steubenville – Steubenville

== Catholic radio serving the diocese ==
- WILB "Living Bread Radio" 1060 AM in Canton
