= Singapore Unbound =

Singapore Unbound is a New York City-based non-profit literary arts organization dedicated to freedom of expression and equal rights for all in Singapore and abroad. It organizes cultural events and publishes books through the Gaudy Boy press. The organization is led by its founder and noted Singaporean author Jee Leong Koh.

Every other year, the organization hosts the Singapore Literary Festival in New York City, which celebrates the work of Singaporean authors and connects the literary community in the United States and to that in Singapore. There is also often a theater component to the festival. Singapore Unbound has partnered with New York University and the Asian American Writers’ Workshop to put on the event in the past. In between festivals, Singapore Unbound hosts the Second Saturdays Reading Series, a monthly event that consists of a featured writer, an open reading, and a potluck. Past writers include Vijay Seshadri, Madeleine Thien, Min Jin Lee, Gina Apostol, Dale Peck, Monique Truong, Jericho Brown, Naomi Novik, Chinelo Okparanta, Martha Cooley, Dan Feng Tan, Amanda Lee Koe, and Jeremy Tiang.

The Singapore Unbound Fellowship awards a writer from Singapore a two week residency in New York City and an honorarium once a year. Previous winners include Nur Sabrina Binte Dzulkifli, Jason Soo, and Ally Chua.

In addition to community building efforts, the organization strongly advocates for freedom of expression through protests and written work.

Singapore Unbound has also organized a relief fund for writers in Singapore during the Covid-19 pandemic in 2020.
