= Franciscan University of Steubenville =

Catholic university in Steubenville, Ohio, US

Coordinates: 40°22′38″N 80°37′14″W

- Former names: College of Steubenville (1946–1980); University of Steubenville (1980–1986)
- Motto: Fortitudo et Prudentia
- Motto in English: Fortitude and Prudence
- Type: Private university
- Established: 1946; 80 years ago
- Religious affiliation: Roman Catholic (Third Order Regular Franciscans)
- Academic affiliations: AFCU, ACCU, NAICU, CIC
- Chairman: Joseph Lehman
- President: Dave Pivonka, TOR
- Students: 3,962 (fall 2024)
- Undergraduates: 3,205 (fall 2024)
- Postgraduates: 757 (fall 2024)
- Location: Steubenville, Ohio, U.S.
- Campus: Suburban
- Colors: Green & gold
- Nickname: Barons
- Sporting affiliations: NCAA Division III – PAC
- Mascot: Baron von Steuben
- Website: franciscan.edu
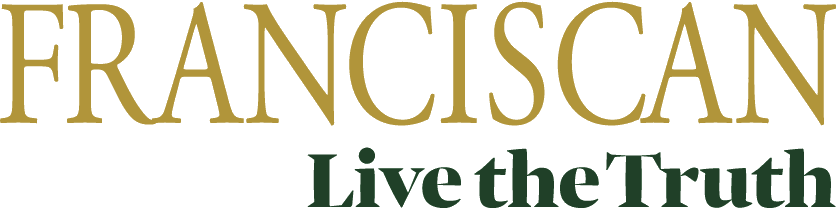

Franciscan University of Steubenville is a private Franciscan university in Steubenville, Ohio, United States. As of fall 2025, the university enrolled approximately 4,250 students in 40 undergraduate and 8 graduate degree programs.

The school was established as the "College of Steubenville" in 1946 by the Franciscan Friars of the Third Order Regular at the request of Anthony John King Mussio, the first bishop of the Diocese of Steubenville. In 1974, Michael Scanlan became president and began a series of major reforms to restore the school to its Catholic heritage. The college changed its name to the "University of Steubenville" upon achieving university status in 1980 and adopted the current title Franciscan University of Steubenville in 1986.

== History ==
In 1946, the first Bishop of Steubenville, Anthony John King Mussio, invited the Franciscan Friars of the Third Order Regular to establish a Catholic college in the diocese to serve local students and especially World War II veterans. In June 1946, the friars accepted the offer, purchased the Knights of Pythias Building in downtown Steubenville, and invested $350,000 in establishing the College of Steubenville. Enrollment grew, and more buildings were purchased, but the college was still cramped. The friars bought a 40-acre property overlooking the city, and accreditation was provided by the North Central Association of Colleges and Schools in 1960.

The College of Steubenville was successful during the early years, under the tenures of presidents Daniel W. Egan, Kevin R. Keelan, and Columba J. Devlin. By the end of Keelan's second term in 1974, the school was suffering from social upheaval and declining enrollment. For some time, it looked like the college would close. Michael Scanlan was chosen to fill the position of president. Incorporating knowledge from his experience in starting a charismatic renewal movement at St. Francis Seminary, Scanlan worked to institute a similar renewal at Steubenville. He took over the Sunday liturgy on the campus, incorporating charismatic praise and worship and more passionate preaching into the Mass. He instituted households, small groups of men and women devoted to personal and communal growth, and required students to join one. Scanlan also created a renewal center on the campus, which organized retreats and seminars to further instruct students in the Roman Catholic faith. The center began holding religious conferences in the summers, one benefit of which was attracting many young people to the college. Scanlan often spoke at these conferences.

Even with these changes, the college struggled to stay open. The first year after Scanlan instituted the changes, the incoming freshman class was the smallest in the college's history. Five of the top administrators at the college left or were dismissed, and the remaining faculty expressed discontentment with Scanlan's leadership. Despite this, Scanlan continued to make changes, especially to the curriculum. Scanlan reintroduced a theology program, which quickly became the top major at the college, and also oversaw the development of graduate programs in business and theology, which helped the college obtain the title of university in 1980. In addition, the nursing program rose to higher distinction. It was chartered by the state government of Ohio in 1984 and then received accreditation from the National League of Nursing in 1985.

Scanlan orchestrated many other changes at the university. He instituted an Oath of Fidelity to the Magisterium, which was required of the theology professors at the university. Under his guidance, the undergraduate theology program became the largest of any Catholic university in America. He also created the Human Life Studies minor, the only one of its kind in America. By 2000, Scanlan's leadership and changes had helped the university to increase dramatically in size; there were more than 2,100 students, nearly double the number in the early 1970s.

The university was granted an exemption from Title IX in 2014 that allows it to legally discriminate against LGBT students.

In 2022, David Morrier, a Franciscan friar who served as a campus minister until his removal in 2014, was sentenced to probation after being pleading guilty to sexual battery of a student whom he had been counseling, which took place over three years, from 2010 to 2013.

=== List of presidents and chancellors ===
President	Tenure	Chancellor	Tenure
Daniel W. Egan	1946–1959	(none)	1946–2000
Kevin R. Keelan	1959–1962	(none)	1946–2000
Columba J. Devlin	1962–1969	(none)	1946–2000
Kevin R. Keelan	1969–1974	(none)	1946–2000
Michael Scanlan	1974–2000	(none)	1946–2000
Terence Henry	2000–2013	Michael Scanlan	2000–2011
Sean O. Sheridan	2013–2019	Terence Henry	2013–present
David Pivonka	2019–present	Terence Henry	2013–present

== Campus ==
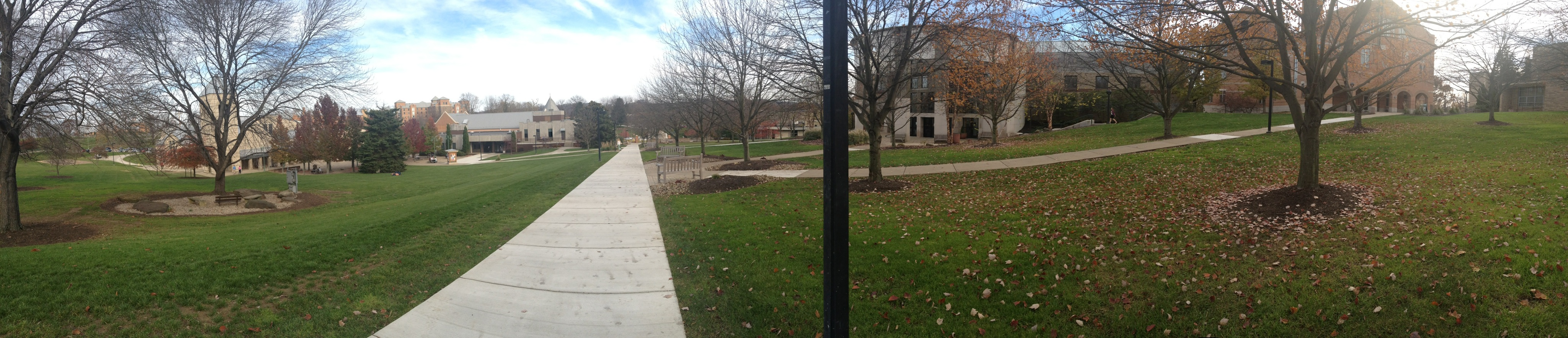
A panorama photo of the campus

The academic buildings on campus include Christ the Teacher Hall, Egan Hall, Stafford Hall (attached to Egan Hall), Saints Cosmas and Damian Hall, and the Saint Joseph Center. Some classes are held in Saint Junipero Serra Hall, which also serves as a residence hall.

Christ the Teacher Hall is the newest and largest academic hall. It houses engineering on the ground floor which include engineering labs. Business on the first floor, and Nursing on the second floor with a state of the art nursing simulation lab. A chapel, conference center, and “The Well” cafe serving sandwiches, salads, coffee, and more are also located on the first floor, and admissions, Registrar’s office, and Financial Aid are located on the ground floor.

Egan Hall houses classrooms, a theater, television and radio studios, special laboratories for the education and psychology departments, and computer workstations on each floor.

In Stafford Hall (attached to Egan Hall), there are classrooms, and offices, on the first floor, and faculty offices on the second floor.

Saints Cosmas and Damian Hall, the main science building, houses biology and chemistry laboratories, classrooms, the campus' largest lecture hall, and two computer science labs equipped with advanced software for programming.

The Saint Joseph Center houses some administrative offices as well as The Sacred Music Program, Social Work, Criminal Justice, and the Clinical Mental Health Program

Starvaggi Hall is the main administrative building on campus housing many departments including Information Technology, and Career Services.

The St. John Paul II Library's collection includes more than 230,000 books and bound periodicals, and more than 390 current periodicals. The OPAL Catalog and OhioLINK Network provide access to many research databases and more than 7 million books and journals.

There are 16 residence halls on campus: Solanus Casey Hall, Saint Francis Hall, Trinity Hall, Marian Hall, Saint Thomas More Hall, Saint Louis Hall, Saint Elizabeth Hall, Kolbe Hall, Clare Hall, Padua Hall, Saint Bonaventure Hall, Vianney Hall, Saint Junipero Serra Hall (which also houses classroom facilities), Scotus Hall, and Saint Agnes Hall. Assisi Heights, a small neighborhood of apartments, is also available for upperclassman and graduate student housing.

Antonian Hall is the campus dining hall offering many different options including a salad bar, pizza, “Clean Plate” concept which serves food without the nine main food allergens, and more.

Franciscan University of Steubenville has two soccer fields, a rugby field, a baseball field, and a field designated primarily for intramural sports. In 2007, the university purchased the golf course which borders the main campus from the city of Steubenville for future development. It is currently used by the cross country team for practice.

Christ the King Chapel is the center of the spiritual life of the campus. There are four Masses every weekday while classes are in session, five Masses on Sundays, vespers on Sunday evening, praise & worship every Tuesday, and confessions held at least four times per week. Most Masses are routinely standing room only. The Chapel was expanded and renovated starting at the end of the spring 2024 semester and was reopened prior to the beginning of the fall 2025 semester.

The Portiuncula chapel, a replica of St. Francis' original chapel, sits on the edge of the main campus. It is home to perpetual adoration (at least two students volunteer to be present and adore the Blessed Sacrament during every hour of the week throughout the fall and spring semesters). Outside of this chapel are the Tomb of the Unborn Child, which contains the remains of seven aborted fetuses, a Creche, Stations of the Cross, and Marian Grotto. In 2009, the Vatican designated the Portiuncula as a place of pilgrimage where the faithful can obtain a plenary indulgence on five certain days through the year and under certain conditions of prayer and a detachment from sin.

The J.C. Willams Center is the student center, which houses the Tom and Nina Gentile Gallery containing numerous works of art donated to the university, the University Bookstore,”The Pub”, serving burgers, wraps, and more, and a coffee shop.

The Finnegan Fieldhouse is home to a basketball court, two racquetball courts, a weight room, one room for aerobic classes, a cardiovascular room, and the campus health and counseling center, as well as classrooms.

At the far north end of campus is The Holy Spirit Friary and The Steel Cross. This cross, made of two steel I-beams, is 35 feet tall and visible from afar.

== Academics ==
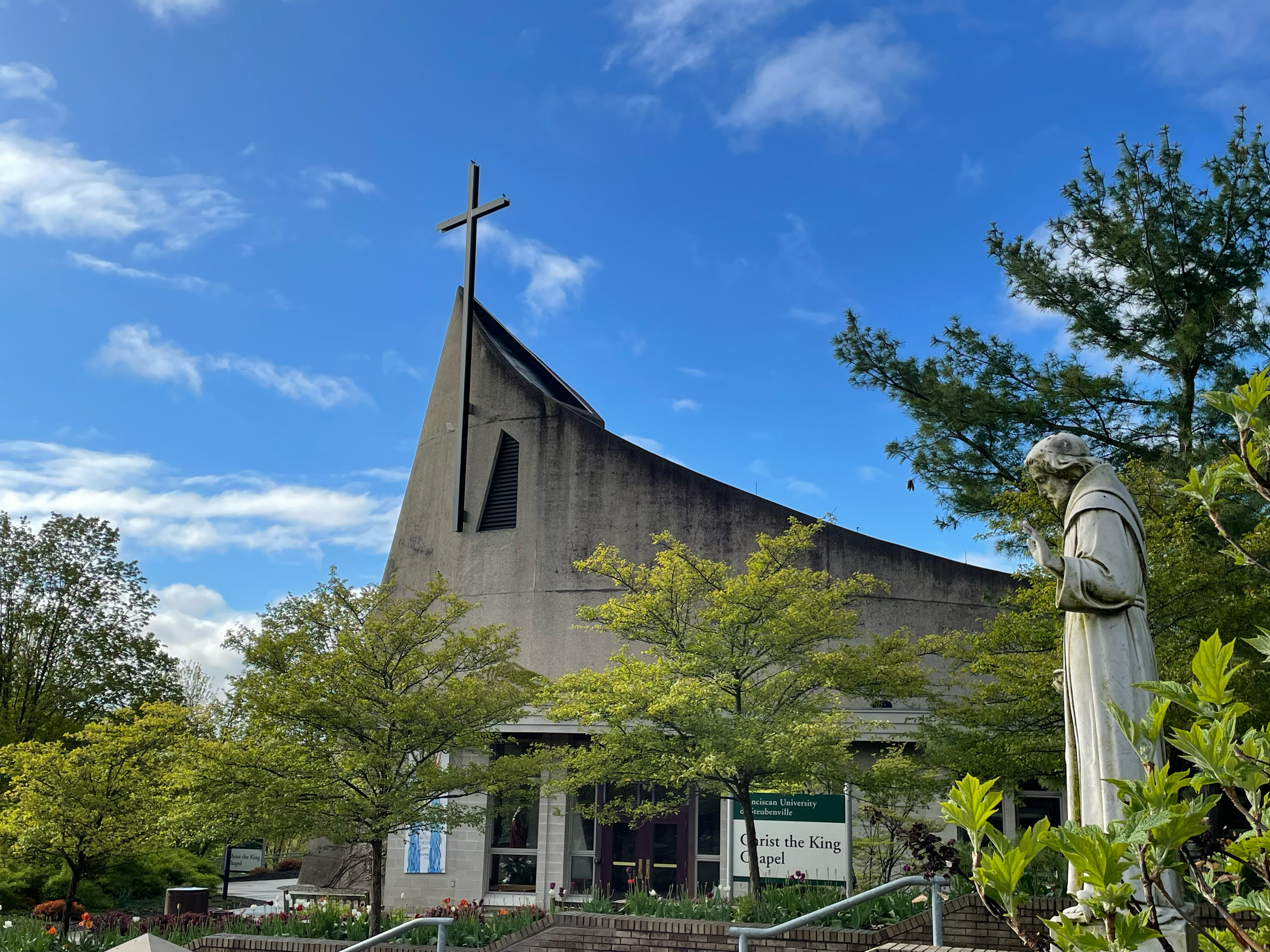
Christ the King Chapel

The university offers 41 majors (seven pre-professional programs), 34 minors, 10 special minor programs (not available as majors), and seven graduate degree programs. The university maintains a 14:1 student-faculty ratio. Undergraduate students need a minimum of 124 credits for graduation. The number of electives varies with each major program. The university operates on the semester system. Three summer sessions also are available.

There is also an honors program in the Great Books of Western Civilization. The Honors Program open to qualified undergraduate students of any major.

The Priestly Discernment Program offers human, academic, spiritual, pastoral and fraternal formation for men considering the Catholic priesthood.

=== Austria study abroad program ===
Since 1991, up to 180 students per semester study at the university's program in Gaming, Austria. The campus is located in a renovated fourteenth-century Carthusian monastery, known as the Gaming Charterhouse, in the foothills of the Austrian Alps. The old monastery serves as a hotel during summer months.

The Austrian Program features a four-day class schedule, Monday through Thursday, so students may spend extended time visiting religious, cultural, and historical sites throughout Europe. The program sponsors trips throughout Europe.

In 2011 Franciscan University launched a summer mini program in Austria. The session lasted from May 21 to June 30, 2011.

=== Partnerships ===
In 2014, Franciscan University introduced a dual-degree undergraduate engineering program, partnering with the University of Notre Dame, Gannon University and University of Dayton to offer an array of different engineering disciplines. Through the dual-degree program, students matriculate into Franciscan's quantitative and liberal arts curriculum for the first two years of undergraduate study and are able to directly transfer into engineering programs at any of the partner schools for an additional two to three years. Upon culmination of the program, the student will obtain a Bachelor of Science or Bachelor of Arts from Franciscan University (contingent on the program and credits elected) and a Bachelor in Science from one of the partner schools.

Franciscan University also offers a "2+2" program in which students can earn an Associate of Science degree in Natural and Applied Science from Franciscan before transferring to another school to complete a Bachelor of Science in engineering.

In 2016, Franciscan University announced an agreement with D'Youville College which created a 3+4 dual degree program between the two schools. Under the current arrangement, undergraduate students may enroll at Franciscan to begin studies in chemistry or biology and, after three years, may transfer directly into a four-year Doctor of Pharmacy program at D'Youville College's School of Pharmacy. Upon completion of the seven-year program, the graduate receives a Bachelor of Science degree from Franciscan and a Doctor of Pharmacy degree from D'Youville.

In 2017, the university entered into a similar articulation agreement with Duquesne University, which grants Franciscan University students preferred admission in the Mylan School of Pharmacy upon completion of an Associate of Arts degree.

The university maintains a partnership with a number of Catholic law schools which allows undergraduate students to complete three years of undergraduate study in Steubenville, then, pending LSAT scores and other admissions criteria, matriculate directly into a three-year Juris Doctor program at either the Catholic University of America School of Law, University of St. Thomas School of Law, Ave Maria School of Law, or the Duquesne University School of Law.

In conjunction with the School of Canon Law at the Catholic University of America in Washington, D.C., Franciscan University offers a course of study that fulfills the requirements for the First Cycle of studies in Canon Law. Graduates of Franciscan University who complete this course of study are allowed to proceed directly to the Licentiate in Canon Law program at the Catholic University of America.

=== Reputation and rankings ===
Academic rankings

Master's
- Washington Monthly: 390

Regional
- U.S. News & World Report: 28

In the 2025 U.S. News & World Report college rankings, Franciscan University of Steubenville was ranked 28th out of 165 regional universities in the Midwest.

=== Academic treatment of homosexuality ===
In 2012 the Social Work curriculum included a course called SWK Deviant Behavior 314, which examined behaviors such as homosexuality. Noting that the Diagnostic and Statistical Manual of Mental Disorders (DSM) had removed homosexuality as an illness, two Franciscan graduates tried to get the course description changed. In a written statement to NPR, the school said, "Franciscan University follows Catholic Church teaching in regard to homosexuality and treats homosexual persons with 'respect, compassion, and sensitivity' ... while holding homosexual acts as 'intrinsically disordered.' " In an interview with Inside Higher Ed, university vice president Daniel Kempton stated, "that principles of academic freedom apply to the course and that the view that homosexuality is deviant is a legitimate perspective for the course."

== Student life ==
Originally, campus life consisted of fraternities and sororities starting at Franciscans' founding in 1946. Under the leadership of Father Michael Scanlan, households (small groups of men and women devoted to personal and communal growth) were instituted and a once prominent Greek life began to disappear, ending in 2016 when the final chapters, Theta Phi Alpha and Alpha Phi Delta were excluded from campus life. Though not recognized by the school, Alpha Phi Delta a nationally recognized fraternity, has remained active (as of 2019).

Instead, students are encouraged to join in faith households, groups of three or more students of the same sex, whose members study, recreate, and pray with one another. These student groups are attached to a particular residence hall on campus with a meeting space or common room within the hall where they hold their commitments or spend time together in community. Household members can apply to live “on wing” (the part of the residence hall where the common room is located) during housing periods. These households are centered around particular devotions or charismatic gifts. As of March 2015, there were 24 men's households and 26 women's households. In 2024, Franciscan University celebrated 50 years of household life on campus.

The campus is known for its liturgies, retreats, and spiritual talks. Most students make a weekly commitment to Eucharistic adoration in the Portiuncula chapel, and Masses are well-attended. Masses have standing room only, even on weekdays.

There is a 28-member student government.

== Athletics ==
=== Varsity ===
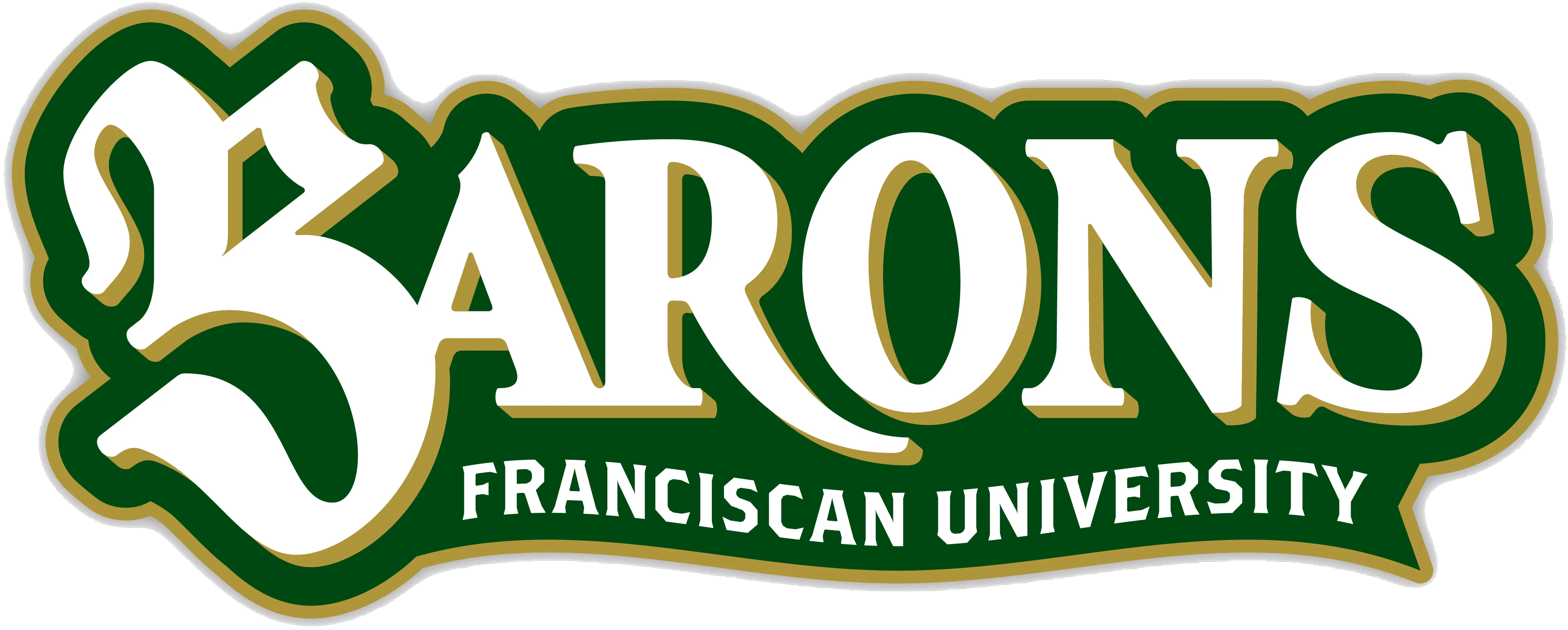
Franciscan athletics wordmark

Men's sports	Women's sports
Baseball	Basketball
Basketball	Cross country
Cross country	Golf
Lacrosse	Lacrosse
Rugby	Soccer
Soccer	Softball
Tennis	Swimming
Track and field^{1}	Tennis
	Track and field^{1}
	Volleyball
^{1} – includes both indoor and outdoor

The university sponsors 20 sports, nine for men and eleven for women. The athletics teams, nicknamed the Barons, compete in NCAA Division III as members of the Presidents' Athletic Conference (PAC) after completing a transition from the Allegheny Mountain Collegiate Conference in July 2020.

The Barons started their PAC transition by joining for men's and women's lacrosse in 2018–19. For 2019–20, Franciscan added women's golf, plus indoor and outdoor track & field for both men and women, to its PAC membership. Finally, the school became a full PAC member in 2020–21.

The mascot of the university's sports teams is Baron von Steuben, modeled after Prussian military officer Baron Friedrich Wilhelm von Steuben.

The men's rugby team is a member of the National Collegiate Rugby and competes in the Allegheny Rugby Union Conference. In 2001 Franciscan became the second college in the nation, of any division, to have a varsity rugby club. In July 2011, Franciscan signed a three-year sponsorship agreement with Adidas. In 2025, they won the program’s first National Championship in their 25th year with a 29-17 win over Slippery Rock University.

=== Club sports ===
In the 2024–25 school year, the university offered men's volleyball, equestrian, men's and women's ultimate frisbee, and fencing as club sports.

=== Intramurals ===
The university offers intramural sports throughout the academic year. The main sports played include sand volleyball, indoor volleyball, flag football, and 5 on 5 basketball. Other leagues throughout the year include kickball, badminton, Spikeball, softball, futsal, and dodgeball.

== Notable alumni ==
- Andrew Bremberg – Former Permanent Representative of the United States of America to the Office of the United Nations and Other International Organizations in Geneva
- Donald Calloway – Catholic author and priest
- Jeff Cavins – Catholic evangelist, author, and biblical scholar
- Trent Horn – Catholic apologist, writer, and academic
- Regina Doman – Catholic fiction writer
- Jason Evert – Founder of the Chastity Project, Totus Tuus Press, and prominent chastity speaker
- Jeff Fortenberry – Politician and economist who served in the United States House of Representatives from 2005 to 2022, representing Nebraska's 1st congressional district
- Roger Joseph Foys – Bishop of Covington, Kentucky
- Michael Gielen – Bishop of Christchurch, New Zealand
- Gintaras Grušas – Archbishop of Vilnius, Lithuania
- Jonathan Morris – Contributor and analyst for the Fox News Channel
- Stuart Long – Catholic priest
- Michael Rodak, Jr. – Clerk of the Supreme Court of the United States
- Cornelius Sim – Cardinal and bishop of Brunei
- Anna Song – California politician
- Princess Alexandra of Luxembourg
- Prince Sebastian of Luxembourg
