= 7th National Eucharistic Congress (United States) =

1935 Catholic event in Cleveland

Seventh National Eucharistic Congress
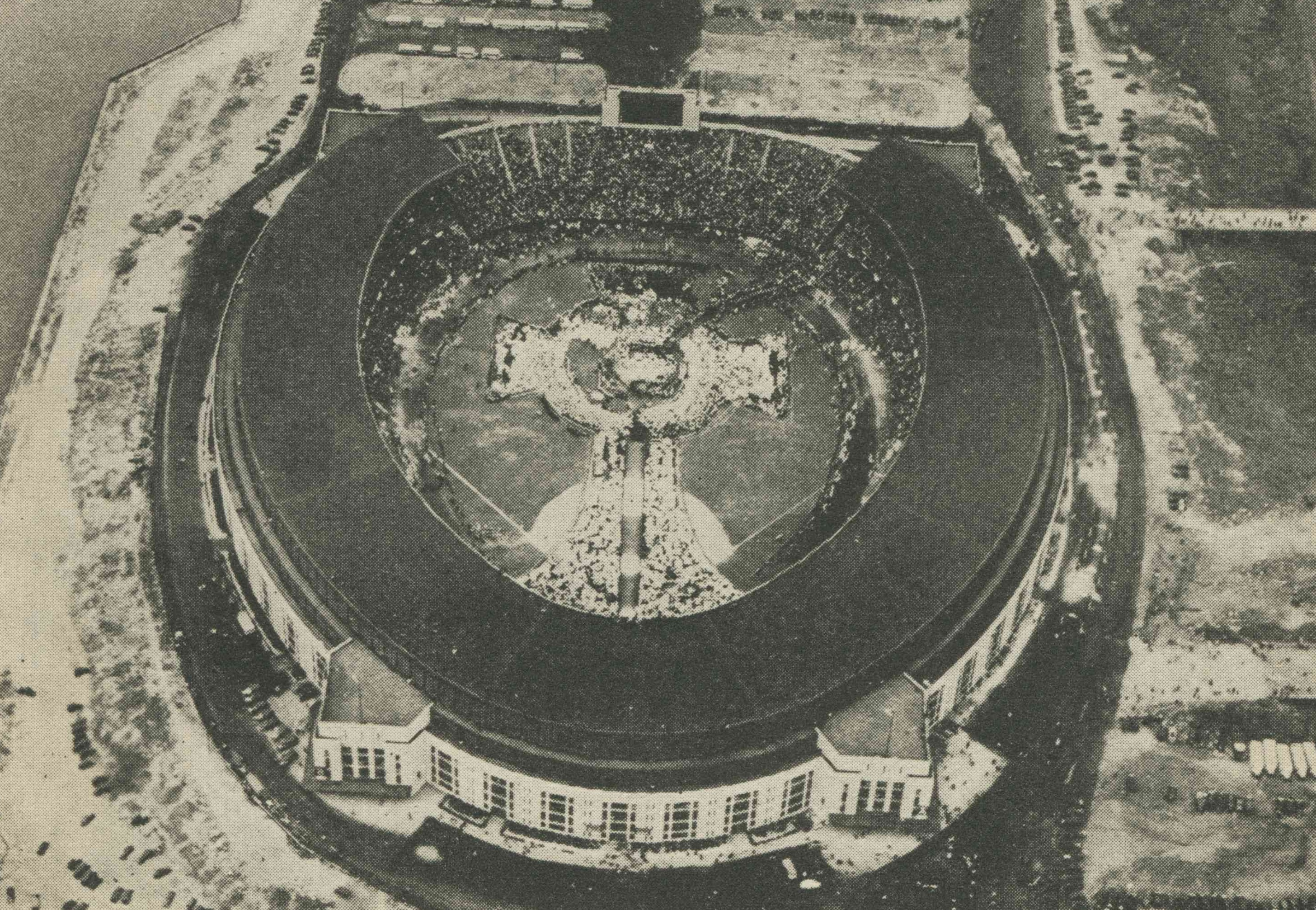
- Cleveland Stadium with a human monstrance inside on the final day of the Congress.
- Date: September 23–26, 1935
- Duration: 4 days
- Venue: St. John's Cathedral; Cleveland Stadium; Cleveland Public Auditorium
- Location: Cleveland
- Type: Eucharistic congress
- Theme: The Holy Eucharist, The Source and Inspiration of Catholic Action
- Participants: 500,000
- Papal legate: Patrick Hayes

The Seventh National Eucharistic Congress was a Roman Catholic event that took place from September 23 to 26, 1935, in Cleveland, Ohio, at multiple venues including the Cathedral of St. John the Evangelist, the Cleveland Public Auditorium, and Cleveland Municipal Stadium. The multi-day event, meant to encourage devotion to the Sacrament of the Eucharist, was hosted by the Diocese of Cleveland under the leadership of Archbishop Joseph Schrembs. Around 360,000 people were estimated to have participated in the final ceremonies.

== Background ==
The first International Eucharistic Congress owed its inspiration to Bishop Gaston de Ségur, and was held at Lille, France, on June 21, 1881. The initial inspiration behind the idea came from the laywoman Marie-Marthe-Baptistine Tamisier who lobbied clergy following the French Revolution in an effort to restore religiosity and Eucharistic devotion to France. In 1879, Pope Leo XIII established a committee to plan the first international Eucharistic congress. In the wake of these international congresses, national congresses sprung up in the United States. Prior to the 1935 event, there were six other National Eucharistic Congresses in the United States, as well as one international congress.

Following the Sixth National Congress in Omaha in 1930, the episcopate of the United States decided to set a planned schedule of Congresses and appointed Joseph Schrembs as the Promoter of National Eucharistic Congresses in the United States, as well as deciding on 1935 as the date of the next Congress.

Devotion to the practice of Eucharistic adoration had been brought to the Cleveland area by John Neumann during his missionary journeys in Ohio prior to his consecration as Bishop of Philadelphia in 1852.

=== Preparation ===
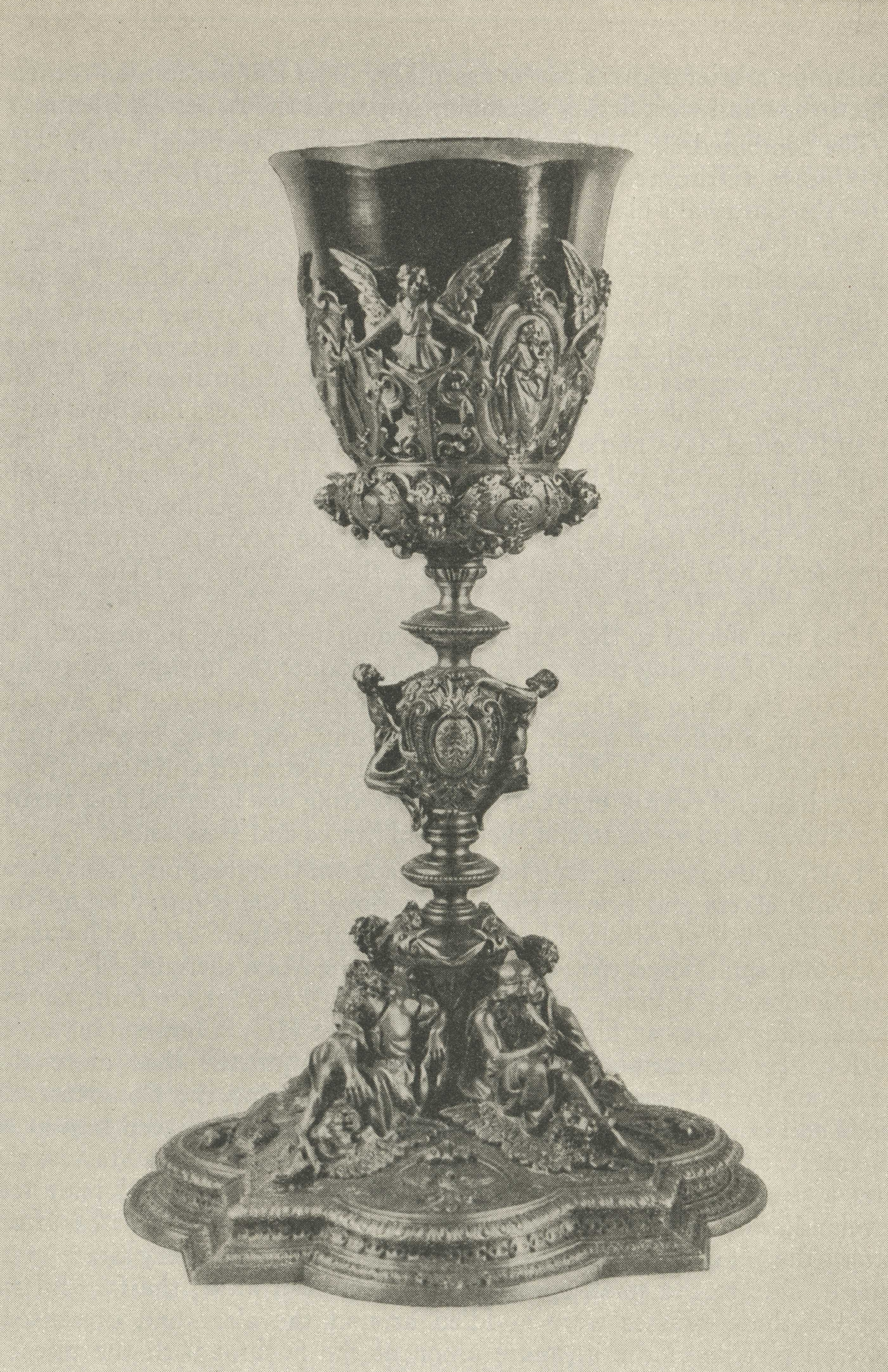
The chalice given by Pope Pius XI to the congress

Floyd Begin, then a monsignor of the diocese of Cleveland and secretary of Joseph Schrembs, led the committee planning the congress. The pastor of St. Aloysius' Church, Francis Zwilling, was in charge of finding lodging for 25,000 lay visitors in private homes. The steamer Seeandbee—later renovated into the aircraft carrier USS Wolverine during World War II—was used to house around 842 people. Many choirs were prepared by priest and seminary professor Francis Johns, including a women's chorus of 7,000, a children's chorus of 10,000, a men's choir of 3,000, a boy's choir of 300, and a clerical choir of 300.

The official theme of the congress was "The Holy Eucharist, The Source and Inspiration of Catholic Action." Pope Pius XI, through his private secretary Diego Venini, sent a chalice for use at the congress.

One hundred and twenty-eight altars, each representing one of the existing dioceses in the United States at the time, were set up in the Exposition Hall. Each altar was decorated with a plaque containing the bishop's ecclesiastical coat of arms, with a history of the diocese hung on the back of the altar.

== Congress ==
=== September 23 ===
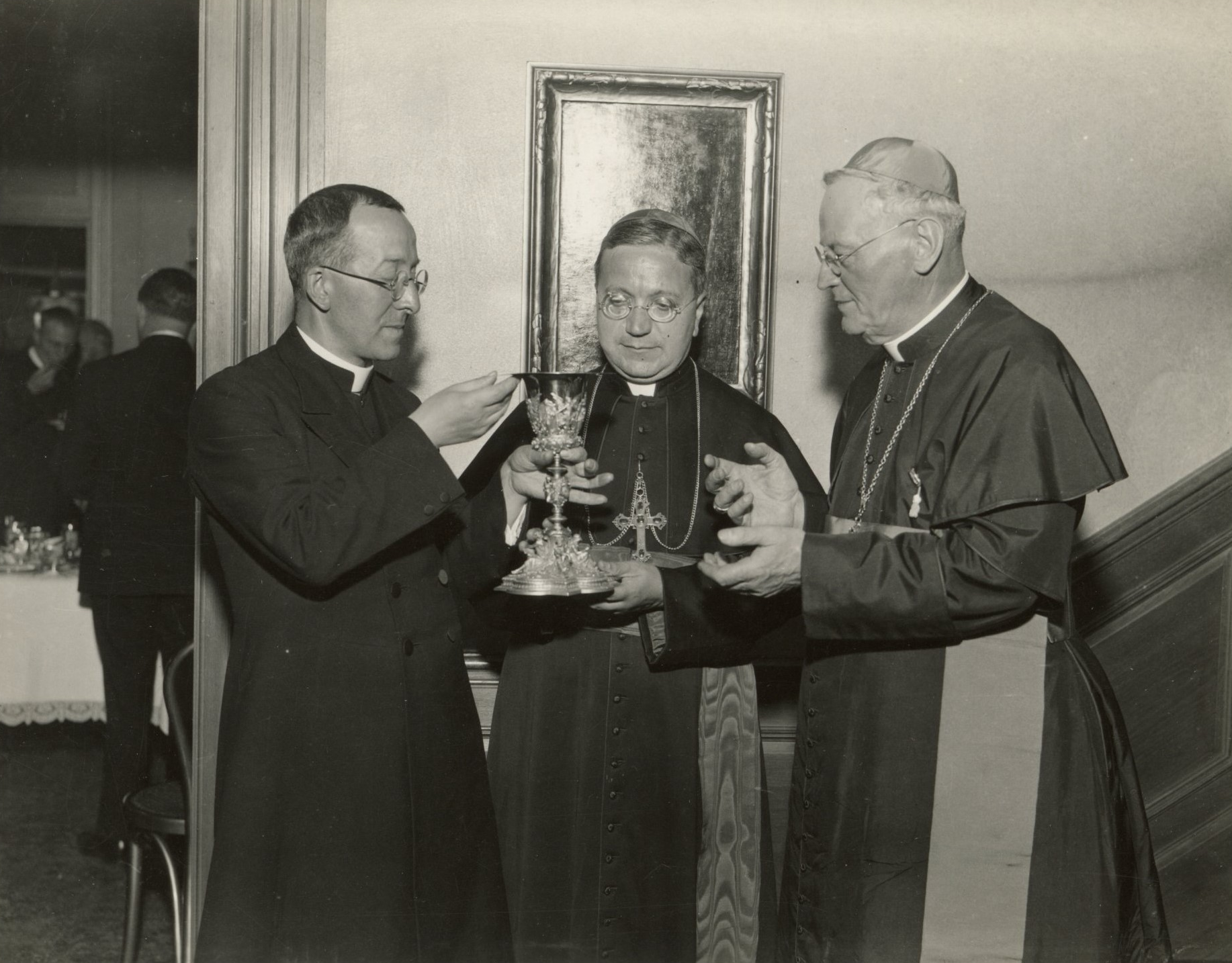
Diego Venini presents Bishop Schrembs with the chalice from the Pope

The papal legate, Patrick Cardinal Hayes, arrived at Terminal Tower at noon via train on September 23. An automobile procession consisting of Hayes, Diego Venini, Joseph Schrembs, Al Smith and others proceeded to St. John's Cathedral; tens of thousands lined the streets. A ceremonial welcome of the papal legate followed inside the cathedral.

A civic reception followed in the evening. Civil dignitaries present included mayor of Cleveland Harry Davis, governor of Ohio Martin Davey, and James Farley, United States Postmaster General, who represented Franklin D. Roosevelt. Roosevelt sent a message to the congress, stating "without [religion], no nation can long endure ... your conference plays its part, therefore, in a great and vital mission for the well-being of the nation."

=== September 24 ===
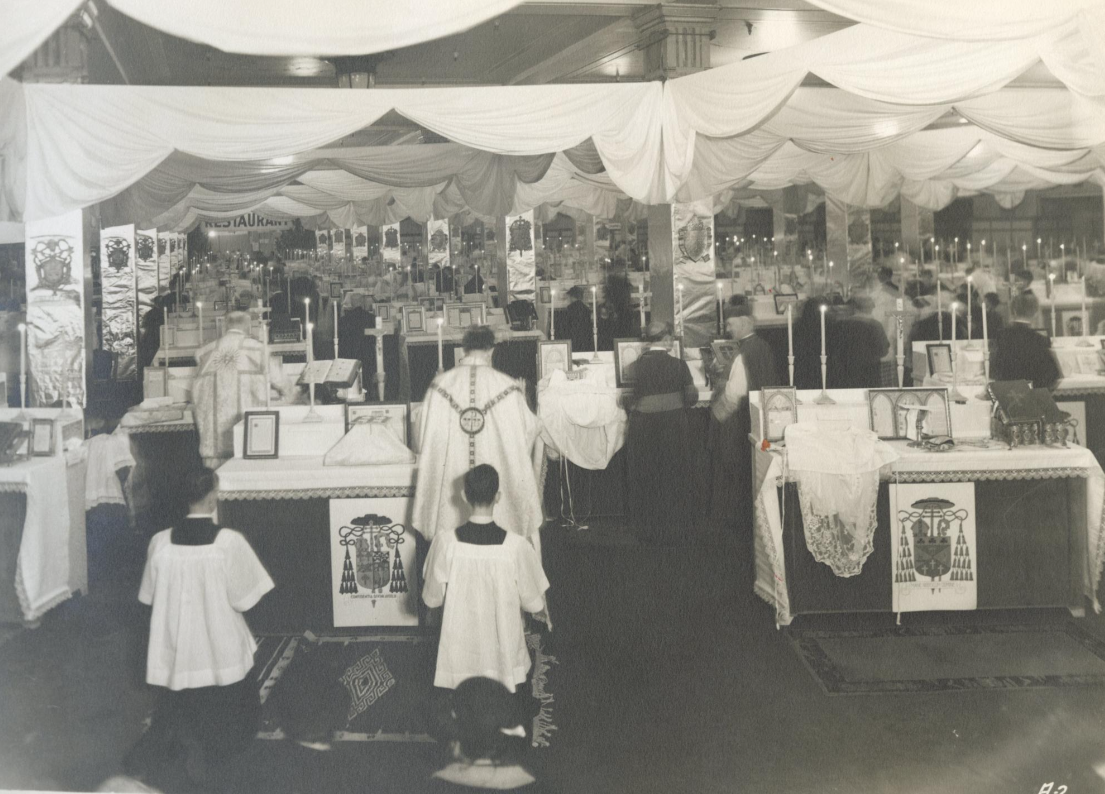
The Hall of Altars featuring an altar for each American diocese

On the morning of September 24, a Mass celebrated in the Cleveland Public Auditorium included a choir of 3,000 local Catholics and a sermon preached by archbishop John McNicholas, OP of the Archdiocese of Cincinnati.

Cardinal Hayes, in opening remarks, stated that the auditorium is transformed into the Upper Room during the congress; he expressed his hope that through the prayers of the congress, "the menacing clouds of war may be dissipated by the radiant splendor of the Prince of Peace."

Amleto Cicognani, apostolic delegate to the United States, (Note: Formal diplomatic relations between the United States and the Holy See were not established until 1984; until then, the Pope's representative in the United States was called an "apostolic delegate" rather than the current "papal nuncio". Further reading: Apostolic Nunciature to the United States) spoke to the congress' meeting of priests, stating that a priest much be a "bridge divinely built to join earth to heaven." He also encouraged priests to pray, stating that "to live as a Christian does not mean to recall simply the pages of the Gospel ... but to effectuate an intimate union with Christ from Whom we may secure the means and strength to do good and overcome evil." Other sectional talks were held for religious sisters, college men and women, nurses, journalists, and those in public service.

A dinner in honor of Cardinal Hayes was held at Hotel Cleveland. Raymond Kearney, auxiliary bishop of Brooklyn and at the time the youngest bishop in the world at age 33, gave a toast to Pope Pius XI.

=== September 25 ===
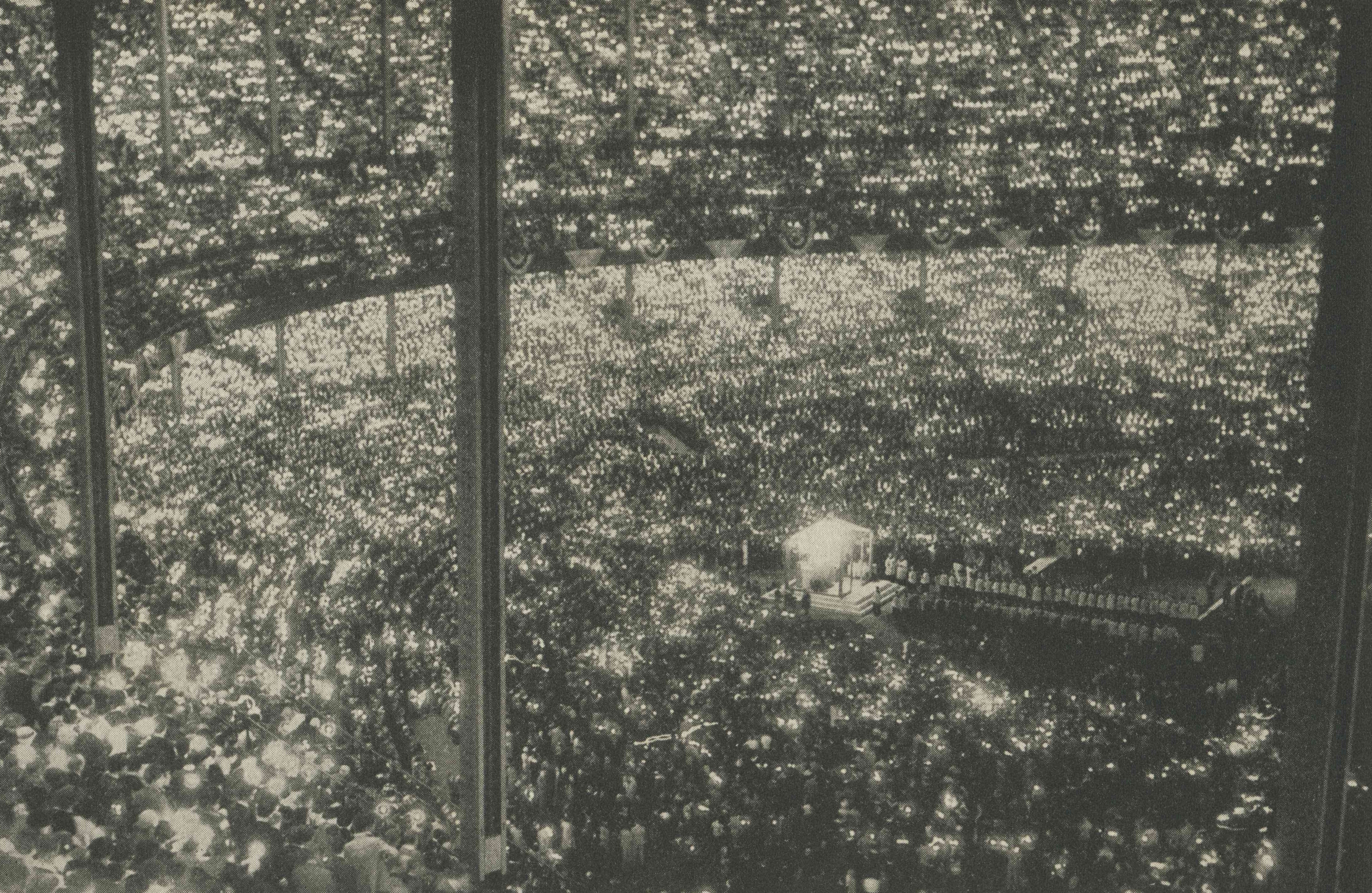
The midnight Mass in Cleveland Stadium

On Wednesday morning, a Solemn Pontifical Mass for children was held at 9:30 am at the Municipal stadium. A Solemn Pontifical Divine Liturgy in the Greek Rite was held at 11:30 am, celebrated by Basil Takach in the Cleveland Auditorium.

Speakers at the Cleveland Stadium on Wednesday included Fulton Sheen and Al Smith, who spoke against atheism and communism. Sectional meetings were held for parents on the topic of education, social service, and professionals.

At 11 pm, an evening program for men began with a Holy Hour in the stadium presided over by bishop Joseph Ritter of Indianapolis. The lower area of the stadium was filled with 40,000 men, with women and children in the upper deck. Searchlights lit up the monstrance with the exposed Eucharist as hymns were sung. The bishop of Amarillo, Robert Lucey, gave a meditation. At midnight, a pontifical low Mass was celebrated by Cardinal Cicognani. For the Mass, all searchlights were extinguished and only candles on the altar and held by those in attendance lit the stadium.

While it had originally been planned that twenty other Masses would be simultaneously celebrated to provide enough Eucharistic hosts for distribution by 500 priests, the crowd was deemed too large to do so and a spiritual communion was encouraged. An estimated 150,000 were in attendance and 25,000 were turned away, according to the stadium commissioner; among those in attendance was Al Smith and his wife Catherine.

=== September 26 ===
Mayor Davis declared the final day of the Congress a public holiday, and many Catholics working in secular institutions in the city were given the day off of work. A Solemn Pontifical Mass for women was celebrated by Joseph Rummel, archbishop of New Orleans, on Thursday morning. With the hall filled to capacity, 40,000 women listened to Rummel praise motherhood and condemn divorce and birth control.

A closing procession was participated in by 20,000 people, beginning at St. John's Cathedral and ending at Cleveland Stadium. Upon arrival at the stadium, the procession was addressed by Pope Pius XI via radio. With 110,000 inside the stadium and 250,000 standing on the streets and shore of Lake Erie, a grand total of 360,000 listened to Pope Pius XI pray for peace in the world and the deprecation of the "unspeakable material and moral havoc of wars and their dire aftermath." After the message, 20,000 people formed a "living monstrance" by standing on the field in the shape of a cruciform ostensorium.

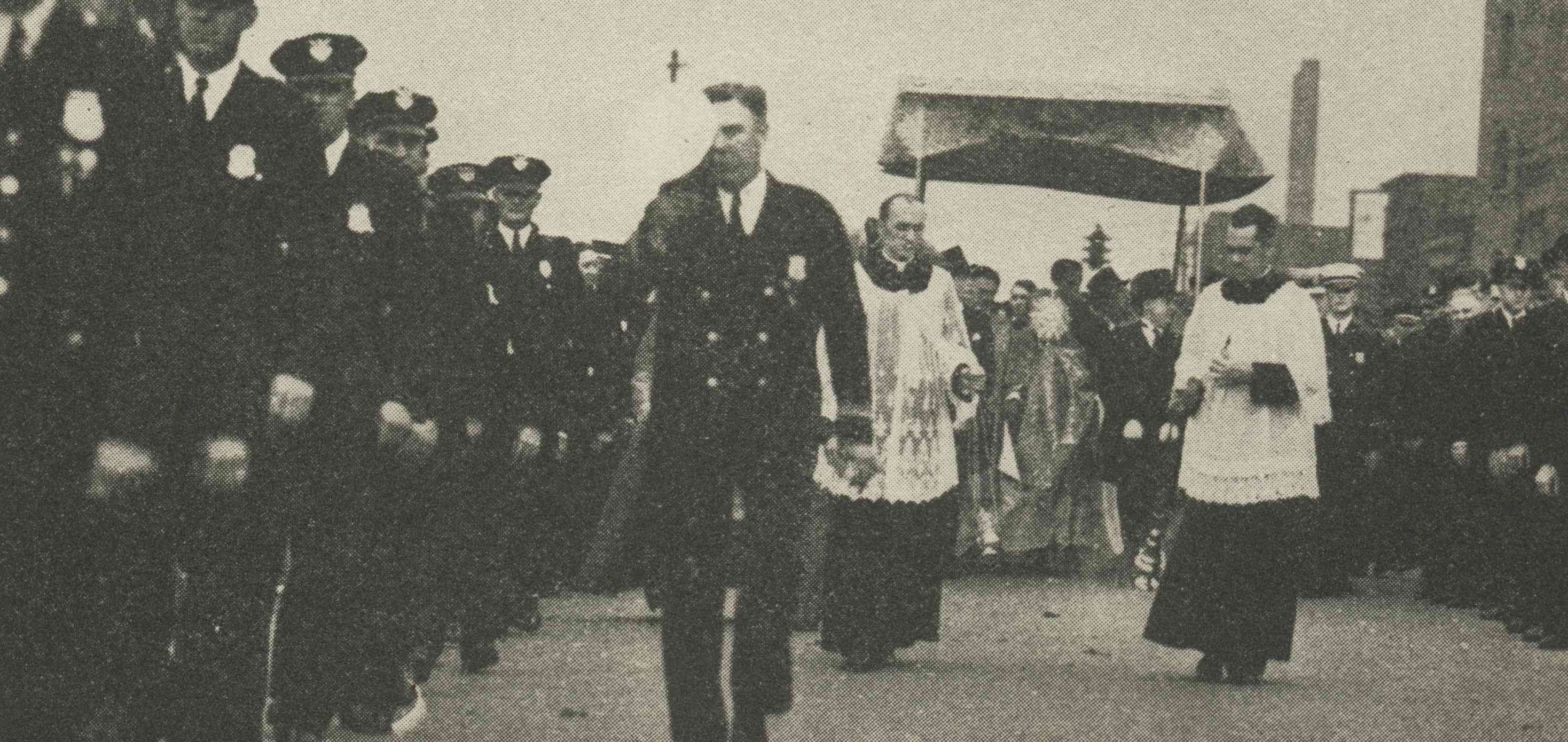
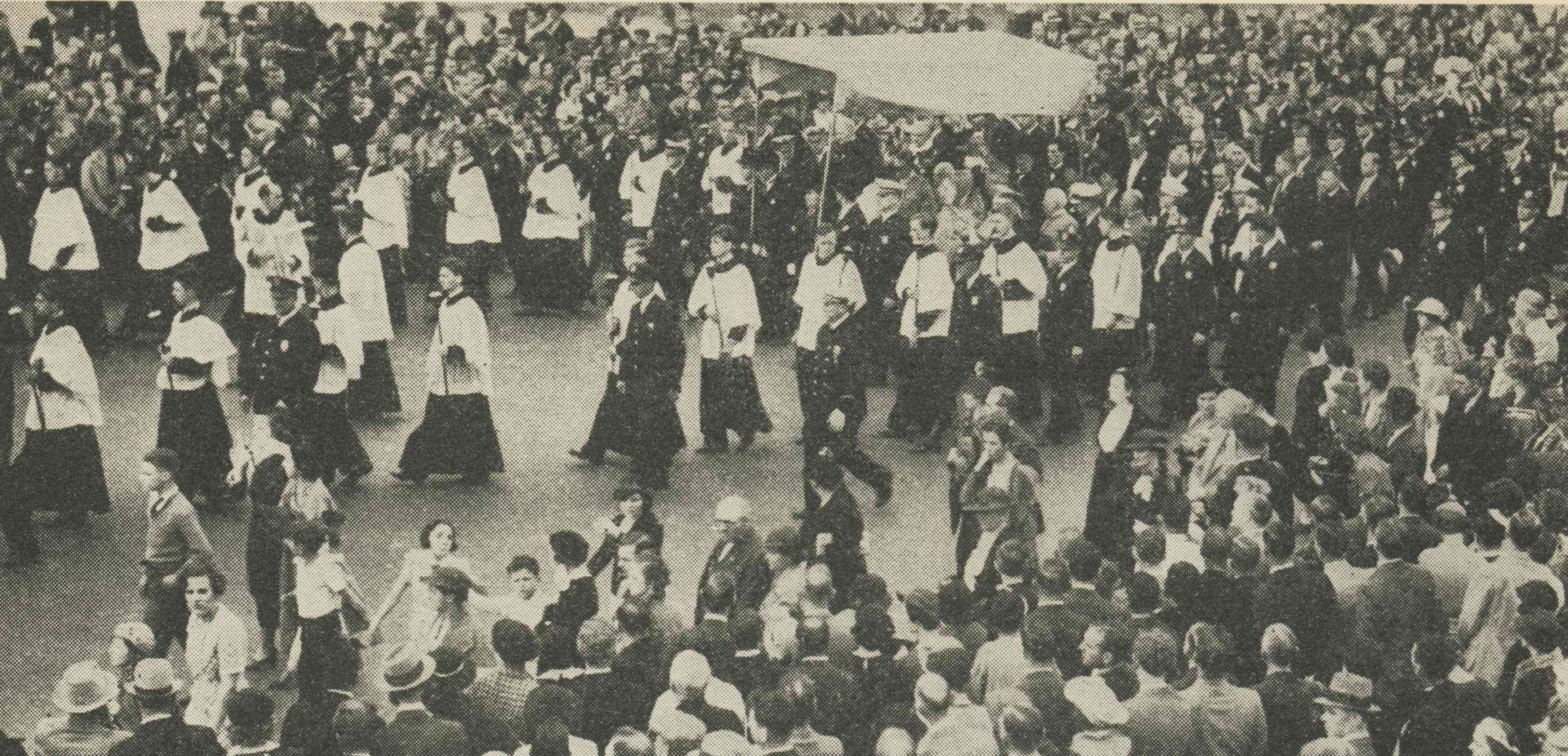
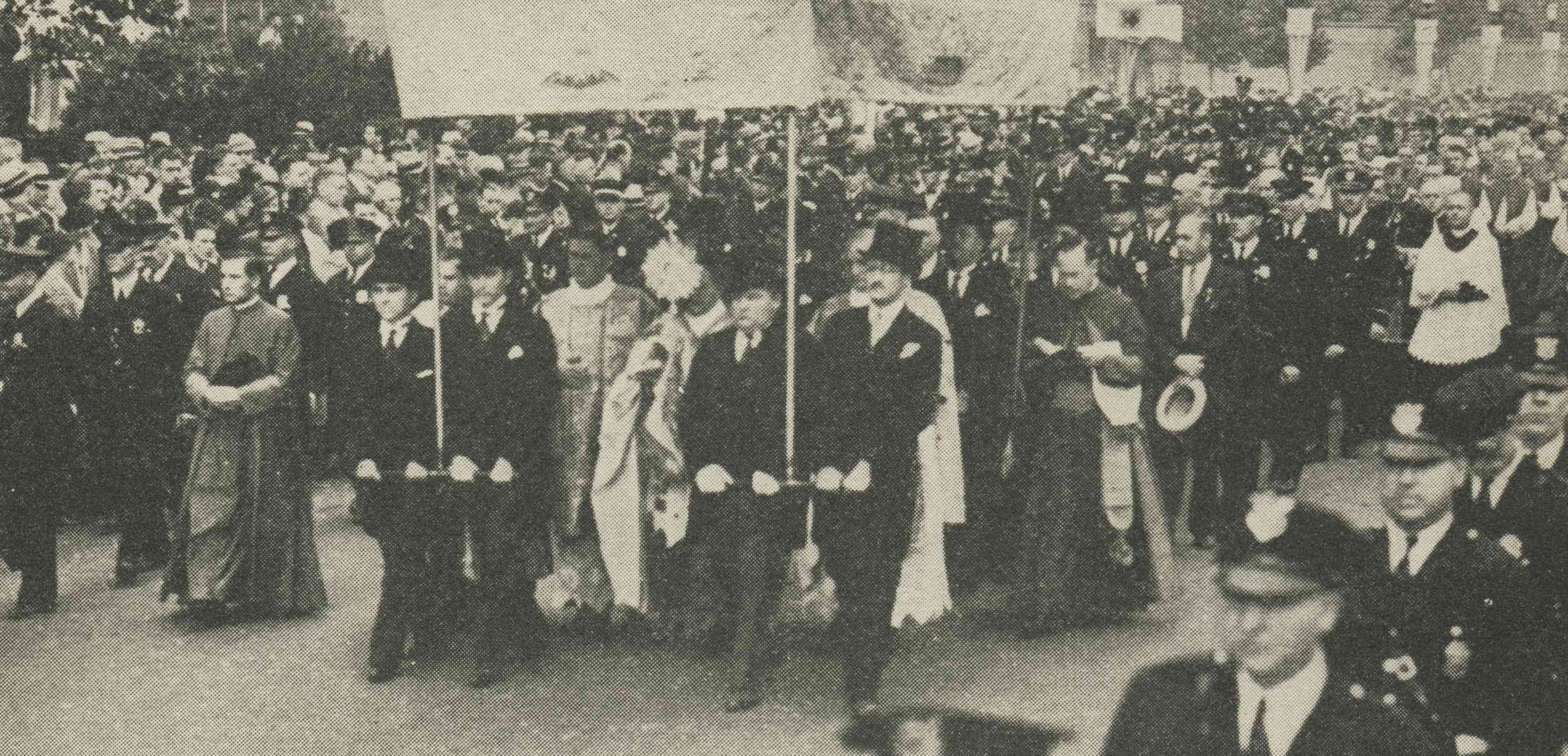
Photos of the closing procession

== Legacy ==
An official record of the congress was published in 1936. The next national Eucharistic congress would be held in New Orleans in 1938.
