= Eucharistic congress =

Assembly of the Catholic Church

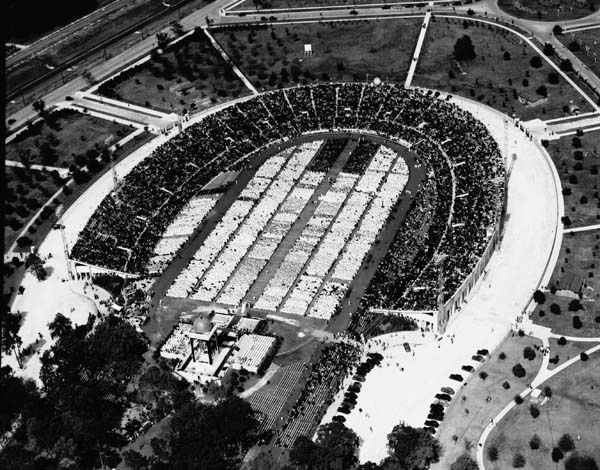
An aerial view of City Park Stadium in New Orleans, filled with worshippers at the National Eucharistic Congress of 1938

In the Catholic Church, a Eucharistic congress is a gathering of clergy, religious, and laity to bear witness to the real presence of Jesus in the Eucharist, which is an important Catholic doctrine. Congresses bring together people from a wide area, and typically involve large open-air Masses, Eucharistic adoration (Blessed Sacrament), and other devotional ceremonies held over several days. Congresses may both refer to National (varies by country) and International Eucharistic Congresses.

On 28 November 1897, Pope Leo XIII proclaimed Saint Paschal Baylón patron of Eucharistic Congresses and Associations.

== History ==
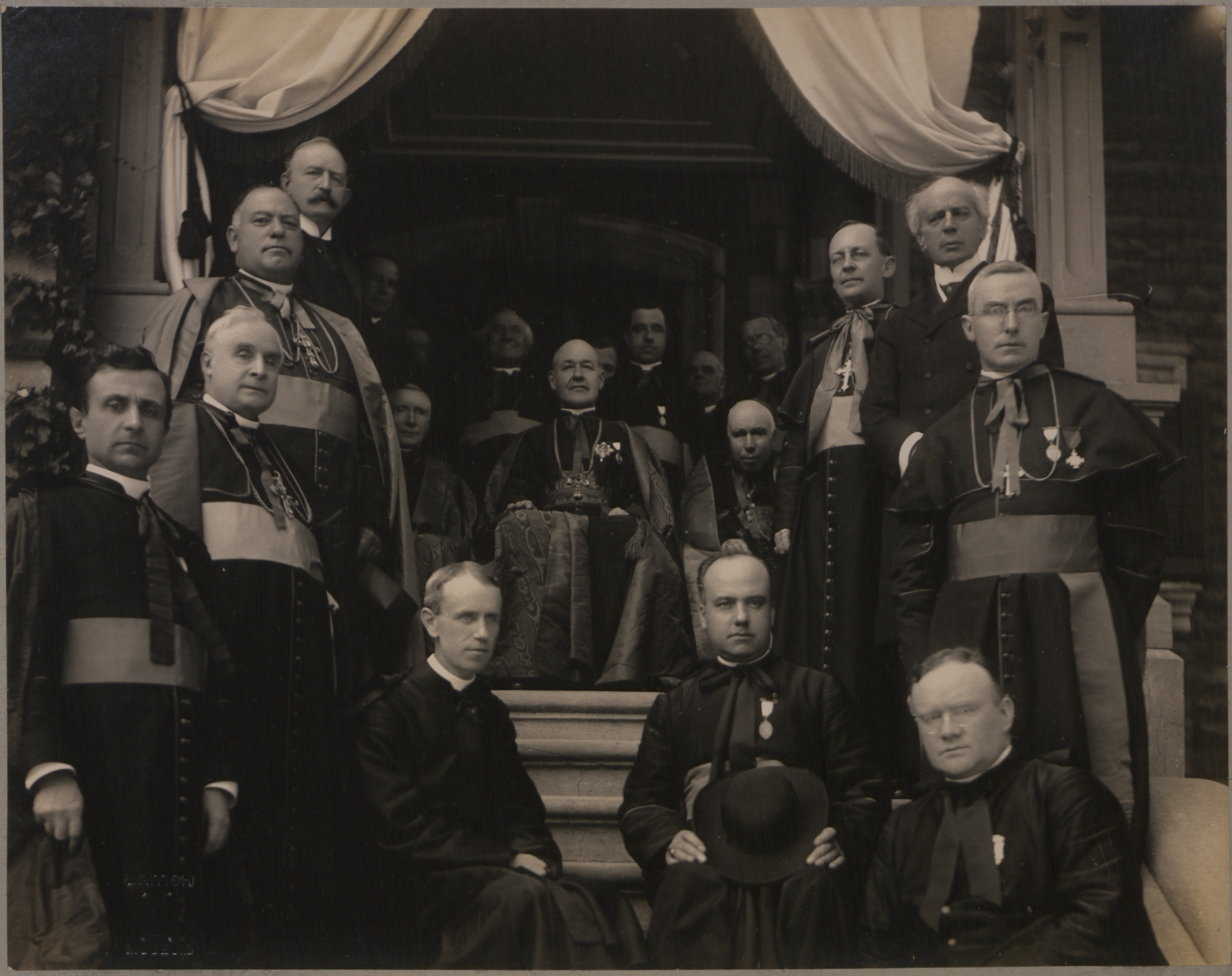
The 21st International Eucharistic Congress in Montreal in 1910. Canadian Prime Minister Wilfrid Laurier is standing on the right.

In June of 1881, the first Eucharistic Congress was held at Lille, France.

The initial inspiration behind the idea came from the laywoman Marie-Marthe-Baptistine Tamisier (1834–1910). Tamisier had studied under Saint Peter Julian Eymard and Fr Antoine Chevrier, and she worked with Bishop Gaston de Ségur for ten years to create a large gathering for the Eucharist.

The congress was such a success that it was decided to make it an annual event. The second congress was held in Avignon in 1882, followed by events in Liège (1883), Fribourg (1885) and Toulouse (1886).

The sixth congress met in Paris in 1888, at the great memorial Church of the Sacred Heart on Montmartre.

Antwerp hosted the next congress in 1890, at which an immense altar of repose was erected in the Place de Meir, and an estimated 150,000 persons gathered around it when Cardinal Goossens, Archbishop of Mechelen, gave the solemn benediction. Bishop Doutreloux of Liège was then president of the Permanent Committee for the Organization of Eucharistic Congresses, the body which has charge of the details of these meetings.

Of special importance also was the eighth congress, held in Jerusalem in 1893, as it was the first congress held outside Europe; 1905 saw the first congress in Rome.

In 1907, the congress was held in Metz, Lorraine, and the German government suspended the law of 1870 (which forbade processions) in order that the usual solemn procession of the Blessed Sacrament might be held. 1910 saw the first overseas congress, in Montreal.

Each year the congress had become more and more international in nature, and at the invitation of Archbishop Bourne of Westminster the nineteenth congress was held in London, the first among English-speaking members of the Church. The 1928 congress in Sydney saw the largest event in Australian history, with over 500,000 people attending the procession of the Blessed Sacrament.

Between 1881 and 2026, the Catholic Church has held 53 international Eucharistic Congresses.

=== Leadership and papers ===
The presidents of the Permanent Committee of the International Eucharistic Congresses, under whose direction all this progress was made, were:

- Bishop Gaston de Ségur of Lille; Archbishop de La Bouillerie, titular of Perga and coadjutor of Bordeaux;
- Archbishop Duquesnay of Cambrai;
- Cardinal Mermillod, Bishop of Lausanne and Geneva, Switzerland;
- Bishop Doutreloux of Liège, Belgium;
- Bishop Thomas Louis Heylen of Namur, Belgium.

After each congress this committee prepared and published a volume giving a report of all the papers read and the discussions on them in the various sections of the meeting, the sermons preached, the addresses made at the public meetings, and the details of all that transpired.

== List of International Congresses ==
International Eucharistic Congresses
| Num. | Date | Location | Theme | Notes |
|---|---|---|---|---|
| 1st | 1881 Jun | (France) Lille | The Eucharist Saves the World | |
| 2nd | 1882 Sep | (France) Avignon | | |
| 3rd | 1883 Jun | (Belgium) Liège | | |
| 4th | 1885 Sep | (Switzerland) Fribourg | | |
| 5th | 1887 Jun | (France) Toulouse | | |
| 6th | 1888 Jul | (France) Paris | | |
| 7th | 1890 Aug | (Belgium) Antwerp | | |
| 8th | 1893 May | (Ottoman Empire) Jerusalem | The Divine Mystery of the Eucharist | First congress held outside Europe. Attended by hundreds of Latin Rite and Eastern Rite Patriarchs, bishops, priests, and faithful. |
| 9th | 1894 Jul | (France) Reims | | |
| 10th | 1897 Sep | (France) Paray-le-Monial | | |
| 11th | 1898 Jul | (Belgium) Brussels | | |
| 12th | 1899 Aug | (France) Lourdes | | |
| 13th | 1901 Sep | (France) Angers | | |
| 14th | 1902 Sep | (Belgium) Namur | | |
| 15th | 1904 Jun | (France) Angoulême | | |
| 16th | 1905 Jun | (Kingdom of Italy) Rome | | |
| 17th | 1906 Aug | (Belgium) Tournai | | |
| 18th | 1907 Aug | (German Empire) Metz | | |
| 19th | 1908 Sep | (United Kingdom) London | | First Congress held in the English-speaking world. |
| 20th | 1909 Aug | (German Empire) Cologne | | |
| 21st | 1910 Sep 7–11 | (Canada) Montreal | | First Congress held in North America or the Western Hemisphere. |
| 22nd | 1911 Jul | (Spain) Madrid | | |
| 23rd | 1912 Sep 12–15 | (Austria-Hungary) Vienna | | |
| 24th | 1913 Apr 23–27 | Malta | | |
| 25th | 1914 Jul 22–25 | (France) Lourdes | The Eucharist and the Social Reign of Jesus Christ | Cardinal G. Pignatelli of Belmonte was the papal legate. |
| 26th | 1922 May 24–29 | (Kingdom of Italy) Rome | The Peaceful Reign of Our Lord Jesus Christ in the Eucharist | Pope Pius XI officiated the Mass at the St. Peter's Square; first congress after World War I. |
| 27th | 1924 Jul 22–27 | (Netherlands) Amsterdam | The Eucharist and Holland | Cardinal Van Rossum was the papal legate. |
| 28th | 1926 Jun 20–24 | (United States) Chicago | | First congress in the United States. Papal legate: Cardinal Bonzano. Hosted by Cardinal Mundelein, Archbishop of Chicago. Est worshippers: 500,000 at Soldier Field mass, 1 million at St. Mary of the Lake closing mass. |
| 29th | 1928 Sep 6–9 | (Australia) Sydney | | First congress in Australia. The procession of the Eucharist, headed by the papal legate Cardinal Cerretti, was witnessed by 500,000. |
| 30th | 1930 May 7–11 | (French protectorate of Tunisia) Carthage | The Eucharist is Africa's testimony | First congress held in Africa. |
| 31st | 1932 Jun 22–26 | (Republic of Ireland) Dublin | The Propagation of the Sainted Eucharist by Irish Missionaries | 1500th anniversary of Saint Patrick's arrival in Ireland. Catholic population of Ireland in 1932 was 3 million. |
| 32nd | 1934 Oct 10–14 | (Argentina) Buenos Aires | | First congress in South America. Papal legate Cardinal Pacelli (later Pope Pius XII). Over one million people around Tres de Febrero Park heard a radio broadcast from the pope in Vatican City. Cardinal Pacelli celebrated High Mass and pronounced apostolic blessing on participants. |
| 33rd | 1937 Feb 3–7 | (Philippines) Manila | Jesus in the Eucharist, Bread of Angels, Bread of Life | First congress in the Far East and in the Philippines. Attended by 1.5 million from around the world. Pontifical Masses in Rizal Park, with hundreds of thousands at each. |
| 34th | 1938 May 25–30 | (Hungary) Budapest | Eucharist, the Bond of Love | Papal legate Cardinal Pacelli (later Pope Pius XII). Over 100,000 people from all over the world, including 15 cardinals and 330 bishops. |
| 35th | 1952 May 27-Jun 1 | (Spain) Barcelona | Peace | First congress since the end of World War II. Attended by hundreds of bishops and church officials, including Cardinal Spellman of New York, and Cardinal Stritch of Chicago. The Cold War limited attendance from communist eastern European countries. |
| 36th | 1955 Jul 17–24 | (Brazil) Rio de Janeiro | Christ the Redeemer and His Eucharistic Kingdom | |
| 37th | 1960 Jul 31–Aug 7 | (West Germany) Munich | | City chosen by Pope Pius XII, who had been papal nuncio there. Attended by 430 bishops and 28 cardinals, including Cardinal Spellman of New York, Cardinal Cushing of Boston, and Cardinal Meyer of Chicago. Laid a foundation stone for a "church of atonement" near Dachau concentration camp. Closing Statio Orbis Mass celebrated on Theresienwiese Square. |
| 38th | 1964 Nov 12–15 | (India) Bombay | | First congress in a country without a significant Christian population, aiming to disseminate the doctrine of the "real presence of Christ in the Eucharist." Attended by Pope Paul VI, many cardinals, and 20,000 foreign visitors. |
| 39th | 1968 Aug 18–25 | (Colombia) Bogotá | The Eucharist as the Bond of Love | Bogotá was chosen personally by Pope Paul VI to host the 39th International Eucharistic Congress, following his visit to the Colombian capital. This was the third Congress ever held in a Spanish speaking country, and the first Congress held in Colombia. The Eucharistic Congress was attended by bishops, archbishops, cardinals, clergy members, and faithful from all over Latin America and the World, including the Archpishop of Bogota Luis Concha Cordoba, the Colombian Cardinal Alfonso López Trujillo, Pope Paul VI, the Archbishop of Buenos Aires Juan Carlos Aramburu, the Archbishop of Paris François Marty, Archbishop Carroll of Miami, and Archbishop Dearden of Detroit (USA). The Congress was focused on the renovation of the Catholic Church worldwide, but particularly that of Colombia, which was a country seeing great economic and social prosperity due to its economic boom in the mid 20th century. Colombia was a country that demonstrated the great social and economic changes to global societies, as Colombia strived industrialized and modern society, and it was with this in mind, that it was chosen to be the seat of the 1968 International Eucharistic Congress. |
| 40th | 1973 Feb 18–25 | (Australia) Melbourne | "Love one another as I have loved you!" | |
| 41st | 1976 Aug 1–8 | (United States) Philadelphia | Hungers of the Human Family | Attended by 1,500,000 people, including 44 Cardinals and 417 bishops. Theme: "The Eucharist and the Hungers of the Human Family" (physical and spiritual hungers). Mother Teresa and Dorothy Day were panelists at a conference on Women and the Eucharist. Future Pope John Paul II gave the homily for Freedom and Justice. US President Ford spoke of freedom and the Church's work for peace. |
| 42nd | 1981 Jul 16–23 | (France) Lourdes | "Jesus Christ, bread broken for a new world" | Organization: Henri Donze, Bishop of Lourdes; papal legate Cardinal Bernardin Gantin. Great number of young people, from Third World. Procession with candles successful. This was the third time the congress was held at Lourdes. |
| 43rd | 1985 Aug 11–18 | (Kenya) Nairobi | The Eucharist and the Christian Family | Attended by Pope John Paul II. |
| 44th | 1989 Oct 4–8 | (South Korea) Seoul | Christ is our Peace | As he did four years prior, Pope John Paul II attended the congress, holding the Solemn Mass entirely in Korean on the final day. The two principal objectives were: promoting a deeper understanding of the Eucharist; and living the eucharistic faith in the reality of our world. Attendance was reported to be around 1 million. |
| 45th | 1993 Jun 7–13 | (Spain) Seville | Christ Light of Nations | The first post-Cold War congress, Pope John Paul II addressed the congress and declared, "I hope the fruit of this congress results in the establishment of perpetual Eucharistic adoration in all parishes and Christian communities throughout the world." |
| 46th | 1997 May 25–Jun 1 | (Poland) Wrocław | Freedom as Reflected in the Eucharist | Attended by Pope John Paul II. The congress addressed the distinction between "freedom" and "liberty". |
| 47th | 2000 Jun 18–25 | (Italy) Rome | | The third to be celebrated in Rome, the congress was the first of its kind to be celebrated in a Jubilee Year. |
| 48th | 2004 Oct 10–17 | (Mexico) Guadalajara | | Pope John Paul II, being too ill to attend, named Cardinal Josef Tomko as Papal Legate. The Congress ended with a celebration of the Mass in the Jalisco Stadium in Guadalajara, with a live link up to a simultaneous Mass celebrated in St. Peter's Basilica in Rome, celebrated in the presence of Pope John Paul II. These simultaneous Masses marked the beginning of the Year of the Eucharist which ran from the International Eucharistic Congress to the General Assembly of the Synod of Bishops in October 2005. |
| 49th | 2008 Jun 15–22 | (Canada) Quebec City | The Eucharist, Gift of God for the Life of the World | This congress coincided with the 400th anniversary of the city's founding. The closing celebration took place on the Plains of Abraham, attended by tens of thousands of pilgrims. Pope Benedict XVI's message was broadcast live, in both French and English, from the Apostolic Palace in the Vatican, via giant screens set up on the meadow. The Pope announced the next Congress was to take place in Dublin, Ireland, in 2012. |
| 50th | 2012 Jun 10–17 | (Republic of Ireland) Dublin | The Eucharist: Communion with Christ and with one another (drawn from Lumen gentium) | The congress coincided with the 50th anniversary of the inauguration of the Second Vatican Council. In addition to the daily celebration of the Eucharist, there were over thirty workshops and presentations daily on various themes associated with the Eucharist. For many years, the Church has failed to respond appropriately to child abuse by clergy. The blessing of a Healing Stone by Archbishop Diarmuid Martin, as well as a personal meeting between the Papal Legate, Cardinal Marc Ouellet, and survivors of clergy sexual abuse, were among the ways in which the issue was addressed. The Pope delivered a pre-recorded address to the closing ceremony on June 17. |
| 51st | 2016 Jan 24–31 | (Philippines) Cebu City | Christ in You, Our Hope of Glory (From the Letter of St. Paul to the Colossians) | The second time in the Philippines, including Manila in 1937. Pope Francis appointed the first Cardinal of Myanmar Cardinal Charles Maung Bo as the Papal Legate. |
| 52nd | 2021 Sep 5–12 | (Hungary) Budapest | "In You (=in Eucharistic Jesus) is the source of all our blessings." (Cfr.: Ps 87, 7) | Originally scheduled to take place in September 2020, it was postponed a year due to the COVID-19 pandemic. This was the second time Hungary hosted after 1938. Pope Francis performed a mass at Heroes Square, Budapest. |
| 53rd | 2024 Sep 8–15 | (Ecuador) Quito | Fraternity to Heal the World | Ecuador was the second Andean country to host the event. It coincided with the 150th anniversary of the consecration of Ecuador to the Sacred Heart of Jesus made in 1874 by President Gabriel García Moreno and supported by Pope Pius IX. |
| 54th | 2028 | (Australia) Sydney | | It’s the first time the event is being held in Australia since Melbourne hosted in 1973, and the second time in Sydney since 1928, coinciding with the centenary of the first international eucharistic congress held in this city, and the largest ecumenical event since World Youth Day 2008. Pope Leo XIV has been formally invited to attend by Prime Minister Anthony Albanese. |

== List of National Congresses ==
National Eucharistic Congresses for the United States of America
| Num. | Date | Location | Theme | Notes |
|---|---|---|---|---|
| 1st | 1895 Oct 2–3 | Washington, DC | | Held at St. Patrick's Church, the oldest Catholic church in Washington, DC, and at Catholic University, then only 8 years old. Twenty-five archbishops and bishops attended, most prominently James Cardinal Gibbon, the Archbishop of Baltimore along with some 250 priests, most from Fr. Peter Julian Eymard's Priests' Eucharistic League, and most from the Eastern United States. |
| 2nd | 1901 Oct 8–10 | St. Louis, MO | | Held at St. Francis Xavier, the college church for St. Louis University, some 15 bishops and 600 priests from the Priests' Eucharistic League attended. |
| 3rd | 1904 Sep 27–29 | New York, NY | | Held at St. Patrick's Cathedral. Archbishop John M. Farley of New York hosted the event. |
| 4th | 1907 Oct 15–17 | Pittsburgh, PA | | Held in the Cathedral of St. Paul. |
| 5th | 1911 Sept 28-Oct 1 | Cincinnati, OH | | Held at St. Peter's Cathedral. Archbishop Henry K. Moeller of Cincinnati hosted the event. |
| 6th | 1930 Sep 23–25 | Omaha, NE | | The Congress was held at a number of different locations in Omaha, including the cathedral, St. Cecilia's and Creighton University. A number of newsreel companies were on hand to film the event. Bishop Joseph Rummel of Omaha hosted the event. |
| 7th | 1935 Sep 23–26 | Cleveland, OH | The Holy Eucharist, The Source and Inspiration of Catholic Action | 500,000 Catholics from around the nation attended. The final Mass, in Cleveland Municipal Stadium drew 125,000. Speakers included Fulton J. Sheen, and Alfred E. Smith, the first Catholic major party presidential candidate. Pope Pius XI addressed the Congress by radio. |
| 8th | 1938 Oct 17–20 | New Orleans, LA | | Held in City Park Stadium. Chicago's George Cardinal Mundelein, served as a special Papal legate for the Congress. The Goodyear Blimp broadcast sermons, music and the rosary over special loudspeakers along the route for the final procession. Over radio, Pope Pius XI opened the Congress with a five minute address and closed it with a special blessing from Castel Gandolfo. |
| 9th | 1941 Jun 22–26 | St. Paul, MN | Our Eucharistic Lord Glorified by Sacrifice | Held at the fairgrounds for the Minnesota State Fair. About 150 bishops from across the United States attended. |
| 10th | 2024 Jul 17–21 | Indianapolis, IN | Revival Happens Here | Held in the Indianapolis Colt's Lucas Oil Stadium. About 50,000 people attended, among whom were 1,500 Catholic priests. |

== See also ==
- Pontifical Committee for International Eucharistic Congresses
- Real presence of Christ in the Eucharist
- World Youth Day

== Bibliography ==
- Chesterton, Gilbert Keith. The Collected Works of G. K. Chesterton. Ignatius Press. ISBN 978-0-89870-854-7.
- de Courcy, J. W. (1996). The Liffey in Dublin. Gill & Macmillan. ISBN 978-0-7171-2423-7.
