= 5th National Eucharistic Congress (United States) =

1911 Catholic event in Cincinnati, Ohio

Fifth National Eucharistic Congress
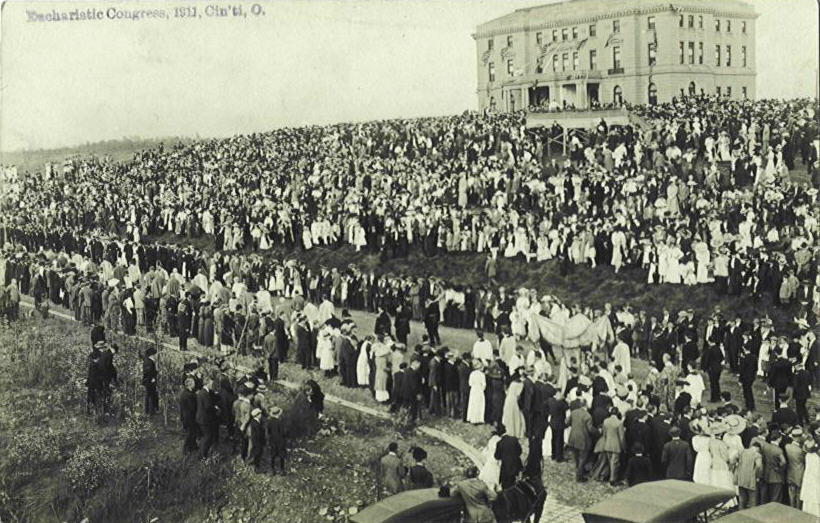
- An estimated 10,000 people participated at the closing ceremonies of the 1911 Congress. The processional canopy can be seen in the lower right-hand corner of this picture.
- Date: September 28 – October 1, 1911
- Duration: 4 days
- Venue: Cathedral Basilica of St. Peter in Chains; Archbishop's Residence (now Our Lady of the Holy Spirit Center)
- Location: Cincinnati, Ohio, US
- Organized by: Camillus Paul Maes

The Fifth National Eucharistic Congress was a Roman Catholic event that took place from September 28 to October 1, 1911, in Cincinnati, Ohio, United States, at the Cathedral Basilica of St. Peter in Chains as well as the archbishop's residence in Norwood, now the Our Lady of the Holy Spirit Center. The multi-day event, meant to encourage devotion to the Sacrament of the Eucharist, was hosted by the Archdiocese of Cincinnati under the leadership of Archbishop Henry K. Moeller. Around 10,000 people were estimated to have participated in the final ceremonies.

== Background ==
The first International Eucharistic Congress owed its inspiration to Bishop Gaston de Ségur, and was held at Lille, France, on June 21, 1881. The initial inspiration behind the idea came from the laywoman Marie-Marthe-Baptistine Tamisier who lobbied clergy a century after the French Revolution in an effort to restore religiosity and Eucharistic devotion to France. In 1879, Pope Leo XIII established a committee to plan the first international Eucharistic congress. In the wake of these international congresses, national congresses sprung up in the United States. Prior to the 1911 event, there were four other National Eucharistic Congresses in the United States.

== Preparation ==
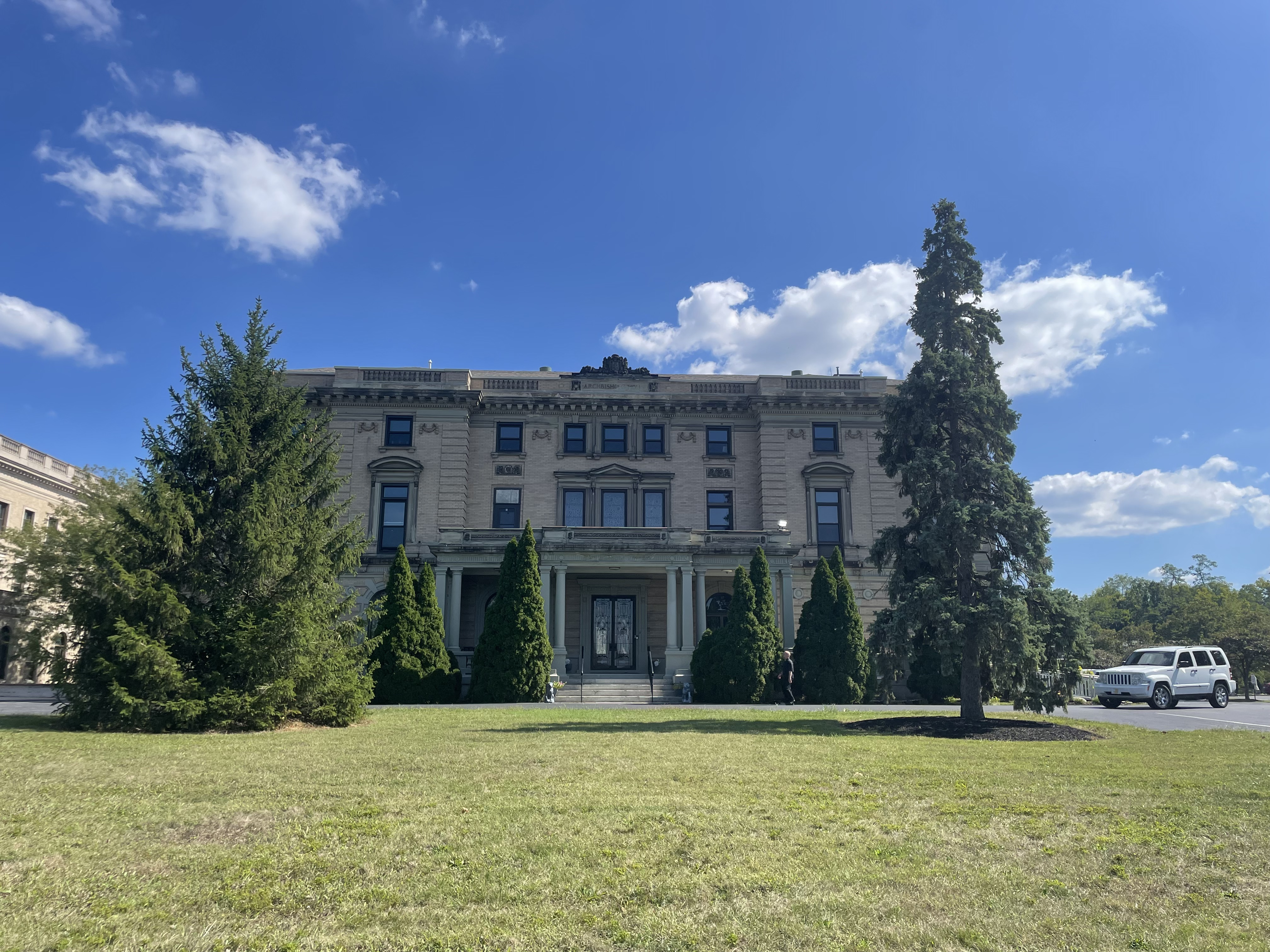
The new episcopal residence hosted multiple bishops during the Congress, and was the site of the closing ceremonies.

Following the 21st International Eucharistic Congress in Montreal, it was announced in September 1910 that the fifth American Congress would be hosted in Cincinnati, Ohio. The Burnet House was chosen as the official hotel of the event and offered special rates for attending clergy. Archbishop Moeller's newly-completed residence in Norwood was repainted in preparation for the guests it would host, and St. Peter Cathedral was extensively beautified and renovated. Archbishop Henry Moeller instructed that every Catholic church in the city be decorated with both the colors of the papacy -- white and gold -- and the red, white, and blue of the American flag, and that all the church bells in Cincinnati be rung for five minutes following the opening of the Congress.

== Congress ==
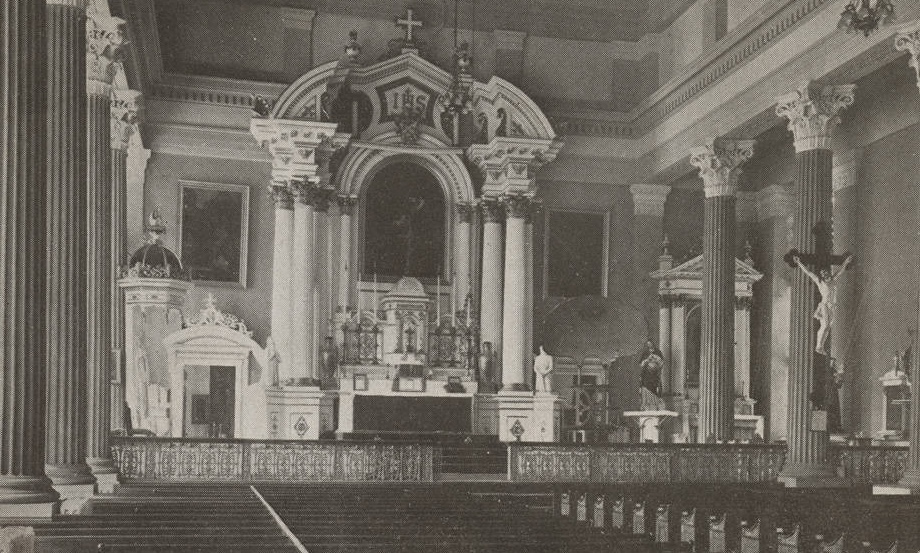
The Cathedral of St. Peter in Chains hosted the daily Masses for the 1911 Congress.

The Congress opened on Thursday, October 28 at 9am with a Pontifical High Mass celebrated by Moeller, with the sermon, "The Eucharist, the Complement of the Incarnation", being preached by archbishop John Ireland of the Archdiocese of Saint Paul and Minneapolis. Papers and discussion in the basement cathedral hall followed until the evening, when eucharistic adoration was hosted in all the churches of the city of Cincinnati. On Friday, Henry Richter of Grand Rapids celebrated Mass and James Hartley of Columbus preached on "Why We Believe in the Eucharist". The afternoon and evening sessions consisted a paper titled "Belief in the Eucharist prior to the Reformation" presented by Edward D. Kelly, auxiliary bishop of Detroit and discussion facilitated by John Lawler of St. Paul. Like on Thursday, Adoration was hosted throughout the city on Friday evening. Mass on Saturday was said by John Farrelly and Joseph Schrembs gave a homily titled "The Eucharist, the Center of Catholic Life". In light of the outbreak of the Italo-Turkish War, the congress adopted a resolution urging for greater devotion to the Eucharist as a means of fostering peace. On Sunday, October 1, the final day of the Congress, John Farley celebrated Mass and James Blenk preached concerning "The Individual and the Necessity of Eucharist Faith".

32 bishops and 1,000 priests attended the event, with bishops such as Hugh McSherry and Peter Joseph Hurth travelling from as far as South Africa and Dhaka, Bangladesh, respectively.

=== Closing procession ===
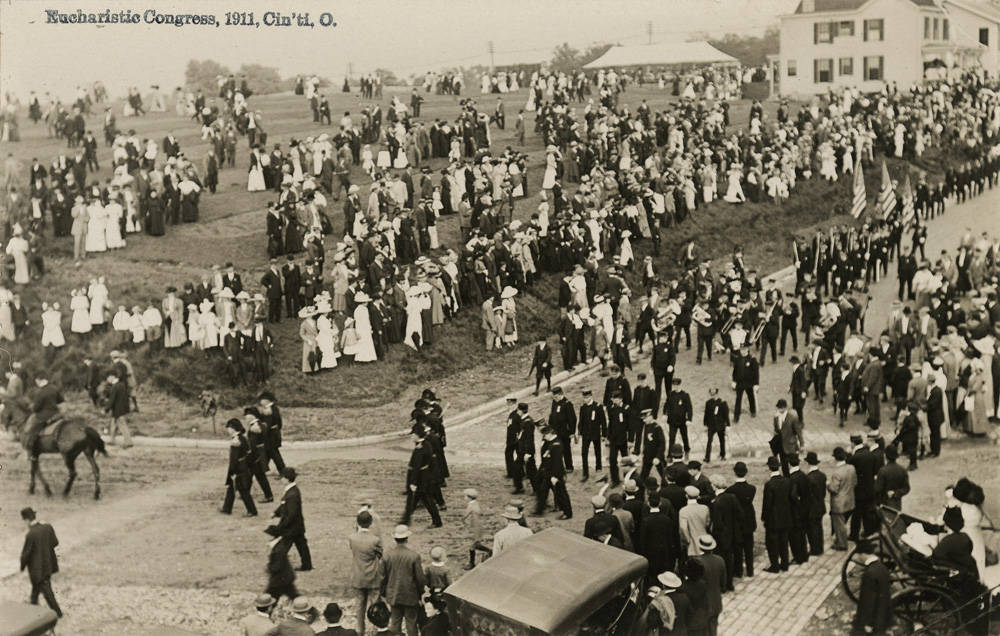
Onlookers spectating the beginning of the closing procession.

The Congress had been set to close with a Eucharistic procession on Sunday at 3pm at the site of Archbishop Moeller's new residence in Norwood. However, it began to rain at around 11:30am and clouds did not break until after shortly after 3pm, allowing the procession to begin beneath a rainbow, escorted by Knights of St. John and Hibernian Rifles. The monstrance containing the Eucharist was set on an altar on the porch of the archbishop's mansion, and then Moeller gave the Apostolic blessing followed by Benediction of the Blessed Sacrament.
