= 1st National Eucharistic Congress (United States) =

1895 Catholic event in Washington, DC

First National Eucharistic Congress
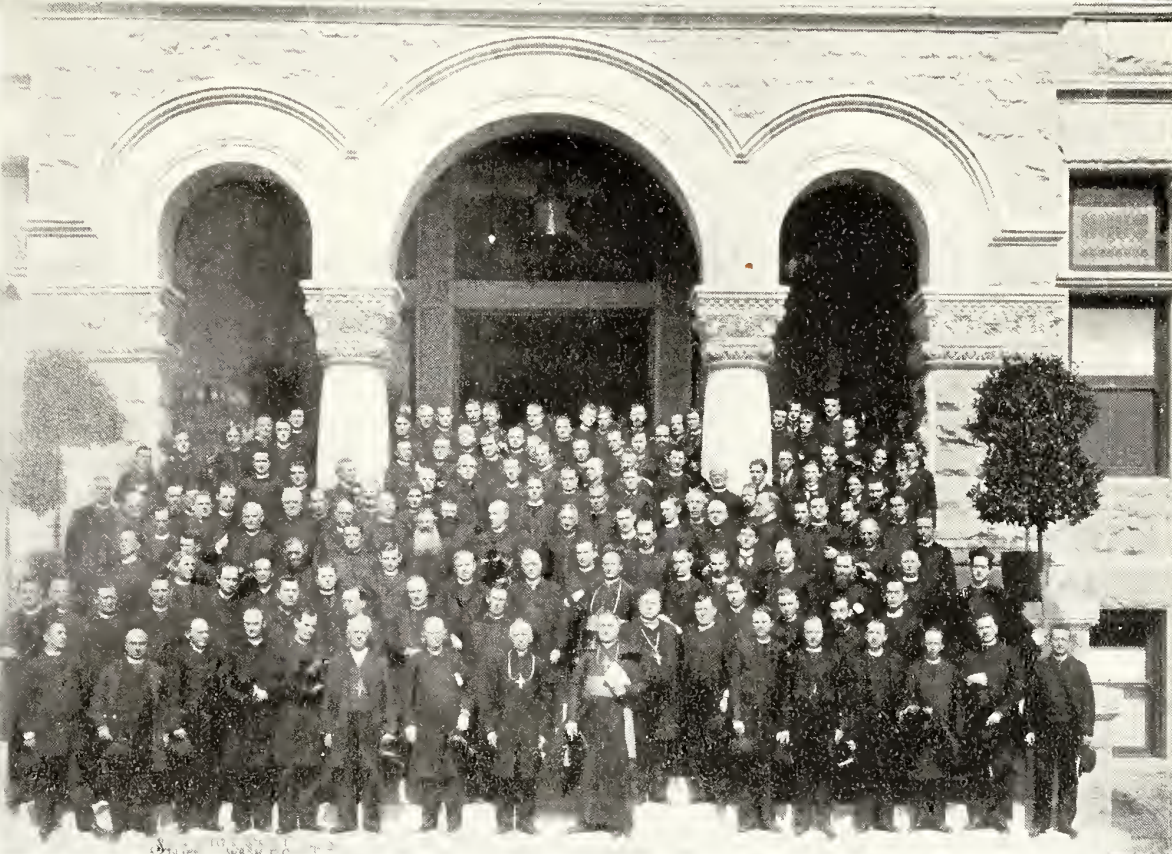
- The members of the First National Eucharistic Congress in 1895 in front of McMahon Hall at Catholic University of America
- Date: October 2–3, 1895
- Duration: 2 days
- Location: Washington, D.C.
- Type: Eucharistic congress
- Organized by: Camillus Paul Maes
- Papal envoy: Francesco Satolli

The First National Eucharistic Congress was an event held October 2–3, 1895 in Washington, D.C. for the purpose of fostering devotion to the sacrament of the Eucharist. It was held at St. Patrick's Church, the oldest Catholic church in Washington, D.C., and at Catholic University, then only 7 years old.

== Attendance ==
Twenty-five archbishops and bishops attended, most prominently James Cardinal Gibbons, the Archbishop of Baltimore and Archbishop Francesco Satolli, Apostolic Delegate to the United States.

250 priests attended, most from Fr. Peter Julian Eymard's Priests' Eucharistic League, and most from the Eastern United States.

== Event ==
The congress on October 2 was opened at McMahon Hall at Catholic University with the reading of a letter to the congress by Pope Leo XIII. In it, he expressed his pleasure at the congress was being held and sent his apostolic benediction. Bishop John Keane, first rector of the Catholic University of America, welcomed the visitors. Three papers were then presented: The Place of the Holy Eucharist in the Divine Plan of Salvation by Rev. E.R. Dyer of St. Mary's Seminary in Baltimore, The Holy Eucharist and the Personal Life of the Priest by Rev. D. J. McMahon, and The Holy Eucharist and the Ministry of the Priest by Rev. D.F. Feehan. The day closed with adoration at St. Patrick's Church celebrated by Archbishop William Elder of Cincinnati.

On October 3, the papers How to Promote Devotion to the Blessed Sacrament among the People by Rev. J. F. Foley, The Preparation of Souls for First Communion by Rev. H.J. Heuser of St. Charles's Seminary, Priests' Eucharistic League by Rev. H. Brinkmeyer, and How the Real Presence makes Converts by Rev. Walter Elliott were presented in the morning. The afternoon session consisted of The Holy Eucharist in the Eastern Church by Rev. Joseph Yazbeck, a Maronite Missionary.

The congress was closed with a Eucharistic procession through the university grounds, concluding with the Te Deum. Almost four hundred "priests, prelates, divinity students, altar boys, and members of various monkish denominations" processed, along with members of the laity.

=== Annual meeting of archbishops ===
After the congress, the archbishops of the United States who were present conducted their annual meeting, at which "minor diocesan matters" were discussed. In attendance were Archbishop James Cardinal Gibbons of Baltimore, Archbishop John Williams of Boston, Archbishop Michael Corrigan of New York, Archbishop William Elder of Cincinnati, John Hennessy of Dubuque, and Archbishop Francis Janssens of New Orleans. Bishop John Vertin of Sault Sainte Marie–Marquette represented Archbishop Frederick Katzer of Milwaukee, who was in Rome at the time.
