= Diego Venini =

Roman Catholic bishop

His Excellency, The Most Reverend Diego Venini
- Papal almoner
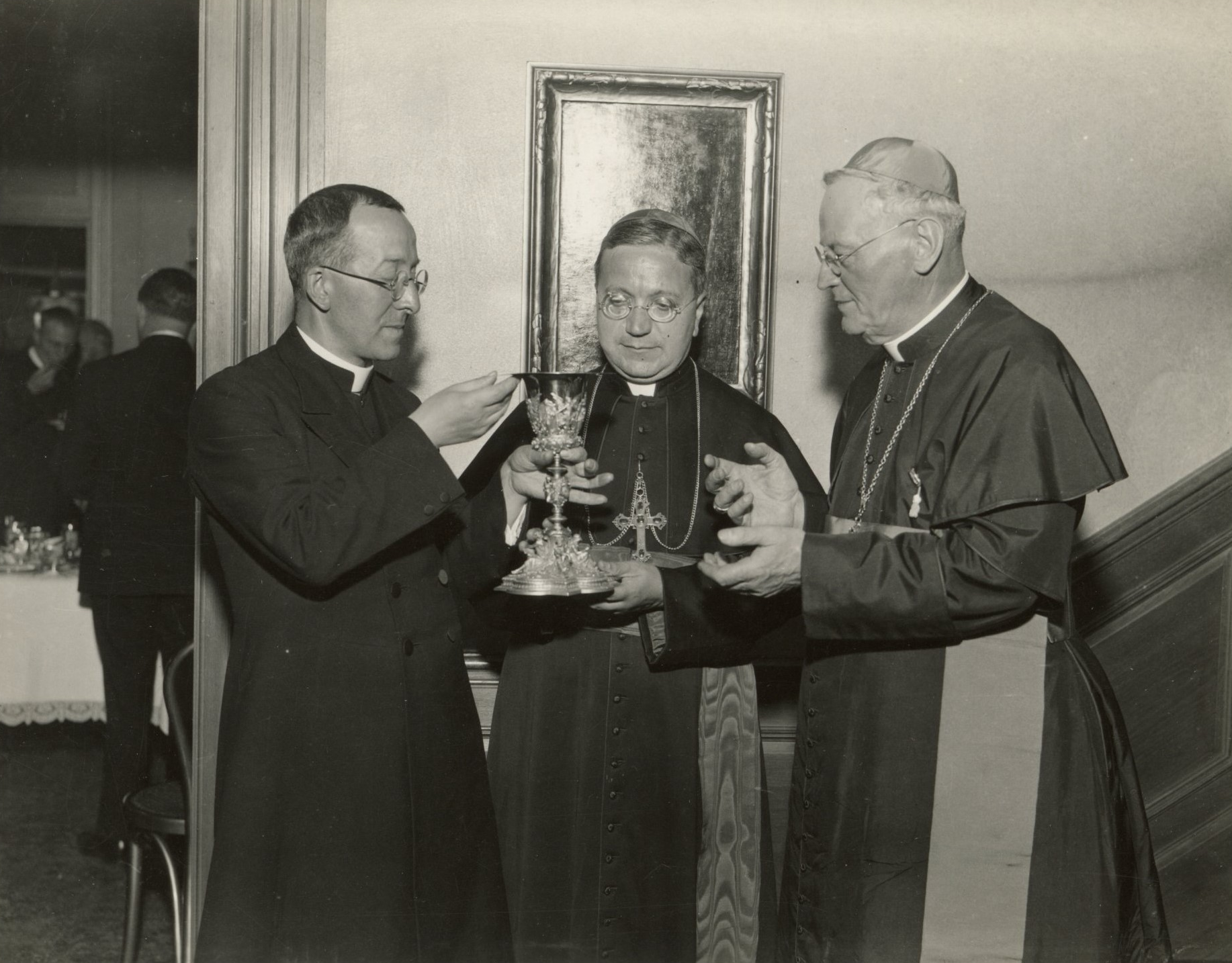
- Venini presents Bishop Joseph Schrembs a chalice from Pope Pius XI
- Appointed: 12 January 1951
- Other post: Titular archbishop of Adana
- Previous post: Personal secretary of Pope Pius XI

Orders
- Ordination: 6 July 1913 by Andrea Carlo Ferrari
- Consecration: 4 February 1951 by Eugène Tisserant

Personal details
- Born: 4 October 1889 Varenna
- Died: 20 July 1981 (aged 91) Milan

Diego Venini (4 October 1889 – 20 July 1981) was an Italian Catholic archbishop who served as the private secretary of Pope Pius XI and later the Secret Almoner of the Office of Papal Charities.

== Early life ==
He was born on 4 October 1889 in Fiumelatte, a hamlet of Varenna, a small town on the eastern shore of Lake Como, at the time in the Archdiocese of Milan. After completing his studies at the archdiocesan seminary, he was ordained a priest by Cardinal Archbishop Andrea Carlo Ferrari on 6 July 1913, the day his mother died.

== Priesthood ==
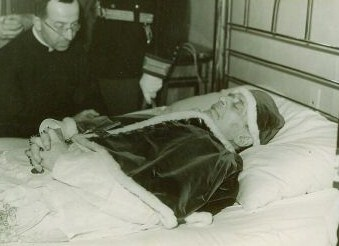
Venini next to the body of Pope Pius XI

Venini was initially appointed as the assistant of the parish of Santa Tecla of the Milan Cathedral, and spiritual assistant to the Sisters of Charity of Saints Bartolomea Capitanio and Vincenza Gerosa. On 13 June 1913, Pope Benedict XV appointed Achille Ratti as the cardinal Archbishop of Milan. Ratti assumed that office on 8 September 1913. Ratti selected Carlo Confalonieri and Diego Venini as his secretaries. Following the death of Pope Benedict XV in January 1922, Ratti was elected the 259th Supreme Pontiff on 6 February 1922 and took the name Pope Pius XI.

For the following 17 years until Pope Pius XI's death, Venini served alongside Confalonieri as personal secretaries of the pope. On 12 April 1935, the Pope appointed Venini a domestic prelate and on 22 January of the following year, a protonotary apostolic. He attended the 7th National Eucharistic Congress of the United States as one of the pope's representatives.

Pope Pius XI died on 10 February 1939. Following the election of Pope Pius XII, Venini was named a chamberlain.

== Episcopate ==
Following the 1 January 1951 death of Giuseppe Mignone, the papal almoner, Pius XII appointed Venini as Mignone's successor and appointed him the titular archbishop of Adana. Venini was consecrated in St. Peter's Basilica on 4 February 1951 by Eugène Tisserant.

In his role as papal almoner, he participated in the funerals of Pius XII and John XXIII and in the Conclaves of 1958 and 1963. He attended all sessions of the Second Vatican Council.

Approaching the age of 80, he retired from the role of almoner on 16 December 1968. He died on 20 July 1981.

== Honors ==
Order of Merit of the Federal Republic of Germany (1958)

== Bibliography ==
- Lauro Consonni (2009). Monsignor Diego Venini, storia di una vita di fedeltà e di umiltà. Bellano: Edizione Grafiche Rusconi.
