= Henry K. Moeller =

American prelate

His Excellency, The Most Reverend Henry K. Moeller
- Archbishop of Cincinnati
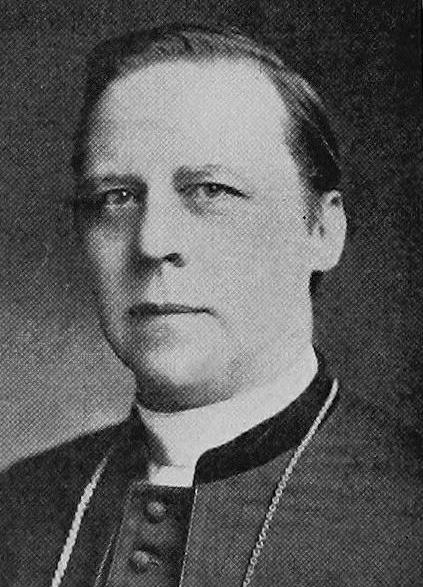
- Archdiocese: Cincinnati
- Installed: February 15, 1905
- Term ended: January 5, 1925
- Predecessor: William Henry Elder
- Successor: John T. McNicholas
- Previous posts: Bishop of Columbus (1900-1903); Titular Archbishop of Areopolis (1903-1904); Coadjutor Archbishop of Cincinnati (1903-1904)

Orders
- Ordination: June 10, 1876 by Giulio Lenti
- Consecration: August 25, 1900 by William Henry Elder

Personal details
- Born: December 11, 1849 Cincinnati, Ohio, US
- Died: January 5, 1925 (aged 75) Cincinnati
- Buried: St. Joseph New Cemetery, Cincinnati
- Denomination: Catholic Church
- Education: St. Xavier College; Pontifical North American College; Urban College of Propaganda
- Motto: Pasce oves meas (Feed my sheep)
- Coat of arms

Ordination history of Henry K. Moeller
History
Priestly ordination
- Ordained by: Giulio Lenti
- Date: 10 June 1876
- Place: St. John Lateran, Rome, Italy
Episcopal consecration
- Principal consecrator: William Henry Elder
- Co-consecrators: Henry Joseph Richter Thomas Sebastian Byrne
- Date: 25 August 1900
- Place: St. Peter in Chains, Cincinnati, Ohio
Episcopal succession
Bishops consecrated by Henry K. Moeller as principal consecrator
- James Joseph Hartley: 25 February 1904
- Ferdinand Brossart: 25 January 1916
- Alphonsus Cardinal Stritch: 30 November 1921
- Francis William Howard: 15 July 1923
- Francis Joseph Beckman: 1 May 1924

Henry K. Moeller (December 11, 1849 – January 5, 1925) was an American Catholic prelate who served as bishop of Columbus in Ohio (1900–1903) and archbishop of Cincinnati in Ohio (1904–1925).

== Biography ==
=== Early life ===
Henry Moeller was born on December 11, 1849, in Cincinnati, Ohio, to Bernard and Teresa (née Witte) Moeller, who were immigrants from Westphalia in Prussia (now Germany). He was the oldest of seven children; one of his sisters became a nun, and two brothers also became priests. His father worked as a cabinet maker and carpenter before becoming a bricklayer and building contractor. Henry Moeller was baptized by Reverend John Henry Luers the day after his birth. Moeller received his early education at the parochial school of St. Joseph Parish in the West End of Cincinnati.

In 1863, Moeller entered St. Xavier College in Cincinnati, graduating with highest honors in 1869. He was then sent by Archbishop John Purcell to study philosophy and theology at the Pontifical North American College in Rome. In his competitive examinations, he won three first prizes in theology. Moeller was ordained a subdeacon on November 2, 1875, and a deacon on November 10.

=== Priesthood ===
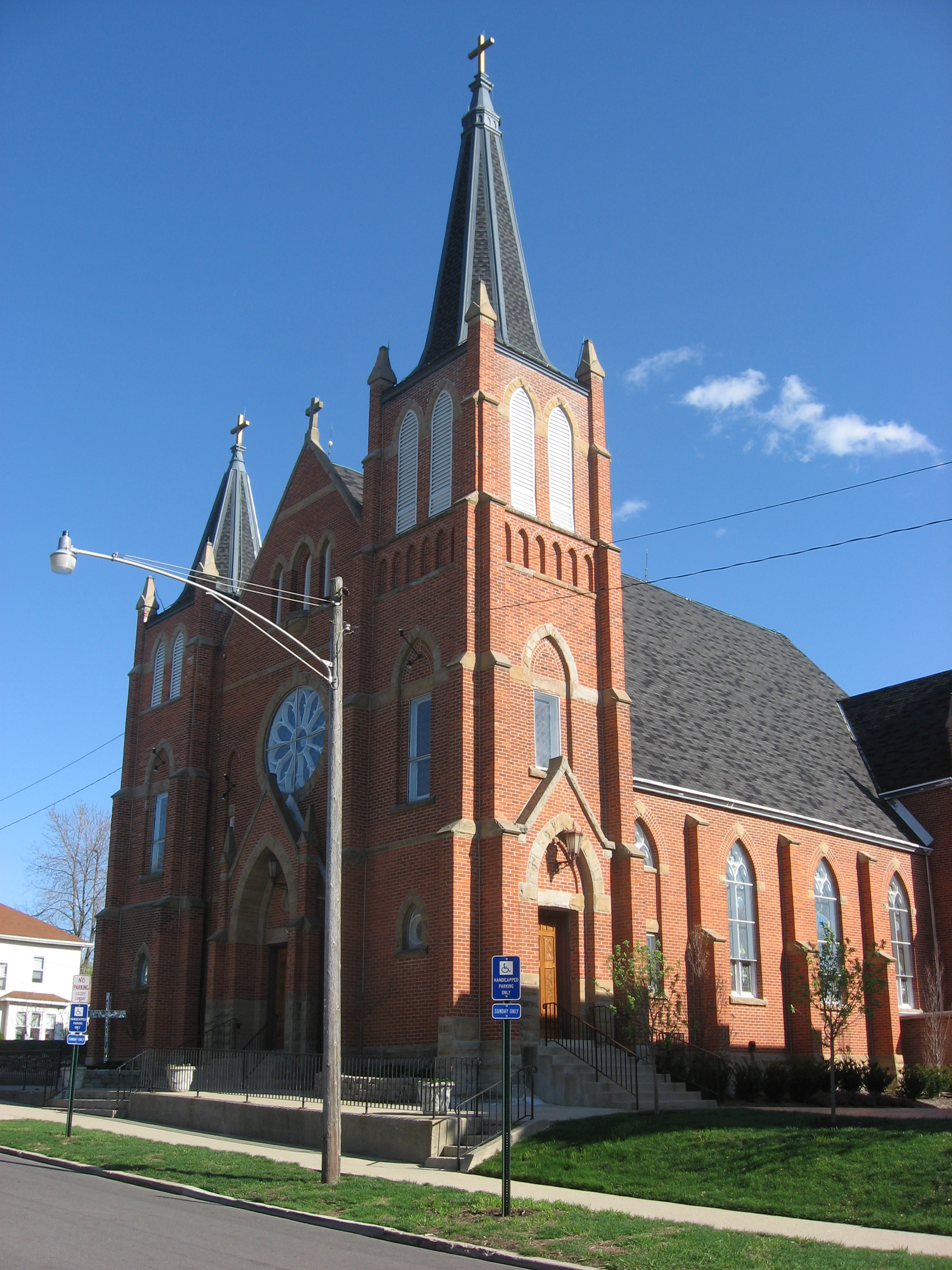
St. Patrick's Church, Bellefontaine, Ohio (2010)

On June 10, 1876, Moeller was ordained to the priesthood for the Archdiocese of Cincinnati by Archbishop Giulio Lenti at the Basilica of St. John Lateran in Rome. That same year he received his Doctor of Divinity degree from the Urban College of Propaganda in Rome. Following his return to Ohio, Moeller was appointed pastor of St. Patrick Parish in Bellefontaine in September 1876. He then served as a professor at Mount St. Mary's Seminary of the West in Norwood, Ohio, from 1877 to 1879.

In November 1879, Moeller was granted a leave of absence from the archdiocese to assist Bishop Silas Chatard of the Diocese of Vincennes in Indiana. He served as secretary to Chatard until 1880, when he was recalled to Cincinnati by Archbishop William Elder to serve as his own secretary. Moeller served as chancellor of the archdiocese from 1886 to 1900.

=== Bishop of Columbus ===
On April 6, 1900, Moeller was appointed the third bishop of Columbus by Pope Leo XIII. He received his episcopal consecration on August 25, 1900, from Archbishop Elder, with Bishops Henry Richter and Thomas Byrne serving as co-consecrators, at St. Peter in Chains Cathedral in Cincinnati. He was installed at St. Joseph Cathedral in Columbus on August 27.

During his brief tenure in Columbus, Moeller reduced the debt the diocese incurred from building the cathedral, established parish boundaries for Franklin County, and created three new parishes and four missions. In 1902, Moeller presided over the fifth diocesan synod, which set regulations for the needs of the clergy and people of the diocese.

=== Coadjutor Archbishop and Archbishop of Cincinnati ===
Moeller was named coadjutor archbishop of Cincinnati and titular archbishop of Areopolis by Pope Pius X on April 27, 1903. As coadjutor, he assumed the administrative duties of the archdiocese. Upon the death of Elder, Moeller automatically succeeded him to become the fourth archbishop of Cincinnati on October 31, 1904. He was formally installed as archbishop and received the pallium on February 15, 1905.

Moeller oversaw the 5th National Eucharistic Congress in Cincinnati as well as the movement of Mt. St. Mary's to its Norwood campus (now Our Lady of the Holy Spirit Center). In 1921, Moeller condemned several forms of dancing (including the Shimmy and Camel Walk) as well as bare female shoulders at social functions.

=== Death and legacy ===
Henry Moeller died in Cincinnati on January 5, 1925, at age 75. He is buried in the mausoleum at St. Joseph Cemetery in Price Hill. Archbishop Moeller High School, a parochial school in Cincinnati, was named for him.

Catholic Church titles
Preceded by John Ambrose Watterson	Bishop of Columbus; 1900–1903	Succeeded by James Joseph Hartley
Preceded by William Henry Elder	Archbishop of Cincinnati; 1903–1925	Succeeded by John T. McNicholas
