= 52nd International Eucharistic Congress =

2021 International Eucharistic Congress
- Native name: NEK
- English name: International Eucharistic Congress
- Date: September 5–12, 2021
- Location: Budapest, Hungary
- Theme: All my springs are in you. (Psalm 87:7)
- Website: www.iec2020.hu

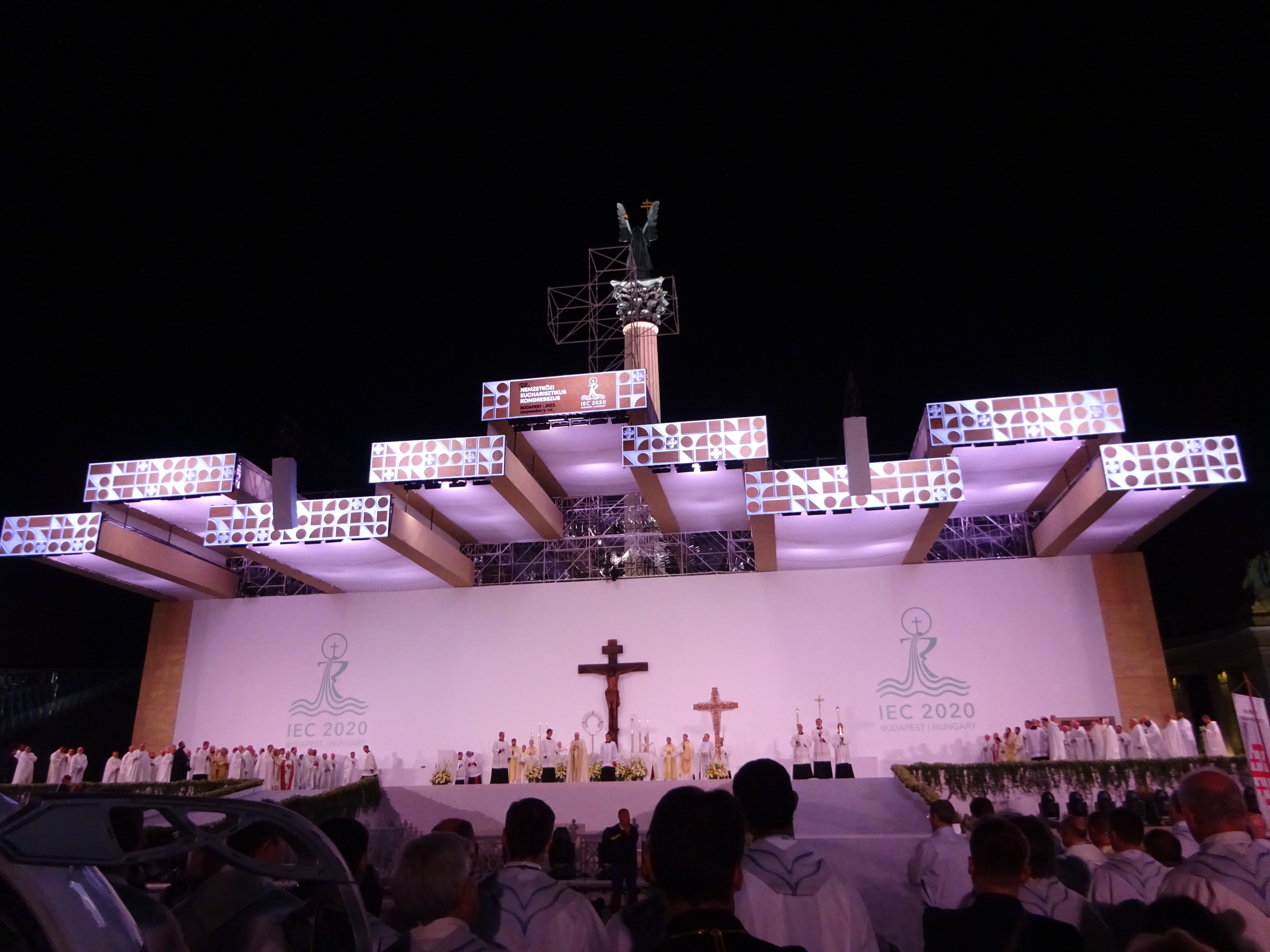
Main altar in Heroes' Square (Hősök tere) at Budapest during 52nd International Eucharistic Congress 2021

The 2021 International Eucharistic Congress was the 52nd edition of the International Eucharistic Congress (IEC) which took place in 2021 in Budapest, Hungary. The one-week event held regularly since 1881 (every four years in recent times) celebrates the Real presence of Christ in the Eucharist according to the teaching of the Catholic Church.

This is the second time that Hungary hosted the International Eucharistic Congress, with the first one also held in Budapest in 1938. Cardinal Péter Erdő, Archbishop of Esztergom-Budapest saw a great significance for the Catholic Church in Hungary in hosting the event, which is an introduction towards the world.

== Preparations ==
Budapest was named host city by Pope Francis in January 2016, at the end of the 2016 International Eucharistic Congress held in Cebu City, Philippines.

The official start of the preparation was marked by a four-day visit of archbishop Piero Marini, president of the Pontifical Committee for International Eucharistic Congresses. This was the beginning of a four-year preparation period, including the formation of a theologic committee, definition of the theme of the event, as well as organising religious preparation events.

The General Secretariat of the Budapest International Eucharistic Congress was formed, and Péter Erdő nominated its chief secretary, Kornél Fábry (priest of the Diocese of Kaposvár). The secretariat started working in the Primate's Palace in Buda Castle, but it would be provided with its own headquarters in Vörösmarty Street. Eight subcommittees supported its work, responsible for the fields of theology, liturgy, arts, finances, media and event organisation. The theological committee had to define the theme of the congress, and propose a motto by March 2017 for the pope to decide. It was announced that COVID-19 prevention methods such as masks weren't mandatory for visitors and atteendes. Due to the COVID-19 pandemic, the event originally scheduled for September 2020 was postponed for a year.

== Opening ceremony and concluding mass ==
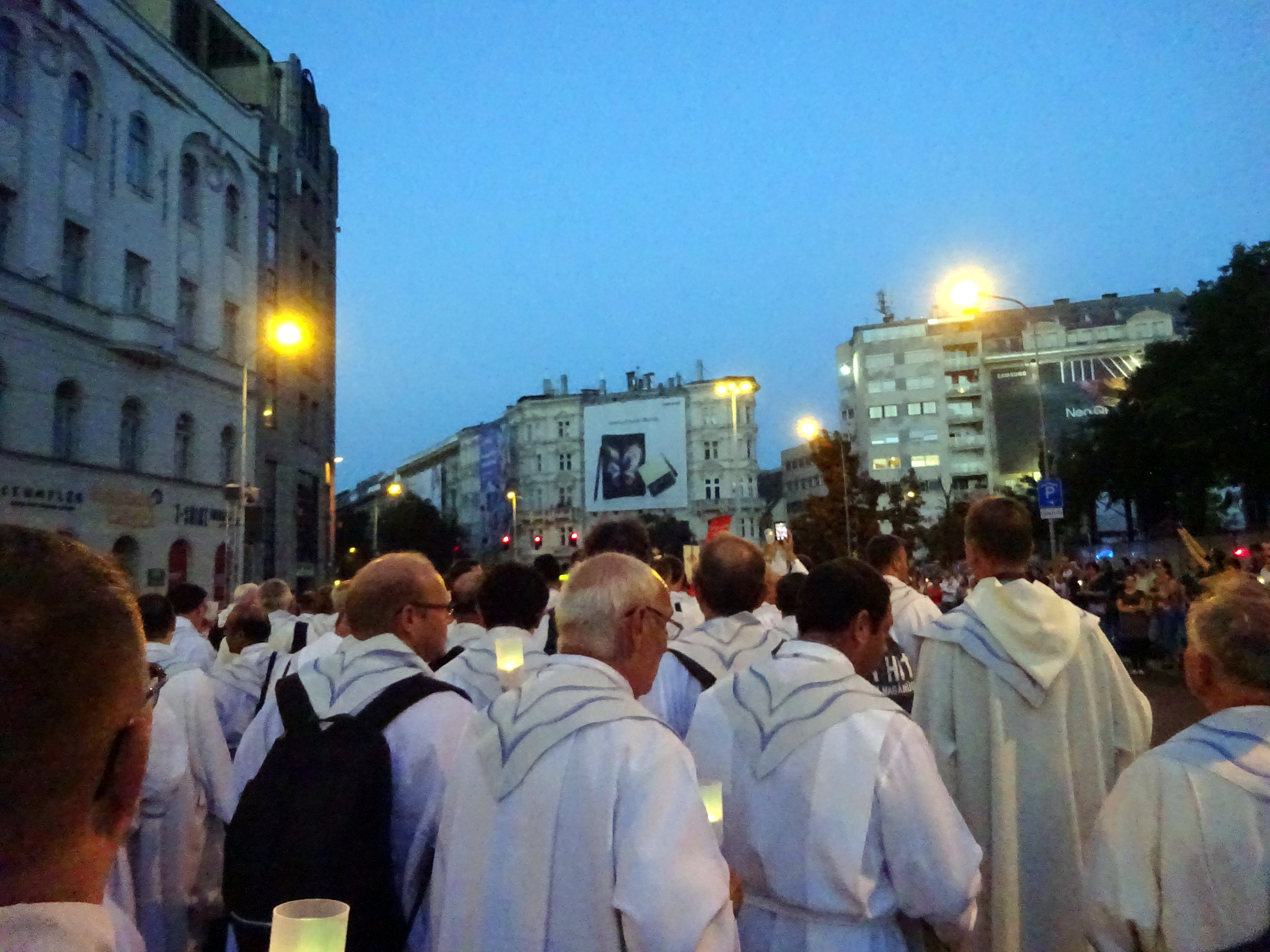
Procession across Budapest during 52nd International Eucharistic Congress 2021 on 11 September

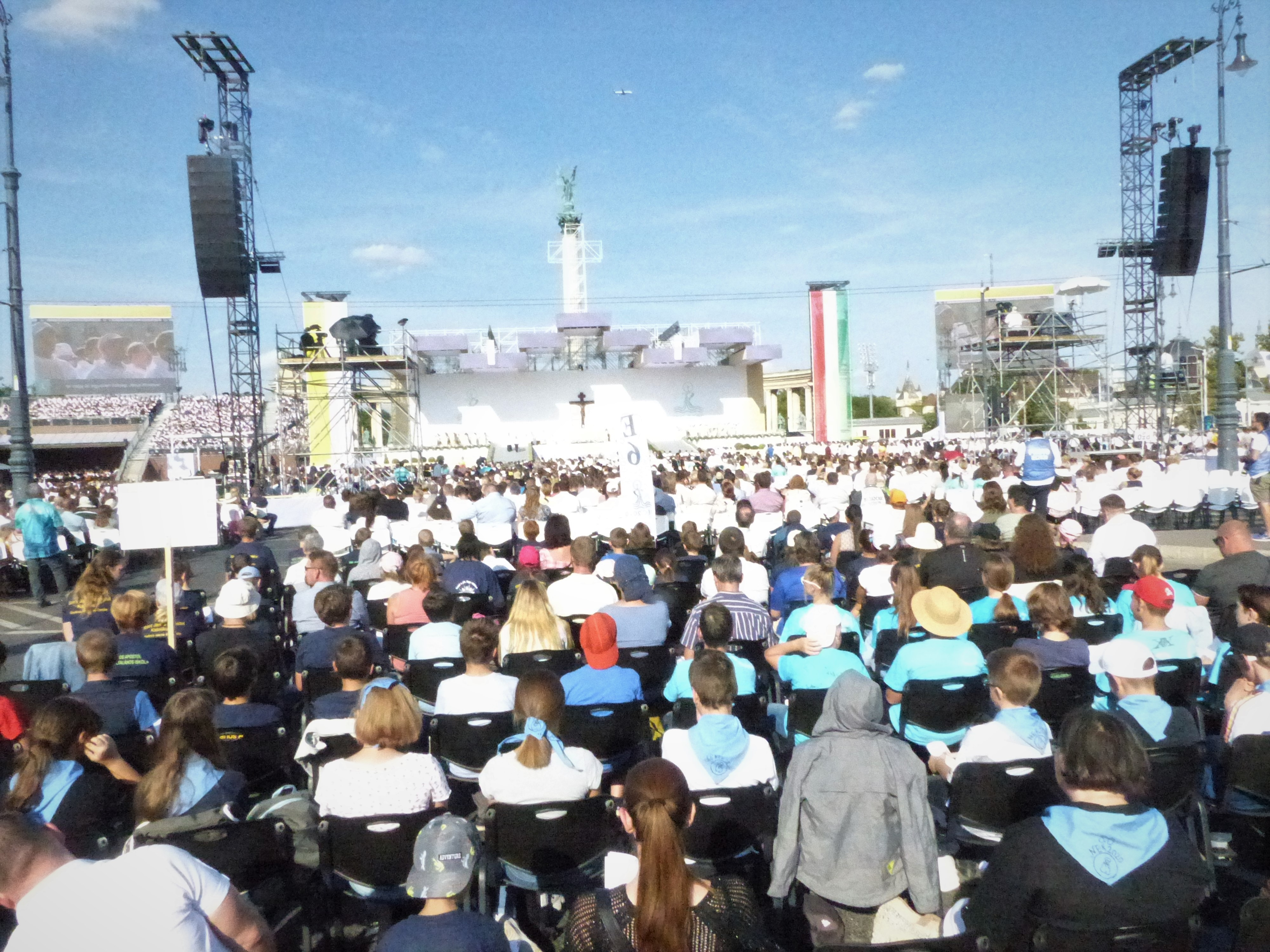
Opening Ceremony offered by Cardinal Angelo Bagnasco

The Opening Ceremony of the 2021 International Eucharistic Congress took place in Heroes square, Budapest. Cardinal Angelo Bagnasco offered the opening Mass starting at 4 p.m. on the 5th of September, 2021. The Mass was attended by students from Hungary's Catholic schools, some of whom received First Communion.

The concluding Mass was celebrated by Pope Francis as a ‘Statio Orbis,’ a liturgy manifesting the unity of the whole Church around the table of the Lord.
