= Year of the Eucharist =

Catholic liturgical year

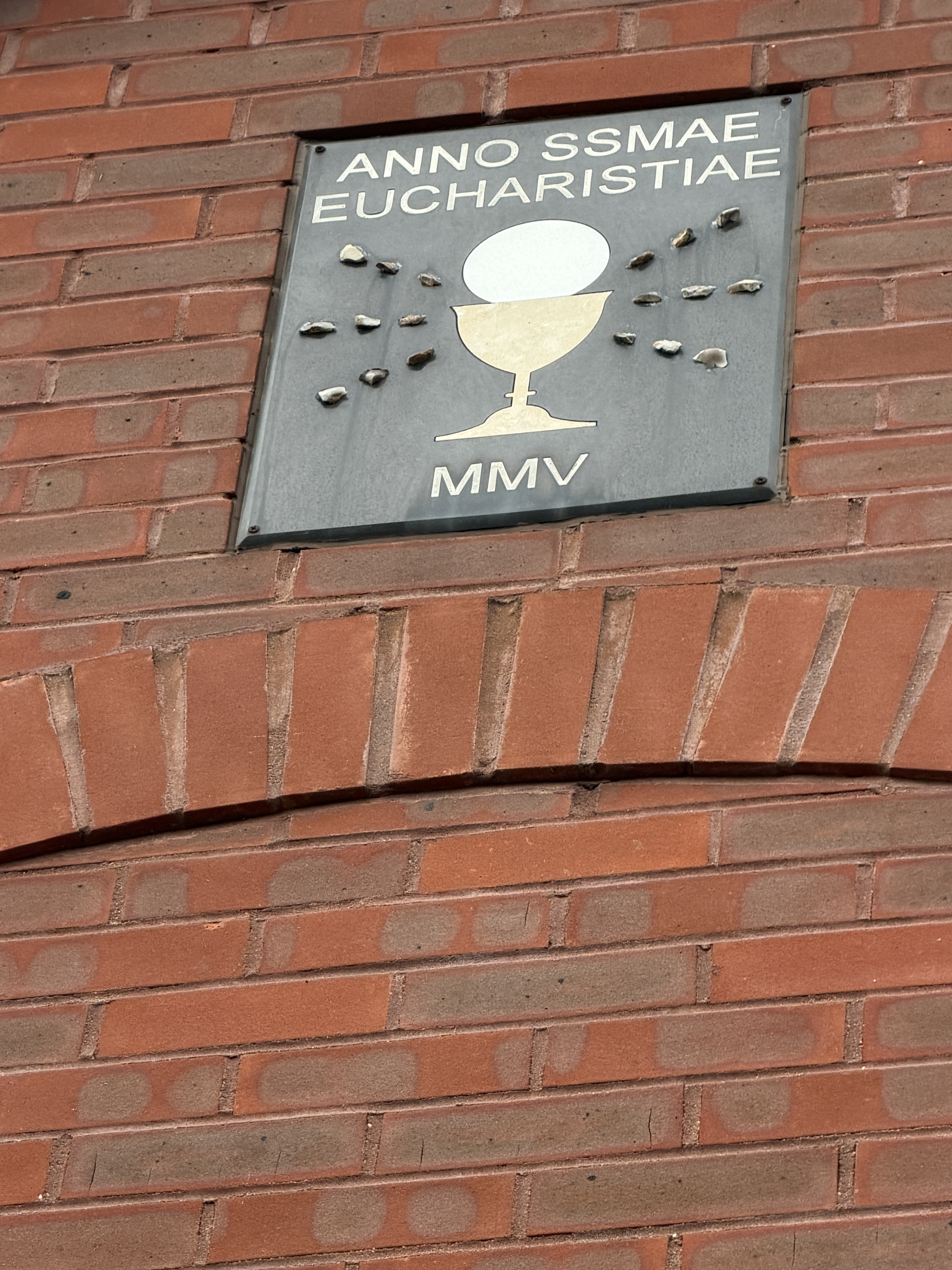
Plaque on church in south London

The Year of the Eucharist is the name of the liturgical year from October 2004 to October 2005, as celebrated by Catholics worldwide. On 10 June 2004 Pope John Paul II announced the dedication of an entire year to the Blessed Sacrament and invited the entire Church to reflect upon the Eucharist.

== Opening the Year ==
Pope John Paul II stated that the idea came from scheduled events to take place in the following liturgical year. The International Eucharistic Congress was scheduled for 10 to 17 October 2004 and would mark the opening of Year of the Eucharist. The year would close with the Ordinary Assembly of the Synod of Bishops, held from 2 to 29 October 2005.

He stated that the World Youth Day 2005 was another consideration in his decision of the dedication. He said, "I would like the young people to gather around the Eucharist as the vital source which nourishes their faith and enthusiasm."

Specifically how the year was to be celebrated was left to the particular Churches. However, Pope John Paul II offered some basic guidelines. Suggestions were also presented by the Congregation for Divine Worship and the Discipline of the Sacraments. In the United States, many dioceses encouraged local parishes to conduct celebrations, to examine the place of the Eucharist in parish life, to encourage Eucharistic adoration separate from the Mass, and to evaluate how Eucharistic adoration is conducted locally. Many Bishops took the time to encourage their local parishes to institute 40-hour devotions.

== Goals of the Year of the Eucharist ==
Pope John Paul II made several suggestions to the Church in order to help the faithful benefit from the Year of the Eucharist. He called on Catholics to understand the Eucharist as "an urgent summons to testimony and evangelization," providing the necessary strength to carry out the "charge" given at the end of each Mass to spread the Gospel. John Paul II also asked for a commitment to a "culture of the Eucharist," i.e. a commitment to providing witness to God's real presence in the world.

Another reflection offered by Pope John Paul II is that of the meaning of the word Eucharist: Thanksgiving. John Paul II said, "In Jesus, in his sacrifice, in his unconditional 'yes' to the will of the Father, is contained the 'yes', the 'thank you' and the 'amen' of all humanity." He asked for a commitment to giving thanks to God, which he called a "'Eucharistic' attitude."

== Notable events ==
Among the many reflections published in honor of the year, Archbishop Alfred C. Hughes' of the Archdiocese of New Orleans wrote, "On this side of heaven, one cannot experience a more substantial or intense communion with Christ's presence than in the Eucharist." This year also saw the death of Pope John Paul II on 2 April 2005 (the one who established the year itself), and the subsequent election of Pope Benedict XVI on 19 April 2005.

There was an Eucharistic Congress in the Basilica of the National Shrine of the Immaculate Conception in Washington, D.C., on 25 September 2004, the homily was given by Cardinal Francis Arinze, prefect of the Congregation for Divine Worship. The closing Mass was attended by 3,000 Catholics.
