= 8th National Eucharistic Congress (United States) =

1938 Catholic event in New Orleans

Eighth National Eucharistic Congress
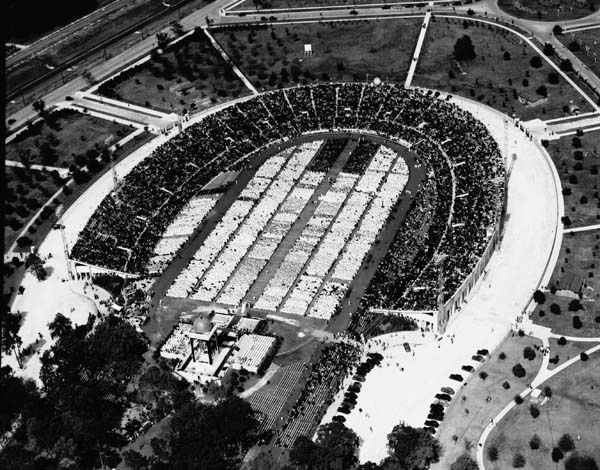
- Aerial view of City Park Stadium filled with worshippers
- Date: October 17–20, 1938
- Duration: 4 days
- Venue: City Park Stadium
- Location: New Orleans, Louisiana, U.S.; 29°59′22″N 90°5′58″W
- Type: Eucharistic congress
- Papal envoy: George Cardinal Mundelein

The Eighth National Eucharistic Congress was a Roman Catholic eucharistic congress held from October 17–20, 1938 in the U.S. city of New Orleans, Louisiana, meant to foster devotion to the sacrament of the Eucharist. The congress was held in City Park Stadium. Archbishop of Chicago George Mundelein, a cardinal, served as a special papal legate for the congress.

== Congress ==
Prior to the event, the New Orleans Council of Catholic Women collected donations to construct a monstrance. The monstrance was completed at a cost of $30,000 (equivalent to $690,000 in 2025) and made of gold with burgundy velour draping.

Many of the congress's addresses were broadcast nationwide over both the NBC Radio Red Network and Blue Network.

=== Opening ceremonies ===
Pope Pius XI opened the Congress with a six-minute address over radio, stating that while he wept at the evils caused by the wickedness of men spurning and rejecting the gospel, he saw "a promise of better things for the universal church" in the "daily increases of ardent devotion of the august sacrament of the altar."

The opening Pontifical High Mass—attended by 50,000 people, including 60 bishops—was celebrated by Cardinal Mundelein while a blimp floated overhead. Cardinal Mundelein's opening address declared that the world must return to God to avoid another world war.

James Farley, United States Postmaster General, read remarks from U.S. president Franklin D. Roosevelt, who said, "I doubt if there is any problem in the world today—social, political, or economic—that would not find happy solution if approached in the spirit of the Sermon on the Mount."

=== Other events ===
Speakers at the congress condemned Nazism, racism, communism, fascism, naturalism, and materialism. Archbishop John Joseph Mitty of San Francisco preached that the salvation of the world depends on the Blessed Sacrament.

On October 19, a Maronite Holy Qurobo was celebrated in Aramaic by Fr. Elias Nagem of San Antonio, Texas, for the Syrian and Palestinian population of New Orleans. The Mass for youth was celebrated by Archbishop Edward Howard, and preached by Bishop Bernard Sheil. More than 150 people, mostly children, fainted when attempting to attend the Mass.

The 2.7-mile (4.3 km) closing procession was marched in by 80,000 people, including 18,000 children. From the gondola of the Goodyear Blimp Reliance, Rev. Joseph Bassich, SJ, sang hymns projected down to the crowd via loudspeakers.

The congress formally closed with benediction at the Cathedral-Basilica of Saint Louis, King of France.
