= Cathedral Basilica of St. Peter in Chains =

- U.S. National Register of Historic Places
- Cincinnati Local Historic Landmark
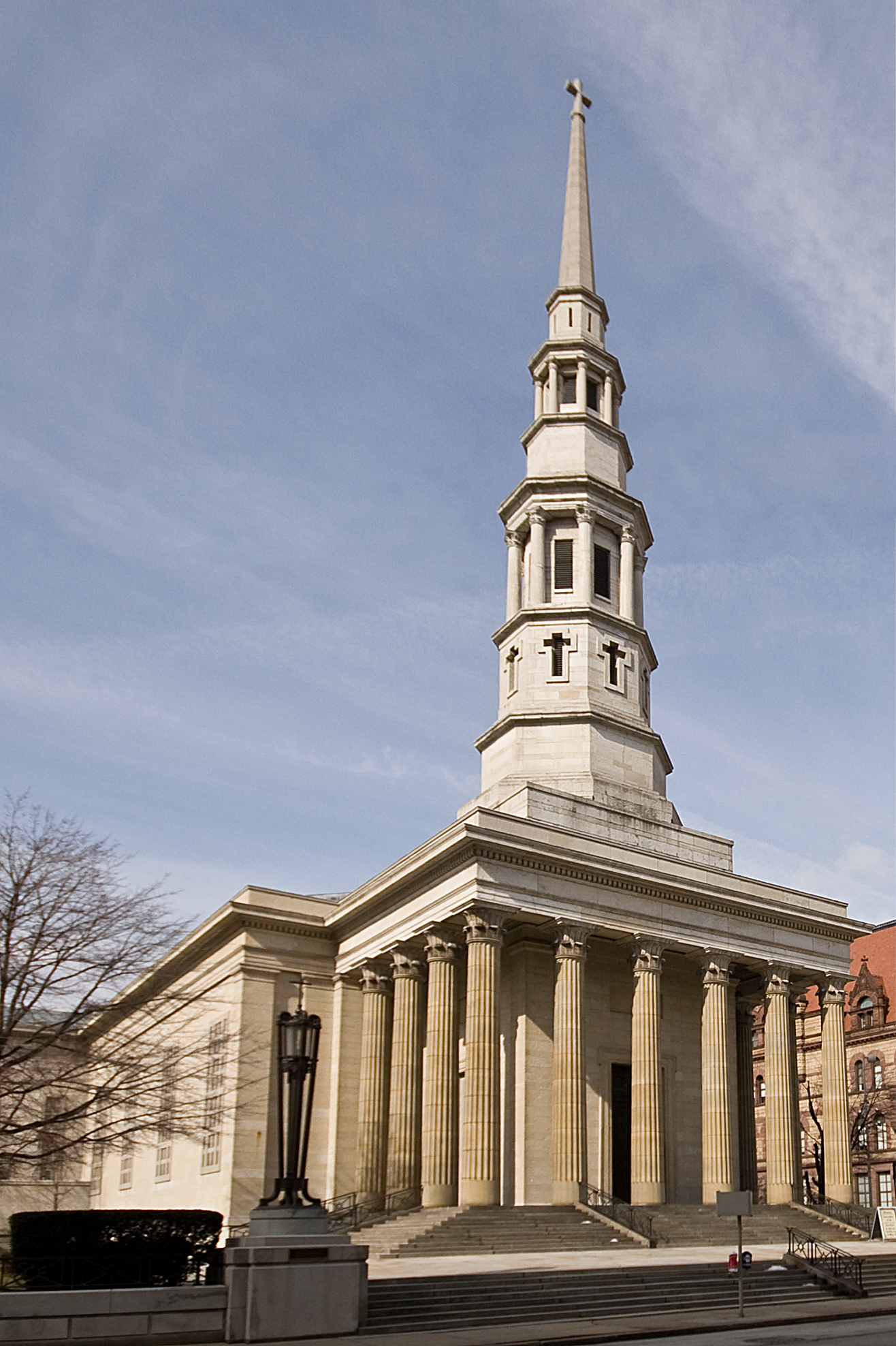
- Cathedral Basilica of St. Peter in Chains
- Location: Cincinnati, Ohio
- Coordinates: 39°6′13.89″N 84°31′8.70″W
- Built: 1841-1845
- Architect: Henry Walter
- NRHP reference No.: 73001469
- Added to NRHP: January 18, 1973

The Cathedral Basilica of Saint Peter in Chains is a Catholic cathedral of the Latin Church in the Archdiocese of Cincinnati. The cathedral is a Greek Revival structure located at 8th and Plum streets in downtown Cincinnati, Ohio, United States. It is dedicated to Saint Peter's imprisonment and liberation in Rome.

The cathedral's cornerstone was laid in 1841 by Bishop John Baptist Purcell, who dedicated it in 1845. The cathedral was the first large church west of the Allegheny Mountains. The cathedral was designated a minor basilica in 2020.

== History ==
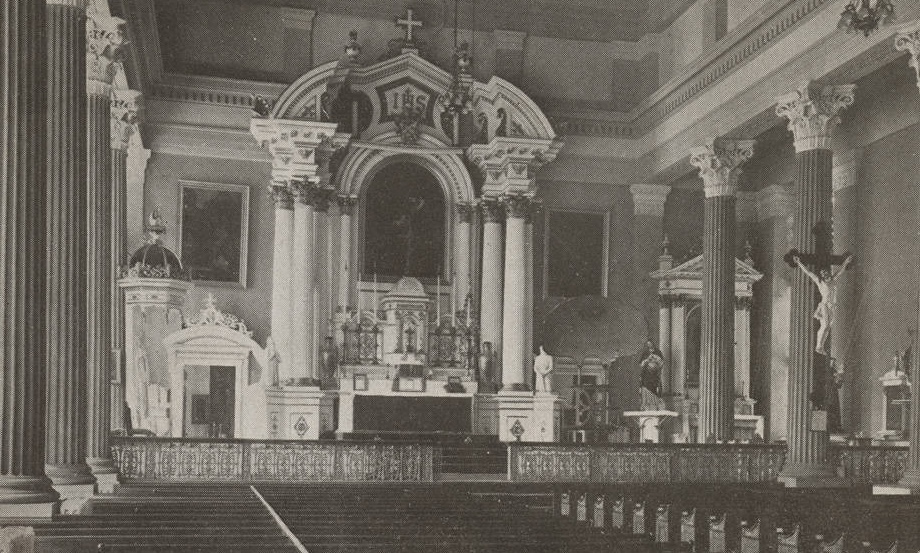
Altar, St. Peter in Chains (1920)

=== 1826 to 1900 ===
In 1826, five years after Pope Pius VII erected the Diocese of Cincinnati, Bishop Edward Fenwick dedicated the first St. Peter's Cathedral in Cincinnati. It was located at what is now St. Francis Xavier Church. By the 1840s, the massive growth of the Catholic population in Southern Ohio had rendered St. Peter's obsolete. In December 1840, Bishop John Baptist Purcell purchased a lot on Plum Street in Cincinnati for a new cathedral. He laid the cornerstone for the new cathedral in May 1841.

Four years later, on November 2, 1845, Purcell consecrated the Cathedral of Saint Peter in Chains. In the late 1840s, the archdiocese commissioned the Italian sculptor Odoardo Fantacchiotti to create two Cararra Marble statues for the sanctuary, Adoring Angel (1849) and Praying Angel (1848). The diocese later donated the two sculptures to the Cincinnati Museum of Art.

In 1855, the archdiocese completed the front portico of the cathedral and added gas lighting to the building. The cathedral was closed for repairs in 1862. At that time. the archdiocese also constructed a grand colonnade in the nave along with an arch above the altar. The cathedral underwent its first major renovation in 1871. The archdiocese removed two side sacristies to enlarge the sanctuary, added two stained glass windows and installed marble enhancements on the altar. The next year, the heating system was replaced.

A celebration of Purcell's 50th anniversary of his ordination was held at St. Peter in Chains in 1876. His funeral mass took place there in 1883. In 1890, the cathedral hosted the Congress of American Colored Catholics. The archdiocese installed electric lights in 1898 and a new organ in 1899.

=== 1900 to present ===
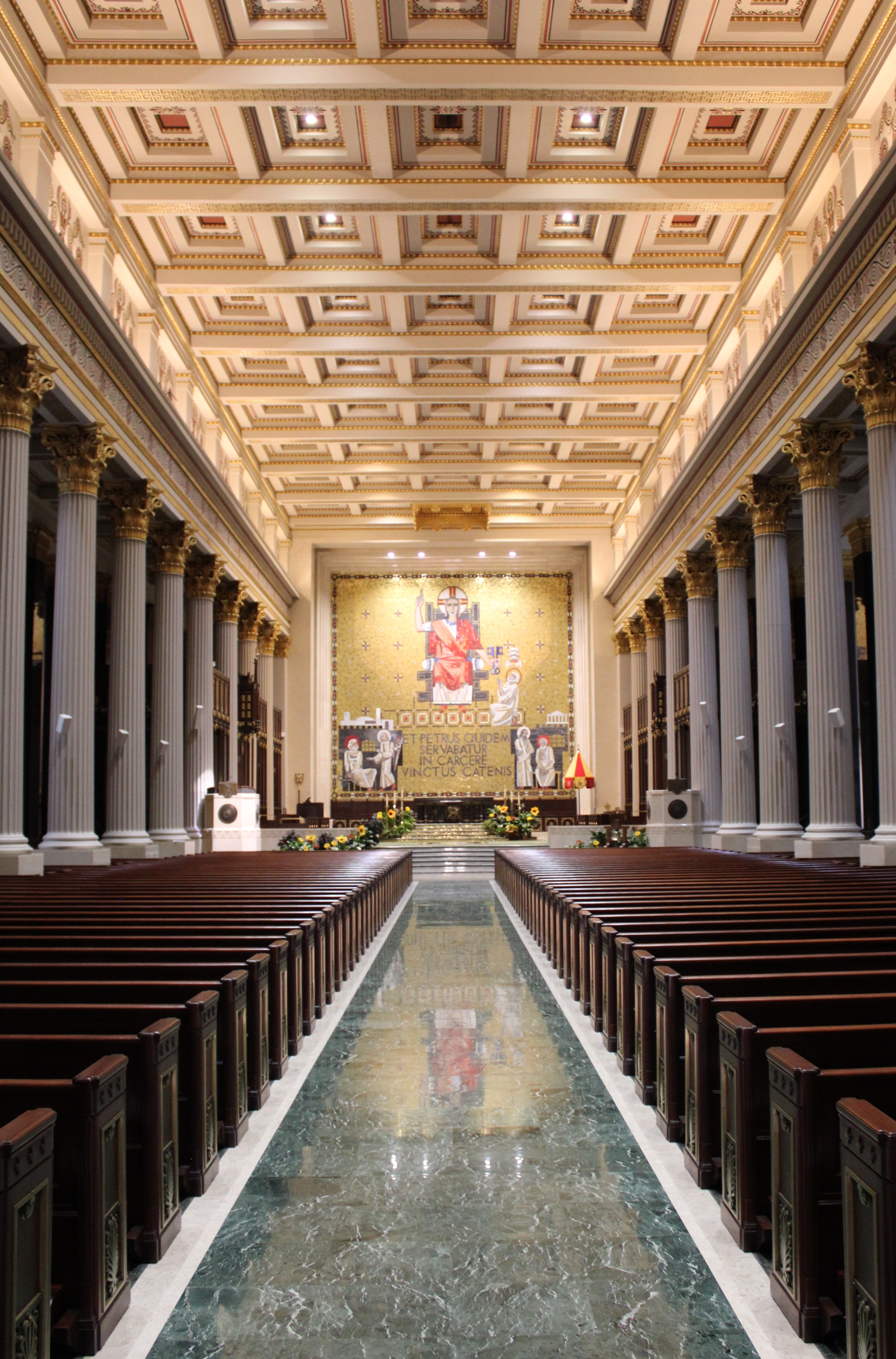
Nave, St. Peter in Chains Cathedral (2023)

The cathedral hosted masses and talks for the 5th National Eucharistic Congress in 1911. After the American entry into World War I in April 1917, the archdiocese arranged a retreat at the cathedral for 600 men who had enlisted in the U.S. Army. During the Ohio River flood of 1937, the cathedral parish organized a Red Cross unit to assist those left homeless. By 1938, St. Peter in Chains was in such bad shape that Archbishop John T. McNicholas moved the archdiocesan seat to St. Monica's Church in the Clifton Heights neighborhood. St. Peter in Chains now became a parish church.

In 1951, Archbishop Karl Joseph Alter announced a five-year restoration and expansion for St. Peter in Chains. Architect Edward J. Schulte designed new transepts, a rectory, a sacristy, and archdiocesan offices. Contractors in February 1937 installed 12 new bells in the spire. Later that year, they installed a new high altar and new altars in the Blessed Sacrament Chapel. Alter re-dedicated St. Peter in Chains as a cathedral on November 3, 1957.

A memorial service was held at the cathedral in December 1963 for US President John F. Kennedy, who had been assassinated in Dallas, Texas, the previous month. A similar service was held in April 1968 for Dr. Martin Luther King Jr., who was shot and killed in Memphis, Tennessee, that month. In June 1974, Mother Teresa visited the cathedral to receive the Peace Prize from the North American Federation of the Third Order of St. Francis.In 1976, the cathedral hosted Polish Archbishop Karol Wojtyla, who two years later was elected Pope John Paul II. In October 2018, the cathedral held an exhibition of the relics of the Italian priest Padre Pio, attracting thousands of visitors. Pope Francis in June 2020 designated the cathedral as a minor basilica.

== Architecture ==
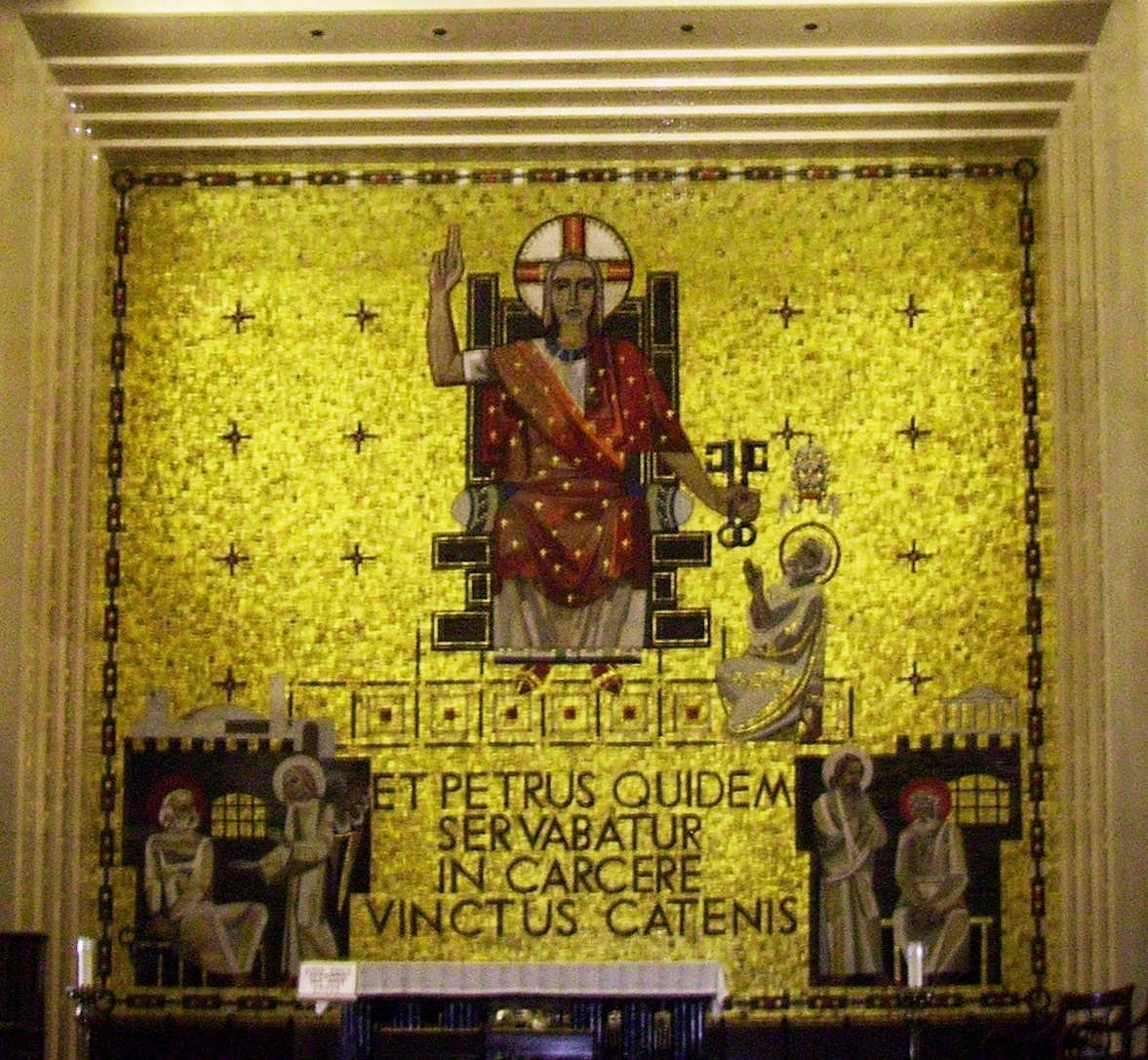
Mosaic in nave, St. Peter in Chains Cathedral (2008)

St. Peter in Chains has a single spire made of white limestone that rises 224 feet (68 m) above street level. For many decades, the spire made the basilica the tallest structure in Cincinnati. The columns on the front portico are 33 feet (10 m) high, symbolizing the number of years in Jesus' life.

The first tower bells were dedicated in 1851. The next year, the archdiocese installed a clock that would play music using the bells every three hours. It was replaced in 1930. Twelve Dutch bells were added to the tower in 1957 and the entire system was refurbished in 2010.

A massive mosaic fills the apse at the rear wall of the sanctuary. Composed of Venetian glass, the mosaic is 35 feet (11 m) high and 40 feet (12 m) wide. It was created by the German artist Anton Wendling. The mosaics show a young Christ sitting on a throne, his right hand giving a blessing. At his feet is the Apostle Peter, receiving the keys of authority from Christ's left hand. There are two scenes at the bottom of the mosaic. One scene shows the Apostle Paul visiting Peter in prison in Rome, the other scene showing an angel unchaining Peter.

The cathedral flooring is a dark green marble, with white marble designs. The marble all originated from Italy, replacing the original oak flooring. The Corinthian columns around the altar are made of a French blue marble.

== Artworks ==
- A replica of Michelangelo's Pieta is located in the baptistery. It was purchased for the cathedral by its benefactors.
- The cathedral owns a missal stand from 15th or 16th century Spain. It belonged to Cardinal Ximenes de Cisneros, private chaplain to Queen Isabella I of Castile. It is made of oak with ivory inserts.
- A processional cross use by the cathedral is fitted with a corpus, or figure, of Christ that was made by the Italian goldsmith Benvenuto Cellini in the 16th century.
- The walls of the nave contain a series of murals depicting the stations of the cross. These were painted by the American artist Carl Zimmerman.

== See also ==
- List of cathedrals in Ohio
- List of Catholic cathedrals in the United States
- List of cathedrals in the United States
