= Louis Gaston Adrien de Ségur =

French bishop (1820–1881)

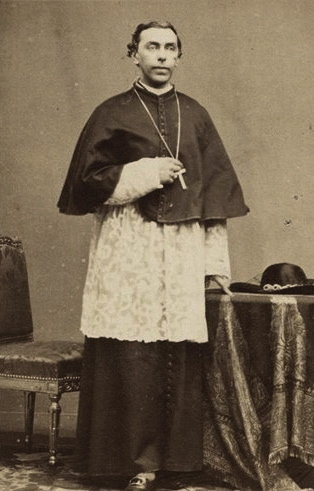

Louis Gaston Adrien de Ségur (April 15, 1820 – June 9, 1881) was a French bishop and charitable pioneer.

de Ségur became a prelate of the papal court, and canon-bishop of Saint-Denis.

In 1881 he organized the first formal Eucharistic Congress in Lille France which was approved by Pope Leo XIII and was attended by 40,000 people.

== Works ==
- (1851). Réponses courtes et familières aux objections les plus répandues contre la religion.
- (1855). Quelques mots sur Rome, adressés aux soldats de l'armée d'occupation.
- (1856). Qu'est-ce que Jésus-Christ? Considérations familières sur la personne, la vie et le mystère du Christ.
- (1856). Jésus-Christ? Considérations familières sur la personne, la vie et le mystère du Christ.
- (1857). Petite dissertation sur la lampe du Saint-Sacrement.
- (1857). La Religion enseignée aux petits enfants.
- (1858). Causeries familières sur le protestantisme d'aujourd'hui.
- (1858). Prie-Dieu pour l'adoration du Saint-Sacrement.
- (1860). Le Pape, questions à l'ordre du jour.
- (1860). La Très sainte communion.
- (1861). Y a-t-il un Dieu qui s'occupe de nous.
- (1861). La Passion de N.-S. Jésus-Christ.
- (1861). La Révolution.
- (1861). Le Denier de Saint Pierre.
- (1861). L'Eglise.
- (1862). Divinité de N.S. Jésus-Christ, ou Jésus-Christ est-il un Dieu?
- (1862). La Confession.
- (1862). Les Pâques.
- (1863). Le Souverain Pontife.
- (1864). Aux enfants. Conseils pratiques sur la confession.
- (1864). Aux enfants. Conseils pratiques sur la communion.
- (1864). Questions à l'ordre du jour. La Divinité de Jésus-Christ.
- (1864). Instructions familières et lectures du soir sur toutes les vérités de la religion.
- (1864–66). La Pitié et la vie intérieure, par Mgr de Ségur.
- (1865). Aux enfants. Conseils pratiques sur les tentations et le péché.
- (1865). Aux enfants. L'enfant Jésus.
- (1865). Aux enfants. Conseils pratiques sur la prière.
- (1865). Aux enfants. Conseils pratiques sur la piété.
- (1865). A tous les gens de bonne foi. Les objections populaires contre l'Encyclique.
- (1865). Grosses vérités.
- (1866). Au soldat en temps de guerre.
- (1866). La piété enseignée aux enfants.
- (1866). La présence réelle.
- (1867). Aux étudiants et à tous les gens d'esprit. La Foi devant la science moderne.
- (1867). Les Francs-maçons, ce qu'ils sont, ce qu'ils font, ce qu'ils veulent.
- (1867). La Sainte Vierge. Lectures pieuses pour les réunions du mois de Marie, par Mgr de Ségur.
- (1868). Les Volontaires de la Prière.
- (1868). Le Tiers-ordre de Saint-François.
- (1869). Le Concile.
- (1869). Les Saints Mystères, explications familières des cérémonies de la Messe.
- (1869). La Grande question du jour. La liberté.
- (1870). Aux enfants. Une petite sainte de neuf ans.
- (1870). Aux enfants chrétiens. Mois de Marie.
- (1870). Le Pape est infaillible. Opuscule populaire.
- (1871). De la Liberté religieuse pour nos soldats.
- (1871). A ceux qui souffrent.
- (1871). Prêtres et Nobles.
- (1871). Les volontaires de la prière.
- (1871). Les Merveilles de Lourdes.
- (1871). Vive le Roi!
- (1871). Lettre de Mgr de Ségur à M. Louis Veuillot.
- (1872). Pie IX et ses noces d'or.
- (1872). Aux apprentis, avis et conseils.
- (1872). Le Sacré-Cœur de Jésus. Mois du Sacré-Coeur.
- (1872). Le Dogme de l'infaillibilité.
- (1873). Aux pères et mères. L'École sans Dieu.
- (1874). Le Bon combat de la foi.
- (1874). Hommage aux jeunes catholiques libéraux.
- (1874). La France au pied du Saint-Sacrement.
- (1875). Le Cordon de Saint François.
- (1875). La lampe du Saint-Sacrement.
- (1875). A tous les braves gens. Les ennemis des curés, ce qu'ils sont, ce qu'ils disent.
- (1875). Ma mère souvenir de sa vie et de sa sainte mort.
- (1875). Le Cordon séraphique. Ses merveilleuses richesses.
- (1875). Je crois.
- (1875–6). Le jeune ouvrier chrétien, petites directions spirituelles à l'usage des jeunes gens.
- (1876). L'Enfer. S'il y en a un.
- (1876). Les Merveilles de Sainte-Anne d'Auray.
- (1877). Venez tous à moi.
- (1877). Tous les huit jours.
- (1877). Le Séraphique Saint-François, merveilles de sa vie.
- (1882). Cent cinquante beaux Miracles de Notre-Dame de Lourdes.
- (1882). Journal d'un voyage en Italie.
- (1895). Aux Infirmes et aux affligés.
