= Priests' Eucharistic League =

The Priests' Eucharistic League (Confraternitas sacerdotalis adorationis Sanctissimi Sacramenti) was a Roman Catholic confraternity set up in the nineteenth century, with primary object the frequent and prolonged worship of the Blessed Sacrament by priests.

The confraternity was originally intended for members of the secular clergy only; but as far back as 1898 the admission of members of religious orders was authorized; and by a concession of the superior general of the Congregation of the Blessed Sacrament dated 2 November 1902, seminarists in the United States became eligible for admission even before receiving the subdiaconate.

== History ==
It was established in Paris by Pierre-Julien Eymard, founder of the Congregation of the Blessed Sacrament. Already in 1857 he had wanted to adapt his work of Eucharistic adoration as would attract the clergy. to a more intimate and constant intercourse with the sacramental Lord. It was not until 1867 that the plan of a distinct confraternity was matured.

The association assumed its mature form in 1879, received the approval of Pope Leo XIII on 25 January 1881, and six years later, on 16 January 1887, was definitively approved and canonically erected by Cardinal Parocchi, cardinal vicar, in the church of S. Claudio in Rome. To this church was attached the Archconfraternity of the Most Holy Sacrament, and it was the canonical centre of the Priests' Eucharistic League; but the office of the central administration of the league was at the house of the fathers of the Congregation of the Most Holy Sacrament, Brussels.

== Works of the association ==
The specified works of the association were the following:

- (1) to spend each week one full and continuous hour of adoration before the Blessed Sacrament exposed on the altar or veiled in the tabernacle;
- (2) to report monthly to the local director on a prescribed schedule (libellus) the performance of the above undertaking;
- (3) to apply once a month the indulgences attached to the hour of adoration for the benefit of the souls of members who may have died during the previous month;
- (4) to offer the Holy Sacrifice once a year for all deceased members of the association.

== See also ==
- Confraternities of Priests
