= Marie-Marthe-Baptistine Tamisier =

French lay woman (1834–1910)

Marie-Marthe-Baptistine Tamisier (1 November 1834 in Tours – 20 June 1910 in Tours) was the lay organiser of a number of International Eucharistic Congresses in the last quarter of the 19th century.

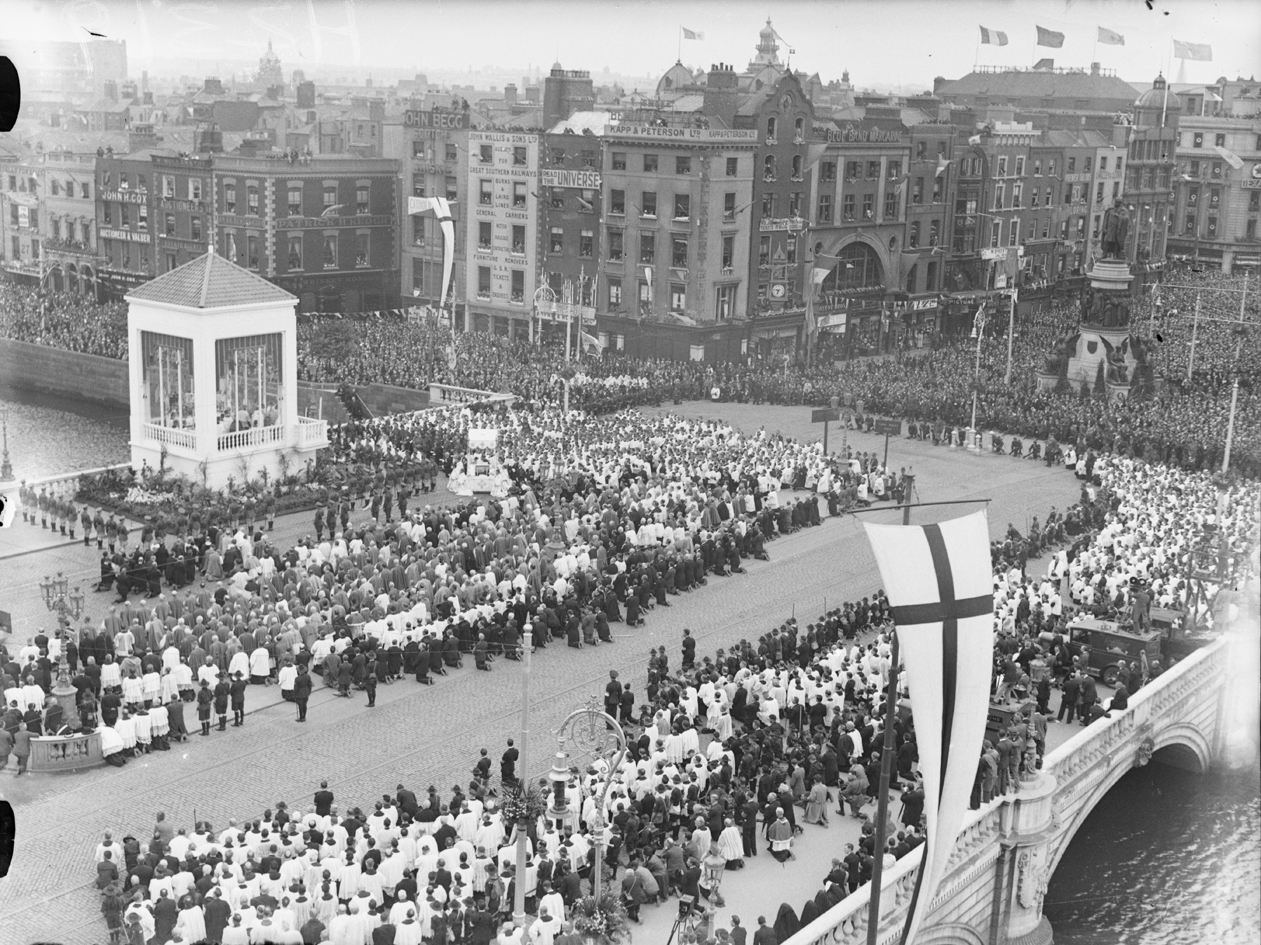
Eucharistic Congress - Dublin - June 1932 -Benediction on the Bridge

== Historical context ==
The rise of liberal free-thinking in France during the second half of the 18th century, which led to the French Revolution, continued throughout the reign of Napoleon. As a result, fifty years of neglect eventually took its toll, and in the 1840s a number of movements, predominantly local initiatives amongst lay female worshippers, were set up to restore the material fittings of churches in Northern France and Belgium. Under the guidance of the Papal Nuncio, Count Gioacchino Pecci (later Pope Leo XIII), Anna, the eldest daughter of the Belgian Minister of Finance, Count Ferdinand de Meeus, set up an unofficial Sisterhood which acquired a very old Eucharistic chapel in Brussels as its base. This established a link between the restoration of the Church as a matter of repentance and Eucharistic adoration, and the support of the local Cardinals soon set a full-fledged revival going.

At the same time, the creation of the railway network in the second quarter of the 19th century facilitated the mobility of the general population, and one beneficiary of this was religion. In the UK, Thomas Cook started his business in support of adherents to a revival in religious fundamentalism, and pilgrimage similarly became a much easier proposition for French Catholics.

== Life ==
M^{lle} Tamisier was born at Tours, 1 November, 1834. In 1847 she became a pupil of the Religious of the Sacred Heart at Marmoutier, remaining there four years, and thereafter fell into the circle of Peter Julian Eymard, a priest from Lyon who had changed the orientation of his vocation towards Eucharistic worship. This was however a period during which the Rissorgimento had virtually frozen all overt Vatican activity, and much irregular activity was approved at Diocesional levels. Following the death of the latter in 1868, in 1871 she moved to Ars in eastern France in the hopes that the supernatural powers of vocational discernment associated with the Blessed Jean Vianney, a friend of Eymard's who lived and is buried there, would guide her. Coming under the direction of Abbé Chevrier of Lyon, with the help of Mgr de Ségur and François-Marie-Benjamin Richard de la Vergne, then Bishop of Belley, in 1873 she started organising pilgrimages to sanctuaries where Eucharistic miracles had taken place, and their success led to Eucharistic congresses.

Her first pilgrimage was to Avignon on Easter Monday 1874, then to Douai in 1875. Another pilgrimage to Paris also happened in 1875. A further pilgrimage to Faverney in 1878 gained the support of the newly enthroned Pope Leo, whose encouragement led her to organise the first Eucharistic Congress in Lille, 28-31 June 1881. Her initial plan was to hold this in Liège, the origin of the Feast of Corpus Christi in the 13th Century, but Belgian political machinations made this impossible. Her privations early in life took their toll, and she then effectively retired to Issoudun. All her spare means, though often depriving herself, she devoted to the education of poor aspirants to the priesthood.

M^{lle} Tarnisier died in 1910 at the age of 75.

Although M^{lle} Tamisier received little credit for her efforts during her lifetime, after her death her importance in the revival of Adoration and pilgrimage became more appreciated.

== Eucharistic Congresses ==
Eucharistic congresses are regional, national, and international gatherings honoring Jesus Christ in the Eucharist. Conferences, celebrations and devotions are focused on Jesus and the Eucharist. The highlight of the congresses are generally the solemn procession and final celebration of the Eucharist (Mass). The first international congress was held in 1881 in Lille, France. Shortly thereafter a Permanent Commission for International Eucharistic Congresses was set up. Pius XI attended the Congress in Rome in 1922 and determined they should be held every two years. (They had been held annually.) At present, they convene every four years.

== Sources ==
- Les Voies de Dieu, Un Jubilé Eucharistique dans l'Église expiatoire du Três Saint Sacrament de Miracle â Bruxelles 1848-1898. By: Jean Thys (?) Pub: Société de Saint Augustin, Desclée, de Brouwer et Cie 1898
