= Robert William Donnelly =

Catholic Bishop

The Most Reverend Robert W. Donnelly
- Auxiliary Bishop of Toledo
- Church: Catholic Church
- See: Titular See of Garba
- In office: May 3, 1984 - May 30, 2006

Orders
- Ordination: May 25, 1957
- Consecration: May 3, 1984 by James Robert Hoffman

Personal details
- Born: March 22, 1931 Toledo, Ohio
- Died: July 21, 2014 (aged 83) Toledo, Ohio

Robert W. Donnelly (March 22, 1931 – July 21, 2014) was an American Bishop of the Catholic Church. He served as an auxiliary bishop of the Diocese of Toledo from 1984 to 2006.

== Biography ==
Born in Toledo, Ohio, Robert William Donnelly was ordained a priest for the Diocese of Toledo on May 25, 1957. On March 14, 1984, Pope John Paul II appointed him as the Titular Bishop of Garba and Auxiliary Bishop of Toledo. He was consecrated by Bishop James Robert Hoffman on May 3, 1984. The principal co-consecrators were Archbishop Daniel Pilarczyk of Cincinnati and Bishop Emeritus John Donovan of Toledo. He continued to serve as an auxiliary bishop until his resignation was accepted by Pope Benedict XVI on May 30, 2006.
