= Carl K. Moeddel =

American prelate of the Roman Catholic Church

His Excellency, The Most Reverend Carl Kevin Moeddel
- Auxiliary Bishop of Cincinnati; Titular Bishop of Bistue
- Archdiocese: Cincinnati
- Other post: Titular Bishop of Bistue

Orders
- Ordination: May 14, 1969 by Karl Joseph Alter
- Consecration: August 24, 1993 by Daniel Edward Pilarczyk

Personal details
- Born: December 28, 1937 Cincinnati, Ohio, US
- Died: August 25, 2009 (aged 71) Cincinnati
- Education: Athenaeum of Ohio
- Motto: Be reconciled

Styles of Carl K. Moeddel
- Reference style: The Most Reverend
- Spoken style: Your Excellency
- Religious style: Monsignor

Carl Kevin Moeddel (December 28, 1937 – August 25, 2009) was an American prelate of the Roman Catholic Church. He served as an auxiliary bishop of the Archdiocese of Cincinnati in Ohio from 1993 to 2007.

== Biography ==
=== Early life ===
Carl Moeddel was born on December 28, 1937, in Cincinnati, Ohio, to Carl H. and Florence E. (née Pohlking) Moeddel. As a child, Carl attended the St. Aloysius School in Cincinnati. Deciding to become a priest, Moeddel entered Saint Gregory Seminary, the minor seminary in Cincinnati. Moeddel continued his studies at the Athenaeum of Ohio, where he obtained Bachelor of Arts and Master of Arts degrees.

=== Priesthood ===
Moeddel was ordained to the priesthood at St. Peter in Chains Cathedral in Cincinnati by Archbishop Karl Alter for the Archdiocese of Cincinnati on August 15, 1962. After his ordination, the archdiocese in 1963 assigned Moeddel as assistant pastor of St. Louis Parish in Cincinnati, as well as assistant chancellor and assistant treasurer of the archdiocese. At some point, Moeddel earned a Master of Divinity degree from the Athenaeum

Moeddel was named executive secretary of the archdiocesan Commission on Ecumenical and Interfaith Relations in 1970, director of the Continuing Education of Priests in 1971, vicar of Ecumenical and Interfaith Relations in 1973, and vice chancellor in 1975. Moeddel served as president of the Ohio Council of Churches in 1973.

In 1976, Moeddel was named as pastor of St. Peter in Chains Cathedral. During this period, he also worked as dean of the Cathedral Deanery, the director of finance, the vicar for finance and chair of the Financial Council. He was named pastor of St. James of the Valley Church in Wyoming, Ohio, in 1985.

=== Auxiliary Bishop of Cincinnati ===
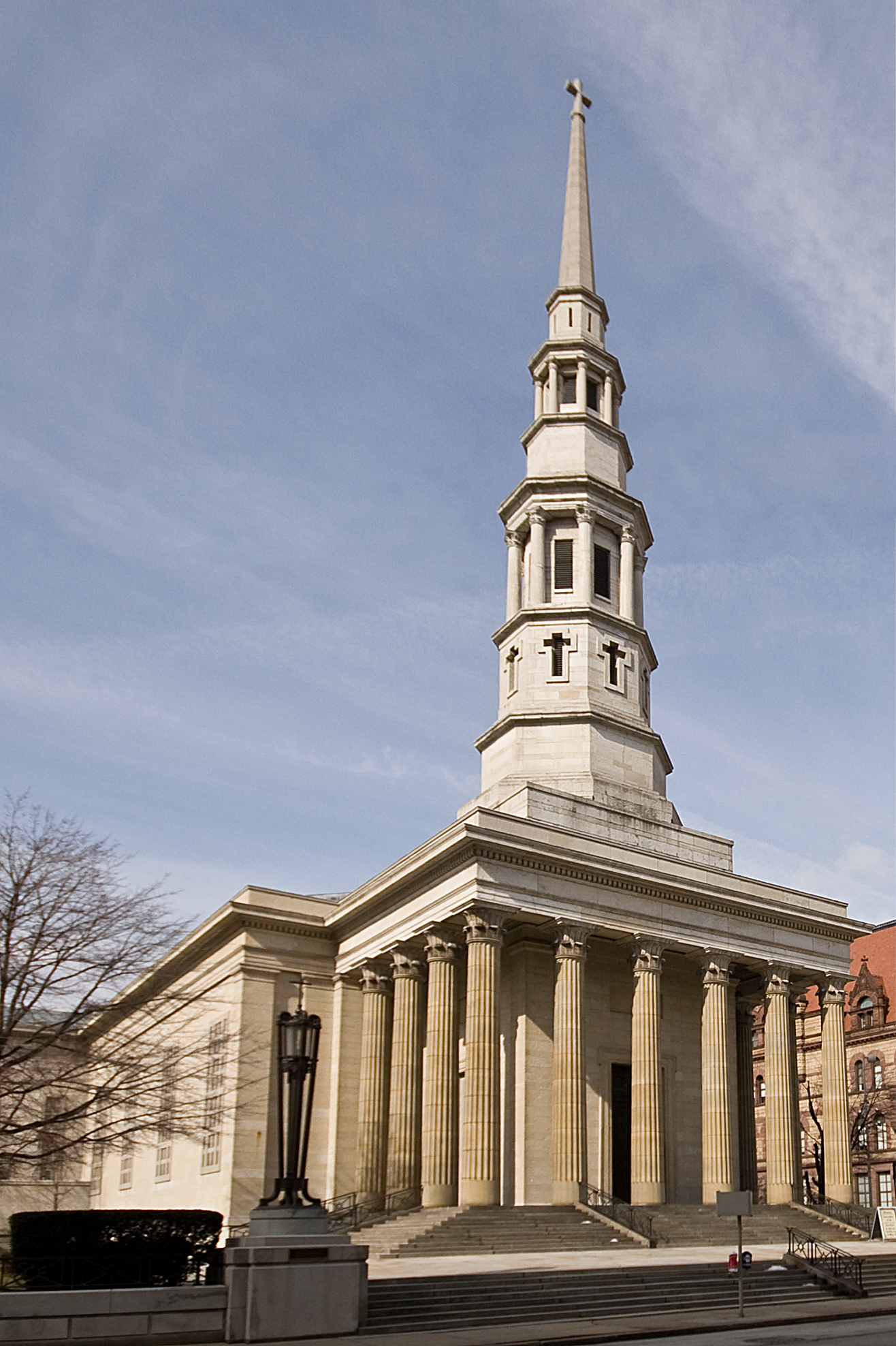
St. Peter in Chain Cathedral, Cincinnati, Ohio (2008)

On June 15, 1993, Moeddel was appointed auxiliary bishop of Cincinnati and titular bishop of Bistue by Pope John Paul II. He received his episcopal consecration on August 24, 1993, at St. Peter in Chains Cathedral from Archbishop Daniel Pilarczyk, with Archbishop Edward McCarthy and Bishop James Garland serving as co-consecrators. Moeddel selected as his episcopal motto: "Be Reconciled."

As an auxiliary bishop, Moeddel served as vicar general of the archdiocese and director of the Pastoral Services Department and Priest Personnel Office.

=== Retirement and death ===
Moeddel resigned as auxiliary bishop of Cincinnati for health reasons on June 20, 2007, having been diagnosed with vascular dementia connected with previous strokes and diabetes. He died on August 25, 2009 after a long illness in Cincinnati, aged 71.
