= Thienpont =

Thienpont is a surname. Notable people with the surname include:

- Emiel Thienpont (1904–1978), Belgian swimmer
- Emmanuel Thienpont (1803–1873), Belgian-born American Catholic priest
- Hugo Thienpont (born 1961), Belgian engineer
- Jean Thienpont (1774–1863), Belgian politician
