= Saint Joseph Central Catholic High School (Fremont, Ohio) =

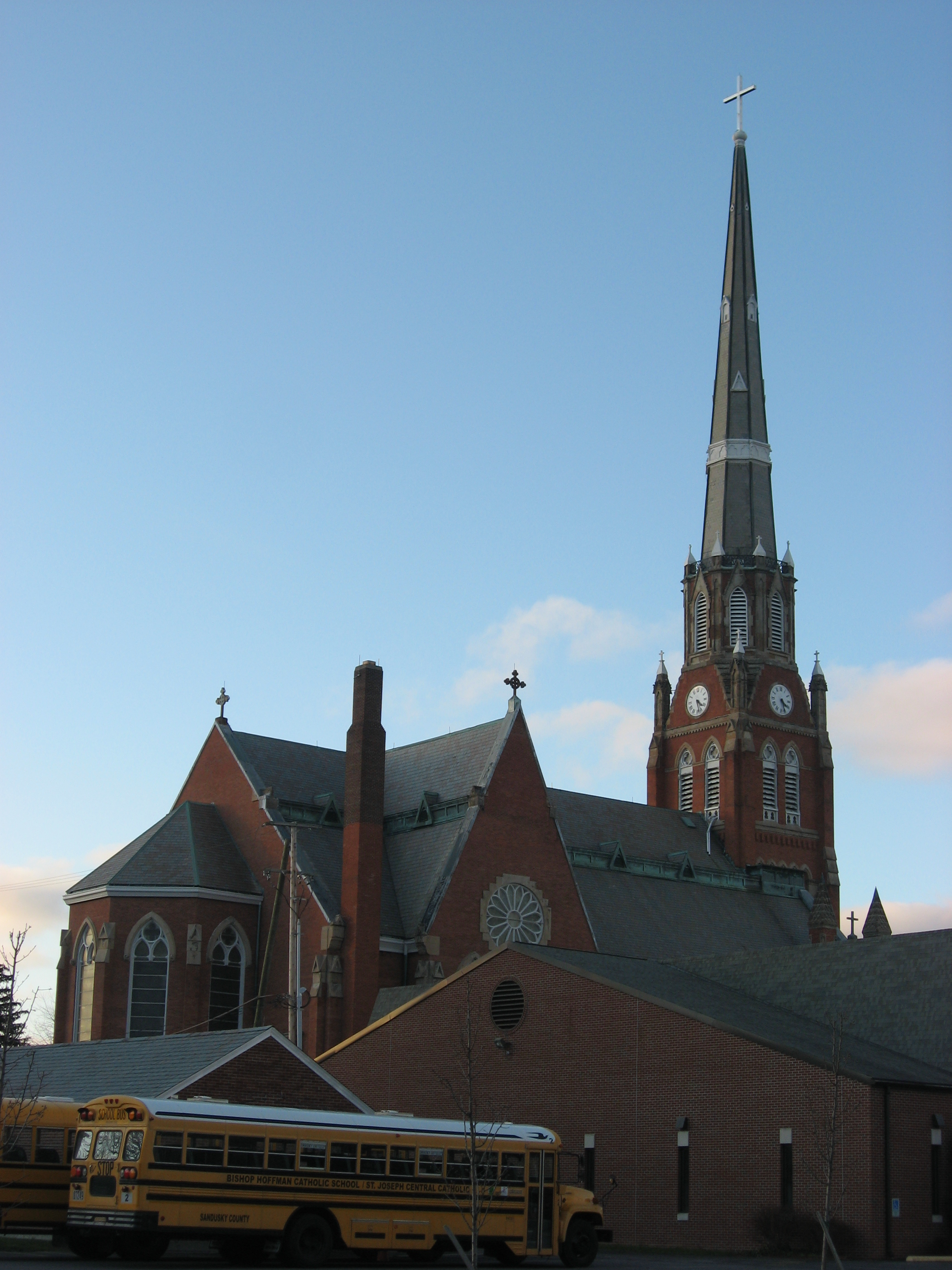
- St. Joseph's Catholic Church, which is connected with the school

Location
- 702 Croghan Street; Fremont, Ohio 43420–2417; United States; 41°20′49″N 83°7′8″W

Information
- Type: Private, coeducational
- Religious affiliation: Roman Catholic
- Established: 1896
- Oversight: Roman Catholic Diocese of Toledo
- NCES School ID: 01060896
- Head of School: Kim Cope
- Grades: 9–12
- Colors: Crimson and gray
- Athletics conference: Sandusky Bay Conference; Northern 8 Football Conference (Football only)
- Team name: Crimson Streaks
- Accreditation: Ohio Department of Education, Ohio Catholic School Accrediting Association
- Publication: The Voice
- Yearbook: The Josemont
- Website: www.bishop-hoffman.net/sjcc-campus-6-12

Saint Joseph Central Catholic High School is a private, Roman Catholic high school in Fremont, Ohio. They are affiliated with the Roman Catholic Diocese of Toledo. Athletic teams are known as the Crimson Streaks, and they compete as a member of the Ohio High School Athletic Association in the Sandusky Bay Conference and Northern 8 Football Conference.

== History ==
Opened in 1896, St. Joseph Central Catholic High School serves students grades 9-12.

A brick house on the northeast corner of Croghan and Wood streets was purchased, remodeled to use as a high school facility for SJCC. it was torn down in 1907 to make way for a new building. In 1908, SJCC's new building was completed at an estimated cost of $80,000 (nearly 2,000,000 in 2017).

in 1957, SJCC would have a new high school constructed on the corner of Croghan and North Clover Streets. The former building was used as St. Joseph Elementary School, with the new high school located next door.

in 2011, the three Catholic Elementary Schools in Fremont (St. Ann, St. Joseph & Sacred Heart) along with SJCC High School were consolidated into one school system named Bishop Hoffman Catholic Schools. The name was chosen to honor the late Bishop James Hoffman, a native of Fremont, who served as bishop from 1981 until his death in 2003. Under this configuration, Grades Pre-K through 3rd were located at the former Sacred Heart Elementary building, Grades 4–8 were located at the former St. Joseph Elementary building and the High School (Grades 9–12) remained the same. The former St. Ann Elementary building was closed.

In 2015, reconfiguration of Bishop Hoffman Catholic Schools resulted in the closing of the aging St. Joseph Elementary building that served students for 107 years. In the new configuration, grades Pre-K through 5th are at the Sacred Heart Campus. Grades 6–8 are at the SJCC Junior High Academy located inside the high school building. The high school students, grades 9–12, remain in the high school building.

in 2019, SJCCs, campus that stood since 1908 was demolished to make way for their new campus.

== Athletics ==
Saint Joseph Central Catholic High School currently offers:

- Football (8-man)
- Cross Country
- Golf
- Tennis
- Volleyball
- Basketball
- Band
- Cheerleading
- Bowling
- Baseball
- Softball
- Swimming
- Track and Field
- Wrestling

== Notable alumni ==
- Tom Beier - former professional football player in the National Football League (NFL)
- Mark Coleman - former Ultimate Fighting Championship (UFC) fighter
