= Diocese of Toledo, Ohio =

Latin Catholic ecclesiastical jurisdiction in Ohio

Coordinates: 41°39′55″N 83°34′30″W

Diocese of Toledo in America Dioecesis Toletana in America
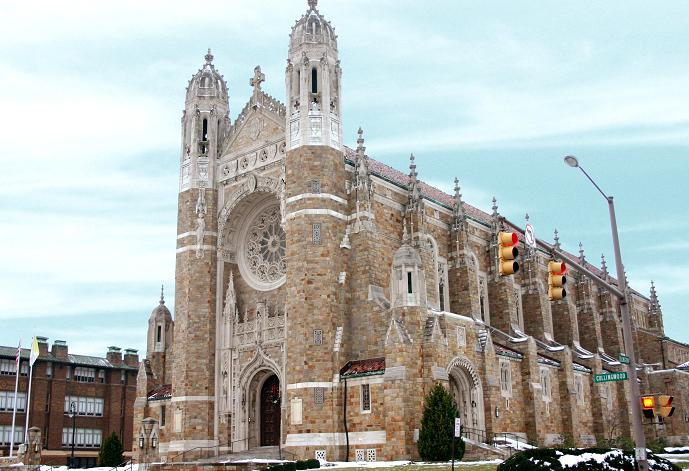
- Our Lady, Queen of the Most; Holy Rosary Cathedral

- Coat of arms

Location
- Country: United States
- Territory: The counties of Allen, Crawford, Defiance, Erie, Fulton, Hancock, Henry, Huron, Lucas, Ottawa, Paulding, Putnam, Richland, Sandusky, Seneca, Van Wert, Williams, Wood and Wyandot in northwestern Ohio.
- Ecclesiastical province: Cincinnati

Statistics
- Area: 8,222 sq mi (21,290 km^{2})
- Population: Total; Catholics: (as of 2010); 1,461,436; 321,516 (22%)
- Parishes: 121

Information
- Denomination: Catholic
- Sui iuris church: Latin Church
- Rite: Roman Rite
- Established: April 15, 1910 (116 years ago)
- Cathedral: Our Lady, Queen of the Most Holy Rosary Cathedral
- Patron saint: Our Lady of the Rosary (principal); Francis de Sales (secondary)

Current leadership
- Pope: Leo XIV
- Bishop: Daniel Edward Thomas
- Metropolitan Archbishop: Robert Gerald Casey
- Vicar General: Rev. Msgr. William Kubacki

Map
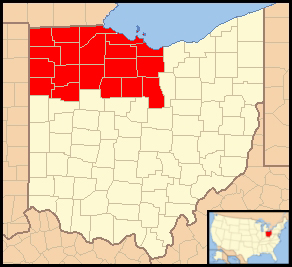

Website
- toledodiocese.org

The Diocese of Toledo (in America) (Latin: Dioecesis Toletana in America) is a diocese of the Catholic Church covering nineteen counties in northwestern Ohio in the United States. It is a suffragan see of the Archdiocese of Cincinnati. The bishop is Daniel Thomas. Our Lady, Queen of the Most Holy Rosary Cathedral is the mother church.

== History ==
=== 1700 to 1800 ===
During the 17th century, present-day Ohio was part of the French colony of New France. The Diocese of Quebec, had jurisdiction over the region. However, unlike other parts of the future American Midwest, there were no attempts to found Catholic missions in Ohio.

In 1763, Ohio Country became part of the British Province of Quebec, forbidden from settlement by American colonists. After the American Revolution ended in 1783, Pope Pius VI erected in 1784 the Prefecture Apostolic of the United States, encompassing the entire territory of the new nation. In 1787, the Ohio area became part of the Northwest Territory of the United States. Pius VI created the Diocese of Baltimore, the first diocese in the United States, to replace the prefecture apostolic in 1789.

=== 1800 to 1900 ===
In 1808, Pope Pius VII erected the Diocese of Bardstown in Kentucky, with jurisdiction over the new state of Ohio along with the other Midwestern States. Pope Pius VII on June 19, 1821, erected the Diocese of Cincinnati, taking all of Ohio from Bardstown. In 1842, the first Catholic church in Toledo, St. Francis de Sales, was constructed.

Pope Pius IX erected the Diocese of Cleveland in 1847, with territory taken from Cincinnati. Northwest Ohio would be part of the Diocese of Cleveland for the next 63 years. The Sisters of Charity of Montreal (the Grey Nuns) in 1855 opened St. Vincent Hospital in Toledo. Today it is Mercy Health – St. Vincent Medical Center. In 1883, the Sisters of Mercy founded Riverside Hospital in Toledo for unwed mothers.

In 1884, Bishop Richard Gilmour of Cleveland demanded that the Grey Nuns turn over ownership of Riverside Hospital, along with their orphanage, to the Diocese of Cleveland. Gilmour believed that since these two institutions were supported by donations from Catholics in the diocese, the diocese should own the institutions. The Grey Nuns disagreed, stating that the diocese had invited them to come to Toledo and open this hospital and orphanage. Gilmour then ordered the removal of the eucharist from the nuns' chapel in Toledo. In 1886, the Vatican asked Archbishop William Henry Elder of Cincinnati to mediate the dispute. Gilmour refused to cooperate with Elder, who finally gave up on the initiative. The Vatican later rule in favor of the Grey Nuns.

=== 1900 to 1950 ===
Pius X erected the Diocese of Toledo on April 15, 1910, in territory taken from the Diocese of Cleveland. The pope named Auxiliary Bishop Joseph Schrembs of the Diocese of Grand Rapids as the first bishop of the new diocese.

Schrembs requested that the Sisters of Saint Francis of Rochester, Minnesota, send nuns to Toledo to work with Polish immigrant children. Sister Adelaide Sandusky, director of the College of St. Teresa, and 22 other sisters began teaching in Toledo schools. This community became the Sisters of St. Francis of Sylvania From 1911 to 1921, Schrembs established 13 new parishes and 33 schools. At Schrembs' invitation, a contingent of the Sisters of the Visitation came to Toledo in 1915 from their Georgetown monastery in Washington, D.C.

The Sisters of Mercy opened their Mercy School of Nursing in Toledo in 1918, just as the arrival of the Spanish Flu in Toledo created a huge need for nurses. Today it is Mercy College of Ohio.

In 1921, Pope Pius XI appointed Schrembs as bishop of Cleveland. His replacement in Toledo was Samuel Stritch, named by Pius XI in 1921. The Ursuline Order in 1922 established Mary Manse College in Toledo, a women's college. Schrembs incorporated the diocesan Catholic Charities in 1923. He also began construction of Holy Rosary Cathedral, whose cornerstone was laid by Cardinal János Csernoch in 1926. In 1930, Pius XI named Stritch as archbishop of the Archdiocese of Milwaukee. To replace Stritch, the pope in 1931 named Karl Alter, the first priest from Toledo to become its bishop.

During his tenure as bishop, Alter oversaw construction of Holy Rosary Cathedral and an addition to Central Catholic High School in Toledo. He established DeSales College in Toledo in 1942. That same year, he arranged for a 12-acre (49,000 m2) parcel of diocesan land in East Toledo to be donated for the construction of St. Charles Hospital. In 1950, after 20 years as bishop of Toledo, Alter was named archbishop of Cincinnati. St. Charles Hospital opened in 1953. It is today Mercy Health - St. Charles Hospital.

=== 1950 to 2000 ===
Alter was replaced in Toledo by Auxiliary Bishop George Rehring of Cincinnati by Pius XII in 1950. Rehring in 1957 consolidated all the diocesan offices in one location in Toledo. He retired as bishop of Toledo in 1967. Pope Paul VI then named Auxiliary Bishop John Donovan from the Archdiocese of Detroit as the new bishop of Toledo.

Donovan implemented the reforms of the Second Vatican Council of the early 1960s in the diocese. He joined the Ohio Council of Churches, established a permanent diaconate and opened a chancery office for divorced, separated, and widowed Catholics. In 1967, Donovan issued a pastoral letter endorsing an open housing ballot initiative, which was defeated in a city referendum that fall. Donovan also established the Diocesan Development Fund and special programs for Spanish-speaking, African American and elderly Catholics. During his tenure, Donovan also erected Resurrection Parish in Lexington in 1969 and St. Joan of Arc Parish in Toledo in 1978. The Catholic population in the diocese increased from 301,000 to 348,000. Donovan retired in 1980.

The next bishop of Toledo was Auxiliary Bishop James Hoffman, appointed by Pope John Paul II in 1980. In 1988, Robert J. Fisher, then associate pastor at St. Rose Church in Perrysburg, pleaded guilty to sexual imposition and contributing to the sexual abuse of a minor. He was sentenced to 30 days in jail and four years of counseling. In 1992, Bishop Hoffman returned Fisher to active ministry.

=== 2000 to 2010 ===
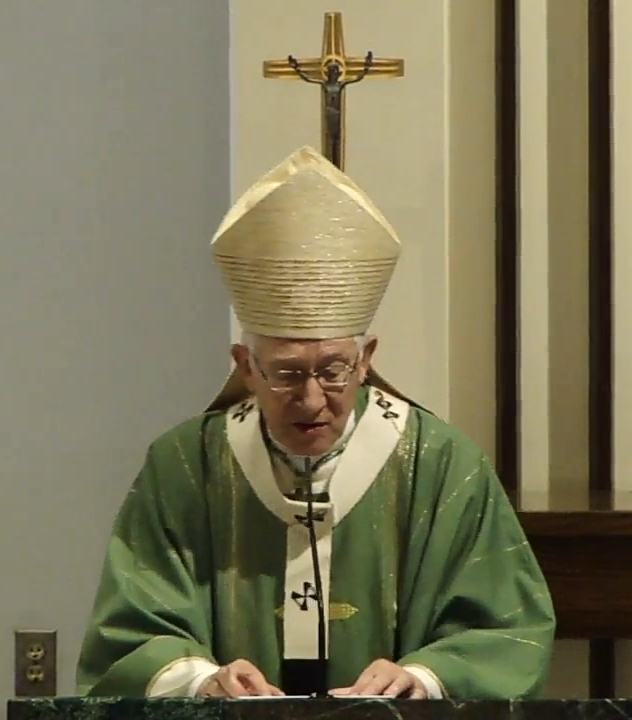
Archbishop Blaire (2021)

Following a new policy from the U.S. Conference of Catholic Bishops on priests convicted of sexual abuse, Hoffman permanently suspended Fisher and three other priests from ministry in 2002. Hoffman blamed "the media climate" for the new policy and said he had no plans to remove other such priests. He later declared, "My difficulty with zero tolerance is that the Gospel teaches reconciliation. We believe in forgiveness." Hoffman died in 2003 and was replaced by Auxiliary Bishop Leonard Blair of Detroit, named by John Paul II. In 2005, Blair directed the Sisters of St. Francis to cancel a three-workshop by New Ways Ministry at the order's campus in Tiffin. The group was "not at all in accord with the guidelines for pastoral care which the bishops of the United States issued in 2006 regarding 'Ministry to Persons with a Homosexual Inclination," wrote the bishop. The diocese announced in 2004 that it had settled 23 lawsuits by victims of sexual abuse by diocesan priests; the diocese would pay $1.19 million.

Gerald Robinson, a diocesan priest, was convicted in 2006 of the 1980 murder of Sister Margaret Ann Pahl at Mercy Health – St. Vincent Hospital in Toledo. Robinson had strangled Pahl and stabbed her 31 times. Prosecutors in 1980 did not charge Robinson with any crimes, citing insufficient evidence. Prosecutors reopened the Pahl case in 2003 after investigators reexamined the case file. Robinson was tried, convicted and sentenced to 15 years to life in prison, where he died in 2014.

=== 2010 to present ===
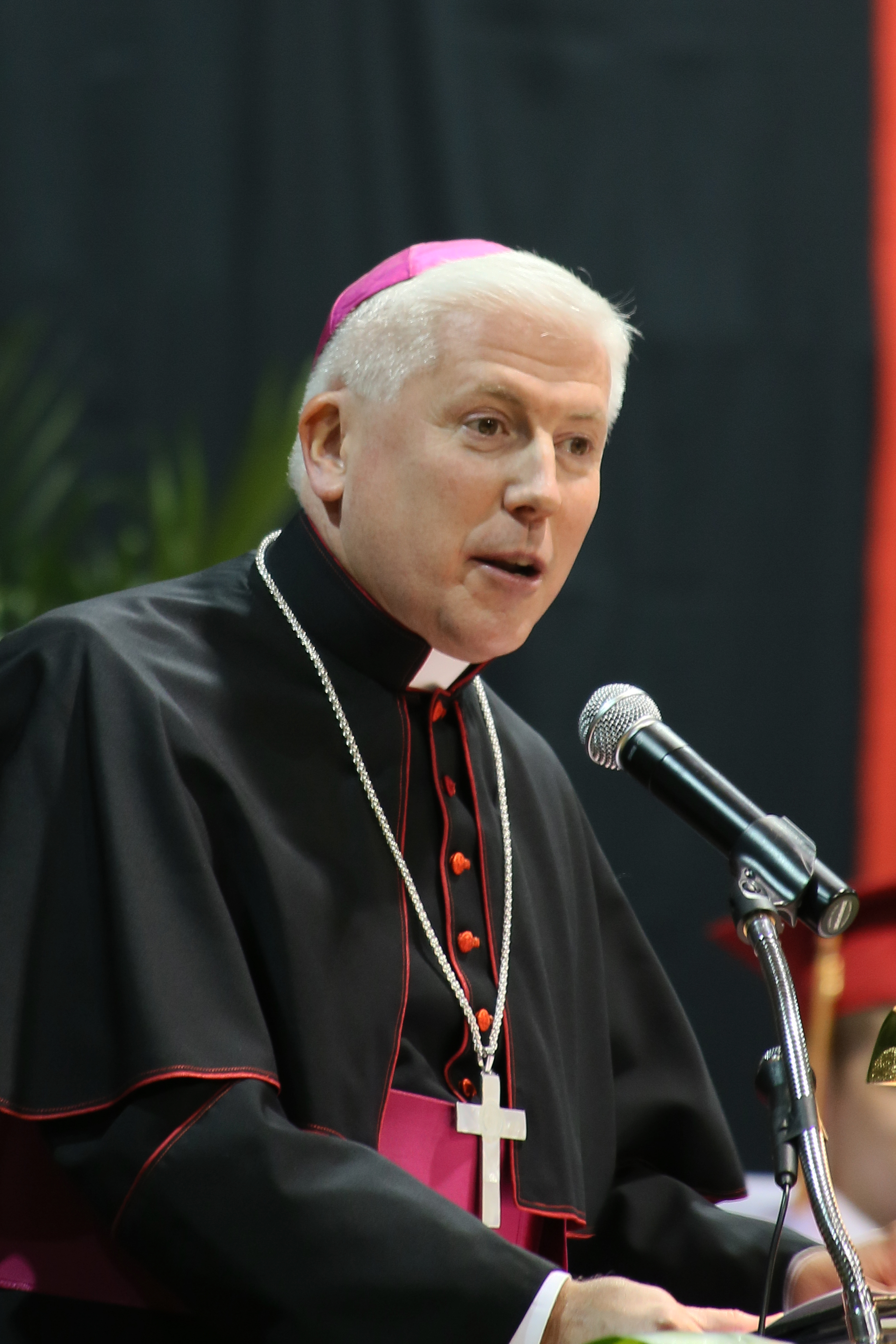
Bishop Thomas (2013)

In July 2011, Blair told parishes and parochial schools in the diocese not to raise funds for the Susan G. Komen Foundation. He cited concerns that the foundation could use the money to fund embryonic stem-cell research. Pope Francis appointed Blair as archbishop of the Archdiocese of Hartford in 2013. Francis in 2014 appointed Auxiliary Bishop Daniel Thomas from the Archdiocese of Philadelphia as the new bishop in Toledo.

The diocese in 2016 ceased publication of its newspaper, the Catholic Chronicle, and ended the televising of weekly masses as part of an effort to reduce its financial deficit. Michael Zacharias, a diocesan prist, was convicted in May 2023 of five counts of sex trafficking. He was sentenced to life in prison in November 2023. He was laicized in 2024. That same year, the diocese announced a $1million settlement for three of Zacharias' victims.

By 2023, the diocese had a weekly attendance of 52,840 people at its 123 parishes. The diocese in May 2026 held the groundbreaking for its new pastoral center in Toledo.

== Bishops ==
=== Bishops of Toledo ===
1. Joseph Schrembs (1911–1921), appointed Bishop of Cleveland and archbishop (personal title) in 1939
2. Samuel Alphonsius Stritch (1921–1930), appointed Archbishop of Milwaukee and later Archbishop of Chicago and Pro-Prefect of the Sacred Congregation for the Propagation of the Faith (elevated to cardinal in 1946)
3. Karl Joseph Alter (1931–1950), appointed Archbishop of Cincinnati
4. George John Rehring (1950–1967)
5. John Anthony Donovan (1967–1980)
6. James Robert Hoffman (1980–2003)
7. Leonard Paul Blair (2003–2013), appointed Archbishop of Hartford
8. Daniel Edward Thomas (2014–present)

=== Auxiliary bishops ===
1. Albert Henry Ottenweller (1974–1977), appointed Bishop of Steubenville
2. James Robert Hoffman (1978–1980)
3. Robert William Donnelly (1984–2006)

=== Other priests born or who ministered in the diocese who became bishops ===
- Augustus John Schwertner, appointed Bishop of Wichita in 1921
- John Stowe, OFM Conv., Bishop of Lexington in 2015
- Earl K. Fernandes, Bishop of Columbus in 2022
- Dennis G. Walsh, Bishop of Davenport in 2024
- Bruce Lewandowski, CSsR, Bishop of Providence in 2025 (previously Auxiliary Bishop of Baltimore since 2020)
- Gary Studniewski, appointed auxiliary bishop of the Archdiocese of Washington in 2026

== Coat of arms ==
In the coat of arms for the Diocese of Toledo, the field is half-blue (dexter) and half-red (sinister). A silver tower with a red cross appears on the field. This coat of arms is based on the coat of arms for the City of Toledo in Spain.

Heraldist Pierre de Chaignon la Rose designed the diocesan arms in 1912. The formal heraldic blazon is Per pale azure and gules, a tower triply-turreted, the central turret the tallest, argent, charged with a cross-humetty of the second.

== General information ==
The Diocese of Toledo covers 8,222 square miles (21,290 km^{2}) in the following counties:Williams, Defiance, Paulding, Van Wert, Fulton, Henry, Putnam, Allen, Lucas, Wood, Hancock, Ottawa, Sandusky, Seneca, Wyandot, Crawford, Erie, Huron, and Richland.

=== Parishes ===
The Diocese of Toledo as of 2026 had 121 parishes.

=== Personnel ===
In 2018, the diocese had the following personnel:

- 203 active priests
- 44 priests were from religious orders (32 active and 12 retired/senior status)
- 63 priests were retired/senior status.
- Nine religious brothers, 410 religious women (sisters), 187 permanent deacons and 17 diocesan seminarians.

== Education ==
As of 2026, the Diocese of Toledo had 53 elementary schools and 13 high schools serving over 15,000 students.

=== High schools ===
- Calvert Catholic High School – Tiffin
- Cardinal Stritch High School – Oregon
- Central Catholic High School – Toledo
- Lima Central Catholic High School – Lima
- Notre Dame Academy – Toledo
- Sandusky Central Catholic High School – Sandusky
- SJCC campus, Bishop Hoffman School – Fremont
- St. Francis de Sales School – Toledo
- St. John the Evangelist Catholic School – Delphos
- St. John's Jesuit High School – Toledo
- St. Paul High School – Norwalk
- St. Peter's School – Mansfield
- St. Ursula Academy – Toledo

== Catholic radio within the diocese ==
Catholic Radio began broadcasting in the Diocese of Toledo in 2010, beginning with WJTA followed by WNOC. Several local stations owned by separate entities. These include:

WNOC 89.7 FM is licensed to Bowling Green and is based in Toledo as "Annunciation Radio". It has four sister stations:

- WHRQ 88.1 FM in Sandusky
- WFOT 89.5 FM in Lexington
- WSHB 90.9 FM in Willard
- WRRO 89.9 FM in Edon and based in Bryan.

Other stations in the diocese include:

- WJTA 88.9 FM licensed to Glandorf and based in Leipsic serving Putnam and surrounding counties as "Holy Family Radio" which also serves the Findlay and northern portions of the Lima areas.
- WOHA 94.9 FM in Ada, serving the greater Lima area as a simulcast of WJTA.
- WSJG-LP 103.3 FM in Tiffin as "St. John Paul The Great Radio."
