= James Robert Hoffman =

His Excellency, The Most Reverend James Robert Hoffman
- Bishop of Toledo
- Bishop Hoffman in 1981
- Church: Catholic Church
- In office: February 17, 1981 – February 8, 2003
- Predecessor: John Anthony Donovan
- Successor: Leonard Paul Blair
- Previous post: Auxiliary Bishop of Toledo (1978–1980)

Orders
- Ordination: July 28, 1957 by George John Rehring
- Consecration: June 23, 1978 by John Anthony Donovan

Personal details
- Born: June 12, 1932 Fremont, Ohio, US
- Died: February 8, 2003 (aged 70) Toledo, Ohio, US
- Education: St. Meinrad Seminary; St. Mary Seminary; Catholic University of America
- Motto: Omnia omnibus (All things to all men)

Ordination history of James Robert Hoffman
History
Episcopal consecration
- Consecrated by: John Anthony Donovan
Episcopal succession
Bishops consecrated by James Robert Hoffman as principal consecrator
- Robert William Donnelly: May 3, 1984

James Robert Hoffman (June 12, 1932 – February 8, 2003) was an American prelate of the Roman Catholic Church. He served as bishop of Toledo in Ohio from 1981 until his death in 2003. He previously served as an auxiliary bishop of the same diocese from 1978 to 1980.

== Early life ==
James Hoffman was born on June 12, 1932, in Fremont, Ohio. He studied at St. Meinrad Seminary in St. Meinrad, Indiana and St. Mary Seminary in Norwood, Ohio.

Hoffman was ordained to the priesthood at St. Ann's Church in Fremont by Bishop George Rehring for the Diocese of Toledo on July 28, 1957. He then served as a curate at the following Ohio parishes:

- St. Peter's in Mansfield
- St. Joseph's in Marblehead
- Blessed Sacrament in Toledo

In 1966, Hoffman earned a Licentiate of Canon Law from the Catholic University of America in Washington, D.C. Hoffman was later named secretary to Bishop John Donovan and chancellor of the diocese. In addition to these duties, he also served as pastor of St. Joseph's Parish in Sylvania, Ohio.

== Auxiliary Bishop and Bishop of Toledo ==
On April 18, 1978, Hoffman was appointed as an auxiliary bishop of the Diocese of Toledo and Titular Bishop of Italica by Pope Paul VI. He received his episcopal consecration at Our Lady, Queen of the Most Holy Rosary Cathedral in Toledo on June 23, 1978, from Bishop Donovan, with Archbishop Joseph Bernardin and Bishop Albert Ottenweller serving as co-consecrators. Hoffman selected as his episcopal motto: "Omnia Omnibus", meaning, "All things to all men" (1 Corinthians 9:22).

Hoffman was named by Pope John Paul II as the sixth bishop of Toledo on December 16, 1980. He was installed by Archbishop Bernardin at Rosary Cathedral in Toledo on February 17, 1981.

Hoffman was criticized for his handling of sexual abuse cases in the diocese, which had 11 lawsuits filed against it. In 1992, he placed Reverend Robert J. Fisher in active ministry after the latter had admitted to molesting a 14-year-old girl and spent 30 days in prison. He suspended Fisher in 2002 due to "the media climate," but said he had no plans to remove other such priests. He later declared, "My difficulty with zero tolerance is that the Gospel teaches reconciliation. We believe in forgiveness."

== Death ==
James Hoffman died from cancer at the Ursuline Center in Toledo on February 8, 2003, at age 70. He is buried at St. Ann Cemetery in Fremont.

Catholic Church titles
Preceded by John Anthony Donovan	Bishop of Toledo; 1981–2003	Succeeded by Leonard Paul Blair
