= Gerald Robinson =

Gerald Robinson may refer to:

- Gerald Robinson (American football) (born 1963), American football player
- Gerald Robinson (basketball, born 1984), American professional basketball player, played college basketball at Tennessee–Aiken
- Gerald Robinson (basketball, born 1989), American professional basketball player, played college basketball at Georgia
- Gerald Robinson (born 1938), retired Roman Catholic priest who was convicted of the murder of Margaret Ann Pahl

== See also ==
- Gerard Robinson, school choice advocate in the United States
