= Samuel Stritch =

American Catholic cardinal (1887–1958)

His Eminence Samuel Stritch
- Pro-Prefect of the Sacred Congregation for Propagation of the Faith
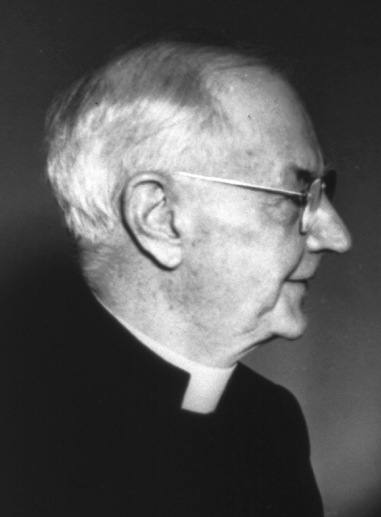
- See: Chicago
- Appointed: December 27, 1939
- Installed: January 3, 1940
- Term ended: May 27, 1958
- Predecessor: George Mundelein
- Successor: Albert Gregory Meyer
- Other post: Cardinal-Priest of Sant'Agnese fuori le mura
- Previous posts: Archbishop of Chicago (1940–1958); Archbishop of Milwaukee (1930–1939); Bishop of Toledo (1921–1930)

Orders
- Ordination: May 21, 1910 by Pietro Respighi
- Consecration: November 30, 1921 by Henry K. Moeller
- Created cardinal: February 18, 1946 by Pius XII
- Rank: Cardinal-Priest

Personal details
- Born: August 17, 1887 Nashville, Tennessee, US
- Died: May 27, 1958 (aged 70) Rome, Italy
- Motto: Deus meus adjutor meus (Latin for 'God is my helper')
- Styles
- Reference style: His Eminence
- Spoken style: Your Eminence
- Informal style: Cardinal
- See: Chicago (emeritus)

Samuel Alphonsus Stritch (August 17, 1887 – May 27, 1958) was an American Catholic prelate who served as archbishop of Chicago from 1940 to 1958 and as pro-prefect of the Congregation for Propagation of the Faith from March 1958 until his death two months later. He was elevated to the cardinalate by Pope Pius XII in 1946.

Stritch previously served as archbishop of Milwaukee from 1930 to 1939 and as bishop of Toledo from 1921 to 1930.

== Early life and education ==
Stritch was born on August 17, 1887, in Nashville, Tennessee, to Garret (Gerard) (1839–1896) and Katherine (née O'Malley) Stritch. The O'Malley family immigrated to the United States from Ireland when Katherine was a young child. They settled in Louisville, Kentucky, where the family opened a boarding house. Garret was born in Ballyheigue, Kerry, in Ireland, but immigrated to Louisville from Dublin in 1879.

Once in Louisville, Garret boarded with the O'Malley family; he married Katherine in 1880. The Stritch family later moved to Nashville, where Garret worked as the manager of the Sycamore Mill near Ashland City. The second youngest of eight children, Samuel had two brothers and five sisters. They all attended the Church of the Assumption in Nashville.

Considered a child prodigy, Samuel Stritch finished primary school at age ten and high school at age 14 in Nashville. Deciding to become a priest, Stritch in 1901 entered St. Gregory's Preparatory Seminary in Cincinnati, Ohio, where he obtained a Bachelor of Arts degree in 1903.

Bishop Thomas Byrne of Nashville then sent Stritch to study at the Pontifical Urbaniana Athenaeum De Propaganda Fide in Rome, during which time he resided at the Pontifical North American College. He later earned his doctorates in philosophy and in theology. While in Rome, Stritch befriended Monsignor Eugenio Pacelli, who later became Pope Pius XII.

== Priesthood ==
Stritch was ordained to the priesthood for the Diocese of Nashville by Cardinal Pietro Respighi on May 21, 1910, at the Basilica of St. John Lateran in Rome. At age 22, Stritch was below the age requirement for ordination, but Pope Pius X granted him a dispensation. He remarked that, "[Stritch] is young in years but old in intelligence. Let him be ordained."

After Stritch returned to the United States, the diocese assigned him in 1911 as pastor of St. Patrick's Church in Memphis. Byrne named him as his private secretary in 1913 and as a diocesan chancellor in 1917. The Vatican appointed Stritch as a domestic prelate in May 1921.

== Episcopal career ==
=== Bishop of Toledo ===
On August 10, 1921, Stritch was appointed the second bishop of Toledo by Pope Benedict XV. He received his episcopal consecration at the Cathedral of Saint Francis de Sales in Toledo on November 30, 1921, from Archbishop Henry K. Moeller, with Bishops John Morris and Thomas Molloy serving as co-consecrators.

During his tenure in Toledo, Stritch established Mary Manse College, a women's college in Toledo in 1922. He incorporated the diocesan branch of Catholic Charities in 1923. Stritch laid the cornerstone in 1926 of the new Holy Rosary Cathedral in Toledo.

While in Toledo, Stritch presided at the confirmation of the future comedian Danny Thomas, and he would mentor Thomas throughout his life. A Tennessee native, Stritch urged Thomas to locate St. Jude Children's Research Hospital, the entertainer's main charity, in Memphis, Tennessee.

=== Archbishop of Milwaukee ===
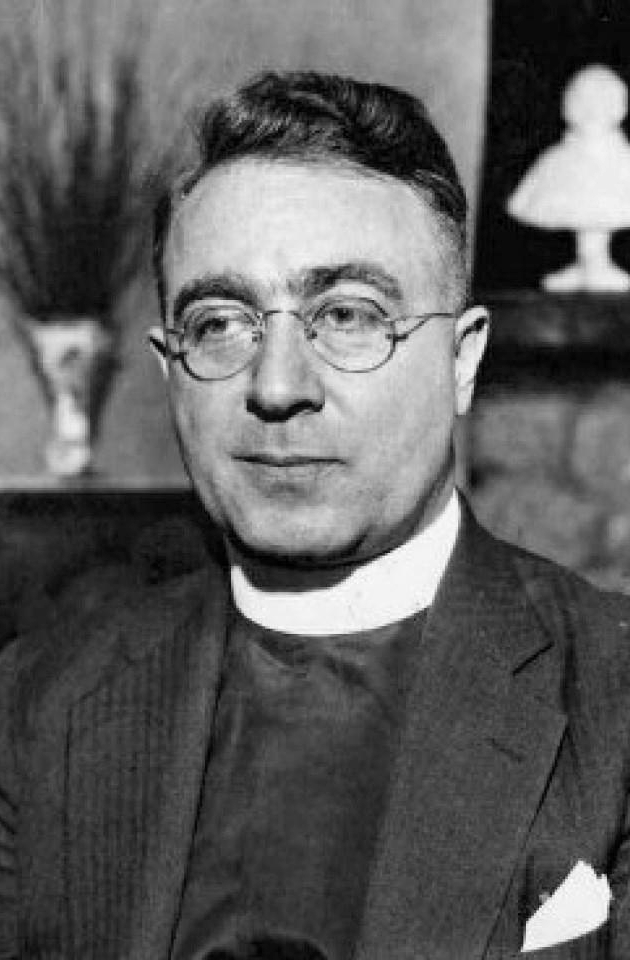
Reverend Charles Coughlin (1938)

Following the death of Archbishop Sebastian Messmer, Stritch was named the fifth archbishop of Milwaukee on August 26, 1930, by Pope Pius IX. Stritch suffered from periods of depression early in his tenure as archbishop, but joined nationwide feelings of optimism with the 1932 election of US President Franklin D. Roosevelt.

Stritch provided extensive support to the victims of the Great Depression. Due to the economic downturn, he refused to spend money restoring the Cathedral of St. John the Evangelist, which was heavily damaged by fire in 1935, or St. Francis de Sales Seminary. Stritch once remarked "As long as two pennies are ours, one of them belongs to the poor.""

Stritch was an advocate for Catholic Action an international movement of lay people, and the Catholic Youth Organization. In November 1939, he was elected chairman of the National Catholic Welfare Conference, the predecessor of the United States Conference of Catholic Bishops. He also served as vice-chancellor of the Extension Society.

Stritch was an opponent of Reverend Charles Coughlin, a popular anti-Semitic radio broadcaster. Stritch in December 1939 wrote a letter to a Milwaukee rabbi that rebuked those who,

"...gain and hold a popular audience, degrade themselves and abuse the trust reposed in them by misquoting, half-quoting, and actually insinuating half-truths."

=== Archbishop of Chicago ===
Despite Stritch's protests, Pope Pius XII appointed him the fourth archbishop of Chicago, Illinois, on December 27, 1939. Succeeding the late Cardinal George Mundelein, Stritch was formally installed on January 3, 1940. Stritch was the personal choice of Apostolic Delegate Amleto Giovanni Cicognani for the post, although Roosevelt reputedly wanted Bishop Bernard Sheil instead.

In 1943, during World War II, Stritch signed a peace program developed by American Protestant, Catholic, Eastern Orthodox, and Jewish leaders. Pius XII created him as cardinal-priest of the Basilica of Sant'Agnese fuori le mura in Rome during the consistory of February 18, 1946. As archbishop of Chicago, Stritch oversaw the establishment of the first American chapter of the organization Opus Dei, the launching of the Christian Family Movement, and an outreach program to the Puerto Rican community.

In 1952, Stritch delivered the invocation at the opening session of the 1952 Democratic National Convention in Chicago, saying "Today we face a crisis as grave as that of Valley Forge." Referring to communists and secularists, Stritch asked for divine protection against;

"the aggression of those within and without of Godless enslaving political systems and of those who wittingly or unwittingly seek to take away our freedoms by their advocacy of materialism and Godless humanism."

In 1954, Stritch issued a pastoral letter exhorting Catholics in his archdiocese to not attend the assembly of the World Council of Churches at Evanston, Illinois, writing,

"The Catholic Church does not...enter into any organization in which the delegates of many sects sit down in council or conference as equals...She does not allow her children to engage in any activity...based on the false assumption that Roman Catholics, too, are still searching for the truth of Christ,"

Stritch's pastoral letter against ecumenism dismayed several Protestant and ecumenical figures.

=== Pro-Prefect of the Congregation for the Propagation of Faith ===
On March 1, 1958, Pius XII appointed Stritch as pro-prefect of the Sacred Congregation for the Propagation of Faith in Rome.

=== Death ===
In May 1958, while in Rome, Stritch suffered a blood clot on his right arm. Surgeons at the Sanatrix Clinic in the city were forced to amputate the arm above the elbow. On May 19, Stritch suffered a stroke. He died eight days later at age 70.

After lying in state at the Pontifical North American College in Rome and then at the Cathedral of the Holy Name in Chicago, Stritch's remains were interred in the Bishops' Mausoleum at Mount Carmel Cemetery in Hillside, Illinois, on June 3.

== Legacy ==
- Cardinal Stritch University in Milwaukee, closed in 2023
- Cardinal Stritch High School in Oregon, Ohio, closing in 2026.
- Cardinal Stritch High School in Keokuk, Iowa, closed in 2005
- Stritch School of Medicine at Loyola University Chicago.

== See also ==
- Catholic Church hierarchy
- Catholic Church in the United States
- Historical list of the Catholic bishops of the United States
- List of Catholic bishops of the United States
- Lists of patriarchs, archbishops, and bishops

Catholic Church titles
| Preceded by Pietro Fumasoni Biondi as Prefect | Pro-Prefect of the Congregation for the Propagation of the Faith; 1958 | Succeeded by Grégoire-Pierre Agagianian as Prefect |
| Preceded by Adolf Bertram | Cardinal Priest of Sant'Agnese fuori le mura 1946–1958 | Succeeded by Carlo Confalonieri |
| Preceded by George Mundelein | Archbishop of Chicago; 1940–1958 | Succeeded by Albert Gregory Meyer |
| Preceded by Sebastian Gebhard Messmer | Archbishop of Milwaukee; 1930–1940 | Succeeded by Moses E. Kiley |
| Preceded by Joseph Schrembs | Bishop of Toledo; 1921–1930 | Succeeded by Karl Joseph Alter |
