= Tom Beier =

American football player (born 1945)

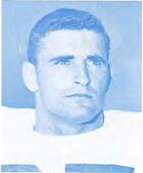
- Beier in 1966

No. 47
- Position: Safety

Personal information
- Born: June 23, 1945 (age 81); Fremont, Ohio, U.S.
- Listed height: 5 ft 11 in (1.80 m)
- Listed weight: 195 lb (88 kg)

Career information
- High school: St. Joseph's (Fremont)
- College: Detroit Mercy; Miami (FL)
- NFL draft: 1967: 10th round, 241st overall pick

Career history
- Miami Dolphins (1967, 1969)

Awards and highlights
- Consensus All-American (1966)

Career AFL statistics
- Interceptions: 2
- Fumble recoveries: 2
- Stats at Pro Football Reference

Thomas Eugene Beier (born June 23, 1945) is an American former professional football player who was a safety for the Miami Dolphins of the American Football League (AFL).

Beier is a graduate of Saint Joseph Central Catholic High School in Fremont, Ohio. He played college football for the Miami Hurricanes, earning consensus All-American honors in 1966.

== See also ==
- Other American Football League players
