= Karl Joseph Alter =

American prelate

His Excellency, The Most Reverend Karl Joseph Alter
- Archbishop of Cincinnati titular archbishop of Minora.
- See: Archdiocese of Cincinnati
- Installed: June 14, 1950
- Term ended: July 19, 1969
- Predecessor: John T. McNicholas
- Successor: Paul Francis Leibold
- Other post: Bishop of Toledo (1931 – 1950)

Orders
- Ordination: June 4, 1910 by John Patrick Farrelly
- Consecration: June 17, 1931 by John T. McNicholas

Personal details
- Born: August 18, 1885 Toledo, Ohio, USA
- Died: August 23, 1977 (aged 92) Cincinnati, Ohio, USA
- Denomination: Roman Catholic Church
- Coat of arms

Karl Joseph Alter (August 18, 1885 – August 23, 1977) was an American prelate of the Roman Catholic Church. He served as bishop of the Diocese of Toledo in Ohio (1931–1950) and as archbishop of the Archdiocese of Cincinnati in Ohio (1950–1969).

== Biography ==
=== Early life ===
Karl Alter was born on August 18, 1885, in Toledo, Ohio, to John P. and Elizabeth (née Kuttner) Alter. His father was a cigar manufacturer and liquor dealer. Karl Alter attended St. John High School, and was a member of the first graduating class of St. John's College in Toledo in 1905. He made his theological studies at St. Mary's Seminary in Cleveland, Ohio.

=== Priesthood ===
On June 4, 1910, Alter was ordained to the priesthood by Bishop John Farrelly for the Diocese of Toledo. He then served as administrator of St. Mary's Parish in Leipsic, Ohio, until 1912, when he became a curate at St. John's Parish in Lima, Ohio. In 1914, Alter was appointed the first diocesan director of Catholic Charities, coordinating various charitable organizations in the diocese into one agency. During this period, Alter also served as vice-president of the Toledo Social Service Foundation, a trustee of the Toledo Red Cross and of the Toledo Society for the Blind, and a member of the children's division of the state department of public welfare.

Alter served as a lecturer in sociology at St. John's College and at Mary Manse College in Toledo from 1914 to 1930. He earned a Master's degree from St. John's in 1923 and a doctorate in 1929. In 1929, Alter was named director of the School of Social Service at the Catholic University of America in Washington, D.C. While in Washington, he also served as chairman of the speakers' committee for the Catholic Hour radio program.

=== Bishop of Toledo ===
On April 17, 1931, Alter was appointed the third bishop of the Diocese of Toledo by Pope Pius XI. He received his episcopal consecration on June 17, 1931, from Archbishop John T. McNicholas, with Bishops Augustus Schwertner and Joseph H. Albers serving as co-consecrators. He was the first priest from the Diocese of Toledo to become its bishop. He founded the Catholic Chronicle in 1934.

In 1938, Alter condemned religious persecution in Germany and unrest in Palestine. Along with fellow American bishops, Alter publicly criticized the Moscow Agreement of 1943, fearful that the Soviet Union would not fulfill its promises on religious and personal freedoms. In 1944, he drafted a proposal for a joint declaration on world peace by Catholic, Jewish, and Protestant leaders.

Following World War II, Alter offered a 10-point program for economic security; among his points were such contemporary ideas as wage equalization on the basis of cost of living, representation of laborers on a firm's board of trustees, profit-sharing, and special consideration for persons living on fixed incomes. During Alter's tenure as bishop, the construction of Rosary Cathedral in Toledo was completed and an addition to Central Catholic High School in Toledo was built. He established DeSales College in Toledo in 1942 and donated a 12-acre (49,000 m^{2}) parcel of land in East Toledo for the construction of St. Charles Hospital.

=== Archbishop of Cincinnati ===
Following the death of Archbishop McNicholas, Alter was appointed by Pope Pius XII as the fifth archbishop of the Archdiocese of Cincinnati on June 14, 1950. During his administration, he established 98 churches, 94 elementary schools, 14 high schools, 79 rectories, and 55 convents. He also instituted a priests' senate and an archdiocesan school board composed of lay members, and encouraged the formation of parish councils. He undertook a restoration of Saint Peter in Chains Cathedral.

Within the National Catholic Welfare Conference (NCWC), Alter served two terms as vice- chairman (1950–52, 1956–58), two terms as chairman (1952–1955, 1958–1962), and one term as secretary (1962–1966). As chairman of the NCWC, he issued a protest against religious and racial discrimination in June 1960. Between 1962 and 1965, Alter attended all four sessions of the Second Vatican Council in Rome, having previously served on the Central Preparatory Commission. At the council, he sat on the Commissions for Bishops and for the Government of Dioceses. He discontinued first grades in Cincinnati parochial schools in 1964 because of high costs and overcrowded classrooms. However, Alter did not believe that this would greatly interfere with children's religious education.

=== Retirement and legacy ===
Pope Paul VI accepted Alter's resignation as archbishop of Cincinnati on July 19, 1969, and appointed him as titular archbishop of Minora. Alter held that post until December 31, 1970.

Karl Alter died on August 23, 1977, in Cincinnati at age 92. Archbishop Alter High School in Kettering, Ohio, is named in his honor, as was the former Alter Elementary School in Rossford, Ohio.

Catholic Church titles
Preceded by Samuel Alphonsius Stritch	Bishop of Toledo; 1931–1950	Succeeded by George John Rehring
Preceded by John Timothy McNicholas	Archbishop of Cincinnati; 1950–1969	Succeeded by Paul Francis Leibold
