= Emmanuel Thienpont =

Catholic priest (1803–1873)

Émanuel or Emmanuel Thienpont (1803 – October 19, 1873) was a Belgian-born American Catholic priest who was a pioneer of parish organization in the Archdiocese of Cincinnati, building the first Catholic churches in Dayton, Portsmouth and Steubenville.

== Life ==
Thienpont was ordained to the priesthood in Cincinnati on January 20, 1833. He was sent to the Catholic missions on the Miami and Erie Canal, becoming pastor of St Mary's Catholic Church in Tiffin, Ohio, in 1835, and to the German Catholics in Dayton in 1837. In the latter year he established Emmanuel Church, the first Catholic church in Dayton. He died in Logan, Ohio, on October 19, 1873.
