= George John Rehring =

American prelate

His Excellency, The Most Reverend George John Rehring
- Bishop of Toledo; Titular Bishop of Tunnuna
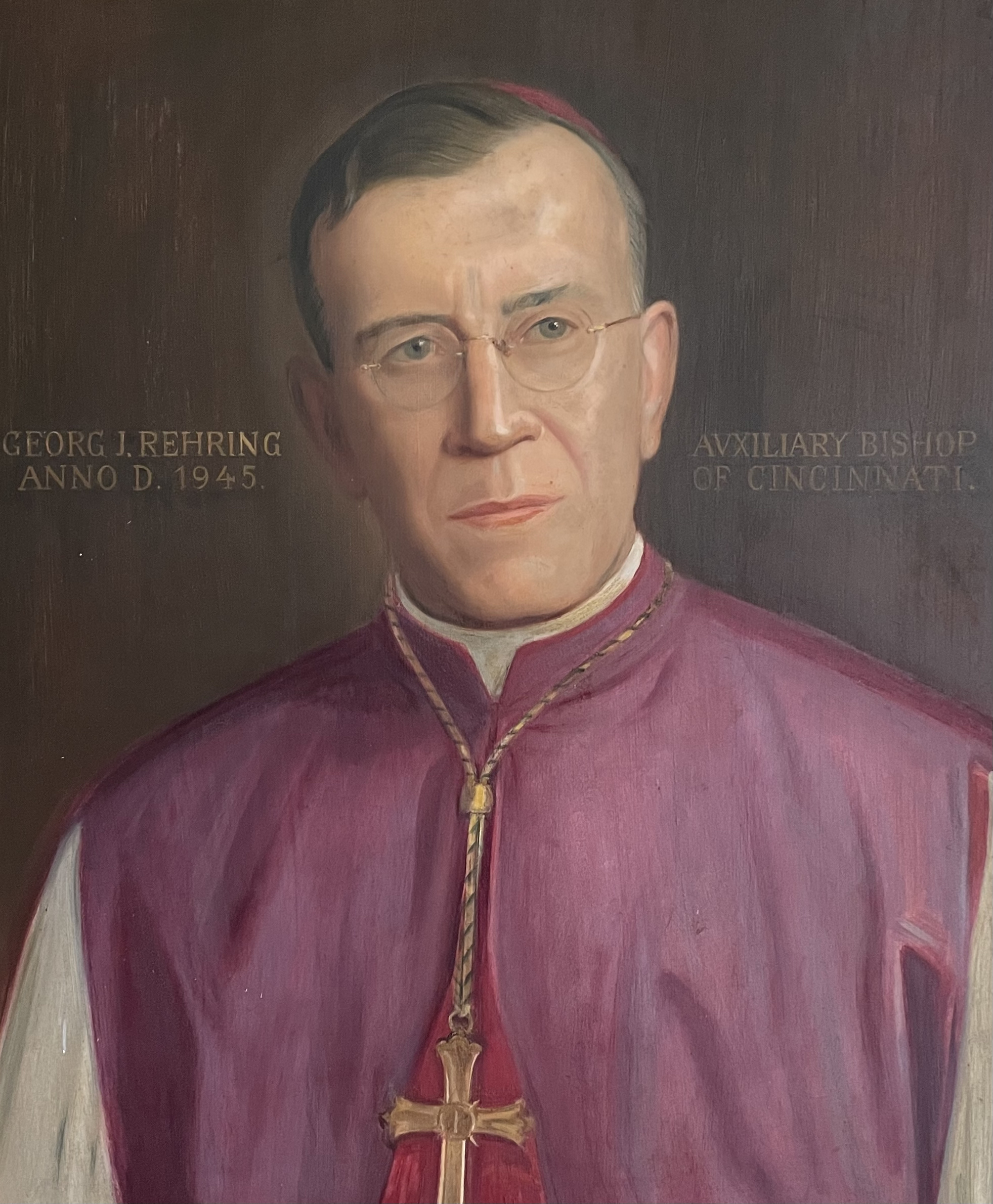
- Bishop George Rehring in portrait at Mount St. Mary's Seminary, Cincinnati, Ohio
- Church: Roman Catholic Church
- See: Diocese of Toledo
- Predecessor: Karl Joseph Alter
- Successor: John Anthony Donovan
- Other posts: Auxiliary Bishop of Cincinnati; 1937 to 1950; Titular Bishop of Tunnuna

Orders
- Ordination: March 28, 1914 by Henry K. Moeller
- Consecration: October 7, 1937 by John T. McNicholas

Personal details
- Born: June 10, 1890 Cincinnati, Ohio, US
- Died: February 29, 1976 (aged 85) Toledo, Ohio, US
- Education: St. Gregory's Preparatory Seminary; Mount St. Mary's Seminary; Pontifical University of Saint Thomas Aquinas
- Motto: In divino beneplacito (In divine good pleasure)

Styles of George Rehring
- Reference style: The Most Reverend
- Spoken style: Your Excellency
- Religious style: Monsignor
- Posthumous style: none

George John Rehring (June 10, 1890 – February 29, 1976) was an American prelate of the Roman Catholic Church. He served as bishop of the Diocese of Toledo in Ohio from 1950 to 1967. He previously served as an auxiliary bishop of the Archdiocese of Cincinnati in Ohio from 1937 to 1950.

== Biography ==
=== Early life and education ===
Rehring was born on June 10, 1890, in Cincinnati, Ohio, to Bernard L. and Mary A. (née Sander) Rehring. He attended St. Gregory's Preparatory Seminary and Mount St. Mary's Seminary, both in Cincinnati.

=== Priesthood ===
Rehring was ordained to the priesthood by Archbishop Henry K. Moeller for the Archdiocese of Cincinnati on March 28, 1914. He served as a curate at St. Mary's Parish in Hillsboro, Ohio, before being assigned to SS. Peter and Paul Parish in Reading, Ohio. In 1921, he received his first pastorate at Guardian Angels Parish in Cincinnati.

Rehring became professor of theology at Mount St. Mary's Seminary in 1923. From 1926 to 1928, he continued his studies at the Pontifical University of St. Thomas Aquinas, Angelicum in Rome, where he earned a Doctor of Sacred Theology degree. He served as rector of Mount St. Mary's Seminary from 1931 to 1940. He was named a domestic prelate in 1932.

=== Auxiliary Bishop of Cincinnati ===
On August 6, 1937, Rehring was appointed auxiliary bishop of Cincinnati and titular bishop of Lunda by Pope Pius XI. He received his episcopal consecration at the Cathedral of the Saint Peter in Chains in Cincinnati on October 7, 1937, from Archbishop John T. McNicholas, with Bishops Joseph H. Albers and Urban John Vehr serving as co-consecrators. As an auxiliary bishop, he served as pastor of St. Mary's Parish in the Hyde Park section of Cincinnati from 1940 to 1950.

=== Bishop of Toledo ===
Rehring was named the fourth bishop of Toledo by Pope Pius XII on July 16, 1950. Rehring attended all four sessions of the Second Vatican Council in Rome between 1962 and 1965. On February 25, 1967, Pope Paul VI accepted Rehring's resignation as bishop of Toledo and appointed him titular bishop of Tunnuna, a post he resigned on December 31, 1970.

George Rehring died in Toledo on February 29, 1976, at age 85.

Catholic Church titles
Preceded by None	Titular Bishop of Tunnuna; 1967–1970	Succeeded by Urbano José Allgaye
Preceded by Karl Joseph Alter	Bishop of Toledo; 1950–1967	Succeeded by John Anthony Donovan
Preceded by Joseph H. Albers, D.D.	Titular Bishop of Lunda; 1937–1950	Succeeded by Luís António Palha Teixeira
