= Rosary Cathedral (Toledo, Ohio) =

Catholic cathedral church in Ohio, United States

Coordinates: 41°40′21″N 83°33′22″W

Our Lady, Queen of the Most Holy Rosary Cathedral
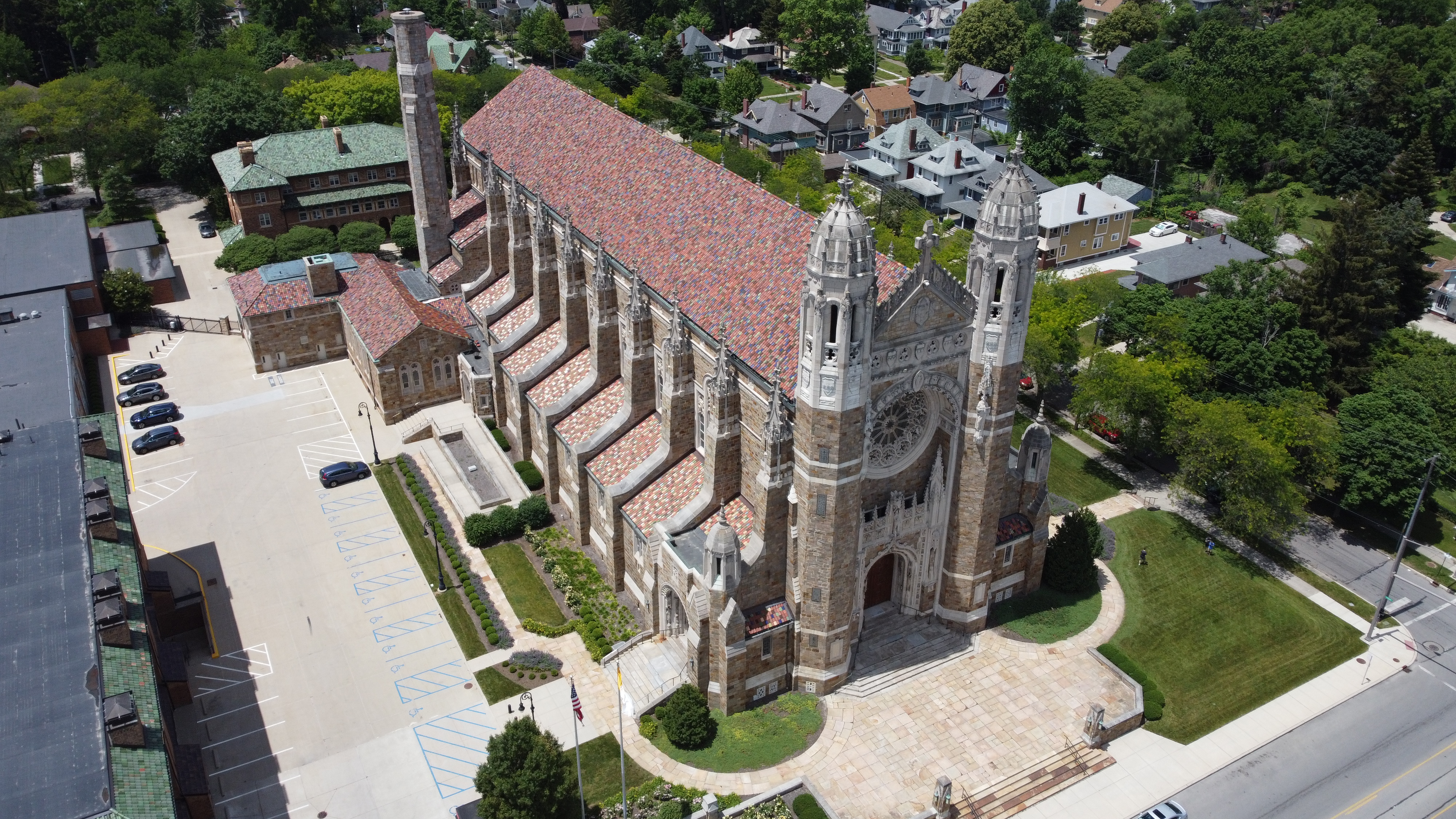
- Our Lady, Queen of the Most Holy Rosary Cathedral
- Location: 2535 Collingwood Boulevard; Toledo, Ohio
- Country: United States
- Denomination: Catholic
- Sui iuris church: Latin Church
- Tradition: Roman Rite
- Website: rosarycathedral.org

History
- Founder: Samuel Stritch
- Dedicated: 1 October 1940; 85 years ago

Architecture
- Architects: John T. Comes original design; William Perry supervising architect

Administration
- Diocese: Toledo

Clergy
- Bishop: Daniel E. Thomas

Our Lady, Queen of the Most Holy Rosary Cathedral is a Catholic church located at 2535 Collingwood Boulevard in the Old West End of Toledo, Ohio, in the United States. Completed in 1931, the cathedral is the mother church of the Diocese of Toledo.

Cathedral officials claim that it was designed with Toledo, Spain, in mind and is the only American cathedral in the Spanish Plateresque style. The cathedral seats 1,400 worshippers.

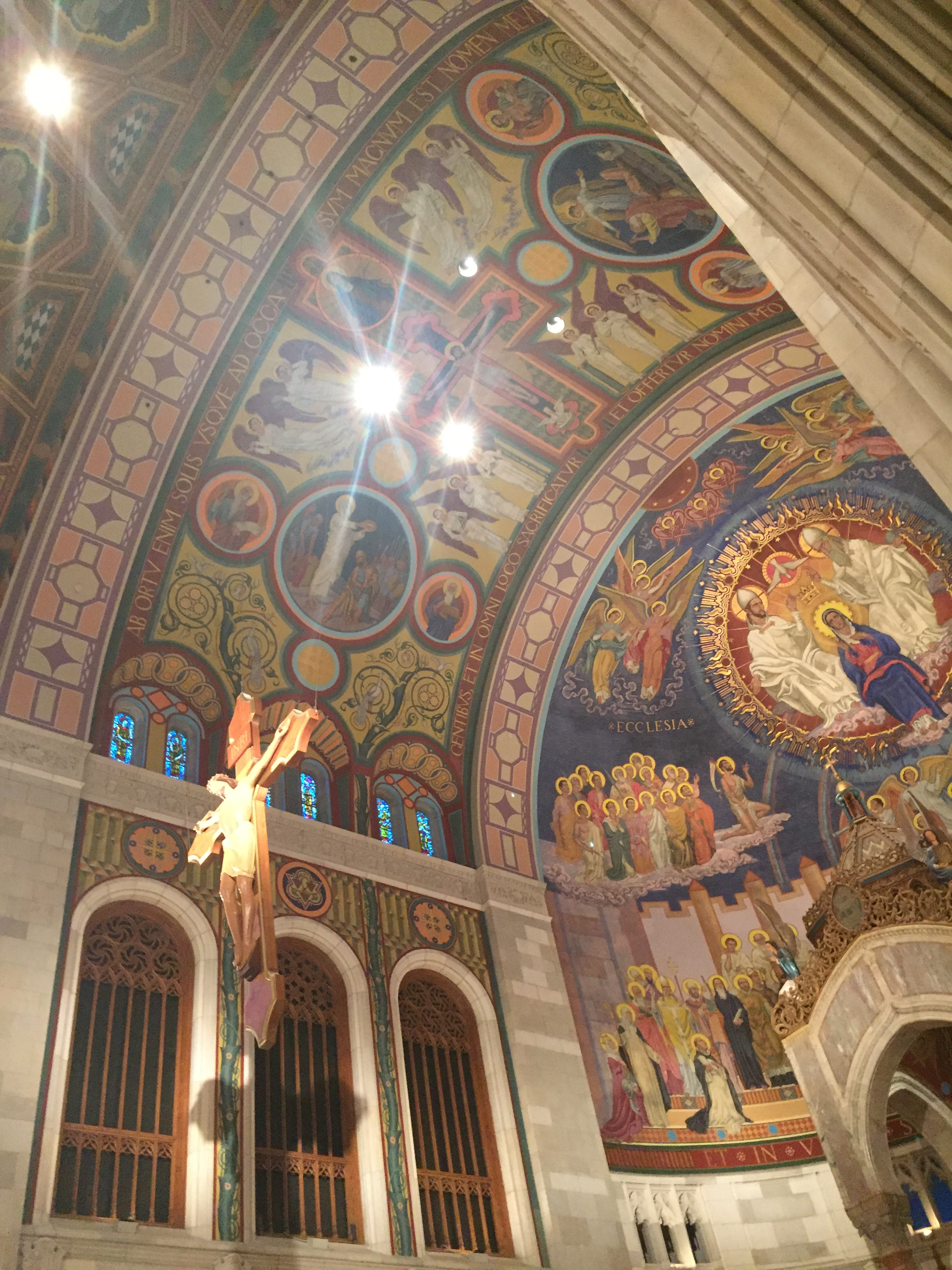
Mosaic depicting the crucifixion over the altar (2016)

== History ==
In 1910, Pope Pius X erected the Diocese of Toledo and appointed Joseph Schrembs as its first bishop. A year later, Schrembs purchased land on Collingwood Boulevard in Toledo for the construction of a cathedral campus. The combination bishop's residence and chancery were completed in 1914, along with the school building. Schrembs erected the cathedral parish in 1915, combining portions of St. Patrick, St. Francis de Sales and St. Ann Parishes. However, construction of the cathedral itself was not yet started.

In 1922 the new bishop of Toledo, Samuel Stritch, hired the architect William Perry of Pittsburgh, Pennsylvania, to design Rosary Cathedral. The ground breaking was in 1925 and the cornerstone was laid in 1926. The cathedral was structurally completed in 1931 at a cost of $3.25 million. Although the cathedral opened for services in 1931, it was not dedicated until 1940. Bishop Karl Joseph Alter presided over the ceremony.

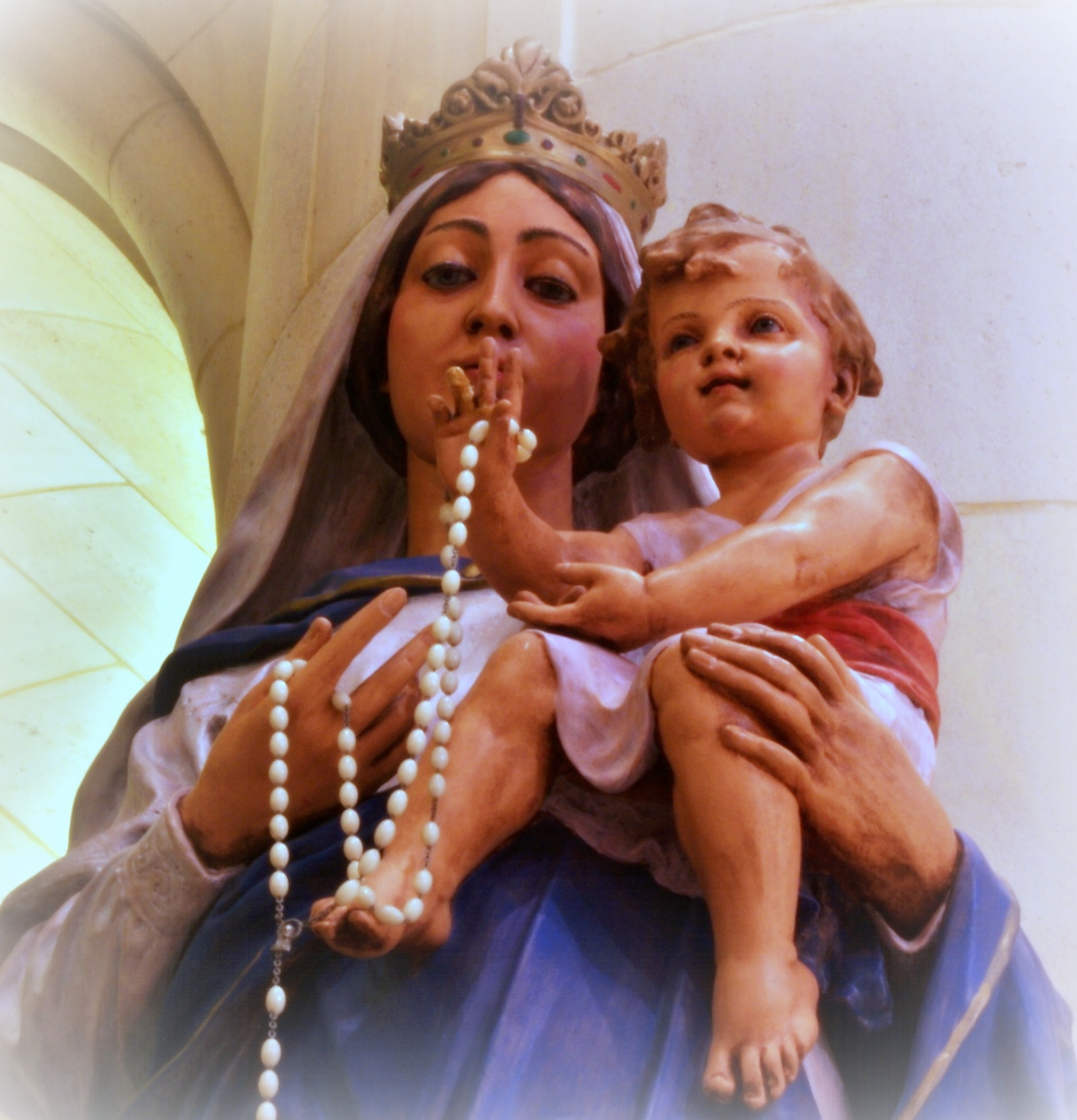
A Madonna and Child statue in the cathedral 2013

The diocese renovated Rosary Cathedral in 1979 to follow liturgical guidelines issued by the Second Vatican Council of the early 1960s.

In 2000, the Rosary Cathedral Parish completed a restoration of the church interior. They cleaned soot deposited by coal- and oil-fired boilers on the interior mosaics. In the 2000s, the parish and diocese re-landscaped the grounds, and re-stoned the paths to the front entrances to match the stonework on the façade. The diocese also installed gates and stone corner-pieces in the cathedral parking lot. The parish also bought a second lot across the street.

== Architecture ==
=== Description ===
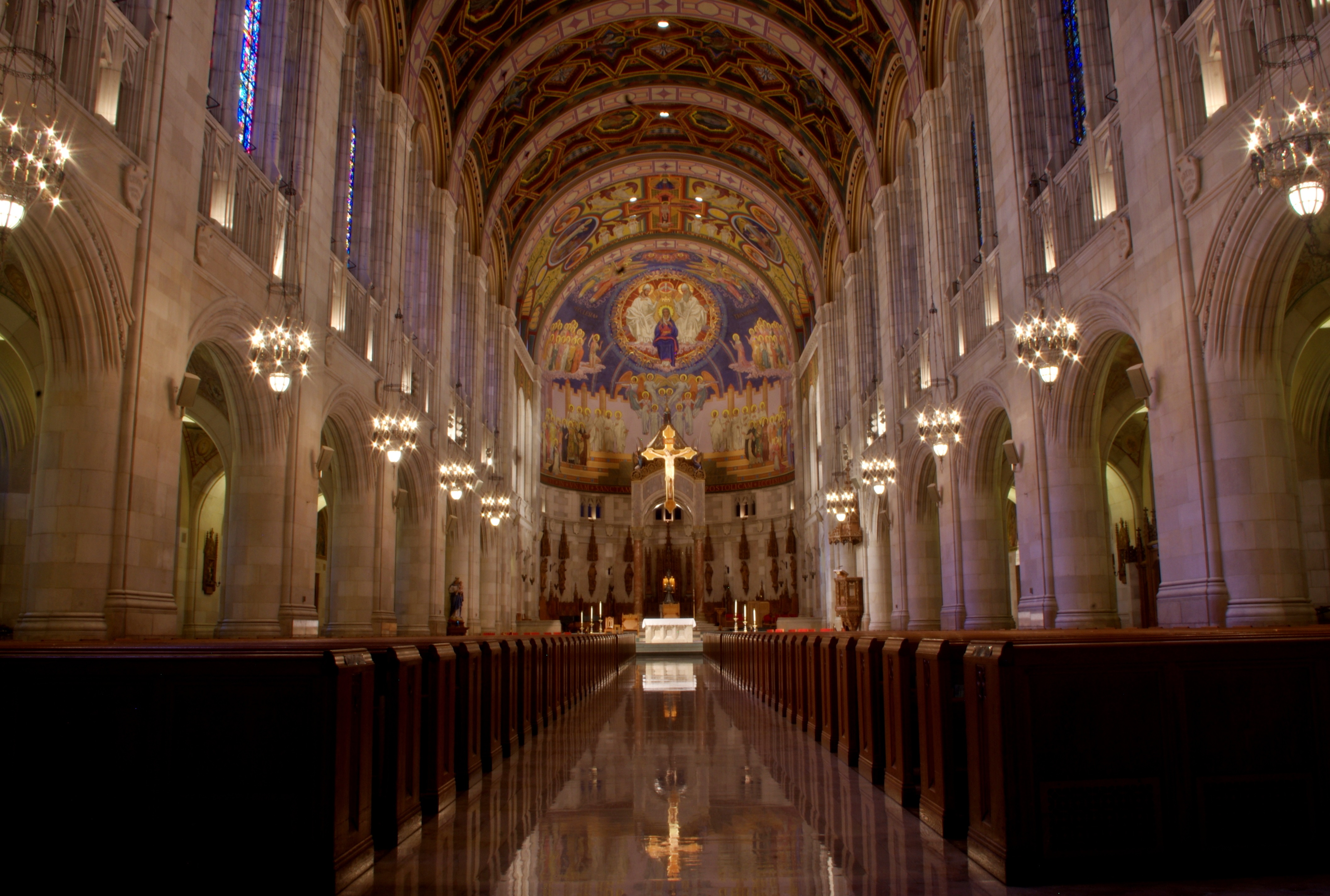
Altar and nave (2013)

The Rosary Cathedral is 285 feet (87 m) in length and 215 feet (66 m) in width. Using a basilica floor plan, the cathedral is constructed entirely of Massachusetts granite with Indiana limestone accents. It is designed in the Plateresque style.

Rosary Cathedral has a single entry door recessed in a barrel-vault arch; it is framed by carved limestone details. Above the doorway is a statue of the Virgin Mary in a carved niche.

=== Facade ===
The facade is surmounted by a crucifix and encircled by a frieze that depicts notable events in the history of the Catholic church.

The cathedral has a 28 ft (8.5 m) rose window with limestone tracery set into a larger arch. The rose window depicts scenes from the life of Mary. It was financed through the donation of pennies by children in the diocese. The diocesan coat of arms is located above the rose window on the pediment.

=== Bell towers ===
Framing the front entry, on the sides of the rose window, are two octagonal bell towers that display carvings of Apostles Peter and Paul. The bells were manufactured in Croyden, England. In addition, a third bell tower was planned to be built where the current baptistery is located. This tower was never constructed.

=== Barrel vault ===
The nave of Rosary Cathedral is topped by a barrel vault; the height from floor to peak is 96 feet (29 m). The vault is divided into seven bays. The bays displays paintings figures from both the Old and New Testaments, created by the American artist Felix Lieftuchter. He used Keim' process to paint them, utilizing mineral paints that do not evaporate or interfere with the cathedral acoustics.

Each bay holds a triple window measuring 26 ft (7.9 m) high and 8 ft (2.4 m) wide. Along the nave are altars dedicated to St. Theresa of Lisieux and Our Lady of Perpetual Help.

=== Blessed Sacrament Chapel ===
The Blessed Sacrament Chapel is lined with tessellated marbles. It contains a 5 feet (1.5 m) tabernacle that replicates the dome of the bell tower of the Cathedral of Saint Mary of the Assumption in Toledo, Spain. The chapel also contains a reproduction of the Descent of the Holy Spirit by the Greek painter El Greco. The aluminum gates of the chapel were displayed at the Smithsonian Institution in Washington, D.C. in 1979.

=== Chancel ===
The main altar is carved from black Marquina Florido marble, imported from Spain. Before the renocation in the 2002, the altar was covered with an oak baldachin supported by marble columns. The pulpit was carved from white oak by the German artisan August Schmidt. Statues of the eight authors of the New Testament of the Bible line the apse. Each statue stands under a carved flèche.

=== Pipe organ ===
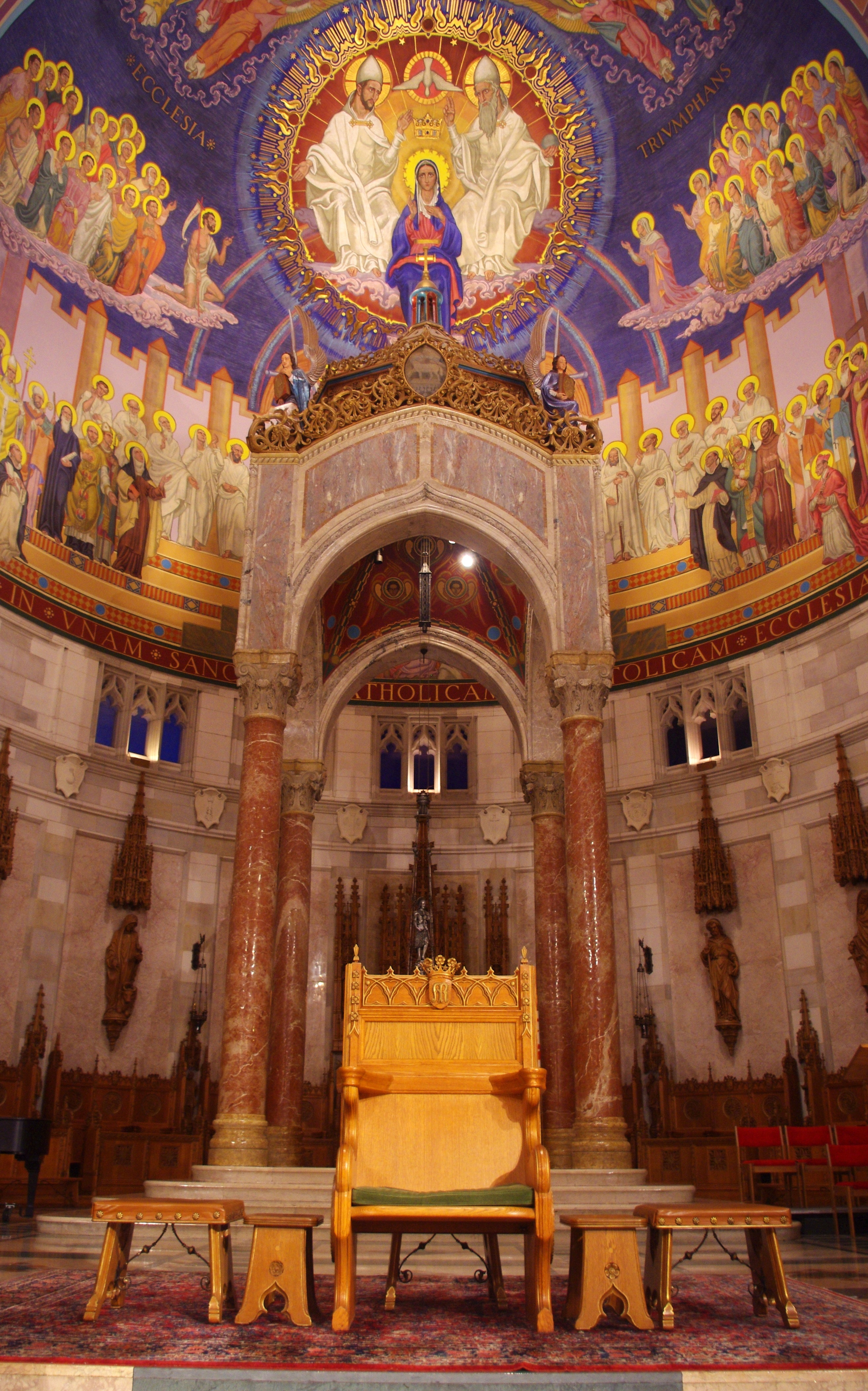
Cathedra and baldachin (2013)

Rosary Cathedral houses a large 4-manual pipe organ, their opus 820 (1930). The instrument was built by Ernest M. Skinner of Boston, Massachusetts; it was dedicated in 1931 by Palmer Christian, professor of organ at the University of Michigan. Claude Lagacé served as organist at Rosary Cathedral from 1954 to 1961During the 1980s, the Skinner pipe organ was restored by Sam Koontz of Ann Arbor, Michigan. In 2009 the Skinner pipe organ received an historical citation from the Organ Historical Society of Villanova, Pennsylvania.

The Skinner pipe organ contains 75 stops and 76 ranks (sets) of pipes, totaling 4,916 pipes. These pipes range in length from 7 inches (18 cm) to over 32 feet (9.8 m).

== See also ==
- List of churches in the Diocese of Toledo, Ohio
- List of Catholic cathedrals in the United States
- List of cathedrals in the United States
- Churches Named for the Rosary
