= John Anthony Donovan =

Canadian prelate (1911–1991)

His Excellency, The Most Reverend John Anthony Donovan
- Bishop of Toledo; Titular Bishop of Rhasus
- Church: Roman Catholic Church
- See: Diocese of Toledo
- Predecessor: George John Rehring
- Successor: James Robert Hoffman
- Other posts: Auxiliary Bishop of Detroit; 1954 to 1967; Titular Bishop of Rhasus

Orders
- Ordination: December 8, 1935 by Francesco Marchetti Selvaggiani
- Consecration: October 26, 1954 by Edward Mooney

Personal details
- Born: August 5, 1911 Chatham, Ontario, Canada
- Died: September 18, 1991 (aged 80) Sylvania, Ohio, US
- Education: Sacred Heart Seminary; Pontifical Gregorian University
- Motto: In fide et lenitate (In faith and gentleness)

John Anthony Donovan (August 5, 1911 – September 18, 1991) was a Canadian-born prelate of the Catholic Church. He served as bishop of the Diocese of Toledo in Ohio from 1967 to 1980. He previously served as an auxiliary bishop of the Archdiocese of Detroit in Michigan from 1954 to 1967.

== Biography ==
=== Early life ===
Donovan was born on August 5, 1911, in Chatham, Ontario, the youngest son in a family of ten. After immigrating to the United States, he attended Sacred Heart Seminary in Detroit, Michigan. He then studied at the Pontifical North American College and the Pontifical Gregorian University in Rome.

=== Priesthood ===
Donovan was ordained to the priesthood in Rome for the Archdiocese of Detroit by Cardinal Francesco Marchetti Selvaggiani on December 8, 1935. He later served as chancellor and vicar general of the archdiocese.

=== Auxiliary Bishop of Detroit ===
On September 6, 1954, Donovan was appointed auxiliary bishop of the Archdiocese of Detroit and Titular Bishop of Rhasus by Pope Pius XII. He received his episcopal consecration at the Cathedral of the Most Blessed Sacrament in Detroit on October 26, 1954, from Cardinal Edward Mooney, with Bishops Allen Babcock and Alexander M. Zaleski serving as co-consecrators. From 1958 to April 1967, he presided over St. Veronica's Parish in East Detroit, Michigan. From 1962 to 1965, he attended all four sessions of the Second Vatican Council in Rome.

=== Bishop of Toledo ===
Donovan was named the fifth bishop of Toledo by Pope Paul VI on February 25, 1967. He was formally installed in Toledo, Ohio, on April 18, 1967.Considered progressive and innovative, Donovan implemented the reforms of the Second Vatican Council in the diocese by joining the Ohio Council of Churches, and establishing a permanent diaconate and a chancery office for divorced, separated, and widowed Catholics. In 1967, he issued a pastoral letter endorsing open housing, which was defeated in a citywide referendum that fall. He also established the Diocesan Development Fund and special programs for Spanish-speaking, African American and elderly Catholics. During his tenure, Donovan also established Resurrection Parish in Lexington, Ohio, in 1969 and St. Joan of Arc Parish in Toledo in 1978. He increased the number of Catholics in the diocese from 301,000 to 348,000.

=== Retirement and death ===
On July 29, 1980, Pope John Paul II accepted Donovan's resignation due to heart disease as bishop of Toledo. John Donovan died at Lake Park Nursing Facility in Sylvania, Ohio, on September 18, 1991, at age 80. He is buried at Calvary Cemetery.

Catholic Church titles
Preceded by George John Rehring	Bishop of Toledo; 1967–1980	Succeeded by James Robert Hoffman
