= Archdiocese of Cincinnati =

Latin Catholic jurisdiction in the US

Coordinates: 39°06′18″N 84°30′44″W

Archdiocese of Cincinnati Archidiœcesis Cincinnatensis
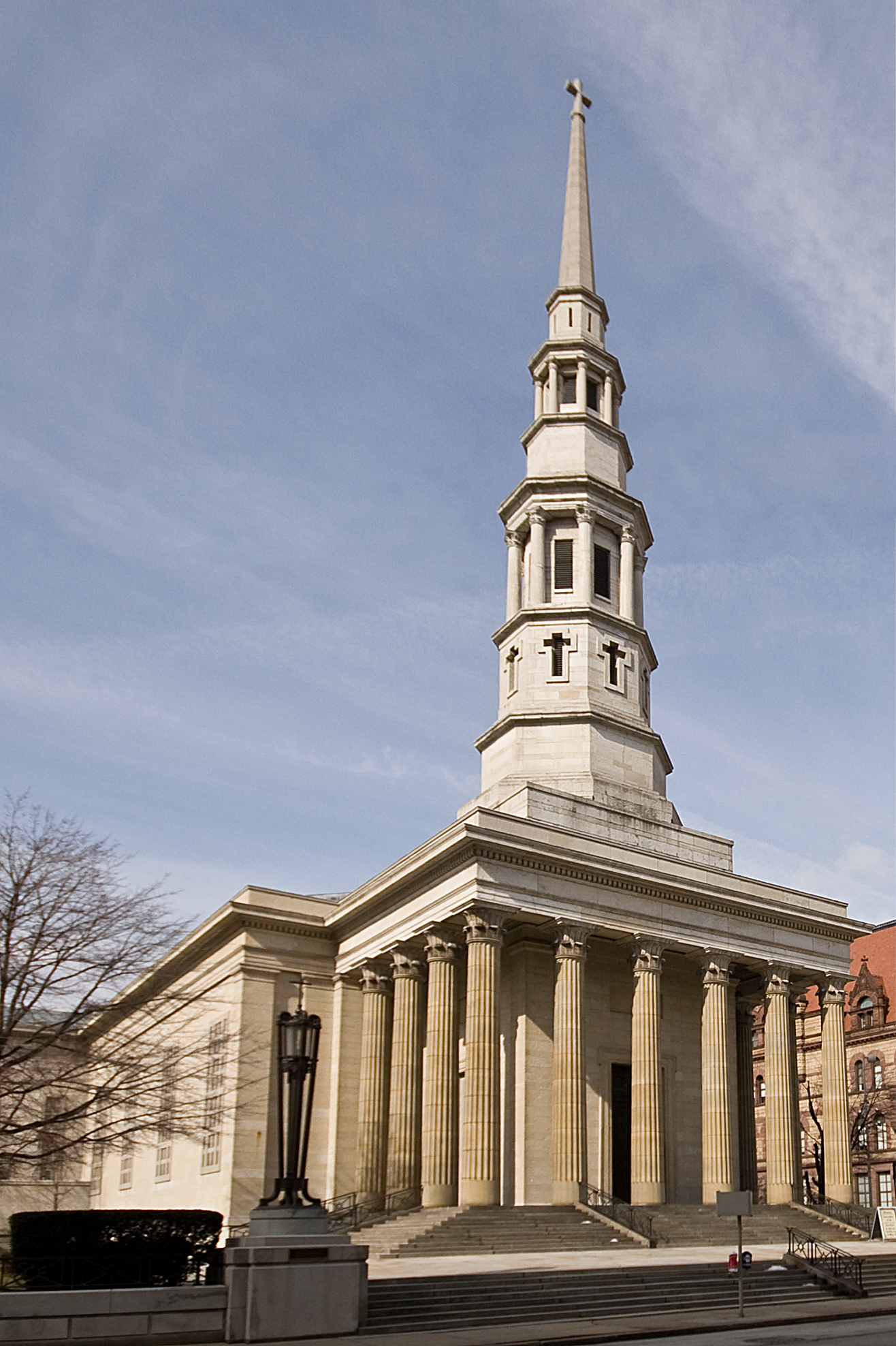
- Cathedral Basilica of Saint Peter in Chains

- Coat of arms

- Flag

Location
- Country: United States
- Territory: Ohio, including the cities of Cincinnati, Dayton, Springfield, and Hamilton
- Ecclesiastical province: Cincinnati

Statistics
- Area: 8,543 sq mi (22,130 km^{2})
- Population: Total; Catholics: (as of 2013); 3,074,000; 471,457 (15.3%)
- Parishes: 214
- Schools: 115

Information
- Denomination: Catholic
- Sui iuris church: Latin Church
- Rite: Roman Rite
- Established: June 19, 1821 (205 years ago)
- Cathedral: Cathedral Basilica of Saint Peter in Chains
- Patron saint: Francis de Sales

Current leadership
- Pope: Leo XIV
- Archbishop: Robert Gerald Casey
- Metropolitan Archbishop: Robert Gerald Casey
- Vicar General: Reverend Steve Angi
- Bishops emeritus: Joseph R. Binzer; Dennis Marion Schnurr

Map
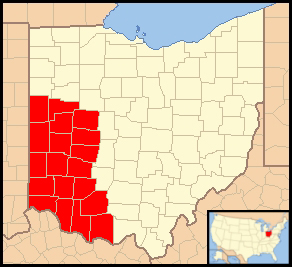

Website
- catholiccincinnati.org

The Archdiocese of Cincinnati (Latin: Archidiœcesis Cincinnatensis) is an archdiocese of the Catholic Church in the State of Ohio. The archbishop is Robert Casey. The mother church is the Cathedral Basilica of St. Peter in Chains in Cincinnati.

== Geography ==
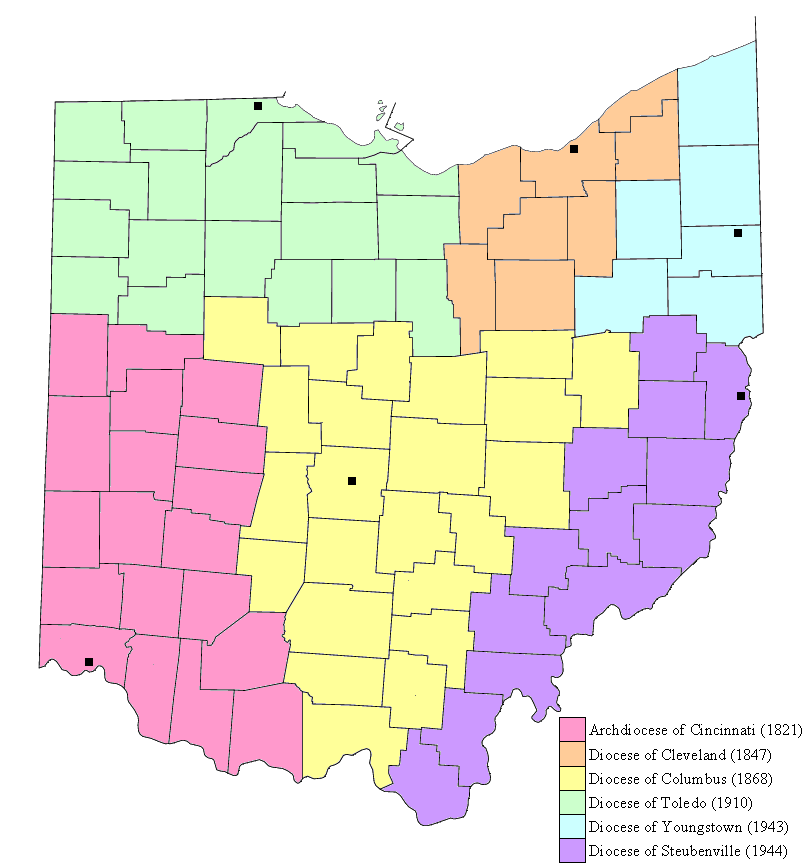
Province of Cincinnati

Cincinnati is the metropolis of the Ecclesiastical Province of Cincinnati, which contains all of Ohio. The province contains the archdiocese and its five suffragan dioceses: Cleveland, Columbus, Steubenville, Toledo and Youngstown.

== History ==
=== 1700 to 1800 ===
During the 17th century, present day Ohio was part of the French colony of New France. The Diocese of Quebec had jurisdiction over the region. However, unlike other parts of the future American Midwest, French missionaries made no attempts to found Catholic missions in Ohio.

In 1763, Ohio Country became part of the British Province of Quebec, forbidden from settlement by American colonists. After the American Revolution ended in 1783, Pope Pius VI erected in 1784 the Prefecture Apostolic of the United States, encompassing the entire territory of the new nation. In 1787, the Ohio area became part of the Northwest Territory of the United States. Pius VI created the Diocese of Baltimore, the first diocese in the United States, to replace the prefecture apostolic in 1789.

=== 1800 to 1847 ===
In 1808, Pope Pius VII erected the Diocese of Bardstown in Kentucky, with jurisdiction over the new state of Ohio along with the other midwest states.

Cincinnati's first Catholic church, Christ Church, was organized in 1819, just beyond the city boundaries. Soon additional parishes were formed in Hamilton and St. Martin, Brown County. Emmanuel Thienpont pioneered many parishes in the archdiocese.

Territory of the Diocese of Cincinnati and Archdiocese of Cincinnati from 1863 to present

Pope Pius VII erected the Diocese of Cincinnati on June 19, 1821, taking all of Ohio from the Diocese of Bardstown. The pope named the missionary Edward Fenwick as the first bishop of Cincinnati. Fenwick travelled to Europe in 1823 to raise funding for the new diocese. He returned in 1826 with resources to begin construction of the cathedral and parochial schools He also founded convents for the Sisters of Charity and the first community of Dominican women in the United States, the Dominicans of St. Catharine. The Sisters of Charity opened the St. Peter's Orphan Asylum for girls in 1829.

In 1829, Fenwick established St. Francis Xavier Seminary in Cincinnati. It is the oldest seminary west of the Appalachian Mountains in the United States. In 1831, Fenwick initiated publication of The Catholic Telegraph newspaper. That same year, he opened the Athenaeum in Cincinnati to educate lay workers.

After Fenwick died in 1832, Pope Gregory XVI named John Purcell as the second bishop of Cincinnati. At the time of his installation, the diocese had only one Catholic church to serve thousands of new Catholic German and Irish Immigrants. Purcell founded Holy Trinity Parish in Cincinnati in 1834, the first German language church in the diocese. The first Catholic church in Dayton, Emmanuel Church, opened in 1837. It was followed in 1842 by the dedication of St. Mary's Church, the oldest existing parish in Cincinnati.

Purcell began construction of Saint Peter in Chains Cathedral, which was consecrated in 1846. Seeking a larger seminary to replace St. Francis Xavier, Purcell in 1851 constructed Mount St. Mary's of the West Seminary on Price Hill in Cincinnati. To staff the new seminary and school, Purcell invited the Jesuit Fathers into the diocese. He also established St. Aloysius Orphan Asylum for German-speaking boys in 1831.

=== 1847 to 1900 ===
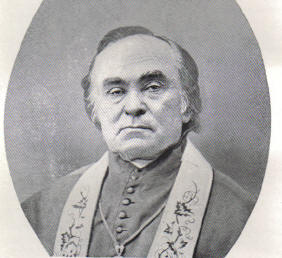
Archbishop Purcell (1883)

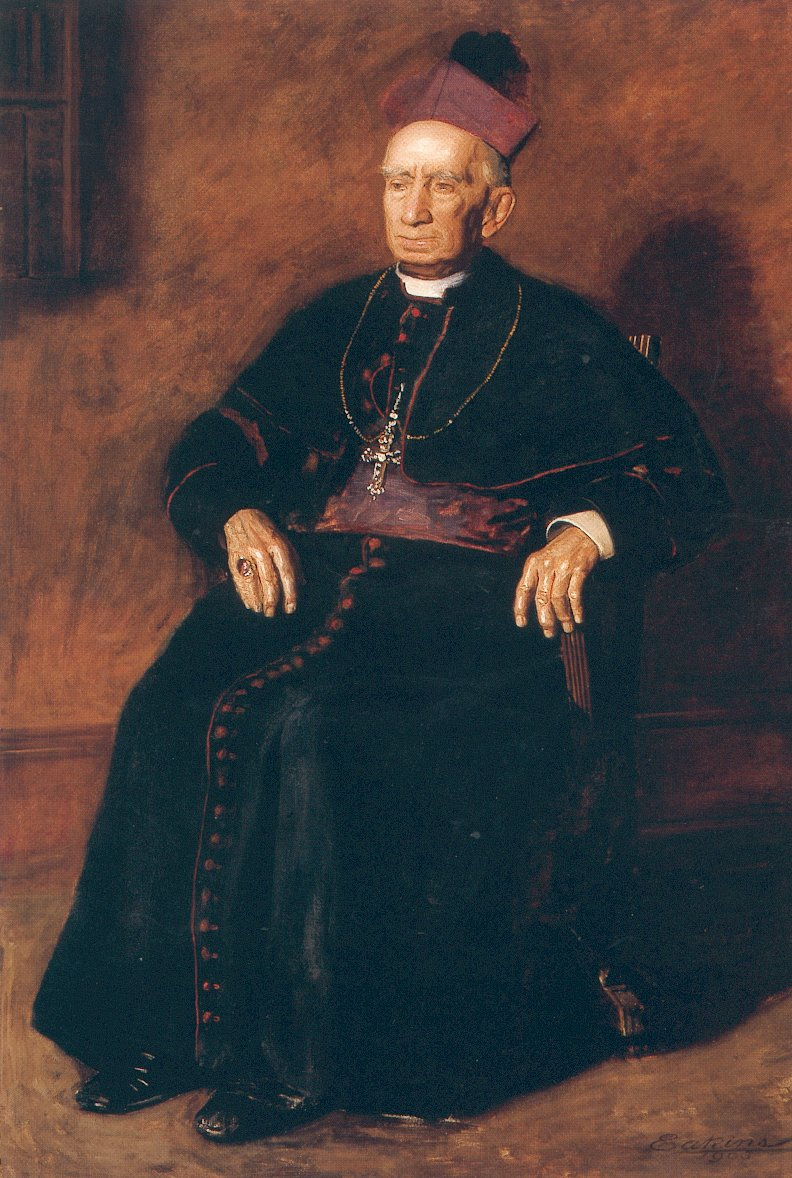
Archbishop Elder (1903)

In 1847, Pope Pius IX erected the Diocese of Cleveland, taking northeastern Ohio from the Diocese of Cincinnati However, the border line between the dioceses, set by the Vatican, cut through multiple counties. To simplify administration, Purcell and Bishop Louis Rappe of Cleveland, decided that:

...the counties of Mercer, Auglaize, Hardin, Marion, Morrow, Knox, Tuscarawas, Carroll, Jefferson, which belong to the diocese of Cincinnati shall constitute the northern boundary of the diocese of Cincinnati. And that all the counties north of those just named, shall compose the diocese of Cleveland. Holmes county, which is for the greater part south of the line above traced, is by mutual consent, assigned to the diocese of Cleveland.

In 1850, Pope Pius IX elevated the Diocese of Cincinnati to an archdiocese with the dioceses of Louisville, Detroit, and Cleveland as its suffragans. Purcell became the first archbishop of Cincinnati. Purcell in 1852 purchased a small hospital in Cincinnati for the Sisters of Charity, who opened St. John's Hotel for Invalids. The first Catholic hospital in the archdiocese, it is today TriHealth Good Samaritan Hospital.

In 1853, Purcell alienated some of Cincinnati's Protestants by arguing that Catholics should not be taxed to support public schools. Later that year, he created controversy when he invited Cardinal Gaetano Bedini, the emissary of Pope Pius IX, to visit Cincinnati. Many German Protestant "Forty-Eighters", who had fled Europe after the failed revolutions of 1848, saw Bedini as a symbol of oppression due to his role in putting down a revolution in the Papal States in 1849. They organized a protest march to Purcell's residence, where Bedini was staying, on Christmas Day 1853. When the demonstrators clashed with police, several were injured and one died.

The Vatican in 1868 erected the Diocese of Columbus from the archdiocese, taking "the territory from the Ohio River to the Scioto River ... together with the Counties of Franklin, Delaware and Morrow." The end of Purcell's long tenure as bishop and archbishop was marked by scandal. Many parishioners in the archdiocese, distrustful of banks after the Panic of 1873, had begun depositing funds with the archdiocese for safekeeping. These funds ultimately amounted to $3.6 million. However, the archdiocese fund was hit with a bank run in 1877, rendering it insolvent and unable to pay back all the depositors.

The Franciscan Sisters in 1878 opened St. Elizabeth Hospital, the first Catholic hospital in Dayton. It later became the Franciscan Medical Center, which closed in 2000.

In 1880, Bishop William Elder of the Diocese of Natchez was appointed coadjutor archbishop in Cincinnati by Pope Leo XIII to assist Purcell. After Purcell died in 1883, Elder automatically became archbishop.

Elder became archbishop when the archdiocese was facing severe financial problems. Elder systematically organized the administration of the archdiocese. He reopened Mount Saint Mary Seminary in 1887, which had been closed since 1879. He instituted the office of chancellor and insisted on annual reports from clergy and parishes in order to reduce the archdiocesan debt. In 1891, after 14 years of litigation, a court found that the archdiocese owed $140,000 to parishioners who had lost money during the 1877 bank run. Elder accepted the verdict in 1892 and assessed parishes to repay the debt in full.

=== 1900 to 1970 ===
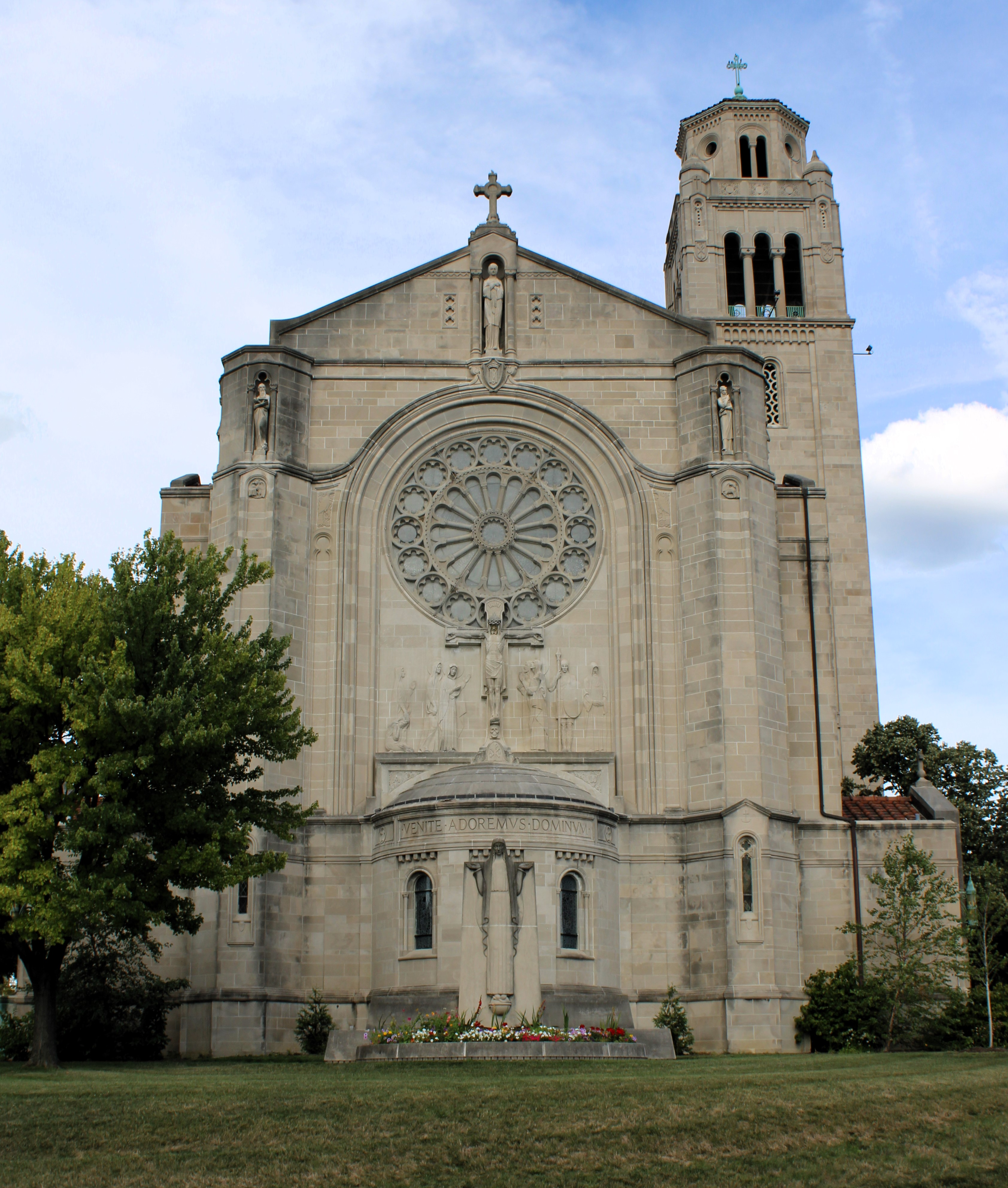
St. Monica Church, Cincinnati, cathedral from 1938 to 1957 (2023)

Bishop Henry K. Moeller of Columbus was named coadjutor archbishop in Cincinnati by Pope Pius X in 1903. When Elder died in 1904, Moeller succeeded him as the fourth archbishop of Cincinnati. During World War I, Moeller successfully petitioned the Vatican for an end to national parishes in the archdiocese and permission to formulate parish boundaries. In 1921, Moeller condemned several popular dances (including the shimmy and camel walk) as well as bare shoulders on women at church social functions. He died in 1925.

Bishop John T. McNicholas of the Diocese of Detroit was appointed the fourth archbishop of Cincinnati by Pope Pius XI in 1925. The 1928 US presidential election, featured the first Catholic to win a major party nomination, New York Governor Alfred E. Smith. McNicholas addressed accusations that Smith as president would take orders from the Vatican on running the United States. McNicholas declared that "we, as American Catholics, owe no civil allegiance to the Vatican State." In 1944, the Vatican erected the Diocese of Steubenville from portions of the Diocese of Columbus and simultaneously transferred the eastern counties from the Archdiocese of Cincinnati to Columbus.

After McNicholas died in 1950, Pope Pius XII named Bishop Karl Alter of Toledo as the next archbishop of Cincinnati. During his administration, Alter established 98 churches, 94 elementary schools, 14 high schools, 79 rectories, and 55 convents. He also instituted a priests' senate and an archdiocesan school board composed of lay members, and encouraged the formation of parish councils. Alter undertook a restoration of Saint Peter in Chains Cathedral. He discontinued first grade in the parochial schools in 1964 because of high costs and overcrowded classrooms. Alter retired in 1969.

=== 1970 to present ===
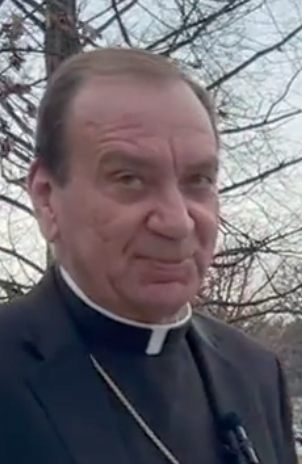
Archbishop Schnurr (2023)

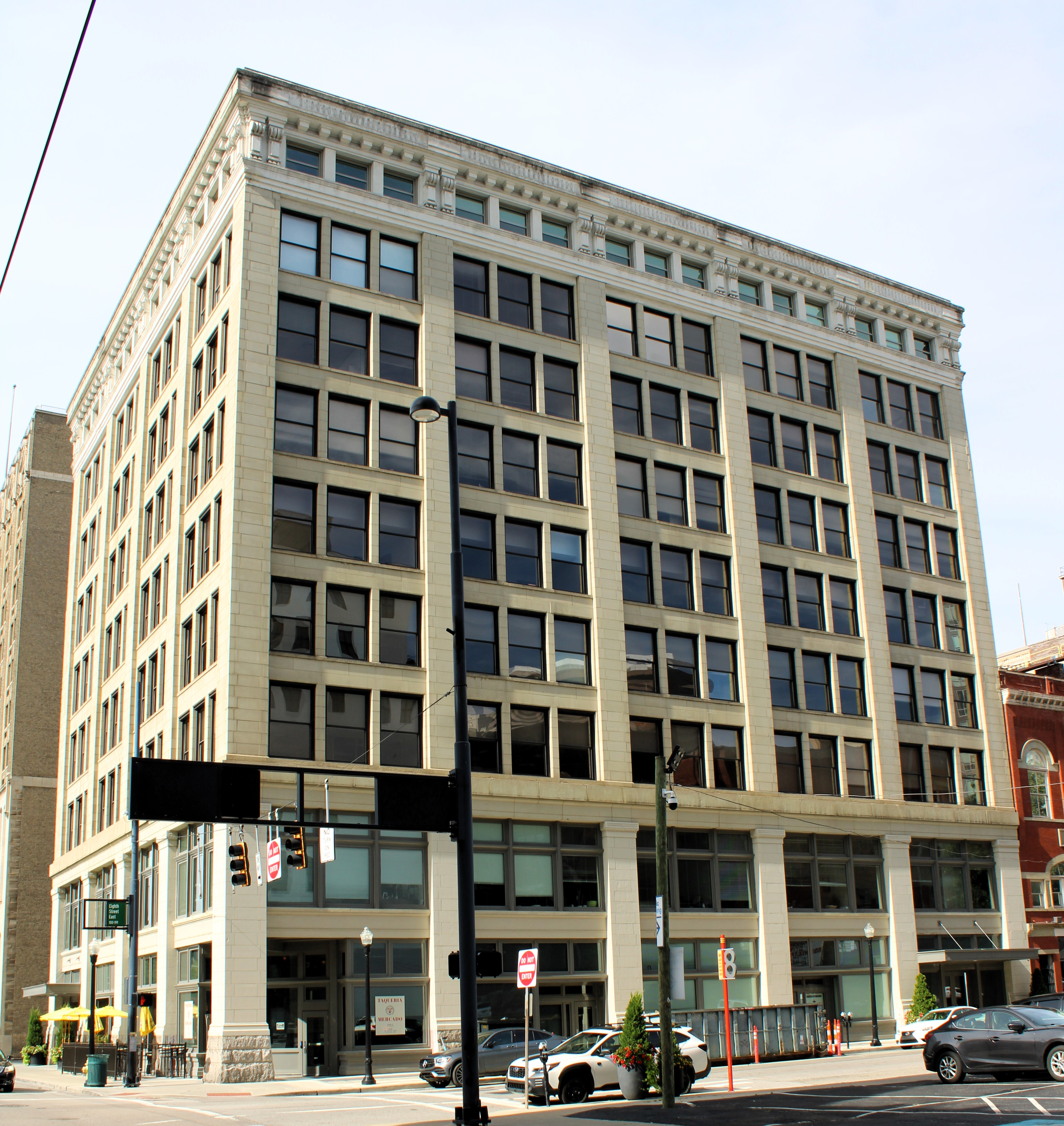
Archdiocesan Pastoral Center, Cincinnati, Ohio (2023)

Bishop Paul Leibold of the Diocese of Evansville succeeded Alter as archbishop, being named by Pope Paul VI in 1969. Leibold strengthened the priests' senate, the pastoral council, and the parish councils. He also launched the archdiocese's sixth synod, Synod '71. In 1958, Sister Mary Ephrem Neuzil, an Ohio nun, claimed to have seen apparitions of Mary, mother of Jesus and messages from St. Joseph. Leibold, who had previously acted as a spiritual advisor to Neuzil, allowed her to publish two pamphlets about her experiences. He also commissioned a wooden plaque with an image of Our Lady of America, a title of Mary, for display at the New Riegel convent. In 1971, Leibold criticized composer Leonard Bernstein's theatrical work Mass, terming it as offensive.

After Leibold died in 1972, Paul VI appointed Bishop Joseph Bernardin, general secretary of the National Conference of Catholic Bishops, as the next archbishop of Cincinnati. During his tenure, Bernardin worked to improve relations between Catholics and Jews and strove for better understanding between the Catholic Church and Protestant denominations. He became archbishop of Chicago in 1982.

To replace Bernardin in Cincinnati, Pope John Paul II selected Auxiliary Bishop Daniel Pilarczyk of Cincinnati in 1982. In 1991, George Cooley from Guardian Angels Parish in Mount Washington, pleaded guilty to sexually molesting four boys during the 1980s. He was laicized soon after his conviction. In November 2003, following a sexual abuse scandal and two-year investigation by the Hamilton County prosecutor's office, Archbishop Pilarczyk entered a plea of nolo contendere regarding five misdemeanor charges of failure to report allegations of child molestation from the 1970s and 1980s. The court fined the archdiocese $10,000. In 2008, Pope Benedict XVI named Bishop Dennis Schnurr of the Diocese of Duluth as coadjutor archbishop in Cincinnati to assist Pilarczyk. When he retired in 2009, Schnurr automatically replaced him. In 2010, Schnurr revoked archdiocese permission for a "Violence Against Women" event at Seton High School in Cincinnati because one of the speakers supported abortion legalization. The sponsors disinvited the speaker, but the archdiocese still denied its support for the event.

In July 2018, Geoff Drew was accused of sending inappropriate text messages to a 17-year-old boy. In August 2019, Schnurr removed Binzer from his position as head of priest personnel. In May 2020, the Vatican accepted Binzer's resignation as auxiliary bishop in Cincinnati. In August 2019, police arrested Drew and charged him with nine counts of sex abuse while serving as a music teacher at St. Ignatius School. He pleaded guilty in December 2021 and was sentenced to seven years in prison.

In May 2020, Schnurr decided not to renew the contract of Jim Zimmerman, a teacher at Archbishop Alter High School in Kettering, because Zimmerman was part of a same-sex marriage. A teacher at the school for 23 years, Zimmerman had been open about his marriage with school officials, other faculty and students. According to Zimmerman, his principal told him that a community member had alerted Schnurr about the marriage. Zimmerman's supporters accused Schnurr of homophobia, which he strongly denied. In July 2021, Schnurr said that he disapproved of a town hall being held by President Joe Biden at Mount Saint Joseph University in Cincinnati, but admitted he had no power to block it. Schnurr did not explain his reasoning. Schnurr said that he would have never approved this event on archdiocese property.

In October 2021, Schnurr announced a plan for the restructuring of the archdiocese that could close 70% of its churches. Parishes were to be grouped into "parish families" overseen by a single pastor. In the long term, each parish family was expected to merge its parishes into a single parish. Reorganization plans were scheduled to be finalized in 2022. Barry Stechschulte in October 2024 resigned from St. Susanna Parish in Mason, Ohio. It had been revealed that in 2012 he had ordered the destruction of a computer hard drive that contained inappropriate pictures of children stored there by someone else. Stechschulte did not report the images to police until 2012. Stechschulte was transferred to a different parish.

Pope Francis accepted Schnurr's resignation on February 12, 2025, and named Bishop Robert G. Casey as archbishop of Cincinnati. Schnurr was appointed by Pope Francis to serve as apostolic administrator until Casey's installation.

== Religious orders and congregations ==
Members of religious orders and congregations staff schools and parishes in the Archdiocese of Cincinnati and serve in a variety of social service roles. Sarah Peter, a prominent Catholic convert and philanthropist, helped finance the relocation of many religious sisters from Europe to Cincinnati during the 19th century.

== Bishops ==
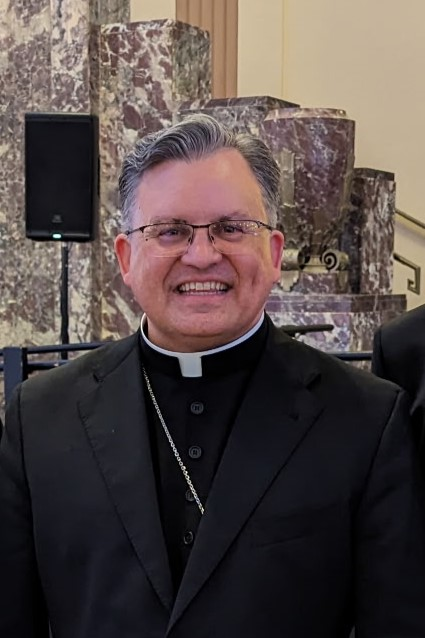
Archbishop Casey (2025)

=== Bishops of Cincinnati ===
1. Edward Fenwick (1822–1832)
2. John Baptist Purcell (1833–1850), elevated to archbishop

=== Archbishops of Cincinnati ===
1. John Baptist Purcell (1850–1883)
2. William Henry Elder (1883–1903; coadjutor archbishop 1880–1883)
3. Henry K. Moeller (1903–1925; coadjutor archbishop 1903)
  - Joseph Chartrand (appointed 1925, did not take effect)
4. John Timothy McNicholas (1925–1950)
5. Karl Joseph Alter (1950–1969)
6. Paul Francis Leibold (1969–1972)
7. Joseph Bernardin (1972–1982), appointed archbishop of Chicago (cardinal in 1983)
8. Daniel Edward Pilarczyk (1982–2009)
9. Dennis Marion Schnurr (2009–2025; coadjutor archbishop 2008–2009)
10. Robert Gerald Casey (2025–present)

=== Former auxiliary bishops ===
- Sylvester Horton Rosecrans (1861–1868), appointed bishop of Columbus
- Joseph H. Albers (1929–1937), appointed bishop of Lansing
- George John Rehring (1937–1950), appointed bishop of Toledo
- Clarence George Issenmann (1954–1957), appointed bishop of Columbus
- Paul Francis Leibold (1958–1966), appointed bishop of Evansville and later archbishop of Cincinnati (see above)
- Edward Anthony McCarthy (1965–1969), appointed bishop of Phoenix and later coadjutor archbishop and archbishop of Miami
- Nicholas Thomas Elko (1970–1985)
- Daniel Edward Pilarczyk (1974–1982), appointed archbishop of Cincinnati (see above)
- James Henry Garland (1984–1992), appointed bishop of Marquette
- Carl Kevin Moeddel (1993–2007)
- Joseph R. Binzer (2011–2020)

=== Other diocesan priests who became bishops ===
- John Martin Henni, bishop and later archbishop of Milwaukee (1829–1843)
- Henry Damian Juncker, bishop of Alton (1834–1857)
- Joshua Maria Young, bishop of Erie (1838–1853)
- John Baptist Lamy, vicar apostolic of New Mexico and later bishop and archbishop of Santa Fe (1838–1850)
- James Frederick Bryan Wood, coadjutor bishop and later bishop and archbishop of Philadelphia (1844–1857)
- John Henry Luers, bishop of Fort Wayne (1846–1857)
- Caspar Henry Borgess, coadjutor bishop and later bishop of Detroit (1848–1870)
- Richard Gilmour, bishop of Cleveland (1852–1872)
- John Quinlan, bishop of Mobile (1852–1859)
- Augustus Toebbe, bishop of Covington (1854–1869)
- Joseph Gregory Dwenger, bishop of Fort Wayne (1859–1867)
- Frederic Baraga, Sault Sainte Marie and Marquette (1865-1868)
- Henry Richter, bishop of Grand Rapids (1865–1883)
- Francis Beckman, appointed bishop of Lincoln and later archbishop of Dubuque (1902–1923)
- Urban John Vehr, bishop and later archbishop of Denver (1915–1931)
- Francis Augustine Thill, bishop of Salina (1920–1938) (He became bishop of Concordia in 1938, and was still in office there when the diocese name was changed from Concordia to Salina in 1944.)
- Anthony John King Mussio, bishop of Steubenville (1935–1945)
- Christopher Cardone, bishop of Auki later archbishop of Honiara (1986–1988)
- John Joseph Kaising, auxiliary bishop for the Military Services, USA (1962–2000)
- Robert Daniel Conlon, bishop of Steubenville and later bishop of Joliet (1977–2002)
- Earl K. Fernandes, bishop of Columbus (2022–present)

== Education ==
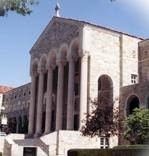
Athenaeum of Ohio, Cincinnati, Ohio (2008)

The archdiocese administers 110 associated parochial schools and diocesan elementary schools. As of 2021, over 73,000 students were enrolled in the archdiocese's 115 schools, making it the sixth largest Catholic school system in the United States. In Hamilton County, where most private schools were run by the archdiocese, nearly a quarter of students (36,684 as of 2007) attended private schools, a rate only second to St. Louis County in Missouri.

The 23 Catholic high schools in the region operated under varying degrees of archdiocesan control. Several were owned and operated by the archdiocese, while other interparochial schools were run by groups of parishes under archdiocesan supervision. Most of the interparochial and non-archdiocesan high schools were operated by religious institutes.

Most of the schools' athletic teams belonged to the Greater Catholic League, which consisted of a co-ed division, the Girls Greater Cincinnati League, and a division for all-male schools.

The archdiocese also included 92 parochial and diocesan elementary schools, with a combined enrollment of 30,312, as of 2011 (ACE Consulting 2011, p. 91). These schools were in the urban and suburban areas of Cincinnati and Dayton, as well as some of the smaller towns within the archdiocesan boundaries. Each parochial school is owned and operated by its parish, rather than by the archdiocese's Catholic Schools Office.

In March 2011, the archdiocese announced its intention of eventually unifying the schools under one school system. As of 2015, the interim superintendent of Catholic Schools was Susie Gibbons.

High schools in the Archdiocese of Cincinnati
Name	Founded	Sex	Location	Ownership
Archbishop Alter	1962	Co-ed	Kettering	Archdiocesan
Badin	1966	Co-ed	Hamilton	Interparochial
Carroll	1961	Co-ed	Dayton	Archdiocesan
Catholic Central	1929	Co-ed	Springfield	Archdiocesan
Chaminade Julienne	1973	Co-ed	Dayton	Marianists, Srs. of Notre Dame
DePaul Cristo Rey	2011	Co-ed	Cincinnati	Srs. of Charity
Elder	1922	Male	Cincinnati	Interparochial
Bishop Fenwick	1952	Co-ed	Middletown	Archdiocesan
La Salle	1961	Male	Cincinnati	Archdiocesan
Lehman Catholic	1970	Co-ed	Sidney	Archdiocesan
Archbishop McNicholas	1951	Co-ed	Cincinnati	Interparochial
Mercy McAuley	2018	Female	Cincinnati	Sisters of Mercy
Moeller	1958	Male	Cincinnati	Marianist
Mount Notre Dame	1860	Female	Reading	Sisters of Notre Dame de Namur
Purcell Marian	1980	Co-ed	Cincinnati	Archdiocesan
Roger Bacon	1928	Co-ed	St. Bernard	Interparochial
Royalmont Academy	1996	Co-ed	Mason	Independent
Seton	1854	Female	Cincinnati	Parochial
St. Rita School for the Deaf	1915	Co-ed	Cincinnati	Independent
St. Ursula Academy	1910	Female	Cincinnati	Independent (Ursulines)
St. Xavier	1831	Male	Cincinnati	Jesuit
Summit Country Day	1890	Co-ed	Cincinnati	Independent
Ursuline Academy	1896	Female	Cincinnati	Independent

== Media ==
=== Publications ===
The Archdiocese of Cincinnati publishes a monthly magazine, The Catholic Telegraph. Founded as a weekly newspaper in 1831, it is the oldest diocesan newspaper and second oldest Catholic newspaper in the United States. The Telegraph converted to a magazine format in 2020. Its defunct sister newspaper, Der Wahrheitsfreund, was the first German Catholic newspaper in the country.

The national magazine St. Anthony Messenger is published in Cincinnati by the Franciscan Friars with the archdiocese's ecclesiastical approval.

=== Radio stations ===
Several area Catholic radio stations, owned by separate entities, serve the archdiocese:

- WNOP 740 AM licensed to Newport, Kentucky. "Sacred Heart Radio"
- WPFB 910 AM located in Middletown.
- WULM 1600 AM located in Springfield "Radio Maria" (based at KJMJ in Alexandria, Louisiana) serving portions of the Dayton area: a fifty-mile radius in the daytime. (ten mile radius at night) plus a sister station:
- WHJM 88.7 FM licensed in Anna, transmitting from Botkins with a live studio located in Minster. It serves a forty-mile radius within the Upper Miami Valley and southern portions of the Lima area. Radio Maria also streams on the internet
- WNKN 105.9 FM in Middletown, affiliate station of Relevant Radio
- WLRU-LP 106.9 FM in Hillsboro

Other stations reach into portions of the archdiocese:

- WVSG 820 AM located in Columbus "St. Gabriel Radio" (the former WOSU (AM)).
- WRDF 106.3 FM licensed in Columbia City, Indiana with studio in Fort Wayne, Indiana, as "Redeemer Radio" plus an audio stream.
