= Mary Manse College =

Coordinates: 41°40′07.5″N 83°33′22.4″W

Mary Manse College was a Catholic institution of higher education located in Toledo, Ohio from 1922 until 1975. The college was founded in 1922 at the request of the Bishop of Toledo, Samuel Stritch. Operated by the Ursuline Order of nuns, Mary Manse opened in September 1922 with thirty students. The Ohio State Board of Education recognized the school as degree-granting institution in 1926, and received accreditation by the North Central Association of Colleges and Schools in 1933. Mary Manse offered degrees in arts and sciences, music, medical technology, and nursing education. The school operated as a women's college until 1971, at which time it became coeducational.

The college was hard hit by the 1970s recession, and was forced to declare bankruptcy in 1975. The Higher Learning Commission lists Mary Manse College as having accreditation status of "inactive".

Collingwood Arts Center and Saint Angela Hall are remaining buildings of Mary Manse.

Bowling Green State University's office of Registration and Records offers transcript services for graduates of Mary Manse College.

== The Mary Manse College Collection ==
In May 1976, Bowling Green State University's Center for Archival Collections received "administrative records, correspondence, subject files, literary productions, legal and financial documents, scrapbooks, printed material, and audio-visual materials" from Mary Manse College. For the first twenty-five years, the collection was only open to researchers with written permission from the Superior general of the Ursuline Sisters of Toledo, however, on 1 July 2001 the collection was opened to the public.
