= Daniel Edward Pilarczyk =

American Roman Catholic archbishop (1934–2020)

His Excellency, The Most Reverend Daniel Edward Pilarczyk
- Archbishop of Cincinnati; Titular Bishop of Hodelm
- Archdiocese: Cincinnati
- Appointed: October 30, 1982
- Installed: December 20, 1982
- Term ended: December 21, 2009
- Predecessor: Joseph Bernardin
- Successor: Dennis Marion Schnurr
- Previous post: Auxiliary Bishop of Cincinnati (1974–1982)

Orders
- Ordination: December 20, 1959 by Gregorio Pietro Agagianian
- Consecration: December 20, 1974 by Joseph Bernardin, Nicholas Elko, and James William Malone

Personal details
- Born: August 12, 1934 Dayton, Ohio, U.S.
- Died: March 22, 2020 (aged 85) Cincinnati, Ohio, U.S.
- Denomination: Roman Catholic Church
- Education: Pontifical Urbaniana University; Xavier University; University of Cincinnati
- Motto: Bonitas justitia veritas (Goodness, justice, truth)
- Coat of arms

Styles of Daniel Edward Pilarczyk
- Reference style: His Excellency; The Most Reverend
- Spoken style: Your Excellency
- Religious style: Archbishop

Daniel Edward Pilarczyk (August 12, 1934 – March 22, 2020) was an American Catholic prelate who served as Archbishop of Cincinnati from 1982 to 2009. He previously served there as an auxiliary bishop from 1974 to 1982.

== Early life and education ==
Daniel Pilarczyk was born on August 12, 1934 in Dayton, Ohio, the only child of Daniel Joseph and Frieda (Hilgefort) Pilarczyk. After receiving his early education at Our Lady of Mercy and St. Anthony parochial schools, he attended Sacred Heart Latin School. At age 14, he entered Saint Gregory Seminary in Cincinnati, Ohio. In 1953, he was sent to Rome to continue his studies at the Pontifical Urbaniana University, where he obtained a Licentiate of Philosophy in 1956 and a Licentiate of Sacred Theology in 1960.

== Priesthood ==
Pilarczyk was ordained to the priesthood for the Archdiocese of Cincinnati at the Urbaniana by Cardinal Grégoire-Pierre Agagianian on December 20, 1959. He remained in Rome for his postgraduate studies, earning a Doctor of Sacred Theology from the Urbaniana in 1961.

Upon his return to the United States, the archdiocese assigned Pilarczyk as assistant chancellor and a curate at St. Louis Parish in Cincinnati. He then taught Latin and Greek at St. Gregory Seminary from 1963 to 1974. Pilarczyk received a Master's degree from Xavier University in Cincinnati in 1965. He was named rector of St. Gregory Seminary in 1968; at age 31, he was the youngest man to hold that position. He earned a Ph.D. from the University of Cincinnati in 1969.

== Episcopacy ==
=== Auxiliary Bishop of Cincinnati ===
On November 12, 1974, Pilarczyk was appointed as an auxiliary bishop of Cincinnati and titular bishop of Hodelm by Pope John Paul II. He received his episcopal consecration at the Cathedral of Saint Peter in Chains in Cincinnati on December 20, 1974, from Archbishop Joseph Bernardin, with Archbishop Nicholas Elko and Bishop James W. Malone serving as co-consecrators.

From 1974 to 1982, he served as director of the archdiocesan Educational Services and chairman of the archdiocesan Commission on Education. He also served as chair of the board of St. Rita School for the Deaf from 1977 to 1982. He once said,

Education means development, growth. When God creates us, He doesn't quite finish it. He lets us do some of the finishing touches. That's what education is. It's a wonderful gift. The ability to become educated ... [is] a wonderful gift which sometimes people overlook or misuse.

Within the United States Conference of Catholic Bishops, Pilarczyk became a member of the Committee on Doctrine in 1976 and chairman of the Committee on Education in 1978.

=== Archbishop of Cincinnati ===
Pilarczyk was appointed archbishop of Cincinnati by John Paul II on October 30, 1982. Pilarczyk served as vice president (1986–1989) and president (1989–1992) of the National Conference of Catholic Bishops.

In 2003, Pilarczyk pleaded no contest to five misdemeanor counts of failing to report felonies and admitted facts that constituted guilt; the archdiocese was found guilty of failing to report its crimes, and the judge said that church leaders had placed self-preservation ahead of their moral duty to minister to the victims.In October 2008, Bishop Dennis Marion Schnurr was named by Pope Benedict XVI as Pilarczyk's coadjutor archbishop.

=== Retirement and legacy ===
On August 12, 2009, Pilarczyk resigned as archbishop of Cincinnati on his 75th birthday, as mandated by the Vatican. It was formally accepted by Pope Benedict XVI on December 21, 2009.Pilarczyk continued to be involved in the Greater Cincinnati community. He expressed a fondness for preaching and worked to address what he considered misconceptions regarding Catholicism. In January 2006, his book entitled Being Catholic: How We Believe, Practice, And Think was published. Pilarczyk wrote at least 12 books on the Catholic faith.

After years of declining health, Pilarczyk died in Cincinnati on March 22, 2020. His funeral mass on March 27, 2020 was streamed online from St. Peter in Chains Cathedral. It was closed to the public due to the COVID-19 pandemic.

== See also ==
- Catholic Church hierarchy
- Catholic Church in the United States
- Historical list of the Catholic bishops of the United States
- List of Catholic bishops of the United States
- Lists of patriarchs, archbishops, and bishops

Catholic Church titles
| Preceded by Joseph Bernardin | Archbishop of Cincinnati; 1982-2009 | Succeeded by Dennis Marion Schnurr |
| Preceded by - | Auxiliary Bishop of Cincinnati; 1974-1982 | Succeeded by - |
