= Murder of Margaret Ann Pahl =

2006 murder in Ohio, U.S.

The murder of Sister Margaret Ann Pahl took place on Holy Saturday, April 5, 1980. She was found dead at Mercy Hospital in Toledo, Ohio, where she worked, and had been strangled and stabbed. The Catholic priest Gerald Robinson, who worked at the same hospital, was questioned soon after the crime, but not charged until new evidence emerged in 2003. He was convicted on May 11, 2006, and died in prison in 2014 after several unsuccessful appeals.

== Murder, investigation, and trial ==
In 1980, Robinson was the chaplain at Mercy Hospital, where he ministered to the sick and terminally ill. Sister Margaret Ann was the caretaker of the hospital's chapel.

Robinson (14 April 1938 – 4 July 2014) was convicted of strangling and stabbing Pahl, who was 71 at the time, in the sacristy of a chapel of the hospital where they worked together. The priest presided at her funeral Mass four days after her death. Pahl was stabbed 31 times, including nine times in the shape of an inverted cross. Prosecutors considered this shape to be deliberate and intended to humiliate Pahl in death. Pahl was found covered in an altar cloth, her clothes and body arranged to suggest she had been sexually assaulted, although it was not clear she had been. Specific elements of the murder suggested it was a satanic ritual. A book describing how to perform the satanic black mass was also found in Robinson's possession.

Robinson was questioned about the crime in 1980 but was not charged. The chief of the criminal division in the Lucas County prosecutor's office, Dean Mandros, stated how when detectives were questioning the priest two weeks after the killing, Deputy Police Chief Ray Vetter, who would later testify that he was a practicing Catholic, broke off the interview, against all normal procedures, and allowed a monsignor to escort Father Robinson out of Police Headquarters, which "upset the detectives to no end". Mandros also said Vetter asked detectives to give him their reports on the case, and some of those reports were never seen again. A cover-up was alleged. Whether Robinson was part of a coven, and whether other priests had participated in the murder, may have been part of what was covered up.

The case remained unsolved, with no new leads, until 2003 when police received a letter from a woman who claimed Robinson had sexually abused her when she was a child in a series of Satanic ritual abuse that also involved human sacrifice. The woman, using the name "Survivor Doe", also filed a civil lawsuit against Robinson seeking financial damages for having been a victim of ritual abuse by Robinson and other adults dressed as nuns. The case was dismissed in 2011 owing to having been filed too late.

The accusations were sent to the prosecutor's cold case unit. Forensic tests indicated a sword-shaped letter opener that had been found in Robinson's apartment and stored without detailed examination was consistent with the weapon that inflicted the wounds; in the words of the prosecutor's expert, it could "not be ruled out". The tip of the opener fitted a wound in the jaw of the nun's exhumed body "like a key in a lock" according to prosecutors.

Prosecutors also found three witnesses who said they had seen the priest near the chapel around the time of the killing. The case against Robinson went to trial on April 24, 2006. He was found guilty on all counts on May 11, 2006. This was the second conviction for homicide of a Catholic priest in the United States; Hans Schmidt, executed in 1916, was the first. The third was that of John Feit in 2017 for killing Irene Garza in 1960.

On July 11, 2008, Ohio's Sixth District Court of Appeals reaffirmed his conviction, and in December 2008 the Ohio Supreme Court declined to hear his appeal. In April 2012 he again applied for his conviction to be quashed, but in February 2013 the Ohio 6th District Court of Appeals confirmed the denial of Robinson’s petition for post-conviction relief. Robinson's attorney said the decision would shortly be appealed to the Ohio Supreme Court, and once state appeals were exhausted, the case could move to U.S. District Court.

== Unresolved appeal ==
Before further appeals, Robinson suffered a heart attack in May 2014. He was transferred to the hospice unit of Franklin Medical Center, a prison operated by the Ohio Department of Rehabilitation and Corrections in Columbus, Ohio. Robinson died there on July 4, 2014.

== Popular culture ==
The case is described in the book Sin, Shame, And Secrets: The Murder of a Nun, the Conviction of a Priest, and Cover-up in the Catholic Church by Toledo journalist David Yonke and in the "Alphabet of 'New' Evil" included in The New Evil: Understanding the Emergence of Modern Violent Crime by Dr. Michael H. Stone and Dr. Gary Brucato.

The case was also re-examined in the A&E (TV network) Dead Again, where the original verdict was found to be consistent with the findings – although one investigator did conclude there appeared to be enough uncertainty to not validate a verdict.

Investigation Discovery Network series The Lake Erie Murders devoted the episode "Black Sabbath" to the case.

The case inspired an episode of Law & Order: Criminal Intent, entitled "The Faithful," first broadcast on October 17, 2001.

Also featured in On the Case with Paula Zahn season 5 episode 8, “Last Rites” originally aired January 8, 2012.

The That Chapter Podcast covered the story on April 1, 2024 in "The Black Mass Murder".

== See also ==
- West Memphis 3
