= Holy Trinity Church (Cincinnati, Ohio) =

Coordinates: 39°5′59″N 84°31′25″W

- Holy Trinity Church
- Location: Cincinnati, Ohio, USA
- Denomination: Roman Catholic
- Website: N/A

History
- Founded: 1834
- Dedicated: 1835

Architecture
- Demolished: 1958

Administration
- Diocese: Archdiocese of Cincinnati

Holy Trinity Church (Heilige Dreieinigkeit) was the first German-speaking Roman Catholic church in Cincinnati, Ohio. It was located at the intersection of West Fifth Street and Mound Street in Cincinnati's historic West End. The parish was founded in 1834 and the church was dedicated on October 5, 1834.

The parish school building served as the first home of the minor seminary of the Archdiocese of Cincinnati, Saint Gregory Seminary, when a strike action delayed the construction of its campus in Mount Washington.

John Albrinck, a son of the parish, went on to serve as vicar general of the Archdiocese of Cincinnati, as well as pastor of Holy Trinity and founder of Saint Gregory.

Holy Trinity was founded to serve the growing tide German-speaking Catholic population in Cincinnati. It became the mother church of many German Catholic Churches in Cincinnati. By 1840, 30% of the population was German-speaking, leading to the publication of ordinances in both German and English. Out of the city's 12,000 Catholics, 8,000 were German.

Some of the Cincinnati German parishes were: Old St. Mary's Church (1840), St. John the Baptist Church (1844), St. Philomena (1846), St. Paul Church (Over the Rhine) (1847), St. Michael the Archangel Church (1847), St. Augustine (1852), Immaculata Church (1859), and St. Anthony (1860) and St. Stephen (1867).

Records for this Parish are located at: Chancery Office of the Archdiocese, 100 East Eighth Street, Cincinnati, Ohio 45202

This was the second parish founded in Cincinnati and was closed in 1958. The building was torn down for urban renewal and the construction of Interstate 75. Lost with this church were the Frank Duveneck murals, which were painted on each side of the main altar.
