= St. Michael the Archangel Church (Cincinnati, Ohio) =

- St. Michael the Archangel Church, Cincinnati, OH
- St. Michael the Archangel Church
- 39°06′09″N 84°33′06″W
- Location: Cincinnati, OH
- Country: (United States) USA
- Denomination: Roman Catholic
- Churchmanship: German

History
- Status: Parish Closed
- Founded: April 1, 1847
- Dedicated: June 4, 1848

Architecture
- Closed: April 5, 1998

Administration
- Diocese: Roman Catholic Archdiocese of Cincinnati

St. Michael the Archangel Church is a former Roman Catholic church located at 2110 St. Michael Street, in Cincinnati, Ohio. The cornerstone of this church was laid in 1847 and the church dedicated a year later. The church closed April 5, 1998.

== Parish formation ==
As the tide of German immigrants continued to rise in Cincinnati, more churches were needed. Holy Trinity Church was the first German speaking parish. As the city grew in three directions; north, east and west; there were three parishes which descended from that parish Old St. Mary's Church, St. Philomena's Church and St. Joseph's Church. The three parishes were founded in 1840, 1846 and 1846 respectively. As more immigration followed, St. Michael's was founded, the first filial parish of St. Joseph.

The parish was located in what was then Storrs Township. Forty-five persons organized themselves into a congregation in the early part of 1847 and drew up a constitution for the church

A lot was donated by Innocent Troenle and two additional adjacent pieces of property were bought in April and May 1847. The cornerstone was laid August 1, 1847 and the church dedicated June 4, 1848. Rev. Fr. Zoppoth was selected as the first pastor for the congregation.

== Filial parish and operation by the Combonis ==
In 1868 St. Michael Church became the mother parish to St. Lawrence Church which was organized that same year. The Comboni Missionaries took charge of the parish in 1964. By this time many of the German-speaking families in the parish had begun to move to other parts of the city.

== Gallery ==
Nave and altar of St. Michael the Archangel Church

Pipe Organ at St. Michael the Archangel Church

Baptismal Font at St. Michael the Archangel Church

Tabernacle at St. Michael the Archangel Church

Mural of the Patron Saint of St. Michael the Archangel Church

Mural of the Last Supper of St. Michael the Archangel Church

== Parish closing ==
In a mass celebrated by Daniel Edward Pilarczyk the church building was used for the final time to celebrate the Eucharist on April 5, 1998. The parish closed. The last pastor was Rev. Fr. Mark Burger.

== Building and church today ==
The Hook and Hastings pipe organ was removed and installed at West Chester's St. John the Evangelist Catholic Church in September 1999 and dedicated on October 17, 1999. The sanctuary stands in the Lower Price Hill neighborhood. The entire complex is owned by Education Matters, a non-profit education and community organization. Education Matters has owned the campus since 2008 and is currently renovating all five buildings with New Market and Historic Tax Credits. The former St. Michael's sanctuary, is now known as The Sanctuary and will be a community and event center. The former rectory and annexes will house a range of organizations, artists, and office spaces operated by Community Matters.
