= Heinrich Hoffmann =

Heinrich Hoffmann or Hoffman may refer to:

== Hoffmann ==
- Heinrich Hoffmann (photographer) (1885–1957), German photographer
- Heinrich Hoffmann (author) (1809–1894), German psychiatrist and author
- Heinrich Hoffmann (sport shooter) (1869–1932), German Olympic shooter
- Heinrich Hoffmann (pilot) (1913–1941), World War II German flying ace

== Hoffman ==
Anglicized form

- Heinrich Hoffman (1836–1894), American Civil War veteran

== See also ==
- Heinrich Hofmann (disambiguation)
