= New St. Joseph Cemetery =

Catholic cemetery Cincinnati, Hamilton County, Ohio

Coordinates: 39°6′27″N 84°36′1″W

- Interactive map of New St. Joseph Cemetery

Details
- Established: 1843/1853
- Location: Cincinnati, Ohio
- Country: US
- Type: Private, Roman Catholic
- Owned by: St. Joseph New Cemetery Association
- Size: 163 acres (0.66 km^{2})
- Website: www.stjoenew.com
- Find a Grave: New St. Joseph Cemetery

New St. Joseph Cemetery is a Catholic cemetery located at West Eighth Street and Nebraska Avenue in Cincinnati, Ohio in the Price Hill neighborhood. The original Old St. Joseph's Cemetery was founded at West Eight Street & Enright Avenue, in 1843 by Rev. John Baptist Purcell, for English speaking Catholics. The new cemetery was created in 1853 following the cholera outbreak which began in 1849, as the Irish section of St. Joseph Cemetery had reached its capacity, the new cemetery was located two miles (3 km) west. The Old St. Joseph's Cemetery was used mostly by German Catholics.

Originally New St. Joseph's land plot was sixty-one acres, but today the cemetery grounds encompass one-hundred and sixty-three acres, which was once part of the Terry family farm. The grounds are maintained by the St. Joseph Cemetery Association.

The 29 graves of Delphi Universalist Church Cemetery is located on a half acre lot within the bounds of St. Joseph's.

== List of notable inurnments ==
- Walter Connolly (1887–1940) – American character actor
- William Henry Elder (1819–1904) – Roman Catholic Bishop of Cincinnati
- Henry K. Moeller (1849–1925) – Roman Catholic Bishop of Cincinnati
- Robert J. O'Brien (1858-1949) – Cincinnati resident, philanthropist, and politician
