= John Albrinck =

German-American Catholic Priest of Cincinnati, Ohio

The Very Reverend Father John Albrinck Ph.D.
- Vicar General of the Archdiocese of Cincinnati
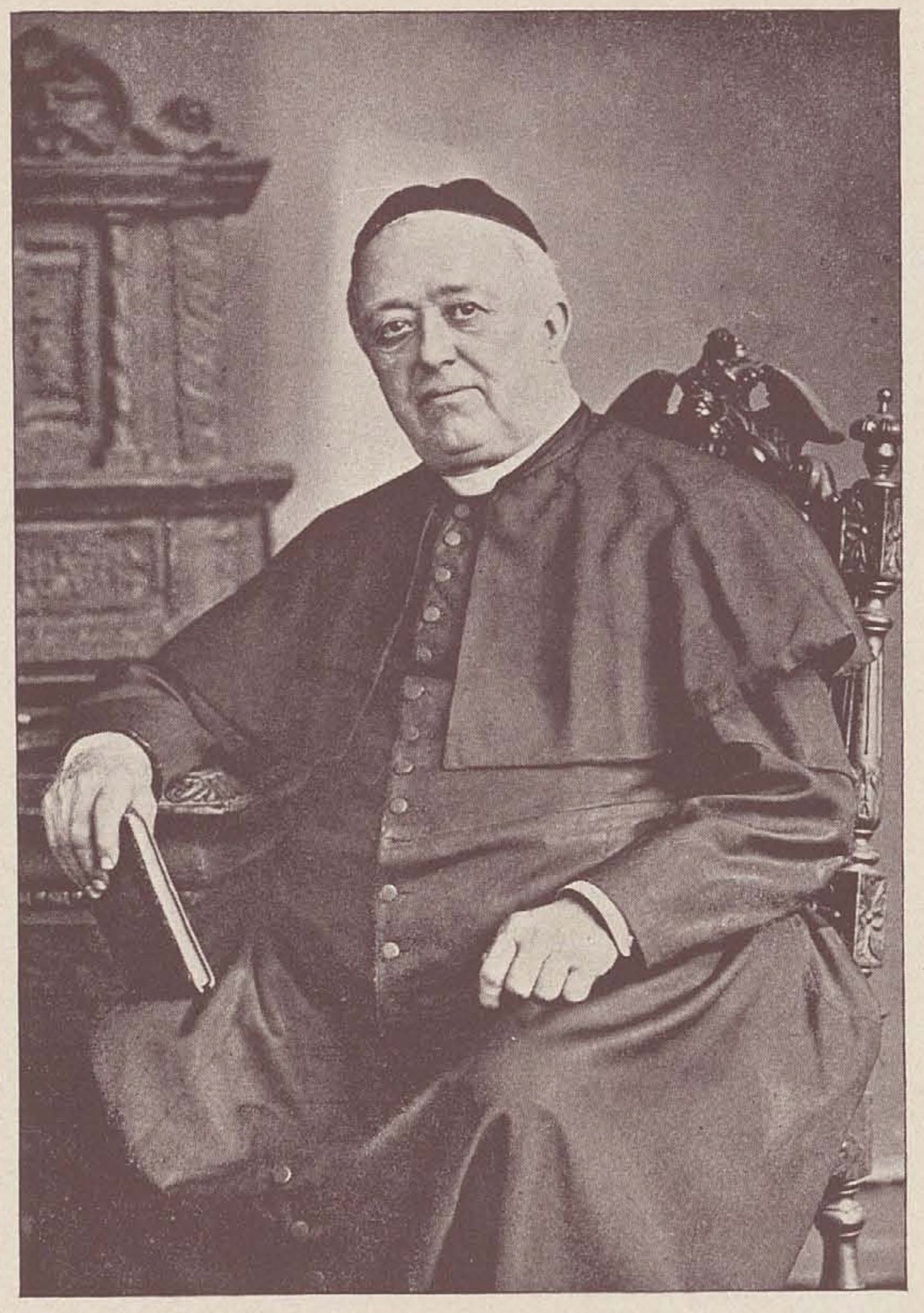
- Church: Catholic
- Archdiocese: Cincinnati
- Other posts: Rector, Saint Gregory Seminary Pastor, Holy Trinity Church Pastor, Sacred Heart Church

Orders
- Ordination: May 21, 1853

Personal details
- Born: January 17, 1830 Hunteburg, Hanover, Germany
- Died: February 18, 1902 (aged 72) Holy Trinity Church, Cincinnati, Ohio
- Buried: Old St. Joseph's Cemetery, Cincinnati
- Education: College of St. Xavier; Saint-Sulpice Seminary

John Christopher Albrinck (January 17, 1830, to February 18, 1902) was a German-American Catholic prelate of the Archdiocese of Cincinnati who served as vicar general of the archdiocese from 1885 to his death and also as the first rector and co-founder of the archdiocesan minor seminary, serving as both a high school and college—Saint Gregory, in Mount Washington, Cincinnati.

== Biography ==
=== Early life ===
Albrinck was born in Hunteburg, Hanover, in Germany and immigrated to Cincinnati when he was six years old. He attended Holy Trinity Church in the West End, receiving his first communion and confirmation there, as well as attending the parish school. He then attended St. Xavier College, and upon graduating in 1849 went to Saint-Sulpice Seminary in France to pursue priestly studies. He was ordained in Notre-Dame de Paris on May 21, 1853, and returned to Cincinnati soon after.

=== Priesthood ===
==== Parish ministry ====
Following a brief sabbatical, Albrinck was made pastor of Sacred Heart Church in Pomeroy, Ohio, as well as adjacent territory in Meigs, Athens, and Gallia counties in January 1854, also founding St. Louis Church in Gallipolis. In 1859, he was moved to Reading, Ohio and served as pastor there as well as chaplain to the Sisters of Notre Dame de Namur based in that city. During this time he also founded St. Charles church at Carthage, and St. Gabriel church at Glendale. In 1872 he was made pastor of the parish in which he grew up, Holy Trinity. During the financial crisis that affected the Archdiocese of Cincinnati in 1878, Albrinck was part of a committee of select clergy who assembled a plan to keep the archdiocese solvent.

Following the death of the vicar-general for German-speakers in the archdiocese in 1885, William Elder promoted Albrinck to that position the same year. Upon the death of the vicar-general for English speakers the following year, Albrinck also assumed that position, marking the end of separate administration based on language groups in the archdiocese.

==== Founder and rector of Saint Gregory ====
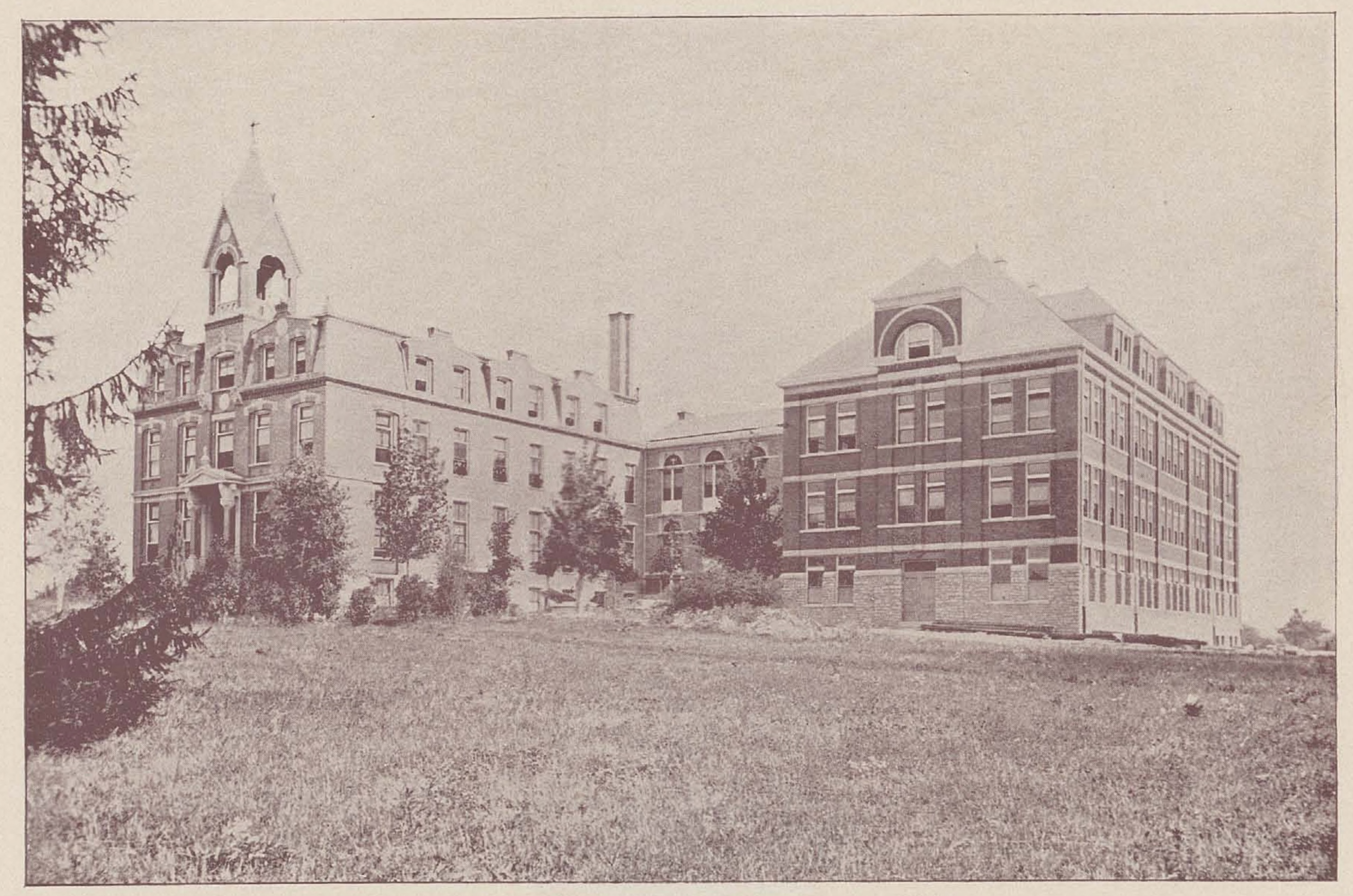
Albrinck oversaw the construction of the original Saint Gregory Seminary building, pictured here.

From 1873, Albrinck became one of the major advocates for the establishment of a minor seminary to serve the Catholics of Cincinnati. With the decrees of the Third Council of Baltimore encouraging the separation of preparatory minor seminaries from major theological seminaries, Archbishop Elder granted Albrinck $5,265 to purchase land in what is now Mount Washington, Cincinnati and begin building Saint Gregory Seminary. Albrinck served as rector from 1890 to 1892, overseeing the first class studying at Holy Trinity school when construction on the Mt. Washington property was delayed by a strike. Many of the fruit trees which used to populate the grounds of St. Gregory were planted by Albrinck, with estimates stating he planted over 1,500 trees during his two years as rector. In the fall of 1891, the main building at St. Gregory was complete and the following year Albrinck returned to Holy Trinity, passing leadership of St. Gregory to Henry Brinkmeyer.

In February 1902, Albrinck fell ill with pneumonia and died on February 18. His funeral was at Holy Trinity Church on February 28, 1902. Thousands viewed his remains before they were interred at Old St. Joseph's Cemetery in Cincinnati.
