= Sacred Heart Church (Pomeroy, Ohio) =

Catholic parish church in Pomeroy, Ohio, US

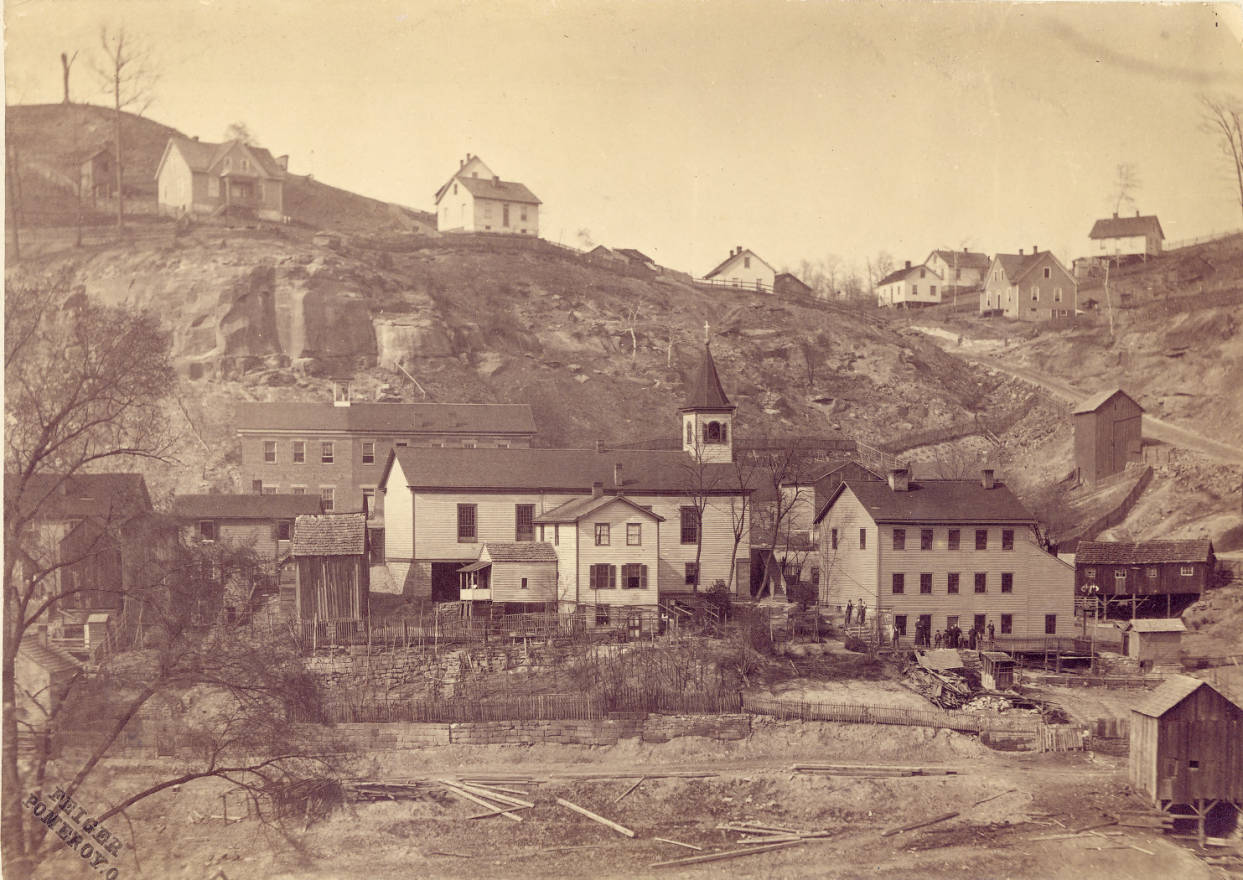
- Sacred Heart as seen in an 1875 photograph.
- Sacred Heart Church
- 39°01′45″N 82°02′12″W
- Address: 161 Mulberry Avenue; Pomeroy, Ohio, US
- Denomination: Catholic
- Website: https://athenscatholic.org/sacred-heart-1

History
- Founded: 1849
- Dedicated: November 5, 1899

Architecture
- Architect: Fred Heer
- Style: Gothic
- Construction cost: $42,000

Specifications
- Height: 157 feet

Administration
- Diocese: Steubenville

Sacred Heart Church is a Catholic parish church of the Diocese of Steubenville located in Pomeroy, Ohio, United States. The congregation was founded in 1849 and the current Gothic sandstone church constructed in 1899. It is the birthplace of the orphanage which eventually became the Pontifical College Josephinum, one of two pontifical colleges in the United States.

== History ==
=== Founding ===
In 1837, four German Catholic families arrived in Pomeroy to work in the coal mines there. Their sacramental needs were administered to by a priest from Marietta, who only spoke English while the miners and their families only spoke German. In 1845, an advertisement encouraging Catholics to come and settle in the area was posted in the Catholic Telegraph of Cincinnati. By 1848 the population had grown such that both a resident priest and a dedicated church building became more of a priority. That same year, 46 people came together to plan the building of a dedicated church.

In 1849, Fr. Theophile Kraft arrived as the first resident pastor and oversaw the construction of the first wooden church on the site, built from trees cut nearby on Lincoln Hill and dragged to the parish site on Mulberry Avenue, just west of the current building. This building served the parish for fifty years.

=== School ===
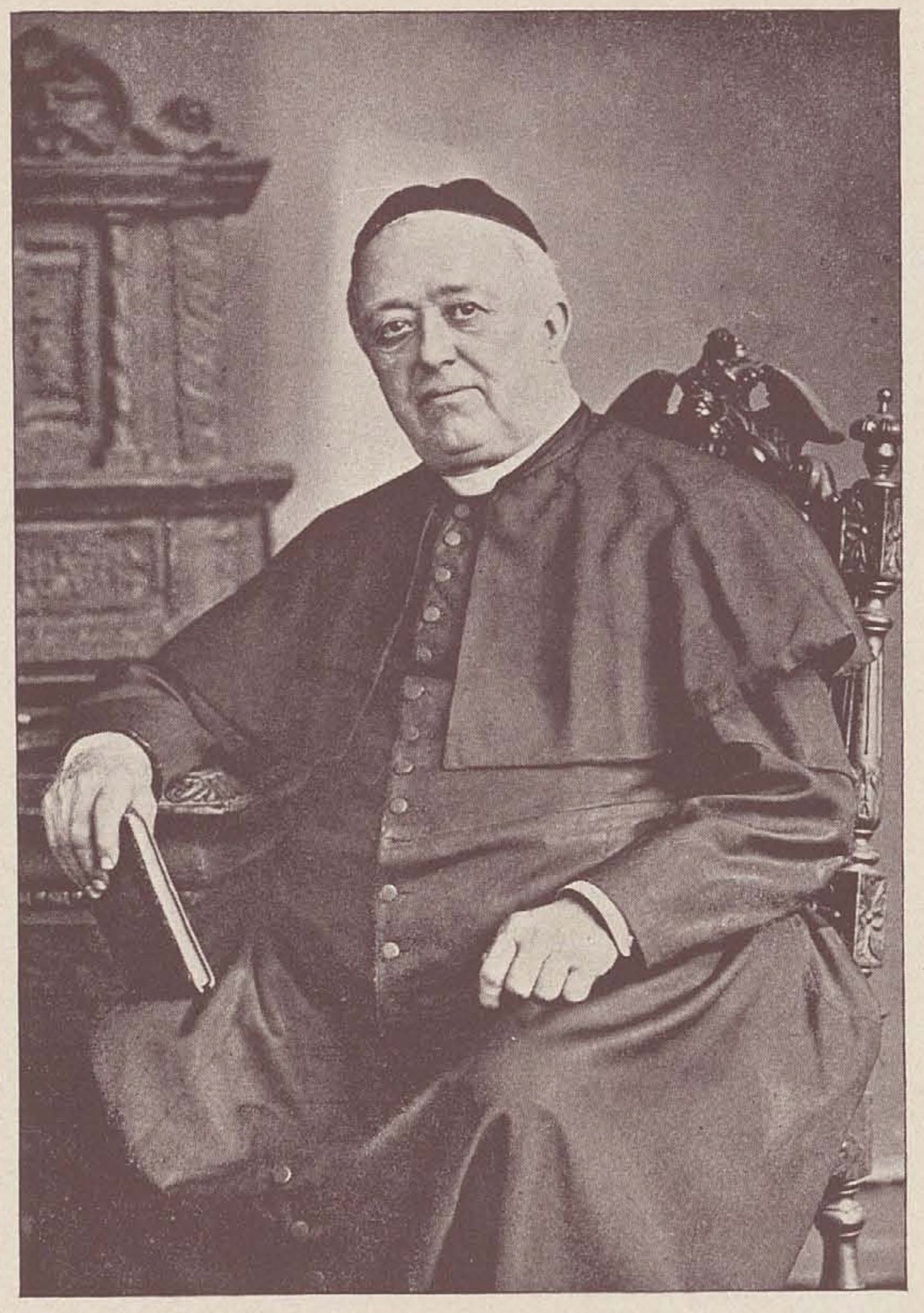
Fr. John Albrinck was pastor of Sacred Heart from 1854 to 1858 and again from 1863 to 1864.

By 1862, under the pastorate of Fr. Tappert, the population had grown enough to support a school, which initially operated out of the basement of the church. Children crossed over the then-unpaved streets of Pomeroy and Middleport to receive an education there, often at great effort. Fr. Tappert was replaced by Fr. John Albrinck in 1864, by which point attendees at Mass at the frame church came from Middleport, Syracuse, and Mason, West Virginia. Albinck would later go on to found Saint Gregory Seminary in the archdiocese of Cincinnati in 1890. A new brick schoolhouse was built in 1866 serving 200 children in the care of four Sisters of Charity. In 1868, Miegs County and Pomeroy came under the administration of the newly-formed Diocese of Columbus then led by Sylvester Horton Rosecrans. Previously the church was administered by the Archdiocese of Cincinnati.

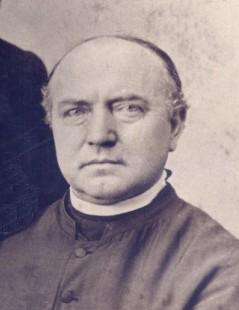
Father Joseph Jessing served in Pomeroy from 1870 to 1876.

=== Jessing and St. Joseph Orphanage ===
In 1870, Joseph Jessing became the pastor of Sacred Heart only three years after arriving in the United States from Germany. Seeing the hardships experienced by the orphaned children in the community, he established St. Joseph's Orphanage and a German-language newspaper, the Ohio Waisenfreund or “Ohio Orphan’s Friend", the latter as a means of publicizing the work of the orphanage. By 1876, this work had grown such that it was necessary to place the parish work in charge of Father N.N. Kempen so Jessing could continue his work with the orphans. This growth continued such that a larger city with easier railroad access would serve the orphanage and its paper was needed, and so Jessing moved his operations to Ohio in 1877, where they would become the Pontifical College Josephinum (one of two pontifical colleges in the United States).

=== Construction of current church ===
By 1897 the community realized a new church was needed and resolved to begin building following a meeting in April of that year. The old orphanage site, the building of which had been removed after Jessing's departure, was chosen and in the spring of 1898 construction began, with the cornerstone being laid by Bishop John Watterson of Columbus on May 22, 1898. The plans for the building were drawn by Fred Heer of Dubuque, Iowa and the completed structure, made of local sandstone, was consecrated by Francis Specht, diocesan administrator of Columbus on November 5, 1899. The entire cost for the church was $42,000.

Due to the declining population in the area, the parochial school closed in 1904 but was re-established in 1908 under a lay teacher. By 1914, the school was made free under the leadership of Fr. Cornelius Schneider, a notable teetotaler.

In 1923, Fr. Theodore Igel, a native son of the parish and one of the first seminarians to enter the Josephinum, became pastor of Sacred Heart in January of that year. He died due to a tumor four years later and is buried in the parish cemetery.

=== Diocese of Steubenville ===
In 1944, Pomeroy was again transferred to a new diocese, the Diocese of Steubenville. By the mid-1950s, the school was in danger of being closed again due to declining enrollment and was permanently closed in 1958. Since 2016, the parish has shared a pastor with nearby Athens County.
