= Heinrich Hofmann =

Heinrich Hofmann may refer to:

- August Heinrich Hoffmann von Fallersleben (1798-1874), German poet
- Heinrich Hoffmann (author) (1809–1894), German psychiatrist and writer
- Heinrich Hofmann (painter) (1824–1911), German painter
- Heinrich Hofmann (composer) (1842–1902), German composer and pianist
- Heinrich Hoffmann (sport shooter) (b. 1869), German sport shooter
- Heinrich Hoffmann (photographer) (1885–1957), personal photographer of Adolf Hitler
- Heinrich Hoffman (b. 1869), soldier in the American Civil War

== See also ==
- Heinrich Hoffmann (disambiguation)
