= Robert J. O'Brien =

American politician (1858–1948)

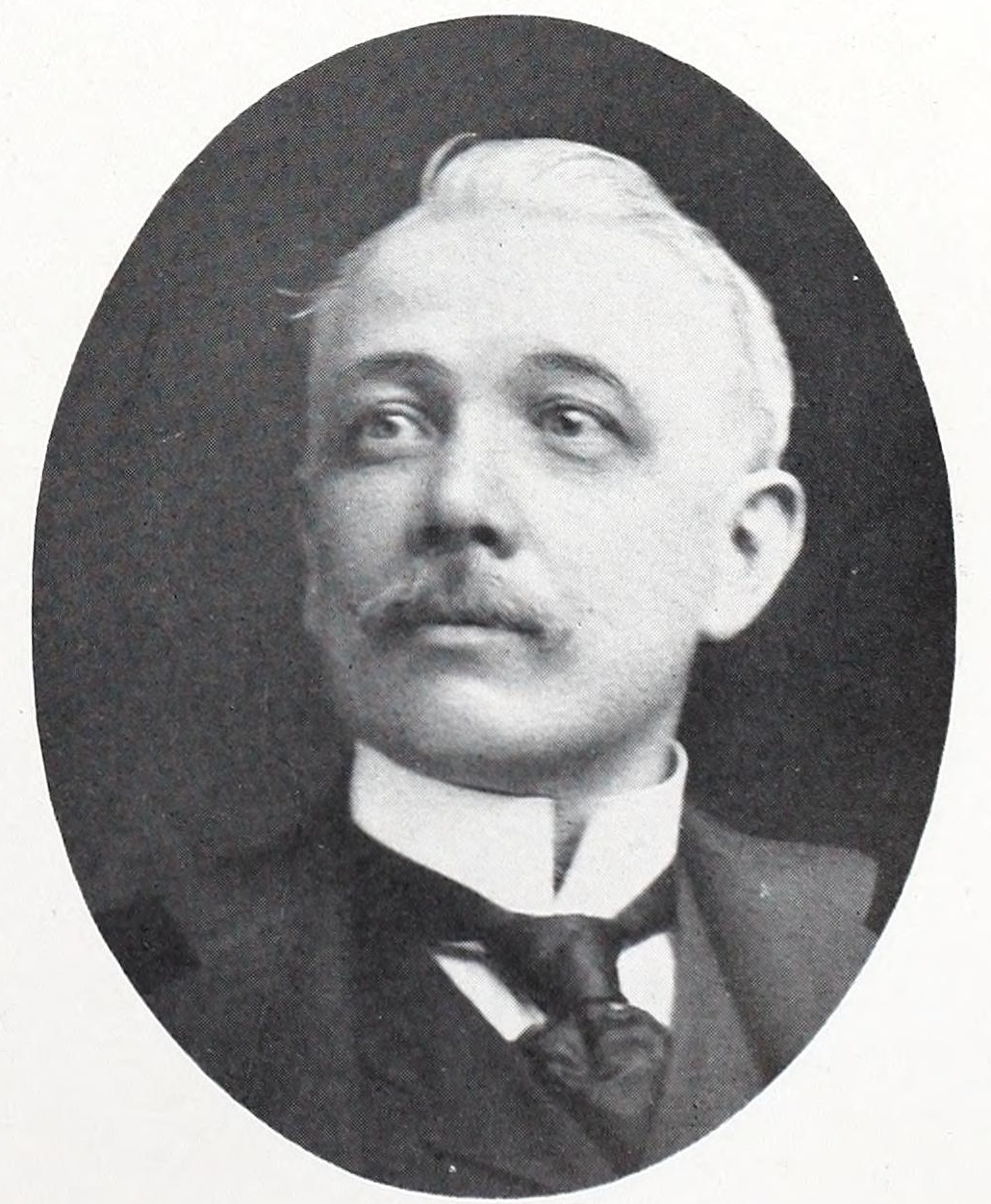
- Born: June 5, 1858; New York City, US
- Died: May 9, 1948 (aged 89); Cincinnati, Ohio, US
- Burial place: New St. Joseph Cemetery, Cincinnati, Ohio, US
- Education: Manhattan College
- Occupations: City alderman for Cincinnati; Ohio State Senator; Real estate developer Philanthropist

Robert J. O'Brien (June 5, 1858 – May 9, 1948) was an American real estate developer, politician, and philanthropist. He served on the Cincinnati City Council and in the Ohio Senate.

== Biography ==
=== Early life ===
Robert J. O'Brien was born in New York City on June 5, 1858, to Robert O'Brien and Mary Dwyer, who had emigrated to the United States from Ireland six years earlier. O'Brien attended Manhattan College and then served as a law clerk to George P. Wetmore from 1873 to 1877.

=== Career ===
In 1880, O'Brien moved to Cincinnati, Ohio to open a hotel, eventually owning several, in addition to residential dwellings, cafes, and saloons. This is despite the fact that O'Brien stated he did not drink alcohol. By 1888, he became active in local politics, running for alderman as a Democrat.

By 1902, he was councilman for the Sixth Ward of Cincinnati, a position he would be re-elected to six times, twice without opposition. This territory had over 250 saloons within it. He was an advocate for a unified intercity railroad terminal for the city of Cincinnati, as the city had five different stations at the time, all prone to flooding. He also recommended the acquisition of the Cincinnati Zoo by the city government during a time of financial trouble for the zoo.

In 1916, O'Brien won a seat in the Ohio Senate as a Republican representing Hamilton County, promising to "go up to Columbus to work for Cincinnati". He was re-elected in 1918, and retired from politics in 1920. Prohibition forced the closure of his saloon businesses, allowing O'Brien to travel the world in his retirement.

O'Brien was a major donor to many Cincinnati religious institutions, including to Good Samaritan Hospital and Saint Gregory Seminary. He also was a spokesman for the well-beings of orphans in the city of Cincinnati, advocating for the reform of orphanage conditions and establishing a fund for the use of orphanages in Hamilton County.

=== Death ===
Robert J. O'Brien died on May 9, 1948, at the age of 89, at Good Samaritan Hospital. His requiem mass was said at St. Francis Xavier Church, and he was buried in his private mausoleum at New St. Joseph Cemetery.
