= St. Paul Church (Over the Rhine) =

- St. Paul Church Historic District
- U.S. National Register of Historic Places
- U.S. Historic district
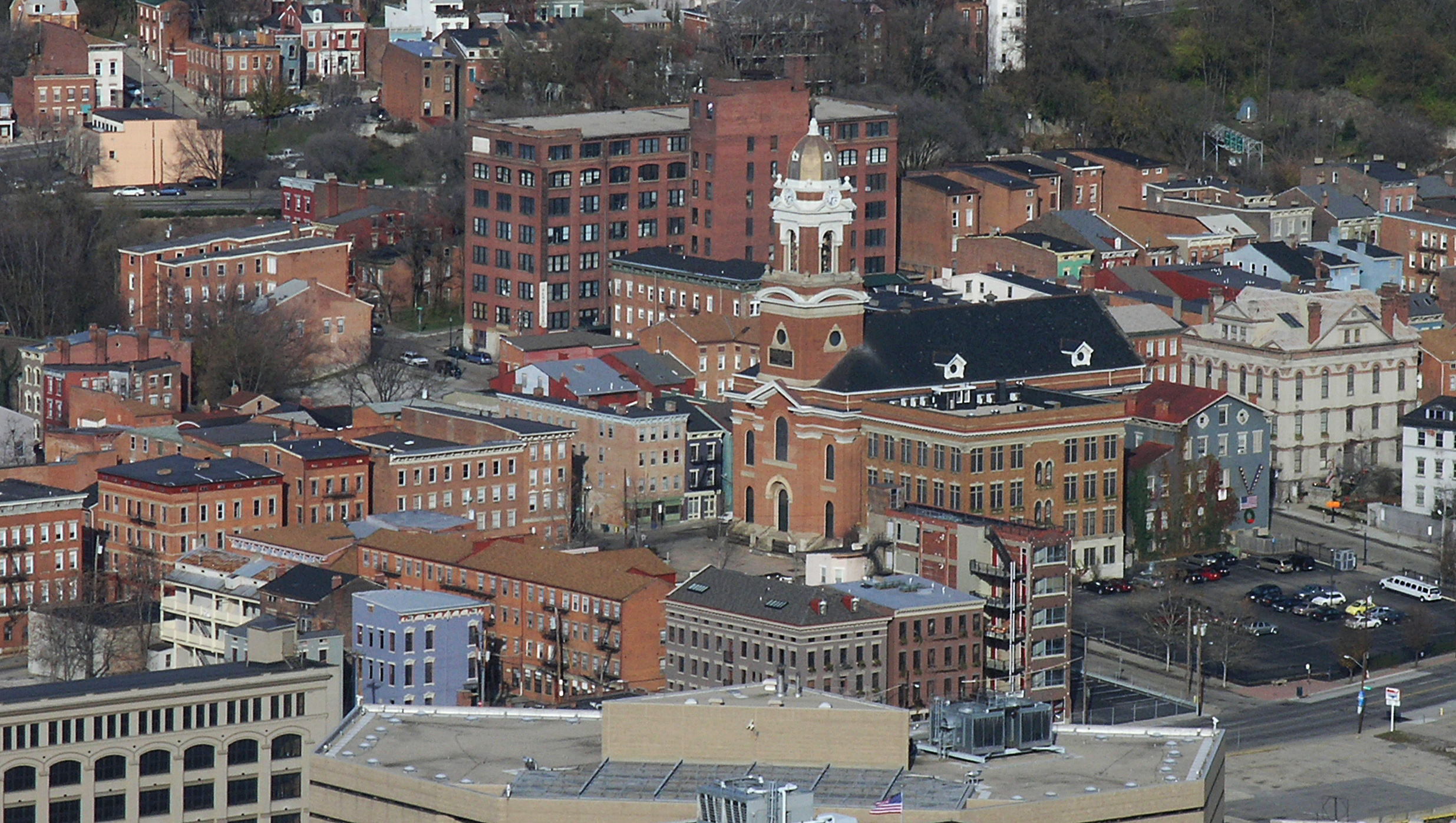
- View from the Carew Tower

- Location within Ohio Location within the United States
- Location: Spring, 12th and Pendleton Sts., Cincinnati, Ohio
- Coordinates: 39°6′35″N 84°30′26″W
- Area: 1.8 acres (0.73 ha)
- Built: 1848
- Architectural style: Romanesque Revival
- NRHP reference No.: 74001513
- Added to NRHP: January 18, 1974

St. Paul Church is a former Roman Catholic church located on the southeastern corner of Twelfth and Spring Streets in Cincinnati, Ohio, United States, in the city's Pendleton neighborhood.

St. Paul's Cathedral, Cincinnati

The German-speaking parish was formed in the winter of 1847–1848 to serve the members of St. Mary's Church who lived east of Clay Street. Under the leadership of Vicar-General Joseph Ferneding, the members bought the present site and surrounding properties in February 1848; their design was finalized four months later, and construction was financed by the sale of the land now comprising the surrounding neighborhood. Construction was finished in 1850; the completed building measures 150 by 68 feet (46 m × 21 m) and stands 48 feet (15 m) tall with a tin-covered gabled roof; the building is built of brick on a stone foundation. A fire in 1899 destroyed all but the church walls and German-made stained glass windows, but reconstruction began at once, and the new St. Paul's was dedicated on October 7, 1900. Light fills the interior and the proscenium is supported by twelve Corinthian columns. This brick Romanesque structure has broad Doric pilasters set in its corners and between its tall, round arched windows. It has a Renaissance tower capped with a Pope's Mitre cupola roof and gilded cross. The three arched doorways face Spring Street.

Deconsecrated in 1974, the church complex was named to the National Register of Historic Places in the same year; the buildings compose a historic district, the "St. Paul Church Historic District". In 1981, The Verdin Company, a bell and clock company, purchased the church, convent, schools, and rectory. The buildings were restored and the church was transformed into a bell and clock museum/showroom. The other buildings were transformed into art galleries. The records for this parish are located at Old St. Mary's Church.

In 1983, the Ohio Historical Society gave the Verdin Company an award for its use of the church building, praising their restoration and adaptive reuse of the church.

Today, the church is owned by Cafeo Hospitality. It is now a venue for weddings and corporate events.
