= Old St. Joseph's Cemetery =

Cemetery in Cincinnati, Ohio, USA

- Interactive map of Old St. Joseph's Cemetery

Details
- Established: 1843
- Location: Cincinnati, Ohio
- Country: United States
- Coordinates: 39°6′12″N 84°34′40″W
- Type: Private, Roman Catholic
- Owned by: Roman Catholic Archdiocese of Cincinnati / Cincinnati Catholic Cemetery Society
- Size: 200 acres (0.81 km^{2})
- No. of interments: >20,000
- Website: Cincinnati Catholic Cemetery Society
- Find a Grave: Old St. Joseph's Cemetery

Gravemarker inscribed in German in the old section

The Old St. Joseph's Cemetery is a cemetery in Cincinnati.

== History ==
Old St. Joseph's Cemetery was founded at West Eight Street & Enright Avenue, in 1843 by Reverend John Baptist Purcell. The cemetery received its first burials the same year, and there have been over 85,000 interments since.

== Notable interments ==
- Larry Benton (1897–1953), football player
- Moe Burtschy (1922–2004), baseball player
- Heinrich Hoffman (1836–1894), Civil War veteran and recipient of the Medal of Honor
- Stephen Joseph McGroarty (1830–1870), Civil War general
- Clyde Vollmer (1921–2006), baseball player
- John Albrinck (1830-1902), founder of Saint Gregory Seminary and Vicar general of the Archdiocese of Cincinnati
