= Larry Benton =

American baseball player (1897–1953)

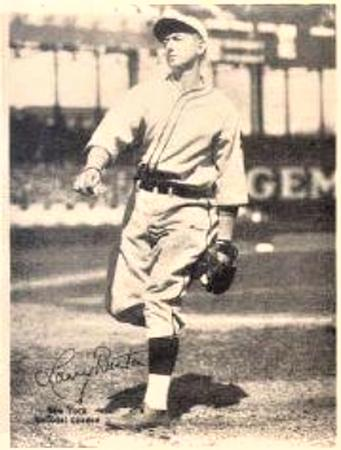
- Pitcher
- Born: November 20, 1897; St. Louis, Missouri, U.S.
- Died: April 3, 1953 (aged 55); Amberley, Ohio, U.S.
- Batted: Right Threw: Right

MLB debut
- April 19, 1923, for the Boston Braves

Last MLB appearance
- August 16, 1935, for the Boston Braves

MLB statistics
- Win–loss record: 128–128
- Earned run average: 4.03
- Strikeouts: 670
- Stats at Baseball Reference

Teams
- Boston Braves (1923–1927); New York Giants (1928–1930); Cincinnati Reds (1930–1934); Boston Braves (1935)

Career highlights and awards
- NL wins leader (1928)

Lawrence James Benton (November 20, 1897 – April 3, 1953) was an American right-handed pitcher in Major League Baseball who played for the Boston Braves, New York Giants and Cincinnati Reds over parts of thirteen seasons from 1923 to 1935. He was the National League wins leader while pitching for the Giants in 1928, compiling a 128–128 career record with a 4.03 ERA and 670 strikeouts in 455 appearances.

Benton is buried at Old St. Joseph's Cemetery in Cincinnati.

== See also ==
- List of Major League Baseball annual wins leaders
