= Saint Gregory Seminary =

Former Catholic seminary in Ohio, US

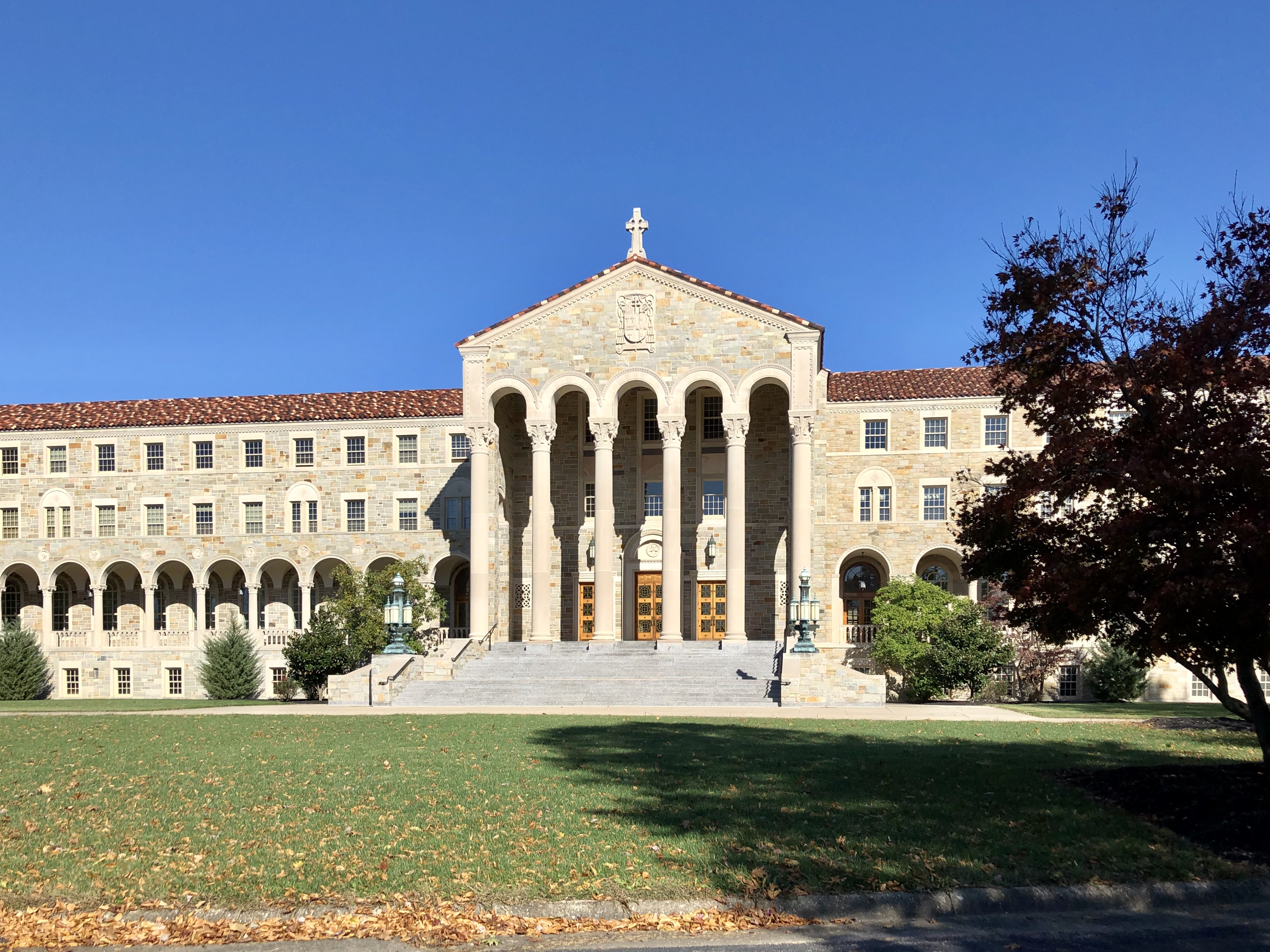
- Other name: Mount Saint Gregory
- Motto: Proficere sapientia aetate et gratia
- Motto in English: To advance in wisdom, age and grace
- Type: Catholic seminary; Minor seminary; Private university
- Active: 1890–1980
- Founders: William Henry Elder, John Albrinck, Bernard Engbers
- Parent institution: Archdiocese of Cincinnati
- Religious affiliation: Catholic Church
- Location: 6616 Beechmont Avenue, Mount Washington, Cincinnati, Ohio, 45230, United States; 39°04′59″N 84°22′18″W
- Campus: Suburban

Saint Gregory Seminary, also known as Mount Saint Gregory, was a high school and college seminary of the Catholic Church in Mount Washington, Cincinnati, serving the Archdiocese of Cincinnati in Ohio. Founded in 1890 by bishop William Elder along with John Albrinck and Bernard Engbers, it was closed from 1907 to 1923 due to financial difficulties. It reopened in 1923, and was permanently closed in 1980 due to declining enrollment. Over 1100 students graduated from Saint Gregory during its 70 years of operation.

The Lombard-Romanesque campus became the site of Mount Saint Mary Seminary of the West on two occasions: From 1904 to 1923, and from 1980 to the present.

== History ==
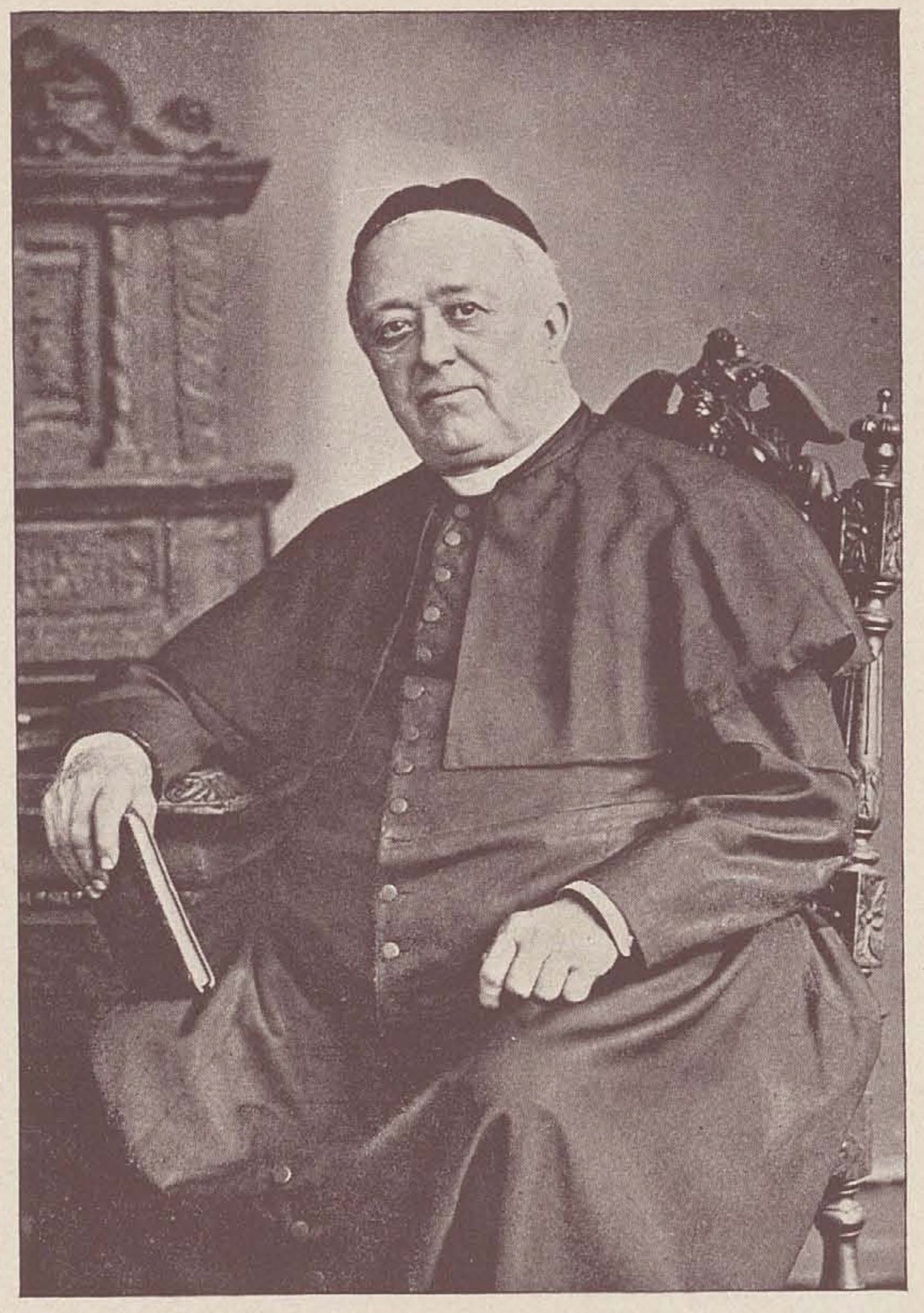
Fr. John Albrinck, the first rector of Saint Gregory

=== Background ===
Prior to the establishment of St. Gregory, high-school and undergraduate-aged men discerning a vocation to the priesthood studied at the various campuses of the major seminary of the Archdiocese of Cincinnati, Mount Saint Mary of the West. Following the statements of the Third Council of Baltimore that independent, separate preparatory seminaries were preferred, as well as the reopening of Mt. St. Mary's following the diocesan financial crisis, discussion of the creation of a dedicated preparatory seminary resumed.

In 1887, William Henry Elder decided to pursue the creation of a minor seminary. Two years later, Elder gave permission to John Albrinck, Bernard Engbers, and a number of other priests of the Archdiocese who had been advocating for a minor seminary since 1873 to begin the formation of what would become St. Gregory. The institution was named for its patron, Pope Gregory the Great.

=== Mount Washington campus ===
In the summer of 1890, a 57-acre plot of land in Mount Washington was purchased by Albrinck under the instruction of Elder for $5,625 and construction on a building immediately begun, with hopes of classes being held in the structure in the fall. A strike action by construction tradesmen in Cincinnati caused the building to be competed nearly a year later, in 1891. In the meantime, classes were held at the parish school building of Holy Trinity Church under the leadership of the institution's first rector, John Albrinck.

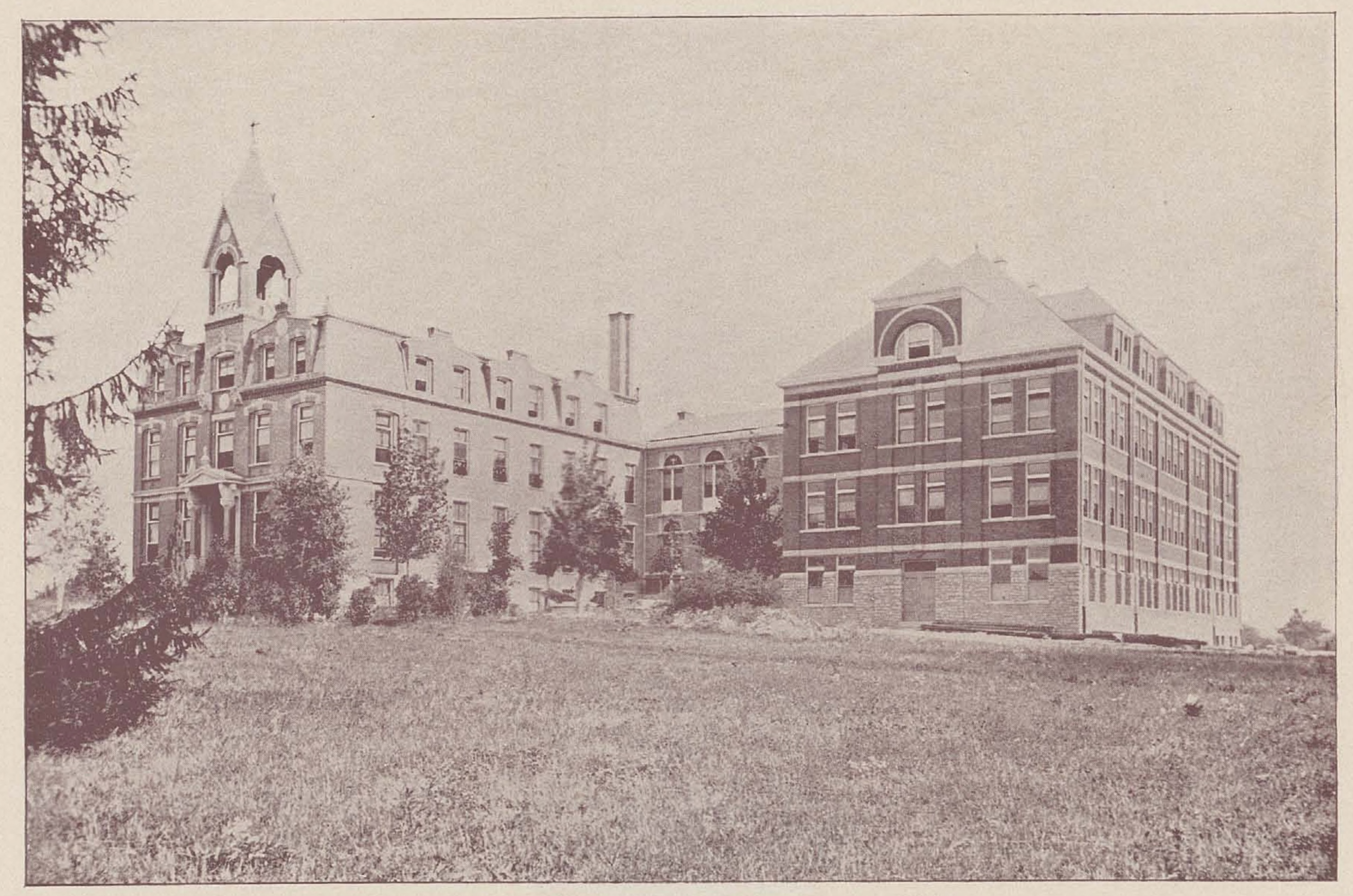
The St. Gregory campus circa 1896.

By the fall of 1891, the brick building constructed under the supervision of Louis Picket was completed and ready for students. It was dedicated and hosted its first day of classes on September 8, 1891, with an enrollment of 28 students. Increasing enrollment required the expansion of the building, with the building of a north wing in 1892, a gymnasium in 1893, and a south wing housing dormitories, a study hall, laboratory space, and a chapel in 1895.

In early 1904, due to the cost of maintaining two separate seminary campuses straining already-stressed diocesan finances, the Mt. St. Mary complex in Price Hill was sold to the Sisters of the Good Shepherd for an orphanage, and plans to add on to the St. Gregory site to house the graduate-level students were made. This plan was altered into the existing Mt. Washington campus housing the major seminary of Mt. St. Marys, with the St. Gregory preparatory program being made a day school at another site following a survey of the priests of the archdiocese. This was despite the formal written opposition of the faculty of St. Gregory.

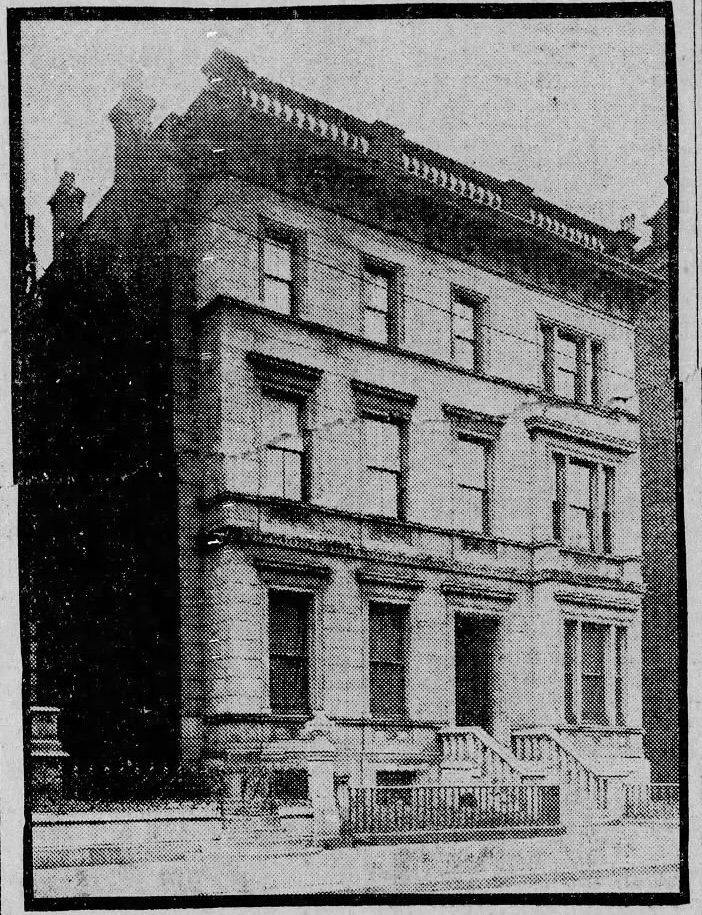
Formerly the Perin homestead, this building in downtown Cincinnati housed St. Gregory from 1904 to 1907.

=== Downtown campus and temporary closure ===
In June 1904, a three-year lease was signed for St. Gregory to use the buildings of the Perin homestead in downtown Cincinnati, located at 220 West Seventh Street — within a block of the Cathedral of St. Peter in Chains. This transition allowed students to live with their families, or with host families in the city if students came from a significant distance to attend classes, which in turn drastically decreased tuition costs.

Due to the time limit placed by the three-year agreement for use of the property, by 1906 there was much speculation as to the fate of the preparatory program. While plans were made to construct a new college building at the recently acquired diocesan property in Norwood once sufficient money was available, the lease of the Perin property expired and the seminary was closed on June 27, 1907. Also contributing to the closure was low enrollment due parents being hesitant to entrust their boys to host families. However, this closure was not meant to be permanent. In the meantime, archbishop Henry Moeller instructed young men who were interested in preparing for major seminary to attend either Xavier University or the University of Dayton, being against the idea of merging the institution for preparatory seminarians with that for students of graduate-level theology.

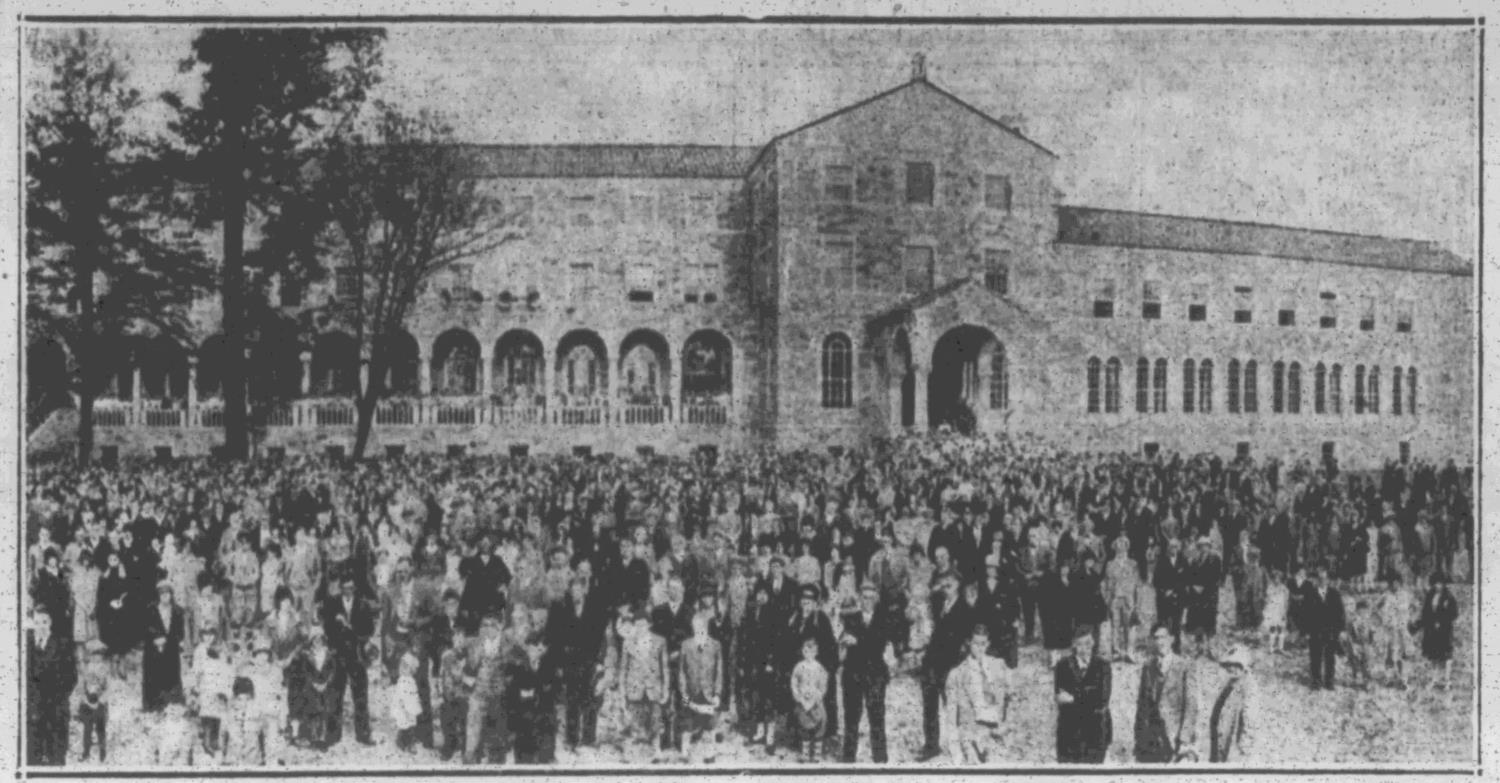
A crowd of spectators at the dedication of the new wing of Saint Gregory in October 1929.

=== Reopening and expansion at Mount Washington ===
Following the relocation of the major seminary program to the new Norwood campus in 1923, the preparatory program of St. Gregory was revived and took over the Mt. Washington site that had been purchased for it over four decades earlier. On September 17, 1923, the institution resumed classes with 82 students in philosophical classes and 18 in the classical course. This was despite objections from clergy of Cincinnati, who were expecting the minor seminary to move to the more urban, less spacious Norwood campus.

In 1926, discussion began concerning a new building on the campus, due in large part to the inadequacy and unsafe condition of the existing high school facilities. 17 additional acres of land adjoining the southern portion of the property were purchased and construction began in November 1927. The new building, the oldest portion of the existing structure, contained both faculty and student housing, classrooms, an infirmary, gymnasium, as well as a convent wing for the Sisters of the Precious Blood who took care of domestic work for the seminary. Construction on the Lombard-style granite high school wing was performed by Joseph Neyer, the first stage of a building that was planned to have a matching wing for the college department, joined in the middle by a chapel. The new wing, costing over $1,000,000 was dedicated by Archbishop John McNicholas on October 6, 1929, with a crowd of 10,000 spectators.

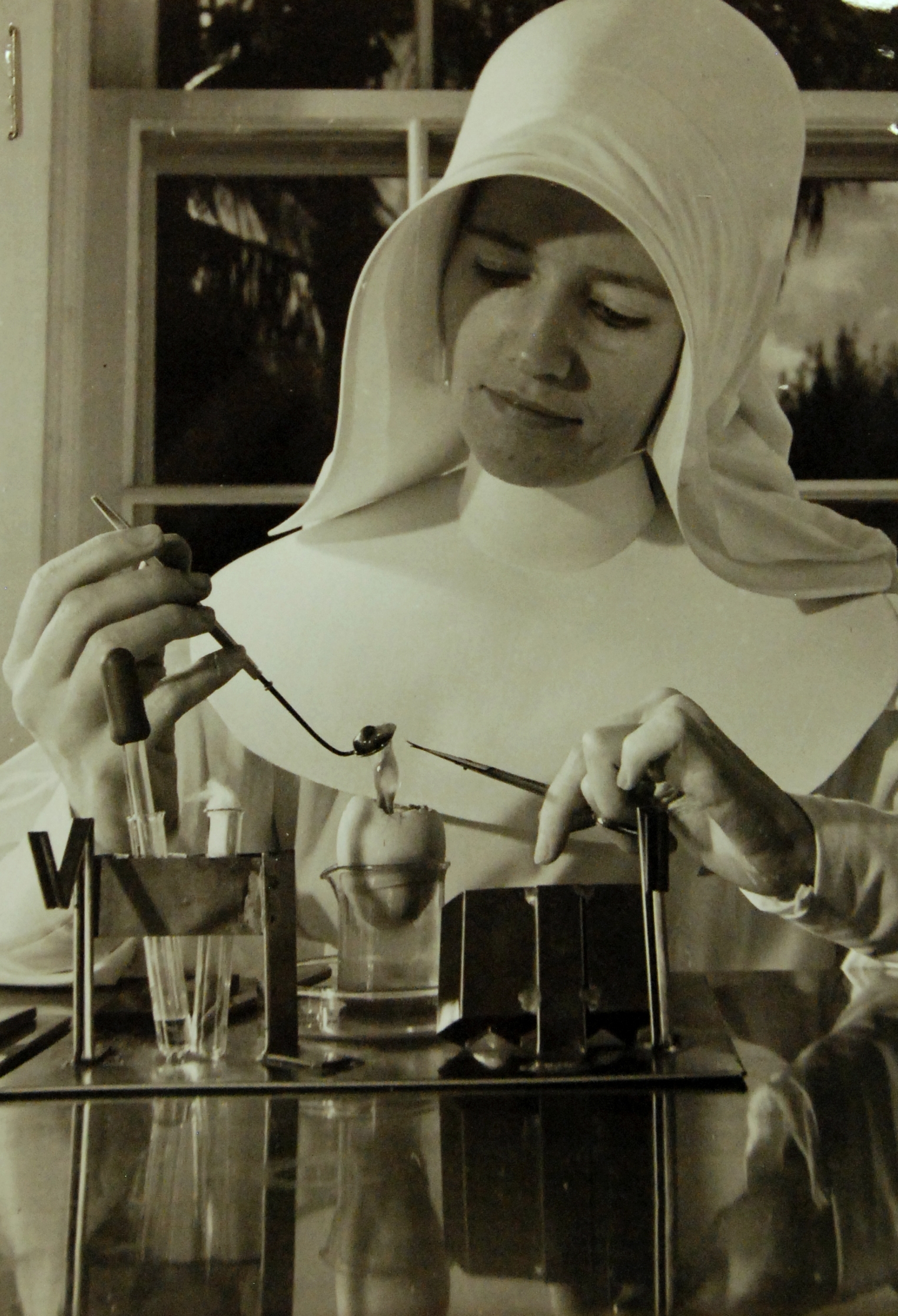
The Institutum Divi Thomae taught graduate-level science to religious sisters as well as lay people.

=== Incorporation into the Athenaeum of Ohio ===
In September 1928, St. Gregory, along with Mt. St. Mary and the newly founded Teacher's College of the Archdiocese of Cincinnati, was incorporated into the Athenaeum of Ohio, an entity created to oversee the educational endeavors of the Archdiocese. This was due in part to new teacher certification requirements issued by the Ohio Department of Education that same year.

In 1931, the high school department was certified as "the equivalent of a Public High School of the First Grade and as such merits ... recognition." The high school and college programs began the 1931 school year with 260 students, educating students from the dioceses of Toledo, Fort Wayne, Nashville, Grand Rapids, Wheeling, Charleston, and Sacramento in addition to those from Cincinnati itself and the Maryknoll Society.

From 1925 to 1940, approximately 800 students entered Saint Gregory, with 150 of these going on to be ordained. During the time of the Great Depression, enrollment declined to 222, and this drop continued into the war, with the total student body numbering under 200. By the end of World War II, enrollment rose again to over 300.

From its founding in September 1935 to 1942, the Institutum Divi Thomae under the leadership of George Sperti was located at St. Gregory. During the Second World War, silkworms were raised in the facility in an attempt to challenge Japan's domination of the silk trade in a form of economic warfare.

=== Planned expansion and 1956 Good Friday fire ===
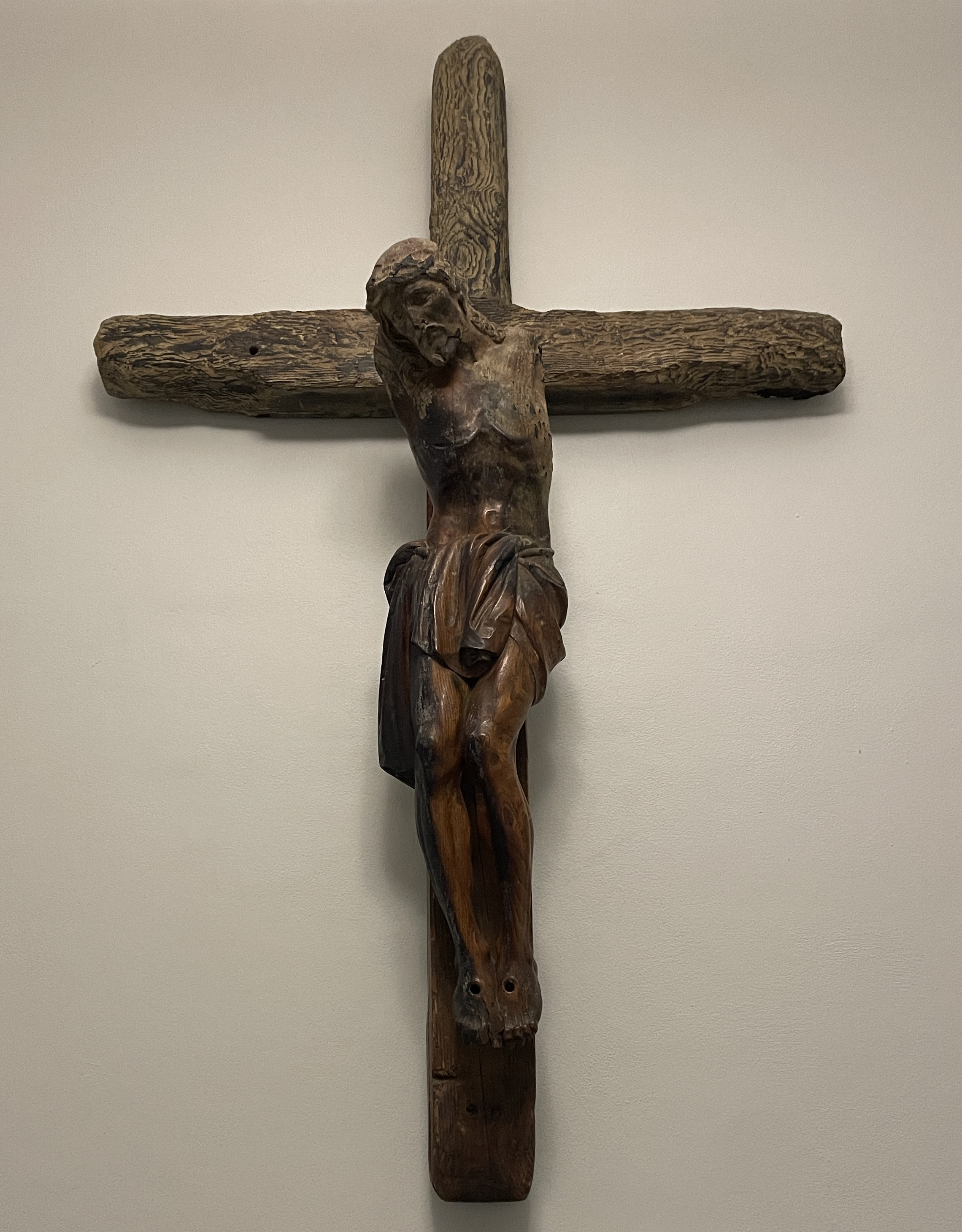
This crucifix, damaged in the 1956 fire, now hangs near the entry of the refectory at Mt. St. Mary.

In July 1952, Archbishop Karl Alter announced plans to complete the planned second wing of St, Gregory and renovate the existing 1890 building, in conjunction with major renovations at St. Peter In Chains Cathedral. Growth in enrollment at St. Gregory had resulted in acute overcrowding, especially in the chapel. When the original worship space had been outgrown, multiple classrooms had been merged and a sacristy made of canvas tarping. The overall arrangement was described as "unchurchly". Dining facilities as well were especially overcrowded. Ground was broken on the first building of the new construction, a boiler house, in November 1955 and completed a year later. Soon after its completion, on March 31, 1956 — Good Friday — a fire broke out in the boiler room of the old brick seminary building at 1:30am, likely due to a concentration of power lines there. Loss of life was prevented by the fact that students were at home assisting in parishes rather than living at the seminary. Over 10,000 volumes of the classical library of the seminary and faculty, as well as the chapel and kitchen, were destroyed by the 20-hour fire. The long duration was in part because of low water pressure in fire hydrants in the area.

Following the fire, a crucifix which had previously hung in an outdoor shrine on the property was restored by Fr. John Stenz. While the main body of the figure of Christ was intact, its arms were destroyed. It was hung above the entrance to the seminary dining hall with the words "You are my arms and my hands" as a caption beneath it.

=== Chapel of St. Gregory and rebuilding ===
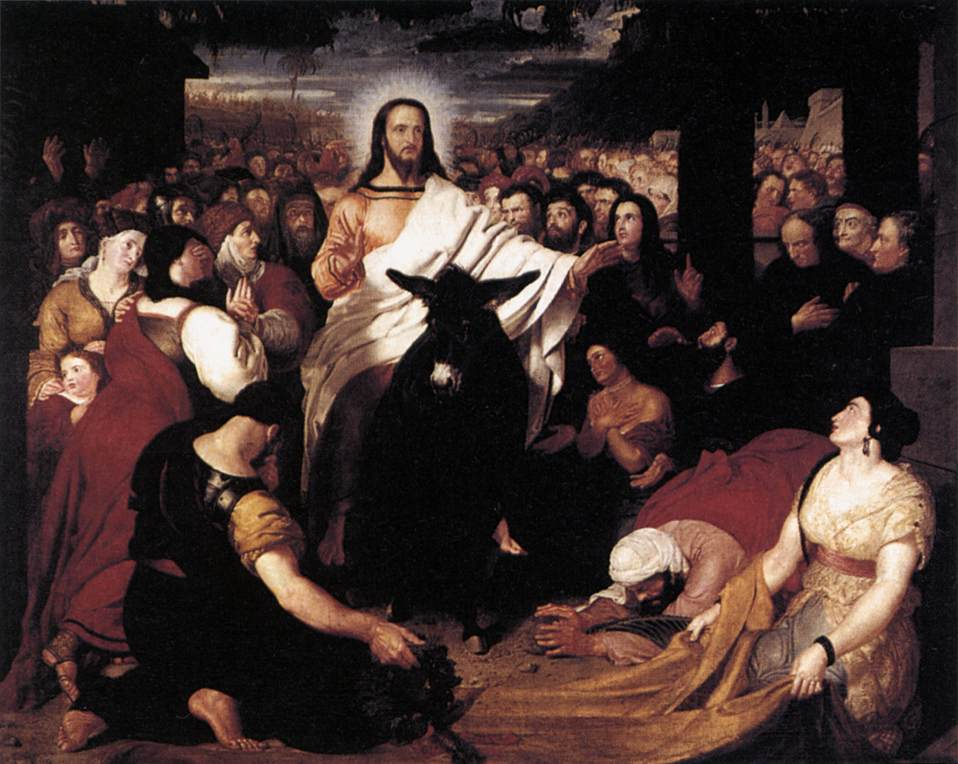
Benjamin Robert Haydon's painting of Christ's Entry into Jerusalem was put on display in the atrium of St, Gregory in 1961.

Alter announced that the already-planned expansion project would be accelerated due to the fire, a temporary brick building serving as an interim cafeteria was built where the south wing of the old building had stood before the blaze. This building is now the Bartlett Pastoral Center at Mt. St. Mary. Ground was broken by Alter for a new chapel that would house a dining hall and kitchen in its basement in October 1956. The cornerstone of the new chapel was set on September 8, 1961, and the building was occupied a year later. During the course of construction, a niche in the atrium of the chapel was built for the Benjamin Haydon painting, Christ's Entry Into Jerusalem. The canvas was installed in the same month after being moved from the Norwood seminary campus. Also exhibited in the atrium is the only work of Juan de las Roelas in the western hemisphere, his rendition of the Liberation of St. Peter. Both paintings remain there to this day. Above the main entrance and at the right-hand altar are mosaics by Vatican artisans, featuring the Pietà and the Blessed Virgin Mary.

The chapel itself was designed by William R. Perry in the Italo-Byzantine style, drawing inspiration from the Basilica Ursiana and San Giovanni Evangelista, both in Ravenna. The forty-foot-high, four-ton reredos of the chapel is made of african mahogany and holds nineteen polychrome statues of saints carved by German artist August Schmidt. Featured prominently are Pope Gregory I, the patron of the chapel, Francis de Sales, the primary patron of the archdiocese, and Robert Bellarmine, a secondary patron of the archdiocese. The altar candlesticks and tabernacle are bronze with champlevé enamel, and the stained glass windows were created in Munich.

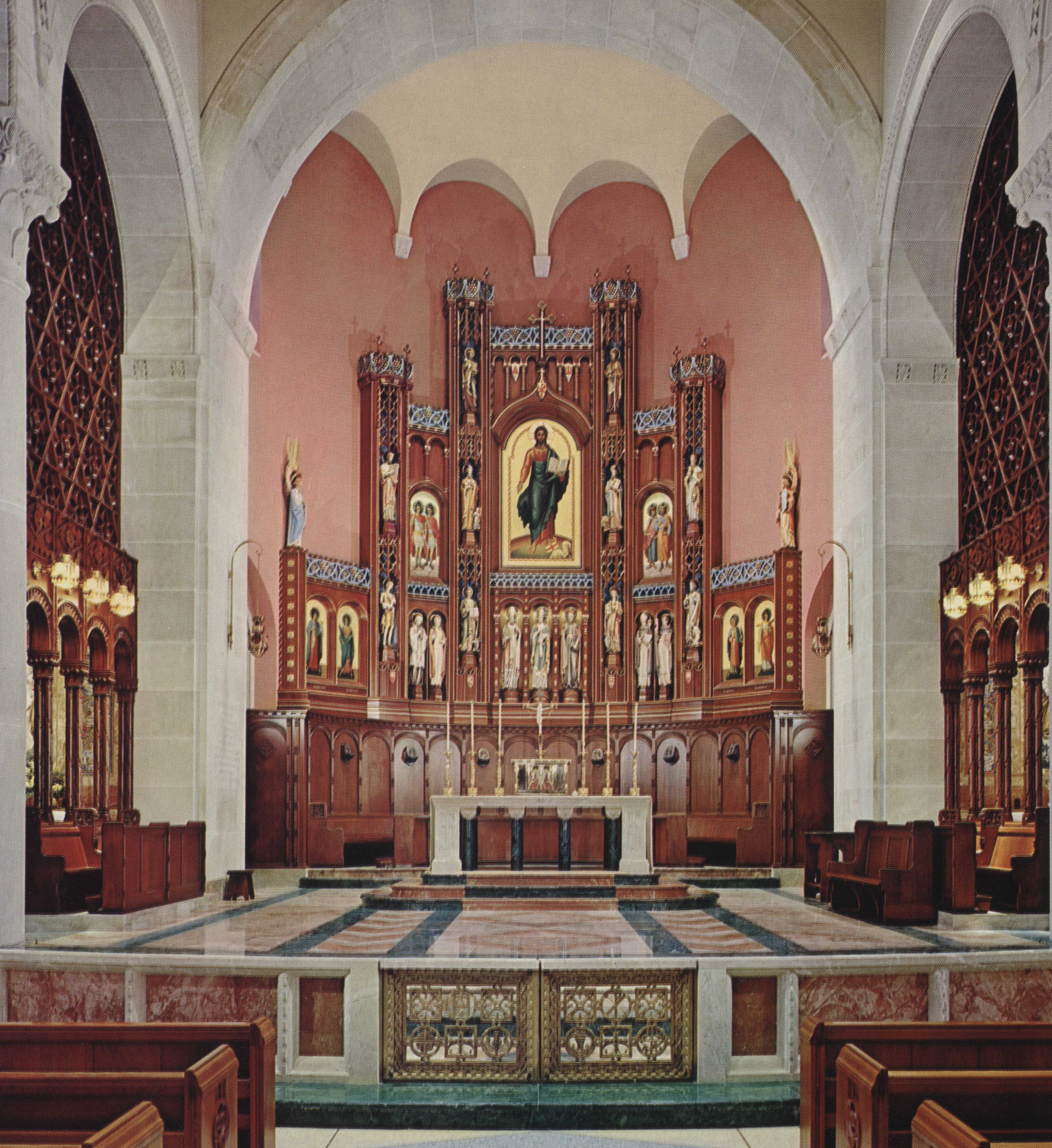
The sanctuary and reredos of the chapel of Saint Gregory.

The new wing was blessed and the altar in the chapel of St. Gregory was consecrated on May 25, 1963, by Archbishop Alter in the presence of Egidio Vagnozzi, then-Apostolic Delegate to the United States. The chapel, with a capacity for 500, was formally consecrated by Cardinal Albert Meyer on August 27, 1963. Estimates for the cost of the expansion program of 1955-1963 exceed five million dollars. The general architrctural design for both the 1926 and 1963 phases of the building was by Maginnis & Walsh, the same firm who designed the Basilica of the National Shrine of the Immaculate Conception.

=== Reforms in the era of Vatican II ===
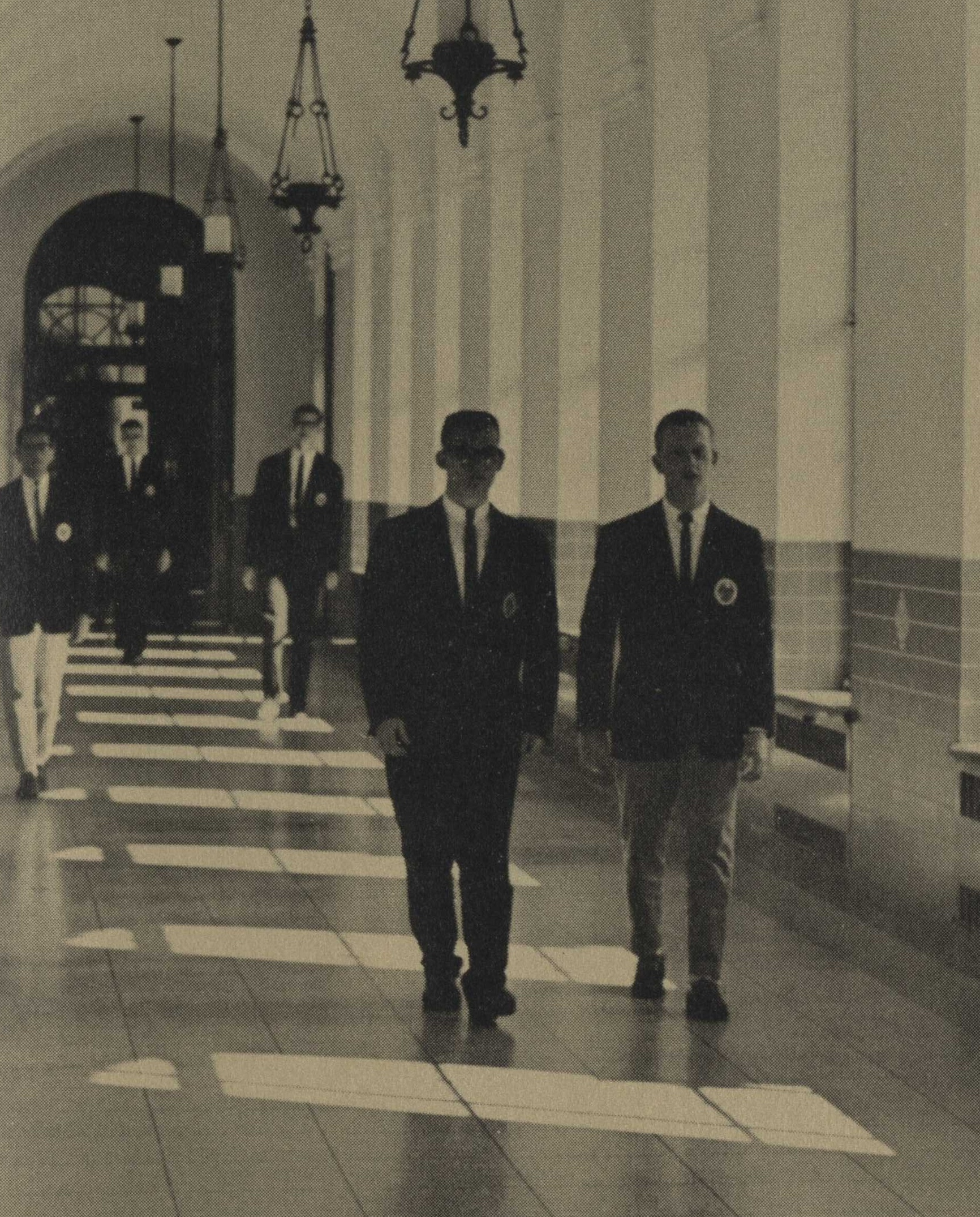
Saint Gregory students walking down a hallway circa 1964.

By 1962, both the freshman and sophomore classes of the high school program had been discontinued and replaced with the Gregorian Pre-Seminary Training Program, where participants would attend diocesan high schools and live at home under the guidance of priest-moderators. This was due in part to rising maintenance costs for the seminary as well as small percentages of first and second-year high school students remaining in seminary until ordination. The implementation of Optatam Totius at St. Gregory resulted in relaxed rules regarding cigarette smoking, telephone use, and visitors to the seminary. Academically, it led to a greater array of elective courses in science being added to the liberal arts program and Bachelor of Arts degrees in English and history being offered. Previously, philosophy had been the only degree program. In 1969 and 1979 the junior and senior years of the high school program were phased out, leaving only the undergraduate college program remaining. By 1979, only 55 students were enrolled at St. Gregory.

=== Closure and move of Mount Saint Mary ===
In March 1978, a committee was formed by the board of the Athenaeum to study the future of the college in light of declining enrollment. In July 1979, it was announced that St. Gregory would close, with remaining students transferring to the college program of the Pontifical College Josephinum in Worthington, Ohio. The last class of 11 students graduated from St. Gregory on May 16, 1980.

Around the time of the closing of the seminary, officials in Anderson Township expressed interest in turning the soon-vacant building into a hospital or nursing home. However, the Norwood campus of Mt. St. Mary had also fallen into disrepair at this time, and renovations would have cost over a million dollars. Additionally, a feasibility study found that the physical campus and versatility of the property were preferable to the Norwood campus. This led to the major seminary being moved to the Mount Washington campus in September 1981 following extensive remodeling. The Norwood site now houses the Our Lady of the Holy Spirit Center. The Lay Pastoral Ministry and permanent diaconate programs, the other institutions remaining under the control of the Athenaeum, also moved to the campus. The original 1890 building, then called Fenwick Hall and being used for faculty housing, was demolished in June 1981 due to concerns regarding energy efficiency.

== Student life and extracurriculars ==
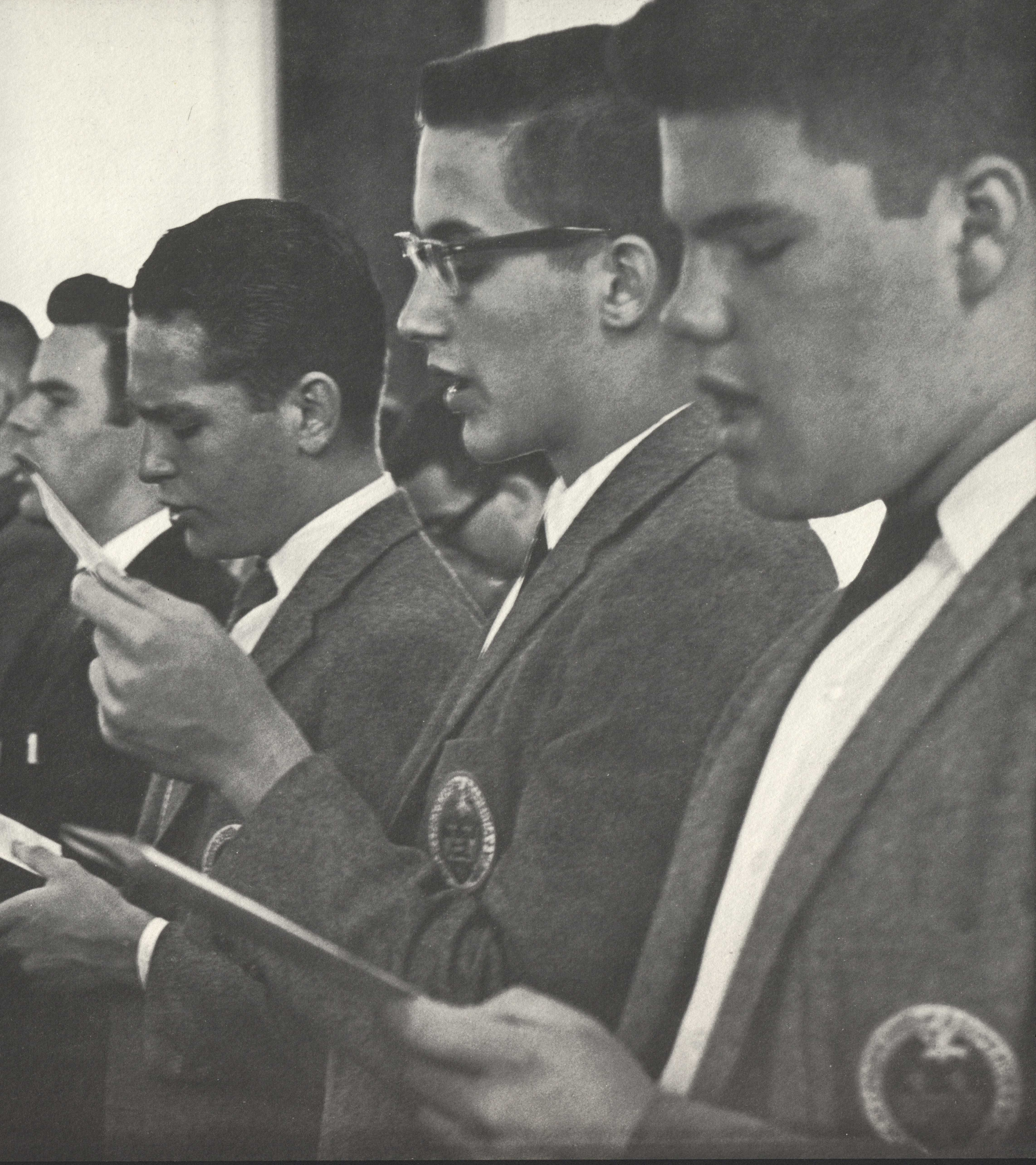
Saint Gregory seminarians singing, circa 1964.

The seminary schola, or Latin choir, of St. Gregory frequently sang at special Masses and other events throughout its existence, including for the silver jubilee of Bishop Elder's ordination, school dedications in the archdiocese, and even a concert at Cincinnati Music Hall. Oratorical contests and performances of Shakespeare and other dramatic works were also a common pastime, many being staged in an outdoor amphitheater behind the seminary under the instruction of Father George Berwanger, an English professor.

Sports were also played against the teams of other Cincinnati academic institutions. Seminarians played basketball against the teams of other local Catholic schools, including St. Rita School for the Deaf, St. Francis Seminary, and the Covington Latin School. The Saint Gregory baseball team played against their graduate counterparts at Mount Saint Mary, as well as Xavier University.

Priest-professors of St. Gregory, when not teaching or engaged in other duties related to their work, had hobbies including painting, woodcarving, and furniture-making. One priest, Fr. Vincent Lewis, kept a flock of 250 pet parakeets and other birds, teaching them Latin and Greek phrases.

== Campus grounds ==
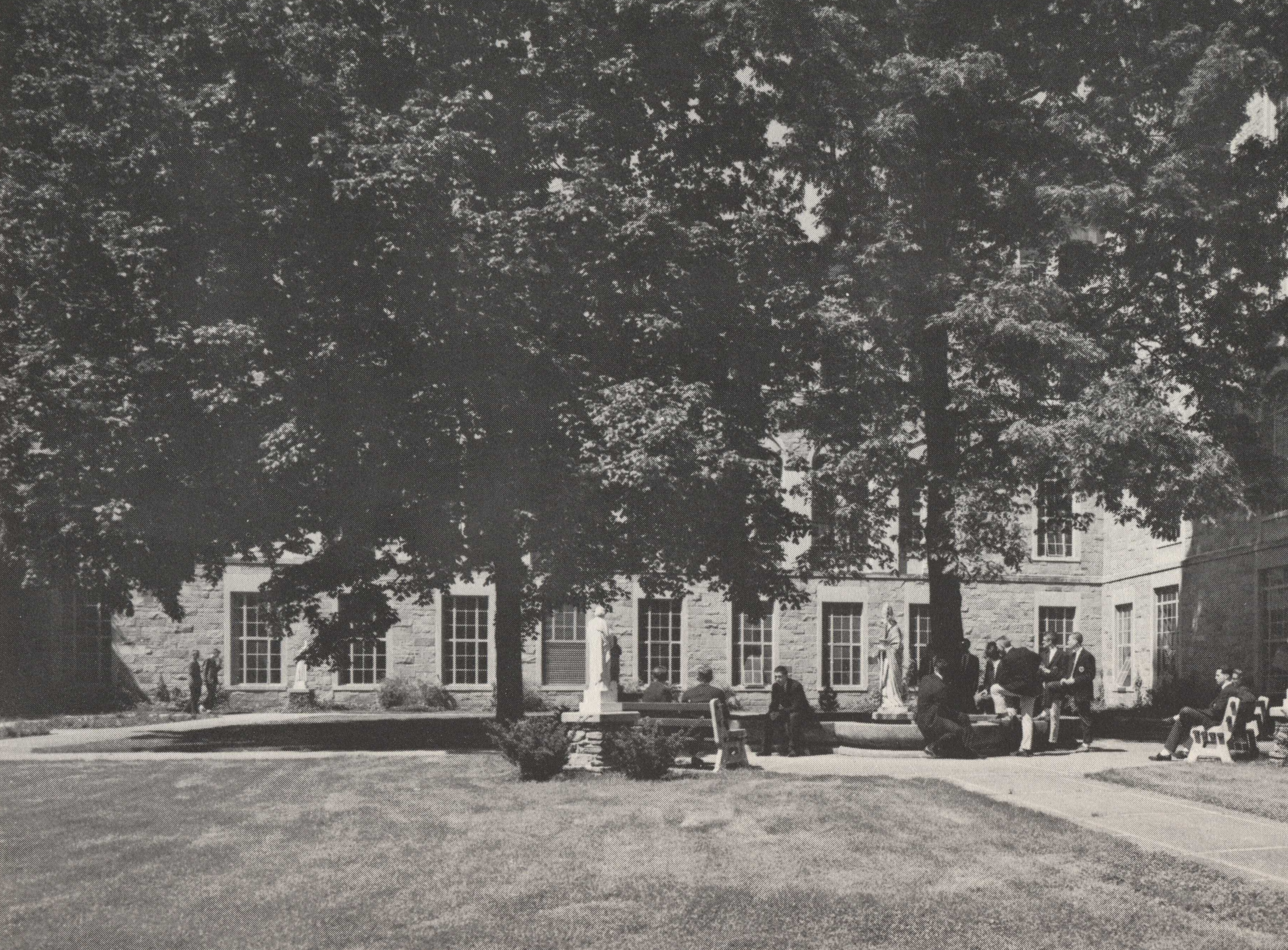
The Saint Gregory courtyard circa 1964

The 1929 building included a courtyard modeled after a European monastic cloister, with twelve statues of saints surrounding a figure of St. Gregory the Great, the seminary patron, atop a fountain. The garden and statues, along with the altar and furnishings of the archbishop's suite, were provided by former Ohio State Senator Robert J. O'Brien. The two other courtyards, formed by the 1963 wing of the building, include brass reliefs of the Stations of the Cross in one garden, along with a statue of the Virgin Mary in the other.

== Rectors ==
1. Fr. John C. Albrinck, Ph.D., 1890–1892
2. Fr. J. Henry Brinkmeyer, 1892–1907
3. Fr. Joseph S. Seiber, 1923–1926
4. Fr. Urban J. Vehr, J.C.L., 1926–1929
5. Fr. Robert J. Sherry, J.C.D., 1929–1937
6. Fr. Walter A. Roddy, S.T.D., 1937–1949
7. Fr. William J. Gauche, S.T.D, Ph.D., 1949–1954
8. Fr. Robert J. Sherry, J.C.D., 1954–1961
9. Fr. Robert J. Krumholtz, S.T.D., 1961–1968
10. Fr. Daniel E. Pilarczyk, S.T.D, Ph.D., 1968–1974
11. Fr. Francis W. Voellmecke, S.T.L., 1974-1980

== Notable alumni ==
- Cardinal Donald Wuerl, Archdiocese of Washington
- Cardinal Samuel Stritch, Archdiocese of Chicago
- Archbishop Daniel Edward Pilarczyk, Archdiocese of Cincinnati, also served as rector from 1968 to 1974
- Archbishop Francis Beckman, Archdiocese of Dubuque
- Archbishop Paul Francis Leibold, Archdiocese of Cincinnati
- Bishop Paul Vincent Donovan, Diocese of Kalamazoo
- Bishop Robert Daniel Conlon, Diocese of Steubenville
- Bishop Michael Joseph Green, Diocese of Reno
- Bishop George John Rehring, Diocese of Toledo
- Bishop Henry Joseph Grimmelsmann, Diocese of Evansville
- Bishop Michael William Warfel, Diocese of Great Falls-Billings
- Bishop Edward A. McCarthy, Diocese of Phoenix
- Bishop Alphonse John Smith, Diocese of Nashville
- Bishop Clarence George Issenmann, Diocese of Cleveland
- Bishop Anthony John King Mussio, Diocese of Steubenville
- Bishop Joseph H. Albers, Diocese of Lansing
- Bishop Anthony Pilla, auxiliary bishop, Diocese of Cleveland
- Bishop Carl K. Moeddel, auxiliary bishop, Archdiocese of Cincinnati
