= Old St. Mary's Church (Cincinnati, Ohio) =

Historic site in Hamilton County, Ohio, US

- Old St. Mary's Church, School and Rectory
- U.S. National Register of Historic Places
- U.S. Historic district – Contributing property
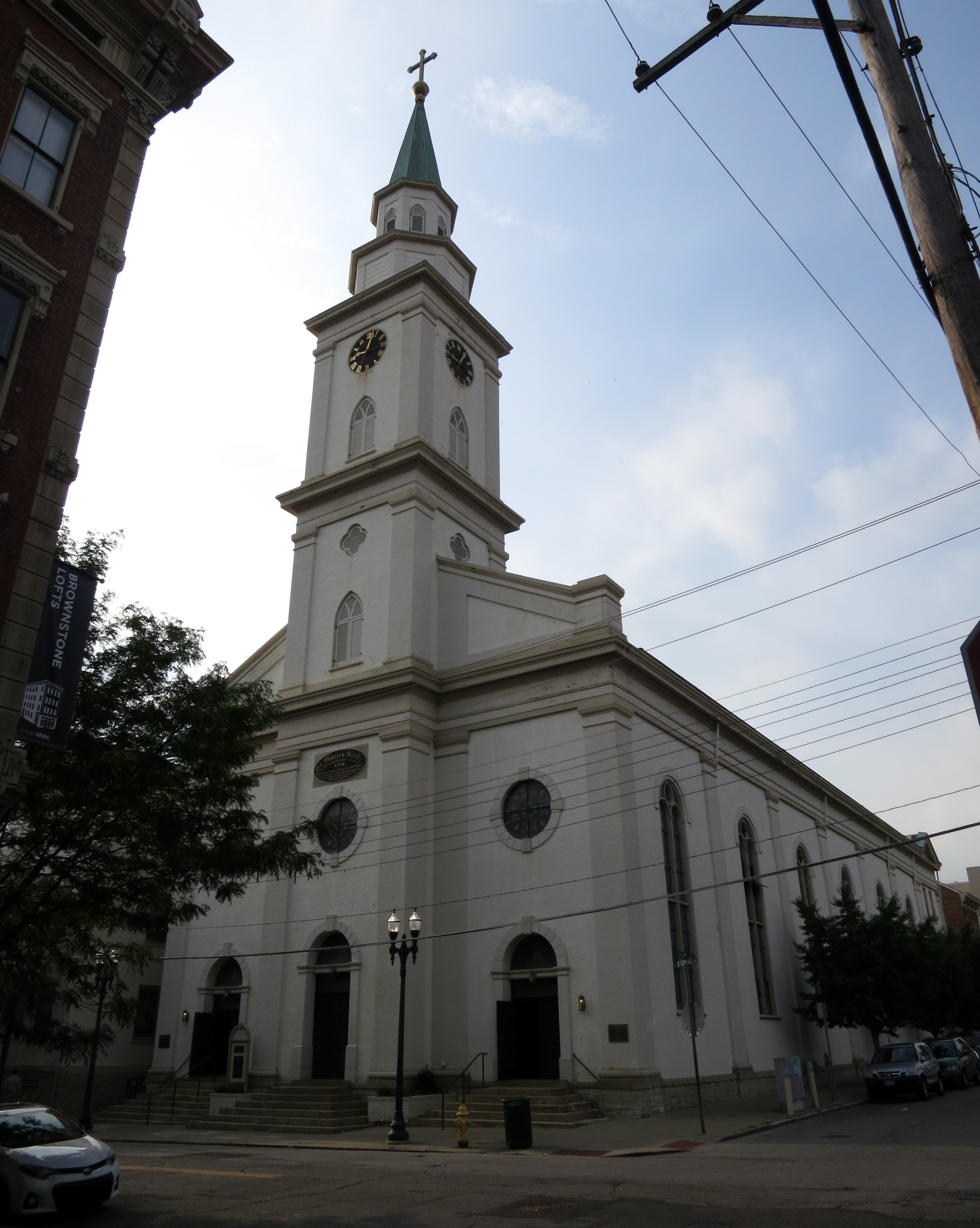
- Front of the church with its tower

- Location within Ohio Location within the United States
- Location: 123 E. 13th St., Cincinnati, Ohio
- Coordinates: 39°06′34″N 84°30′45″W
- Area: 1.9 acres (0.77 ha)
- Built: 1841
- Architect: Franz Ignatz Erd
- Architectural style: Greek Revival, Late Victorian
- Part of: Over-the-Rhine Historic District (ID83001985)
- NRHP reference No.: 76001439
- Added to NRHP: March 13, 1976

Old St. Mary's Church is a Roman Catholic church in Cincinnati's historic Over-The-Rhine neighborhood. It is the oldest continually-used house of worship in Cincinnati.

Old St. Mary's is the oldest church in Cincinnati, and since 2017, home to The Cincinnati Oratory, a society of priests and brothers of The Congregation of the Oratory of St. Philip Neri. The church was organized in 1840 by German immigrants, at a time of dramatic growth in the city's population.

Designed in the Greek Revival style by Franz Ignatz Erd, it is the second-oldest German-Catholic parish in the city and the oldest standing church in Cincinnati. The church is 142 feet long, 66 feet wide and with a steeple 170 feet tall. When built, it was the largest church in the Ohio Valley. The original church was dedicated on July 3, 1842.

== History ==
The parent parish was Holy Trinity Church (Heilige Dreieinigkeit), which was located at West Fifth Street and Barr Street/Mound Street, in Cincinnati's Old West End. Organized in 1834, Holy Trinity was the first German parish and second Roman Catholic parish in Cincinnati. The Holy Trinity Parish was closed in 1958 because of changing demographics. As the congregation grew, a new parish was needed.

In 1840, German immigrants were arriving in Cincinnati at the rate of 200 per day. Many of the men donated their own labor to build the church, making the bricks by hand. The number of German immigrants increased in mid-century, with many arriving after the 1848 revolutions in various principalities.

The St. Clair estate was acquired and the cornerstone was laid March 25, 1841 by Bishop Purcell. Father Clemens Hammer was the first pastor. St. Mary's has the oldest clock tower in Cincinnati. In 1842, a clock was installed in the steeple of St. Mary's. The first bell was blessed and placed in the tower in 1843. For many years it served as the fire alarm for the northeastern section of the city.

A new organ was installed in 1846. A parish school was opened in 1844 and in 1846 the Sisters of Notre Dame de Namur came to teach. In 1852 a school for boys was opened, staffed by the Marianist brothers. In May through August 1849, during the cholera epidemic in Cincinnati, 796 parishioners of St. Mary's died. There were 345 funerals in July.

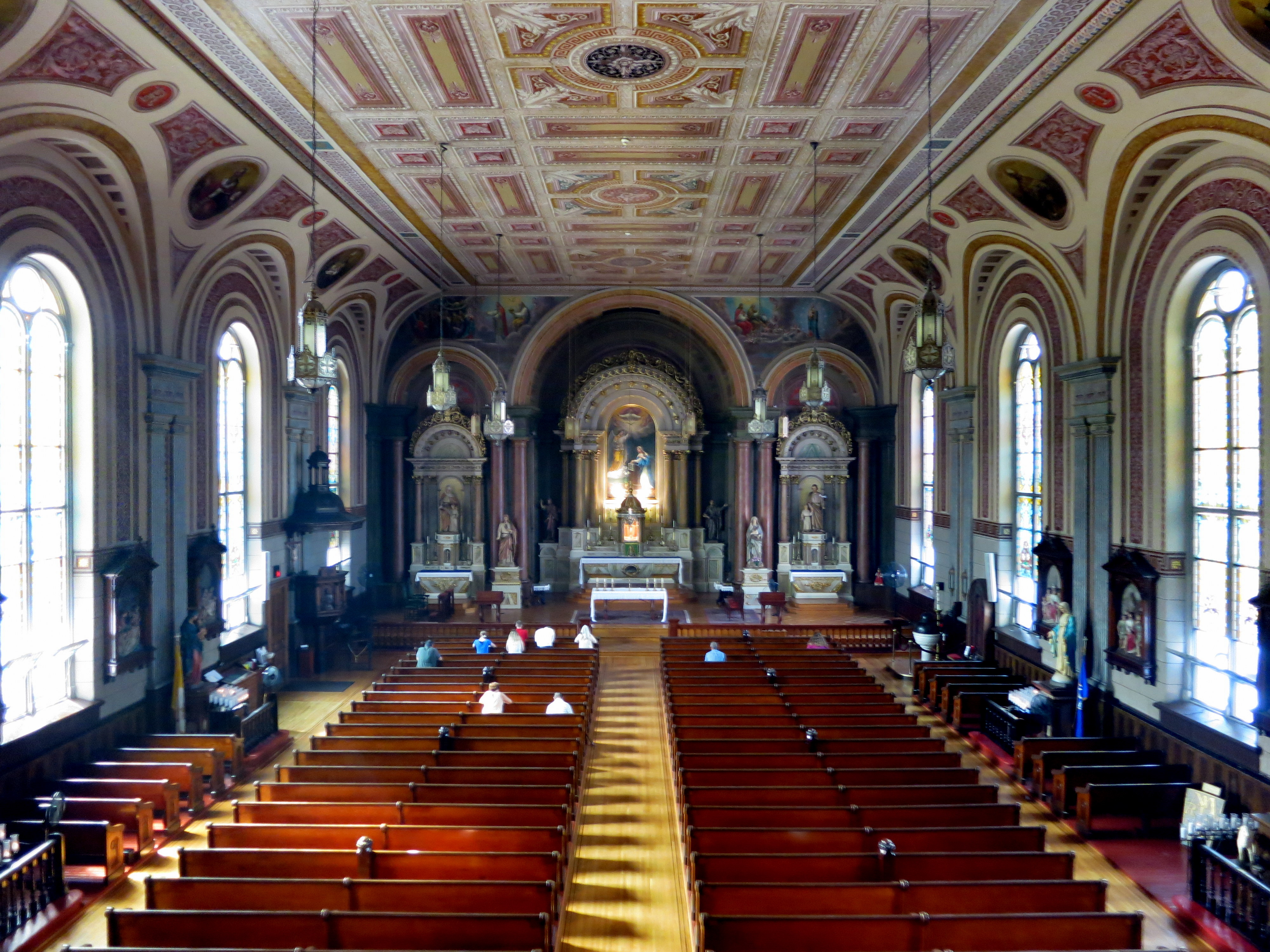
The church nave as viewed from the loft.

The church was enlarged in 1865, and remodeled in 1890. The term "Old" was added to the name of this church in 1904 after St. Mary's in Hyde Park (Cincinnati) was founded. In 1929, a second organ, from the Austin Organs was donated to the church.

The three buildings of the Old St. Mary's parish complex were listed together on the National Register of Historic Places in 1976. Seven years later, they were among more than two thousand Over-the-Rhine buildings listed on the Register together as contributing to the Over-the-Rhine Historic District.

Joseph H. Albers D.D. was ordained a priest in 1916. Father Albers' first appointment was in Cincinnati as an assistant pastor at Old St. Mary's Church, School. As an armed forces chaplain in World War I, Father Albers was decorated and received the Silver Star (presumably the Citation Star which was its predecessor) for bravery and valor. Thereafter, he was assigned to establish the new Diocese of Lansing, Michigan in 1937, and was its first bishop (1937–1964).

== Pastors ==
- Rev. Clemens Hammer (1842–1860)
- Rev. B. Elkman (1861–1881)
- Rev. B.J. Menge (1881–1897)
- Rev. Bernard Moeller (1898–1915)
- Rev. Joseph T. Duerstock (1916–1941)
- Very Rev. Jon-Paul Bevak (2016–present)

== Present day ==
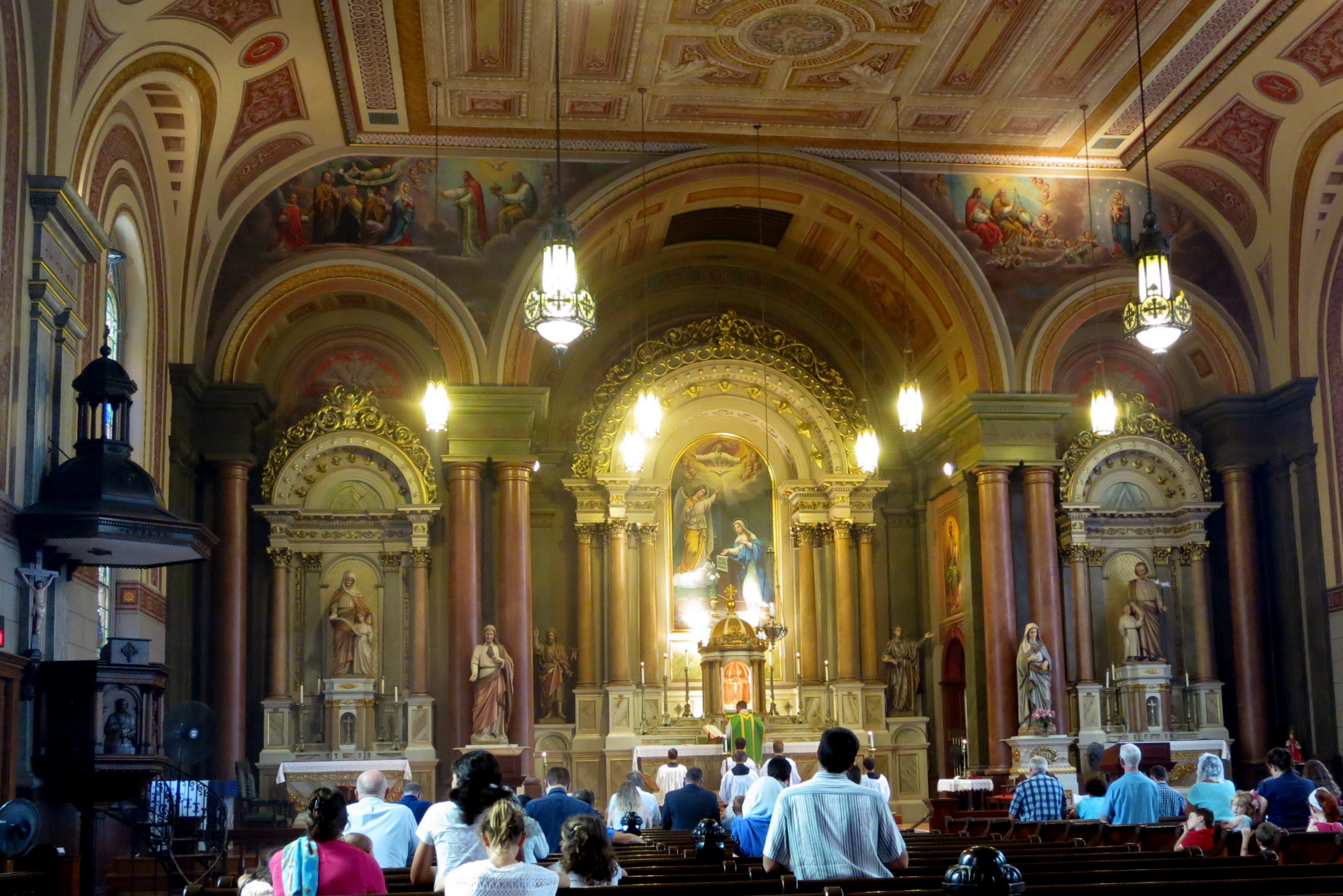
A Mass being celebrated at the church.

The parish practices a full range of the rich liturgical, musical, and cultural heritages of the Roman Catholic tradition. Mass is offered in Latin and English every weekday, and in Latin, German, and English every Sunday. The Latin Mass features a schola of professional singers who provide music from the Church's treasury of sacred music each Sunday October through June and on special feast days.

Old St. Mary’s Church is the Oratory Church and main base of activity. The Oratorians also has care of Sacred Heart Church in Camp Washington.
