= Heinrich Hoffman =

United States Army Medal of Honor recipient (1836–1894)

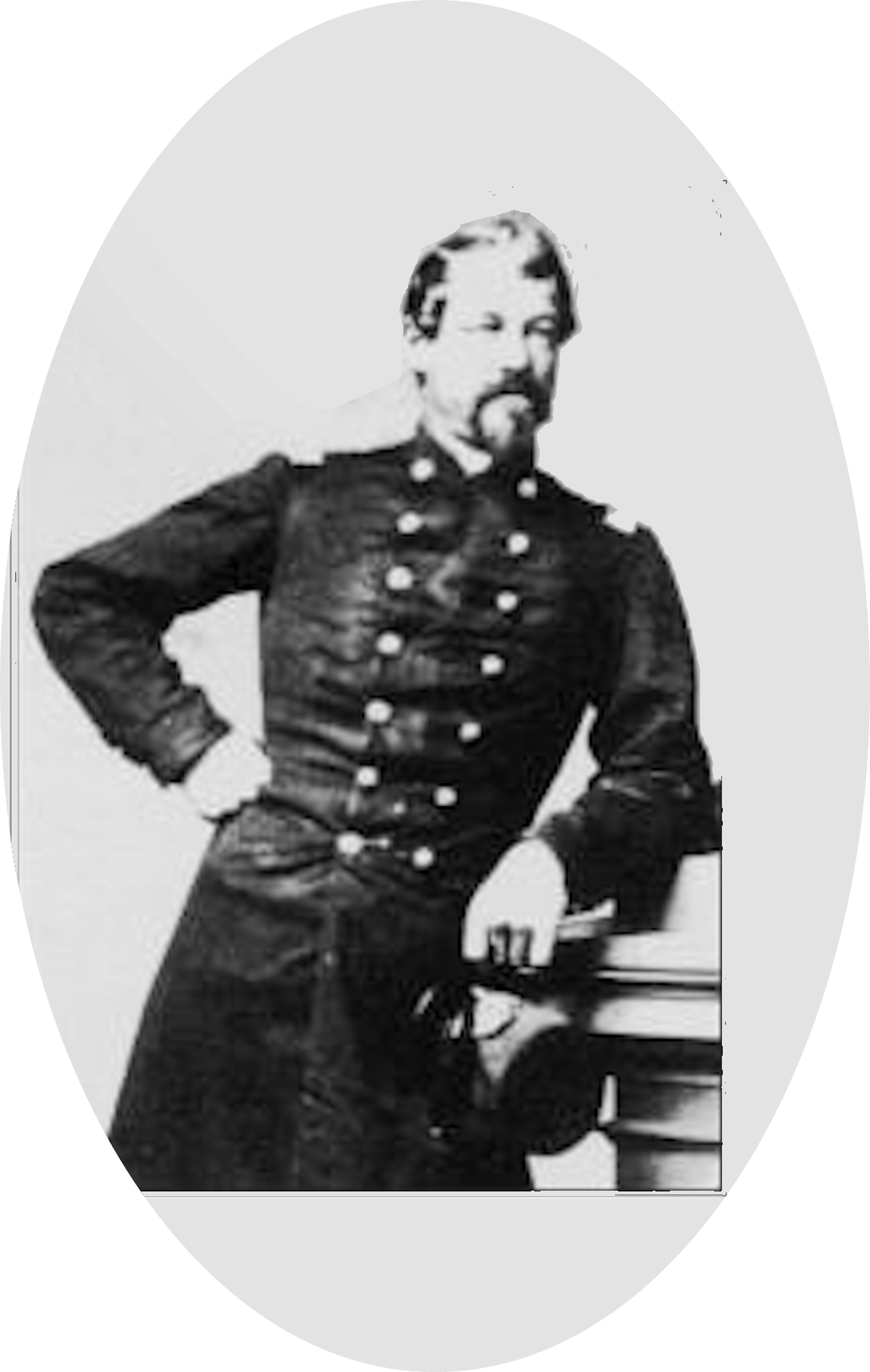
- Born: December 23, 1836; Baden-Württemberg, Germany
- Died: January 4, 1894 (aged 57); Cincinnati, Ohio, US
- Burial place: Old St. Joseph's Cemetery, Cincinnati, Ohio
- Military career
- Allegiance: United States; Union
- Branch: Union Army
- Rank: Corporal
- Units: Company M, 2nd Ohio Cavalry
- Conflicts: American Civil War: Battle of Sayler's Creek
- Awards: Medal of Honor

Heinrich Hoffman was born on December 23, 1836. He served in the American Civil War, and was a Medal of Honor Recipient. He served as a Corporal in the Union Army in Company M, 2nd Ohio Cavalry. He received the Medal of Honor for action on April 6, 1865, at the Battle of Sayler's Creek, Virginia.

He is buried at Old St. Joseph's Cemetery in Cincinnati, Ohio.

== Medal of Honor citation ==
His citation reads "Capture of flag."

== See also ==
- List of Medal of Honor recipients
