= Mount Washington, Cincinnati =

Neighborhood of Cincinnati, Ohio, United States

Mount Washington
- Neighborhood of Cincinnati
- The Mount Washington Business District and Water Tower, Beechmont Avenue

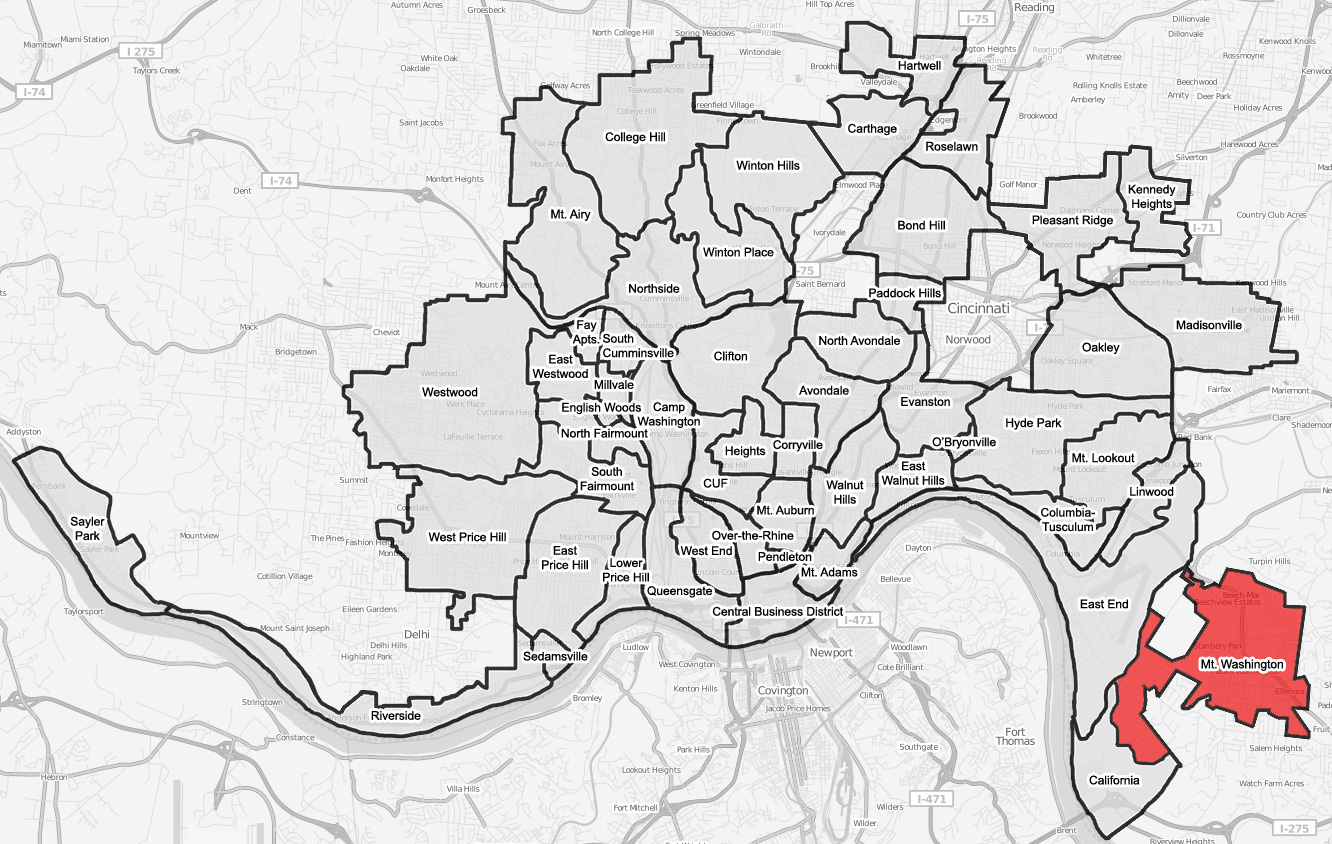
- Mount Washington (red) within Cincinnati, Ohio
- Country: United States
- State: Ohio
- County: Hamilton
- City: Cincinnati

Population (2020)
  - Total: 15,357

Mount Washington is one of the 52 neighborhoods of Cincinnati, Ohio, United States. It is located along the eastern boundary of Cincinnati and shares a border with Anderson Township. The City of Cincinnati's 2020 Statistical Neighborhood Approximation recorded a population of 15,357.

== History ==
Mount Washington was originally part of Anderson Township and lies within the Virginia Military District. Settlers began farming the area in the 1790s. The village was laid out in 1846 by John L. Corbly and originally consisted of a small number of lots along the Ohio Pike. Stephen J. Sutton, the first purchaser, established the village's first store, served as its first postmaster, and is credited with giving Mount Washington its name.

Mount Washington was incorporated as a village on October 24, 1867. The Cincinnati, Georgetown & Portsmouth Railroad was constructed through the area in 1877–78, providing a direct transportation connection with Cincinnati. Rail and interurban development contributed to the growth of Mount Washington during the late 19th century, and by 1900 the community had approximately 800 residents. As its population grew, local public services became inadequate, and the village was annexed by the City of Cincinnati in 1911.

Residential and commercial construction slowed during the Great Depression. Mount Washington Public School was built in 1933, and the Mount Washington Water Tower followed in 1939. By 1940, more than 3,000 people lived in the area. That same year, the Stanbery family donated its estate on the western side of the neighborhood to the City of Cincinnati for use as Stanbery Park. Following World War II, Mount Washington experienced substantial residential development, with most of its subdivisions constructed during the postwar period. Cincinnati continued annexing land to the neighborhood until 1967.

=== Mount Washington Water Tower ===
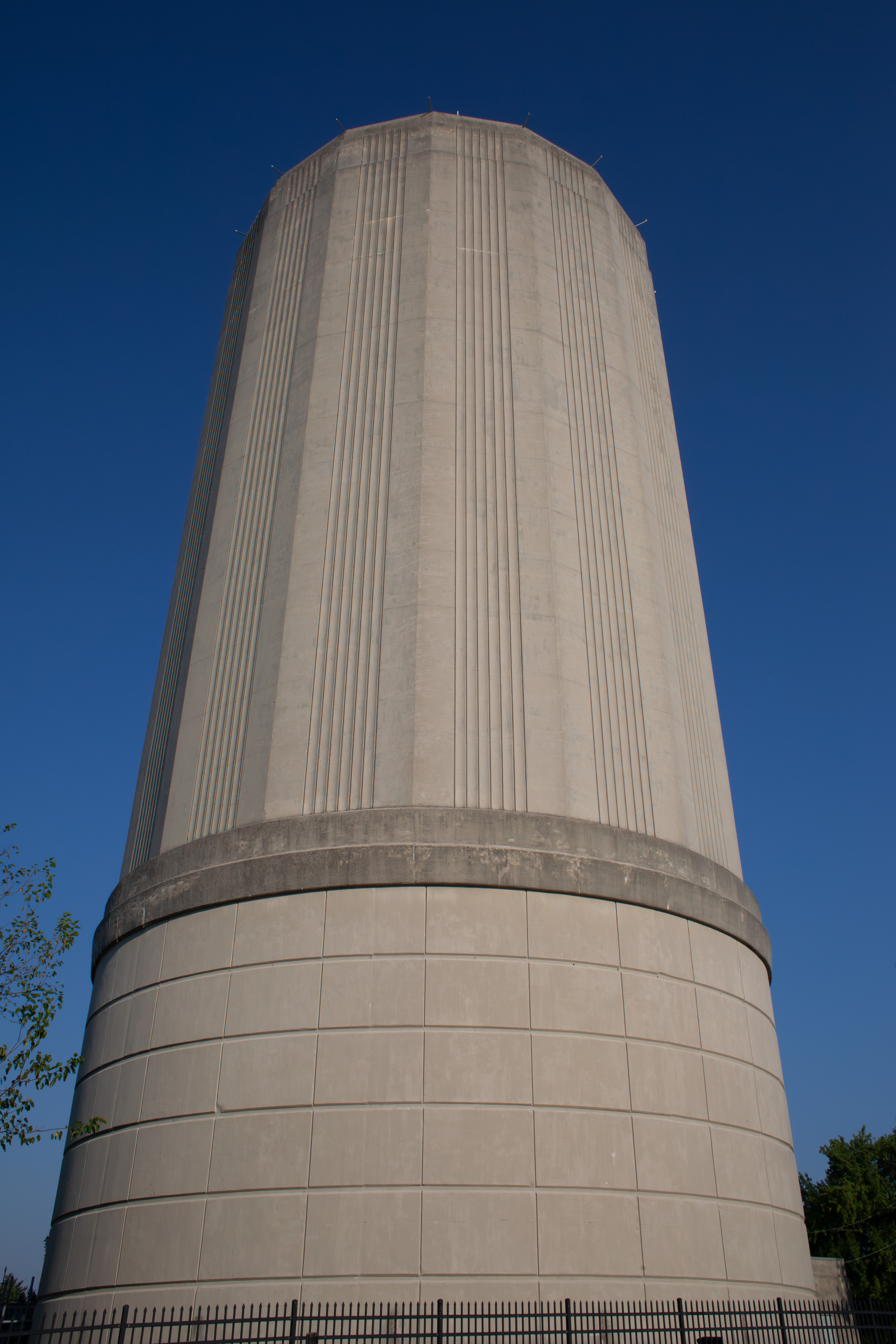
Daytime view from Mount Washington Cemetery.

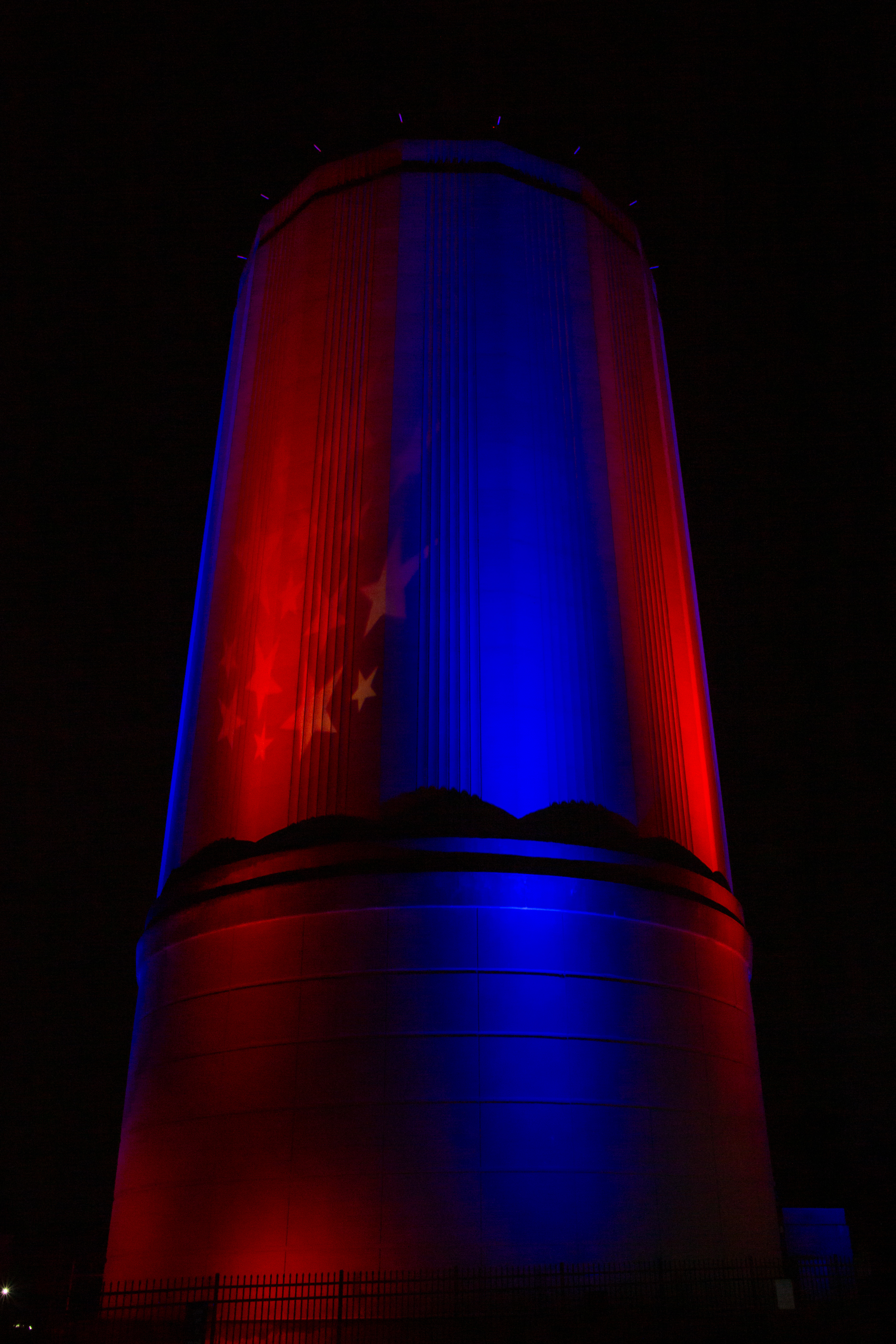
Illuminated at night.

The Mount Washington Water Tower, located at Beechmont Avenue and Campus Lane, was built in 1939 and placed into service on November 19, 1940. The reinforced-concrete standpipe is owned and operated by Greater Cincinnati Water Works (GCWW) and has an Art Deco-style exterior. GCWW states that a schoolhouse previously stood on the site.

According to the city's 2007 comprehensive plan, the tower was designed by Greater Cincinnati Water Works in conjunction with the architectural firm Kruckemeyer & Strong and design engineer W. S. Hewitt. The Ferro Concrete Construction Company served as the contractor.

The concrete structure measures approximately 153 feet (47 m) from ground level to the top of its dome and is approximately 110 feet (34 m) in diameter. GCWW gives its height as 198 feet (60 m) when measured to the top of the revolving beacon light. The original reservoir had a capacity of 3,000,000 US gallons (11,000,000 L).

The tower's original engineering differed from many other water-storage structures in the Cincinnati system. Rather than using an internal steel shell to contain the water, the post-tensioned reinforced-concrete structure itself served as the water-retaining vessel. By the mid-1960s, expansion of the water-distribution system created pressure problems when the water level fell into the lower portion of the original reservoir. A 1,200,000-US-gallon (4,500,000 L) steel elevated tank was subsequently installed within the upper half of the existing structure, and the exterior was renovated.

A small rectangular structure at the base originally served as a watchman's station. The watchman monitored the water level and telephoned readings to the pumping station. Telemeters installed in the mid-1940s eliminated the need for the watchman. A navigational beacon for Lunken Airport is mounted atop the tower. GCWW describes the structure as a local landmark and an icon of the Mount Washington community.

== Culture and events ==
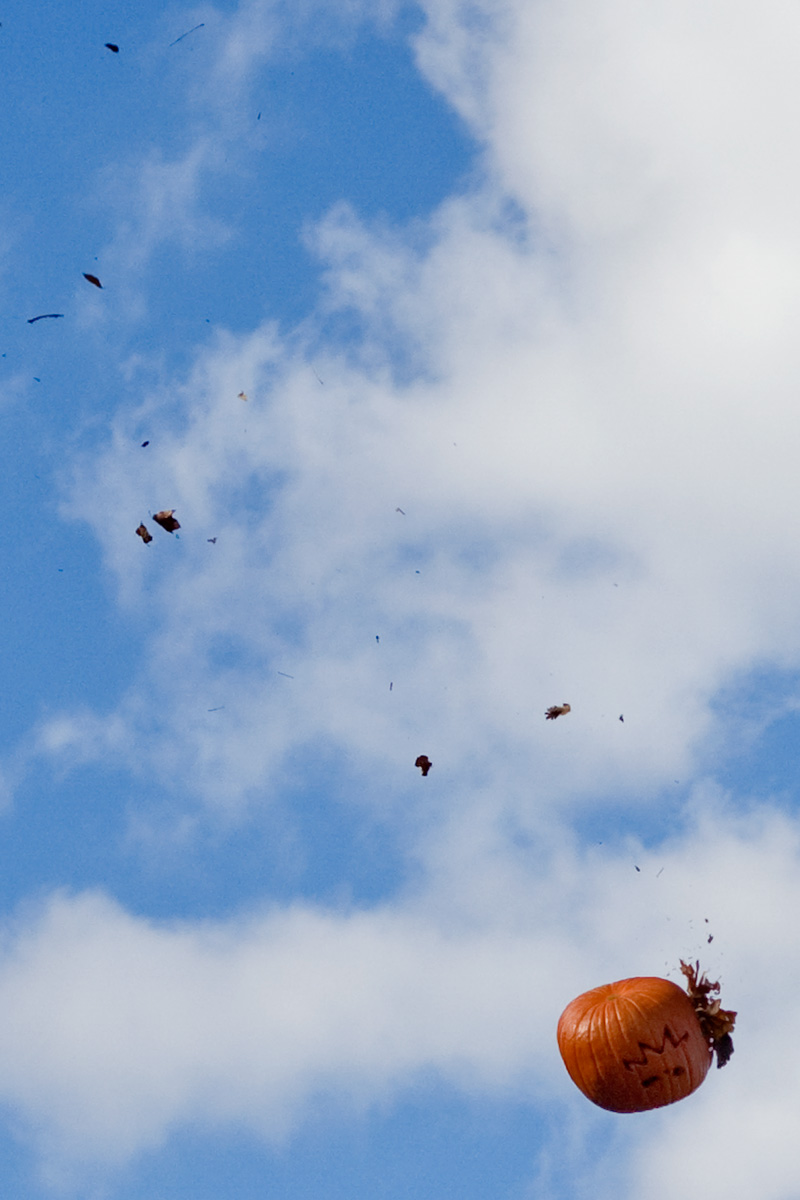
A pumpkin launched from a trebuchet at the annual Mount Washington Pumpkin Chuck.

Since 2006, Mount Washington has hosted the annual Pumpkin Chuck at Stanbery Park. Organized by the Mount Washington Community Council (MWCC) and Stanbery Park Advisory Council (SPAC), the event is held on the first Saturday following Halloween.

The festival features medieval-style trebuchets used to launch pumpkins down the park's sledding hill. The machines have been named "Treb One", "Baby Treb", and "The Trebinator". The event also includes food vendors, craft beer, live entertainment, and family activities. Proceeds support the Mount Washington Community Council and Stanbery Park Advisory Council and are used for community and park projects.

== Demographics ==
The City of Cincinnati's 2020 Statistical Neighborhood Approximation recorded 15,357 residents and 7,790 housing units in Mount Washington. The city notes that Statistical Neighborhood Approximation boundaries are created by matching census tract boundaries to community council boundaries as closely as possible and are used to calculate neighborhood demographic data.

The racial makeup recorded in the 2020 census data was 81.6% White, 9.2% Black or African American, 0.2% American Indian and Alaska Native, 1.7% Asian, less than 0.1% Native Hawaiian and Other Pacific Islander, 1.0% some other race, and 6.2% two or more races. Hispanic or Latino residents of any race made up 2.9% of the population.

According to the 2016–2020 American Community Survey estimates used by the City of Cincinnati, Mount Washington had an estimated 7,165 households, of which 3,806 were family households. The estimated median annual household income was $62,463.
