= Alexander Sample =

American Catholic prelate (born 1960)

His Excellency, The Most Reverend Alexander Sample
- Archbishop of Portland in Oregon
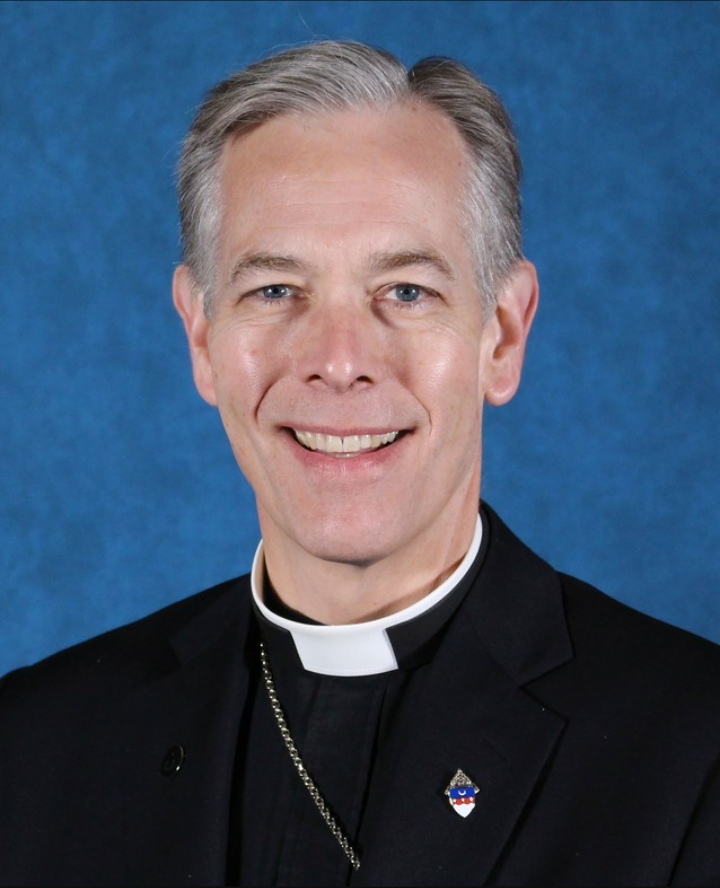
- Church: Catholic
- Archdiocese: Portland in Oregon
- Appointed: January 29, 2013
- Installed: April 2, 2013
- Predecessor: John George Vlazny
- Previous post: Bishop of Marquette (2006–2013)

Orders
- Ordination: June 1, 1990 by Mark Schmitt
- Consecration: January 25, 2006 by Adam Maida, James Henry Garland, and Mark Schmitt

Personal details
- Born: November 7, 1960 (age 65) Kalispell, Montana, US
- Education: Michigan Technological University (BS, MS); Pontifical College Josephinum; Pontifical University of St. Thomas Aquinas (JCL)
- Motto: Vultum Christi contemplari (Latin for 'To contemplate the face of Christ')
- Styles
- Reference style: His Excellency; The Most Reverend
- Spoken style: Your Excellency
- Religious style: Archbishop

Alexander King Sample (born November 7, 1960) is an American Catholic prelate who serves as archbishop of Portland in Oregon. He previously served as bishop of Marquette in Michigan from 2005 to 2013.

== Biography ==
=== Early life ===
Alexander King Sample was born on November 7, 1960, in Kalispell, Montana, to Alexander and Joyce (née Dory) Sample. His father was of Scottish heritage and his mother Polish. The younger Alexander Sample graduated from Bishop Gorman High School in Las Vegas, Nevada, in 1978. He attended Michigan Technological University (MTU) in Houghton, Michigan, where he obtained a Bachelor of Science degree in 1982 and a Master of Science degree in metallurgical engineering in 1984.

Interested in becoming a priest since the fourth grade, Sample decided to study for the priesthood after graduating from MTU, saying, "I knew I would never know peace until I explored the vocation to be a priest." He graduated in 1986 from the College of St. Thomas in St. Paul, Minnesota, and then entered the Pontifical College Josephinum in Columbus, Ohio.

=== Priesthood ===
Sample was ordained a priest of the Diocese of Marquette by Bishop Mark Schmitt on June 1, 1990. After his ordination, Sample had the following pastoral assignments in Michigan parishes:

- Parochial vicar of St. Peter Cathedral from 1990 to 1993
- Pastor of St. George in Bark River
- St. Michael in Perronville
- Sacred Heart in Schaffer

In 1994, Sample entered the Pontifical University of St. Thomas Aquinas (Angelicum), earning a Licentiate of Canon Law in 1996.

After returning to Marquette in 1996, Sample was named chancellor of the diocese and pastor of St. Christopher Parish in Marquette. He also served as a member of the college of consultors, as director of ministry personnel services and of ongoing formation of priests, and diocesan chaplain to the Knights of Columbus. Within the marriage tribunal, Sample served as judge, adjutant judicial vicar, defender of the bond, and promoter of justice. He was also director of the Bishop Baraga Association and vice-postulator of the cause of beatification for Bishop Frederic Baraga, a 19th-century missionary to Native Americans in the Upper Midwest.

=== Bishop of Marquette ===
On December 13, 2005, Sample was appointed the twelfth bishop of the Diocese of Marquette by Pope Benedict XVI. He received his episcopal consecration on January 25, 2006, from Cardinal Adam Maida, with Bishops James Garland and Mark Schmitt serving as co-consecrators. At the time of his consecration, Sample was the youngest Catholic bishop in the United States and the first to be born in the 1960s. He selected as his episcopal motto: "Vultum Christi contemplari", meaning "To contemplate the face of Christ".

On October 7, 2007, at the invitation of Archbishop Raymond Burke, Sample attended the Red Mass at the Cathedral Basilica of St. Louis, delivering the homily.

In July 2012, Sample ordained five seminarians to the diaconate, and ten new subdeacons. These new subdeacons include five from the United States for the Institute of Christ the King Sovereign Priest.

=== Archbishop of Portland ===
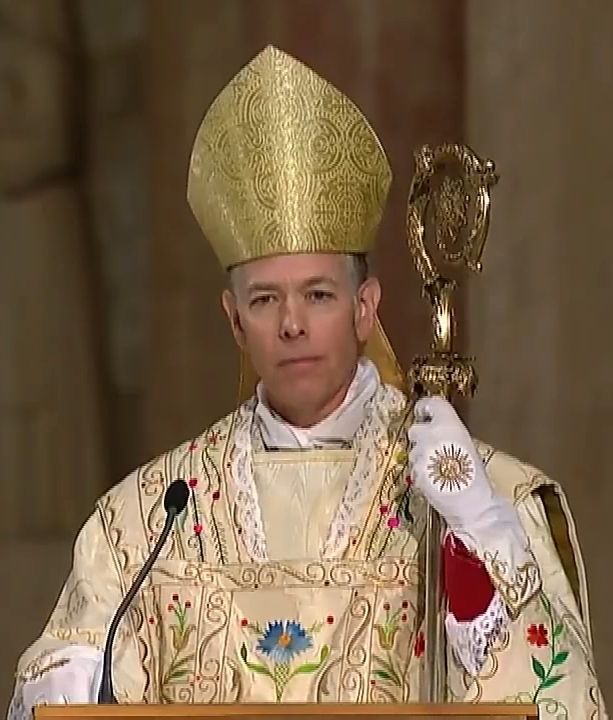
Archbishop Sample at the Basilica of the National Shrine of the Immaculate Conception in honor of the 10th anniversary of Summorum Pontificum, 2018

On January 29, 2013, Sample was appointed by Pope Benedict XVI as archbishop of the Archdiocese of Portland in Oregon, succeeding the retiring Archbishop John Vlazny. He was the last American residential bishop appointed during the pontificate of Benedict XVI. Sample was installed on April 2, 2013, at the Chiles Center Arena on the campus of the University of Portland.

In May 2018, Sample directed that Catholics attending Mass in the archdiocese must kneel after chanting the Lamb of God until they receive communion.

In August 2018, Sample acknowledged the history of sexual abuse crimes committed by clergy in the archdiocese, which he described as an "institutional and spiritual" failure, and issued an apology.

== Views ==
=== Abortion ===
In April 2009, Sample expressed his "disappointment and dismay" over the University of Notre Dame's decision to invite President Barack Obama to deliver its commencement speech and receive an honorary degree, given Obama's support of abortion. He added:

It saddens me beyond words that the great university named after Our Lady would bestow distinction and honor on a politician who would seek to expand threats to such innocent human life.

In March 2025, Archbishop Alexander Sample issued a formal statement in response to Oregon Governor Tina Kotek's proclamation of Abortion Provider Appreciation Day. He criticized the framing of the issue, stating:

And that’s why, no matter how loudly abortion is celebrated, something feels… off. The need to frame it as a social good, as a moral necessity, reveals the guilt just beneath the surface. If abortion were truly nothing, no one would need to justify it. No one would need to celebrate it. The fact that it must be ritualized as progress is itself an admission of its darkness.

=== Immigration ===
In December 2016, at a Mass celebrating the Feast of Our Lady of Guadalupe, Sample condemned racist and bigoted language used against minorities by Donald Trump in the 2016 US Presidential Election Campaign. He stated:

It does not matter to me from where you have come, when you came, or whether you have the proper documents or not. You are loved! You are loved by God and precious in his eyes. You are loved by Our Lady of Guadalupe. You are her special children, her little ones, and she will not abandon you.

=== Issues related to marriage and sexuality ===
In 2017, Sample decreed that Catholics in the archdiocese who are sexually active LGBT or divorced and civilly remarried (without a declaration of nullity) heterosexuals should not receive the eucharist. These individuals must first "sacramentally confess all serious sins with a firm purpose to change" before they can take communion.

In 2023, Sample released guidelines for the Portland archdiocese regarding gender and pronouns. He asked teachers not to use preferred pronouns. After a coalition of parents and teachers asked for a meeting to discuss, he closed down the Department of Catholic schools, which Sample claimed was unrelated and due to mismanagement by school officials.

=== Sexual abuse scandal ===
In August 2018, Sample expressed his shock and disappointment over the Pennsylvanian grand jury report on sexual abuse of minors by clergy. He stated:

These horrific revelations are particularly painful in light of what victims in our own archdiocese have suffered and the impact that sexual abuse has had on the church here in western Oregon. I am sorry beyond words for the harm that has been done.

== See also ==
- Catholic Church hierarchy
- Catholic Church in the United States
- Historical list of the Catholic bishops of the United States
- List of Catholic bishops of the United States
- Lists of patriarchs, archbishops, and bishops

Catholic Church titles
Preceded by John George Vlazny	Archbishop of Portland in Oregon; 2013–present	Incumbent
Preceded by James Henry Garland	Bishop of Marquette; 2006–2013	Succeeded by John Francis Doerfler
