= St. Peter Cathedral (Marquette, Michigan) =

Historic church in Michigan, United States

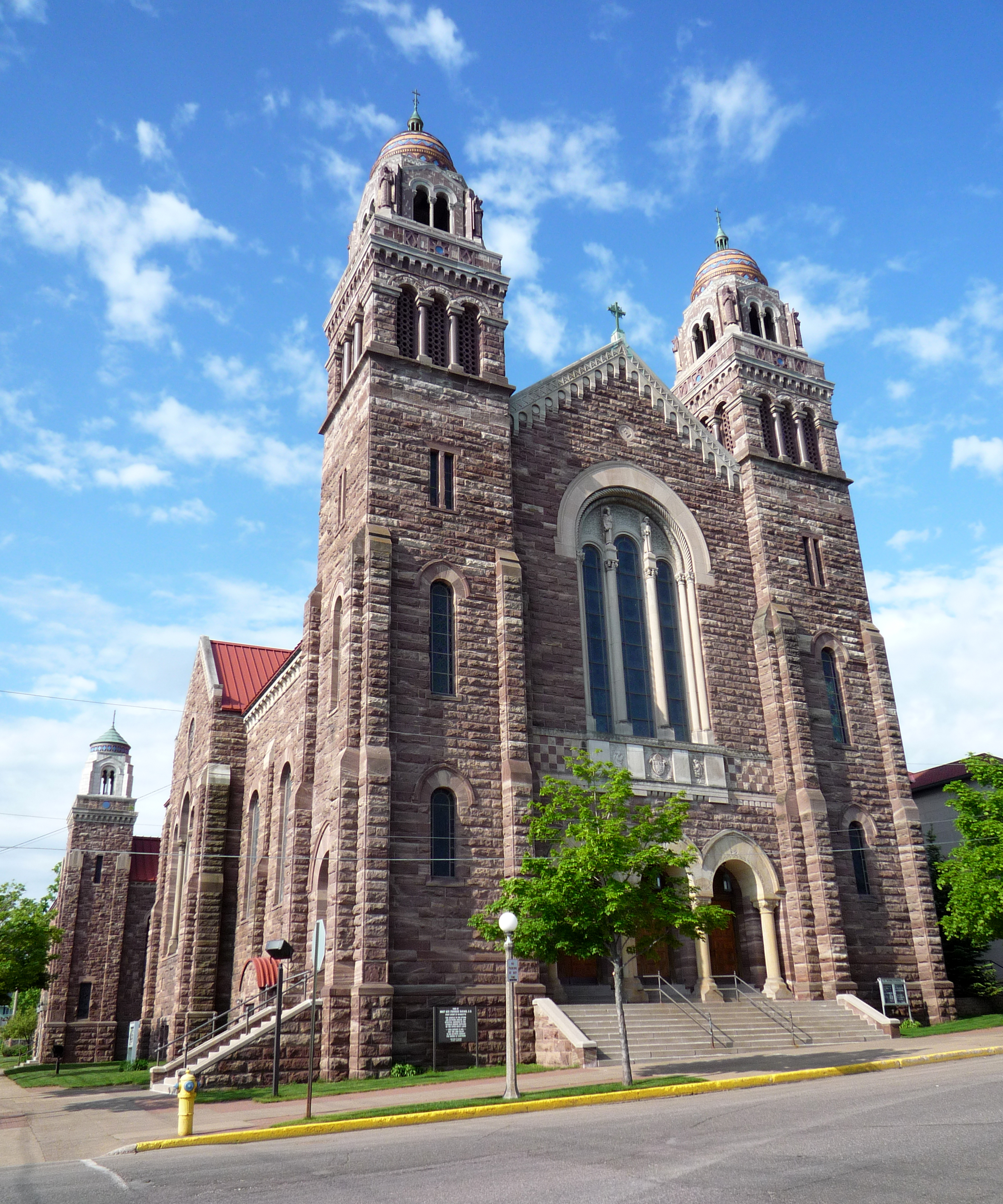
- St. Peter Cathedral - southwest view

- Location within Michigan
- 46°32′28″N 87°23′56″W
- Location: 311 West Baraga Avenue; Marquette, Michigan
- Country: United States
- Denomination: Roman Catholic Church

History
- Status: Cathedral

Architecture
- Groundbreaking: 1881
- Completed: 1890; post-fire restoration completed 1938

Administration
- Diocese: Marquette

Clergy
- Bishop: Most Rev. John Doerfler
- Rector: Rev. Brandon Oman
- St. Peter Cathedral
- U.S. National Register of Historic Places
- NRHP reference No.: 12000307
- Added to NRHP: May 30, 2012

St. Peter Cathedral is a Roman Catholic cathedral located on Baraga Avenue in Marquette, Michigan in the United States. As the mother church of the Diocese of Marquette, it is one of the most notable marks of Catholic presence in the Upper Peninsula.

== History ==
=== St. Peter's Church ===
During the first half of the 19th century, the few Catholics in Maquette were periodically visited by Jesuit priests from Sault Sainte Marie. At that time, all of Michigan was under the jurisdiction of the Diocese of Detroit.

Pope Pius IX in July 1853 erected the Vicariate Apostolic of Upper Michigan, covering the entire Upper Peninsula. He named Ireneus Frederic Baraga as the apostolic vicar. In October 1853, Baraga purchased a property in Marquette for the town's first church. Three years later, he sent Sebastian Duroc, a priest serving on Mackinac Island, to build the church and serve as its pastor. In 1857, Duroc constructed St. Peter's Church, which included his personal residence.

Also in 1857, the Vatican converted the Vicariate Apostolic of Upper Michigan to the Diocese of Sault Sainte Marie. By 1864, Baraga had decided that the see city for his diocese should be Marquette as it was now the populous community. The diocese began construction of a wooden frame building on a stone foundation. Baraga laid the cornerstone for the first St. Peter's Cathedral in 1866.

=== St. Peter's Cathedral ===
The diocese in 1873 built a bishop's residence at the back of the cathedral. In 1878, after the bishop of what was now Sault Sainte Marie and Marquette resigned, John C. Kenny was appointed rector of St. Peter's. However, the new bishop, Thomas Lawrence Noa, removed Kenny from his post the next year, causing anger in part of the congregation. St. Peter's was destroyed in an arson attack on October 2, 1879. Although never proven, it was suspected that the arsonist was upset over the Kenny dismissal.

The cornerstone for the second St. Peter's Cathedral was on June 19, 1881. When the basement of the new building was completed, the parish started celebrating mass there. The new St. Peter's Cathedral was consecrated in 1890. A few years later, a rectory was constructed next to the cathedral. This rectory was replaced by a new one in 1922, with a tunnel connecting it to the cathedral.

On June 24, 1935, fire broke out in the cathedral. A priest and custodian risked their lives to retrieve the sacred vessels from the tabernacle, escaping just before the roof collapsed. The building was gutted, with only the sandstone walls left standing.

The rebuilding of the cathedral started in 1936. During the planning phase, the diocese extended the nave and added a bishop's chapel to the structure. A new marble altar and cathedra were commissioned, along with new stations of the cross and stained glass windows. The diocese hired the sculptor Corrado Parducci to create the interior sculptures.

The third St. Peter's Cathedral was completed in 1938 and dedicated in 1939. In 1947, the cathedral was redecorated; a mural depicting Christ’s presentation of the keys to St. Peter was painted over the high altar. During the 1960s, the diocese made several changes to the cathedral to conform to liturgical changes of the Second Vatican Council. The communion rail was removed and the sanctuary remodeled.

The diocese undertook the first renovation of St. Peter's Cathedral in 1980. Walls were repainted and the lighting system upgraded. A major change was the conversation of the bishop's chapel to a Chapel of the Blessed Sacrament, where the eucharist would be stored in the tabernacle.The cathedral was listed on the National Register of Historic Places in 2012.In 2025, the diocese began a restoration of the two bell towers to ensure their structural stability and replaced the chairs in the choir loft.

== Burials ==
- Frederic Baraga
- Ignatius Mrak
- John Vertin
- Frederick Eis
- Francis Joseph Magner
- Thomas Lawrence Noa
- Mark Francis Schmitt

== Images ==
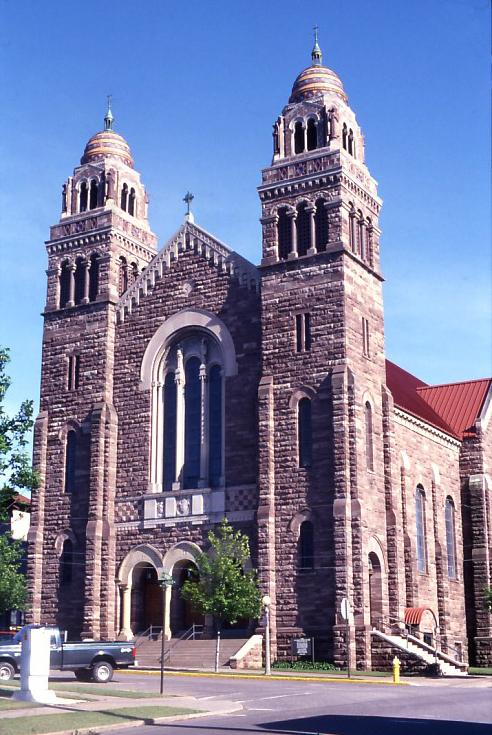
St. Peter Cathedral - southeast view

== See also ==
- List of Catholic cathedrals in the United States
- List of cathedrals in the United States
