= Roman Catholic Diocese of Marquette =

Ecclesiastical jurisdiction in Michigan, US

Coordinates: 46°32′28″N 87°23′56″W

Diocese of Marquette Diœcesis Marquettensis
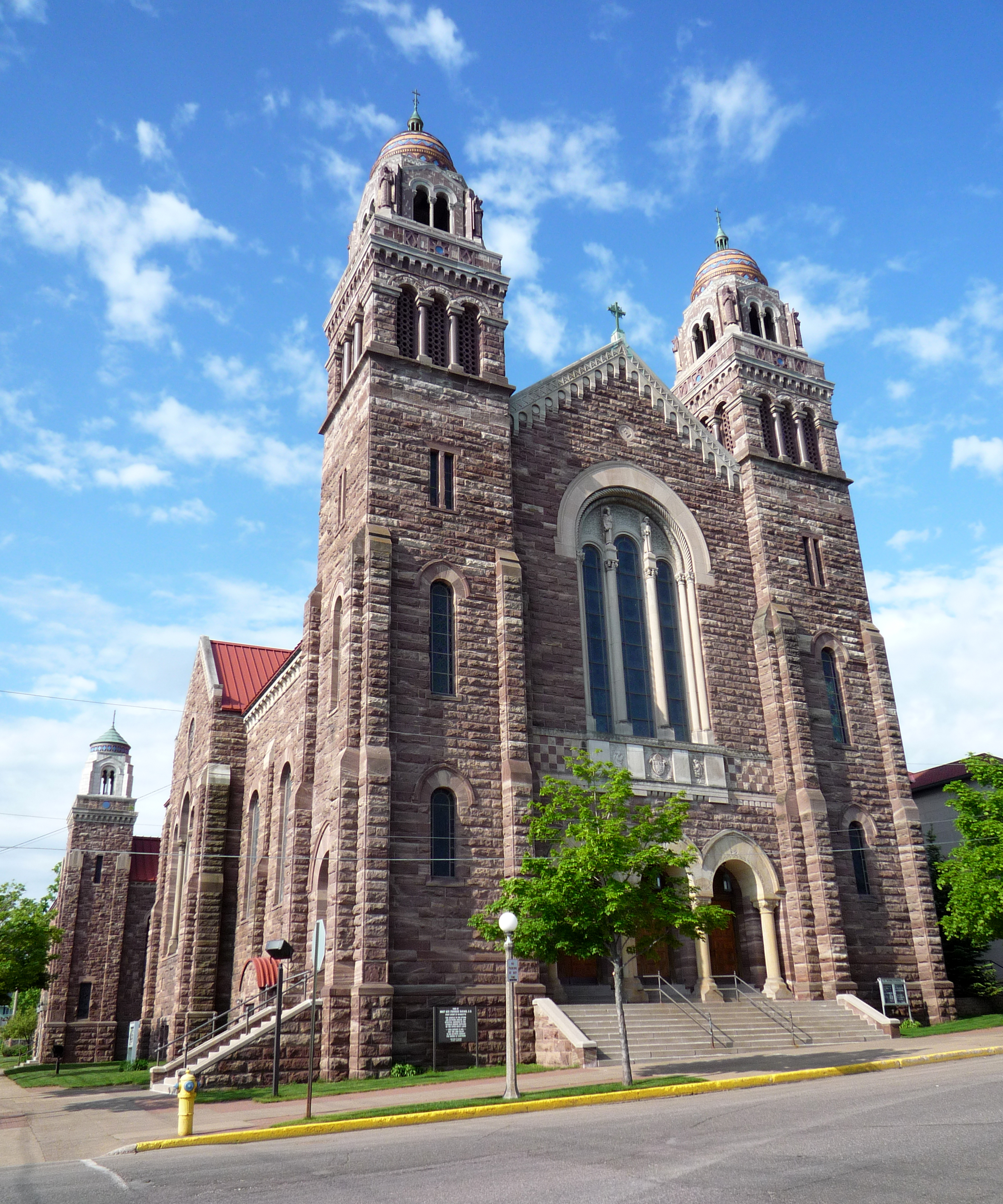
- St. Peter Cathedral

- Coat of arms

Location
- Country: United States
- Territory: Counties of Alger, Baraga, Chippewa, Delta, Dickinson, Gogebic, Houghton, Iron, Keweenaw, Luce, Mackinac, Marquette, Menominee, Ontonagon, and Schoolcraft
- Ecclesiastical province: Detroit

Statistics
- Area: 16,281 sq mi (42,170 km^{2})
- Population: Total; Catholics: (as of 2004); 317,616; 68,360 (21.5%)
- Parishes: 74

Information
- Denomination: Catholic
- Sui iuris church: Latin Church
- Rite: Roman Rite
- Established: July 29, 1853 (173 years ago)
- Cathedral: St. Peter Cathedral
- Patron saint: St. Peter

Current leadership
- Pope: Leo XIV
- Bishop: John Francis Doerfler
- Metropolitan Archbishop: Edward Weisenburger
- Bishops emeritus: James Henry Garland

Map
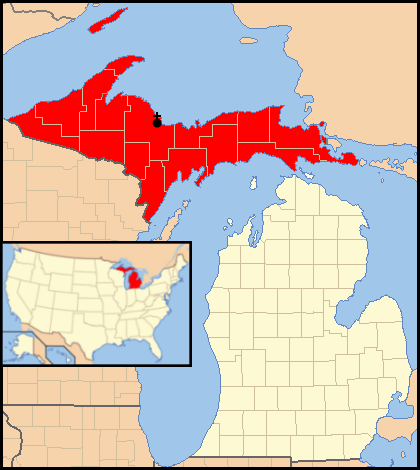

Website
- dioceseofmarquette.org

The Roman Catholic Diocese of Marquette (Latin: Diœcesis Marquettensis) is diocese of the Catholic Church, encompassing the Upper Peninsula region of Michigan in the United States. It is a suffragan diocese of the Archdiocese of Detroit. Its cathedral is St. Peter Cathedral in Marquette.

== Statistics ==
The Diocese of Marquette encompasses an area of 16,281 square miles (42,152 square kilometers). As of 2000, the number of registered Catholics in the diocese was 65,500. There were fifty-eight diocesan priests and 11 religious at 74 parishes and 23 missions. There were 10 parish grade schools. Sixty-three women religious were also in service to the diocese.

== History ==
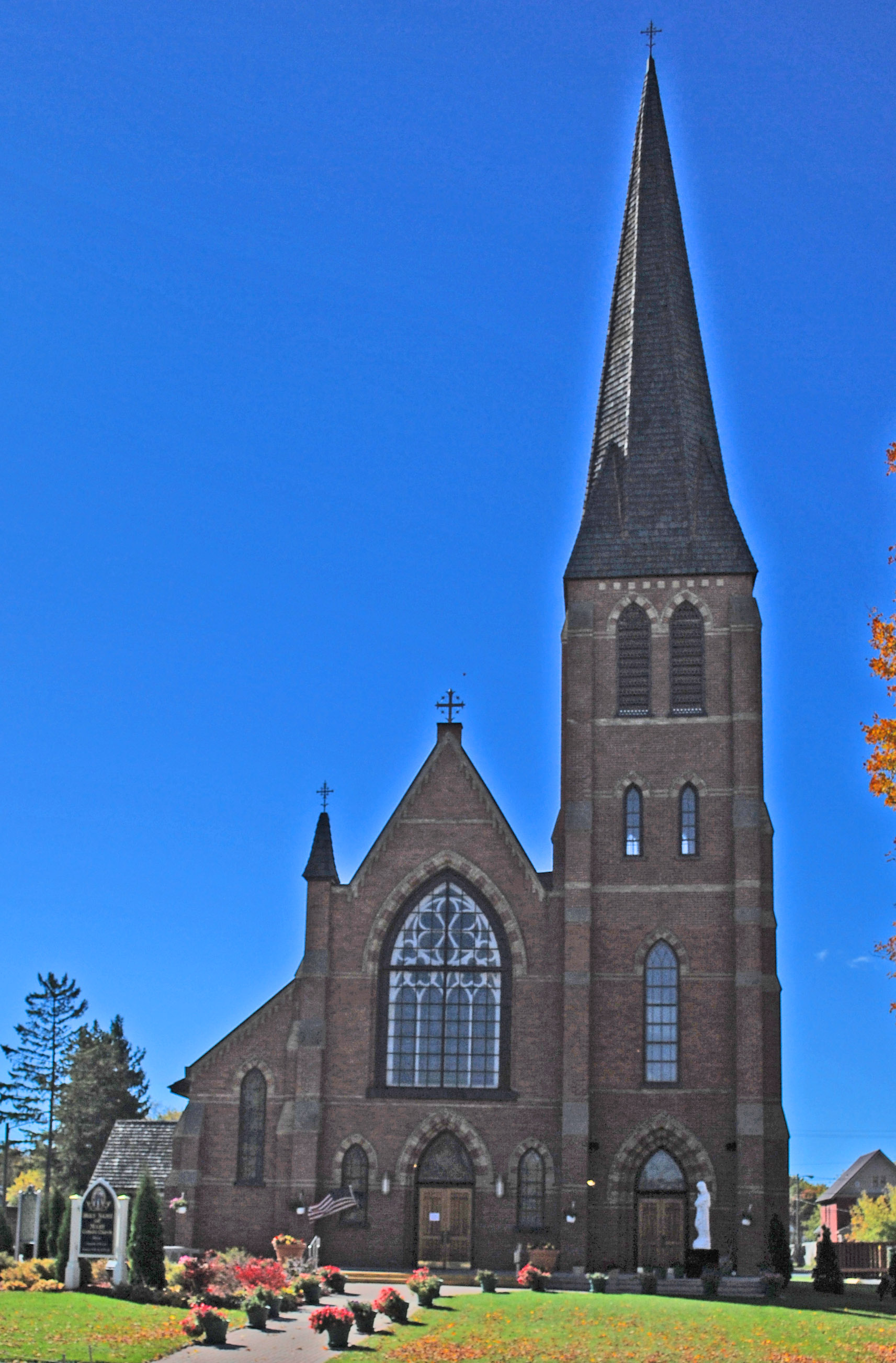
Holy Name of Mary Proto-Cathedral, Sault Ste. Marie, Michigan (2010)

=== 1700 to 1800 ===
During the 17th century, present-day Michigan was part of the French colony of New France. The Diocese of Quebec had jurisdiction over the few Catholics in the region. The first Catholic mass in the Upper Peninsula was celebrated in 1641 by the French missionary Isaac Jogues around present-day Sault Sainte Marie.

The first resident pastor in the Upper Peninsula was the French missionary Jacques Marquette, who arrived in 1668. Marquette founded Michigan's first European settlement, Sault Sainte Marie, and later founded St. Ignace, Michigan. Also in 1668, Marquette established the Sainte-Marie Mission in Sault Sainte Marie. Now called Holy Name of Mary Parish, it is the third-oldest Catholic parish in the United States.

In 1763, with the end of the French Indian War, France ceded its colonies in North America to Great Britain. The Michigan area became part of the British Province of Quebec, forbidden from settlement by American colonists. After the American Revolution ended in 1783, the Michigan region became part of the new United States. For Catholics, Michigan was now under the jurisdiction of the Archdiocese of Baltimore, which then comprised the entire country.

=== 1800 to 1865 ===
In 1808, Pope Pius VII erected the Diocese of Bardstown in Kentucky, with jurisdiction over the new Michigan Territory. In 1821, the pope erected the Diocese of Cincinnati, taking the Michigan Territory from the Diocese of Bardstown. Pope Gregory XVI formed the Diocese of Detroit in 1833, covering the entire Michigan Territory. Frederic Baraga settled at L'Anse in 1843, after forming Catholic missions in Wisconsin.

In 1853, Pope Pius IX created the Vicariate Apostolic of Upper Michigan, removing its territory from the Diocese of Detroit. In 1857, the pope converted the vicariate into the Diocese of Sault Sainte Marie and named Baraga as its first bishop.That same year, Baraga built a house in Marquette that served both as his residence in Marquette and as the first Catholic church in the community. Its church is the Holy Name of Mary Pro-Cathedral.

During this time, the area experienced a population explosion, as European immigrants were attracted to work in the copper and iron mines developed near Houghton, Ontonagon, and Marquette. Baraga had few priests to minister to his diocese, which included Native American inhabitants, French-Canadian settlers, and the new German and Irish immigrant miners. Difficulties in recruiting staff arose because of the many languages used in the diocese; while Baraga spoke eight languages fluently, he had trouble recruiting priests with equal skills. In 1864, Baraga laid the cornerstone for St. Peter's Church on his property in Marquette.

=== 1865 to 1900 ===
In 1865, recognizing the population growth in Marquette, the Vatican renamed the Diocese of Sault Sainte Marie as the Diocese of Sault Sainte Marie and Marquette.St. Peter's Church was completed in 1866.

Baraga died in 1868. That same year, Ignatius Mrak of Sault Saint Marie and Marquette was named bishop of the diocese by Pope Pius IX. Over the course of his tenure as bishop, the diocese saw slow development. Mrak increased the number of churches from 21 to 27 and the number of priests from 15 to 20. At the same time, a depression in the Copper Country industry lead to a significant decline in the Catholic population. Two prominent schools, one in Sault Ste. Marie and the other in Hancock closed during his first year as bishop. In 1874, Mrak placed a church in Hancock under interdict after the congregation refused to accept their new pastor. St. John the Baptist Church was erected in Menominee in 1875. Mrak resigned as bishop of Sault Sainte Marie and Marquette in 1879.

Pope Leo XIII in 1879 appointed John Vertin from the diocese as its next bishop. A few weeks after his consecration, St. Peter Cathedral in Marquette was destroyed by fire. The fire was allegedly an act of arson by some parishioners angry over the removal of the cathedral's pastor, John Kenny. Vertin rebuilt the cathedral, laying the cornerstone in 1881 and consecrating the new building in 1890. The main altar was a gift from Vertin's father and a side altar was donated by Vertin's brother-in-law. Also in 1890, Vertin opened St. Mary's Hospital in Marquette, to be operated by the Sisters of the Third Order of St. Francis from Peoria, Illinois. It is today UP Health Systems - Marquette.

In 1889, Vertin convoked a conference with the diocese's priests, which created an infirm priests' fund and required all Catholic children to attend Catholic school. Over the course of his 20 years as bishop, Vertin oversaw an increase in the diocese's Catholic population from 20,000 to 60,000, the number of churches from 27 to 56, and the number of priests from 20 to 62. After 20 years as bishop, Vertin died in 1899.In 1899, Frederick Eis was appointed the fourth bishop of Sault Sainte Marie and Marquette by Leo XIII.

=== 1900 to 1950 ===
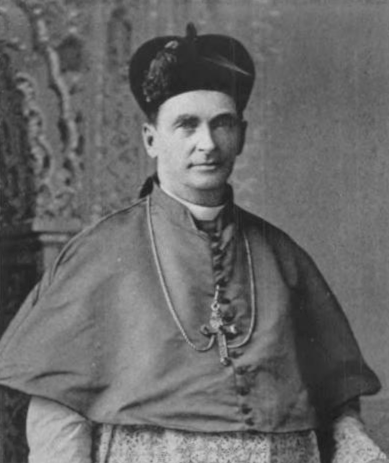
Bishop Eis (1900)

During Eis' 23-year tenure as bishop, he led the diocese through the nationalist controversies within the American Catholic community, and presided over the founding of several charitable institutions. In 1914, the Sisters of the Third Order of St. Francis assumed ownership of Delta County Hospital in Escanaba,, which they renamed St. Francis Hospital. It is today OSF St. Francis Hospital.Holy Family Orphan Home was opened in Marquette in 1915

Eis was known for helping prospective seminarians and women wanting to join religious orders. Els retired as bishop of Sault Sainte Marie and Marquette in 1922; Bishop Paul Nussbaum of the Diocese of Corpus Christi was appointed as his successor by Pope Pius XI that same year. Nussbaum died in 1935.

Auxiliary Bishop Joseph C. Plagens of Detroit replaced Nussbaum in 1935. In 1937, the pope suppressed the title of Diocese of Sault Sainte Marie and Marquette, erecting the Diocese of Marquette in its place.

In 1938, a transfer of a priest broke into violence. Plagens had ordered the transfer of Simon Borkowski, pastor of St. Barbara's Parish in Vulcan, Michigan, to a seminary in Wisconsin. However, Borkowski had refused to go, instead remaining inside his church with 20 supporters picketing outside. One day, a group of 60 men arrived at St. Barbara's, pushed past the picketers, and forced Borkowski out of the building. The newly appointed pastor, Erasmus Dooley, was allowed to enter. However, a group of 100 Borkowski supporters soon arrived and a full-scale brawl erupted. In the end, Dooley left the church and Borkowski re-entered it.

In 1940, Pope Pius XII named Plagens as bishop of the Diocese of Grand Rapids and replace him in Marquette with Francis Joseph Magner from the Archdiocese of Chicago.During his six-year tenure, Magner provided attention to the mission parishes of the diocese, established the diocesan newspaper and created seven catechetical schools. Magner died in 1947. To replace Magner, Pius XII appointed Coadjutor Bishop Thomas Lawrence Noa of the Diocese of Sioux City later in 1947.

=== 1950 to 2000 ===
Noa in 1952 opened the cause, or initiative, for the canonization of Baraga. In 1953, on the 100th anniversary of the Vicariate Apostolic of Upper Michigan, a centennial mass was held in Marquette. In 1958, Noa ordered that Catholics in his diocese not attend meetings of Moral Re-armament, an international spiritual association. Noa cited its dangers to Catholic faith. Noa retired as bishop of Marquette in 1968.

In 1968, Pope Paul VI appointed Auxiliary Bishop Charles Salatka of Grand Rapids as bishop of Marquette. Facing a large financial deficit, Salatka was forced to close two-thirds of the diocesan schools. In 1972, Salatka established a tribunal as a start of the canonization process for Baraga. Salatka was named by Paul VI as archbishop of the Archdiocese of Oklahoma City in 1977.

To replace Salatka, the pope named Auxiliary Bishop Mark Schmitt of the Diocese of Green Bay as the new bishop of Marquette. As bishop, Schmitt founded the Lay Ministries Leadership School to prepare lay parishioners for leadership roles in parishes. He also create bachelor's and master's degree programs in pastoral studies.After Schmitt retired as bishop of Marquette in 1992, Pope John Paul II named Auxiliary Bishop James Garland of Cincinnati as the next bishop of that diocese.

=== 2000 to present ===
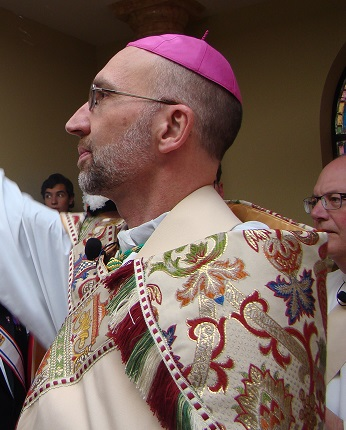
Bishop Doerfler (2014)

In 2000, the diocese began celebrating the Jubilee Year 2000. Events included a diocesan-wide celebration of the Sacrament of Confirmation at the Superior Dome in Marquette. At that ceremony, 656 youths received the confirmation. An estimated 2,500 people attended a liturgical celebration in 2000, at the Mattson Lower Harbor Park, also in Marquette. Garland retired as bishop of Marquette in 2005.

In 2005, Alexander Sample of Maquette was appointed its twelfth bishop by Pope Benedict XVI. In 2012, Sample ordained five seminarians to the diaconate, and ten new subdeacons. These new subdeacons include five from the United States for the Institute of Christ the King Sovereign Priest. That same year, Benedict XVI declared Baraga as venerable. In 2013, Pope Francis named Sample as archbishop of the Archdiocese of Portland. The pope appointed Monsignor John Doerfler of Green Bay as the next bishop of Marquette.

The US Conference of Catholic Bishops (USCCB) in 2019 gave the diocese permission to advance the canonization cause of Francis C. Houle of Escanaba. A devout Catholic layman who spoke at many church gatherings, Houle developed in 1993 wounds on his hands that many saw as stigmata. Several miraculous healings were attributed to him.

In 2021, the diocese announced a policy that gay, non-binary and transgender individuals needed to "repent" before they could receive baptism, confirmation, or communion. It was believed to be the first diocese in the United States to adopt such a policy.The diocese in 2022 released a report on the Holy Family Orphan Home in Marquette, acknowledging that many of the staff in that facility had not been sensitve to the culture and language of its Native American residents.

As of 2025, Doerfler is the bishop of Marquette.

=== Sex abuse ===
In 1987, Terrence Healy, pastor of St. John Church near Hartland, was charged with second-degree criminal sexual conduct, based on accusations from a 15-year-old boy. Healy was convicted and sentenced to four-and-a-half years in prison and was laicized in 1992.

In 2002, Bishop Garland confronted another priest, Raymond Hoefgen, with allegations from two sisters. The women said that Hoefgen had fondled them during the 1960s when they were eight or nine years old during play wrestling at the children's home. Hoefgen admitted his guilt and was placed under senior priest status with restrictions. The diocese offered to pay for counseling for the victims.

In January 2020, Michigan Attorney General Dana Nessel charged former priest Gary Jacobs with eight counts of first-degree criminal sexual conduct and two counts of second-degree criminal sexual conduct. The investigation showed that in 1982 a priest in the diocese found Polaroid pictures of Jacobs having oral sex with a minor. However, the priest did not report this to the diocese until 1988, when Jacobs was sent away for treatment of alcohol dependency. He never returned to ministry and was laicized in 2010. Jacobs was later accused of sexually molesting two teenagers and one child under age 13. In May 2021, he was sentenced to at least eight years in prison.

== Bishops ==
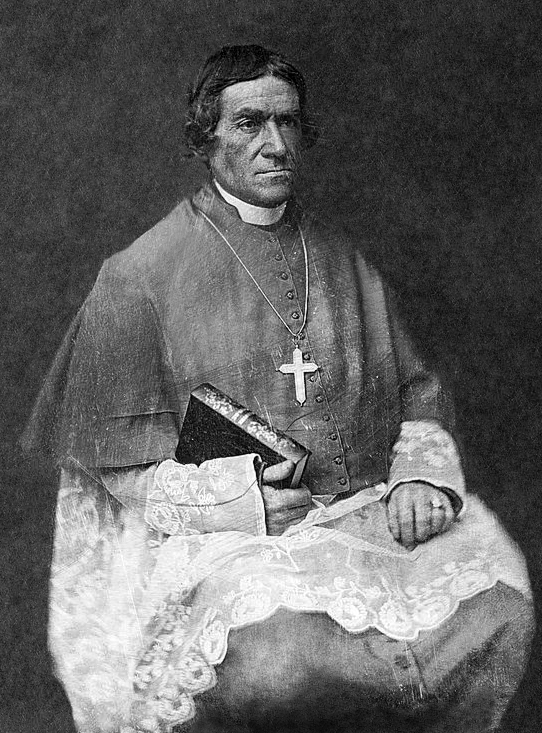
Bishop Baraga (between 1853 and 1860)

=== Bishop of Sault Sainte Marie ===
Ireneus Frederic Baraga (1853 to 1868)

=== Bishops of Sault Sainte Marie and Marquette ===
1. Ireneus Frederic Baraga (1853 to 1868)
2. Ignatius Mrak (1868 to 1879)
3. John Vertin (1879 to 1899)
4. Frederick Eis (1899 to 1922)
5. Paul Joseph Nussbaum (1922 to 1935)

=== Bishops of Marquette ===
1. Joseph Casimir Plagens (1935 to 1940)
2. Francis Joseph Magner (1940 to 1947)
3. Thomas Lawrence Noa (1947 to 1968)
4. Charles Salatka (1968 to 1977)
5. Mark Francis Schmitt (1978 to 1992)
6. James Henry Garland (1992 to 2005)
7. Alexander King Sample (2005 to 2013)
8. John Francis Doerfler (2014 to present)

=== Other diocesan priests who became bishops ===
- John Stariha, appointed Bishop of Lead in 1902
- Joseph Gabriel Pinten, appointed Bishop of Superior in 1921 and later Bishop of Grand Rapids
- Edmund Szoka, appointed Bishop of Gaylord in 1971 and later Archbishop of Detroit, president of the Prefecture for the Economic Affairs of the Holy See, and president of the Pontifical Commission for Vatican City State and Governatorate of Vatican City State (elevated to cardinal in 1988)

== Education ==
As of 2026, the Diocese of Marquette has eight pre-8 schools and one high school, Holy Name High School in Escanaba.
