= Charles Salatka =

American prelate (1918-2003)

His Excellency, The Most Reverend Charles Salatka
- Archbishop of Oklahoma City titular bishop of Cariana
- Church: Roman Catholic Church
- See: Archdiocese of Oklahoma City
- In office: December 15, 1977 to November 24, 1992
- Predecessor: John R. Quinn
- Successor: Eusebius J. Beltran
- Other posts: Auxiliary Bishop of Grand Rapids; 1962 to 1968; Bishop of Marquette; 1968 to 1977

Orders
- Ordination: February 24, 1945 by Francis J. Haas
- Consecration: March 6, 1962 by Egidio Vagnozzi

Personal details
- Born: February 26, 1918 Grand Rapids, Michigan, US
- Died: March 17, 2003 (aged 85) Oklahoma City, Oklahoma, US
- Education: St. Joseph's Seminary; Catholic University of America
- Motto: Veni sancte spiritus (Come holy spirit)

Styles of Charles Salatka
- Reference style: The Most Reverend
- Spoken style: Your Excellency
- Religious style: Monsignor
- Posthumous style: none

Charles Alexander Kazimieras Salatka (February 26, 1918 – March 17, 2003) was an American Catholic prelate who served as Archbishop of Oklahoma City from 1977 to 1992. He was the first American Catholic bishop of Lithuanian descent. Salatka previously served as Bishop of Marquette from 1968 to 1977 and as an auxiliary bishop for the Diocese of Grand Rapids from 1962 to 1968.

== Biography ==
=== Early life ===
Charles Salatka was born on February 26, 1918, in Grand Rapids, Michigan, the son of Charles Anthony and Mary (Balun) Salatka. Anthony was a sander at a local factory. At age 14, Salatka started attending St. Joseph's Seminary in Grand Rapids. After finishing there, he traveled to Washington D.C. to enter the Catholic University of America.

=== Priesthood ===
Salatka was ordained a priest by Bishop Francis Haas for the Diocese of Grand Rapids on February 24, 1945. After his ordination, Salatka was sent to Rome to study, earning two advanced degrees. He became the first pastor of St. Michael's Parish in Coopersville in 1950. In 1959, he was given the title of monsignor.

=== Auxiliary Bishop of Grand Rapids ===
On December 9, 1961, Pope John XXIII appointed Salatka as an auxiliary bishop of the Diocese of Grand Rapids and titular bishop of Cariana. He was consecrated in Grand Rapids by Cardinal Egidio Vagnozzi on March 6, 1962. Salatka was the first American bishop of Lithuanian descent.

=== Bishop of Marquette ===
On January 10, 1968, Pope Paul VI appointed Salatka as bishop of the Diocese of Marquette . He was installed on March 25, 1968. Facing a large financial deficit, Salaka was forced to closed two thirds of the schools in the diocese.

In September 1972, Salatka established a tribunal as a start of the canonization process for Frederic Baraga, an early bishop of what was then the Diocese of Sault Sainte Marie and Marquette in Michigan.

=== Archdiocese of Oklahoma City ===
Pope Paul VI appointed Salatka as archbishop of the Archdiocese of Oklahoma City on October 11, 1977. He was installed on December 15, 1977. He founded the Office of Hispanic Ministry in the 1970s and learned to speak Spanish at age 68 so that he could celebrate mass in that language.

On October 3, 1981, Salatka celebrated a funeral mass in Oklahoma City for Stanley Rother, a priest from the diocese. Rother was murdered by three assassins, considered to be working for a right wing group, on July 28, 1981, while on a mission in Guatemala. Salatka had recalled Rother to Oklahoma in January 1981 due to threats on his life. However, Rother persuaded him to allow his return to Guatemala. On September 23, 2017, Rother was beatified.

=== Retirement and legacy ===
Pope John Paul II accepted Salatka's resignation as Archbishop of Oklahoma City on November 24, 1992. Charles Salatka died in Oklahoma City on March 17, 2003.

In May 2003, the Archdiocese of Oklahoma settled a sexual abuse lawsuit that was filed in 1999. The plaintiff Casey Johnson claimed that he was sexually molested three times as a minor during the 1990s by James Rapp, a priest at Assumption Parish in Duncan, Oklahoma. Rapp had been accused of sexually abusing children at a Catholic junior high school in Jackson, Michigan in the 1980s. After over eight months of treatment, Salatka approved his transfer to the Archdiocese of Oklahoma, where he abused Johnson. Rapp was convicted of child sexual abuse in 1999 and sentenced to 40 years in state prison.

Catholic Church titles
Preceded by John R. Quinn	Archbishop of Oklahoma City; 1977–1993	Succeeded by Eusebius J. Beltran
Preceded by Thomas Lawrence Noa	Bishop of Marquette; 1968–1977	Succeeded by Mark Francis Schmitt
