= Plagens =

Plagens is a surname. Notable people with the surname include:

- Joseph C. Plagens (1880–1943), Polish-born American Roman Catholic bishop
- Peter Plagens (born 1941), American artist, art critic, and novelist
