= Frederick Eis =

German-born prelate

His Excellency, The Right Reverend Frederick Eis
- Bishop of Sault Sainte Marie-Marquette; Titular Bishop of Bita
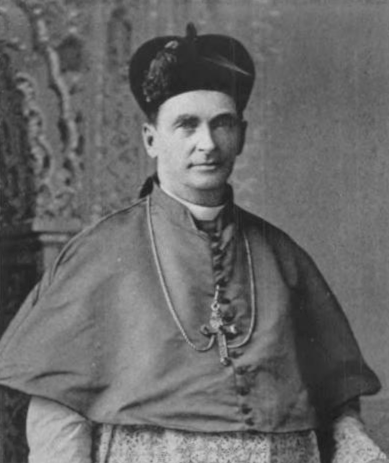
- Church: Roman Catholic Church
- See: Diocese of Sault Sainte Marie-Marquette
- In office: August 20, 1899 to July 8, 1922
- Predecessor: John Vertin
- Successor: Paul Joseph Nussbaum

Orders
- Ordination: October 30, 1870 by Ignatius Mrak
- Consecration: August 20, 1899 by Frederick Katzer

Personal details
- Born: January 20, 1843 Arbach, Rhine Province, Kingdom of Prussia
- Died: May 5, 1926 (aged 83) Marquette, Michigan, US
- Education: St. Francis Seminary; College of Jolliette
- Motto: Unum est necessarium (There is need of only one thing)

Frederick Eis (January 20, 1843 – May 5, 1926) was a German-born prelate of the Roman Catholic Church. He served as bishop of the Diocese of Sault Sainte Marie-Marquette in the Upper Peninsula of Michigan from 1899 to 1922.

== Biography ==
=== Early life ===
Frederick Eis was born in Arbach, then in the Rhine Province of the Kingdom of Prussia, part of the German Empire (present day Germany). He was the youngest of four children of William Eis and Catherine Dietrich. When Eis was age 12, his family emigrated to the United States in 1855. They settled first in Calvary, Wisconsin, then Minnesota and finally in Rockland, Michigan. Eis was taught Latin and French by a missionary priest, Martin Fox.

In 1861, Eis began his studies for the priesthood at St. Francis Seminary in Milwaukee, Wisconsin. Due to the American Civil War, Bishop Frederic Baraga sent Eis to study philosophy and theology instead at the College of Joliette in Joliette, Quebec. During his final years at Joliette, he taught English, mathematics and commerce.

=== Priesthood ===
Eis was ordained a priest by Bishop Ignatius Mrak on October 30, 1870, for the Diocese of Sault Sainte Marie and Marquette. After his ordination, Eis served in the following parishes in Michigan:

- Rector of St. Peter Cathedral in Marquette (1870 to 1873)
- Pastor of Sacred Heart in Calumet, (1873 to 1874)
- Pastor of St. Anne in Hancock (1874 to 1880)
- Pastor at St. Paul in Negaunee (1880 to 1890). While at St. Paul, he reduced the parish's debt and built a school. He was forced to resign in 1890 due to health problems.

For the next five years, to improve his health, Eis spent his winters in California and Colorado, returning to Michigan in the summer. After his health improved, he was appointed pastor of St. Sebastian Parish in Bessemer, Michigan, in 1894, then moved in 1895 to Guardian Angels Parish in Crystal Falls, Michigan, to serve as pastor. During this period, Eis served as the inspector of the diocesan schools. After the death of Bishop John Vertin, Eis served as diocesan administrator.

=== Bishop of Sault Sainte Marie and Marquette ===
On June 7, 1899, Eis was appointed the fourth bishop of Sault Sainte Marie and Marquette by Pope Leo XIII. He received his consecration on August 20, 1899, from Archbishop Frederick Katzer at St. Peter Cathedral.

During Eis' 23-year tenure as bishop, he led the diocese through the nationalist controversies within the American Catholic community, and founded several charitable institutions and hospitals. He was known for being helpful to men wanting to enter seminary and women wanting to join religious orders. In 1900, Eis travelled to Rome, meeting with Leo XIII at the Vatican.

=== Retirement and legacy ===
On July 8, 1922, Pope Pius XI accepted Eis' resignation as bishop of Sault Sainte Marie and Marquette and appointed him as titular bishop of Bita and an assistant at the pontifical throne.

Frederick Eis died in Marquette on May 5, 1926, at age 83. He is buried in the bishops' crypt at St. Peter Cathedral.
