= Czeszewo =

Czeszewo may refer to:

- Czeszewo, Wągrowiec County, Poland
- Czeszewo, Września County, Poland
