= John Stariha =

Catholic bishop (1845–1915)

His Excellency, The Right Reverend John Stariha
- Bishop of Lead titular bishop of Antipatris
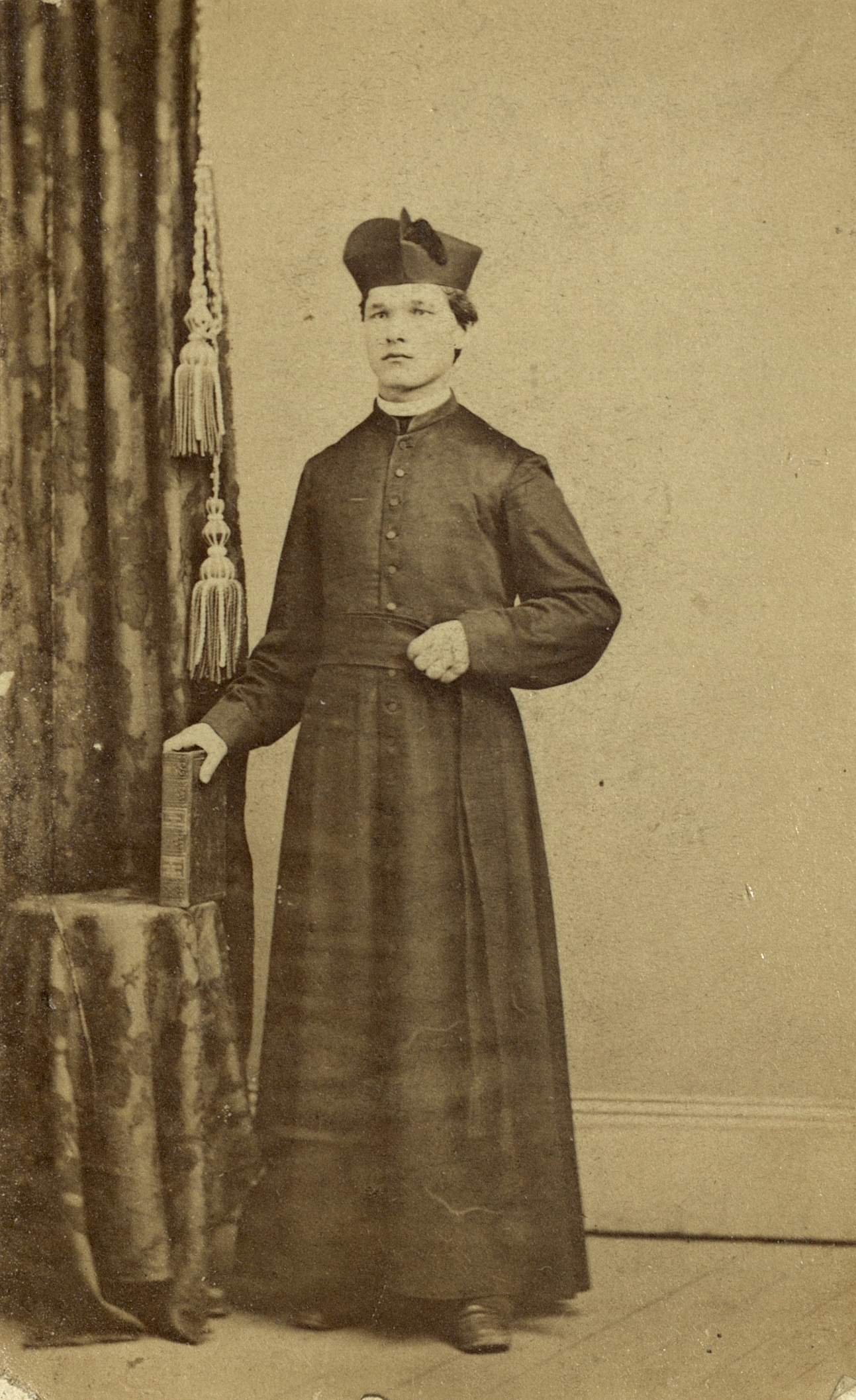
- Church: Catholic Church
- Diocese: Diocese of Lead
- Appointed: July 21, 1902
- Term ended: March 29, 1909
- Predecessor: Office established
- Successor: Joseph Francis Busch

Orders
- Ordination: September 19, 1869 by Ignatius Mrak
- Consecration: October 28, 1902 by John Ireland

Personal details
- Born: May 12, 1845 Semič, Slovenia
- Died: November 28, 1915 (aged 70) Ljubljana, Slovenia
- Education: Saint Francis de Sales Seminary

John Nepomucene Stariha (May 12, 1845 – November 28, 1915) was a Slovenian-born American prelate of the Catholic Church. He was the first bishop of Lead in South Dakota, serving from 1902 to 1909.

== Biography ==
=== Early life ===
John Stariha was born on May 12, 1845, in Semič in the Duchy of Carniola (present-daySlovenia), the son of John and Anna (née Judnic) Stariha. He received his early education in Novo Mesto in Carniola, but his studies were interrupted in 1866 when he was drafted into the Imperial Austrian Army. He served in the army for seven months and took part at the Battle of Custoza in Venetzia on June 24, 1866. He was awarded a silver medal for bravery. Stariha later deserted the army, fleeing to the United States.

Stariha arrived in New York City in May 1867 and then headed west to Wisconsin. After briefly working as a farmhand to earn money, he was encouraged by his fellow Slovene and former schoolmate, Reverend John Vertin, to become a priest. Stariha then entered Saint Francis de Sales Seminary in St. Francis, Wisconsin. He completed his theological studies there.

=== Priesthood ===
Stariha was ordained a priest by Bishop Ignatius Mrak for the Diocese of Sault Sainte Marie and Marquette on September 19, 1869, in Marquette, Michigan. His first assignment was as an assistant pastor at Saint Paul's Parish in Negaunee, Michigan, where he remained for two years.

Stariha came to the Diocese of Saint Paul in September 1871 and served for nine months in Marystown, Minnesota. In June 1872, he was appointed pastor of St. Joseph's Parish in Red Wing, Minnesota, and the surrounding missions. During his tenure, Stariha built a new church and opened a parochial school to accommodate the growing parish. He received a pardon from Austro-Hungarian Emperor Franz Joseph I in 1879 for deserting the army so that he could visit Slovenia.

Stariha remained in Red Wing until January 1884, when he was called to organize St. Francis de Sales Parish in Saint Paul, Minnesota for German-speaking immigrants. He built a church, rectory, parochial school, and convent during his time there. In addition to his pastoral duties, he was named vicar general of the Archdiocese of St. Paul and Minneapolis in December 1897.

=== Bishop of Lead ===
On July 21, 1902, Stariha was appointed by Pope Leo XIII to be the first bishop of the newly created Diocese of Lead in South Dakota. The diocese covered the portion of South Dakota west of the Missouri River. Upon receiving the news, he told a Saint Paul newspaper: "The news that I had been made a bishop was wholly unexpected and came as a surprise to me...I have never craved for this position and if I can help it I will not go." Nevertheless, he received his episcopal consecration on October 28, 1902, from Archbishop John Ireland, with Bishops Joseph Cotter and James McGolrick serving as co-consecrators.

During his seven years as bishop, Stariha increased the number of priests in the diocese from 17 to 25 and the number of parishes and missions from 25 to 53. Due to poor health, he moved from his official residence in Lead to Hot Springs, South Dakota in 1908.

=== Retirement and legacy ===
When his health failed to improve, Stariha submitted his resignation as bishop of Lead on March 29, 1909. It was accepted the following month. He was given the titular see of Antipatris by Pope Pius X.

Stariha retired to his native Slovenia in May 1909, residing in Ljubljana. John Stariha died in Ljubljana from apoplexy on November 28, 1915, at age 70.

Catholic Church titles
Preceded by None	Bishop of Lead/Rapid City; 1902–1909	Succeeded by Joseph Francis Busch
