= James Henry Garland =

American Roman Catholic bishop (born 1931)

His Excellency, The Most Reverend James Henry Garland
- Bishop Emeritus of Marquette
- Church: Roman Catholic
- Diocese: Marquette
- Appointed: October 6, 1992
- Installed: November 11, 1992
- Retired: December 13, 2005
- Predecessor: Mark Francis Schmitt
- Successor: Alexander King Sample
- Previous posts: Auxiliary Bishop of Cincinnati (1984–1992)

Orders
- Ordination: August 15, 1959 by Karl Joseph Alter
- Consecration: July 25, 1984 by Daniel Edward Pilarczyk, Nicholas Elko, and Edward A. McCarthy

Personal details
- Born: December 13, 1931 (age 94) Wilmington, Ohio, U.S.
- Education: Ohio State University; Athenaeum of Ohio; Catholic University of America
- Motto: Charity, mercy, justice

Styles of James Henry Garland
- Reference style: His Excellency; The Most Reverend
- Spoken style: Your Excellency
- Religious style: Bishop

James Henry Garland (born December 13, 1931) is an American prelate of the Roman Catholic Church. Garland served as bishop of the Diocese of Marquette in Michigan from 1992 to 2005 and as an auxiliary bishop of the Archdiocese of Cincinnati in Ohio from 1984 to 1992.

== Biography ==
=== Early life and education ===
James Garland was born on December 13, 1931, to a farm family in Wilmington, Ohio. He has four brothers and two sisters. In 1953, Garland graduated from Ohio State University with a Bachelor of Education degree. That same year, he began seminary studies, graduating from Mount Saint Mary's Seminary of the West in Cincinnati, Ohio, with a Master of Education degree in 1960. In 1965, Garland received a Master of Social Work degree from the Catholic University of America in Washington, D.C.

=== Priesthood ===
On August 15, 1959, Garland was ordained a priest in Cincinnati by Archbishop Karl Alter for the Archdiocese of Cincinnati. After his ordination, Garland was posted to several parishes in the archdiocese. He also directed the Catholic Charities offices in Springfield, Ohio, and Dayton, Ohio, and then the archdiocesan Office of Catholic Charities.

=== Auxiliary bishop of Cincinnati ===
On June 2, 1984, Pope John Paul II named Garland as the titular bishop of Garriana and as an auxiliary bishop of Cincinnati. He was consecrated on July 25, 1984, at the Cathedral Basilica of St. Peter in Chains in Cincinnati by Archbishop Daniel Pilarczyk. The co-consecrators were Archbishops Nicholas Elko and Edward McCarthy.

While auxiliary bishop, Garland directed the archdiocesan Departments of Community Services and Pastoral Services.

=== Bishop of Marquette ===
On October 6, 1992, John Paul II appointed Garland as the eleventh bishop of Marquette. He was installed on November 11, 1992

During this time, the diocese celebrated the Jubilee Year 2000. Events included a diocesan-wide celebration of the sacrament of confirmation at the Superior Dome in Marquette, Michigan, at which 656 youths received the sacrament. An estimated 2,500 people attended a liturgical celebration on August 20 at the Mattson Lower Harbor Park, also in Marquette.

Garland was a member of the Administrative Committee of the United States Conference of Catholic Bishops. He served as chair of the Committee for the Campaign for Human Development from November 1992 to November 1995, and as chair of the bishops of Region VI from November 1995 to November 1997.

== Retirement ==
On December 13, 2005, John Paul II accepted Garland's letter of resignation as bishop of Marquette. He was replaced by Bishop Alexander K. Sample.

After his retirement, Garland served for two years as executive director of the Bishop Baraga Association. He also wrote columns for The U.P. Catholic, presided at confirmations and other events and celebrated mass regularly at the Cathedral Parish and other parishes of the diocese.

== See also ==
- Catholic Church hierarchy
- Catholic Church in the United States
- Historical list of the Catholic bishops of the United States
- List of Catholic bishops of the United States
- Lists of patriarchs, archbishops, and bishops

== Episcopal succession ==
Catholic Church titles
Preceded by –	Bishop Emeritus of Marquette; 2005–Present	Succeeded by –
Preceded by Mark Francis Schmitt	Bishop of Marquette; 1992–2005	Succeeded by Alexander King Sample
Preceded by –	Auxiliary Bishop of Cincinnati; 1984–1992	Succeeded by –
