= John Francis Doerfler =

American Catholic prelate (born 1964)

His Excellency, The Most Reverend John Francis Doerfler
- Bishop of Marquette
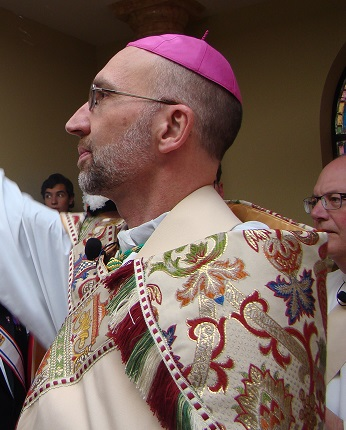
- Doerfler in 2014
- Church: Catholic
- Diocese: Marquette
- Appointed: December 17, 2013
- Installed: February 11, 2014
- Predecessor: Alexander King Sample

Orders
- Ordination: July 13, 1991 by Robert Joseph Banks
- Consecration: February 11, 2014 by Allen Henry Vigneron, David L. Ricken, and Alexander King Sample

Personal details
- Born: November 2, 1964 (age 61) Appleton, Wisconsin
- Denomination: Catholic
- Residence: Marquette, Michigan
- Parents: Henry and Germaine Mancl Doerfler
- Occupation: Catholic Bishop
- Education: College of St. Thomas; Pontifical Gregorian University; The Catholic University of America
- Motto: Evangelii gaudium (Latin for 'The joy of the Gospel')

Styles of John Francis Doerfler
- Reference style: His Excellency; The Most Reverend
- Spoken style: Your Excellency
- Religious style: Bishop

John Francis Doerfler (born November 2, 1964) is an American Catholic prelate who serves as bishop of the Diocese of Marquette in Michigan.

== Biography ==
=== Early life and education ===
Doerfler was born on November 2, 1964, to Henry and Germaine Mancl Doerfler in Appleton, Wisconsin. He attended Appleton West High School and graduated in 1983. He earned a Bachelor of Arts in philosophy and classics from the College of St. Thomas in St. Paul, Minnesota, in 1987.

Doerfler entered the seminary and was sent to the Pontifical Gregorian University in Rome, where he earned a Bachelor of Sacred Theology degree in 1990.

=== Ordination and ministry ===
On July 13, 1991, Doerfler was ordained a priest by Bishop Robert Joseph Banks for the Diocese of Green Bay at Saint Francis Xavier Cathedral in Green Bay.

After his 1991 ordination, the diocese assigned Doerfler as parochial vicar at St. John Nepomucene Parish in Little Chute, Wisconsin, from 1991 to 1995. He went to Washington, D.C. in 1995 to attend the Catholic University of America. He was awarded a Licentiate in Canon Law in 1997. After he returned to Wisconsin, Bishop Robert Joseph Banks appointed him as defender of the bond for the diocesan tribunal and parochial vicar of St. Francis Xavier Cathedral Parish.

Doerfler continued his studies at the Pontifical John Paul II Institute for Studies on Marriage and Family at Catholic University, receiving his Licentiate in Sacred Theology in 1999. Banks named Doerfler as vice chancellor of the diocese in 1998. Bishop David Zubik named Doerfler as chancellor and vicar general in 2005. For the next year, he served as administrator of Saint Francis Xavier Cathedral. Doerfler received a Doctor of Sacred Theology in 2008 from Catholic University.

In 2011, Doerfler said in a legal deposition that he destroyed records relating to possible sexual abuse crimes by diocesan priests. He stated that he destroyed the records in accordance to federal privacy laws and as part of an initiative by Bishop David L. Ricken. Doerfler served as the chaplain to Legatus and as a member of the diocesan college of consultors.

=== Bishop of Marquette ===
On December 17, 2013, Pope Francis appointed Doerfler as the bishop of Marquette. He was consecrated at St. Peter Cathedral in Marquette by Archbishop Allen Henry Vigneron, with Bishop David L. Ricken and Archbishop Alexander King Sample serving as co-consecrators, on February 11, 2014.

In 2012, Doerfler announced that self-declared transgender Catholics or Catholics in same-sex marriages could not receive baptism or communions unless they "repent".

== See also ==
- Catholic Church hierarchy
- Catholic Church in the United States
- Historical list of the Catholic bishops of the United States
- List of Catholic bishops of the United States
- Lists of patriarchs, archbishops, and bishops

== Episcopal succession ==
Catholic Church titles
Preceded by Alexander King Sample	Bishop of Marquette; 2014–present	Incumbent
