= Ignatius Mrak =

Slovenian-born American prelate

His Excellency, The Right Reverend Ignatius Mrak
- Bishop of Sault Sainte Marie and Marquette; Titular Bishop of Antinoë
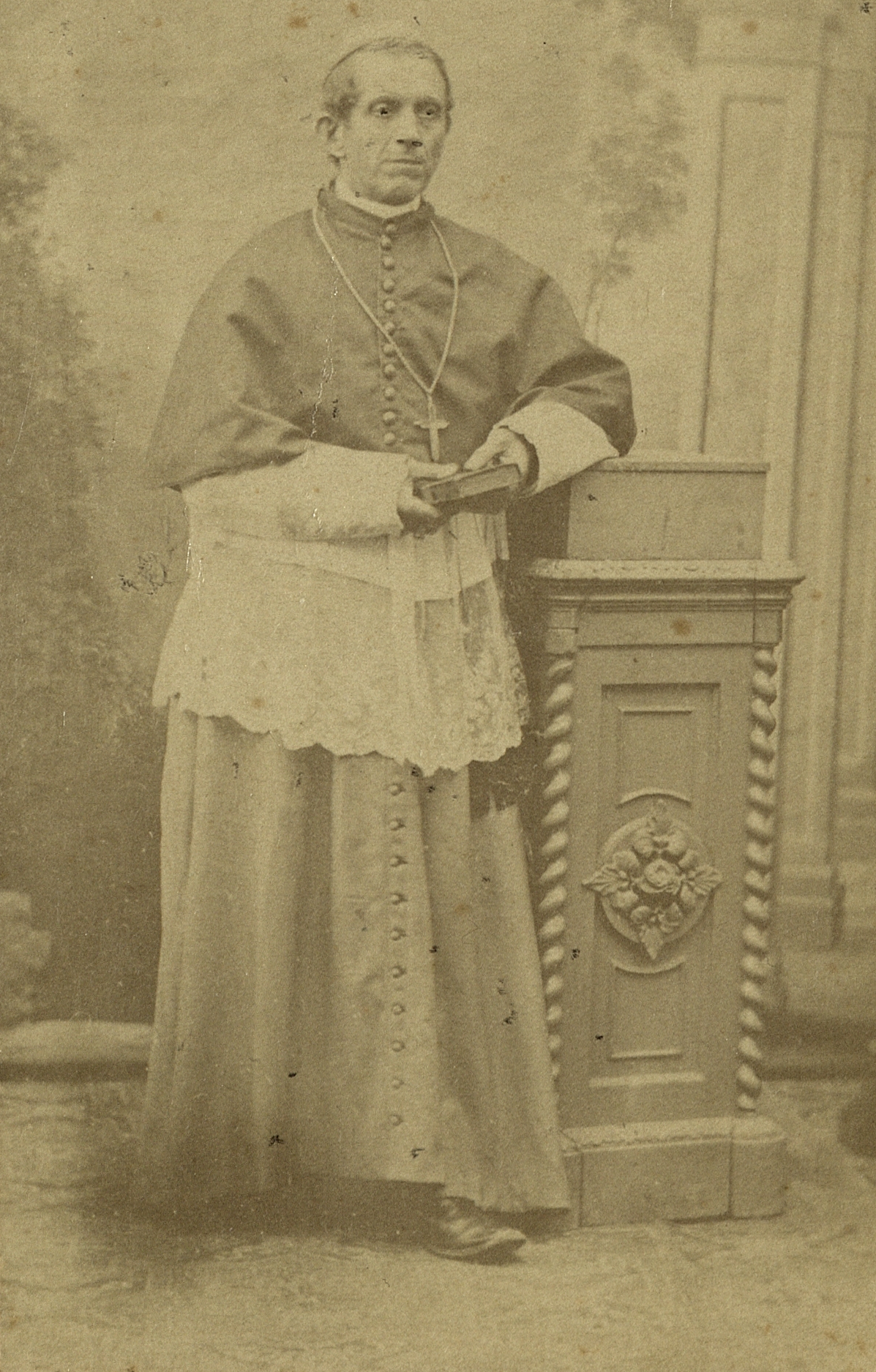
- Church: Catholic Church
- Diocese: Diocese of Sault Sainte Marie and Marquette
- Appointed: September 25, 1868
- Term ended: April 28, 1879
- Predecessor: Frederic Baraga
- Successor: John Vertin

Orders
- Ordination: August 13, 1837 by Anton Aloys Wolf
- Consecration: February 7, 1869 by John Baptist Purcell

Personal details
- Born: Ignatz Mrack; October 16, 1810 Hotovlja, Duchy of Carniola, Austrian Empire
- Died: January 2, 1901 (aged 90) Marquette, Michigan, US
- Motto: Unum est necessarium (There is need of only one thing)

Ignatius Mrak (October 16, 1810 – January 2, 1901) was a Slovenian-born American prelate of the Catholic Church who served as bishop of Sault Saint Marie and Marquette in Michigan from 1869 to 1879.

== Biography ==
=== Early life ===
Ignatius Mrak was born on October 16, 1810, in Hotovlja in the Duchy of Carniola in the Austrian Empire (present-day Slovenia). He was baptized Ignatz Mrack. He was one of six children of Mathias and Maria (née Demscher) Mrak. He received his early education at schools in Poljane and Kranj before attending the Bežigrad Gymnasium, a Jesuit school in Ljubljana. In 1834, he entered the diocesan seminary of Ljubljana, where he completed his theological studies with honors.

=== Priesthood ===
Mrak was ordained a priest for the Diocese of Ljubljana on August 13, 1837, in Ljubljana by Anton Aloys Wolf, its prince-bishop. After passing a rigorous state examination, he was appointed as a tutor in 1838 to the son of Baron Peter Pirquet in Legnago, then also part of the Austrian Empire. He returned to Carniola in 1840 to serve as an assistant pastor at parishes in Poljane and Slavina.

Influenced by the missionary work of his fellow Slovene, Reverend Frederic Baraga, with Native Americans, in the Diocese of Detroit, Mrak requested incardination there. After being accepted, Mrak arrived in Michigan in late 1845. Bishop Peter Lefevere immediately assigned him to assist Reverend Francis Pierz, another Slovene, at the missions in the L'Arbre Croche area of the Upper Peninsula. Mrak quickly learned the Ottawa dialect; One month after arriving in America, Mrak preached an entire sermon in Ottawa.

In 1847, the diocese assigned Mrak his own mission at St. Anthony's in Cross Village, Michigan, while also attending other missions in Michigan:

- St. Francis Xavier's in Readmond
- St. Leopold's on Beaver Island in Lake Michigan
- Immaculate Conception in Peshawbestown

Pope Leo IX in 1853 erected the Vicariate Apostolic of Upper Michigan, taking the Upper Peninsula region from the Diocese of Detroit, and appointed Baraga as its vicar apostolic. Mrak was incardinated into the new vicariate apostolic.

Four years later, in 1857, Leo IX elevated the vicariate to the Diocese of Sault Sainte Marie, with Baraga as its first bishop. He appointed Mrak vicar general of the diocese in 1859. After returning from a European trip to recruit priests for the diocese, Mrak asked the Vatican to reassign him back to Carniola. to return to Slovenia. However, Baraga and Lefevere persuaded him to stay in Michigan.

=== Bishop of Sault Saint Marie and Marquette ===
On September 25, 1868, Mrak was named to succeed the late Bishop Baraga as bishop of Sault Saint Marie and Marquette by Pius IX. However, Mrak was reluctant to accept the position; he refused to respond to the letters announcing his appointment for several months. He finally yielded and received his episcopal consecration on February 7, 1869, from Archbishop John Purcell, with Bishops Lefevere and John Henni serving as co-consecrators, at St. Peter in Chains Cathedral in Cincinnati, Ohio.

Mrak attended the First Vatican Council in Rome (1869–1870), which was announced a few months after his consecration. Over the course of his tenure as bishop, the diocese saw slow development. He increased the number of churches from 21 to 27 and the number of priests from 15 to 20. Two priests he ordained were Reverend John Stariha, a Slovene who would become the first bishop of the Diocese of Lead in South Dakota and Reverend Frederick Eis, a future bishop of Marquette. At the same time, a depression in the Copper Country industry lead to a significant decline in the Catholic population. Two prominent schools, one in Sault Ste. Marie and the other in Hancock, Michigan, closed during his first year as bishop. In 1874 he placed a church in Hancock under interdict after the congregation refused to accept their new pastor.

=== Retirement and legacy ===
After suffering an attack of rheumatism, Mrak submitted his resignation as bishop of Sault Saint Marie and Marquette to the pope. It was accepted on April 28, 1879, by Pope Leo XIII, who gave him the titular see of Antinoë. After his health improved, Mrak served as a pastor at parishes in Negaunee and Menominee, Michigan. He then resumed missionary work, accepting a post in Peshawbestown. Mrak returned to Marquette in 1891 and finished his days as a chaplain at St. Mary's Hospital in that city.

Ignatius Mrak died at St. Mary's Hospital on January 2, 1901, at age 90. He is buried in the crypt of St. Peter's Cathedral.
