= John Vertin =

Slovenian-born American prelate

His Excellency, The Right Reverend John Vertin
- Bishop of Sault Sainte Marie and Marquette
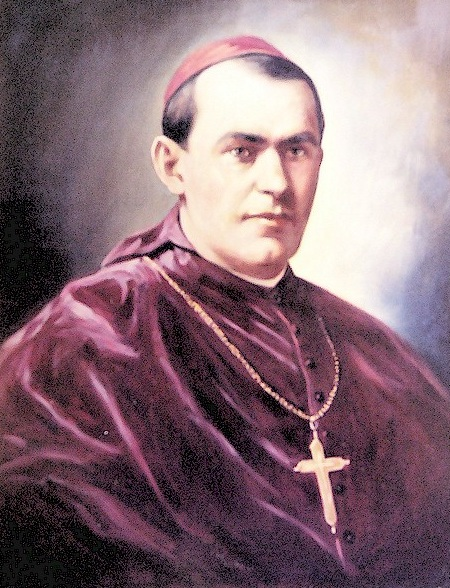
- Church: Catholic Church
- See: Diocese of Sault Sainte Marie and Marquette
- Appointed: May 16, 1879
- Term ended: February 26, 1899 (his death)
- Predecessor: Ignatius Mrak
- Successor: Frederick Eis

Orders
- Ordination: August 31, 1866 by Frederic Baraga
- Consecration: September 14, 1879 by Michael Heiss

Personal details
- Born: Johann Vertin; July 14, 1844 Dobliče, Duchy of Carniola, Austrian Empire
- Died: February 26, 1899 (aged 54) Marquette, Michigan, US
- Education: Saint Francis de Sales Seminary
- Motto: Unum est necessarium (There is need of only one thing)

John Vertin (July 17, 1844 – February 26, 1899) was a Slovenian-born American prelate of the Roman Catholic Church. He served as the third bishop of the Diocese of Sault Sainte Marie and Marquette in Michigan from 1879 until his death in 1899.

== Life ==
=== Early life ===
John Vertin (sometimes spelled Wertin) was born on July 17, 1844, in Dobliče in the Duchy of Carniola in the Austrian Empire (present-day Črnomelj, Slovenia) and baptized Johann Vertin. He was the second of four children of Joseph and Mary (née Deržaj) Vertin. Vertin received his early education at the gymnasium in Novo Mesto in Lower Carniola.

Joseph Vertin was a merchant who came to the United States in 1852 . He settled in Michigan and opened general stores in Hancock and Calumet (now known as Vertin Gallery). Joseph Vertin returned to Carniola in 1857.At age 18, John Vertin arrived in New York City with his family in July 1863 and then departed for Michigan. Deciding to become a priest, Vertin entered Saint Francis de Sales Seminary in St. Francis, Wisconsin, in 1864 to study for the priesthood.

=== Priesthood ===
Vertin was ordained a priest in Marquette, Michigan, for the Diocese of Sault Sainte Marie and Marquette on August 31, 1866, by Bishop Frederic Baraga. It was the first ordination performed in Marquette.

After his ordination, the diocese assigned Vertin as pastor of Saint Ignatius Loyola Parish in Houghton, Michigan, where he served until 1871. He was then transferred to Saint Paul's Parish in Negaunee, Michigan, remaining there for eight years. Both were difficult assignments, with congregations who spoke many different languages. Saint Paul's was also was burdened with significant debt.

=== Bishop of Sault Sainte Marie and Marquette ===
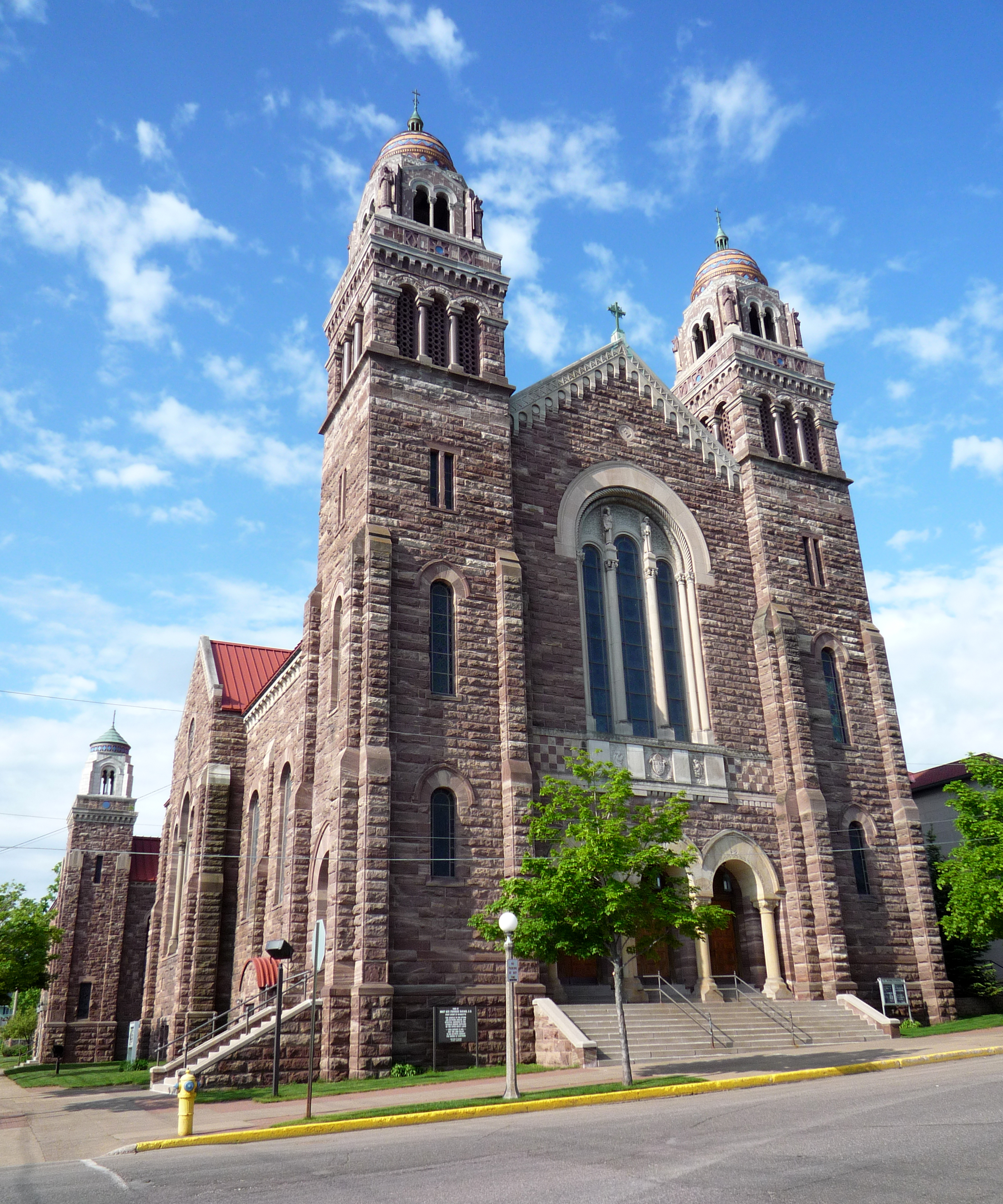
The current St. Peter's Cathedral, Marquette, Michigan (2009)

On May 16, 1879, Vertin was appointed the third bishop of Sault Sainte Marie and Marquette by Pope Leo XIII. He succeeded Bishop Ignatius Mrak and was the third Slovenian bishop of the diocese. He received his episcopal consecration on September 14, 1879, from Bishop Michael Heiss, with Bishops Caspar Borgess and John Spalding serving as co-consecrators, at Saint Paul's Church in Negaunee.At age 34, Vertin became the youngest Catholic bishop in the country.

Just under a month after his consecration, the original St. Peter Cathedral in Marquette was destroyed by fire. This was allegedly an act of arson by some angry parishioners over the removal of the cathedral's pastor, Reverend John Kenny. Vertin rebuilt the cathedral, laying the cornerstone in June 1881. He consecrated the new and consecrating the St. Peter's Cathedral in July 1890. The main altar was a gift from Vertin's father and a side altar was donated by Vertin's brother-in-law.

From October to November 1884, Vertin attended the third Plenary Council of Baltimore, a meeting of bishops of the United States in Baltimore, Maryland. He sat on the council's committee for Christian doctrine and brought Reverend Francis Weninger with him as his theologian. In 1889, Vertin convoked a conference with the diocese's priests, which created an fund for sick priests and required all Catholic children to attend Catholic school. Over the course of his 20 years as bishop, Vertin oversaw an increase in the diocese's Catholic population from 20,000 to 60,000, the number of churches from 27 to 56, and the number of priests from 20 to 62.

=== Death and legacy ===
John Vertin died in Marquette on February 26, 1899, at age 54. He was buried in the crypt of St. Peter Cathedral.
