= Francis Joseph Magner =

American Catholic bishop (1887–1947)

His Excellency, The Most Reverend Francis Joseph Magner
- Bishop of Marquette
- Church: Roman Catholic Church
- See: Diocese of Marquette
- In office: February 24, 1941 to June 13, 1947
- Predecessor: Joseph C. Plagens
- Successor: Thomas Lawrence Noa

Orders
- Ordination: May 17, 1913 by James Edward Quigley
- Consecration: February 24, 1941 by Samuel Stritch

Personal details
- Born: March 18, 1887 Wilmington, Illinois, US
- Died: June 13, 1947 (aged 60) Marquette, Michigan, US
- Education: St. Mary's College; University of Propaganda; Apollinarus University
- Motto: In te Domine speravi (In your Lord, I have trusted)

Francis Joseph Magner (March 18, 1887 – June 13, 1947) was an American prelate of the Roman Catholic Church. He served as bishop of the Diocese of Marquette in Michigan from 1941 to 1947.

== Biography ==
=== Early life ===
Francis Magner was born on March 18, 1887, in Wilmington, Illinois, to James and Margaret (née Follen) Magner. He was the third of eight children; one sister, Elizabeth Magner, joined the Sisters of Mercy and one brother, James Magner, also became a priest. James Magner the elder worked as a farmer and merchant, also serving as a city commissioner and alderman.

After graduating from St. Ignatius College in Chicago, Illinois, Francis Magner attended St. Mary's College in St. Marys, Kansas. He continued his studies in Rome, residing at the Pontifical North American College. Magner earned a Doctor of Philosophy degree from the University of Propaganda in 1909, and a Bachelor of Canon Law degree from Apollinarus University in 1911.

=== Priesthood ===
While in Rome, Magner was ordained to the priesthood by Archbishop James Edward Quigley for the Archdiocese of Chicago on May 17, 1913. After his ordination, Magner held the following parish assignments in Illinois:

- Curate at St. Mary Nativity in Joliet
- Curate at St. Pius V in Chicago
- Curate at St. Mel in Chicago
- Curate at St. Francis Xavier in Wilmette
- Pastor of St. James in Highwood (1924 to 1927)
- Pastor of St. Mary in Evanston (1927 to 1941)

Magner was named a monsignor by the Vatican in 1939.

=== Bishop of Marquette ===
On December 21, 1940, Magner was appointed the seventh bishop of Marquette by Pope Pius XII. He received his episcopal consecration on February 24, 1941, from Archbishop Samuel Stritch, with Bishops Eugene J. McGuinness and William O'Brien serving as co-consecrators, at Holy Name Cathedral in Chicago. His installation took place at St. Peter Cathedral in Marquette on March 20, 1941.

During his six-year tenure, Magner provided attention to the mission parishes of the diocese, established the diocesan newspaper, promoted U.S. Laymen's Retreat Association, and created seven catechetical schools.

=== Death and legacy ===
Francis Magner died on June 13, 1947, after a long illness in Marquette, at age 60. He is buried in the crypt of St. Peter Cathedral.
