= Joseph C. Plagens =

Polish-born prelate (1880–1943)

His Excellency, The Most Reverend Joseph Casimir Plagens
- Bishop of Grand Rapids
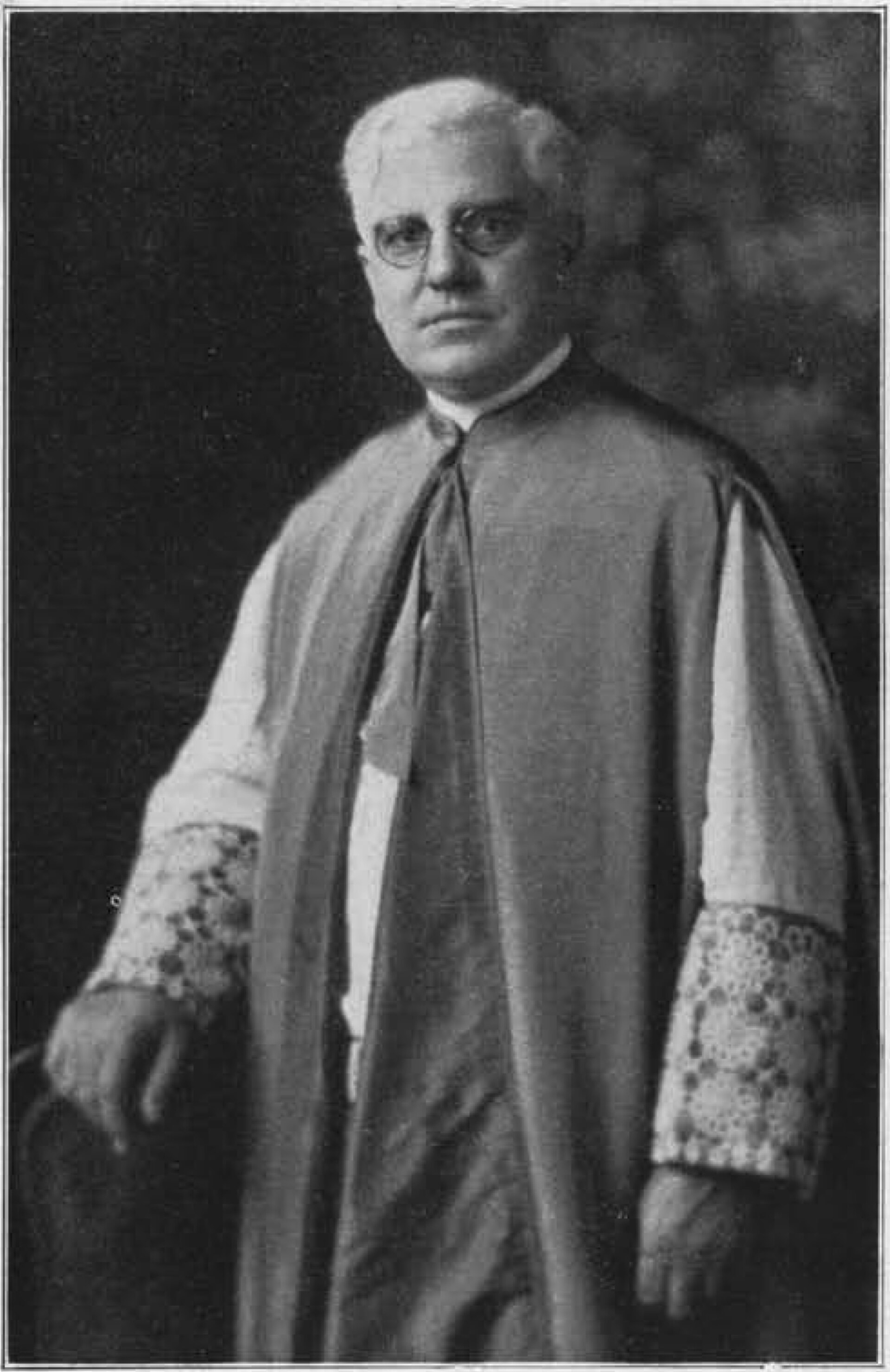
- Plagens, circa 1927
- Church: Roman Catholic Church
- See: Diocese of Grand Rapids
- In office: February 18, 1941; March 31, 1943
- Predecessor: Joseph G. Pinten
- Successor: Francis J. Haas
- Previous posts: Auxiliary Bishop of Detroit (1924 to 1935); Bishop of Sault Sainte Marie-Marquette (1935 to 1937); Bishop of Marquette (1937 to 1941)

Orders
- Ordination: July 4, 1903 by John Samuel Foley
- Consecration: September 30, 1924 by Michael Gallagher

Personal details
- Born: January 29, 1880 Czeszewo, Wągrowiec County, German Empire (now Poland)
- Died: March 31, 1943 (aged 63) Grand Rapids, Michigan, US
- Education: University of Detroit; St. Mary's Seminary
- Motto: Servus tuus ego sum (I am your servant)

Joseph Casimir Plagens (January 29, 1880 – March 31, 1943) was a Polish-born prelate of the Roman Catholic Church. He served as bishop of the Diocese of Grand Rapids in Michigan from 1941 to 1943.

Plagens previously served as bishop of the Diocese of Marquette in Michigan from 1937 to 1941, as bishop of the Diocese of Sault Sainte Marie-Marquette from 1935 to 1937 and as an auxiliary bishop of the Archdiocese of Detroit in Michigan from 1924 to 1935.

== Biography ==
=== Early life ===
Joseph Plagens was born on January 29, 1880, in Czeszewo, near Poznań in the German Empire (present day Poland) to Andrew and Constance (née Grygier) Plagens. When he was age four, his family immigrated to the United States, settling in Michigan. Plagens earned a Master of Arts degree from the University of Detroit in 1899, and a Bachelor of Sacred Theology degree from St. Mary's Seminary in Baltimore, Maryland, in 1903.

=== Priesthood ===
Plagens was ordained to the priesthood for the Archdiocese of Detroit by Bishop John Foley on July 4, 1903. After his ordination, Plagens filled the following pastoral assignments in parishes in Michigan:

- Assistant pastor at Sweetest Heart of Mary in Detroit (1903 to 1906)
- Pastor of St. Michael's in Port Austin (1906 to 1911)
- Pastor of St. Florian's in Hamtramck (1911 to 1919)
- Pastor of Sweetest Heart of Mary in Detroit (1919 to 1935)

The Vatican raised Plagens to the rank of domestic prelate in June 1923, allowing him the title of monsignor.

=== Auxiliary Bishop of Detroit ===
On May 22, 1924, Pope Pius XI appointed Plagens as an auxiliary bishop of Detroit and as titular bishop of Rhodiopolis. He received his episcopal consecration at Saints Peter and Paul Church in Detroit on September 30, 1924, from Bishop Michael Gallagher, with Bishops Paul Rhode and Edward Hoban serving as co-consecrators. As auxiliary bishop, he remained pastor of Sweetest Heart of Mary Parish. Plagens was eventually named as vicar general for the archdiocese.

=== Bishop of Sault Sainte Marie-Marquette ===
Pius XI named Plagens as the sixth bishop of Sault Sainte Marie-Marquette on November 16, 1935.

=== Bishop of Marquette ===
On January 4, 1937, Pius XI suppressed the Diocese of Sault Sainte Marie-Marquette and erected in its place the Diocese of Marquette. In 1938, a transfer of a priest broke into violence. Plagens had ordered the transfer of Reverend Simon Borkowski, pastor of St. Barbara's Parish in Vulcan, Michigan, to a seminary in Wisconsin. However, Borkowski had refused to go, instead remaining inside his church with 20 supporters picketing outside. One day, a group of sixty men arrived at St. Barbara's, pushed past the picketers, and brought Borkowski out of the building. The newly appointed pastor, Reverend Erasmus Dooley, was allowed to enter. However, a group of 100 Borkowski supporters soon arrived and a full-scale brawl erupted. In the end, Dooley left the church and Borkowski re-entered it.

=== Bishop of Grand Rapids ===
Pope Pius XII named Plagens as bishop of Grand Rapids on December 16, 1940. He was installed on February 18, 1941. Joseph Plagens died at St. Mary's Hospital in Grand Rapids, Michigan, on March 31, 1943, at age 63 of coronary thrombosis. He was originally buried at Mount Calvary Cemetery in Grand Rapids, but was later removed to Resurrection Cemetery in Wyoming, Michigan.

Catholic Church titles
Preceded by Paul Joseph Nussbaum	Bishop of Sault Sainte Marie-Marquette; 1935–1940	Succeeded by Francis Joseph Magner
Preceded by Joseph G. Pinten	Bishop of Grand Rapids; 1940–1943	Succeeded by Francis J. Haas
