= Thomas Lawrence Noa =

American catholic bishop

His Excellency, The Most Reverend Thomas Lawrence Noa
- Bishop of Marquette; Titular Bishop of Talaptula
- Church: Roman Catholic Church
- See: Diocese of Marquette
- Predecessor: Francis Joseph Magner
- Successor: Charles Salatka
- Other posts: Coadjutor Bishop of Sioux City; March 19, 1946 to August 25, 1947

Orders
- Ordination: December 23, 1916 by Basilio Pompili
- Consecration: March 19, 1946 by Edward Mooney

Personal details
- Born: December 18, 1892 Iron Mountain, Michigan, US
- Died: March 13, 1977 (aged 84) Marquette, Michigan, US
- Motto: Dominus et Deus meus (My Lord and my God)

Thomas Lawrence Noa (December 18, 1892 – March 13, 1977) was an American prelate of the Roman Catholic Church. He served as bishop of the Diocese of Marquette in Michigan from 1947 to 1968. He previously served as coadjutor bishop of the Diocese of Sioux Falls in Iowa from 1946 to 1947.

== Biography ==
=== Early life ===
One of nine children, Thomas Noa was born on December 18, 1892, in Iron Mountain, Michigan, to John and Magdalene (née Walczak) Noa. He attended St. Francis Seminary in Milwaukee, Wisconsin, from 1907 to 1911. Noa then entered the College of the Propaganda in Rome, where he earned a Doctor of Sacred Theology degree in 1917.

=== Priesthood ===
Noa was ordained to the priesthood in Rome by Cardinal Basilio Pompili on December 23, 1916. Following his return to Michigan in 1917, he was appointed to the faculty of St. Joseph Seminary in Grand Rapids, Michigan, as a professor. Noa was named rector of St. Joseph in 1927. He was named a domestic prelate by Pope Pius XI in 1935.

=== Coadjutor Bishop of Sioux City ===
On February 22, 1946, Noa was appointed as coadjutor bishop of Sioux City in Iowa and titular bishop of Salona by Pope Pius XII. He received his episcopal consecration at the Cathedral of Saint Andrew in Grand Rapids on March 19, 1946, from Cardinal Edward Mooney, with Bishops Charles Daniel White and Joseph H. Albers serving as co-consecrators.

=== Bishop of Marquette ===
Before Noa could succeed as bishop of Sioux City, Pius XII appointed him as the eighth bishop of Marquette on August 25, 1947. He was installed on September 24, 1947, in Marquette, Michigan. Noa in 1952 opened the cause, or initiative, for the canonization of the former bishop of Marquette, Frederic Baraga. In 1958, Noa issued a directive that Catholics in his diocese should not attend meetings of Moral Re-armament, an international spiritual association, citing its dangers to Catholic faith. Noa attended all four sessions of the Second Vatican Council in Rome between 1962 and 1965.

=== Retirement and legacy ===
On January 5, 1968, Pope Paul VI accepted Noa's resignation as bishop of Marquette and appointed him as titular bishop of Talaptula. Noa resigned his titular see on December 31, 1970. Thomas Noa died in Marquette on March 13, 1977, age 84. The Bishop Noa Home, a residence for seniors in Escanaba, Michigan, is named after him.

== External links and additional sources ==
- Cheney, David M. "Salona (Titular See)". Catholic-Hierarchy.org. (for Chronology of Bishops) ^{[self-published]}
- Chow, Gabriel. "Titular Episcopal See of Salona (Italy)". GCatholic.org. (for Chronology of Bishops) ^{[self-published]}

Catholic Church titles
Preceded by Francis Joseph Magner	Bishop of Marquette; 1947–1968	Succeeded by Charles Salatka
