= Anton Aloys Wolf =

Slovenian Prince-Bishop of Laibach (Ljubljana)

The Right Reverend Anton Aloys Wolf
- Roman Catholic Archdiocese of Ljubljana
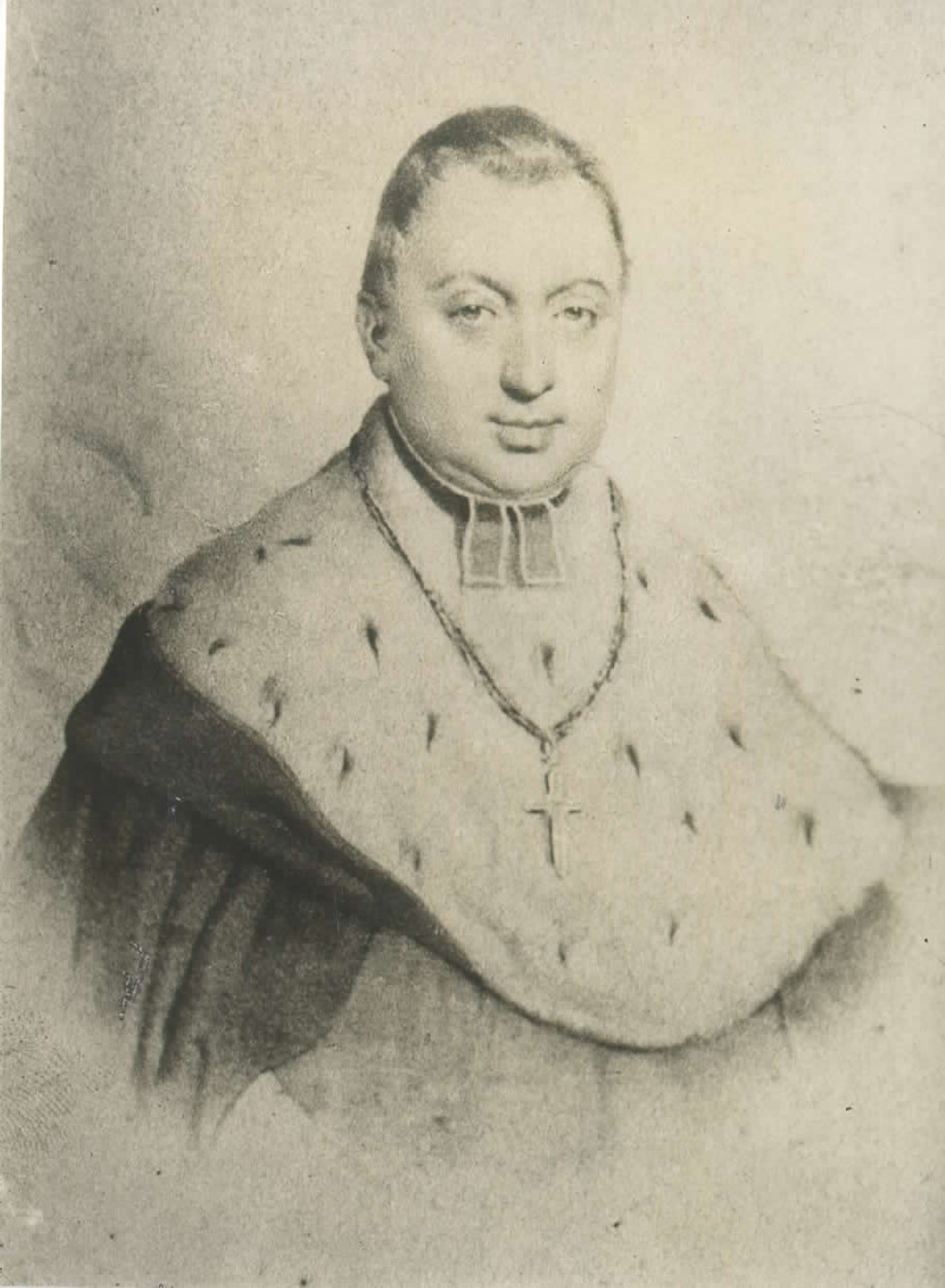
- Church: Latin Church
- Installed: July 12, 1824
- Term ended: February 7, 1859
- Predecessor: Bishop Augustin Johann Josef Gruber
- Successor: Jernej Vidmar

Orders
- Ordination: 1804 (deacon)
- Consecration: 1824

Personal details
- Born: Antonius Aloisius Wolf; June 14, 1782 Idrija, Slovenia
- Died: February 7, 1859 (aged 76)

Anton Aloys Wolf (June 14, 1782 – February 7, 1859) was a Prince-Bishop of Laibach (Ljubljana) during the 19th century.

== Biography ==
Wolf was born in Idrija and baptized Antonius Aloisius. After studying theology in Ljubljana, Anton Wolf became a deacon on September 2, 1804. On December 15, 1804, he was ordained as a priest. In 1807, he became the chancellor of the diocese, and in 1814, the canon of St. Nicholas's Cathedral. On February 27, 1824, the Austrian authorities chose Anton Wolf to head the Ljubljana diocese. On July 12, 1824, Pope Leo XII approved Wolf's appointment, and he was installed as bishop on October 2, 1824. During his term as bishop, Wolf reorganized the Ljubljana diocese. He initiated and financed the publication of a new translation of the Bible in Slovene (1863), a German–Slovene dictionary (1860), and a Slovene–German dictionary. Wolf died on February 7, 1859, in Ljubljana.

== Legacy ==
A street in Ljubljana is named after Anton Wolf.
