= Mark Francis Schmitt =

His Excellency, The Most Reverend Mark Francis Schmitt
- Bishop of Marquette; Titular Bishop of Ceanannus Mór
- See: Diocese of Marquette
- Predecessor: Charles Salatka
- Successor: James Henry Garland
- Previous post: Auxiliary Bishop of Grand Rapids (1970 to 1978)

Orders
- Ordination: May 22, 1948 by Stanislaus Vincent Bona
- Consecration: June 24, 1970 by Aloysius John Wycislo

Personal details
- Born: February 14, 1923 Algoma, Wisconsin, US
- Died: December 14, 2011 (aged 88) De Pere, Wisconsin, US
- Education: College of Saint Benedict and Saint John's University
- Motto: Serve in peace and charity

Mark Francis Schmitt (February 14, 1923 – December 14, 2011) was an American prelate of the Roman Catholic Church. He served as the tenth bishop of the Diocese of Marquette in Michigan from 1978 to 1992. Schmitt previously served as auxiliary bishop of the Diocese of Green Bay in Wisconsin from 1970 to 1978.

== Biography ==
=== Early life ===
Mark Schmitt was born in Algoma, Wisconsin, on February 14, 1923. After attending St. Mary School in Algoma, Schmitt entered the Salvatorian Minor Seminary in St. Nazianz, Wisconsin. He later attended St. John's Seminary and University in Collegeville, Minnesota.

=== Priesthood ===
Schmitt was ordained by Bishop Stanislaus Vincent Bona to the priesthood at Saint Francis Xavier Cathedral in Green Bay, Wisconsin, on May 22, 1948, for the Diocese of Green Bay. After his ordination, Schmitt served as associate pastor at St. Rose Parish in Clintonville, Wisconsin. Schmitt in 1954 was appointed director of the Manitowoc Apostolate, the diocese branch of Catholic Charities. He also served as director of the diocesan hospitals. In 1960, Schmitt was appointed pastor of Ss. Peter and Paul Parish of Weyauwega, Wisconsin and St. Bernard Parish in Green Bay, Wisconsin.

=== Auxiliary Bishop of Green Bay ===
On April 30, 1970, Pope Paul VI appointed Schmitt as titular bishop of Ceanannus Mór and auxiliary bishop of the Diocese of Green Bay; he was consecrated at the Brown County Veterans Memorial Arena in Ashwaubenon, Wisconsin, by Bishop Aloysius John Wycislo on June 24, 1970.

=== Bishop of Marquette ===
On March 21, 1978, Paul VI appointed Schmitt as bishop of Marquette. He was installed on May 8, 1978. As bishop, Schmitt founded the Lay Ministries Leadership School to prepare lay parishioners for leadership roles in parishes. He also create bachelor's and master's degree programs in pastoral studies.

On October 6, 1992, Pope John Paul II accepted Schmitt's resignation as bishop of Marquette. Mark Schmitt died on December 14, 2011, at a hospice in De Pere, Wisconsin.

== Notes ==
Catholic Church titles
Preceded by Charles Salatka	Bishop of Marquette; 1978–1992	Succeeded by James Henry Garland
Preceded by –	Auxiliary Bishop of Green Bay; 1970–1978	Succeeded by –
