= Czeszewo, Wągrowiec County =

Czeszewo
- Village
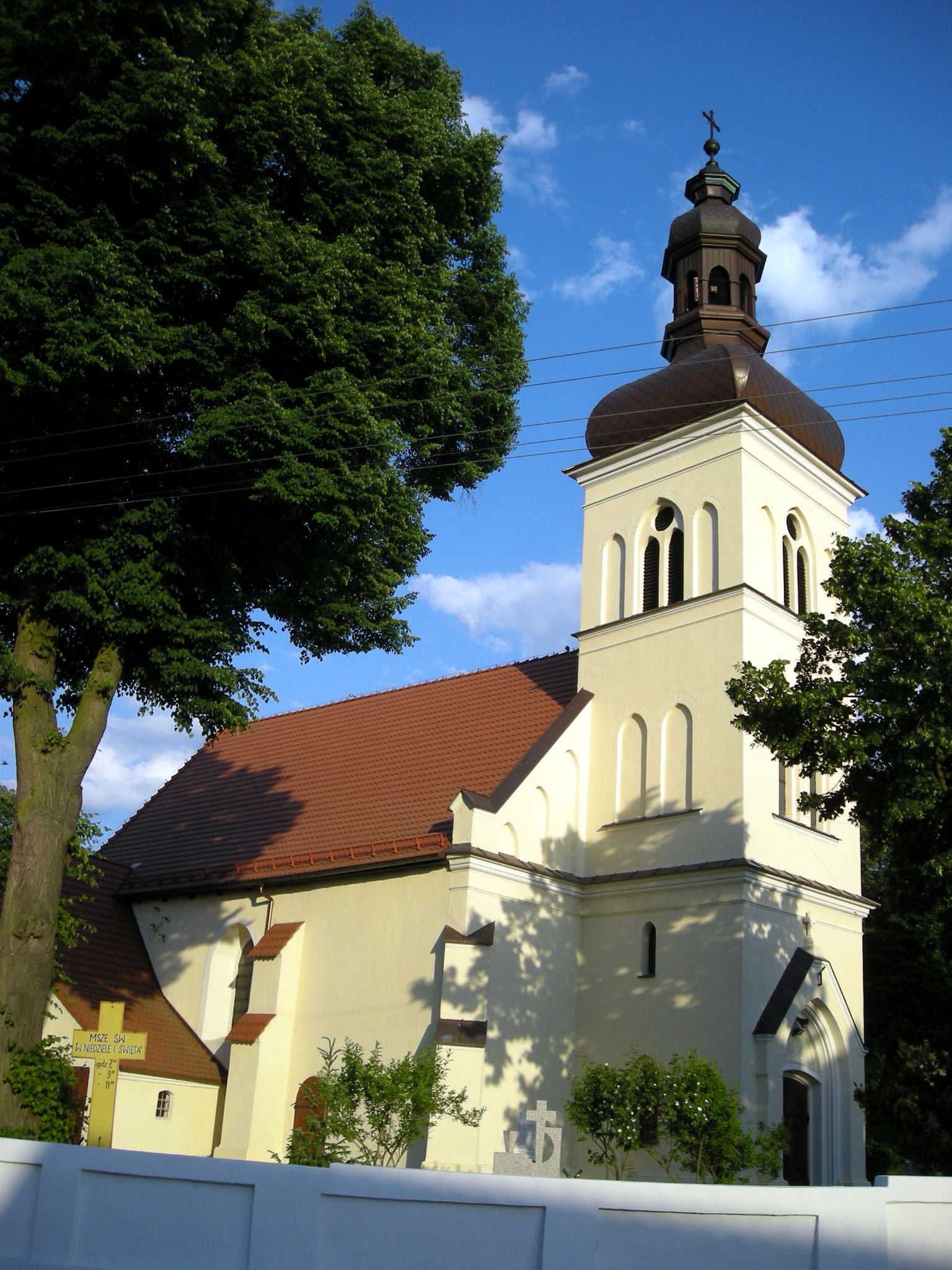
- Saint Andrew church

- Location within Poland
- Coordinates: 52°55′N 17°23′E
- Country: Poland
- Voivodeship: Greater Poland
- County: Wągrowiec
- Gmina: Gołańcz

Czeszewo [t͡ʂɛˈʂɛvɔ] is a village in the administrative district of Gmina Gołańcz, within Wągrowiec County, Greater Poland Voivodeship, in west-central Poland.
