= Frederic Baraga =

Catholic missionary and bishop (1797–1868)

Venerable Frederic Baraga
- Bishop of Sault Sainte Marie and Marquette
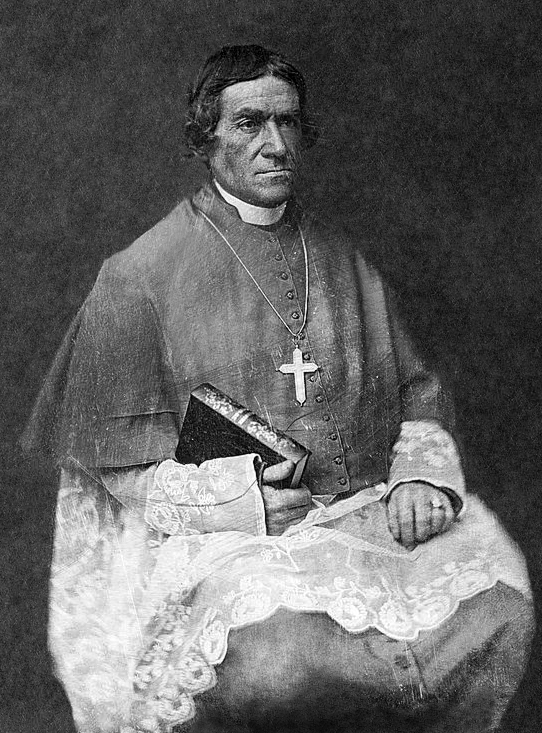
- Bishop Baraga holding his Dictionary of the Otchipwe Language (between 1853 and 1860)
- Province: Detroit
- See: Sault Sainte Marie and Marquette
- Appointed: October 23, 1865
- Term ended: January 19, 1868
- Successor: Ignatius Mrak
- Previous posts: Vicar Apostolic of Upper Michigan (1853-1857); Titular Bishop of Amyzon (1853-1857); Bishop of Sault Saint Marie (1857 to 1865)

Orders
- Ordination: September 21, 1823 by Augustin Johann Joseph Gruber
- Consecration: November 1, 1853 by John Baptist Purcell

Personal details
- Born: Irenaeus Fridericus Paraga; June 29, 1797 Mala Vas, Duchy of Carniola, Austrian Empire, (today Slovenia)
- Died: January 19, 1868 (aged 70) Marquette, Michigan, US
- Buried: St. Peter Cathedral, Marquette
- Denomination: Roman Catholic
- Education: University of Vienna
- Motto: Unum est necessarium (There is need of only one thing)

Styles of Irenaeus Frederic Baraga
- Reference style: His Excellency; The Most Reverend
- Spoken style: Your Excellency
- Religious style: Bishop
- Posthumous style: Venerable

Irenaeus Frederic Baraga (June 29, 1797 – January 19, 1868; Slovene: Irenej Friderik Baraga) was a Slovenian Catholic missionary to the United States, grammarian and author of Christian poetry and hymns in Native American languages. He served as the first bishop of Sault Sainte Marie and Marquette in Michigan from 1865 to 1868. He previously served as bishop of Sault Sainte Marie from 1857 to 1865 and as vicar apostolic of Upper Michigan from 1853 to 1857.

Baraga's letters about his missionary work were published widely in Europe, inspiring the priests John Neumann and Francis Xavier Pierz to emigrate to the United States. In 2012, Pope Benedict XVI declared Baraga as venerable.

== Early life ==
Frederic Baraga was born on June 29, 1797, in the manor house at Mala Vas (German: Kleindorf) near the village of Dobrnič in Lower Carniola, a province of the Duchy of Carniola in the Austrian Empire. Today it is part of the Municipality of Trebnje in Slovenia. He was baptized Irenaeus Fridericus Paraga at Saint George's Church in Dobrnič, but never used the name "Irenaeus".

Frederic was the fourth of five children born to Janez Baraga and Marija Katarina Jožefa née Jenčič. His sister Antonija Höffern became the first Slovenian woman to immigrate to the United States. Upon her father's death, Baraga's mother inherited an estate at Mala Vas and substantial fortune. She died in 1808, and her husband in 1812. Frederic spent his childhood in the house of Jurij Dolinar, a lay professor at the diocesan seminary at Ljubljana.

Between 1809 and 1815, during the Napoleonic Wars in Europe, France controlled Carniola. As a result, Baraga became fluent in French, Slovenian and German at an early age. In addition, he learned Latin and Greek, both required subjects in the local schools. By age 16, Baraga was multilingual.

Baraga attended law school at the University of Vienna in Austria, graduating in 1821. Influenced by Reverend Clement Mary Hofbauer, a co-founder of the Redemptorist Order, Baraga decided to become a priest. He then entered the seminary in Ljubljana.

== Priesthood ==
Baraga was ordained a priest for the Archdiocese of Ljubljana at age 26 on September 21, 1823, in St. Nicholas Cathedral in Ljubljana by Bishop Augustin Johann Joseph Gruber. After his ordination, the archdiocese assigned Baraga as an assistant pastor at St. Martin's Parish near Kranj and later at a parish in Metlika in lower Carniola. Baraga was a staunch opponent of Jansenism. During this time, he wrote a spiritual book in Slovene entitled Dušna Paša (Spiritual Sustenance).

In 1830, Bishop Edward Fenwick of from the Diocese of Cincinnati in Ohio recruited Baraga to come to the United States. He left Carniola on October 29, 1830, and docked in New York City on December 31. He arrived in Cincinnati, Ohio, on January 18, 1831. After his arrival, Fenwick assigned Baraga to minister to German immigrants in the Cincinnati area. At the same time, Baraga studied the Ottawa language, a branch of the Algonquian languages. In May 1831, Fenwick sent Baraga to minister to members of the Ottawa Nation at the Catholic mission at L'Arbre Croche (present-day Cross Village, Michigan). Baraga spent his time at L'Arbre Croche mastering their language.

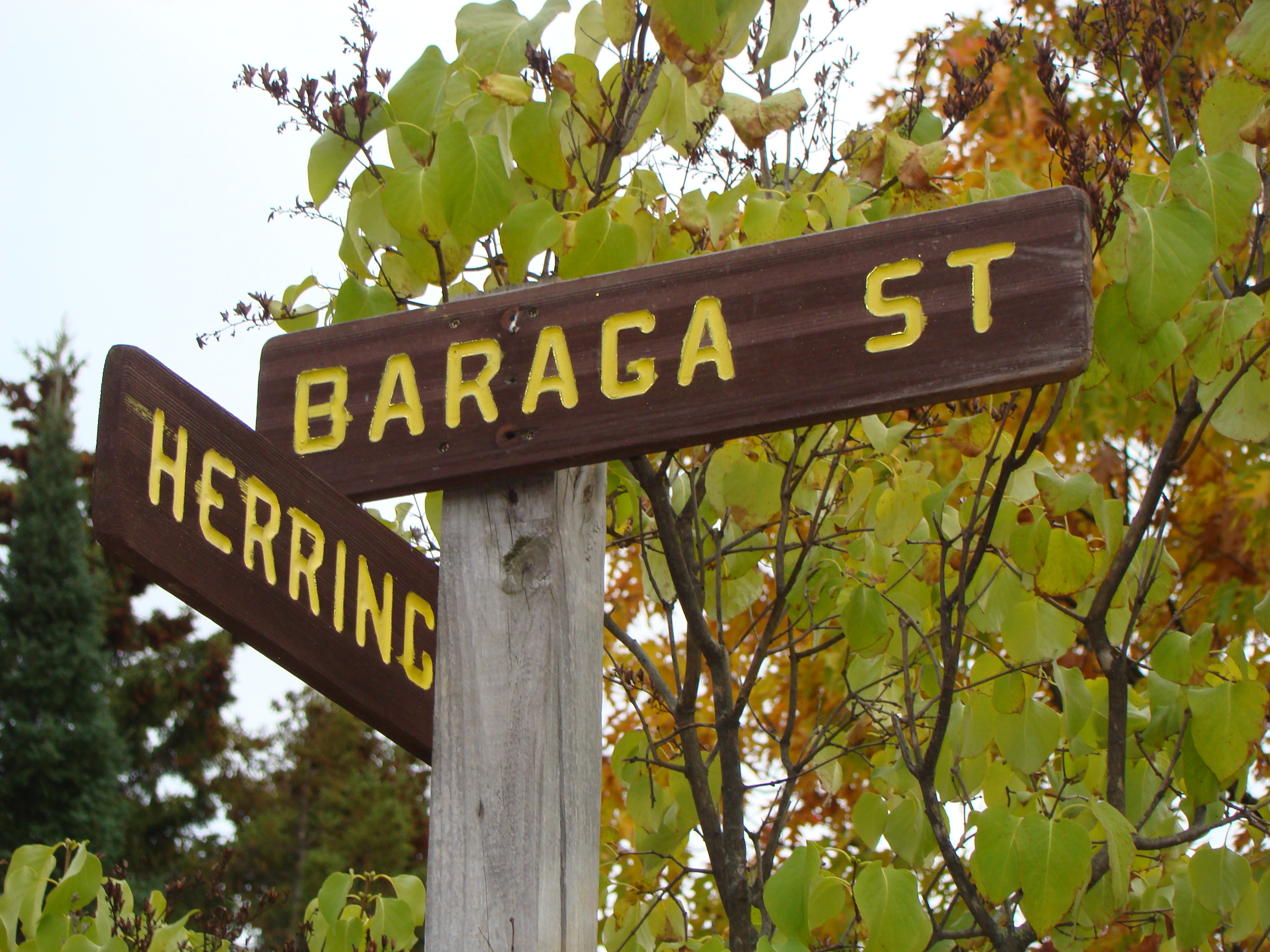
Baraga Street on Madeline Island in Lake Superior (2012)

In 1837, Baraga published Otawa Anamie-Misinaigan, the first book written in the Ottawa language, which included a Catholic catechism and prayer book. After a brief stay at a mission in present-day Grand Rapids, Michigan, in 1835, Baraga moved north to minister to the Ojibway (Chippewa) Nation at La Pointe, Wisconsin. This was a former Jesuit mission on Lake Superior. He was joined at La Pointe by his sister Antonija.

In 1843, Baraga founded a mission at L'Anse, Michigan. During this time, he earned the nickname "the Snowshoe Priest" because he would travel hundreds of miles each year on snowshoes during the harsh winters. He worked to protect the Ojibway from being forced from their lands and published a dictionary and grammar of the Ojibway language.

With the collaboration of many native speakers, Baraga also composed around 100 Catholic hymns in the Ojibwe language. These hymns were published in a hymnal that was used by Catholic Ojibway in Canada and the United States long after Baraga's death. Through the texts Baraga published in his missionary years, the Slovenes learned about many aspects of Native American culture and the United States.

== Vicar Apostolic of Upper Michigan ==
Baraga was appointed by Pope Pius IX as titular bishop of Amyzon and vicar apostolic of Upper Michigan on July 28, 1853. He was consecrated as a bishop on November 1, 1853, in Cincinnati at Saint Peter in Chains Cathedral by Archbishop John Purcell.

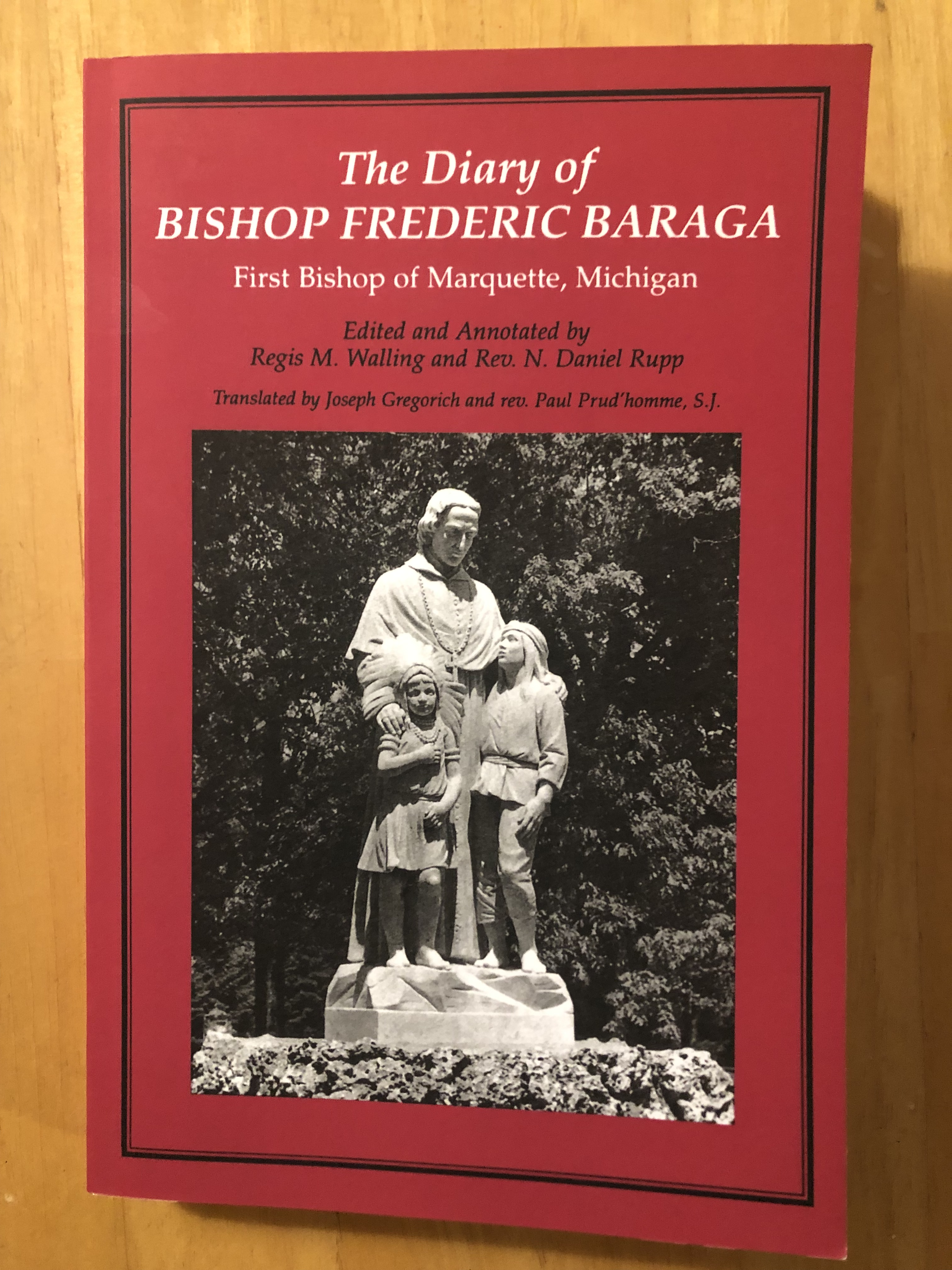
Bishop Baraga's diary (2024)

On June 27, 1852, he began to keep a diary, written in several languages (primarily German, but with English, French, Slovene, Chippewa, Latin, and Italian interspersed), preserving accounts of his missionary travels and his relationship with his sister Amalia.

== Bishop of Sault Saint Marie ==
On January 9, 1857, Pius IX converted the Vicariate Apostolic of Upper Michigan into the Diocese of Sault Saint Marie, with Baraga as its bishop. During this time, the area experienced a population explosion, as European immigrants were attracted to work in the copper and iron mines developed near Houghton, Ontonagon, and Marquette. This presented a challenge because he had few priests and attended to immigrant miners and the Native Americans. Increased development and population encouraged the improvement of transportation on Lake Superior.

The only way to travel in winter was on snowshoes, which Baraga continued to do into his sixties. He was particularly challenged by the vast diversity of peoples in the region, including the native inhabitants, French-Canadian settlers, and the new German and Irish immigrant miners. Difficulties in recruiting staff arose because of many languages; while Baraga spoke eight languages fluently, he had trouble recruiting priests who could do the same.

Baraga traveled twice to Europe to raise money for his diocese, once in 1836 and again in 1854. He was presented a jeweled cross and episcopal ring by the Emperor Franz Joseph I of Austria. Baraga later sold these gifts to raise funds for his missions.

Baraga wrote numerous letters to the Society for the Propagation of the Faith in Rome, describing his missionary activities. The Society published them widely as examples of its missions in North America. These letters inspired the priests John Neumann and Francis Xavier Pierz to come to the United States to work. In time, Baraga became renowned throughout Europe for his work. In his last ten years, his health gradually declined; he became intermittently deaf and suffered a series of strokes.

== Bishop of Sault Sainte Marie and Marquette ==
Recognizing the growth of Marquette, Pius IX on October 23, 1865, replaced the Diocese of Sault Sainte Marie with the Diocese of Sault Sainte Marie and Marquette. In 1866, Baraga made Marquette his permanent residence. In 1865, Baraga wrote to Pius IX in support of the canonization of his former confessor, Clement Hofbauer.

Baraga died on January 19, 1868, in Marquette. He is buried in a chapel constructed for him at Saint Peter Cathedral; he formerly reposed with other bishops of Marquette in the cathedral crypt.

== Selected works ==
- Frederic Baraga's Short History of the North American Indians, edited by Graham MacDonald (Calgary: UCalgary Press, 2004). "Originally published in 1837 in Europe in German, French, and Slovenian editions, and appearing here in English for the first time, Frederic Baraga's Short History of the North American Indians is the personal, first-hand account of a Catholic missionary to the Great Lakes area of North America." – Jacket
- Chippewa Indians, as recorded by Rev. Frederick Baraga in 1847 (New York: Studia Slovenica, League of Slovenian Americans, 1976)
- A Dictionary of Otchipwe Language Explained in English (1853); revised by other in 1878; republished as A Dictionary of the Ojibway Language with a foreword by John D. Nichols (Minneapolis: Minnesota Historical Society, 1992)
- Dushna Pasha: Pasture for the Soul, translated by Maria K. Arko Klemenc, Ph.D., edited by Rev. John P. Vidmar, Ph.D. (Bishop Baraga Association, 2019)
- The Diary of Bishop Frederic Baraga: First Bishop of Marquette, Michigan, translated by Joseph Gregorich and Rev. Paul Prud'homme, S.J., edited and annotated by Regis M. Walling and Rev. N. Daniel Rupp (Wayne State University Press, 2001)

== Legacy and veneration ==
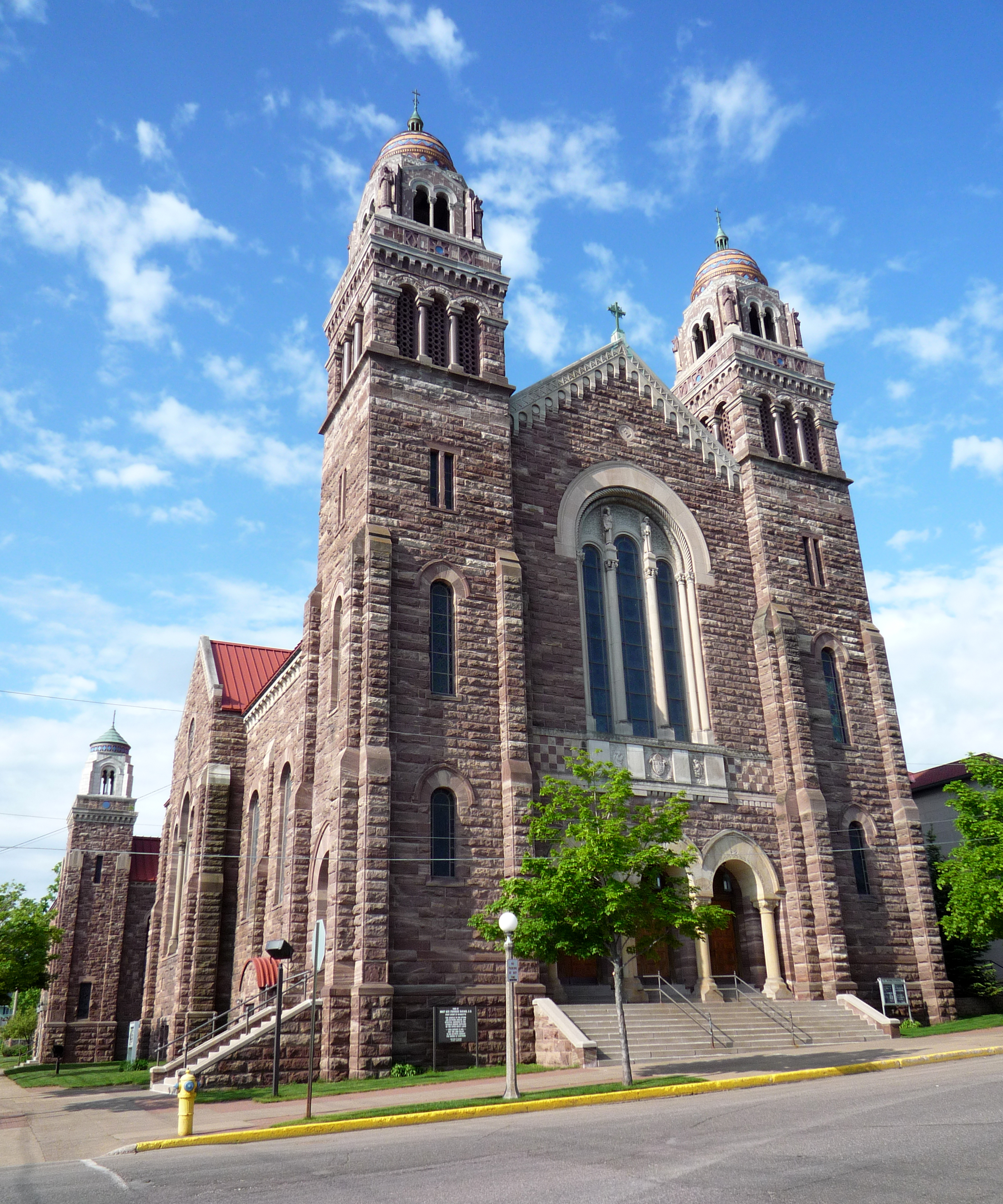
St. Peter Cathedral, Marquette. Michigan (2009)

Baraga was declared venerable by Pope Benedict XVI on May 10, 2012. His cause was opened in 1952 by Bishop Thomas Lawrence Noa. The canonization process began in 1973. The diocese moved his remains to a new chapel for veneration in the upper portion of Saint Peter Cathedral. At the time of his veneration, the Vatican was investigating a possible miracle for beatification.

The following places and institutions have been named after Baraga

- The village of Baraga, Baraga Township, Baraga County, and Baraga State Park, all in Michigan
- Baraga Street, Milwaukee, Wisconsin
- Baraga Street, Marquette
- Bishop Baraga Catholic School, Iron Mountain, Michigan
- Bishop Baraga Catholic School, Cheboygan, Michigan

== Other memorials ==
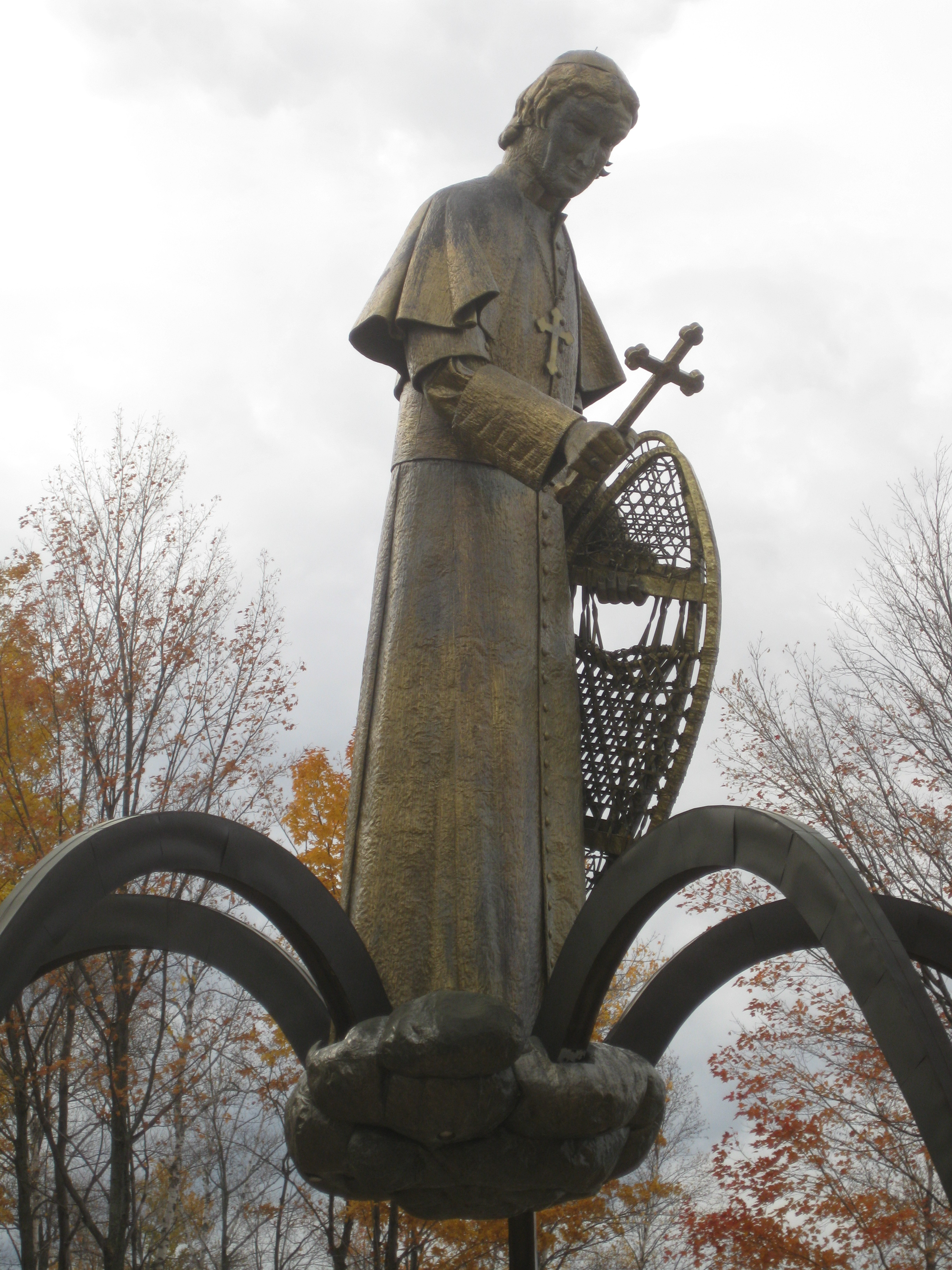
Snowshoe Priest statue by Jack Anderson (2008)

- The Diocese of Ljubljana began construction of the Baraga Seminary in Ljubljana in 1936. However, the building was unfinished on the outbreak of World War II in 1941.
- Our Lady of Sorrows Church in Goulais Bay, Ontario, was built by Baraga. It is marked with an Ontario Provincial plaque
- Snowshoe Priest, a memorial sculpture by Jack E. Anderson, is located in L'Anse, Michigan.
- Father Baraga's Cross in Schroeder, Minnesota, is located the mouth of the Cross River. Baraga erected a wooden cross there to give thanks after surviving a stormy trip on Lake Superior.
- The Shrine of Our Lady of Guadalupe in La Crosse, Wisconsin, contains a shrine for Baraga.
- The Baraga statue in Grand Rapids, Michigan, honors his efforts in 1833 to establish the first Catholic mission there.
- Baraga is the namesake of a network of six Catholic radio stations serving northern Michigan and is based at originating station WTCK licensed to Charlevoix with its main studio located near the Cross in the Woods Catholic Shrine in Indian River.
- The U.S. Postal Service issued a 13-cent commemorative postcard honoring Baraga in 1984.

== Honors ==
- Honorary member, Superior Historical Society (1833).
- Honorary member, Historical Society of Michigan (1857(.

== Baraga House and Baraga Educational Center and Museum ==
The Baraga House in Marquette is home to the Baraga Educational Center and Museum. It was moved to its current location in 1872 . The house is the oldest standing building in Marquette. In 1958, the Baraga House was recognized as a state of Michigan historical site.

Baraga bought the original property from the Cleveland Iron Mining Company for $250 for construction of the first church in Marquette. It was completed in 1857. Mass was celebrated on the first floor and the second floor served as a rectory. The church was pastored by Reverend Sebastian Duroc, with Baraga visiting periodically. After the Vatican moved the diocesan see from Upper Michigan to Marquette in 1865, Baraga converted the house in 1866 into his bishop's residence. He lived there until his death in 1868. The Baraga House is now owned by the Diocese of Marquette. It contains artifacts, tools, and writings used by Baraga.

== Gallery ==
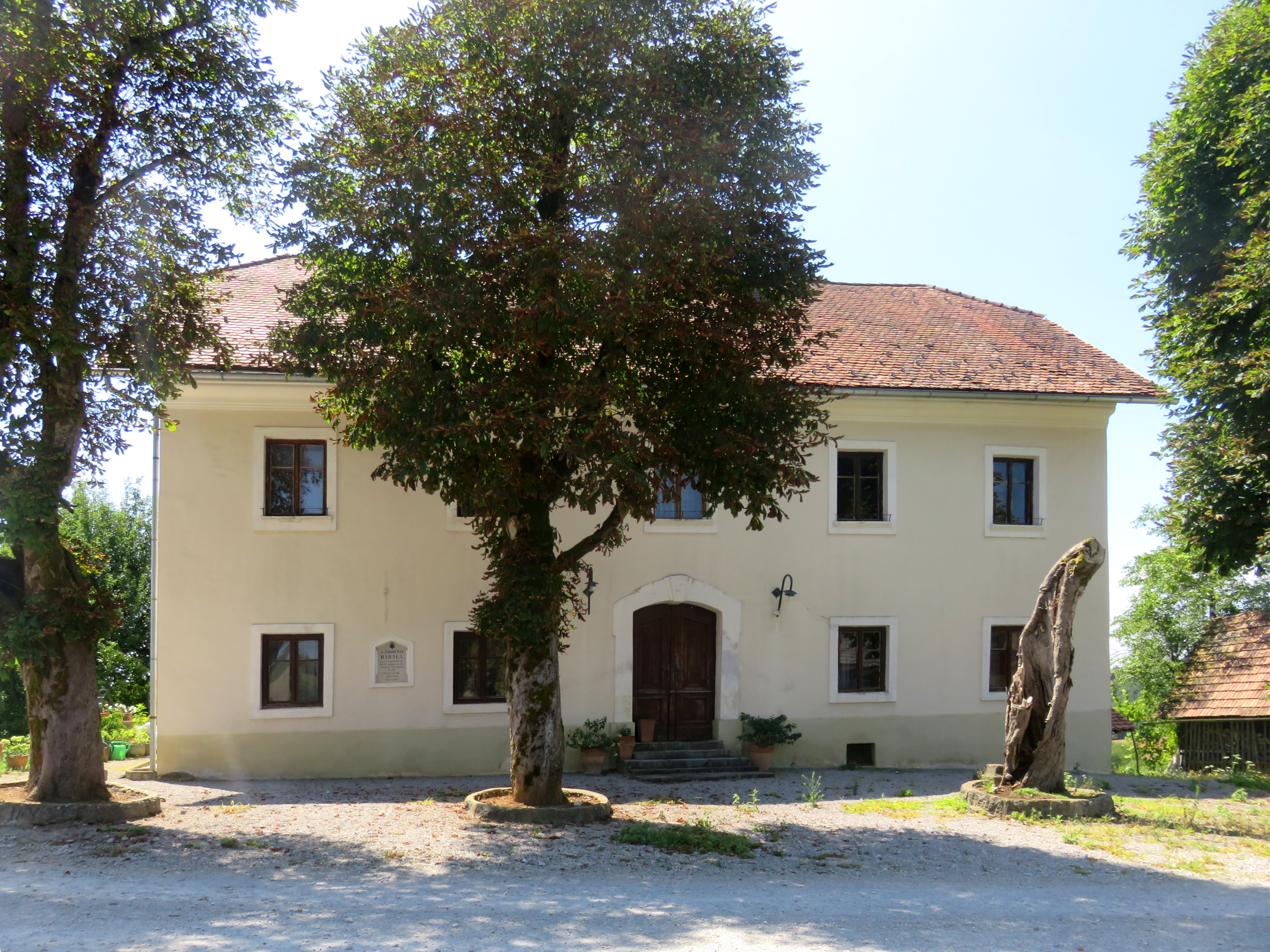
Mala Vas Manor, Baraga birthplace, Trebnje, Slovenia

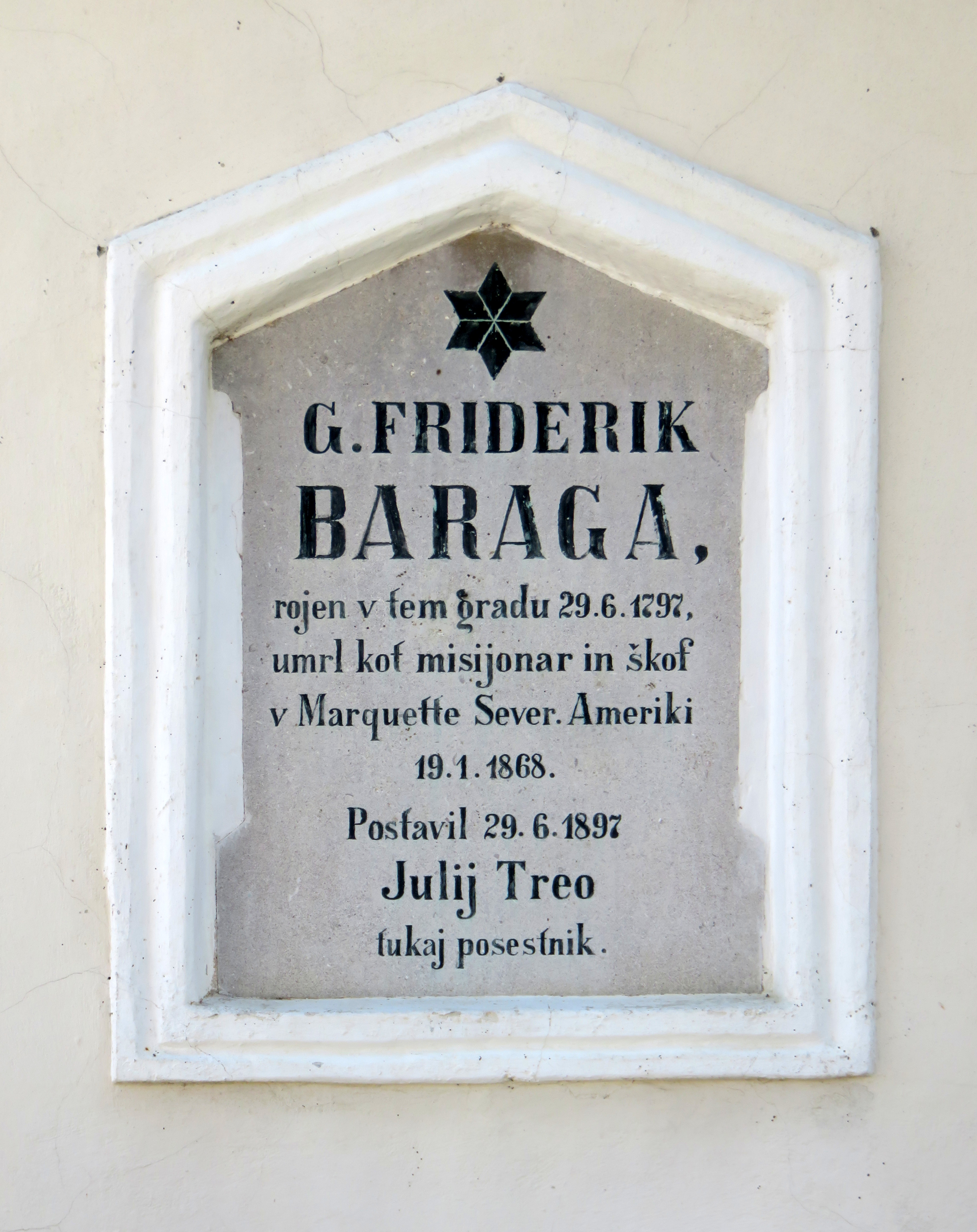
Plaque at Mala Vas Manor

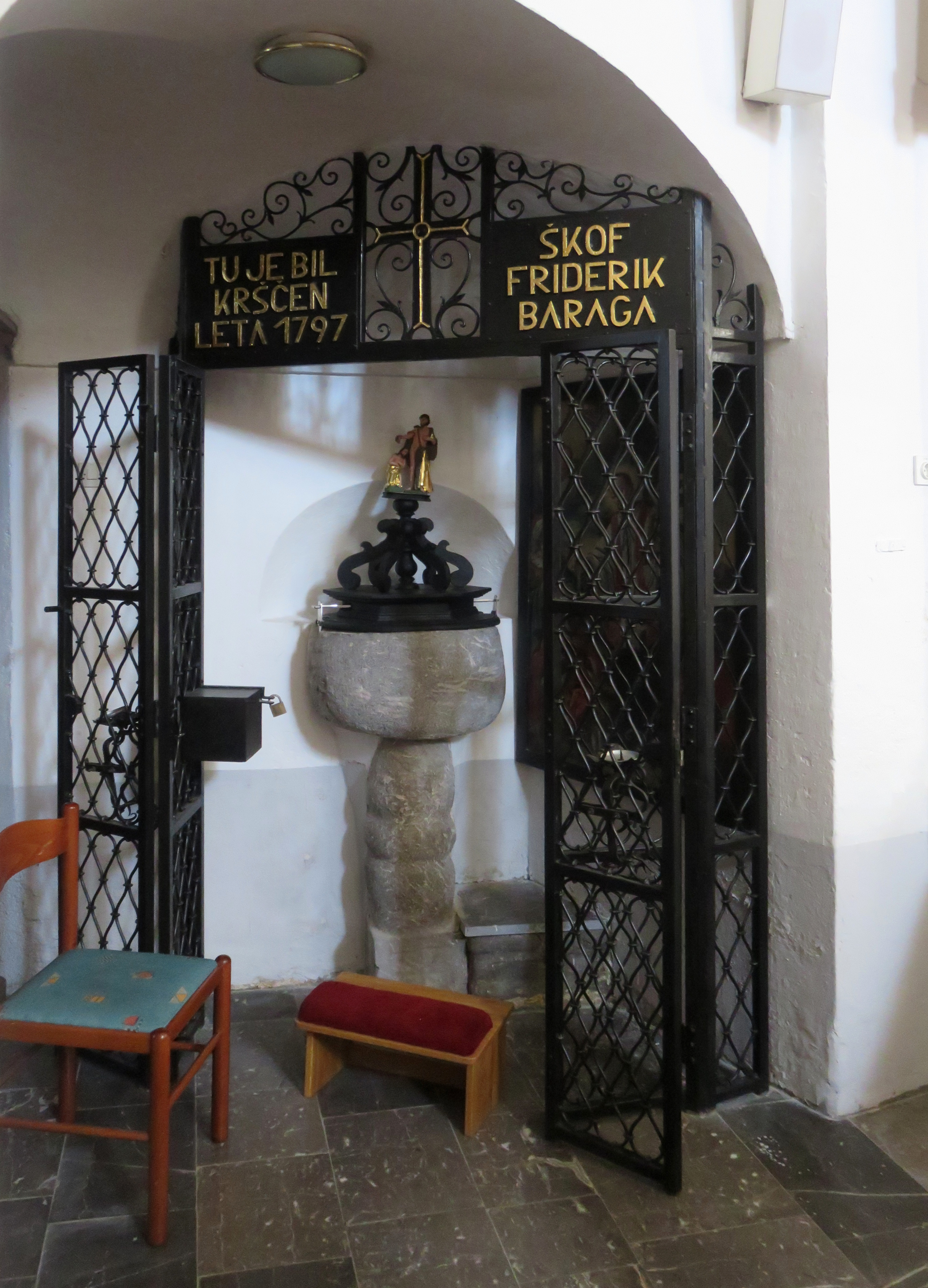
Baraga's baptismal font
