= Ralph Hauenstein =

American businessman

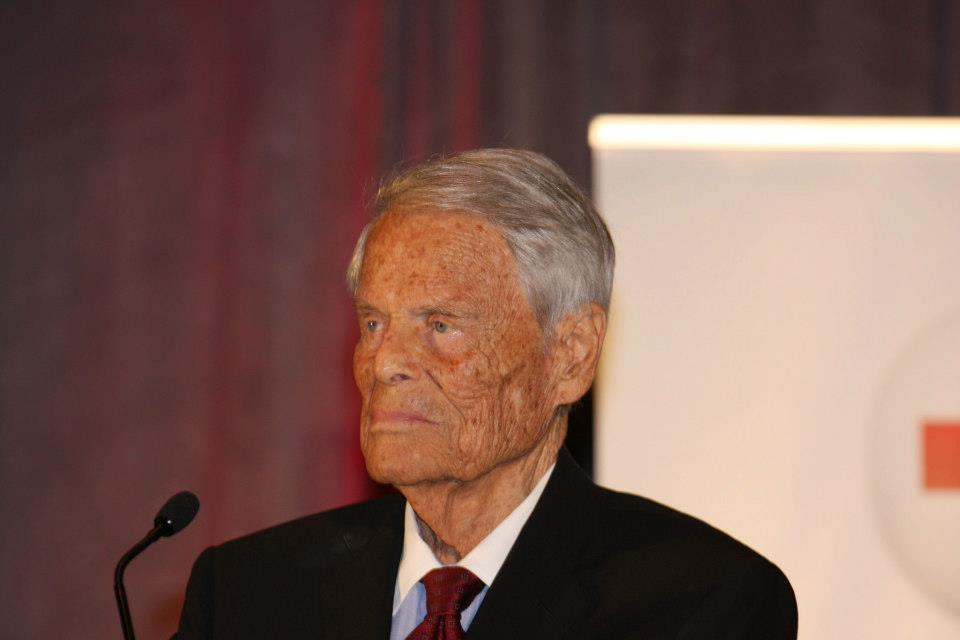
- Hauenstein in 2013
- Born: March 20, 1912; Fort Wayne, Indiana, U.S.
- Died: January 10, 2016 (aged 103); Grand Rapids, Michigan, U.S.
- Occupation(s): Businessman, newspaper editor
- Years active: 1935–2015
- Spouse: Grace Byrnes (m.1932–2007; her death)
- Children: 3

Ralph Hauenstein (March 20, 1912 – January 10, 2016) was an American philanthropist, army officer and business leader, best known as a newspaper editor. His leadership has produced institutions such as the Hauenstein Center for Presidential Studies at Grand Valley State University, the Hauenstein Parkinsons and Neuroscience Centers at Saint Mary's Hospital and the Grace Hauenstein Library at Aquinas College.

== Early life ==
Born in Fort Wayne, Indiana, in 1912, Hauenstein moved to Grand Rapids, Michigan at the age of twelve. In 1935, Hauenstein was commissioned in the U.S. Army as a second lieutenant and became commander of an all-African-American Civilian Conservation Corps camp in Michigan.

After two and one-half years on active duty, Hauenstein returned to civilian life and became city editor of the Grand Rapids Herald. In December 1940, one year before the attack on Pearl Harbor, he returned to active duty. During the Second World War, he rose to the rank of colonel and served under General Dwight D. Eisenhower as chief of the Intelligence Branch in the Army's European theater of operations. In 1945, he was among the first Americans into liberated Paris, Germany, and Nazi concentration camps. The destruction convinced him to work for better international relations and peaceful solutions to conflict.

== Post-war leadership and service ==
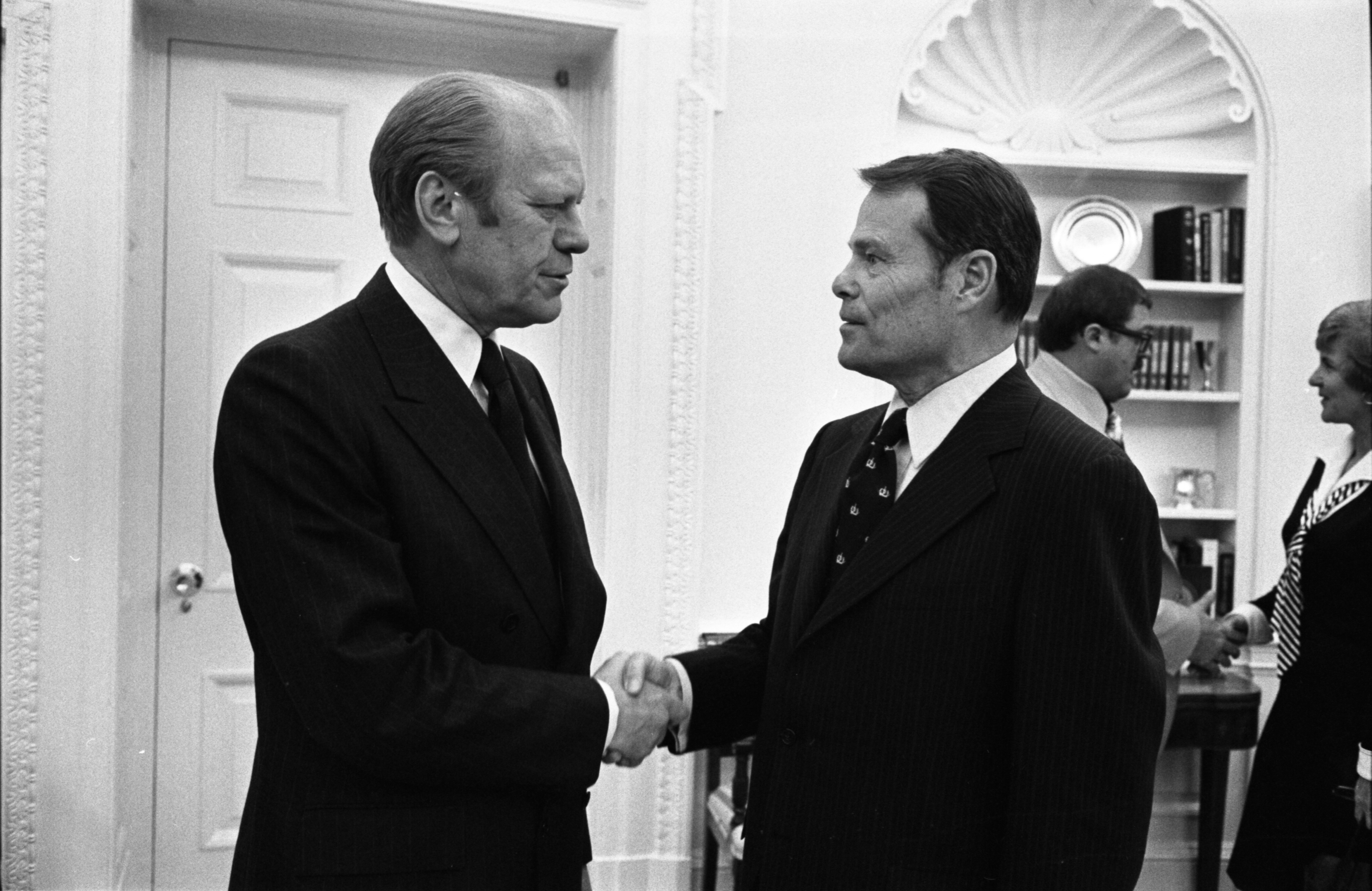
President Gerald R. Ford Shaking Hands with Ralph Hauenstein in the Oval Office in 1976.

After the war, Hauenstein saw opportunities to build bridges between the United States and Europe devastated by war. He went into international trade and partnered with European enterprises to provide goods and services to consumers in Europe, the Middle East, and elsewhere where democracies were struggling. He underwrote a modern bakery in Haiti, providing jobs for hundreds of workers and thousands of individual distributors at a difficult time in that nation's history. He also set up a school in Florida that taught people from developing countries how to run a fully automated bakery and provide good jobs in their local economy.

Hauenstein's leadership and service, however, went beyond the private sector. During the Dwight D. Eisenhower administration, Hauenstein served as a consultant on the President's Advisory Commission. He also served as an auditor at the Second Vatican Council in Rome and was part of the team that supervised the first free elections in Russia with the Jamestown Foundation in 1996.

== Philanthropy ==
Hauenstein contributed to numerous charitable causes. His philanthropic efforts can be seen in higher education institutions in the West Michigan area: at Grand Valley State University, his contribution made possible the founding of the Hauenstein Center for Presidential Studies, whose mission is to inspire a new generation of leaders devoted to public service. The Grace Hauenstein Library is a prominent fixture on the Grand Rapids campus of Aquinas College.

Hauenstein's philanthropy extended into the field of medicine. In December 2003, Hauenstein contributed $2 million to Saint Mary's Health Care to jump start a $15 million campaign to create a comprehensive Neurosciences Center on the campus. From this initial donation—and efforts to raise more money—the Mercy Health Hauenstein Neuroscience Center is a leader in the fight against this disease. Hauenstein was also one of three board members who established the Van Andel Institute for Medical Research in Grand Rapids and was one of its trustees.

== Later life and death ==
In 2013, Hauenstein donated $1 million to the Hauenstein Center in celebration of its 10th anniversary. Hauenstein turned 100 in March 2012 and died in his sleep of natural causes at his home in Grand Rapids, Michigan on January 10, 2016, at the age of 103. His funeral Mass was said on January 15 by Bishop David J. Walkowiak of the Diocese of Grand Rapids at the Cathedral of Saint Andrew.

== Leadership positions ==
- Colonel-United States Army
- Trustee-Van Andel Research Institute
- Trustee-Gerald R. Ford Foundation
- Trustee-Jamestown Foundation
- Founder-Hauenstein Center for Presidential Studies
- Founder-Hauenstein Parkinson's Center
- President/chairman-Werner Lehara Corporation
- President-Serra International

== Awards ==
Hauenstein was inducted into Omicron Delta Kappa honor society as an honoris causa initiate at Grand Valley State University in 2012. In 2013 he was honored with the Laurel Crowned Circle Award, the society's highest honor.

== Publications ==
Hauenstein, along with Donald Markle, authored a book about his role in the Allied efforts during World War II. Intelligence Was My Line: Inside Eisenhower's Other Command was published in 2005 by Hippocrene Books.
