= Joseph Schrembs =

German-born prelate (1866–1945)

His Excellency, The Most Reverend Joseph Schrembs
- Archbishop (personal title); Bishop of Cleveland
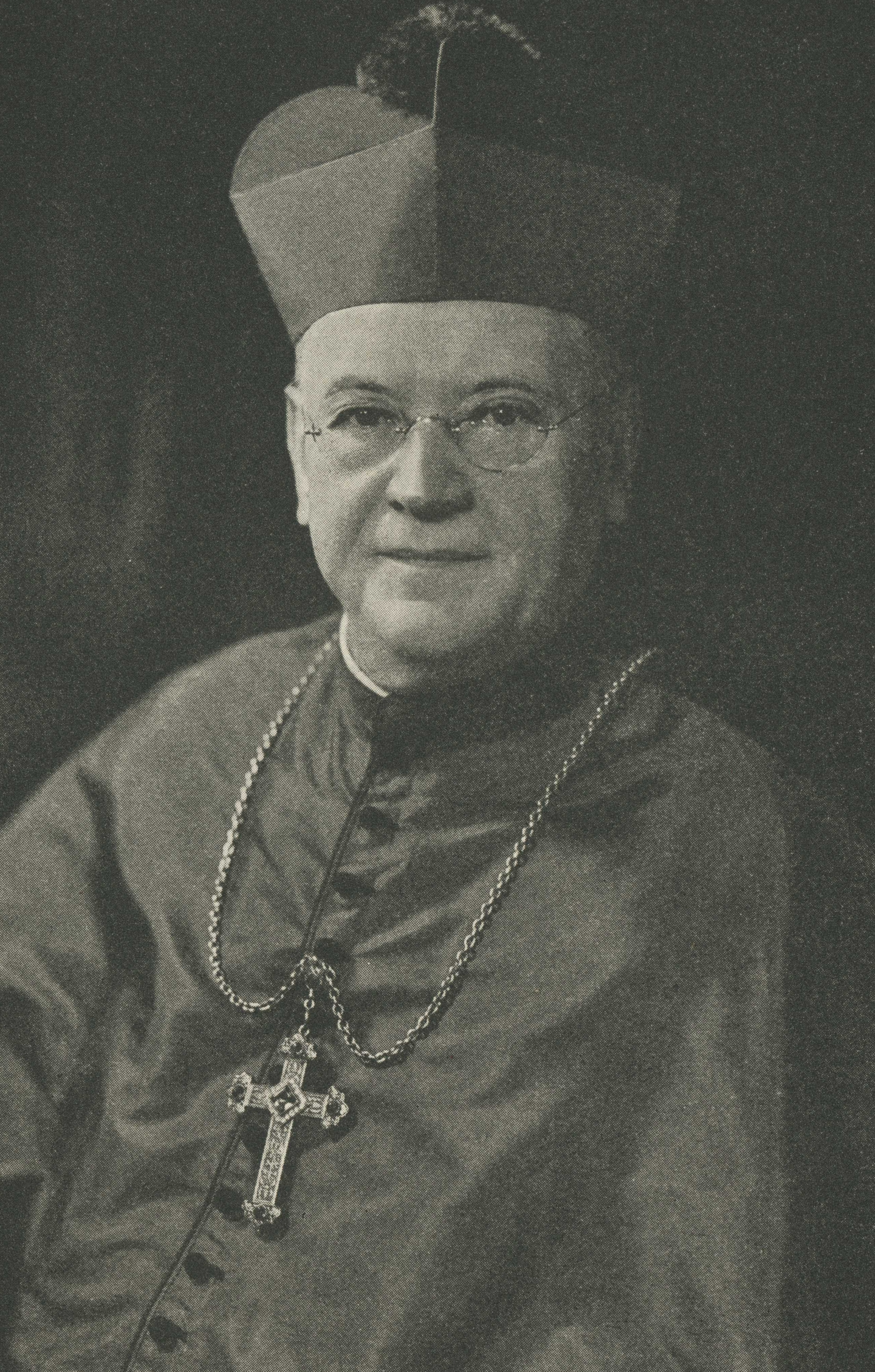
- Church: Catholic
- See: Diocese of Cleveland
- In office: June 16, 1921– November 2, 1945
- Predecessor: John Patrick Farrelly
- Successor: Edward Francis Hoban
- Previous posts: Auxiliary Bishop of Grand Rapids (February to August 1911); Bishop of Toledo (1911-1921)

Orders
- Ordination: June 29, 1889 by Henry Richter
- Consecration: February 22, 1911 by Henry Richter, Camillus Paul Maes and John Samuel Foley

Personal details
- Born: March 12, 1866 Wutzlhofen, Kingdom of Bavaria (now Germany)
- Died: November 2, 1945 (aged 79) Cleveland, Ohio, USA
- Buried: Cathedral of St. John the Evangelist
- Coat of arms

Joseph Schrembs (March 12, 1866 – November 2, 1945) was a German-born prelate of the Catholic Church. He served as an auxiliary bishop of the Diocese of Grand Rapids in Michigan for five months in 1911, as bishop of the Diocese of Toledo in Ohio from 1911 to 1921, and as bishop of the Diocese of Cleveland in Ohio from 1921 to 1945.

== Biography ==
=== Early life and education ===
Joseph Schrembs was born in Wutzlhofen in the Kingdom of Bavaria (present day Germany) on March 12, 1866. He was one of sixteen children born to George and Mary (née Gäß) Schrembs. Joseph Schrembs received his early education in Regensburg.

In 1877, Schrembs immigrated to the United States under the patronage of Bishop Rupert Seidenbusch. He enrolled at St. Vincent's College in Latrobe, Pennsylvania, where his older brother Rudesind had become a Benedictine monk. After completing his classical course at St. Vincent's at age sixteen, Joseph Schrembs taught at the parochial school of St. Martin's Parish until 1884. He was then accepted as a seminarian by Bishop Henry Richter of the Diocese of Grand Rapids in Michigan. Richter sent him to study philosophy and theology at the Grand Seminary of Montreal in Montreal, Quebec. Schrembs returned to Grand Rapids, Michigan, in March 1889.

=== Ordination and ministry ===
Schrembs was ordained to the priesthood for the Diocese of Grand Rapids by Bishop Richter in Grand Rapids on June 29, 1889. After his ordination, Schrembs was assigned as a curate at St. Mary's Parish in Saginaw, Michigan. In 1895, he was transferred to serve as pastor at St. Mary of the Assumption Parish in West Bay City, Michigan. Schrembs preached at St. Mary in both English and French.

In 1900, Schrembs was appointed pastor of St. Mary's, a German language parish in Grand Rapids. While on a tour of Europe in 1902, Schrembs purchased a grotto of Our Lady of Lourdes, which he donated to the parish.

In addition to his role as pastor, Schrembs was named vicar general of the diocese in 1903. During the 1905 flood of the Grand River in southern Michigan, he used the school at St. Mary's as a disaster relief center. In 1905, Schrembs built a new convent for the sisters. In January 1906, he was raised to the rank of domestic prelate by Pope Pius X. After the 1906 San Francisco earthquake, Schrembs took up collections to aid the survivors there.

=== Auxiliary Bishop of Grand Rapids ===
On January 8, 1911, Schrembs was appointed as an auxiliary bishop of Grand Rapids and titular bishop of Sophene by Pius X. He received his episcopal consecration at the Cathedral of Saint Andrew in Grand Rapids, Michigan, on February 22, 1911, from Bishop Richter, with Bishops Camillus Maes and John Foley serving as co-consecrators.

=== Bishop of Toledo ===
On August 11, 1911, only months after becoming auxiliary bishop of Grand Rapids, Pope Pius X appointed Schrembs as the first bishop of the newly erected Diocese of Toledo. Schrembs requested the Sisters of Saint Francis of Rochester, Minnesota send nuns to the Toledo area to work with the children of the Polish immigrants. Sister Adelaide Sandusky, director of the College of St. Teresa, and 22 other Sisters established a home in Toledo and began teaching in area schools. This community became the Sisters of St. Francis of Sylvania, Ohio From 1911 to 1921, Schrembs established 13 new parishes and 33 schools. At Schrembs' invitation, Visitation nuns came to Toledo in 1915 from their Georgetown monastery in Washington, D.C.

In 1912, Schrembs led the fundraising to build a hospital in Tiffin, Ohio. Seven acres of land were purchased for the construction of a four-story fireproof building. Tiffin Hospital, now Mercy Health Tiffin Hospital opened in 1913.

In a 1914 sermon in Baltimore, at a meeting of the American Federation of Catholic Societies, Schrembs criticized the U.S. Government for not doing anything to protect Catholics from violence during the Mexican Revolution. After the American entry into World War I in 1917, he served on the Administrative Committee of the National Catholic War Council.

=== Bishop of Cleveland ===
On June 16, 1921, Schrembs was appointed the fifth bishop of Cleveland by Pope Pius XI . In 1924, Schrembs offered the invocation on the third day of the 1924 Republican National Convention in Cleveland. He characterized Republican President Calvin Coolidge as;

"a chieftain whose record of faithful public service, and whose personality, untarnished and untainted by the pollution of political corruption, will fill the heart of America with the new hope of a second spring."

In 1925, Pope Pius XI presented the relics of Saint Christine to Schrembs. Christine was a 13-year-old girl who died as a martyr around 300 AD. Her relics were moved from the Roman catacombs to St. John's Cathedral in Cleveland. The diocese had previously donated money to the Vatican for the establishment of the House of Catacombs outside Rome. Schrembs promoted the cause for canonization of Kateri Tekakwitha, a 17th-century Native American woman from what is today Upstate New York who converted to Catholicism. Tekakwitha was proclaimed a saint by Pope Benedict XVI in October 2012.

Pope Pius XII gave Schrembs the personal title of archbishop on March 25, 1939. In 1940, he placed Holy Redeemer Parish in Cleveland under interdict for refusing to accept his appointment of a pastor. During his tenure, Schrembs erected 27 parishes in Cleveland and 35 outside the city. In 1942, as Schrembs' diabetes worsened, Pius XII named Bishop Edward Hoban as Schrembs' coadjutor bishop to help him with his duties.

Joseph Schrembs died on November 2, 1945, in Cleveland at age 79.

== Viewpoints ==
=== Temperance ===
In 1923, speaking to a meeting of the National Council of Catholic Women in Washington, D.C., Schrembs criticized the U.S. Government for spending millions of dollars trying to enforce Prohibition, the ban on alcoholic beverages in the United States. He said that the law, based on the Eighteenth amendment to the US Constitution, was unenforceable and that high officials were breaking the law themselves by consuming alcohol.

=== Public morality ===
In 1927, in an address to the National Council of Catholic Women in Washington, D.C. Schrembs charged that a large group of "Godless Jews combined nationally and internationally in activities in the amusement world, the results of which were to menace public morality." Schrembs tried to temper his remarks by claiming that he had "...the utmost respect for the Jewish race" and that many "right-minded Jews" also opposed these threats to public morality.

When fan dancer Sally Rand rode in Cleveland's St. Patrick's Day parade in 1937 next to a float dedicated to the Virgin Mary, Schrembs declared, "I am deeply humiliated and ashamed...[Rand's] inclusion does not represent the mind of the great Irish people."

=== Eugenics ===
In 1928, physicist Charles F. Brush, an advocate of eugenics, established the Brush Foundation in Cleveland. In a statement, Brush advocated birth control as a means of the "betterment of the human stock" and population control. He specifically mentioned preventing the births of babies with physical and mental disabilities. Schrembs condemned Brush's remarks, saying,

"In older times we referred to humans as the human race, but according to this foundation we are being classed with the animals on the farm, the cow, the horse, the mule...According to this foundation, I have no right to be born, for I am the youngest of 16 children and God bless my mother for every one of them!"

=== Fascism ===
In August 1936, Schrembs expressed his admiration for Italian dictator Benito Mussolini and his Fascist regime in Italy:

I admire what fascism has done for Italy. There is no doubt that Mussolini saved Italy from communism and has made this one of the front rank countries of Europe.

== See also ==
- Catholic Church hierarchy
- Catholic Church in the United States
- Historical list of the Catholic bishops of the United States
- List of the Catholic bishops of the United States
- Lists of patriarchs, archbishops, and bishops

== Episcopal succession ==
Catholic Church titles
Preceded by John Patrick Farrelly	Bishop of Cleveland; 1921–1945	Succeeded by Edward Francis Hoban
Preceded by none	Bishop of Toledo; 1911–1921	Succeeded by Samuel Stritch
Preceded by –	Auxiliary Bishop of Grand Rapids; 1911–1911	Succeeded by –
