= List of churches in the Diocese of Grand Rapids =

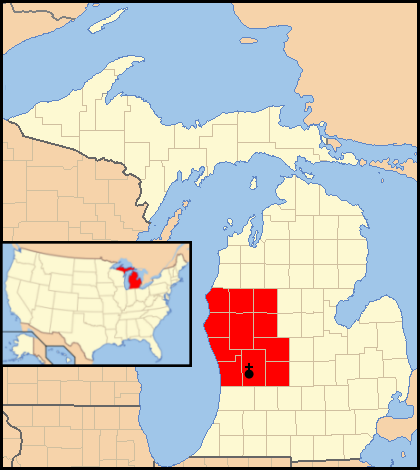
Diocese of Grand Rapids in red

This is a list of current and former Roman Catholic churches in the Roman Catholic Diocese of Grand Rapids. The diocese is located in the western portion of Michigan's lower peninsula and includes the city of Grand Rapids and 11 counties: Ionia, Kent, Lake, Mason, Mecosta, Montcalm, Muskegon, Newaygo, Oceana, Osceola, and Ottawa.

The cathedral church of the diocese is the Cathedral of Saint Andrew in Grand Rapids.

== Kent County ==
=== Grand Rapids ===
Name	Image	Location	Description/notes
Basilica of Saint Adalbert	Basilica of St. Adalbert	654 Davis Ave NW, Grand Rapids	Romanesque Revival church built between 1907 and 1913
Blessed Sacrament	Blessed Sacrament-GR	2275 Diamond Ave NE, Grand Rapids	Established in 1946
Cathedral of Saint Andrew	File:ORDINATION2012 455	215 Sheldon Blvd SE, Grand Rapids	Gothic Revival church built between 1875 and 1876
Holy Spirit	Holy Spirit-GR	2230 Lake Michigan Dr NW, Grand Rapids	Established in 1952.
Immaculate Heart of Mary	Immaculate Heart of Mary-GR	1935 Plymouth Ave SE, Grand Rapids	Established in 1948
Latvian Apostolate	Latvian Apostolate	504 Grand Ave NE, Grand Rapids	Established in 1951
Our Lady of Sorrows	Our Lady of Sorrows-GR	101 Hall St SE, Grand Rapids	Established in 1908
Sacred Heart of Jesus	Sacred Heart-Grand Rapids	156 Valley Ave SW, Grand Rapids	Established in 1904
St. Alphonsus	St. Alphonsus	224 Carrier St NE, Grand Rapids	Established in 1888
St. Anthony of Padua	St. Anthony of Padua-GR	2510 Richmond NW, Grand Rapids	Established in 1906
St. Isidore	St. Isidore	628 Diamond Ave NE, Grand Rapids	Established in 1897
St. Jude	St. Jude	1120 Four Mile NE, Grand Rapids	Established in 1946
St. Mary		423 First St NW, Grand Rapids	Established in 1857; cornerstone laid in 1873
St. Paul the Apostle	St. Paul the Apostle-GR	2750 Burton St SE, Grand Rapids	Established in 1965
St. Stephen	St. Stephen	750 Gladstone Dr SE, Grand Rapids	Established in 1924
St. Thomas the Apostle	St. Thomas the Apostle	1449 Wilcox Park Dr SE, Grand Rapids	Established in 1924
Ss. Peter and Paul	Ss. Peter and Paul	520 Myrtle St NW, Grand Rapids	Established in 1904
Shrine of St. Francis Xavier & Our Lady of Guadalupe	Shrine of St. Francis Xavier & Our Lady of Guadalupe	250 Brown St SE, Grand Rapids	Established in 1914; merged with St. Dominic Parish in Wyoming

=== Outside Grand Rapids ===
Name	Image	Location	Description/notes
Assumption of the Blessed Virgin Mary	Assumption of the Blessed Virgin Mary-Belmont	6390 Belmont Ave NW, Belmont	Established in 1914
Holy Family	Holy Family-Caledonia	9669 Kraft Ave, Caledonia	Established in 1970
St. John Paul II	St. John Paul II-Cedar Springs	3110 17 Mile Rd, Cedar Springs	Established in 2013
Holy Trinity	Holy Trinity-Comstock Park	1200 Alpine Church Rd NW, Comstock Park	Established in 1848
St. Clara Chapel	St. Clara Chapel	4584 N Bailey Rd, Coral	Part of Mary Queen of Apostles Parish, Sand Lake
St. Margaret Chapel	File:St. Margaret Chapel-Cedar Springs	10195 16 Mile Rd NE, Cedar Springs	Merged with St. John Paul II
St. Mary Magdalen	St. Mary Magdalen-Kentwood	1253 52nd St SE, Kentwood	Established in 1956
St. Patrick	St Patrick's Catholic Church, Parnell MI	4351 Parnell Ave NE, Parnell	Established in 1844
Our Lady of Consolation	Our Lady of Consolation-Rockford	4865 Eleven Mile Rd, Rockford	Established in 1972
Mary Queen of Apostles	Mary Queen of Apostles-Sand Lake	One W Maple St, Sand Lake	Established in 1923
Holy Family	Holy Family-Sparta	425 S State St, Sparta	Established in 1947
Holy Name of Jesus	Holy Name of Jesus-Wyoming	1630 Godfrey Ave SW, Wyoming	Established in 1908
Our Lady of La-Vang	Our Lady of La-Vang-Wyoming	2019 Porter SW, Wyoming	Established in 1999
St. Dominic	St. Dominic-Wyoming	50 Bellevue St SW, Wyoming	Merged with the Shrine of St. Francis Xavier and Our Lady of Guadalupe Parish
St. John Vianney	St. John Vianney-Wyoming	4101 Clyde Park Ave SW, Wyoming	Established in 1942
St. Joseph the Worker	St. Joseph the Worker-Wyoming	225 32nd St SW, Wyoming	Established in 1887

== East Diocese (Ionia and Montcalm Counties) ==
Name	Image	Location	Description/notes
St. Joseph	St. Joseph-Belding	409 S Bridge St, Belding	Established in 1894; re-established 2012 as St. Joseph-St. Mary; clustered with St. Charles Borromeo Parish
St. Mary Chapel	St. Mary-Chapel-Belding	9041 Krupp Rd, Belding	Merged with St. Joseph; clustered with St. Charles Borromeo Parish
St. Mary	St. Mary-Carson City	404 N Division St, Carson City	Established in 1896; current church built in 1896; now clustered with St. John the Baptist Parish, Hubbardston
St. Margaret Mary Alacoque	St. Margaret Mary Alacoque-Edmore	1051 E Howard City Rd, Edmore	Merged in 2012 with St. Bernardette Parish in Stanton
St. Charles Borromeo	St. Charles Borromeo-Greenville	505 S Lafayette St, Greenville	Established in 1875
Christ the King	Christ the King-Howard City	9596 N Reed Rd, Howard City	Established in 1975; reestablished 2011 as Christ the King-St. Francis de Sales Parish
St. John the Baptist		324 S Washington St, Hubbardston	Established in 1853; church built in 1868; now clustered with St. Mary Parish in Carson City
Ss. Peter and Paul	Ss. Peter and Paul-Ionia	434 High St, Ionia	Established in 1860
St. Edward	St. Edward-Lake Odessa	531 Jordan Lake St, Lake Odessa	Established in 1945
St. Francis de Sales	St. Francis de Sales-Lakeview	829 E Richardson, Lakeview	Merged with Christ the King Parish in 2011
St. Mary	St. Mary-Lowell	402 Amity St, Lowell	Established in 1879
St. Joseph		126 East St, Pewamo	Established in 1903
St. Patrick	St. Patrick-Portland	520 W Grand River, Portland	Established in 1878
St. Anthony	St. Anthony-Saranac	6700 David Hwy, Saranac	Established in 1951
St. Bernadette of Lourdes	St. Bernadette of Lourdes-Stanton	991 Main St, Stanton	Merged in 2012 with St. Margaret Parish of Edmore

== Mid Diocese (Mecosta, Newaygo and Oceana Counties) ==
Name	Image	Location	Description/notes
St. Mary	St. Mary-Big Rapids	1009 Marion Ave, Big Rapids	Established in 1873
St. Paul Campus Church		1 Damascus Rd, Big Rapids	Serves the Ferris State University community
St. Michael	St. Michaels-Brunswick	6382 S. Maple Island Rd, Brunswick	Established in 1885
St. John the Baptist	St. John the Baptist-Claybanks	6800 South 50th Ave, Claybanks	Established in 1886
Kateri Tekakwitha Native American Center	Kateri Tekakwitha-Hart	3802 N 144th Ave, Elbridge	Established in 1891
All Saints	All Saints-Fremont	500 Iroquois Dr, Fremont	Established in 1901
St. Gregory	St. Gregory-Hart	316 Peach Ave, Hart	Established in 1908; reestablished in 2014 as St. Gregory-Our Lady of Fatima Church upon merger with parish in Shelby
Christ the King Chapel	Christ the King Chapel-Hesperia	263 S Elm St, Hesperia	Established in 1902; merged with St Michael Parish in Brunswick
St. Bartholomew	St. Bartholomew-Newago	599 W Brooks St, Newaygo	Established in 1902
St. Anne	St. Anne-Paris	23949 22 Mile Rd, Paris	Established in 1889
St. Vincent Chapel	St. Vincent Chapel-Pentwater	637 E 6th St, Pentwater	Merged with St. Joseph Parish in Weare
St. Michael the Archangel	File:St. Michael the Archangle-Remus	8929 50th Ave, Remus	Established in 1888
Our Lady of the Assumption	Our Lady of Assumption-Rothbury	3000 Winston Rd, Rothbury	Established in 1923
Our Lady of Fatima	Our Lady of Fatima-Shelby	1372 S. Oceana Dr, Shelby	Merged in 2014 with St. Gregory Parish in Hart
St. Joseph	St. Joseph-Weare	2380 W Jackson St, Weare	Established in 1884
St. Joseph	St. Joseph-White Cloud	965 Newell St, White Cloud	Established in 1892

== North Diocese (Lake, Mason and Osceola Counties) ==
Name	Image	Location	Description/notes
St. Ann	St. Ann-Baldwin	1001 Michigan Ave, Baldwin	Established in 1916; merged in 2011 to form St. Mary-St. Ignatius Parish
St. Mary's	St. Mary-Custer	85 S Madison, Custer	Established in 1933; merged in 2012 to form St. Mary-St. Jerome Parish
Sacred Heart	Sacred Heart-Evart	9878 US-10, Evart	Established in 1960
St. John Cantius	St. John Cantius-Free Soil	2845 E Michigan Ave, Free Soil	Established in 1906
St. Bernard	St. Bernard-Irons	5734 10-1/2 Mile Rd, Irons	Established in 1948
St. Simon	St. Simon-Ludington	702 E Bryant Rd, Ludington	Established in 1876
St. Ignatius Chapel	St. Ignatius Chapel-Luther	701 State St, Luther	Merged in 2011 with St. Ann Parish in Baldwin
St. Agnes	St. Agnes-Marion	603 E Main St, Marion	Established in 1972
St. Philip Neri	St. Philip Neri	831 S Chestnut, Reed City	Established in 1880

== West Diocese (Muskegon and Ottawa Counties) ==
Name	Image	Location	Description/notes
St. Luke University Parish	St. Luke University Parish	10144 42nd Ave, Allendale	Established in 2007 at Grand Valley State University
St. Francis Xavier	St. Francis Xavier-Conklin	2044 Gooding Rd, Conklin	Established in 1892
Our Lady of the Lake	Our Lady of the Lake-Holland	480 152nd Ave, Holland	Established in 1979
St. Francis de Sales	St. Francis de Sales-Holland	171 W 13th St, Holland	Established in 1903
Holy Redeemer	Holy Redeemer-Jenison	2700 Baldwin St, Jenison	Established in 1975
St. Mary of the Woods Chapel	St. Mary of the Woods Chaqpel-Lakewood Club	150 Church St, Lakewood Club	Merged with Prince of Peace Parish
St. Mary	St. Mary Marne	15164 Juniper Dr, Marne	Established in 1852; clustered with St. Michael Parish in Coopersville
St. James	St. James-Montague	5149 Dowling St, Montague	Established in 1876
St. Mary's Church of the Immaculate Conception	St. Mary's Church of the Immaculate Conception	196 W Webster Ave, Muskegon	Established in 1856; current church built in 1889; reestablished by merger with Our Lady of Grace and St. Jean Baptiste
St. Patrick/St. Anthony		920 Fulton Street, Grand Haven	Established in 1857
St. Michael the Archangel	St. Michael the Archangel-Muskegon	1716 Sixth St, Muskegon	Established in 1909
St. Thomas the Apostle	St. Thomas the Apostle-Muskegon	3252 Apple Ave, Muskegon Twp.	Established in 1948
Prince of Peace	Prince of Peace-North Muskegon	1110 Dykstra Rd, North Muskegon	Established in 1975; reestablished 2012; merged with St. Mary of the Woods
St. Francis de Sales		2929 McCracken Ave, Norton Shores	Established in 1948
St. Catherine		3376 Thomas St, Ravenna	Established in 1908
St. Mary	St. Mary-Spring Lake	403 E Savidge St, Spring Lake	Established in 1863
St. Joseph	St. Joseph-Wright	18784 8th Ave, Wright	Established in 1850

== Former churches ==
Name	Image	Location	Description/notes
Our Lady of Grace	Our Lady of Grace-Muskegon	451 S Getty St, Muskegon	Built between 1949 and 1950; merged with St. Mary Parish in 2018, closed in 2023
Sacred Heart	Sacred Heart-Muskegon Heights	150 E Summit Ave, Muskegon Heights	Established in 1919, closed in 2023
St. James	St. James-Grand Rapids	733 Bridge St NW, Grand Rapids	Church built between 1870 and 1872; merged with the Basilica of St. Adalbert. St. James closed in 2022.
St. Jean Baptiste		1292 Jefferson St, Muskegon	Established in 1883; merged with St. Mary's in 2012, closed in 2015 and building sold in 2017, slated for demolition in spring of 2024
St. Jerome	St. Jerome-Scottville	203 West State St, Scottville	Merged in 2012 with St. Mary Parish in Custer and closed shortly after around 2014
Saint Joseph		1224 5th Street, Muskegon	Established in 1883, closed and demolished in the 1990s, now Saint Joseph Park
