= Aldrich Godfrey and White Block =

- Aldrich, Godfrey, and White Block
- U.S. National Register of Historic Places
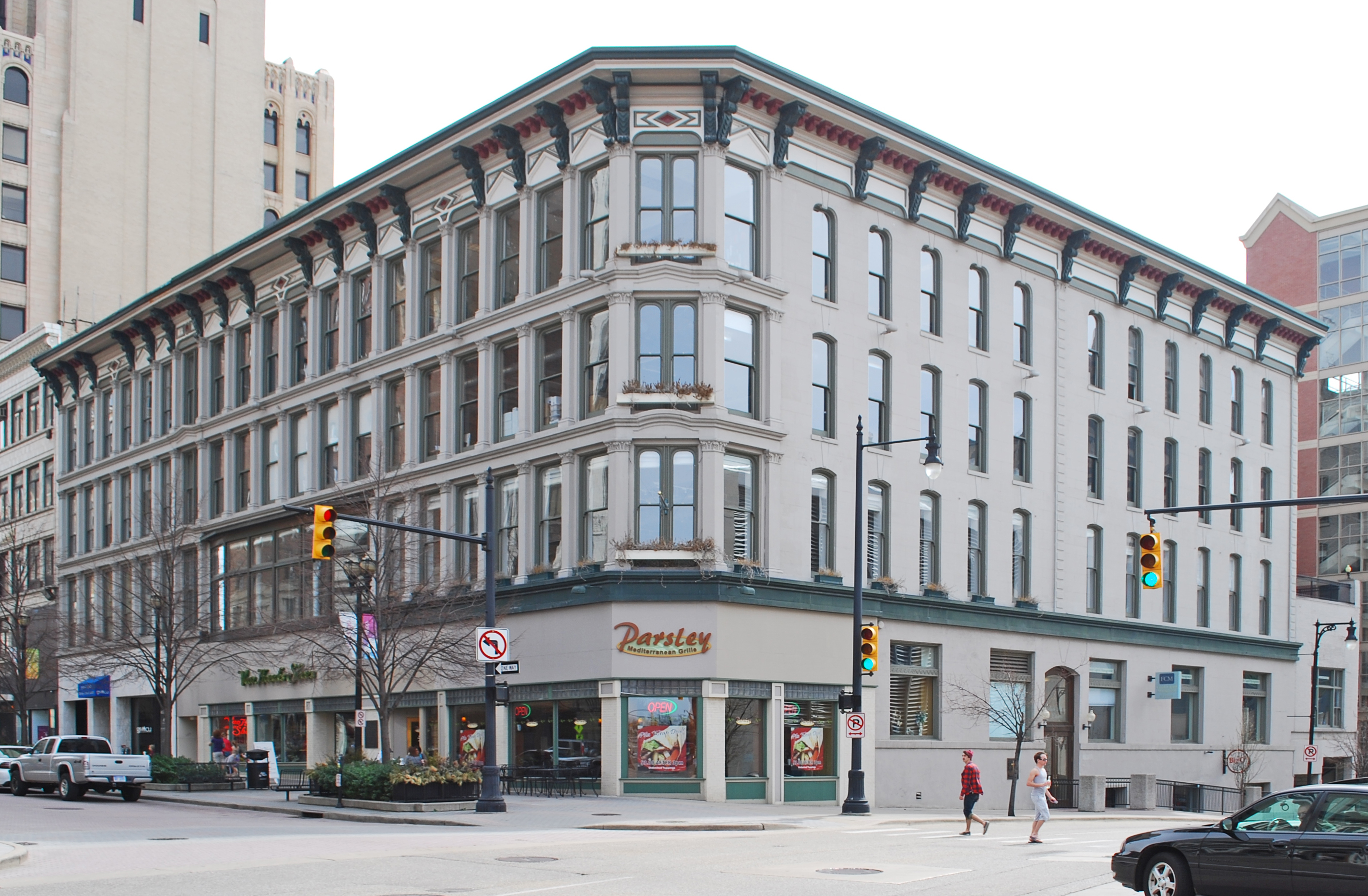
- Interactive map
- Location: 89-99 Monroe Center, Grand Rapids, Michigan
- Coordinates: 42°57′53″N 85°40′13″W
- Area: less than one acre
- Built: 1874
- Built by: Farr & Vincent
- Architect: John Grady
- Architectural style: Italianate
- NRHP reference No.: 99000052
- Added to NRHP: January 27, 1999

The Aldrich, Godfrey, and White Block is a commercial building located at 89-99 Monroe Center in Grand Rapids, Michigan. It was listed on the National Register of Historic Places in 1999.

== History ==
The Aldrich, Godfrey, and White Block was constructed and owned by three prominent Grand Rapids civic leaders: Moses V. Aldrich, Freeman Godfrey, and George H. White. Moses V. Aldfich was born in Macedon, New York in 1829, and came to Grand Rapids in 1855 to enter into partnership with his father-in-law in a manufacturing firm. The business thrived, and Aldrich went into banking and real estate, as well as serving as mayor of Grand Rapids for consecutive terms in 1868 - 1870. Freeman Godfrey was born in Vershire, Vermont in 1825, and worked as a contractor laying track for the railroads beginning in 1851. In 1856 he arrived in Grand Rapids to construct a line for the Detroit and Milwaukee Railroad (later the Detroit, Grand Haven and Milwaukee Railway), and in 1858 began work on the Grand Rapids and Indiana Railroad. In 1860, Godfrey opened a gypsum quarry in Grand Rapids with his brother, and in 1865 bought a one-third share of a plaster quarry and mills owned by George H. White and Company. George H. White was born in 1822 and came to Grand Rapids from western New York in 1842. He began as a clerk and then partner in the general store of Amos Rathbone. The partners also owned land, and in the 1870s began developing in the city of Grand Rapids.

In 1872, Moses V. Aldrich purchased the property where this building now stands from St. Andrew's Catholic Church for $56,000, which funded the church's move to what is now St. Andrew's Cathedral. Aldrich sold one-third of the property each to George H. White and Freeman Godfrey. The three men hired local architect John Grady to design a commercial block at the site. In 1874, the old St. Andrew's was demolished and the firm of Farr & Vincent began construction on the new commercial block. It was completed at the end of the year, and new tenants began moving in in 1875.

The first tenants of the building included both business and residential renters. Residential spaces were discontinued in 1916. In 1948 the building was purchased by the Siegel Company, which sold women's clothing, and was renamed the Siegel Building. The building was redeveloped in 1999.

== Description ==
The Aldrich, Godfrey, and White Block is four story Italianate structure post and beam construction, located on an entire city block with two main facades. The exterior brick walls are faced in Buena Vista sandstone on one main facade and in limestone on the other. The regularly spaced double-hing windows are separated by pilasters; windows on the fourth floor have pedimented hood moldings. The building is topped with an ornate projecting metal cornice. An entryway in one facade leads to the upper floors; above this are paired double-hung windows on each floor.
