= Walter A. Hurley =

Canadian-born American bishop (born 1937)

His Excellency, The Most Reverend Walter Allison Hurley
- Bishop Emeritus of Grand Rapids
- See: Diocese of Grand Rapids
- Appointed: June 21, 2005
- Installed: August 4, 2005
- Retired: April 18, 2013
- Predecessor: Kevin Michael Britt
- Successor: David John Walkowiak
- Previous posts: Auxiliary Bishop of Detroit; 2003 - 2005; Apostolic Administrator of Gaylord (2020)

Orders
- Ordination: June 5, 1965 by John Francis Dearden
- Consecration: August 12, 2003 by Adam Maida, Edmund Szoka, and Walter Joseph Schoenherr

Personal details
- Born: 30 May 1937 (age 89) Fredericton, New Brunswick, Canada
- Denomination: Roman Catholic
- Education: St. John's Provincial Seminary; Catholic University of America
- Motto: Serve with gladness (Psalm 100:2)

Styles of Walter Allison Hurley
- Reference style: His Excellency; The Most Reverend
- Spoken style: Your Excellency
- Religious style: Bishop

Walter Allison Hurley (born May 30, 1937) is a Canadian-born American Catholic prelate who served as bishop of the Diocese of Grand Rapids in Michigan from 2005 to 2013. He previously served as an auxiliary bishop for the Archdiocese of Detroit in Michigan from 2003 to 2005.

Hurley also served as apostolic administrator of the Diocese of Gaylord and the Diocese of Saginaw, both in Michigan.

== Biography ==
=== Early life and education ===
Walter Hurley was born on May 30, 1937, in Fredericton, New Brunswick, to Charles and Anne (née Ball) Hurley. One of six children, he has four sisters, Elizabeth, Eileen, Charlene, and Annette; and one brother, Gerald. He attended St. Dunstan Grade School in Fredericton, and St. Anne High School in Church Point, Nova Scotia.

In 1955, Hurley immigrated to the United States, settling in Detroit. He earned a Bachelor of Arts degree from Sacred Heart Seminary in Detroit in 1961, and a Master of Divinity degree from St. John's Provincial Seminary in Plymouth, Michigan, in 1965.

=== Priesthood ===
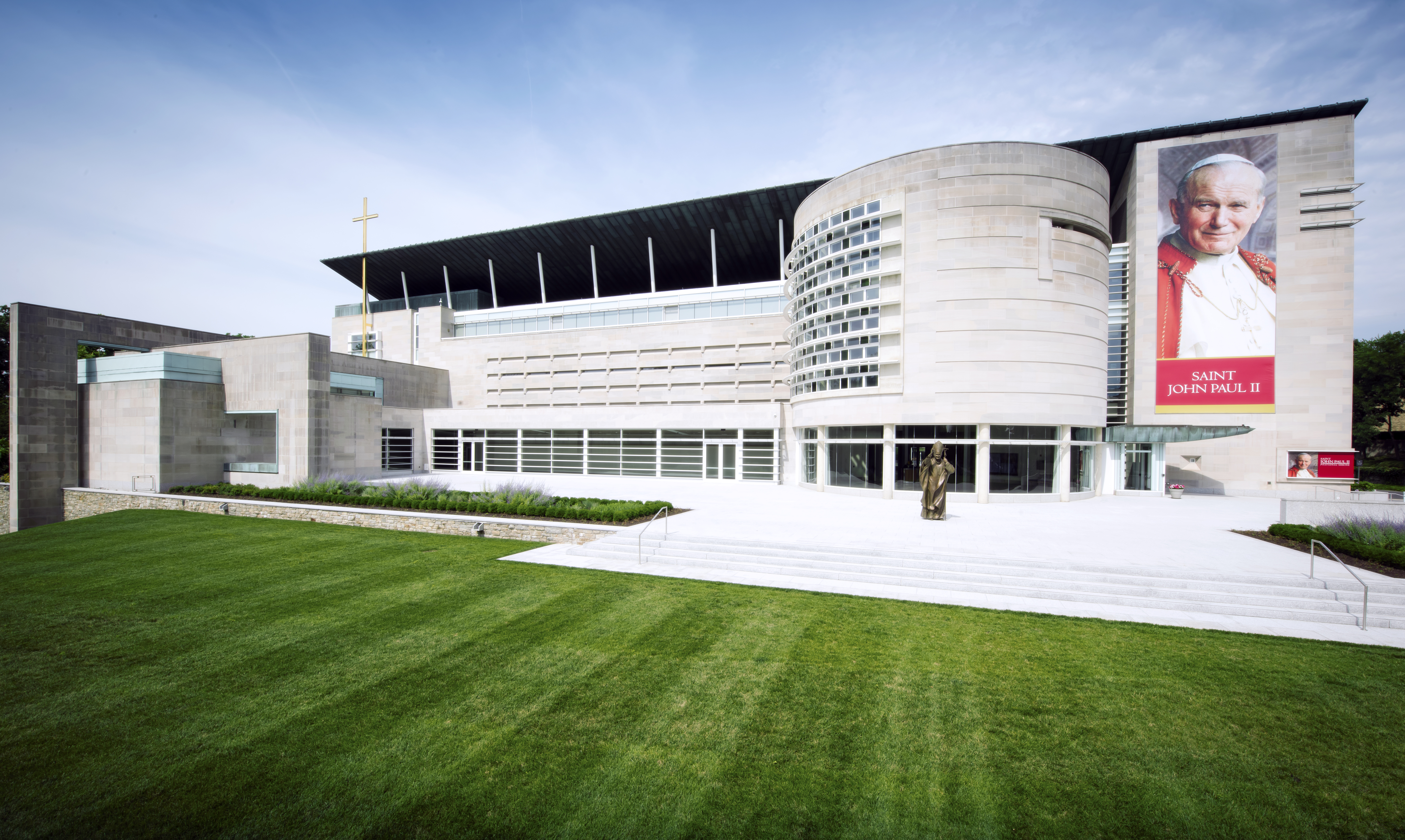
Saint John Paul II National Shrine, Washington, D.C. (2017)

Hurley was ordained to the priesthood of the Archdiocese of Detroit at the Cathedral of the Most Blessed Sacrament in Detroit by Archbishop John Dearden on June 5, 1965. After his ordination, the archdiocese assigned Hurley to the following parish appointments:

- Pastoral vicar at St. Dorothy in Warren (1965–1969)
- Vicar for the Warren-Centerline Vicariate (1969–1972)
- Pastor of St. Cyprian in Riverview (1972–1976)
- Pastor of Sacred Heart in Roseville (1976–1979)
- Pastor of St. Lucy in St. Clair Shores (1979–1982)

Cardinal Edmund Szoka then sent Hurley to further his studies at the Catholic University of America in Washington, D.C., where he obtained a Licentiate of Canon Law in 1984. Upon returning to Detroit, Hurley served in three more appointments:

- Judicial vicar of the metropolitan tribunal (1984–1989)
- Diocesan moderator of the curia (1986–1990)
- Pastor of Our Lady of Sorrows Parish in Farmington, Michigan (1990–2003)

In 1994, Pope John Paul II named Hurley an honorary prelate, giving him the title of monsignor. That year, he also became a member of the Equestrian Order of the Holy Sepulchre of Jerusalem.

Hurley served as Cardinal Adam Maida's delegate for clergy misconduct from 1988 to 1995 and again from 2002 to 2005. Hurley also served as Maida's delegate and project manager for the construction of the Saint John Paul II National Shrine in Washington, D.C., from 1995 to 2001.

=== Auxiliary Bishop of Detroit ===
On July 7, 2003, Pope John Paul II appointed Hurley as the 22nd auxiliary bishop of Detroit and titular bishop of Chunavia. Maida performed Hurley's episcopal consecration at the Cathedral of the Most Blessed Sacrament on August 12, 2003, with Szoka and Bishop Walter Schoenherr serving as co-consecrators. At that time, Hurley selected "Serve With Gladness" (from Psalm 100:2) as his episcopal motto. As an auxiliary bishop, he was responsible for the Northwest Region of the archdiocese, which encompasses Oakland and Lapeer Counties.

=== Bishop of Grand Rapids ===
On June 21, 2005, Pope Benedict XVI named Hurley as the 11th bishop of Grand Rapids. He was installed on August 4, 2005.

=== Resignation ===
As required, Hurley submitted his resignation to Pope Benedict XVI on his 75th birthday, May 30, 2012. However, Pope Francis only accepted the resignation on April 18, 2013, when he appointed Reverend David Walkowiak as the new bishop of Grand Rapids. During the period between his resignation and Walkowiak's installation, Hurley served as apostolic administrator of the diocese.

=== Apostolic administrator and moderator ===
On October 17, 2018, following the sudden death of Bishop Joseph Cistone on October 16, Pope Francis named Hurley as the apostolic administrator of the Diocese of Saginaw. In February 2019, Hurley removed Reverend Edwin Dwyer as parochial administrator of Our Lady of Peace Parish in Bay City, Michigan, and as chaplain at Saginaw Valley State University in University Center, Michigan. Hurley said that Dwyer can caused controversy in the parish by introducing traditional worship elements in the masses such as incense and bells, a black cassock for the priest, white surplices for the altar servers, and Latin and Gregorian chants Hurley served in Saginaw until July 2019.

On June 23, 2020, Francis chose Hurley as the apostolic administrator of the Diocese of Gaylord. Hurley held this position until the consecration of Reverend Jeffrey Walsh as bishop on March 4, 2022.

In October 2023, the Archdiocese of Detroit named Hurley as moderator of the Waters of Light Family of Parishes in the archdiocese.

== See also ==
- Catholic Church hierarchy
- Catholic Church in the United States
- Historical list of the Catholic bishops of the United States
- List of Catholic bishops of the United States
- Lists of patriarchs, archbishops, and bishops

== Episcopal succession ==
Catholic Church titles
Preceded by Kevin Michael Britt	Bishop of Grand Rapids; 2005–2013	Succeeded by David John Walkowiak
Preceded by -	Auxiliary Bishop of Detroit; 2003–2005	Succeeded by -
