= Basilica of St. Adalbert (Grand Rapids, Michigan) =

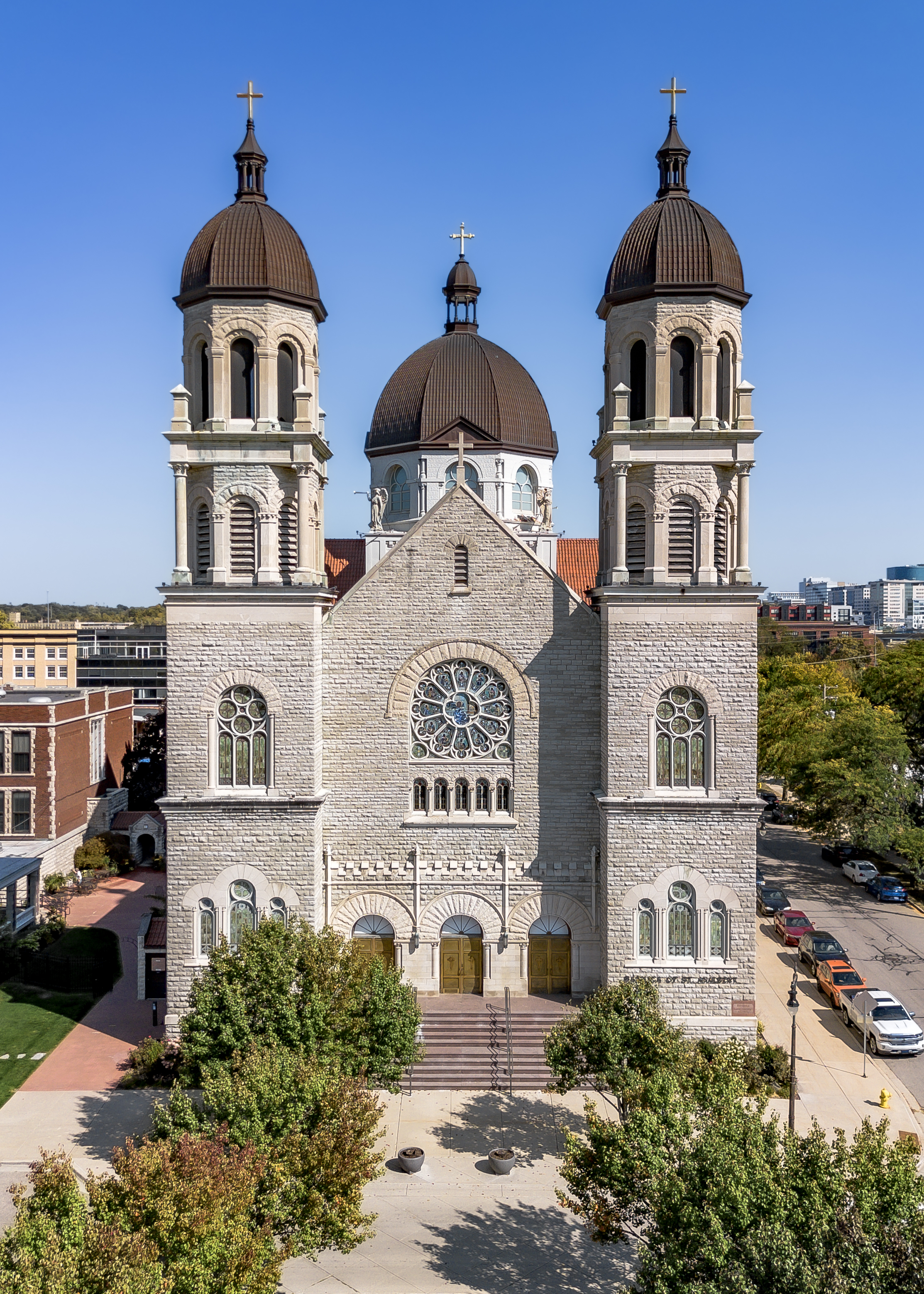
- Front view of the basilica
- Location of the Basilica of St. Adalbert
- 42°58′31″N 85°41′05″W
- Location: 654 Davis Avenue, NW; Grand Rapids, Michigan
- Country: United States
- Denomination: Roman Catholic Church
- Website: basilicagr.org

History
- Status: Minor basilica
- Founded: 1881

Architecture
- Architect: Henry J. Harks
- Style: Romanesque Revival
- Groundbreaking: 1907
- Completed: 1913
- Construction cost: $150,000

Specifications
- Length: 194 feet (59 m)
- Width: 94 feet (29 m) (transept)
- Height: 150 feet (46 m)
- Materials: Limestone

Administration
- Diocese: Grand Rapids

Clergy
- Bishop: Most Rev. David J. Walkowiak
- Pastor: Fr. Kyle Kilpatrick

The Basilica of St. Adalbert is a minor basilica of the Catholic Church and a parish church of the Catholic Diocese of Grand Rapids in Grand Rapids, Michigan, United States. Its namesake and patron is St. Adalbert of Prague (c. 956 – 23 April 997), bishop and martyr, and a Patron of Poland, the nation from which the basilica's original parishioners emigrated.

== History ==
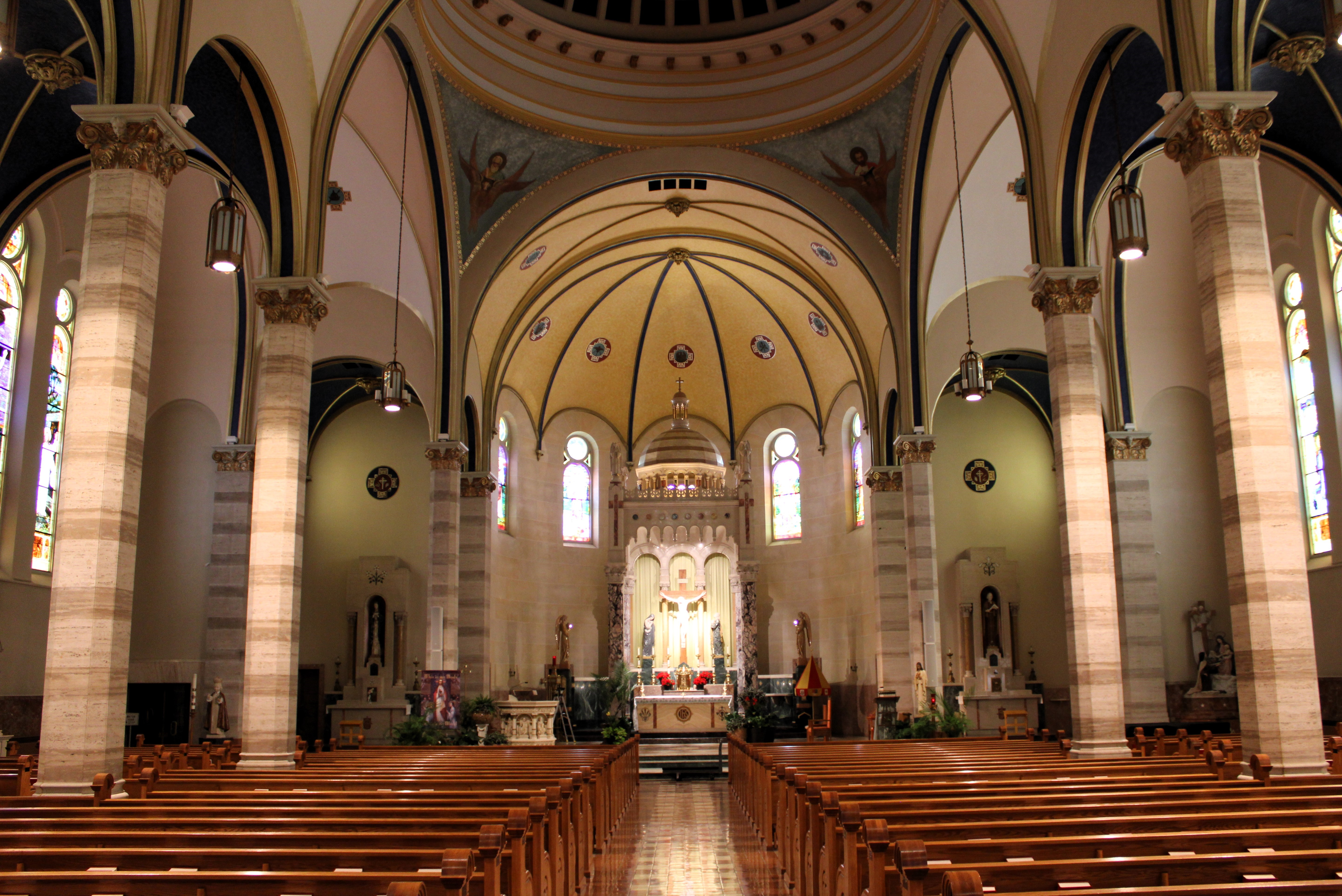
Interior facing the altar.

The Basilica of St. Adalbert traces its beginning to the founding of the Saint Adalbert Aid Society in Grand Rapids, Michigan, in 1872. The purpose of the society was to assist new Polish immigrants to Grand Rapids in finding housing and employment. It purchased two lots at the corner of Fourth Street and Davis Avenue, NW in 1880, and in June 1881 began construction of a small wooden church. Ten years later the frame structure was enlarged. In 1892 the society built a large meeting hall for itself, which is still in use.

Work began on the present church in July 1907. The cornerstone was laid on 18 August 1907, and construction continued late into the spring of 1913. It was built by the Andrews Brothers Company of Cleveland, Ohio. The cost for the building and its furnishings was approximately $150,000. The original wooden church was moved to Belmont, Michigan where it became Assumption of the Blessed Virgin Mary Church. This church continued to use the frame building until the late 1980s when it erected a new church.

Pope John Paul II elevated St. Adalbert Church to the status of a minor basilica on 22 August 1979. The dedication liturgy was celebrated in conjunction with the centennial of the parish on 16 February 1980.

The parish has subsequently been merged with St. James Parish, also in Grand Rapids.

== Architecture ==
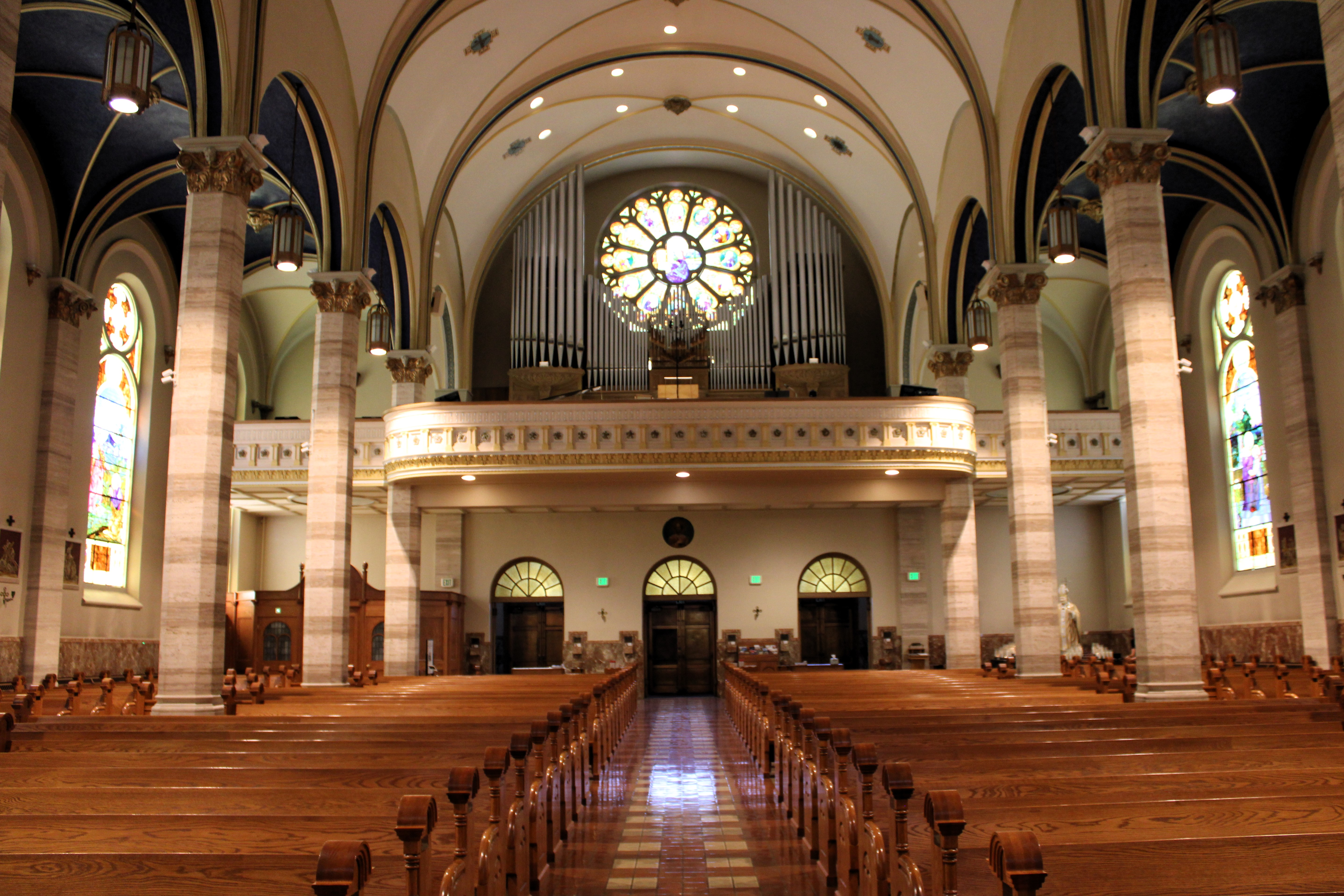
Rear gallery and pipe organ

The Romanesque Revival edifice was designed by architect Henry J. Harks of Cleveland, Ohio. Architect Chris Vierheilig of Grand Rapids supervised its construction. The exterior walls of the basilica are covered in limestone from Sandusky, Ohio and it is trimmed in Bedford limestone. The two towers that flank the façade are 134 feet (41 m) high and the large central dome rises to 150 feet (46 m) above the ground, making it one of the tallest buildings in Grand Rapids. The dome reflects Byzantine influence while the facade's large rose window reveals Gothic influence. The basilica's stained glass windows were designed by A. Artmaier and created by craftsmen from Munich, Germany. Edmund Verlinden designed the altars, pulpit, baptismal font, and confessionals. The original communion rail was topped with Georgia marble. The pews were crafted by the American Seating Company of Grand Rapids, a nod to the city's large furniture industry.

== See also ==
- List of churches in the Roman Catholic Diocese of Grand Rapids
- List of Catholic basilicas
