= Kevin Michael Britt =

American prelate (1944-2004)

His Excellency, The Most Reverend Kevin Michael Britt
- Bishop of Grand Rapids
- See: Diocese of Grand Rapids
- In office: October 13, 2003; May 16, 2004
- Predecessor: Robert John Rose
- Successor: Walter Allison Hurley
- Previous posts: Auxiliary Bishop of Detroit (1993–2002)

Orders
- Ordination: June 28, 1970 by John Francis Dearden
- Consecration: January 6, 1994 by Adam Joseph Maida

Personal details
- Born: November 19, 1944 Detroit, Michigan, US
- Died: May 15, 2004 (aged 59) Grand Rapids, Michigan, US
- Education: University of Detroit; St. John's Provincial Seminary
- Motto: Kindness, mercy, love

Kevin Michael Britt (November 19, 1944 – May 16, 2004) was an American prelate of the Roman Catholic Church. He served as bishop of the Diocese of Grand Rapids in Michigan from 2003 to 2004. Britt previously served as an auxiliary bishop of the Archdiocese of Detroit in Michigan from 1993 to 2002

== Biography ==
=== Early life ===
Kevin Britt was born on November 19, 1944, in Detroit, Michigan. He attended Sacred Heart Seminary in Detroit, then entered the University of Detroit. After earning a Master in Religious Studies degree there, he went to St. John's Provincial Seminary in Plymouth, Michigan, earning a Master of Divinity degree.

Britt was ordained to the priesthood at St. Agatha Church in Redford Township, Michigan, by Cardinal John Dearden on June 28, 1970, for the Archdiocese of Detroit. While a priest, Britt served as secretary to Cardinal Edmund Szoka at the Vatican and was a member of the Staff of the Economic Affairs of the Holy See.

=== Auxiliary Bishop of Detroit ===
On November 23, 1993, Pope John Paul II appointed Britt as an auxiliary bishop of Detroit; he was consecrated at the Cathedral of the Most Blessed Sacrament in Detroit, Michigan, by Cardinal Adam Maida on January 6, 1994.

=== Coadjutor Bishop and Bishop of Grand Rapids ===
On December 10, 2002, John Paul II appointed Britt as coadjutor bishop of Grand Rapids. On October 13, 2003, he became bishop of the diocese.Kevin Britt died in his sleep at age 59 on May 16, 2004, at his home in Grand Rapids after only seven months as bishop.
