= Inn at St. John's Plymouth Detroit =

Hotel and resort in the United States

Saint John's Resort
- Interactive map of the Saint John's Resort area

General information
- Location: United States, 44045 Five Mile Road; Plymouth - Detroit, Michigan 48170
- Coordinates: 42.3947°N 83.4765°W

Other information
- Number of rooms: 118

The Inn at St. John's is now legally named Saint John's Resort a luxury boutique hotel and golf resort located in the Metro Detroit city of Plymouth, Michigan. The hotel contains the "Five Steakhouse" restaurant. In addition, Saint John's has 54,000+ sq ft of meeting space for corporate meetings, galas, and large events. The hotel architecture is in the Romanesque Revival style. The resort contains an 18-hole championship golf course opening in Spring 2024 gardens, recreation facilities, and an indoor swimming pool.

== History ==
The inn, opened in 2006, is privately owned, created by a private investor within larger site of the landmarked former St. John's Provincial Seminary, owned by the Archdiocese of Detroit. Special events, such as the Concours d'Elegance of America car classic, are held at the resort.
