= East Vandergrift, Pennsylvania =

Borough in Pennsylvania, US

- Borough
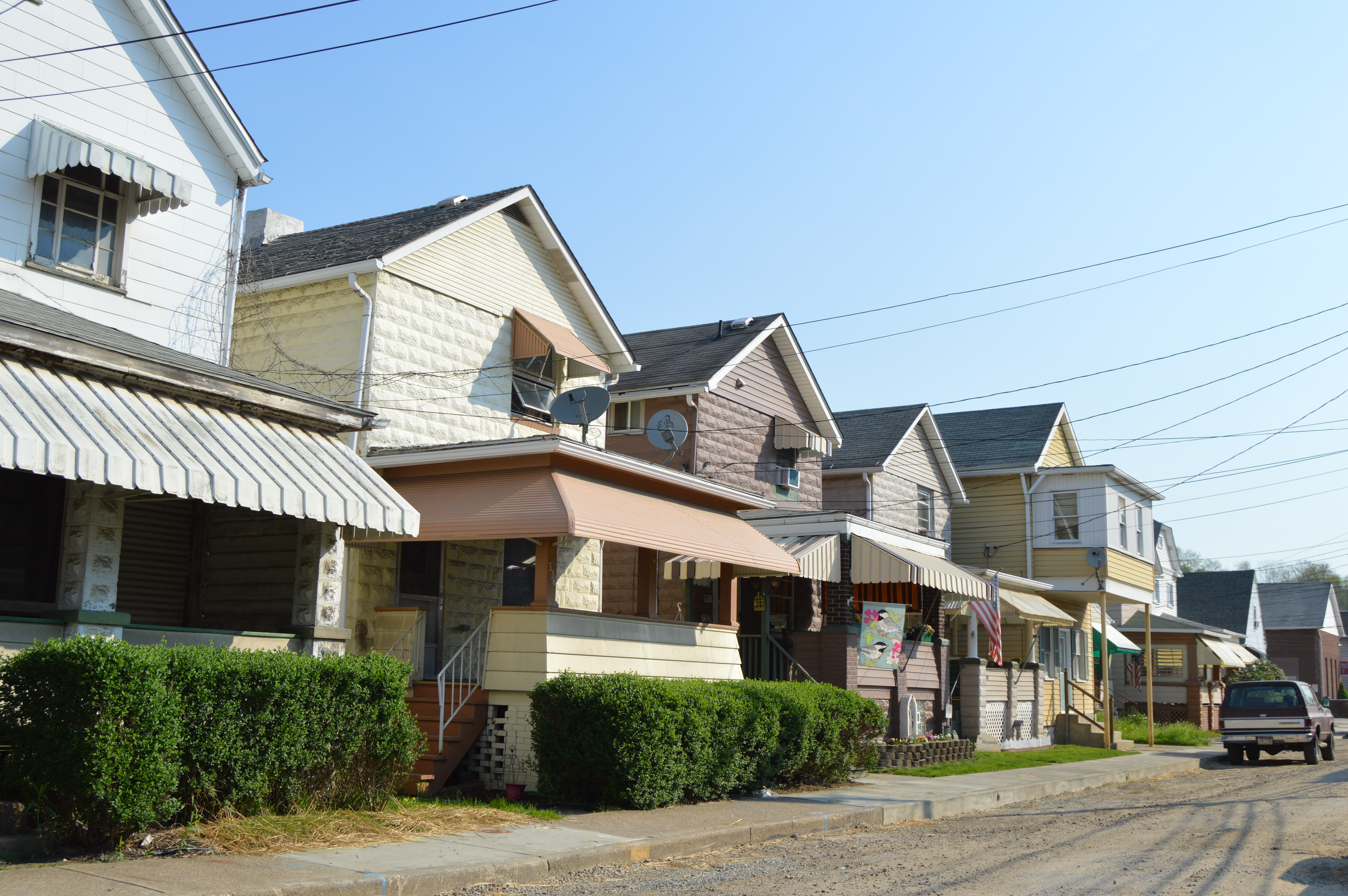
- Houses on McKinley Avenue

- Location of East Vandergrift in Westmoreland County, Pennsylvania.

- Location within Pennsylvania
- Coordinates: 40°35′54″N 79°33′43″W
- Country: United States
- State: Pennsylvania
- County: Westmoreland
- Incorporated: December 18, 1901

Government
  - Type: Borough council
  - Mayor: Barbara Sharp

Area
  - Total: 0.15 sq mi (0.38 km^{2})
  - Land: 0.13 sq mi (0.33 km^{2})
  - Water: 0.019 sq mi (0.05 km^{2})
- Elevation: 814 ft (248 m)

Population (2020)
  - Total: 602
  - Density: 4,771.9/sq mi (1,842.46/km^{2})
- Time zone: UTC-5 (Eastern (EST))
  - Summer (DST): UTC-4 (EDT)
- Zip code: 15629
- FIPS code: 42-21976
- Website: Official borough website

East Vandergrift is a borough in Westmoreland County in the U.S. state of Pennsylvania. The population was 601 at the 2020 census.

== Geography ==
According to the United States Census Bureau, the borough has a total area of 0.1 square miles (0.26 km^{2}), of which 0.1 square miles (0.26 km^{2}) is land and 0.04 square miles (0.10 km^{2}) (14.29%) is water.

== Demographics ==
Historical population
Census	Pop.	Note	%±
1910	1,852		—
1920	1,989		7.4%
1930	2,441		22.7%
1940	2,005		−17.9%
1950	1,665		−17.0%
1960	1,388		−16.6%
1970	1,151		−17.1%
1980	955		−17.0%
1990	787		−17.6%
2000	742		−5.7%
2010	674		−9.2%
2020	602		−10.7%
2021 (est.)	596	▼	−1.0%

As of the census of 2000, there were 742 people, 333 households, and 204 families living in the borough. The population density was 6,091.4 inhabitants per square mile (2,351.9/km^{2}). There were 375 housing units at an average density of 3,078.6 per square mile (1,188.7/km^{2}). The racial makeup of the borough was 99.60% White, 0.13% African American, 0.13% Native American, and 0.13% from two or more races.

There were 333 households, out of which 30.3% had children under the age of 18 living with them, 42.3% were married couples living together, 13.5% had a female householder with no husband present, and 38.7% were non-families. 35.7% of all households were made up of individuals, and 21.3% had someone living alone who was 65 years of age or older. The average household size was 2.23 and the average family size was 2.88.

In the borough the population was spread out, with 23.6% under the age of 18, 6.2% from 18 to 24, 29.0% from 25 to 44, 19.1% from 45 to 64, and 22.1% who were 65 years of age or older. The median age was 39 years. For every 100 females there were 86.0 males. For every 100 females age 18 and over, there were 84.7 males.

The median income for a household in the borough was $25,817, and the median income for a family was $30,000. Males had a median income of $27,361 versus $22,500 for females. The per capita income for the borough was $14,611. About 14.4% of families and 16.0% of the population were below the poverty line, including 24.4% of those under age 18 and 14.6% of those age 65 or over.

== Notable person ==
- Adam Cardinal Maida, former archbishop of Detroit
