= Henry Richter (bishop) =

Catholic bishop (1838–1916)

His Excellency, The Right Reverend Henry Joseph Richter
- Bishop of Grand Rapids
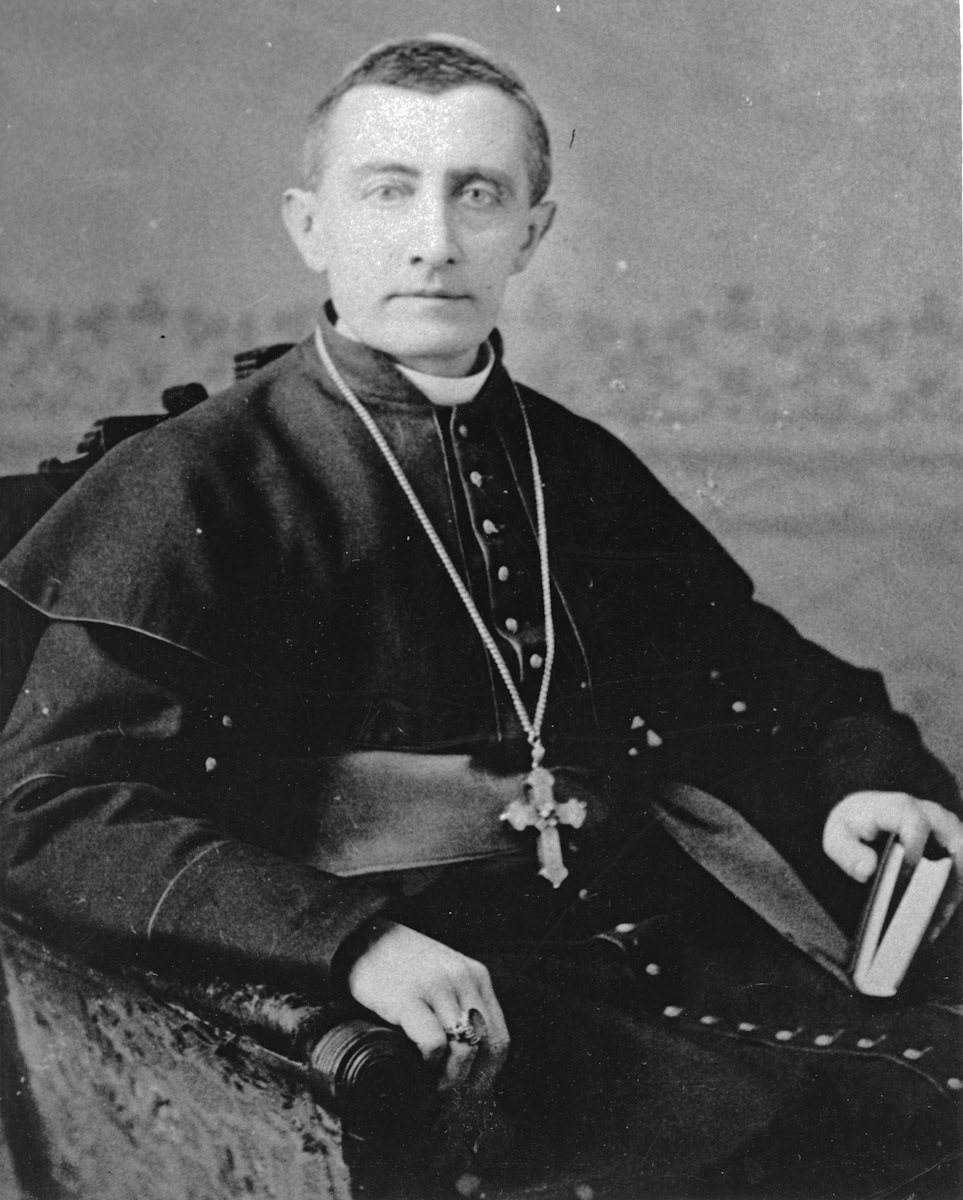
- Church: Roman Catholic
- See: Diocese of Grand Rapids
- In office: April 22, 1883; December 26, 1916
- Successor: Michael Gallagher

Orders
- Ordination: June 10, 1865 by Costantino Patrizi Naro
- Consecration: April 22, 1883 by William Henry Elder

Personal details
- Born: April 9, 1838} Neuenkirchen-Vörden, Grand Duchy of Oldenburg (now Germany)
- Died: December 26, 1916 (aged 78) Grand Rapids, Michigan, USA
- Education: St. Joseph's College; Pontifical North American College

Henry Joseph Richter (April 9, 1838 – December 26, 1916) was a German-born prelate of the Roman Catholic Church. He served as the first bishop of the new Diocese of Grand Rapids in Michigan from 1883 until his death in 1916.

== Biography ==
=== Early life ===
Henry Richter was born on April 9, 1838, in Neuenkirchen in the Grand Duchy of Oldenburg (now Germany) to Johann and Anna (née Albers) Richter. After studying at local schools and under a private teacher, Henry Richter immigrated to the United States in 1854, settling in Cincinnati, Ohio. He then enrolled at St. Xavier's College in Cincinnati. Richter then studied at St. Joseph's College in Bardstown, Kentucky, before returning to Cincinnati to attend Mount St. Mary's Seminary. In 1860, he was sent to the Pontifical North American College in Rome, obtaining a Doctor of Sacred Theology degree in 1865.

=== Priesthood ===
While in Rome, Richter was ordained to the priesthood for the Archdiocese of Cincinnati by Cardinal Costantino Patrizi Naro on June 10, 1865. Upon his return to Cincinnati in October 1865, Richter was named professor of dogmatic theology, philosophy, and liturgy at Mount St. Mary's Seminary. He also served as chaplain to the Sisters of Charity at Cedar Grove, and became vice-president of Mount St. Mary's in 1866. In 1870, he was appointed as the founding pastor of St. Lawrence Parish in the Price Hill neighborhood of Cincinnati.

=== Bishop of Grand Rapids ===
On January 30, 1883, Richter was appointed the first bishop of the newly erected Diocese of Grand Rapids by Pope Leo XIII. He received his episcopal consecration on April 22, 1883, from Archbishop William Elder, with Bishops Caspar Borgess and William McCloskey serving as co-consecrators, at St. Andrew's Cathedral in Grand Rapids, Michigan.

When Richter was appointed bishop, the diocese had 36 priests, 33 churches, 17 parochial schools, and 50,000 Catholics; by the time of his death, there were 75 priests, 56 churches, 38 parochial schools, and over 150,000 Catholics. He also attended the Second (1882) and Fifth (1889) Provincial Councils of Cincinnati and the Third Plenary Council of Baltimore (1884).

=== Death and legacy ===
Henry Richter died on December 26, 1916, after three days of illness at St. Mary's Hospital in Grand Rapids; he was age 78.

Catholic Church titles
Preceded by none	Bishop of Grand Rapids; 1883–1916	Succeeded by Michael Gallagher
