= Adam Maida =

American Catholic prelate (born 1930)

His Eminence Adam Joseph Maida
- Cardinal, Archbishop Emeritus of Detroit
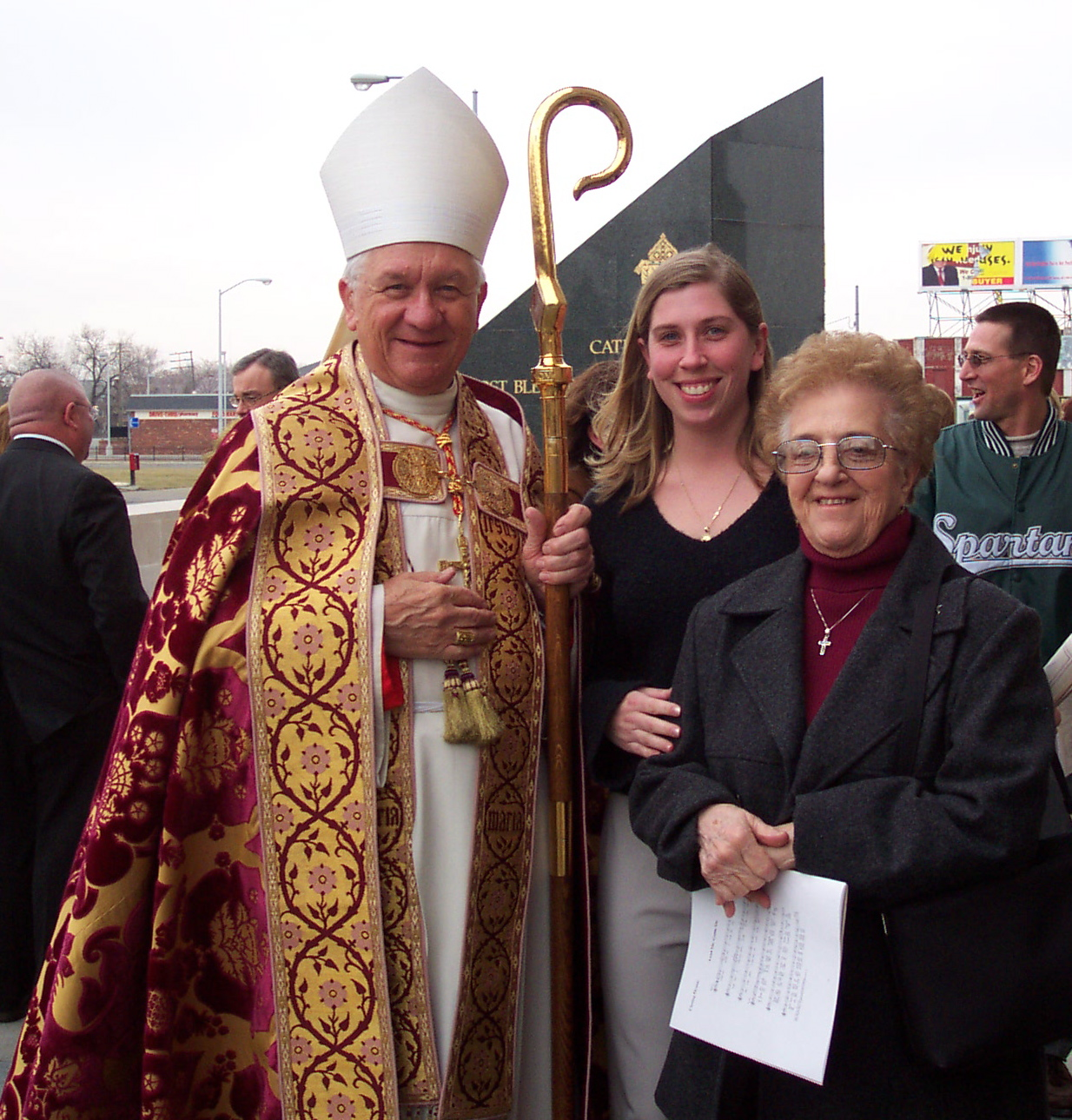
- Cardinal Maida in 2004
- Church: Catholic
- Archdiocese: Detroit
- Appointed: April 28, 1990
- Installed: June 12, 1990
- Retired: January 5, 2009
- Predecessor: Edmund Szoka
- Successor: Allen Henry Vigneron
- Other post: Cardinal-Priest of Santi Vitale, Valeria, Gervasio e Protasio
- Previous posts: Bishop of Green Bay (1984‍–‍1990); Superior of Cayman Islands (2000‍–‍2009)

Orders
- Ordination: May 26, 1956 by John Francis Dearden
- Consecration: January 25, 1984 by Pio Laghi, Aloysius John Wycisło, and Vincent Leonard
- Created cardinal: November 26, 1994 by John Paul II
- Rank: Cardinal-Priest

Personal details
- Born: March 18, 1930 (age 96) East Vandergrift, Pennsylvania, U.S.
- Education: BPh, Saint Vincent College (1952); STL, St. Mary's University (1956); JCL, Pontifical Lateran University (1960); JD, Duquesne University School of Law (1964)
- Motto: Facere omnia nova (Latin for 'To make all things new')
- Styles
- Reference style: His Eminence
- Spoken style: Your Eminence
- Religious style: Cardinal
- Informal style: Cardinal
- See: Detroit (Emeritus)

Ordination history
History
Episcopal consecration
- Consecrated by: Pio Laghi (Apos. Del.)
- Date: January 25, 1984
Episcopal succession
Bishops consecrated by Adam Maida as principal consecrator
- Bernard Joseph Harrington: January 6, 1994
- Kevin Michael Britt: January 6, 1994
- Carl Frederick Mengeling: January 25, 1996
- John Clayton Nienstedt: July 9, 1996
- Allen Henry Vigneron: July 9, 1996
- James Albert Murray: January 27, 1998
- Leonard Paul Blair: August 24, 1999
- Earl Alfred Boyea Jr.: September 13, 2002
- Walter Allison Hurley: August 12, 2003
- Francis Ronald Reiss: August 12, 2003
- John Michael Quinn: August 12, 2003
- Alexander King Sample: January 25, 2006
- Daniel E. Flores: November 29, 2006

Adam Joseph Maida (born March 18, 1930) is an American Catholic prelate who served as archbishop of Detroit in Michigan from 1990 to 2009, and was elevated to the cardinalate in 1994. He previously served as bishop of Green Bay in Wisconsin from 1984 to 1990.

== Biography ==
=== Early life and education ===
Maida was born on March 18, 1930, in East Vandergrift, Pennsylvania, to Adam and Sophie (née Cieslak) Maida. The oldest of three children, he has two brothers, Thaddeus (who also became a priest) and Daniel. His father immigrated from Poland at age 16, while his mother was the daughter of Polish immigrants. He and his brothers attended public schools in East Vandergrift since there were no local Catholic schools. Maida attended Vandergrift High School and Scott Township High School, each for one year.

During his second year of high school, Maida decided to enter the priesthood. He entered St. Mary's Preparatory School in Orchard Lake Village, Michigan, graduating from there in 1948. He then entered St. Mary's College, also in Orchard Lake Village. In 1950, Maida transferred to Saint Vincent College in Latrobe, Pennsylvania, where he earned a Bachelor of Philosophy degree in 1952. He received a Licentiate of Sacred Theology from St. Mary's University in Baltimore, Maryland, in 1956.

=== Ordination and ministry ===
On May 26, 1956, Maida was ordained a priest for the Catholic Diocese of Pittsburgh by then Bishop John Dearden at the Cathedral of St. Paul in Pittsburgh. After his ordination, Maida's first assignment was as assistant pastor of St. Elizabeth of Hungary Parish in Pleasant Hills, Pennsylvania. He later served at Holy Innocents Parish in Sheraden, Pennsylvania.

In 1958, Bishop Dearden sent Maida to Rome to study at the Pontifical Lateran University, where he earned a Licentiate of Canon Law in 1960. He received his Juris Doctor from Duquesne University School of Law in Pittsburgh in 1964; he was admitted to practice law for the Commonwealth of Pennsylvania, the Federal Bar in Western Pennsylvania, and the U.S. Supreme Court.

Maida served as vice-chancellor and general counsel (1965–1983) of the diocese. In 1968, he was elected president of the Canon Law Society of America. He served on a papal commission to draft a due process procedure giving the laity legal recourse within the church, and participated in the revision of the Code of Canon Law; for the National Conference of Catholic Bishops, he worked on the adoption of a due process procedure and chaired the bishops' Canonical Affairs Committee.

Maida served as a member of the diocesan tribunal, assistant professor of theology at La Roche College in McCandless, Pennsylvania, and adjunct professor of law at Duquesne University Law School (1971–1983). He was also chaplain of the St. Thomas More Society.

=== Bishop of Green Bay ===
On November 8, 1983, Pope John Paul II appointed Maida as the ninth bishop of Green Bay. He received his episcopal consecration on January 25, 1984, from Archbishop Pio Laghi, with Bishops Aloysius Wycisło and Vincent Leonard serving as co-consecrators, at the Cathedral of St. Francis Xavier in Green Bay.

During his tenure in Green Bay, Maida appointed the diocese's first female chancellor and first female parish director. He also established a diocesan planning council and ministry formation program, initiated a diocesan census, implemented the RCIA process, and raised $9 million through Lumen Christi education endowment campaign.

=== Archbishop of Detroit ===
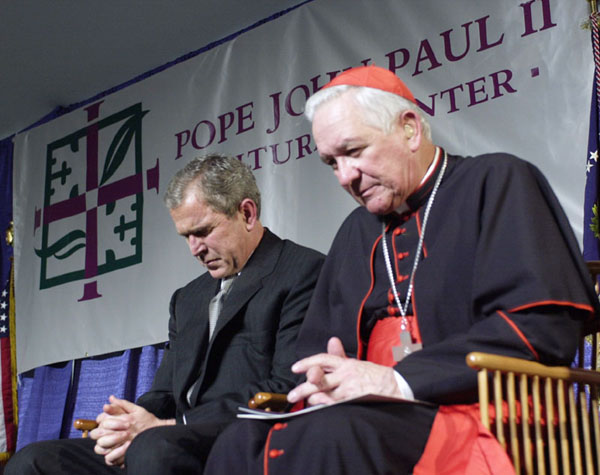
Maida with US President George W. Bush in March 2001

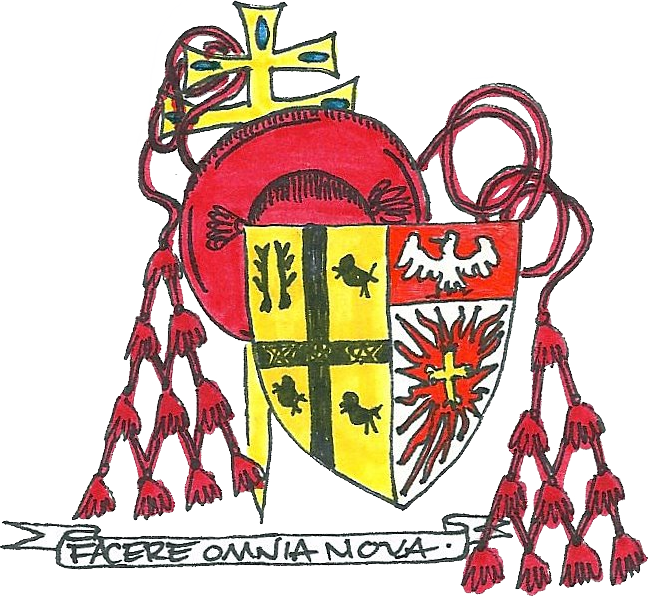
The coat of arms of Cardinal Maida, as Archbishop of Detroit

On April 28, 1990, John Paul II appointed Maida as the fourth archbishop of Detroit. He was installed on June 12, 1990. On November 26, 1994, John Paul II elevated Maida to the College of Cardinals as Cardinal-Priest of Ss. Vitale, Valeria, Gervasio e Protasio. In 2000, Maida was appointed the first superior of the Mission sui iuris of the Cayman Islands.

In April 2005, following the death of John Paul II, Maida traveled to the Vatican as a cardinal elector to participate in the conclave that selected Pope Benedict XVI. Maida is no longer eligible to vote in any future conclaves as he reached his 80th birthday. On March 18, 2005, Maida sent his letter of resignation to Pope Benedict XVI, having reached the mandatory retirement age of 75. The Vatican asked Maida to remain archbishop until further notice. On June 8, 2006, Maida celebrated the 50th anniversary of his ordination to the priesthood.

In January 2007, Maida relieved Auxiliary Bishop Emeritus Thomas Gumbleton of his pastoral duties at St. Leo Parish in Detroit. Gumbleton claimed he was being punished by Maida for his outspoken views on sexual abuse crimes by clergy. Maida claimed that he was following church rules on retirement of bishops.

=== Retirement ===
On January 5, 2009, the Vatican announced acceptance of Maida's resignation and the appointment of Bishop Allen Vigneron, from the Diocese of Oakland, as his successor. Vigneron was installed on January 28, 2009, at the Cathedral of the Most Blessed Sacrament in Detroit Maida became apostolic administrator of Detroit and assisted Vigneron with the transition.

Maida celebrated his final mass at the cathedral on January 25, 2009. This was also held in celebration of the 25th anniversary of his consecration as a bishop.

== See also ==
- Catholic Church hierarchy
- Catholic Church in the United States
- Historical list of the Catholic bishops of the United States
- List of Catholic bishops of the United States
- Lists of patriarchs, archbishops, and bishops

Catholic Church titles
| Preceded by Aloysius John Wycisło | Bishop of Green Bay; 7 November 1983 – 28 April 1990 | Succeeded by Robert Joseph Banks |
| Preceded by Edmund Szoka | Archbishop of Detroit; 28 April 1990 – 5 January 2009 | Succeeded by Allen Henry Vigneron |
| Mission sui iuris erected | Ecclesiastical Superior of the Cayman Islands; 14 July 2000 – 5 January 2009 | Succeeded by Allen Henry Vigneron |
