= St. John's Provincial Seminary =

Catholic seminary in Michigan

Coordinates: 42.3947°N 83.4765°W

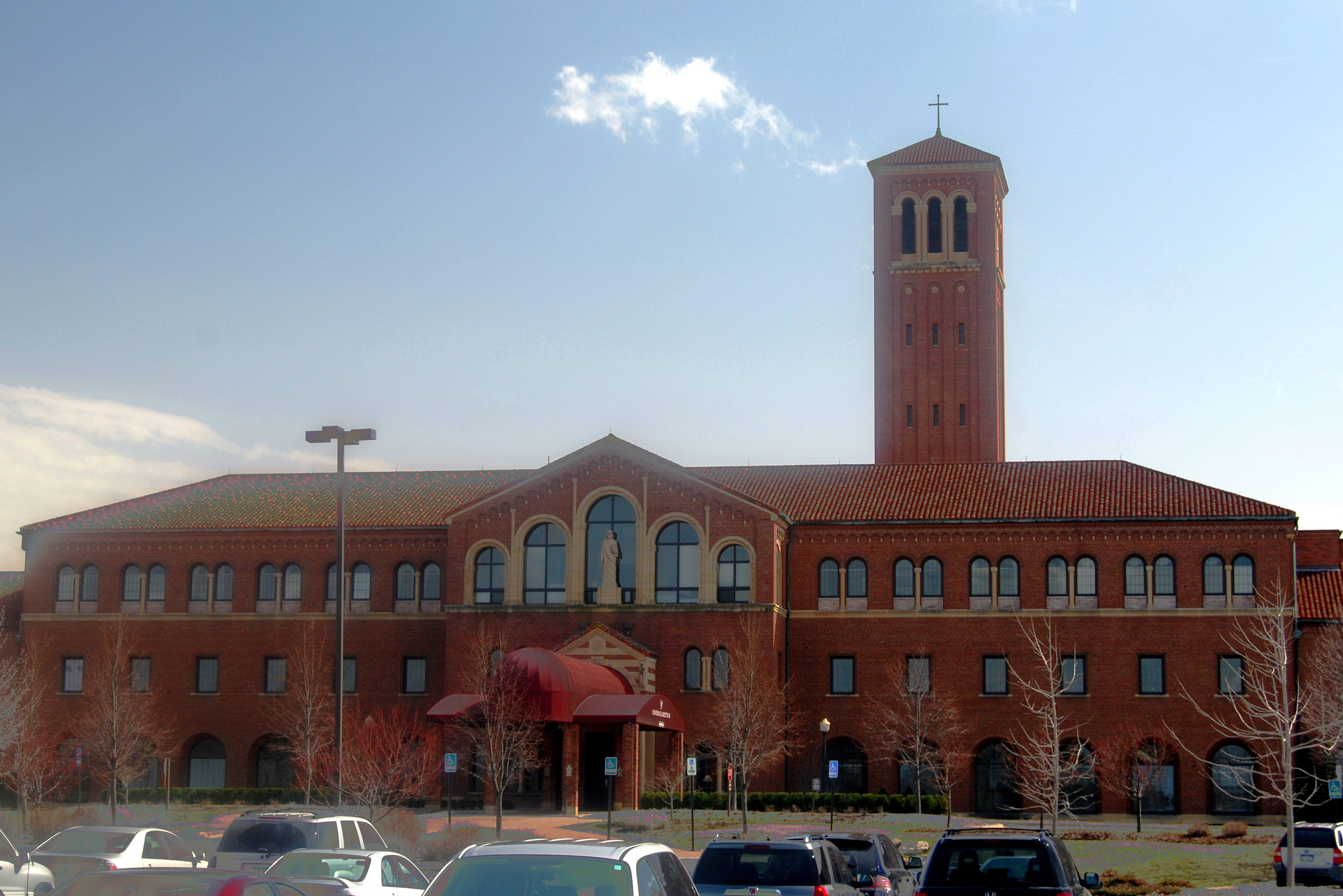
St John's Provincial Seminary

St. John's Provincial Seminary was a Catholic major seminary in the Archdiocese of Detroit that operated between 1949 and 1988 in Plymouth, Michigan.

== Catholic Seminary ==
St. John's was founded in 1949 for the province of the Archdiocese of Detroit. The Sulpicians administered and staffed the seminary until their withdrawal in 1971. The first rector was Fr. Lyman A. Fenn. Its chapel — with around fifty colored stained glass windows designed, crafted and installed by Detroit Stained Glass Works — was dedicated on May 12, 1955. In the 1980s, several priests alleged that many of the students engaged in homosexual promiscuity, including some who later were charged with the sexual abuse of minors. The seminary continued to serve the Catholic Archdiocese of Detroit until June 7, 1988, when it closed.

== Later developments ==
The property remained dormant until 1994 when Cardinal Adam Maida pushed for reviving the property as a resource for diocesan youth and families. In 1996, St. John's Center for Youth & Family was opened on the South side of the property. In 1998, the property began to be redeveloped into a comprehensive center for corporate and social conferences, Catholic weddings and celebrations. After the restoration process ended, a Grand Opening of St. John's Golf & Conference Center was celebrated in October 2000. In January 2006, a new hotel called The Inn at St. John's, opened its doors.
