= Diocese of Grand Rapids =

Latin Catholic jurisdiction in the US

Coordinates: 42°57′28.8″N 85°40′02″W

Diocese of Grand Rapids Dioecesis Grandcataractensis
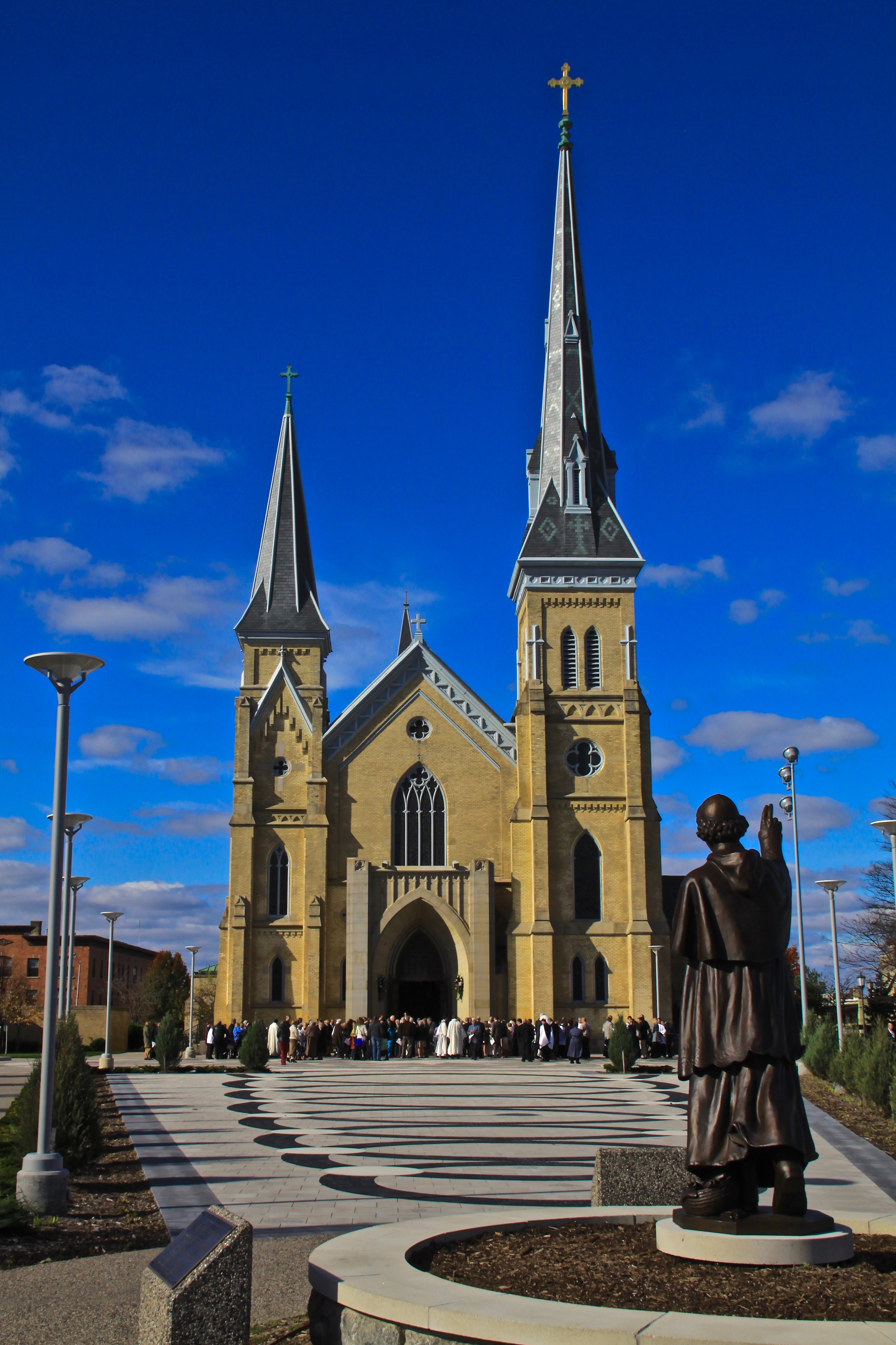
- Cathedral of St. Andrew

- Coat of arms

Location
- Country: United States
- Territory: Counties of Ottawa, Kent, Ionia, Muskegon, Newaygo, Oceana, Montcalm, Mecosta, Lake, Mason, and Osceola
- Ecclesiastical province: Detroit

Statistics
- Area: 6,795 sq mi (17,600 km^{2})
- Population: Total; Catholics: (as of 2021); 1,417,818; 193,415 (13.6%)
- Parishes: 80
- Schools: 31

Information
- Denomination: Catholic
- Sui iuris church: Latin Church
- Rite: Roman Rite
- Established: May 19, 1882 (144 years ago)
- Cathedral: Cathedral of Saint Andrew
- Patron saint: Andrew the Apostle
- Secular priests: 104

Current leadership
- Pope: Leo XIV
- Bishop: David J. Walkowiak
- Metropolitan Archbishop: Edward Weisenburger
- Vicar General: Colin J. Mulhall
- Bishops emeritus: Walter A. Hurley

Map
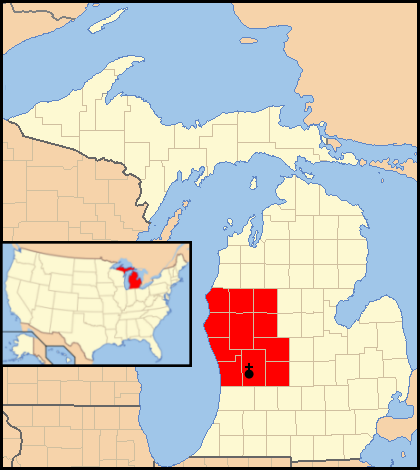

Website
- Official website

The Diocese of Grand Rapids (Latin: Dioecesis Grandcataractensis) is a diocese of the Catholic Church in western Michigan in the United States. It is a suffragan see to the Archdiocese of Detroit. The mother church of the diocese is the Cathedral of Saint Andrew in Grand Rapids. The bishop is David J. Walkowiak.

== History ==
=== 1700 to 1850 ===
During the 17th century, present-day Michigan was part of the French colony of New France. The Diocese of Quebec had jurisdiction over the region. In 1763, with the end of the French and Indian War, the Michigan area became part of the British Province of Quebec, forbidden from settlement by American colonists. After the American Revolution ended in 1783, the Michigan region became part of the new United States. For Catholics, Michigan in 1808 came under the jurisdiction of the Archdiocese of Baltimore, which then comprised the entire country.

In 1808, Pope Pius VII erected the Diocese of Bardstown in Kentucky, with jurisdiction over the new Michigan Territory. In 1821, the pope erected the Diocese of Cincinnati, taking the Michigan Territory from Bardstown. Pope Gregory XVI formed the Diocese of Detroit in 1833, covering the entire Michigan Territory.

In 1833, the missionary priest Frederic Baraga established the first permanent Catholic mission to Native Americans on the Grand River. That same year, Native American workers under Baraga's direction built St. Joseph's Church on a hill overlooking Muskegon Lake. The first resident priest in the area was Andrew Viszosky. Mission stations were later established at Beaver Island, Grand Traverse, Cheboygan, Manistee, Muskegon, Grand Haven and Ionia.

=== 1850 to 1900 ===
The first Catholic school in Grand Rapids, St. Andrew's Academy, opened in 1853.

Pope Leo XIII erected the Diocese of Grand Rapids on May 19, 1882, taking its territory in central and western Michigan from the Diocese of Detroit. The pope appointed Henry Richter from the Archdiocese of Cincinnati as the first bishop of Grand Rapids. When Richter became bishop, the diocese had 36 priests, 33 churches, 17 parochial schools, and 50,000 Catholics.

In 1884, Richter convinced a local businessman to underwrite the opening of St. John's Home, the first Catholic orphanage in Grand Rapids. A contingent of Dominican Sisters from Traverse City came to Grand Rapids to staff the orphanage. Today it is called D.A. Blodgett St. John's. The Dominican Sisters of Grand Rapids moved their Novitiate Normal School from Traverse City to Grand Rapids. The school trained members of the Dominican Order to work as teachers. Today it is known as Aquinas College.

The Sisters of Mercy opened St. Mary's Hospital in Grand Rapids in 1893. Today it is Trinity Health St. Mary's.

==== 1900 to 1950 ====
In 1903, the Sisters of Mercy opened a second facility, Mercy Hospital, in Muskegon. Now it is known as Trinity Health Muskegon.

Michael Gallagher of Grand Rapids was named coadjutor bishop of the diocese by Pope Benedict XV in 1915 to assist Richter. When Richter died in 1916, the diocese had 75 priests, 56 churches and 38 parochial schools, serving over 150,000 Catholics. After Richter's death, Gallagher automatically succeeded him as bishop of Grand Rapids.

Gallagher served in Grand Rapids less than two years before being appointed bishop of Detroit by Benedict XV in 1918. The pope then appointed Auxiliary Bishop Edward D. Kelly from Detroit to replace Gallagher in Grand Rapids. Kelly died in 1926. That same year, Pope Pius XI appointed Bishop Joseph G. Pinten of the Diocese of Superior as the fourth bishop of Grand Rapids. In 1938, the Diocese of Grand Rapids lost territory when Pope Pius XII established the Diocese of Saginaw.

After Pinten retired as bishop of Grand Rapids in 1940, Pius XII named Bishop Joseph C. Plagens of the Diocese of Sault Sainte Marie-Marquette to replace Pinten that same year. Plagens died after less than three years in office. Francis J. Haas from the Archdiocese of Milwaukee was the next bishop in Grand Rapids, appointed by Pius XII in 1943.

=== 1950 to 1980 ===
Haas served the diocese as bishop for ten years until his death in 1953. In 1954, Auxiliary Bishop Allen James Babcock of Detroit was named bishop of Grand Rapids by Pius XII. Babcock died in 1969.

In 1969, Auxiliary Bishop Joseph M. Breitenbeck of Detroit was appointed the eighth bishop of Grand Rapids. In 1970, Paul VI created both the Diocese of Gaylord and the Diocese of Kalamazoo, taking territory from the Diocese of Grand Rapids. Breitenbeck played a major role in preparing the two new dioceses.

During his tenure in Grand Rapids, Breitenbeck vigorously implemented the reforms of the Second Vatican Council. He also encouraged the practice of communal confessions, and allowed divorced and remarried Catholics to receive the sacraments. Some parishes strongly resisted changing the language of the mass from Latin to English; St. Isidore's Church even took Breitenbeck and the diocese to court over the issue. St. Adalbert Church in Grand Rapids was raised to the rank of minor basilica by Pope John Paul II in 1979.

=== 1980 to 2000 ===
In the 1980s, Breitenbeck created policies and procedures for handling allegations of clerical sexual abuse; these rules remained in force until major revisions in the early 21st century. Having a sister with developmental disabilities led him to establish a ministry to help people with disabilities.

Breitenbeck also helped establish the Deposit & Loan Cooperative Investment Program, which allowed parishes to borrow money from diocesan funds at a lower interest rate. He supported the Michigan Catholic Conference's efforts to provide retirement benefits for priests and laity. He instituted regular changes and appointments of pastors and oversaw one of the renovations of the Cathedral of St. Andrew. Instead of living at the episcopal residence, Breitenbeck sold it and moved into a modest home in Grattan Township.

Breitenbeck retired as bishop of Grand Rapids in 1989. In his 19 years as bishop, Breitenbeck oversaw the establishment of seven new parishes. In 1989, John Paul II appointed Bishop Robert Rose of Gaylord as the ninth bishop of Grand Rapids. Rose created lay leadership programs, revamped the Hispanic ministry and presented forums and events focused on racism in the diocese. He established the Catholic Foundation of West Michigan in 1995 to provide educational assistance.

=== 2000 to present ===
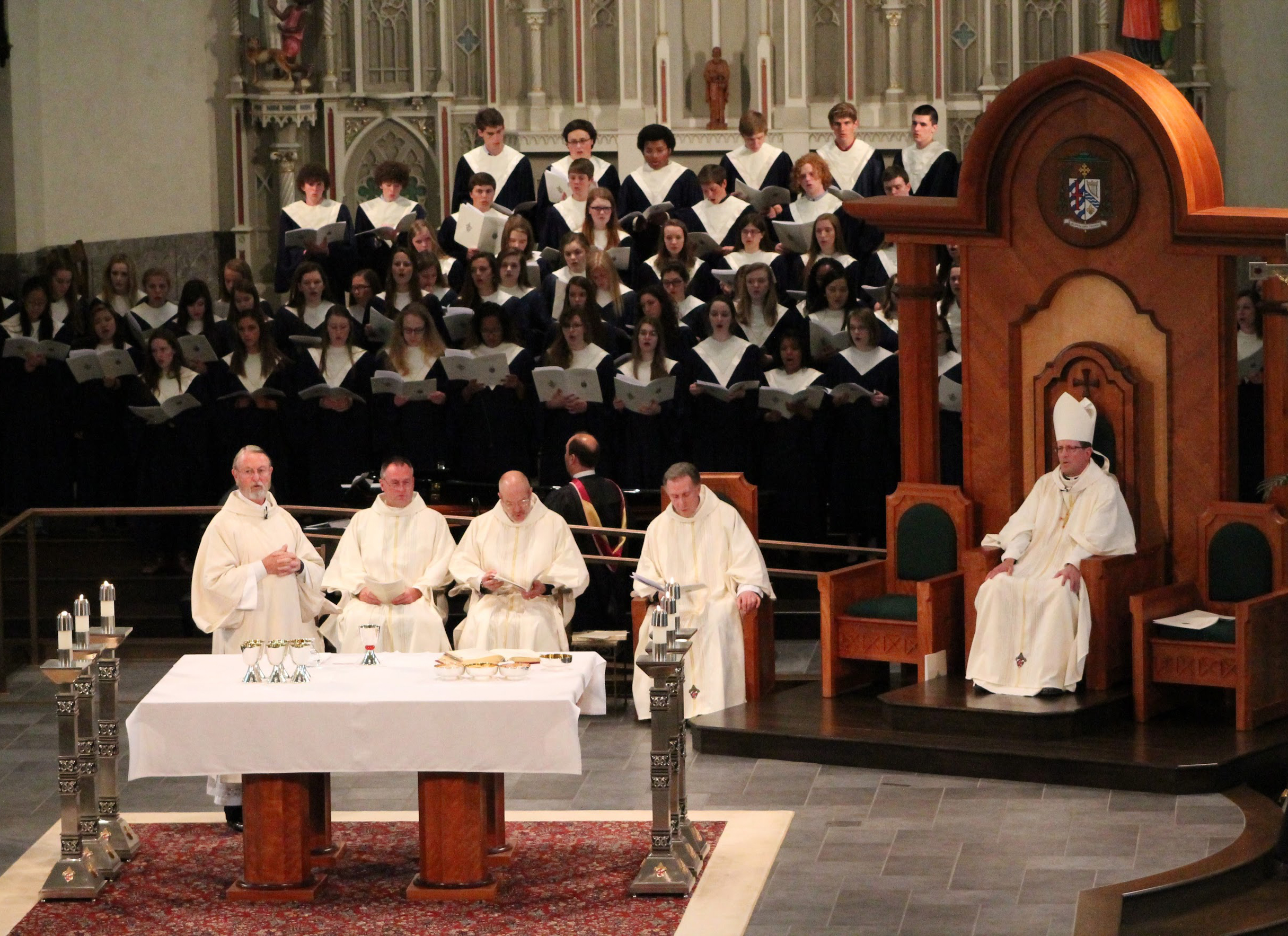
Bishop Walkowiak (sitting) (2015)

In 2002, John Paul II appointed Auxiliary Bishop Kevin Britt of Detroit as coadjutor bishop of Grand Rapids to assist Rose. After Rose retired in 2003, Britt succeeded him. Seven months later, Britt died suddenly. In 2005, Pope Benedict XVI named Auxiliary Bishop Walter A. Hurley of Detroit as the 11th bishop of Grand Rapids. Two years later, Hurley developed Cathedral Square, which linked the curia offices, Catholic Central High School and the Cathedral of Saint Andrew. He also consolidated the three social service agencies of the diocese into Catholic Charities West Michigan.

Hurley retired as bishop of Grand Rapids in 2012 and Benedict XVI appointed David Walkowiak of Detroit to replace Hurley. Walkowiak released a statement on November 27, 2019, supporting the decision of Scott Nolan, pastor of St. Stephen Parish in East Grand Rapids, to withhold the eucharist from Sara Smolenski. A town judge, Smolenski told the local media that Nolan notified her before Mass that she could not receive the eucharist because of her same-sex marriage. She also said that Nolan had given her the eurcharist the week before.

The diocese announced the “Rooted in Christ Pastoral Planning Process” in 2025 to deal with the shortage of priests. Under the plan, 13 parishes would merge to form new parishes and eight other parishes would join clusters, sharing personnel and other resources.

=== Sexual abuse ===
In 2002, the Diocese of Grand Rapids acknowledged that it had paid a $500,000 settlement in 1994 to three sisters who were sexually abused as minors by the priest John Sullivan during the late 1950s. The women did not report the crimes to the diocese until 1993. Records showed that Bishop Babcock had accepted Sullivan into the diocese, even though Sullivan had fathered a child while serving in the Diocese of Manchester. Bishop Rose said in 2002 that the diocese should have never accepted Sullivan.

In 2014, Abigail Simon, a tutor at a Catholic high school in Grand Rapids, was convicted of three counts of first-degree criminal sexual conduct and one misdemeanor count of accosting a minor for immoral purposes. Simon stated that the student sexually assaulted her. She was sentenced to eight to 25 years in prison.

In May 2021, William Langlois from Grand Haven was laicized after sexual abuse allegations against the former priest were deemed "credible." The diocese had received allegations in 2018 that Langlois, who retired in 2016, had sexually abused a minor between 1999 and 2006. The diocese immediately suspended Langlois from ministry, notified local authorities, and started an internal investigation.

The Michigan Department of Attorney General released a report in December 2025 on sexual abuse in the diocese. The report stated that 51 priests had credible allegations of sexual abuse of minors. None of the priests were still in active ministry and only 14 were still alive.

== Bishops ==
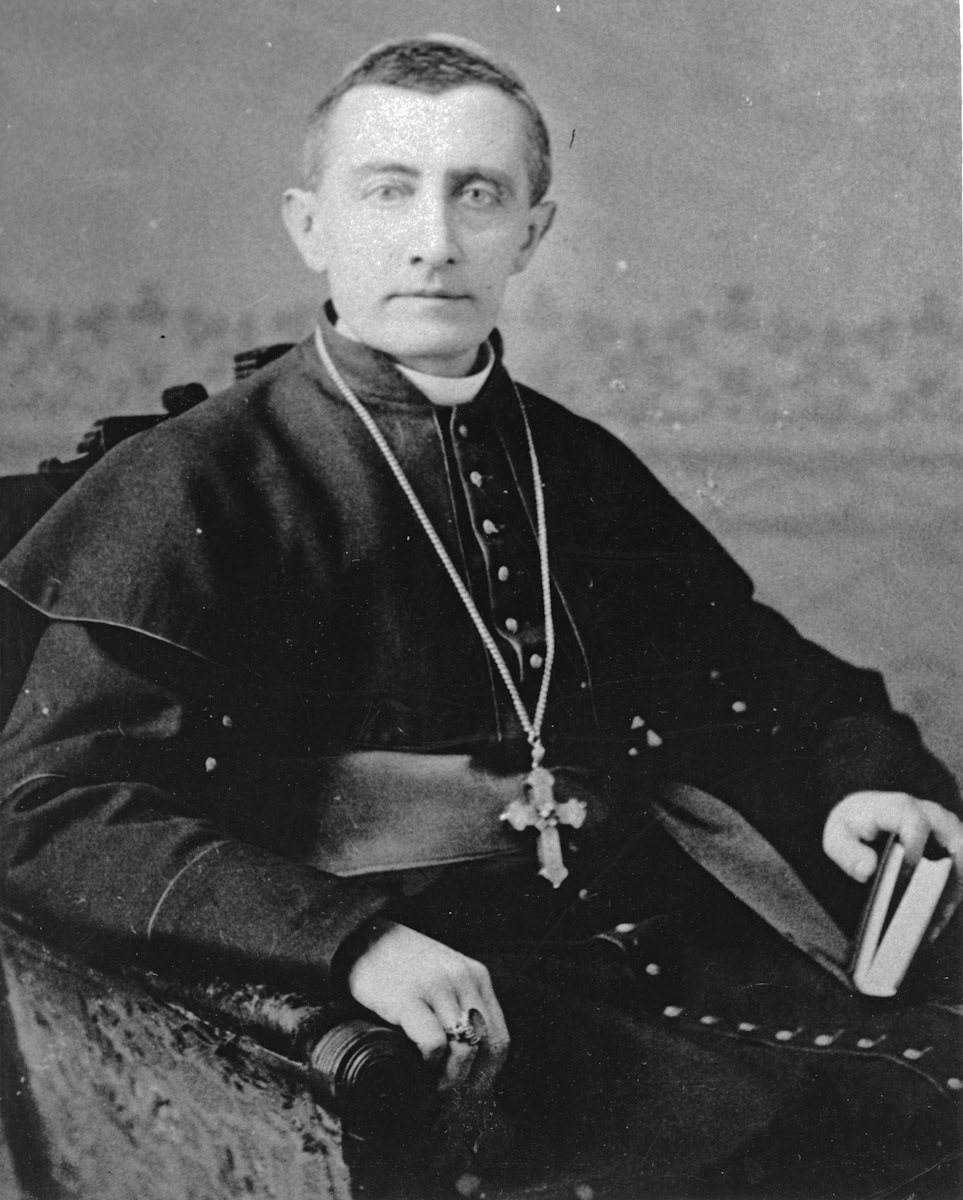
Bishop Richter (pre-1916)

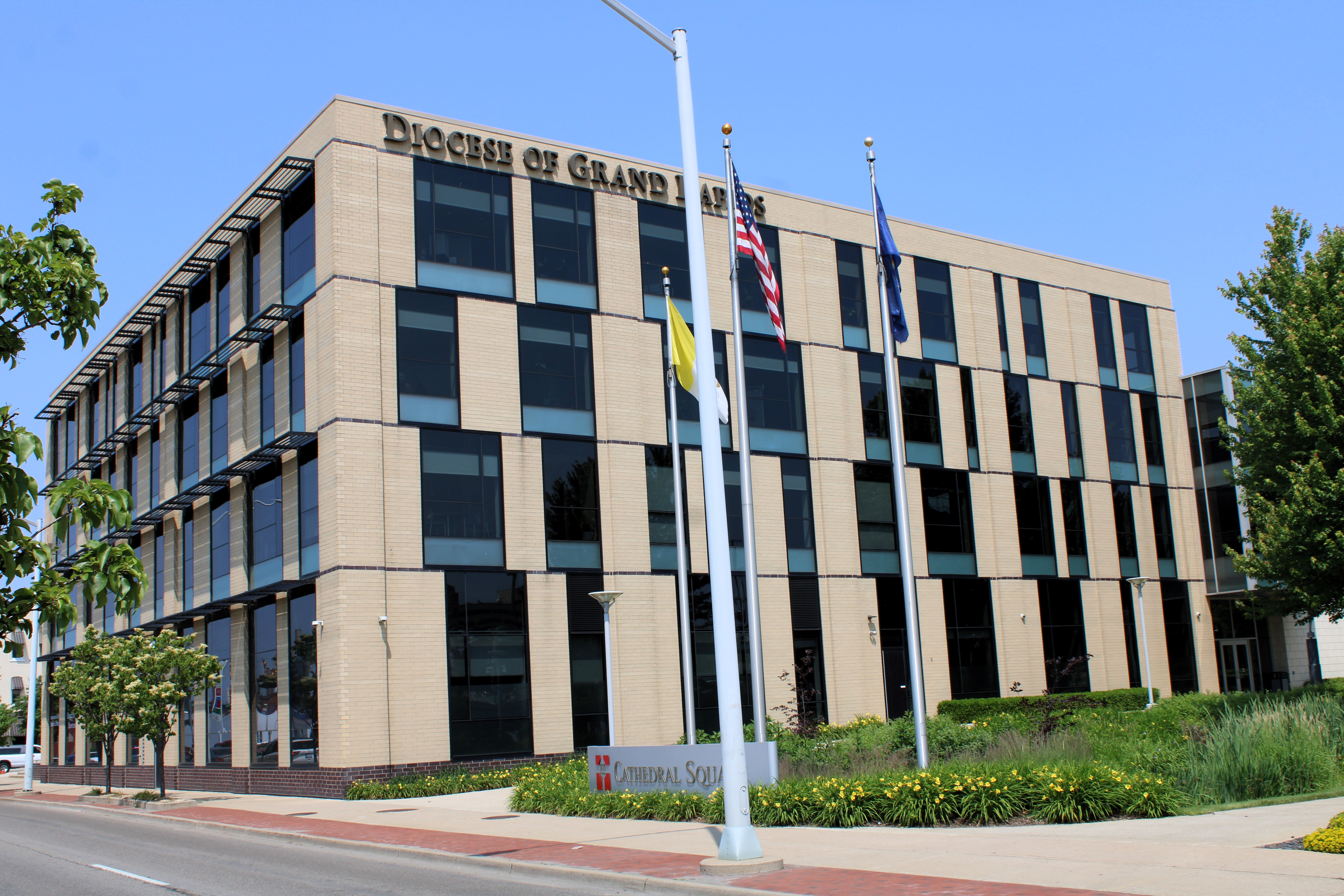
Diocesan Pastoral Center, Grand Rapids, Michigan (2023)

=== Bishops of Grand Rapids ===
1. Henry J. Richter (1883–1916)
2. Michael J. Gallagher (1916–1918, coadjutor bishop 1915–1916), appointed Bishop of Detroit
3. Edward D. Kelly (1919–1926)
4. Joseph G. Pinten (1926–1940)
5. Joseph C. Plagens (1941–1943)
6. Francis J. Haas (1943–1953)
7. Allen J. Babcock (1954–1969)
8. Joseph M. Breitenbeck (1969–1989)
9. Robert J. Rose (1989–2003)
10. Kevin M. Britt (2003–2004; coadjutor bishop 2002–2003)
11. Walter A. Hurley (2005–2013)
12. David J. Walkowiak (2013–present)

=== Auxiliary bishops ===
- Joseph Schrembs (1911), appointed Bishop of Toledo and later Bishop of Cleveland
- Charles Salatka (1962–1968), appointed Bishop of Marquette and later Archbishop of Oklahoma City
- Joseph Crescent McKinney (1968–2001)

== Education ==
As of 2026, the Diocese of Grand Rapids had five high schools and 26 elementary schools with an enrollment over 6,300 students.

=== High schools ===
- Catholic Central High School – Grand Rapids
- Muskegon Catholic Central – Muskegon
- Sacred Heart Academy – Grand Rapids
- Portland St. Patrick Catholic School – Portland
- West Catholic High School – Grand Rapids

Coat of arms of Diocese of Grand Rapids
Notes Arms was designed and adopted when the diocese was erected Adopted 1882 Escutcheon The arms contain a silver (argent) field with wavy blue (azure) bars that proceed from the upper right to the lower left (bendy sinister). Emblazoned over the background is a red (gules) Cross moline. Symbolism The wavy blue bars represent the rapids in the Grand River and Lake Michigan.
