= David John Walkowiak =

American Catholic prelate (born 1953)

His Excellency, The Most Reverend David John Walkowiak JCD
- Bishop of Grand Rapids
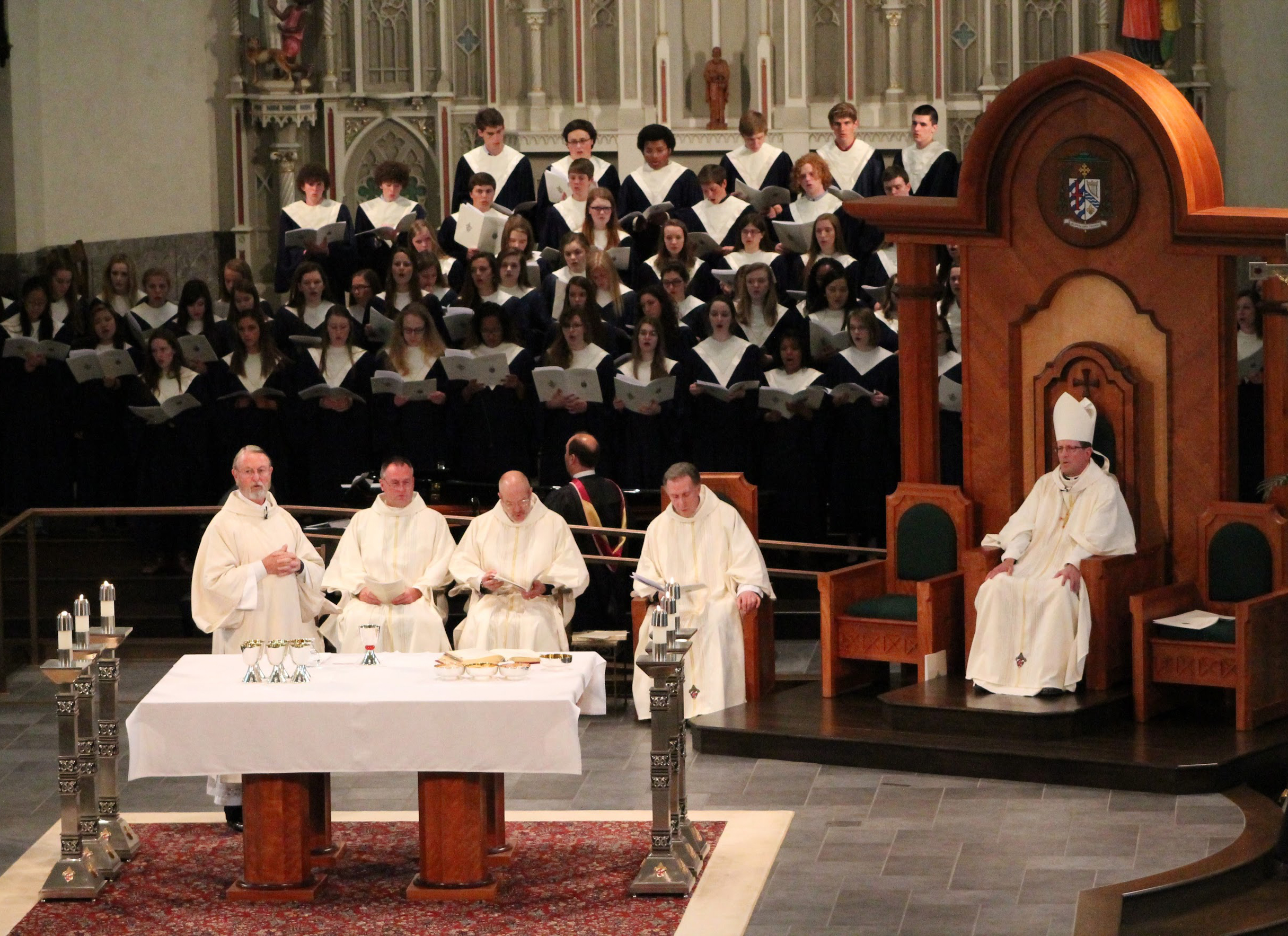
- Walkowiak in 2015, sitting on his cathedra during Mass at the Cathedral of Saint Andrew
- Province: Detroit
- Diocese: Grand Rapids
- Appointed: April 18, 2013
- Installed: June 18, 2013
- Predecessor: Walter Allison Hurley

Orders
- Ordination: June 9, 1979 by James A. Hickey
- Consecration: June 18, 2013 by Allen Henry Vigneron, Richard Lennon, and Walter A. Hurley

Personal details
- Born: June 18, 1953 (age 73) Cleveland, Ohio, US
- Denomination: Catholic
- Education: University of Notre Dame; Saint Mary Seminary; Catholic University of America
- Motto: Gratitas agite Domino (Latin for 'Give thanks to the Lord')^{(Psalm 118:1)}
- Styles
- Reference style: His Excellency; The Most Reverend
- Spoken style: Your Excellency
- Religious style: Bishop

David John Walkowiak (born June 18, 1953) is an American Catholic prelate serving as the twelfth Bishop of Grand Rapids in Michigan since 2013.

== Biography ==
=== Early life ===
Walkowiak was born in East Cleveland, Ohio on June 18, 1953, to John and Virginia Walkowiak. He has three sisters, and the family is of Polish descent. He attended Saint Bernadette School in Westlake and then Saint Ignatius High School in Cleveland. Walkowiak earned a Bachelor of Arts in government and international studies from the University of Notre Dame in Notre Dame, Indiana, in 1975.

Walkowiak entered Saint Mary Seminary in Wickliffe, soon after his college graduation. He received a Master of Divinity from Saint Mary in 1979.

=== Priesthood ===
Walkowiak was ordained to the priesthood at the Cathedral of St. John the Evangelist by Bishop James Aloysius Hickey for the Diocese of Cleveland on June 9, 1979.

After his 1979 ordination, the diocese assigned Walkowiak as pastoral vicar of Saint Mary Parish in Lorain, where he would remain for the next four years. In 1984, he entered Catholic University of America in Washington, D.C. Walkowiak received a Licentiate of Canon Law in 1984 and a Doctor of Canon Law in 1987.

After Walkowiak returned to Cleveland in 1988, Bishop Anthony Michael Pilla appointed him as vice-chancellor and as a professor of canon law at Saint Mary Seminary. In 2006, Walkowiak was also appointed as pastor of Saint Joan of Arc Parish in Chagrin Falls. He also served as a member of the council of priests and as an associate judge of the court of appeals.

=== Bishop of Grand Rapids ===
On April 18, 2013, Pope Francis accepted the resignation of Bishop Walter A. Hurley of Grand Rapids and appointed Walkowiak as his successor. He was consecrated by Archbishop Allen Henry Vigneron on June 18, 2013, at the Cathedral of Saint Andrew in Grand Rapids. Assisting Vigneron as co-consecrators were Bishop Hurley and Bishop Richard Lennon. Apostolic Nuncio Carlo Maria Viganò and twenty other American bishops were also present.

Walkowiak released a statement on November 27, 2019, supporting the decision of Scott Nolan, pastor of St. Stephen Parish in East Grand Rapids, to withhold the Eucharist from Sara Smolenski. A town judge, Smolenski told the local media that Nolan notified her before Mass that she could not receive communion because of her same-sex marriage. She also said that Nolan had given her communion the week before.

On May 27, 2021, Walkowiak announced that Pope Francis had laicized William Langlois. The diocese had received allegations in 2018 that Langlois had sexually abused a parishioner when they were a minor between 1999 and 2006. The diocese immediately suspended Langlois, notified local authorities, and started an internal investigation.

== See also ==
- Catholic Church hierarchy
- Catholic Church in the United States
- Historical list of the Catholic bishops of the United States
- List of Catholic bishops of the United States
- Lists of patriarchs, archbishops, and bishops
