= Cathedral of Saint Andrew (Grand Rapids, Michigan) =

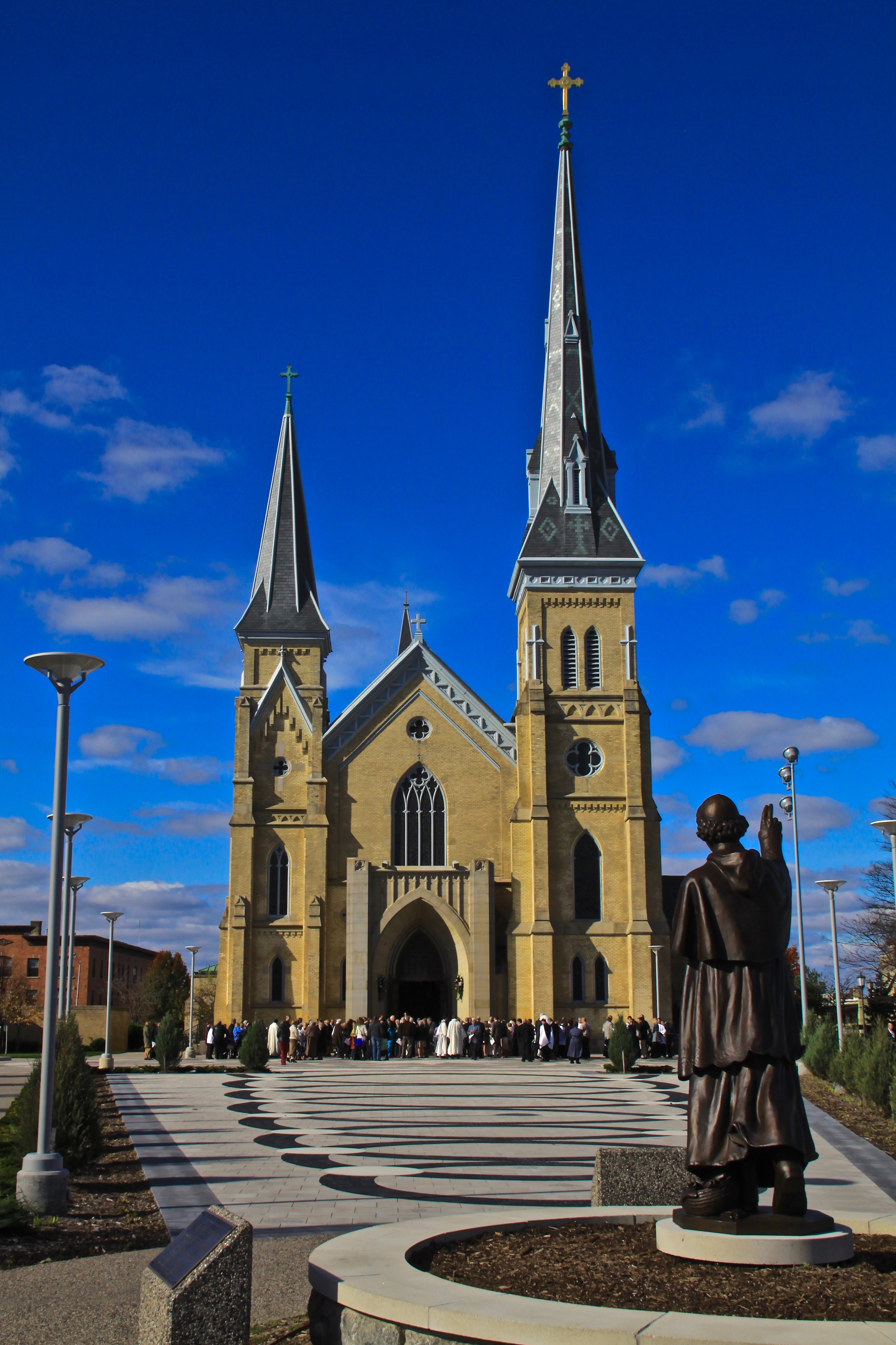
- East façade on the Piazza Secchia

- Location in Michigan
- 42°57′29″N 85°40′02″W
- Location: 215 Sheldon Blvd. SE; Grand Rapids, Michigan
- Country: United States
- Denomination: Roman Catholic Church
- Website: grcathedral.org

History
- Founded: 1833

Architecture
- Style: Gothic Revival
- Completed: 1876

Specifications
- Height: 192 feet (59 m)
- Materials: Limestone

Administration
- Diocese: Grand Rapids

Clergy
- Bishop: Most Rev. David J. Walkowiak
- Rector: Very Rev. Đạt Q. Trần, C.S.P.

The Cathedral of Saint Andrew is a Catholic cathedral located in Grand Rapids, Michigan, United States. It is the seat of the Diocese of Grand Rapids.

== History ==
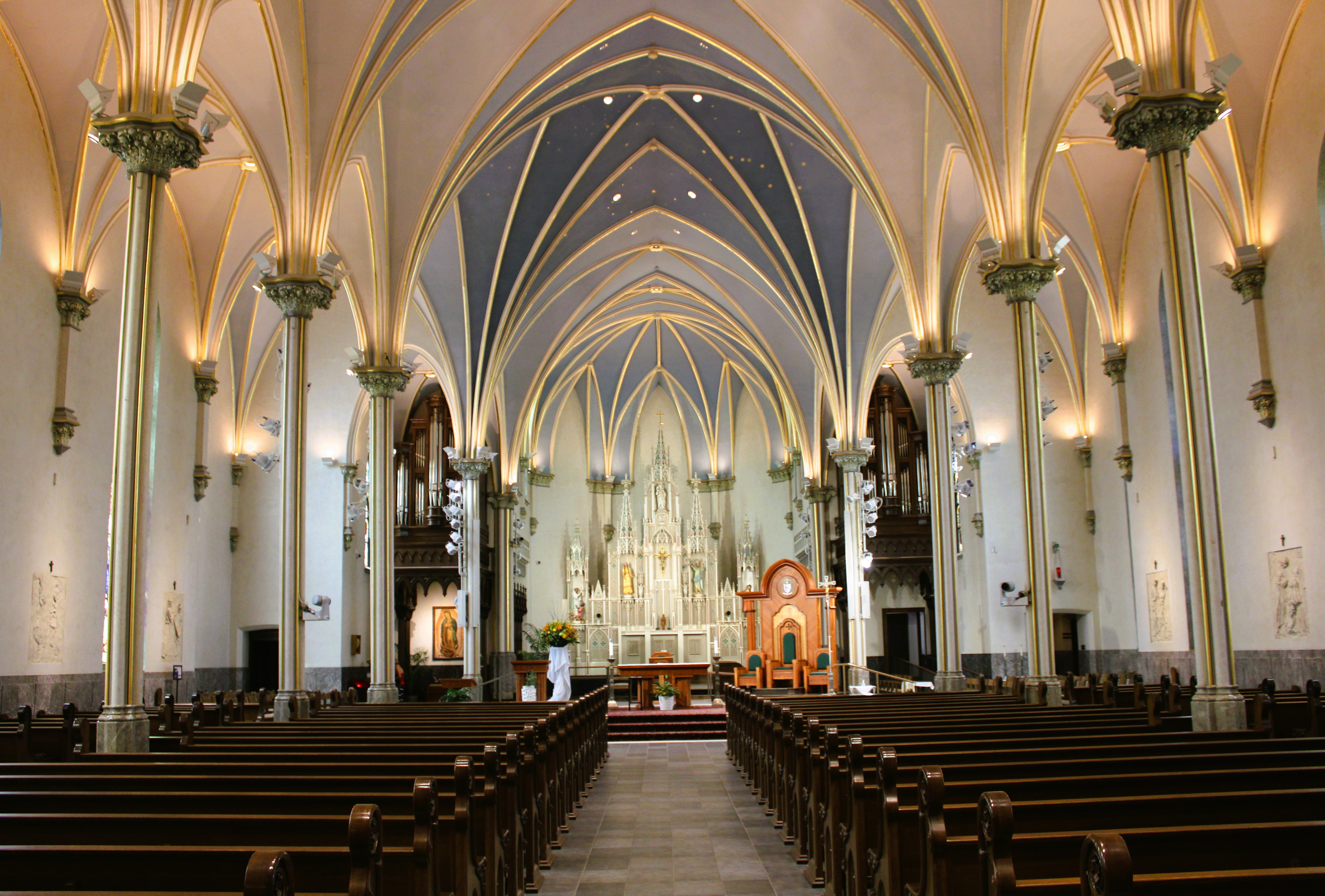
View up the nave to the sanctuary

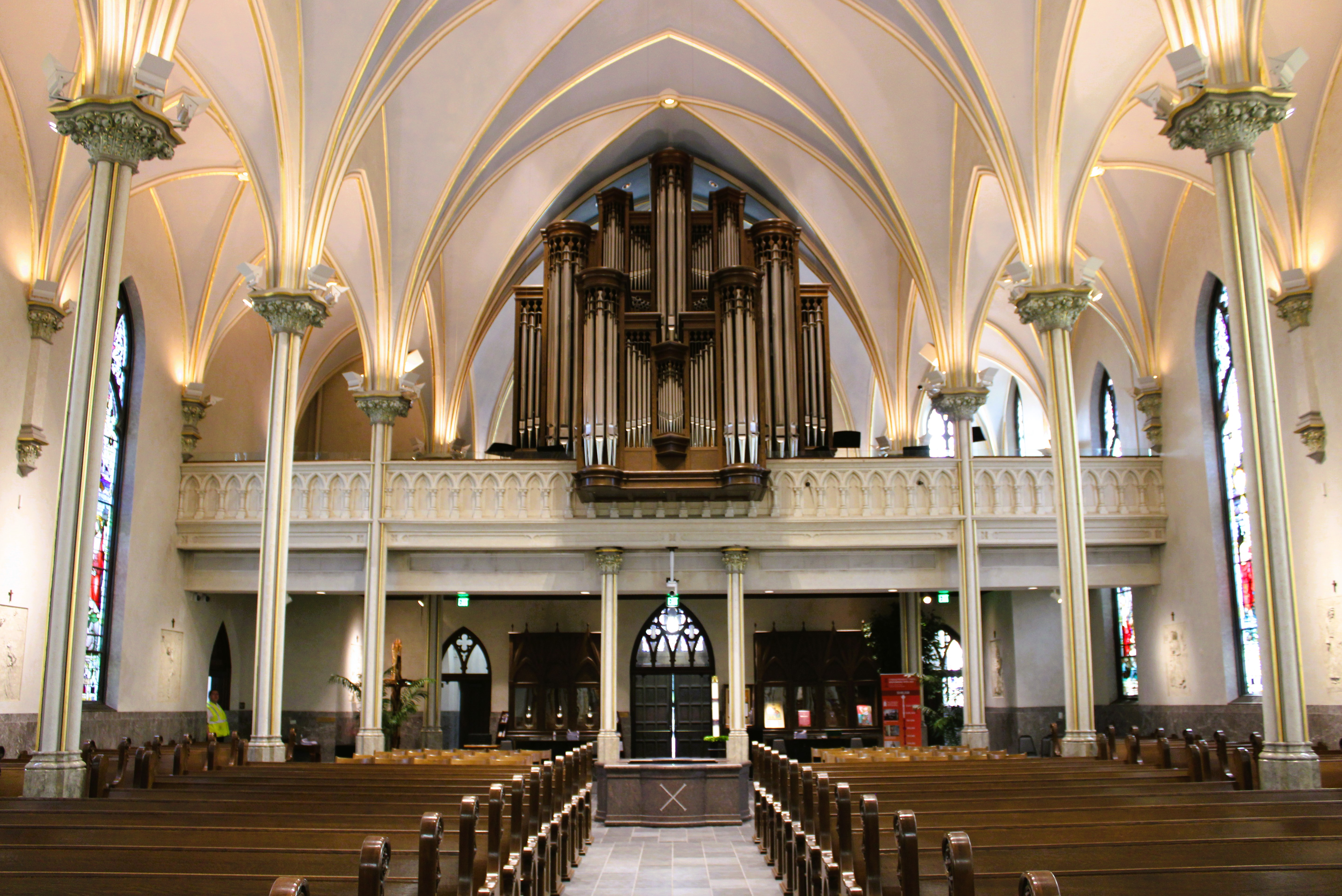
Rear gallery and pipe organ

St. Andrew's history traces its beginning to the founding of St. Mary's Church by the Rev. Frederic Baraga. He built a small church, rectory and school on the west bank of the Grand River and the people who attended the church were Native Americans. The Rev. Andreas Viszoczky was named the parish's first pastor two years later. After the Native Americans left and the town of Grand Rapids grew, Father Viszoczky built a new church on Monroe Street which he named St. Andrew. The church building was constructed of Grand River limestone and completed in 1850.

Grand Rapids continued to grow as did the parish and a new church was soon needed. In 1875, the present church was started on Sheldon Boulevard and completed a year later. On May 19, 1882 Pope Leo XIII established the Diocese of Grand Rapids. The diocese's first bishop Henry J. Richter chose Saint Andrew's as his cathedral and was consecrated in it on April 22, 1883.

Lightning struck the cathedral in 1901 and a fire destroyed part of the church building. It was rebuilt and expanded. Some of the wooden beams above the ceiling still show the charred marks from the fire. A television studio was created in the cathedral in the 1950s to televise a weekly Sunday Mass. The cameras have been updated in the 21st century to provide for digital broadcasts. Another expansion of the cathedral facilities occurred from 1961 to 1963. The St. Ambrose Chapel wing was added at that time and Maple Street from Sheldon to Division was closed and a green space created.

A major renovation of the cathedral in 1979-1980 brought the altar forward into the congregation and a vesting and gathering area was created. Another major renovation from 1997 to 2000 created a baptismal pool and refurbished the stained glass windows and the Stations of the Cross. The current pipe organ was installed in 2002. The front entrance of the cathedral was remodeled in 2009 and the Piazza Secchia was laid. It is patterned after the piazza created by Michelangelo on the Capitoline Hill in Rome.

== See also ==
- List of churches in the Roman Catholic Diocese of Grand Rapids
- List of Catholic cathedrals in the United States
- List of cathedrals in the United States
