= Gaylord, Michigan =

- City
- City of Gaylord
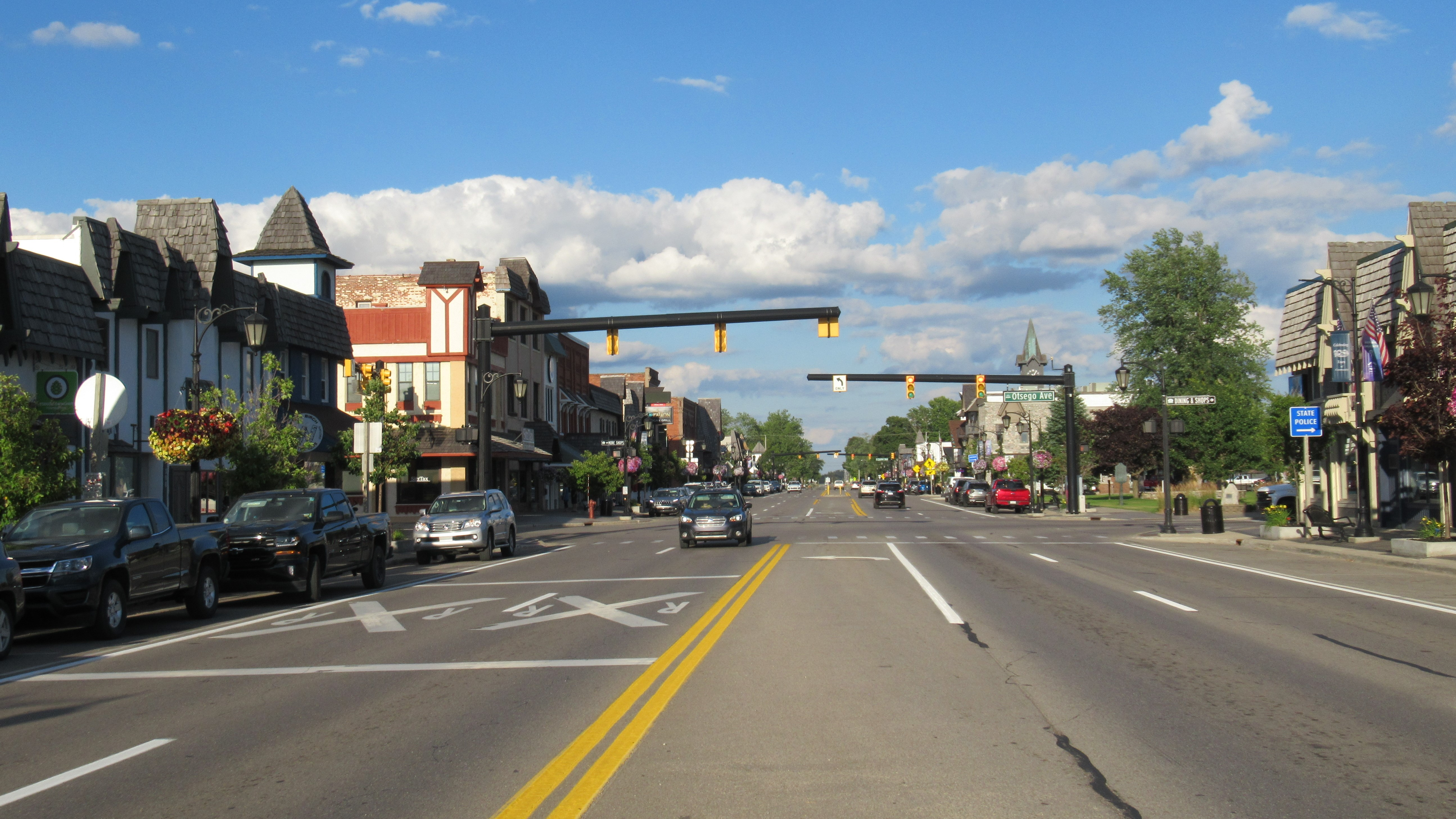
- Looking east along Main Street (M-32)

- Logo
- Nickname: The Alpine Village
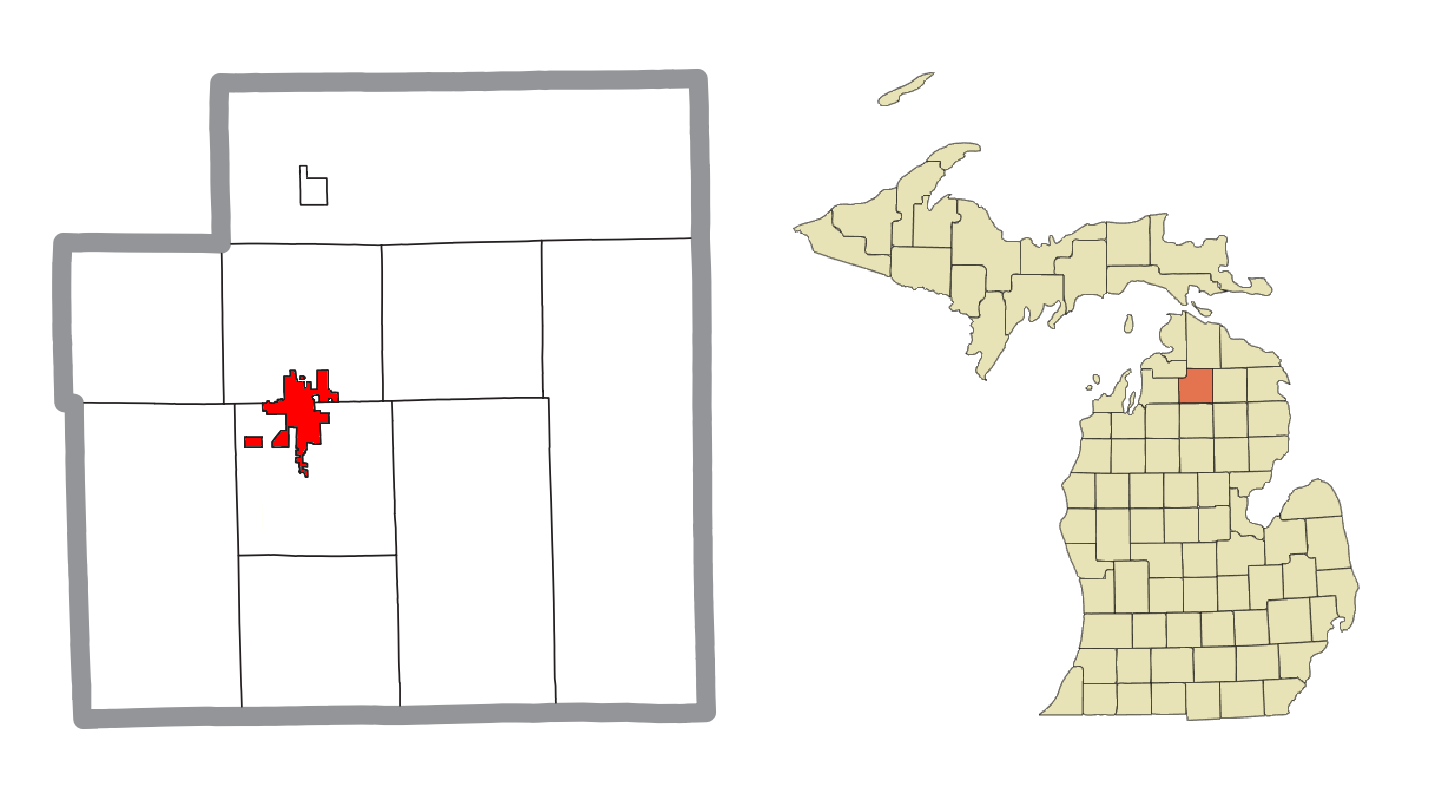
- Location within Otsego County

- Location within the state of Michigan Location within the United States
- Coordinates: 45°01′29″N 84°40′36″W
- Country: United States
- State: Michigan
- County: Otsego
- Platted: 1874
- Incorporated: 1881 (village); 1922 (city)

Government
  - Type: Council–manager
  - Mayor: Todd Sharrard
  - Manager: Kim Awrey
  - Clerk: Jen Molski

Area
  - Total: 5.15 sq mi (13.33 km^{2})
  - Land: 5.12 sq mi (13.27 km^{2})
  - Water: 0.023 sq mi (0.06 km^{2})
- Elevation: 1,348 ft (411 m)

Population (2020)
  - Total: 4,286
  - Density: 836.5/sq mi (322.98/km^{2})
- Time zone: UTC-5 (Eastern (EST))
  - Summer (DST): UTC-4 (EDT)
- ZIP code(s): 49734, 49735
- Area code: 989
- FIPS code: 26-31720
- GNIS feature ID: 0626696
- Website: Official website

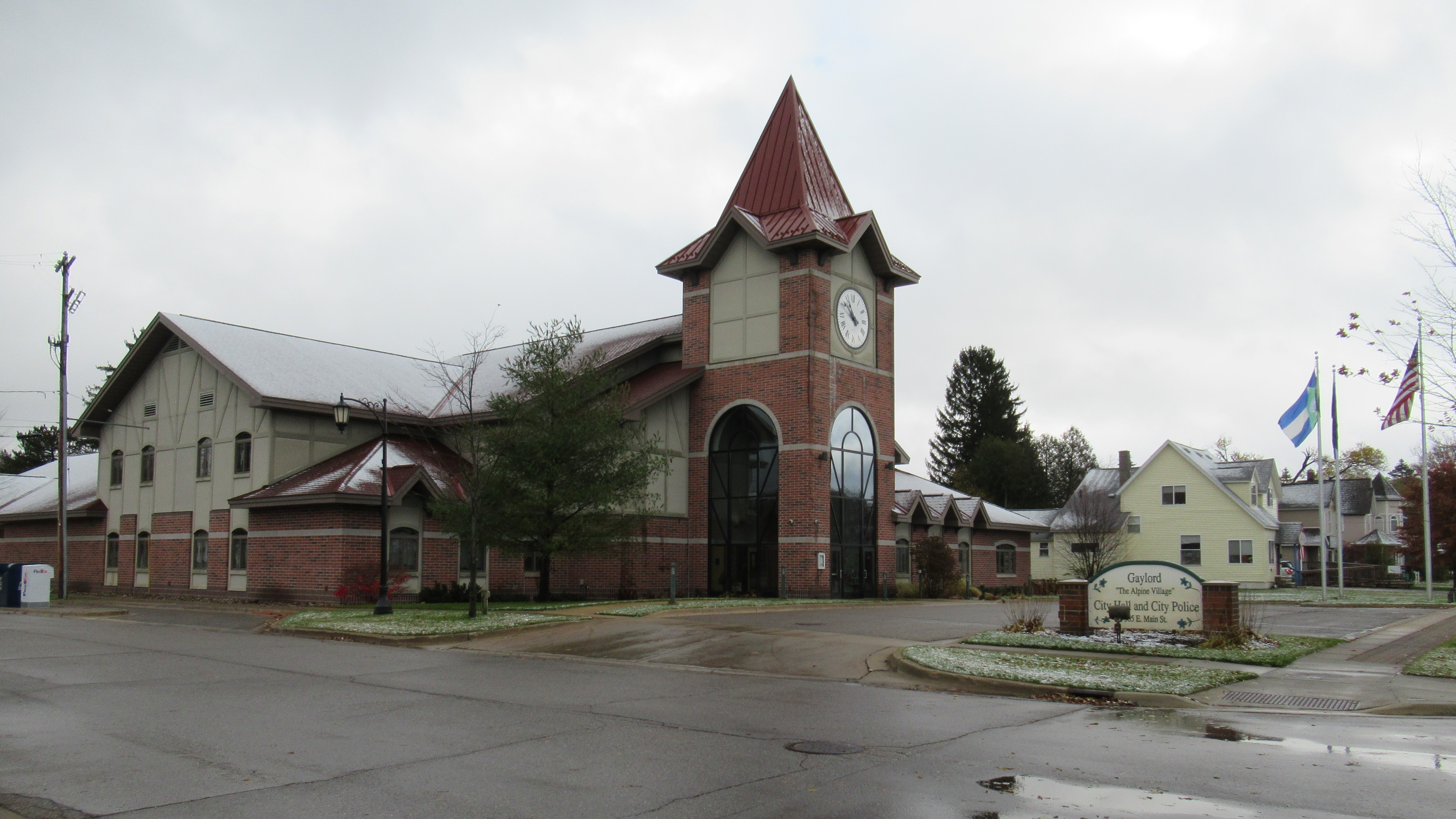
Gaylord City Hall and Police Department

Gaylord (/ˈɡeɪlərd/ GAY-lərd) is a city in the U.S. state of Michigan. It is the county seat of Otsego County, and the only city within the county. Gaylord had a population of 4,286 at the 2020 census, an increase from 3,645 at the 2010 census.

Gaylord styles itself as an "alpine village" and contains many buildings in the downtown area with Tyrolean style motifs. Receiving abundant snowfall and experiencing mild summer temperatures, the area around Gaylord has long been known for its many skiing and golf resorts, one of the largest such concentrations in the Midwestern United States.

== History ==
=== Founding and early years ===
The town was unofficially called Barnes, after secretary of the Michigan Central Railroad and state representative Orlando Barnes, the town was settled in 1873 when the Jackson, Lansing, and Saginaw Railroads were extended north from Otsego Lake Village in the same year. All property north of Main Street was owned by the railroad. Barnes owned all of the property to the south. Main Street was the borderline for two townships. This put the northern half of the new community in Livingston Township and the southern portion in Bagley Township.

The town then became known as the “Village of Gaylord” in 1874, thanks to Augustine Smith Gaylord who was a highly respected lawyer in the village. In the same year, Gaylord was also granted a post office of the same name. If the community was truly ever named Barnes, the name change would have occurred between November 1873 and October 1874. William F. Parmater, a township supervisor, was appointed to find a location for the town's court house in November 1877. Parmater and George Smith, a local store owner, were given land owned by Barnes and his wife to build the court house.

Augustine Smith Gaylord, who is the namesake for the town, was an attorney associated with the Michigan Central Railroad. His law firm was located in Saginaw. Gaylord never lived in his namesake town, but he did own property in Hayes Township. His distinguished career included serving as a school teacher, church choir director, county clerk, and member of the State Legislature, Gaylord was appointed to serve as an attorney for the Department of the Interior in 1875.

Gaylord became the county seat of Otsego County. Prior to 1877, Otsego Lake Village had been designated as the temporary county seat. Gaylord's central location in the county, along with its growing business community, prompted the change. In the same year, the namesake of the town, Augustine Smith Gaylord died at his home in Saginaw at the age of 46. It is believed that a trip to negotiate a treaty with Native American tribes out west in Montana and The Dakotas, at the request of President Ulysses S. Grant was possibly too strenuous for his pre-existing health conditions at the time, which declined his health, which prevented him from returning to Washington.

In 1879, the state legislature appropriated state-owned lands to be exchanged for construction of a state road from Petoskey through Berryville to Gaylord. These lands were originally conveyed to the State of Michigan by the Federal government in 1850 by the Swamp Land Act of 1850.

Gaylord was officially incorporated as a village in 1881, with the first council meeting being held in March of the same year which was presided by Chester C. Mitchell.

=== 20th-century history ===
During the early 20th century, many fires and epidemics swept through the town.

In 1905, a marketing campaign was undertaken to attract outside business investors and new residents to locate in Gaylord. A 38-page photo booklet entitled “Gaylord Illustrated” was published to showcase the many benefits of living in the town. Among the many photographs featured in the booklet were the Otsego County Courthouse and the Dayton Last Block Works. The Dayton Last Block Works was located south and west of downtown Gaylord between the Michigan Central Railroad and U.S. 27. It was bordered on the south by Wisconsin Avenue, and to the north by Third Street. The 14-acre industrial site included 27 buildings, and the owners claimed it to be the largest factory of its kind in world. The company, headquartered in Dayton, Ohio, operated its Gaylord branch from 1895 to 1931.

Otsego County hardwoods were used to produce wooden shoe forms, bowling pins, and golf club heads. One of the original brick buildings still stands on South Otsego Avenue as the Bavarian Office complex.

A second railroad, the Boyne City, Gaylord and Alpena (BC,G&A), reached Gaylord in 1906. This provided east–west rail travel and transportation. The tracks entered Gaylord from Hallock from the northeast. The BC,G&A shared the Michigan Central Railroad depot on Michigan Avenue. Heading east, the tracks paralleled Fourth Street and headed toward the town of Sparr.

Another important manufacturing venture in Gaylord's past was the Gaylord Motor Car Company. Formed in 1910 by local investors who had dreams of becoming the next Detroit, the company offered four innovative styles designed to compete with other automakers. Approximately 350 cars were produced before the company went bankrupt in 1913. The only known Gaylord car still around was a Gaylord 30 restored by Ivan Polus, a resident of Whitefish, Montana, which was then purchased by the Gaylord 30 Car Committee, who bought it for $20,000, the restored car is on display at the Chamber of Commerce in downtown Gaylord.

In 1921, roads were officially paved downtown. Gaylord became a city in 1922. The change from village to city required a vote by town residents. The residents voted in favor 114 to 93, a 21-vote margin. John Hamilton was elected the first mayor of Gaylord. A sewage system was installed in the late 1930s or early 1940s.

Throughout the 20th century Gaylord grew, with summer tourism, winter sports including downhill and cross-country skiing and snowmobiling. In December 1970, a Roman Catholic Diocese was created by Pope Paul VI, and erected it on July 20, 1971, with Edmund Szoka becoming the first bishop of the diocese, and named St. Mary, Our Lady of Mount Carmel Cathedral as the cathedral for the diocese, the current bishop is Jeffrey Walsh.

=== Modern history ===
In 2002, Bishop Patrick R. Cooney allowed Gerald Shirilla to serve as pastor of a church with a school, having known that Shirilla had been removed from the Archdiocese of Detroit in 1993 following decades-long allegations of sexual abuse, After the Detroit Free Press reported on the situation in 2003, Cooney said that Shirilla had made "some errors in judgment" but was "no threat to the well-being of our children," but suspended him two weeks later.

The Edelweiss Village Shopping Center opened in 2004 on Dickerson Road.

On May 20, 2022 an EF3 tornado with winds of 150 miles per hour (240 km/h) struck the city, killing two people and injuring 44. There was major damage to several businesses and a mobile home park. Incumbent Michigan governor Gretchen Whitmer declared a state of emergency for the Gaylord area and stated that Lansing will provide reconstruction to Gaylord. This tornado was the first to hit the city since records began in 1950.

In 2023, Gaylord's high school softball team won their first state championship, defeating Vicksburg 8–3, the team set a MHSAA home run record (72) in their championship season, and the team would repeat as champions again in 2024, defeating Vicksburg 3–2.

== Geography ==
- According to the United States Census Bureau, the city has a total area of 4.83 square miles (12.51 km^{2}), of which, 4.80 square miles (12.43 km^{2}) is land and 0.03 square miles (0.08 km^{2}) is water.
- Gaylord experiences heavy lake effect snow during the winter and is in the middle of the Northern Michigan snowbelt.
- Highway signs denote that Gaylord rests on the 45th parallel line – halfway between the equator and the North Pole. This is one of 29 places (six are in Michigan) in the U.S. where such signs are known to exist.
- It is considered to be part of Northern Michigan.
- Hartwick Pines State Park is just 28 miles (45 km) to the south, and is one of the last remaining stands of old growth virgin Eastern white pine forest.
- The Huron-Manistee National Forests is nearby.

=== Climate ===
This climatic region has large seasonal temperature differences, with warm to hot (and often humid) summers and cold (sometimes severely cold) winters. According to the Köppen Climate Classification system, Gaylord has a humid continental climate, abbreviated "Dfb" on climate maps.

Climate data for Gaylord, Michigan (1991–2020 normals, extremes 1893–2022)
Month	Jan	Feb	Mar	Apr	May	Jun	Jul	Aug	Sep	Oct	Nov	Dec	Year
Record high °F (°C)	53 (12)	60 (16)	84 (29)	88 (31)	95 (35)	100 (38)	101 (38)	99 (37)	96 (36)	86 (30)	75 (24)	65 (18)	101 (38)
Mean maximum °F (°C)	43.0 (6.1)	46.4 (8.0)	59.0 (15.0)	73.2 (22.9)	83.7 (28.7)	88.4 (31.3)	88.9 (31.6)	87.6 (30.9)	83.5 (28.6)	75.1 (23.9)	60.3 (15.7)	47.4 (8.6)	91.3 (32.9)
Mean daily maximum °F (°C)	23.5 (−4.7)	25.6 (−3.6)	36.6 (2.6)	50.0 (10.0)	64.0 (17.8)	73.4 (23.0)	77.3 (25.2)	75.2 (24.0)	67.6 (19.8)	53.9 (12.2)	39.8 (4.3)	29.0 (−1.7)	51.3 (10.7)
Daily mean °F (°C)	15.9 (−8.9)	16.4 (−8.7)	26.0 (−3.3)	38.7 (3.7)	52.1 (11.2)	61.9 (16.6)	66.0 (18.9)	64.3 (17.9)	56.9 (13.8)	44.4 (6.9)	32.3 (0.2)	22.6 (−5.2)	41.5 (5.3)
Mean daily minimum °F (°C)	8.4 (−13.1)	7.2 (−13.8)	15.4 (−9.2)	27.3 (−2.6)	40.1 (4.5)	50.5 (10.3)	54.8 (12.7)	53.3 (11.8)	46.2 (7.9)	34.8 (1.6)	24.9 (−3.9)	16.1 (−8.8)	31.6 (−0.2)
Mean minimum °F (°C)	−10.4 (−23.6)	−10.8 (−23.8)	−6.1 (−21.2)	13.4 (−10.3)	27.1 (−2.7)	36.5 (2.5)	42.8 (6.0)	42.2 (5.7)	32.7 (0.4)	23.6 (−4.7)	10.2 (−12.1)	−1.4 (−18.6)	−16.1 (−26.7)
Record low °F (°C)	−32 (−36)	−37 (−38)	−27 (−33)	−7 (−22)	12 (−11)	22 (−6)	30 (−1)	26 (−3)	22 (−6)	10 (−12)	−8 (−22)	−27 (−33)	−37 (−38)
Average precipitation inches (mm)	2.83 (72)	2.01 (51)	2.16 (55)	2.92 (74)	3.22 (82)	3.16 (80)	3.09 (78)	3.40 (86)	3.74 (95)	4.08 (104)	3.36 (85)	2.96 (75)	36.93 (938)
Average snowfall inches (cm)	37.4 (95)	26.4 (67)	14.9 (38)	8.0 (20)	0.5 (1.3)	0.0 (0.0)	0.0 (0.0)	0.0 (0.0)	0.0 (0.0)	2.5 (6.4)	19.2 (49)	31.4 (80)	140.3 (356)
Average extreme snow depth inches (cm)	19.7 (50)	21.3 (54)	18.1 (46)	5.2 (13)	0.2 (0.51)	0.0 (0.0)	0.0 (0.0)	0.0 (0.0)	0.0 (0.0)	1.2 (3.0)	7.6 (19)	14.2 (36)	23.6 (60)
Average precipitation days (≥ 0.01 in)	17.1	13.3	10.6	10.9	11.0	9.2	9.5	9.5	10.5	13.9	13.9	16.9	146.3
Average snowy days (≥ 0.1 in)	16.7	14.3	7.9	4.1	0.3	0.0	0.0	0.0	0.0	1.6	8.4	14.9	67.3
Source: NOAA

== Demographics ==
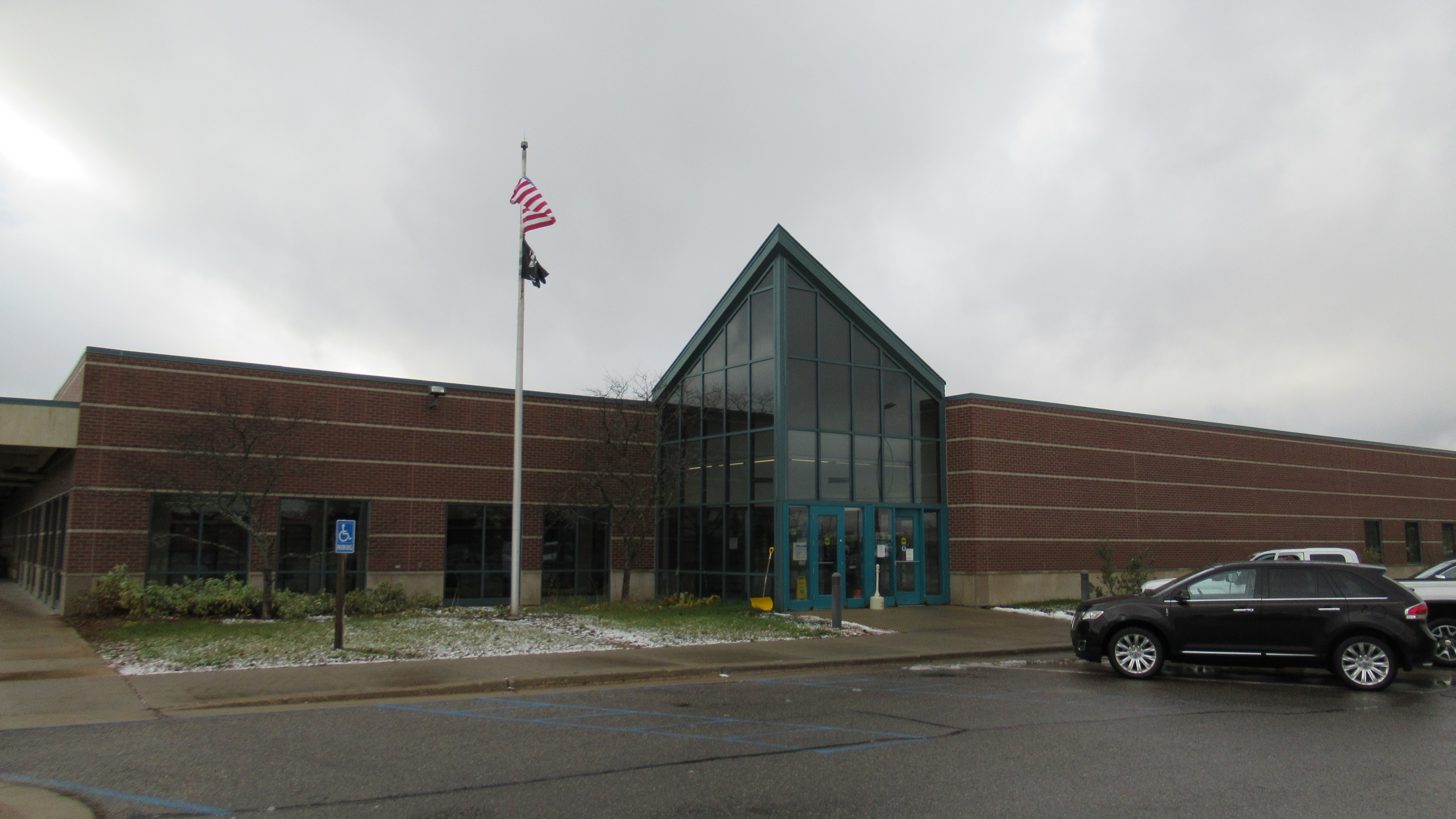
U.S. Post Office in Gaylord

Historical population
Census	Pop.	Note	%±
1880	292		—
1890	661		126.4%
1900	1,561		136.2%
1910	1,538		−1.5%
1920	1,701		10.6%
1930	1,627		−4.4%
1940	2,055		26.3%
1950	2,271		10.5%
1960	2,568		13.1%
1970	3,012		17.3%
1980	3,011		0.0%
1990	3,256		8.1%
2000	3,681		13.1%
2010	3,645		−1.0%
2020	4,286		17.6%
U.S. Decennial Census

=== 2020 census ===
As of the 2020 census, Gaylord had a population of 4,286. The median age was 38.4 years. 22.6% of residents were under the age of 18 and 21.2% of residents were 65 years of age or older. For every 100 females there were 89.7 males, and for every 100 females age 18 and over there were 82.5 males age 18 and over.

98.4% of residents lived in urban areas, while 1.6% lived in rural areas.

There were 1,928 households in Gaylord, of which 27.1% had children under the age of 18 living in them. Of all households, 26.5% were married-couple households, 23.7% were households with a male householder and no spouse or partner present, and 40.6% were households with a female householder and no spouse or partner present. About 44.5% of all households were made up of individuals and 21.5% had someone living alone who was 65 years of age or older.

There were 2,075 housing units, of which 7.1% were vacant. The homeowner vacancy rate was 2.0% and the rental vacancy rate was 4.4%.

Racial composition as of the 2020 census
Race	Number	Percent
White	3,924	91.6%
Black or African American	48	1.1%
American Indian and Alaska Native	32	0.7%
Asian	18	0.4%
Native Hawaiian and Other Pacific Islander	0	0.0%
Some other race	34	0.8%
Two or more races	230	5.4%
Hispanic or Latino (of any race)	108	2.5%

=== 2010 census ===
As of the census of 2010, there were 3,645 people, 1,610 households, and 826 families residing in the city. The population density was 759.4 inhabitants per square mile (293.2/km^{2}). There were 1,847 housing units at an average density of 384.8 units per square mile (148.6 units/km^{2}). The racial makeup of the city was 94.8% White, 0.9% African American, 0.8% Native American, 1.0% Asian, 0.2% from other races, and 2.3% from two or more races. Hispanic or Latino of any race were 1.8% of the population.

There were 1,610 households, of which 27.8% had children under the age of 18 living with them, 33.7% were married couples living together, 13.5% had a female householder with no husband present, 4.1% had a male householder with no wife present, and 48.7% were non-families. 42.0% of all households were made up of individuals, and 19.1% had someone living alone who was 65 years of age or older. The average household size was 2.14 and the average family size was 2.95.

The median age in the city was 39.3 years. 22.7% of residents were under the age of 18; 10.9% were between the ages of 18 and 24; 23.2% were from 25 to 44; 23.2% were from 45 to 64; and 20% were 65 years of age or older. The gender makeup of the city was 45.9% male and 54.1% female.

=== 2000 census ===
As of the census of 2000, there were 3,681 people, 1,584 households, and 888 families residing in the city. The population density was 932.8 inhabitants per square mile (360.2/km^{2}). There were 1,773 housing units at an average density of 449.3 units per square mile (173.5 units/km^{2}). The racial makeup of the city was 96.50% White, 0.30% African American, 0.95% Native American, 0.30% Asian, 0.08% Pacific Islander, 0.33% from other races, and 1.55% from two or more races. Hispanic or Latino of any race were 1.71% of the population.

There were 1,584 households, out of which 29.0% had children under the age of 18 living with them, 38.8% were married couples living together, 13.4% had a female householder with no husband present, and 43.9% were non-families. 38.1% of all households were made up of individuals, and 19.0% had someone living alone who was 65 years of age or older. The average household size was 2.22 and the average family size was 2.97.

In the city, the population was spread out, with 24.9% under the age of 18, 9.4% from 18 to 24, 26.6% from 25 to 44, 18.6% from 45 to 64, and 20.4% who were 65 years of age or older. The median age was 38 years. For every 100 females, there were 79.4 males. For every 100 females age 18 and over, there were 76.0 males.

The median income for a household in the city was $28,770, and the median income for a family was $36,654. Males had a median income of $33,264 versus $19,815 for females. The per capita income for the city was $17,313. About 8.8% of families and 9.7% of the population were below the poverty line, including 8.8% of those under age 18 and 13.6% of those age 65 or over.

== Transportation ==
- I-75 passes to the west of the city and connects with the Mackinac Bridge to the north and Saginaw and Detroit to the south
- BL I-75 is a loop route running through Gaylord. It follows the former route of US 27, in part, and was commissioned in 1986. The highway returns to I-75.
- M-32 passes east–west through the city. Although it is not a true 'cross-peninsular' highway—crosses the lower peninsula from Lake Michigan to Lake Huron—it is close.
- C-42 terminates at M-32 west of the city. It originates at US 131 in Alba.
- F-42 begins at BL I-75 (Old US 27) south of the city and proceeds easterly to M-32 southeast of Gaylord.
- F-44 begins at M-32 east of the city and continues easterly through Sparr to F-01.
- Old 27 is the former route of US 27 and is a major north–south local route through the city and the rest of Otsego County.
- Gaylord Regional Airport is located at 1100 Aero Drive, Gaylord, MI 49735. (989) 732-4218 Phone. It is owned and operated by the County of Otsego. The Airport is licensed by the Michigan Aeronautics Commission as a General Utility Airport. It is listed as a tier one airport in all categories of the Michigan Airport System Plan.
- Indian Trails provides daily intercity bus service between St. Ignace and East Lansing, Michigan.

== Recreation ==
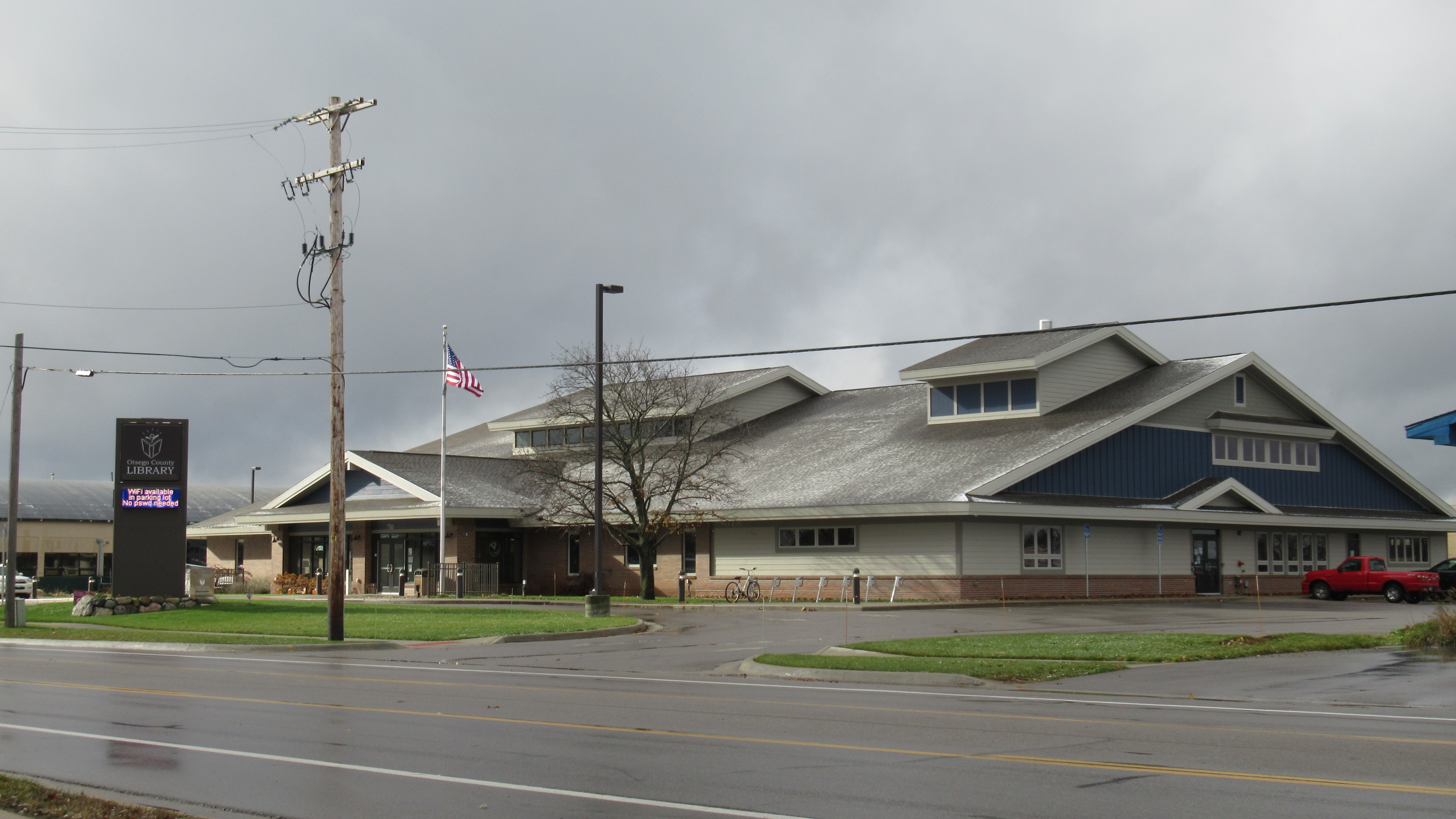
Otsego County Library in Gaylord

Gaylord sees significant snowfall during winter due to its elevation and its location in the path of lake-effect snow produced by Lake Michigan. Combined with local terrain and topography, many winter recreation opportunities abound.

- Much of the old train system has been converted to trails for biking or Snow Mobile riding. The North Central State Trail north to Mackinaw City is a Rails to trails converted remnant of a spur line of the Michigan Central Railroad that used to serve Gaylord.
- Fall colors and snowshoeing are highlights in several of the local parks.
- Cross country skiing is an important tourist activity near Gaylord. There are two venues Hartwick Pines State Park Trails and Mason Tract Pathway nearby.
- Downhill skiing and snowboarding are also highly accessible with several resorts operating in the area.
- Water skiing, wakeboarding, and jetskiing are also available on Otsego Lake.
- Otsego Lake State Park, swimming, boating, and camping.

== Twin town ==
Gaylord is twinned with the Swiss town of Pontresina.

== Media ==
- Local newspaper Gaylord Herald Times serves the area.
- Regionally available is the Weekly Choice Publication.
- WMJZ, "Eagle" 101.5 FM, features a classic hits format and is the primary local (Gaylord/Otsego County-focused) commercial radio station.
- Also licensed to Gaylord are WBLW 88.1 FM of Grace Baptist Church and WPHN 90.5 FM (The Promise FM), which both feature non-commercial Christian religious programming. Also, Charlevoix-based Catholic radio station WTCK operates a translator in Gaylord at 92.1 FM.
- WSRT 106.7 FM, a talk radio station (formerly WKPK "The Peak," a locally legendary top 40 station) which, although licensed to Gaylord, is based in Traverse City.
- WQON, Q100.3, The Only Place for Rock & Roll and play-by-play for Detroit Lions Football and University of Michigan Football/Basketball.
- WGRY AM/FM, Y101.1/AM1230, YOUR Sports Talk in Northern Michigan, CBS Sports Talk and home of Detroit Tiger Baseball, Detroit Red Wing Hockey, and Detroit Pistons Basketball.

Gaylord is also served by radio and TV broadcasts from Traverse City, Petoskey, Charlevoix, Cadillac, Grayling, Houghton Lake, Cheboygan, and Alpena.

== Notable people ==
- Ken Borton, politician and state representative
- Patrick R. Cooney (1934–2012), bishop
- Bob Davis (politician) (1932–2009), politician and lobbiyst
- Bernard Hebda (born 1959), archbishop
- Harry Melling (NASCAR owner) (1945–1999), NASCAR owner
- Steven J. Raica (born 1953), bishop
- Robert John Rose (1930–2022), bishop
- Claude Shannon (1916–2001), the "father of information theory"
- Edmund Szoka (1927–2014), priest and cardinal

== See also ==
- Let Us Prey: A Ministry of Scandals
