= Patrick R. Cooney =

Catholic bishop in the United States

His Excellency, The Most Reverend Patrick Ronald Cooney
- Bishop of Gaylord; Titular Bishop of Hodelm
- Church: Roman Catholic Church
- See: Diocese of Gaylord
- In office: 1990 to 2012
- Predecessor: Robert John Rose
- Successor: Bernard Hebda
- Previous posts: Auxiliary Bishop of Detroit (1983 to 1989)

Orders
- Ordination: December 20, 1959 by Martin John O'Connor
- Consecration: January 27, 1983 by Edmund Szoka

Personal details
- Born: March 10, 1934 Detroit, Michigan, US
- Died: October 15, 2012 (aged 78)
- Education: Sacred Heart Major Seminary; Pontifical Gregorian University; University of Notre Dame

Styles of Patrick R. Cooney
- Reference style: The Most Reverend
- Spoken style: Your Excellency
- Religious style: Monsignor
- Posthumous style: not applicable

Patrick Ronald Cooney (March 10, 1934 – October 15, 2012) was an American prelate of the Roman Catholic Church. He served as the third bishop of Gaylord in Michigan from 1990 to 2012. He previously served as an auxiliary bishop of the Archdiocese of Detroit in Michigan from 1982 to 1989.

== Early life ==
Patrick Cooney was born on March 10, 1934, in Detroit, Michigan, to Michael and Elizabeth (née Dowdall) Cooney. The oldest of four children, he had two sisters, Mary, a teacher with the Detroit Public School System and Leontia, an Adrian Dominican nun. His brother Michael was a priest of the Archdiocese of Detroit.

Cooney attended St. Edward Elementary School from 1940 to 1948, and Sacred Heart Seminary High School from 1948 to 1952. Deciding to become a priest, he entered Sacred Heart Major Seminary in Detroit, receiving a Bachelor of Arts degree in philosophy in 1956. He then went to Rome to study at the Pontifical Gregorian University, earning a Bachelor of Sacred Theology degree in 1958.

== Priesthood ==
Cooney was ordained to the priesthood in Rome by Bishop Martin J. O'Connor in the chapel of the Pontifical North American College on December 20, 1959. He obtained a Licentiate in Sacred Theology from the Gregorian in 1960. Upon his return to the United States, he served as an assistant pastor at St. Catherine Parish in Detroit (1960 – 1962), assistant chancellor of the archdiocese (1962 – 1969), and chaplain at Mercy College in Detroit(1967 – 1972).

From 1969 to 1983, Cooney served as director of the archdiocesan Department of Worship. He also pursued his graduate work at the University of Notre Dame in Indiana, and there earned a Master of Arts degree in liturgical research in 1973. He was named, in addition to his role as director of worship, rector of the Cathedral of the Most Blessed Sacrament in Detroit in 1977.

== Episcopal career ==
=== Auxiliary Bishop of Detroit ===
On December 3, 1982, Cooney was appointed auxiliary bishop of Detroit and titular bishop of Hodelm by Pope John Paul II. He received his episcopal consecration on January 27, 1983, from Archbishop Edmund Szoka, with Bishops Harold Perry and Arthur Krawczak serving as co-consecrators, at the Cathedral of the Most Blessed Sacrament.

In addition to his duties as an auxiliary bishop, Cooney was the founding chair of the archdiocese's Church in the City Task Force from 1983 to 1990. He also served as liaison to the Catholic chaplains of Region VI (Michigan and Ohio) from 1987 to 1991, and as a board member for Notre Dame Center for Liturgy at the University of Notre Dame (1987–1991) and for the North American College (1988–1994).

=== Bishop of Gaylord ===
Cooney was named the third bishop of Gaylord on November 6, 1989 by Pope John Paul II. Cooney was installed as bishop in Gaylord, Michigan, on January 28, 1990.

Within the United States Conference of Catholic Bishops, Cooney was a member of the Committee on Liturgy (1984 – 1996), the Subcommittee of Bishops and Scholars (1988 – 1992), and the National Advisory Council (1995 – 1998); and chair of the Subcommittee on Use of Exclusive Language in Liturgy (1989 – 1991), the Subcommittee on Book of Blessings (1989 – 1991), and the Subcommittee on Cremation and Other Funeral Questions (1989 – 1993). He also co-chaired the Roman Catholic-Reformed Church Dialogue Committee from 1998 to 2001. From 1993 to 1998, Cooney served as a board member of the National Institute for the Word of God and of Sacred Heart Major Seminary.

In 2002, Cooney allowed Reverend Gerald Shirilla to serve as pastor of a church with a school, despite knowing that Shirilla had been removed from the Archdiocese of Detroit in 1993 following decades-long allegations of sexual abuse. After the Detroit Free Press reported on the situation in 2003, Cooney said that Shirilla had made "some errors in judgment" but was "no threat to the well-being of our children". Two weeks later, Cooney suspended Shirilla from ministry.

In 2004, Cooney became a board member of Catholic Relief Services. Cooney in 2008 suffered a heart attack while preparing for an ordination ceremony. He then underwent quadruple bypass surgery at Munson Medical Center in Traverse City, Michigan.

=== Retirement and death ===
Cooney retired as bishop of Gaylord on October 7, 2009. He died on October 15, 2012.

== Pastoral letters ==
- "An Agenda for the Church in Gaylord" (1991)
- "The Sequence for the Celebration of the Sacraments of Initiation of Children in the Diocese of Gaylord" (2001)
- "Catechesis: The Primary Goal of the Church" (2006)

Catholic Church titles
Preceded by Robert John Rose	Bishop of Gaylord; 1989–2009	Succeeded by Bernard Hebda
