= Joseph Crescent McKinney =

Joseph Crescent McKinney (September 10, 1928 – June 9, 2010) was a late 20th-century and early 21st-century bishop of the Catholic Church in the United States. He served as auxiliary bishop of the Diocese of Grand Rapids in the state of Michigan from 1968-2001.

== Biography ==
=== Early life and ministry ===
Joseph McKinney was born in Grand Rapids, Michigan to Joseph and Antoinette McKinney. He was the oldest of four children. He grew up attending St. Mary’s Church and was educated at the parish grade school. He attended high school at St. Joseph Seminary in Grand Rapids and college at the Seminaire de Philosophie in Montreal, Quebec, Canada. McKinney studied for the priesthood at the Pontifical Urban University in Rome, where he received a licentiate in sacred theology. He was ordained a priest for the Diocese of Grand Rapids on December 20, 1953 at the Chapel of Propaganda Fide. From 1953-1962 Father McKinney served on the faculty of St. Joseph Seminary. From 1962-1968 he served as a parish priest in Indian River, Mt. Pleasant and Conklin.

=== Auxiliary Bishop of Grand Rapids ===
On July 24, 1968 Pope Paul VI named McKinney Titular Bishop of the Roman Catholic Diocese of Lentini and the Auxiliary Bishop of Grand Rapids. He was ordained a bishop by Archbishop John Francis Dearden of Detroit on September 26, 1968. Bishops Allen James Babcock of Grand Rapids and Charles Salatka of Marquette acted as principal co-consecrators. In addition to Bishop Babcock, he served as auxiliary bishop to Bishops Joseph M. Breitenbeck and Robert John Rose.

As auxiliary bishop, McKinney served as diocesan vicar general, rector of the Cathedral of Saint Andrew, as a member of the diocesan College of Consultors, as well as other boards and committees of the diocese. While auxiliary bishop he served as pastor of St. Stephen’s Church in East Grand Rapids, Holy Trinity Church in Alpine and Our Lady of Consolation Church in Rockford. He also served as the national liaison to the charismatic renewal for the Catholic bishops of the United States.

On October 3, 2001, Pope John Paul II accepted Bishop McKinney’s resignation as auxiliary bishop. He had served the Grand Rapids diocese for 33 years in that capacity. Following his retirement, Bishop McKinney continued to assist the diocesan bishop in liturgical ceremonies and in whatever way needed. He died at the age of 81 after an extended illness.
