= St. Mary Cathedral High School (Michigan) =

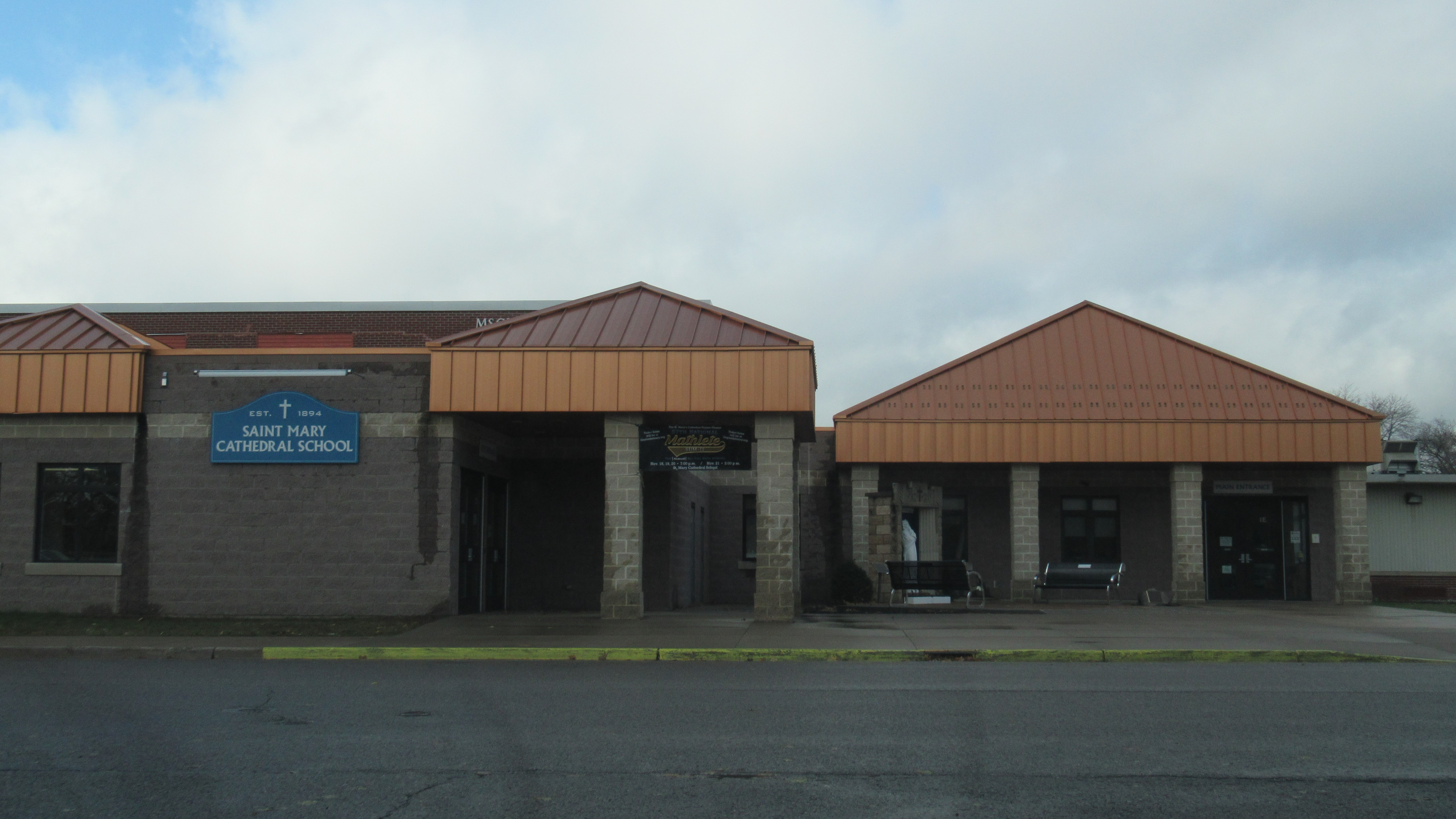

Location
- 321 North Otsego Avenue; Gaylord, Michigan 49735; United States; 45°1′50″N 84°40′39″W

Information
- Type: Private, Coeducational
- Religious affiliation: Roman Catholic
- Established: 1925
- Oversight: Diocese of Gaylord
- Principal: Jerry Belanger
- Teaching staff: 18.8 (on a FTE basis)
- Grades: PK–12
- Enrollment: 331, including 60 PK students (2013-14)
- Student to teacher ratio: 14.4
- Colors: Blue and White
- Athletics conference: Ski Valley Conference
- Nickname: Snowbirds
- Affiliation: National Catholic Educational Association (NCEA)
- Website: www.gaylordstmary.org

St. Mary Cathedral High School is a private, Roman Catholic high school in Gaylord, Michigan. It is located in the Roman Catholic Diocese of Gaylord. As of 2019, the principal is Jerry Belanger.

== History ==
St. Mary Cathedral School was established in 1894. A high school was added in 1925.

== Athletics ==
St. Mary's is a member of the Ski Valley Conference. The school colors are blue and white. The following MHSAA sanctioned sports are offered:

- Baseball (boys)
- Basketball (boys & girls)
- Cross country (boys & girls)
- Football (boys)
- Golf (boys)
- Ice hockey (boys)
- Softball (girls)
- Track and field (boys & girls)
- Volleyball (girls)
