= Francis Haas =

Francis Haas may refer to:

- Francis Townley Haas (born 1996), American swimmer
- Francis J. Haas (1889–1953), American Roman Catholic bishop
