= Robert John Rose =

American Roman Catholic priest and bishop (1930–2022)

His Excellency, The Most Reverend Robert John Rose
- Bishop of Grand Rapids
- See: Diocese of Grand Rapids
- Appointed: June 24, 1989
- Installed: August 30, 1989
- Term ended: October 13, 2003
- Predecessor: Joseph Matthew Breitenbeck
- Successor: Kevin Michael Britt
- Previous posts: Bishop of Gaylord (1981–1989)

Orders
- Ordination: December 21, 1955 by Clemente Micara
- Consecration: December 6, 1981 by Edmund Casimir Szoka, Joseph Matthew Breitenbeck, and Joseph Crescent McKinney

Personal details
- Born: February 28, 1930 Grand Rapids, Michigan, USA
- Died: March 2, 2022 (aged 92) Grand Rapids
- Denomination: Roman Catholic
- Education: St. Joseph's Seminary; Grand Seminary of Montreal; Pontifical Urban College; University of Michigan
- Motto: In the name of the Lord!

Styles of Robert John Rose
- Reference style: His Excellency; The Most Reverend
- Spoken style: Your Excellency
- Religious style: Bishop

Robert John Rose (February 28, 1930 – March 2, 2022) was an American prelate of the Roman Catholic Church. Rose served as bishop of the Diocese of Gaylord in Michigan from 1981 to 1989 and as bishop of the Diocese of Grand Rapids in Michigan from 1989 to 2003.

== Biography ==
=== Early life ===
Robert Rose was born in Grand Rapids, Michigan, on February 28, 1930, to Urban Henry and Maida Ann (née Glerum) Rose. Rose attended St. Francis Xavier School in Grand Rapids and in 1944 entered St. Joseph's Seminary in the same city. In 1950, Rose completed his final two years of college at the Grand Seminary of Montreal. In 1952, Rose entered the Pontifical Urban College in Rome, where he earned a Licentiate of Sacred Theology in 1956.

=== Priesthood ===
On December 21, 1955, Rose was ordained to the priesthood for the Diocese of Grand Rapids at the Pontifical Urban College by Cardinal Clemente Micara. Following his return to Grand Rapids, Rose became a professor at St. Joseph's Seminary in August 1956. Working there for 13 years, he taught religion, Latin, Greek, French and music (chant). Rose earned a Master of Arts degree from the University of Michigan in 1962.

In July 1966, Rose became dean of the college department at St. Joseph's Seminary, and served as director of the deacon program from 1969 to 1971. In June 1971, he was appointed rector of St. John's Provincial Seminary in Plymouth, Michigan. In August 1977, Rose was named pastor of Sacred Heart Parish in Muskegon Heights, Michigan.

=== Bishop of Gaylord ===
On October 13, 1981, Pope John Paul II appointed Rose as the second bishop of Gaylord. He was consecrated on December 6, 1981, by Archbishop Edmund Szoka, with Bishops Joseph M. Breitenbeck and Joseph McKinney serving as co-consecrators, at St. Mary's Cathedral in Gaylord, Michigan. Rose chose as his episcopal motto the Biblical phrase "in the Name of the Lord!".

=== Bishop of Grand Rapids ===
On June 24, 1989, John Paul II appointed Rose as the ninth bishop of Grand Rapids. He was installed in Grand Rapids, Michigan, on August 30, 1989. Rose created lay leadership programs, revamped the Hispanic ministry and presented forums and events focused on racism in the diocese. He established the Catholic Foundation of West Michigan among other institutions.

In 2002, the diocese acknowledged that it had paid a $500,000 settlement in 1994 to three women who were sexually abused as minors by Reverend John Thomas Sullivan, a diocesan priest, during the late 1950s. The women did not report the crimes to the diocese until 1993. Records showed that Bishop Allen Babcock, a previous bishop, had accepted Sullivan into the diocese even though Sullivan had previously fathered a child in the Diocese of Manchester in New Hampshire. Rose said that it should have never happened.

=== Personal life ===
On October 13, 2003, John Paul II accepted Rose's retirement as bishop of Grand Rapids. He moved to St. Camillus Woods, a residence for retired priests, in Byron Township, Michigan. Robert Rose died in Grand Rapids on March 2, 2022, at the age of 92.

== See also ==
- Catholic Church hierarchy
- Catholic Church in the United States
- Historical list of the Catholic bishops of the United States
- List of Catholic bishops of the United States
- Lists of patriarchs, archbishops, and bishops

== Episcopal succession ==
Catholic Church titles
Preceded by Joseph M. Breitenbeck	Bishop of Grand Rapids; 1989–2003	Succeeded by Kevin Michael Britt
Preceded by Edmund Szoka	Bishop of Gaylord; 1981–1989	Succeeded by Patrick R. Cooney
