= Steven J. Raica =

American Catholic prelate (born 1952)

His Excellency, The Most Reverend Steven J. Raica
- Bishop of Birmingham
- Church: Catholic Church
- Diocese: Birmingham
- Appointed: March 25, 2020
- Installed: June 23, 2020
- Predecessor: Robert Joseph Baker
- Previous post: Bishop of Gaylord (2014–2020)

Orders
- Ordination: October 14, 1978 by Kenneth Joseph Povish
- Consecration: August 28, 2014 by Allen Henry Vigneron, Carl Frederick Mengeling, and Bernard Hebda

Personal details
- Born: November 8, 1952 (age 74) Munising, Michigan, US
- Education: Michigan State University; St. John’s Provincial Seminary; University of Detroit; Pontifical Gregorian University
- Motto: Sursum corda (Latin for 'Lift up your hearts')
- Styles
- Reference style: His Excellency; The Most Reverend
- Spoken style: Your Excellency
- Religious style: Bishop

Steven John Raica (born November 8, 1952) is an American Catholic prelate serving as Bishop of Birmingham in Alabama since 2020. He previously served as Bishop of Gaylord from 2014 to 2020.

== Biography ==
=== Early life and education ===
Raica was born on November 8, 1952, in Munising, Michigan to Steve and Mary Raica. He earned a Bachelor of Arts degree from Michigan State University in East Lansing, Michigan, a Master of Divinity degree from St. John's Provincial Seminary in Plymouth, Michigan, and a Master of Religious Studies degree from the University of Detroit.

=== Ordination and ministry ===
Raica was ordained a priest at St. Mary Cathedral in Lansing for the Diocese of Lansing by Bishop Kenneth Povish on October 14, 1978. After his 1978 ordination, the diocese assigned Raica as parochial vicar at Holy Redeemer Parish in Burton, Michigan and St. Pius X Parish in Flint, Michigan.

In 1984, the diocese moved Raica to Holy Family Parish in Ovid, Michigan to serve as pastor. The next year, he left Holy Family to become co-rector of St. Mary Cathedral. In 1988, Raica traveled to Rome to attend the Pontifical Gregorian University, receiving a Licentiate in Canon Law and a Doctor of Canon law degree.

After his return to Michigan in 1991, the diocese named Raica as pastor of St. Mary Parish in Charlotte, Michigan, serving there until 1993. He became pastor of St. Ann Parish in Bellevue, Michigan in 1995. In 1997, Raica was appointed as chancellor of the diocese. Pope John Paul II named him an honorary prelate of his holiness, with the title of monsignor, in 1998.

Raica returned to Rome in 1999 to serve as the superior of Casa Santa Maria, the graduate studies house of the Pontifical North American College. At the same time, he was also spiritual director and adjunct faculty at the college. When Raica came back to Lansing in 2005, he resumed his role as chancellor.

Raica served the diocesan tribunal as a pro-synodal judge, the promoter of justice, and a tribunal judge. He was also involved in ministry to the deaf and is fluent in American Sign Language.

=== Bishop of Gaylord ===
Coat of arms as bishop of Gaylord

On June 27, 2014, Pope Francis appointed Raica as the fifth bishop of Gaylord. He was consecrated by Archbishop Allen Vigneron on August 28, 2014, in St. Mary, Our Lady of Mount Carmel Cathedral in Gaylord, Michigan. Bishop Emeritus Carl Mengeling and Coadjutor Archbishop Bernard Hebda were the principal co-consecrators.

In February 2017, Sylvestre Obwaka, a Nigerian priest from St. Ignatius Parish in Rogers City, Michigan, was arrested on sexual assault charges. Another priest had accused Obwaka of assaulting him when he was sleeping at Obwaka's residence after a night of drinking. Raica later spoke with Obwaka, who admitted sexual contact with the man. Obwaka was acquitted in July 2017.

=== Bishop of Birmingham ===
Francis named Raica as bishop of Birmingham on March 25, 2020. He was installed on June 23, 2020.

Raica can converse in Italian and Polish, and has a reading knowledge of Latin, French, Spanish and German.

== See also ==
- Catholic Church hierarchy
- Catholic Church in the United States
- Historical list of the Catholic bishops of the United States
- List of Catholic bishops of the United States
- Lists of patriarchs, archbishops, and bishops

Catholic Church titles
Preceded by Robert Joseph Baker	Bishop of Birmingham; 2020–present	Succeeded by Incumbent
Preceded by Bernard Hebda	Bishop of Gaylord; 2014–2020	Succeeded by Jeffrey Walsh
