= WBLW =

Coordinates: 45.170°N 84.751°W

- Gaylord, Michigan; United States
- Broadcast area: Gaylord-Petoskey
- Frequency: 88.1 MHz
- Branding: Living Word FM

Programming
- Format: Religious

Ownership
- Owner: Grace Baptist Church

History
- First air date: 2000
- Call sign meaning: We Broadcast Living Words

Technical information
- Licensing authority: FCC
- Class: C2
- ERP: 5,000 watts
- HAAT: 260 meters

Links
- Public license information: Public file; LMS
- Website: http://www.wblwradio.com/

WBLW (88.1 FM) is a radio station broadcasting a religious format. Licensed to Gaylord, Michigan, it first began broadcasting in 2000.

== Sources ==
- Michiguide.com - WBLW History
