= Joseph M. Breitenbeck =

American prelate (1914–2005)

His Excellency, The Most Reverend Joseph Matthew Breitenbeck
- Bishop of Grand Rapids; Titular Bishop of Tepelta
- Church: Roman Catholic Church
- See: Diocese of Grand Rapids
- In office: October 15, 1969 to June 24, 1989
- Predecessor: Allen James Babcock
- Successor: Robert John Rose
- Other posts: Auxiliary Bishop of Detroit; 1965 to 1969

Orders
- Ordination: May 30, 1942 by Edward Mooney
- Consecration: December 20, 1965 by John Dearden

Personal details
- Born: August 3, 1914 Detroit, Michigan, US
- Died: March 12, 2005 (aged 90) Grand Rapids, Michigan, US
- Buried: Resurrection Cemetery, Wyoming, US
- Education: University of Detroit; Sacred Heart Major Seminary; Pontifical Gregorian University; Catholic University of America
- Motto: Serving the Lord

Joseph Matthew Breitenbeck (August 3, 1914 – March 12, 2005) was an American prelate of the Roman Catholic Church. He was the eighth bishop of the Diocese of Grand Rapids in Michigan from 1969 to 1989, having previously served as an auxiliary bishop of the Archdiocese of Detroit in Michigan from 1965 to 1969.

== Biography ==
=== Early life ===
Joseph Breitenbeck was born on August 3, 1914 in Detroit, Michigan, one of seven children of Matthew Joseph and Mary Agnes (née Quinlan) Breitenbeck; the father lost his job during the Great Depression of the 1930s. Two of Joseph's brothers also entered the priesthood. After graduating from Holy Redeemer High School in Detroit, he began studying pre-law at the University of Detroit in 1932. However, he abandoned his ambitions for a legal career after a priest suggested he consider the priesthood.

In 1935, Breitenbeck enrolled at Sacred Heart Major Seminary in Detroit. He earned a Bachelor of Arts degree from Sacred Heart in 1938 and continued his studies in Rome, residing at the Pontifical North American College while studying at the Pontifical Gregorian University.Pope Pius XII closed the North American College in 1940 due to World War II, forcing Breitenbeck to return to the United States. He transferred to the Catholic University of America in Washington, D.C., where he earned a Licentiate of Sacred Theology in 1942.

== Priesthood ==
On May 30, 1942, Breitenbeck was ordained a priest for the Archdiocese of Detroit by Archbishop Edward Mooney at the Cathedral of the Most Blessed Sacrament in Detroit. His first assignment was as an assistant pastor at St. Margaret Mary Parish in Detroit, where he remained for five years. In 1947, after the end of the war, he returned to Rome to pursue his graduate studies and earned a Licentiate of Canon Law from the Pontifical Lateran University in 1949.

Upon his return to Detroit, Breitenbeck served as secretary to Mooney from 1949 to 1958. The Vatican elevate Breitenbeck to the rank of papal chamberlain in 1953 and domestic prelate in 1956. Following Mooney's death in 1958, he served as secretary to his successor, Archbishop John F. Dearden, for a year. Breitenbeck then served as pastor of Assumption Grotto Parish in Detroit from 1959 to 1967. He accompanied Dearden to the Second Vatican Council in Rome between 1962 and 1965.

=== Auxiliary Bishop of Detroit ===
On October 18, 1965, Breitenbeck was appointed auxiliary bishop of Detroit and titular bishop of Tepelta by Pope Paul VI. He received his episcopal consecration on December 20, 1965, from Archbishop Dearden, with Bishops John Anthony Donovan and Gerald Vincent McDevitt serving as co-consecrators, at the Cathedral of the Most Blessed Sacrament.

As an auxiliary bishop, he continued to serve as pastor of Assumption Grotto. In addition to his pastoral duties, he became vicar general of the archdiocese and delegate for religious in 1966.

=== Bishop of Grand Rapids ===
On October 15, 1969, Breitenbeck was appointed the eighth bishop of Grand Rapids. His installation took place on December 2, 1969. During his tenure in Grand Rapids, he distinguished himself as an advocate of progressive values, who vigorously implemented the reforms of the Second Vatican Council. In 1971 he expressed his support for the ordination of women and for ending clerical celibacy in order to address the priest shortage. He also encouraged the practice of communal confessions, and allowed divorced and remarried Catholics to receive the sacraments. Some parishes strongly resisted changing the language of the mass from Latin to English; St. Isidore's Church even took Breitenbeck and the diocese to court over the issue. He also spoke out against nuclear warfare and in favor of a fair wage.

In his 19 years as bishop, Breitenbeck oversaw the establishment of seven new parishes as well as the erection of the Dioceses of Gaylord and Kalamazoo from the Diocese of Grand Rapids. In the 1980s, he created policies and procedures for handling allegations of clerical sexual abuse; these rules remained in force until major revisions in the early 21st century. Having a sister with developmental disabilities led him to establish a ministry to help people with disabilities. He also helped establish the Deposit & Loan Cooperative Investment Program, which allowed parishes to borrow money from diocesan funds at a lower interest rate, and supported the Michigan Catholic Conference's efforts to provide retirement benefits for priests and laity. He instituted regular changes and appointments of pastors and oversaw one of the renovations of the Cathedral of St. Andrew.

Instead of living at the episcopal residence, Breitenbeck sold it and moved into a modest home in Grattan Township, Michigan. As a member of the United States Conference of Catholic Bishops, he served as chair of the Liaison Committee for Major Superiors of Women, member of the Committee for Latin America, and member of the Committee for Canonical Affairs. He also served as episcopal advisor for the National Catholic Laymen's Retreat Conference, treasurer of the Michigan Catholic Conference, and member of the board of directors of the American College at Louvain. Outside of ecclesiastical activities, he was active in the Old Newsboys, the Rotary Club, the United Way, the Urban League, and the Economic Club.

=== Retirement and legacy ===
Shortly before reaching the mandatory retirement age of 75, Breitenbeck resigned as bishop of Grand Rapids on June 24, 1989. Serving for nearly 20 years, he was the second-longest serving bishop in the history of the diocese.

In 2002, having long-suffered from severe and chronic back pain, he moved to St. Ann's Home in Grand Rapids. He died there on March 12, 2005, at age 90. He is buried at Resurrection Cemetery in Wyoming, Michigan.

== Episcopal succession ==
Catholic Church titles
Preceded by Allen James Babcock	Bishop of Grand Rapids; 1969–1989	Succeeded by Robert John Rose
