= Bernard Hebda =

American Catholic prelate (born 1959)

His Excellency, The Most Reverend Bernard Hebda JCL, JD
- Archbishop of Saint Paul and Minneapolis
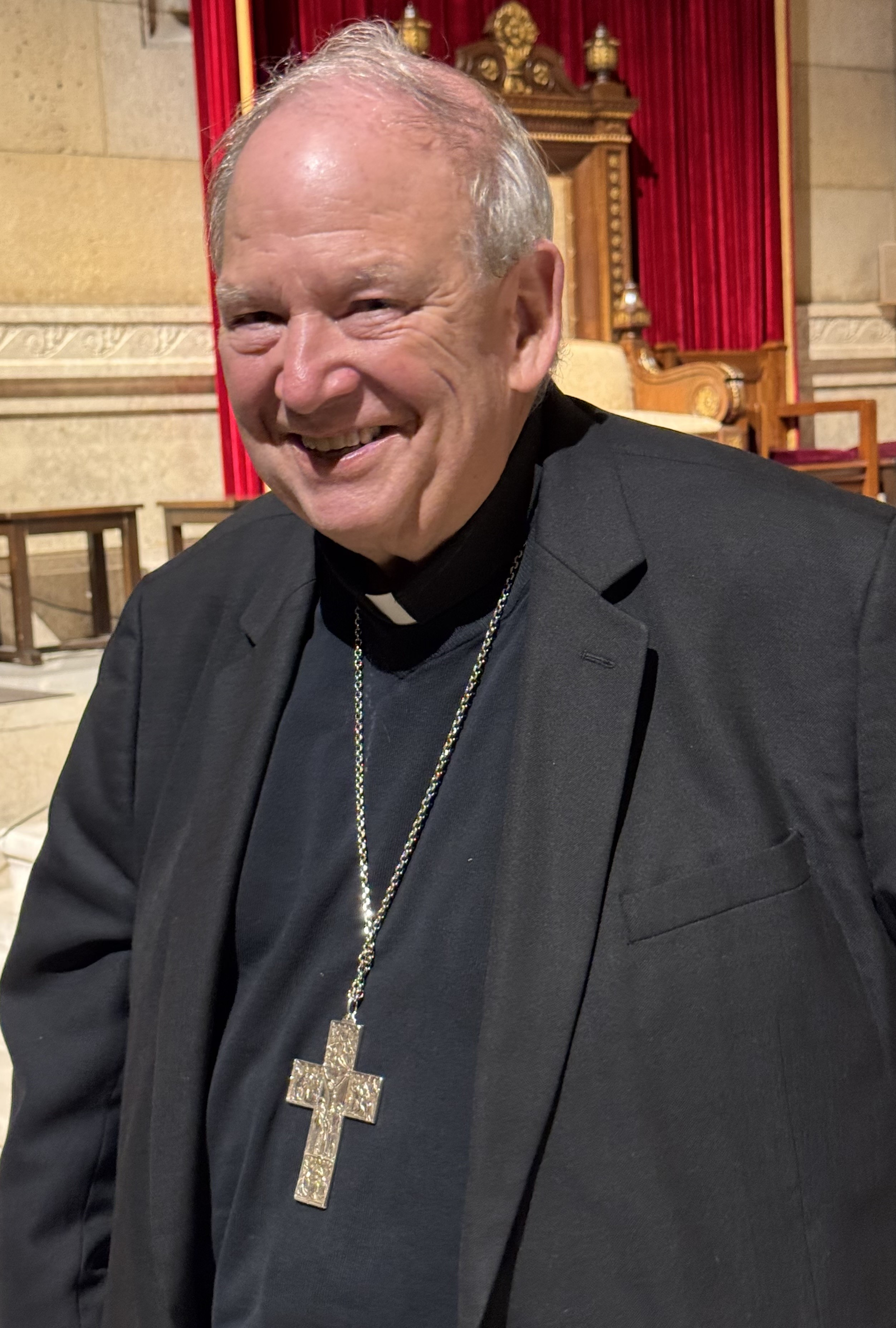
- Hebda in 2026
- Archdiocese: Saint Paul and Minneapolis
- Appointed: March 24, 2016
- Installed: May 13, 2016
- Predecessor: John Clayton Nienstedt
- Previous posts: Coadjutor Archbishop of Newark (2013–2016); Bishop of Gaylord (2009–2013); Under Secretary, Pontifical Council for Legislative Texts (2003–2009)

Orders
- Ordination: July 1, 1989 by Donald Wuerl
- Consecration: December 1, 2009 by Allen Henry Vigneron, Francesco Coccopalmerio, and Patrick R. Cooney

Personal details
- Born: September 3, 1959 (age 67) Pittsburgh, Pennsylvania, US
- Education: Harvard University; Columbia University; Pontifical Gregorian University
- Motto: "Only Jesus." (Mark 9:8)
- Styles
- Or, an elderberry tree fructed, all proper, issuant from a fess chequy Azure and Argent and surmounted by a seven-pointed star of the second.
- Reference style: His Excellency; The Most Reverend
- Spoken style: Your Excellency
- Religious style: Archbishop

Bernard Anthony Hebda (born September 3, 1959) is an American Catholic prelate serving as Archbishop of Saint Paul and Minneapolis in Minnesota since 2016.

He previously served as apostolic administrator of the archdiocese beginning in 2015, and as coadjutor archbishop of the Archdiocese of Newark in New Jersey from 2013 to 2015, as bishop of Gaylord in Michigan from 2009 to 2013, and in the Roman Curia on the Pontifical Council for Legislative Texts from 2003 to 2009.

== Biography ==
=== Early life ===
Hebda was born in Pittsburgh, Pennsylvania, on September 3, 1959, in the community of Brookline. He attended South Hills Catholic High School in Mt. Lebanon, Pennsylvania. He then entered Harvard University, where he was on the staff of the Harvard International Review, and earned a Bachelor of Political Science degree in 1980. Hebda received a JD from Columbia Law School at the Parker School of Foreign and Comparative Law in New York City in 1983.

Hebda studied philosophy at Saint Paul Seminary in Pittsburgh from 1984 to 1985. He lived at the Pontifical North American College in Rome and attended the Pontifical Gregorian University, where he earned a Bachelor of Sacred Theology degree (1985–1988) and a licentiate in Canon Law (1988–1990).

=== Priesthood ===
On July 1, 1989, Hebda was ordained by Bishop Donald Wuerl as a priest for the Diocese of Pittsburgh at Saint Paul Cathedral in Pittsburgh The diocese then assigned him to the following positions:

- Assistant priest at Purification of the Blessed Virgin Mary Parish in Ellwood City, Pennsylvania (1989)
- Personal secretary to Wuerl and master of ceremonies (1990 to 1992)
- Pastor in solidum at Prince of Peace Parish in Pittsburgh (1992 to 1995)
- Judge of the diocesan tribunal (1992 to 1996)
- Director of the Newman Center at Slippery Rock University in Slippery Rock, Pennsylvania (1995 to 1996)

In 1996, Hebda went to Rome to work at the Pontifical Council for Legislative Texts. In, 2000, he was named a monsignor by the Vatican. From 2003, he served as under-secretary of the Pontifical Council.

In Rome, Hebda also served as an adjunct spiritual director at the North American College and confessor to the Missionaries of Charity. He lived at the Villa Stritch, a residence for American priests working for the Vatican. In 2009, following the announcement of Hebda's appointment as a bishop, the college community presented him with a pectoral cross and crosier.

=== Bishop of Gaylord ===
On October 7, 2009, Pope Benedict XVI named Hebda the fourth bishop of Gaylord. Hebda was consecrated and installed on December 1, 2009, at Saint Mary, Our Lady of Mount Carmel Cathedral in Gaylord, Michigan. In November 2013, Hebda was elected to chair the Committee on Canonical Affairs and Church Governance of the United States Conference of Catholic Bishops (USCCB).

=== Coadjutor Archbishop of Newark ===
Hebda was appointed as coadjutor archbishop of Newark on September 24, 2013. Archbishop John Myers had asked for the appointment of a coadjutor to assist him as he approached retirement age. Hebda chose a dormitory at Seton Hall University in South Orange, New Jersey, as his residence. He defended Myers against complaints he had spent an extravagant amount on living quarters for his retirement, noting that Myers had lived in shared quarters at the cathedral rectory in Newark for thirteen years.

==== Apostolic administrator of Saint Paul and Minneapolis ====
On June 15, 2015, Pope Francis accepted the resignations of Archbishop John Nienstedt and Auxiliary Bishop Lee A. Piché of the Archdiocese of Saint Paul and Minneapolis. The same day, Francis appointed Hebda as its apostolic administrator to serve until a new archbishop would be installed, although Hebda remained as the coadjutor archbishop of Newark.

In September 2015, Hebda met with representatives of the Catholic Coalition for Church Reform. They discussed how the laity could participate in defining the needs of the archdiocese and what it expects from its next archbishop. Hebda state that he was

"...delighted to learn that they share my interest in engaging in a wide consultation of the faithful in assessing the needs of the archdiocese... I was also happy to share with them some of the preliminary plans for that consultation, and appreciated their input and offer of collaboration."

Hebda organized a series of public meetings – "listening sessions" – throughout the archdiocese to allow parishioners, clergy, and employees to express their views on the appointment of a new archbishop. During Hebda's term as administrator, the archdiocese agreed on a civil settlement with Ramsey County on procedures to prevent child sexual abuse. It provided for judicial oversight for three years. The civil case was settled in December 2015 under a plan that allowed for more oversight of the church. Attorneys for both sides used the hearing process in the civil case to announce new steps aimed at reinforcing that agreement. In court papers in Ramsey County Court, the archdiocese stated

"The Archdiocese admits that it failed to adequately respond and prevent the sexual abuse... The Archdiocese failed to keep the safety and wellbeing of these three children ahead of protecting the interests of Curtis Wehmeyer and the Archdiocese. The actions and omissions of the Archdiocese failed to prevent the abuse that resulted in the need for protection and services for these three children."

In a letter, Hebda wrote: "We are agreeing to implement the plan under a set deadline and to be held accountable for that commitment." He called the settlement "the most public indicator that this archdiocese has earnestly embarked on a journey of self-reflection, evaluation and action". In his time as administrator, less than a year, he handled a number of cases of priests accused of sexual abuse of minors, both removing and reinstating them.

=== Archbishop of Saint Paul and Minneapolis ===
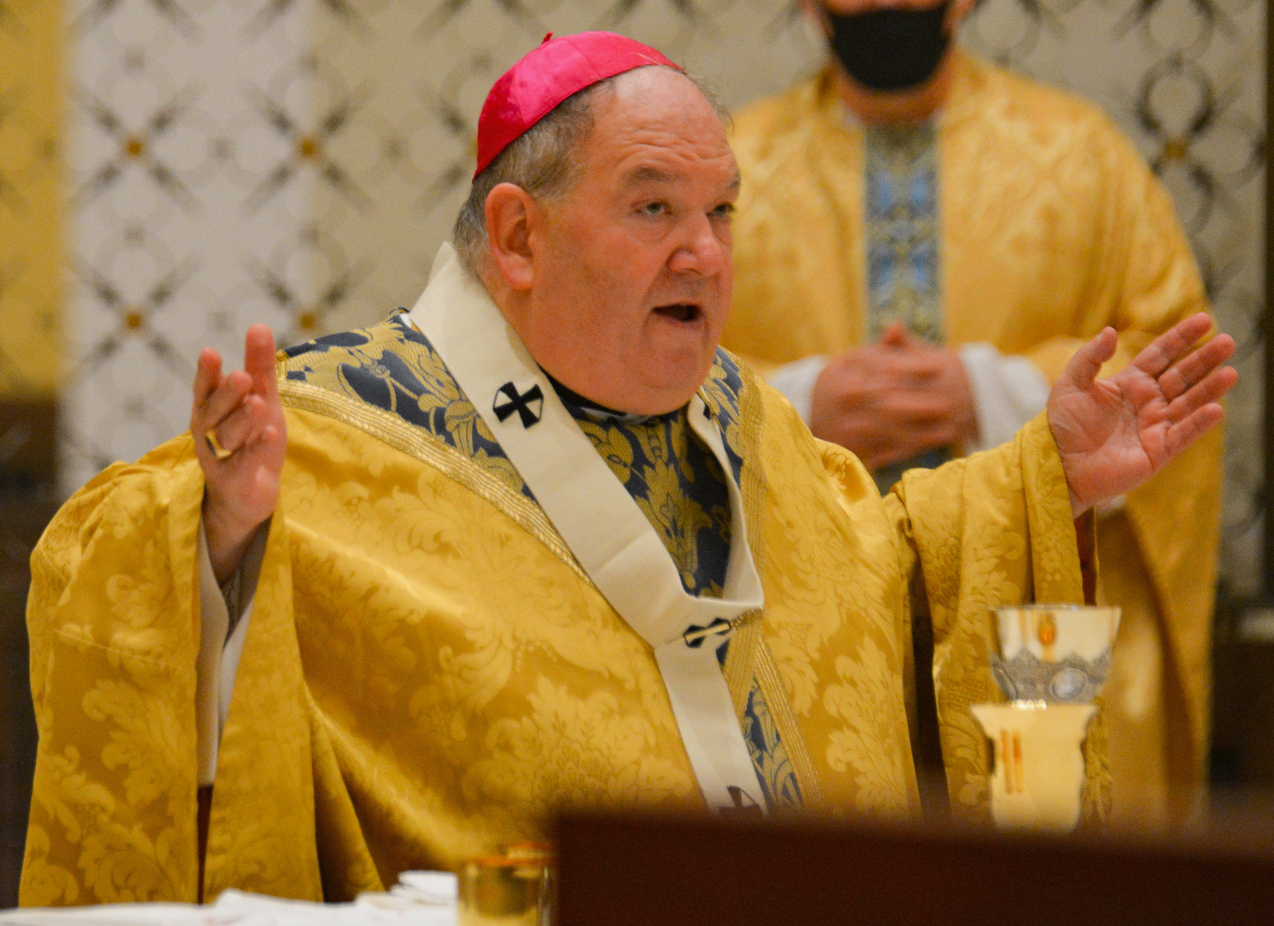
Archbishop Hebda in 2021

On March 24, 2016, Francis named Hebda as archbishop of Saint Paul and Minneapolis. He was installed in the Cathedral of Saint Paul in St. Paul, Minnesota, on May 13, 2016.

A major defining aspect of Hebda's tenure in the archdiocese was the continuing legal processes surrounding the fallout of the sexual abuse crisis in the archdiocese. Before his arrival, in January 2015, the archdiocese had filed for Chapter 11 bankruptcy. In September 2018, the archdiocese's bankruptcy-exit plan was approved by a federal judge; by the end of the year, the archbishop announced that it was officially out of bankruptcy.

In 2019, Hebda announced that he would be calling an archdiocesan synod. This would be the first synod held in the archdiocese in eight decades. It culminated in June 2022 with an archdiocesan synodal assembly. Hebda released a pastoral letter, "You Shall Be My Witnesses", on the feast of Christ the King in 2022.

== See also ==
- Catholic Church hierarchy
- Catholic Church in the United States
- Historical list of the Catholic bishops of the United States
- List of Catholic bishops of the United States
- Lists of patriarchs, archbishops, and bishops

Catholic Church titles
Preceded by Patrick R. Cooney	Bishop of Gaylord; 2009–2013	Succeeded by Steven J. Raica
Preceded by -	Coadjutor Archbishop of Newark; 2013–2016	Succeeded by -
Preceded by John Clayton Nienstedt	Archbishop of Saint Paul and Minneapolis; 2016–present	Incumbent
