= Jeffrey Walsh =

American Roman Catholic priest and bishop

His Excellency, The Most Reverend Jeffrey Joseph Walsh
- Bishop of Gaylord
- Diocese: Gaylord
- Appointed: December 21, 2021
- Installed: March 4, 2022
- Predecessor: Steven J. Raica

Orders
- Ordination: June 25, 1994 by James Timlin
- Consecration: March 4, 2022 by Allen Vigneron, Walter A. Hurley, and Joseph Bambera

Personal details
- Born: November 29, 1965 (age 60) Scranton, Pennsylvania, US
- Education: University of Scranton; Mount St. Mary's Seminary; Marywood University
- Motto: Divine providence

Styles of Jeffrey Joseph Walsh
- Reference style: His Excellency; The Most Reverend
- Spoken style: Your Excellency
- Religious style: Bishop

Jeffrey Joseph Walsh (born November 29, 1965) is an American prelate of the Catholic Church who has been serving as the sixth bishop of the Diocese of Gaylord in Michigan since 2022.

== Biography ==
=== Early life ===
Jeffrey Walsh was born on November 29, 1965, in Scranton, Pennsylvania, the son of Jerome and Nancy Walsh. He has two brothers. Walsh attended Scranton Central High School, then entered the University of Scranton. Walsh graduated from there in 1987 with a bachelor's degree in health and human resources.

In 1987, Walsh began his studies at Mount St. Mary's Seminary in Emmitsburg, Maryland, where he earned a Master of Divinity.

=== Priesthood ===
Walsh was ordained a priest for the Diocese of Scranton on June 25, 1995, by Bishop James Clifford Timlin at St. Peter's Cathedral in Scranton.

After his 1995 ordination, the diocese assigned Walsh as parochial vicar of Saint Rose of Lima Parish in Carbondale, Pennsylvania, and as director of religious education at Sacred Heart High School in Carbondale. The diocese transferred as parochial vicar to the Cathedral of Saint Peter Parish the next year.

In 1999, Walsh was named pastor of Our Lady of the Lake Parish in Lake Winola, Pennsylvania as well as director of education at St. Pius X Seminary in Dalton, Pennsylvania. Timlin named Walsh as director of vocations for the diocese in 2002. Two years later, Walsh left Our Lady to become pastor of the Nativity of the Blessed Virgin Mary Parish in Tunkhannock, Pennsylvania.

Timlin appointed Walsh as a regional episcopal vicar in 2006 and two years later he was named administrator of Saint Rita Parish in Gouldsboro, Pennsylvania. He moved the next year to become administrator of Saint Anthony Parish in Throop, Pennsylvania, and was selected as secretary for Catholic social services. Walsh was awarded a Master of Social Work from Marywood University in Scranton in 2010.

Walsh was moved again in 2010 to be pastor of Saint John's parish in East Stroudsburg, Pennsylvania. Bishop Joseph Martino named Walsh as vicar for the clergy in 2015. His final pastoral assignments before leaving the diocese was as pastor of both Saint Rose of Lima and Our Lady of Mt. Carmel Parishes in Carbondale, Pennsylvania. Walsh also served as a member of the college of consultors and the presbyteral council.

=== Bishop of Gaylord ===
Pope Francis appointed Walsh as bishop of Gaylord on December 21, 2021. Walsh's episcopal ordination and installation as bishop took place on March 4, 2022, at St. Mary Cathedral in Gaylord, Michigan.

On January 22, 2024, Walsh suspended two retired diocesan priests from ministry. The two clerics had been named as having credible accusations of sexual abuse in a January 8, 2024. report released by Michigan Attorney General Dana Nessel.

== See also ==
- Catholic Church hierarchy
- Catholic Church in the United States
- Historical list of the Catholic bishops of the United States
- List of Catholic bishops of the United States
- Lists of patriarchs, archbishops, and bishops

== Episcopal succession ==
Catholic Church titles
| Preceded by Steven J. Raica | Bishop of Gaylord; 2022-Present | Succeeded by Incumbent |
