= Francis J. Haas =

American prelate (1889–1953)

His Excellency, The Most Reverend Francis Joseph Haas
- Bishop of Grand Rapids
- Hass holding news conference as chair of Fair Employment Practices Commission, 1942.
- Church: Roman Catholic Church
- See: Diocese of Grand Rapids
- In office: November 18, 1943 - August 29, 1953
- Predecessor: Joseph C. Plagens
- Successor: Allen James Babcock
- Other posts: Mediator, National Labor Board; Chair, President's Committee on Fair Employment Practice

Orders
- Ordination: June 11, 1913 by Joseph Maria Koudelka
- Consecration: November 18, 1943 by Amleto Cicognani

Personal details
- Born: March 18, 1889 Racine, Wisconsin, US
- Died: August 29, 1953 (aged 64) Grand Rapids, Michigan, US
- Buried: Resurrection Cemetery, Wyoming, Michigan, US
- Education: St. Francis Seminary; Johns Hopkins University; Catholic University of America
- Motto: In Christo justitia (Justice in Christ)

Francis Joseph Haas (March 18, 1889 – August 29, 1953) was an American prelate of the Roman Catholic Church. He served as the sixth bishop of the Diocese of Grand Rapids in Michigan from 1943 until his death in 1953.

An advocate for organized labor, Haas served as a U.S. Government labor mediator for major labor strikes before being appointed bishop.

== Biography ==
=== Early life ===
Francis Haas was born on March 18, 1889, in Racine, Wisconsin, to Peter Francis Haas and Mary Lucy O'Day. In 1904, he entered St. Francis Seminary in St. Francis, Wisconsin.

=== Priesthood ===
Haas was ordained on June 11, 1913, for the Archdiocese of Milwaukee by Bishop Joseph Maria Koudelka in Racine. After his ordination, Haas was assigned as an assistant pastor at Holy Rosary Parish in Milwaukee. He also became a faculty member two years later at St. Francis Seminary.

In 1919, Haas entered the Catholic University of America in Washington, D.C., obtaining a Doctor of Philosophy degree in 1922 with a thesis on "“Mediation in the Men’s Garment Industry.” Haas also attended Johns Hopkins University in Baltimore, Maryland. After returning to Milwaukee in 1922, he started teaching economics at both St. Francis Seminary and Marquette University. Haas also served as a member of the civil service examining board for Milwaukee County.

Haas returned to Washington in 1931 to become director of the National Catholic School of Social Service (NCSSS) at Catholic University. He was also named by US President Franklin Roosevelt in 1933 to the new National Labor Board in Washington. On July 18, 1934, Haas travelled to Minneapolis, Minnesota to mediate a work stoppage by delivery truck drivers who belonged to the Teamsters Union. With the onset of World War II, Haas reportedly participated in the mediation of 1,500 labor disputes.

Leaving Washington in 1935, Haas was appointed rector of St. Francis Seminary in Wisconsin. He received a Doctor of Law degree in 1936 from the University of Wisconsin. Haas also served as president of the Catholic Association for International Peace.

=== Bishop of Grand Rapids ===
In 1943, Hass resigned as chair of the President's Committee on Fair Employment Practice to become the bishop of Grand Rapids. Pope Pius XII appointed him bishop on September 26, 1943, and he was consecrated at the Cathedral of Saint Andrew in Grand Rapids, Michigan, by Archbishop Amleto Cicognani on November 18, 1943.

He was a member of US President Harry Truman's President's Committee on Civil Rights from 1946 to 1947. In 1951, Haas published the book Man and Society. It became a common college textbook for sociology classes. He hosted a National Liturgical Conference at the Grand Rapids Civic Auditorium in 1953

=== Death and legacy ===
Francis Hass died in Grand Rapids on August 29, 1953, of a heart attack. The Bishop Haas Council 4362 of the Knights of Columbus in Wyoming, Michigan was named in his honor.

== Awards ==
- Award for fighting intolerance from the Jewish Workmen's Circle of Detroit - 1950
- Human rights award from the Michigan Congress of Industrial Organizations Council - 1952

Catholic Church titles
Preceded by Joseph C. Plagens	Bishop of Grand Rapids; 1943–1953	Succeeded by Allen James Babcock
