= Diocese of Gaylord =

Latin Catholic jurisdiction in the US

Coordinates: 45°02′01″N 84°41′02″W

Diocese of Gaylord Diœcesis Gaylordensis
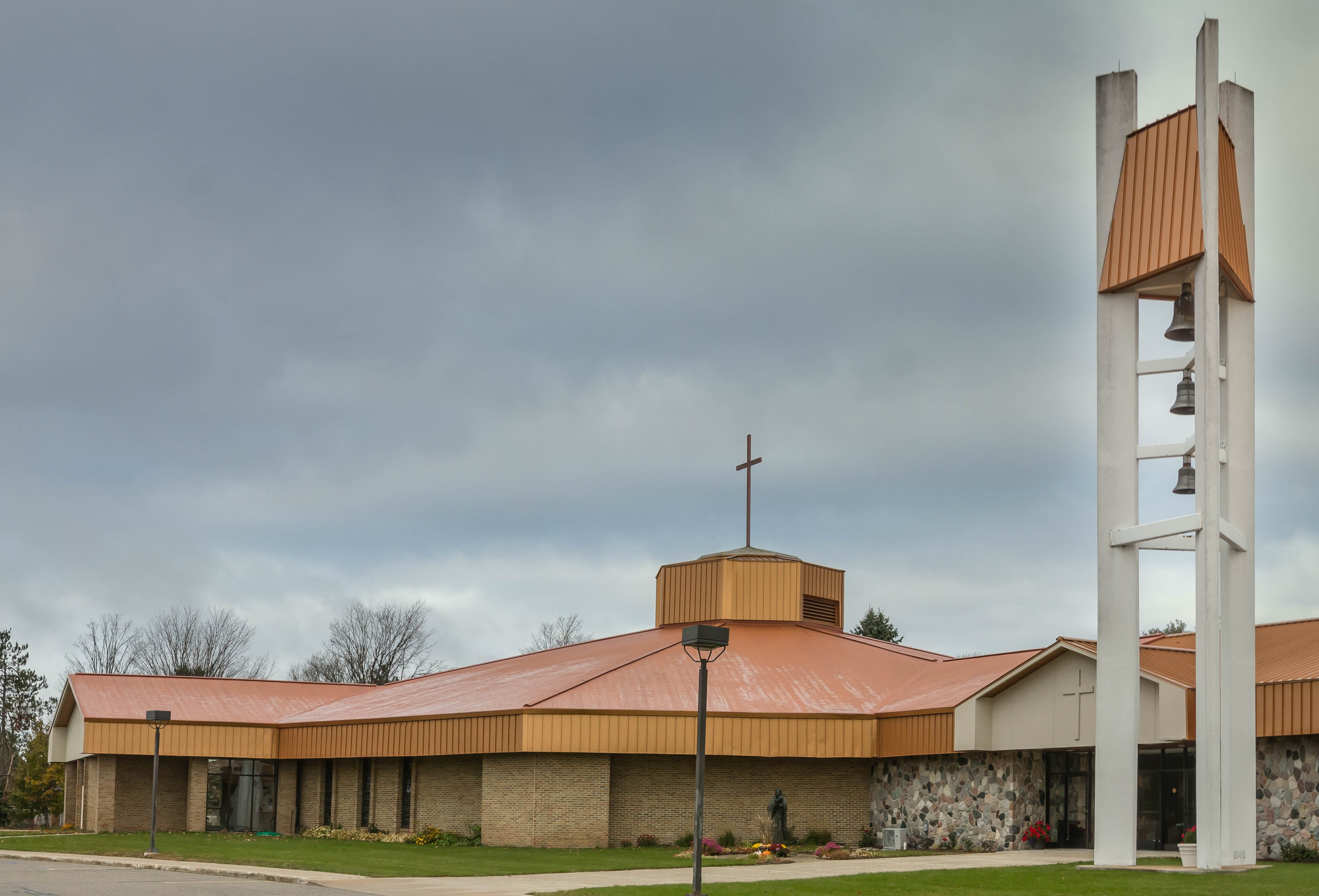
- St. Mary, Our Lady of Mount Carmel Cathedral

- Coat of arms

Location
- Country: United States
- Territory: Counties of Charlevoix, Emmet, Cheboygan, Presque Isle, Leelanau, Antrim, Otsego, Montmorency, Alpena, Benzie, Grand Traverse, Kalkaska, Crawford, Oscoda, Alcona, Manistee, Wexford, Missaukee, Roscommon, Ogemaw, and Iosco
- Ecclesiastical province: Detroit

Statistics
- Area: 11,171 sq mi (28,930 km^{2})
- Population: Total; Catholics: (as of 2018); 506,623; 46,095 (9.1%)
- Parishes: 75
- Schools: 17

Information
- Denomination: Catholic
- Sui iuris church: Latin Church
- Rite: Roman Rite
- Established: December 19, 1970 (55 years ago)
- Cathedral: St. Mary, Our Lady of Mount Carmel Cathedral
- Patron saint: Our Lady of Mount Carmel
- Secular priests: 76

Current leadership
- Pope: Leo XIV
- Bishop: Jeffrey Walsh
- Metropolitan Archbishop: Edward Weisenburger

Map
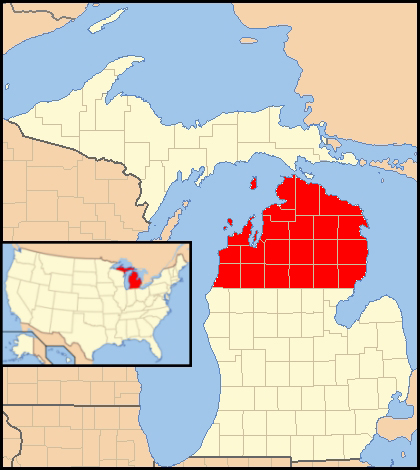

Website
- dioceseofgaylord.org

The Diocese of Gaylord (Latin: Diœcesis Gaylordensis) is a diocese of the Catholic Church in the northern region of Michigan in the United States. The diocese is a suffragan diocese in the ecclesiastical province of the metropolitan Archdiocese of Detroit.

== Territory ==
The Diocese of Gaylord covers approximately 11,171 square miles (28,930 km^{2}). It comprises the 21 most northern counties of the lower peninsula of the state, and includes the cities of Gaylord, Traverse City, Alpena, Manistee and Petoskey.

As of 2026, the diocese had a Catholic population of 43,754, served by 35 active diocesan priests and 21 extern priests in 75 parishes.

== History ==
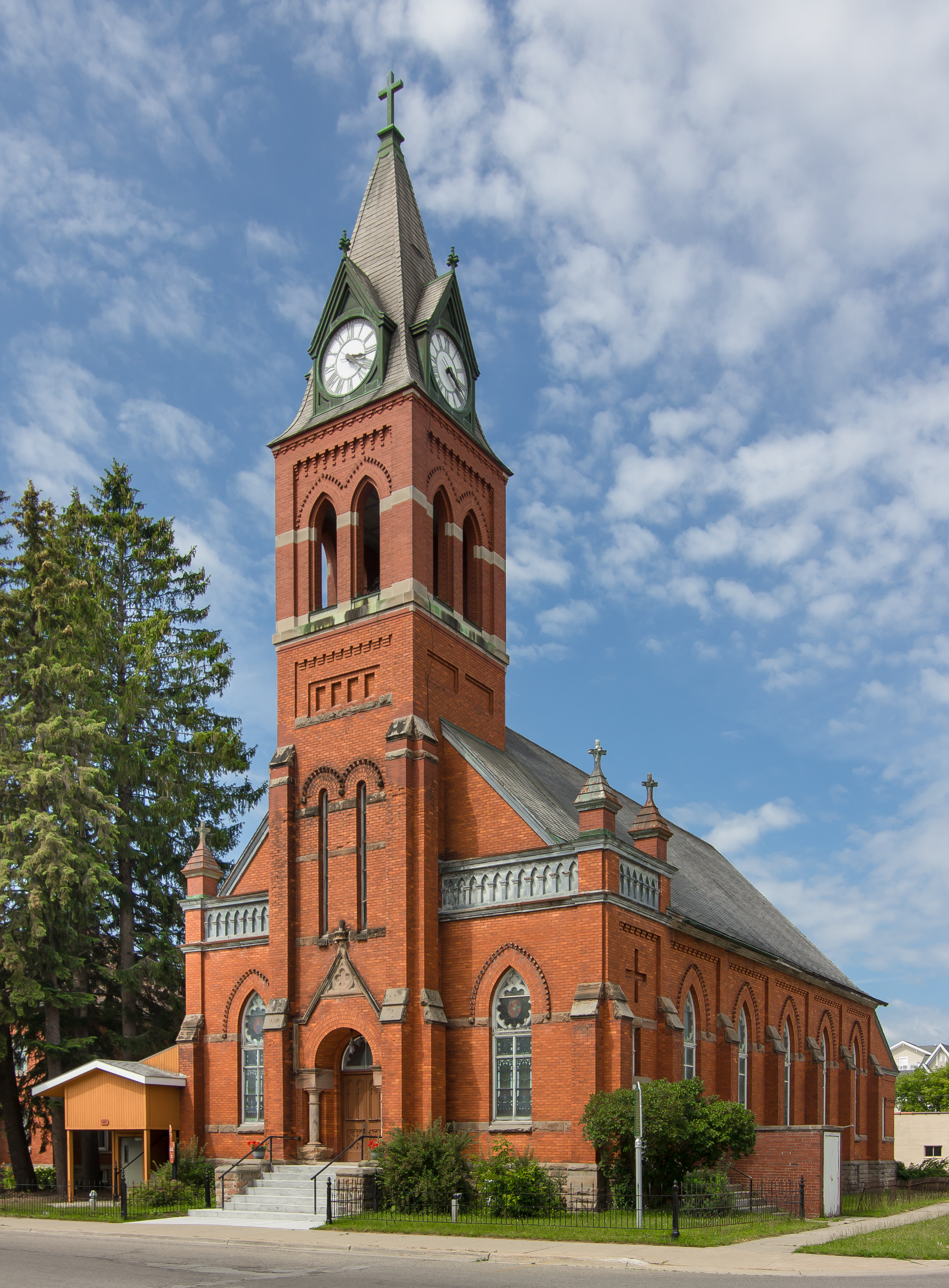
St. Mary's Church, the first cathedral in the diocese (2017)

=== 1700 to 1900 ===
During the 18th century, present-day Michigan was part of the French colony of New France. The Diocese of Quebec had jurisdiction over the region. In 1763, after the end of the French and Indian War, the Michigan area became part of the British Province of Quebec, forbidden from settlement by American colonists. After the American Revolution ended in 1883, the Michigan region became part of the new United States. For Catholics, Michigan was now under the jurisdiction of the Archdiocese of Baltimore, which then comprised the entire country.

In 1829, at the request of the Odawa tribe, Catholic missionairies established the Holy Childhood Indian Boarding School, along with a chapel, near present-day Harbor Springs. The school closed in 1839 due to lack of funding.Pope Gregory XVI formed the Diocese of Detroit in 1833, covering the entire Michigan Territory.Alpena received it first parish in 1864 with the founding of St. Bernard's.The first parish in Traverse City was St. Francis, founded in 1870.

In 1881, St. Mary, Our Lady of Mount Carmel Parish was founded, the first parish in Gaylord. Pope Leo XIII erected the Diocese of Grand Rapids in 1882. In 1884, the Franciscan Fathers of Sacred Heart of St. Louis reopened the Holy Childhood School. They brought in the School of Sisters of Notre Dame to take it over in 1886.Pope Pius XI formed the Diocese of Saginaw in 1938.

=== 1900 to 2000 ===
In 1906, Mercy Hospital opened in Cadillac, Michigan. Now it is Munson Healthcare Cadillac Hospital. St. Joseph Hospital was opened in Tawas City in 1953.Today it is MyMichigan Medical Center Tawas.

The Diocese of Gaylord was erected on July 20, 1971, from territory separated from the Dioceses of Saginaw and Grand Rapids. Edmund Szoka of the Diocese of Marquette was the first bishop, appointed by Pope Paul VI. The church of St. Mary, Our Lady of Mount Carmel Cathedral became the cathedral. Szoka was named archbishop of Detroit in 1981.

In 1981, Pope John Paul II appointed Robert John Rose of Grand Rapids as the second bishop of the Diocese of Gaylord. In 1989, Rose was named bishop of Grand Rapids.John Paul II named Auxiliary Bishop Patrick R. Cooney of Detroit to replace him later that year.

=== 2000 to present ===
Cooney died in 2012.In 2009, Pope Benedict XVI named Bernard Hebda from the Diocese of Pittsburgh as the fourth bishop of the Diocese of Gaylord. Hebda served in Gaylord until 2013, when he was appointed as coadjutor bishop of the Archdiocese of Newark by Pope Francis. The pope in 2014 named Steven J. Raica from the Diocese of Lansing as the next bishop of Gaylord. In 2020, Raica transferred to the Diocese of Birmingham in Alabama.

The diocese in 2021 apologized to Native Americans who had attended the Holy Childhood School.

The diocese is aware of painful accounts including the disturbance of unmarked graves in the early years (1890s) during construction of the city street, as well as more recent personal accounts and allegations of misconduct brought forward by former students and their families.

Jeffrey Walsh from the Diocese of Scranton was appointed bishop of Gaylord by Francis in 2022.Fred Szczepanski, music director of St. Francis Parish in Lewiston for 30 years, was fired in October 2024 for entering a same sex marriage. He sued the church and the diocese in January 2025, but the court ruled against Szczepanski, stating that the law on employment discrimination did not apply to religious organizations.

In January 2026, the diocese announced the closing of two parishes and the creation of 18 new parish clusters.

=== Sexual abuse ===
In 2002, Bishop Cooney allowed Gerald Shirilla to serve as pastor of a church with a school. This was despite his being removed from ministry in the Archdiocese of Detroit in 1993 following decades-long allegations of sexual abuse. After the Detroit Free Press reported on Shirilla in 2003, Cooney said that he had made "some errors in judgment" but was "no threat to the well-being of our children." Two weeks later, Cooney reversed himself and suspended Shirilla from ministry.

Walsh in February 2024 removed two diocesan priests from public ministry. During the 1990's, Raymond Cotter had consensual intercourse with a woman that resulted in a pregnancy. James Gardiner had allegedly touched a woman's thigh during a conference and sent inappropriate text messages to another woman.

=== Patron saint ===
On June 15, 2026, Bishop Jeffrey Walsh petitioned Pope Leo XIV to approve the patronage of Our Lady of Mount Carmel over the diocese. Consequently, the Dicastery for Divine Worship and the Discipline of the Sacraments issued the official decree, dated July 16, 2026, recognizing the above Marian title as the "Heavenly Patroness of the Diocese of Gaylord."

== Bishops ==
=== Bishops of Gaylord ===
1. Edmund Casimir Szoka (1971–1981), appointed Archbishop of Detroit and later President of the Prefecture for the Economic Affairs of the Holy See and President of the Pontifical Commission for Vatican City State and Governorate of Vatican City State (elevated to Cardinal in 1988)
2. Robert John Rose (1981–1989), appointed Bishop of Grand Rapids
3. Patrick R. Cooney (1989–2009)
4. Bernard Hebda (2009–2013), appointed Coadjutor Archbishop of Newark and later Archbishop of Saint Paul and Minneapolis
5. Steven J. Raica (2014 – March 25, 2020), appointed Bishop of Birmingham
6. Jeffrey Walsh (2022–Present)

=== Other priest of this diocese who became bishop ===
- Chad Zielinski, appointed Bishop of Fairbanks in 2014

== Education ==
As of 2026, the Diocese of Gaylord had three high schools with an enrollment of 474 students. In its 16 elementary schools, 2,676 students were enrolled. St. Michael High School is an independent Chesterton Academy school.

=== High schools ===
- St. Francis High School – Traverse City
- St. Mary Cathedral High School – Gaylord
- St. Mary High School – Lake Leelanau
- St. Michael High School – Petoskey

Coat of arms of Diocese of Gaylord
Notes Arms was designed and adopted when the diocese was erected Adopted 1970 Escutcheon The diocesan arms consists of the "argent" wavy bordure. The two "argent" six-point stars with a "chevronel" (a reduced-in-width form of the "chevron", one of the most ancient heraldic pieces) surmounting the "or" (golden) Cross. Symbolism The "argent" wavy bordure recalls that the diocese is nearly surrounded Lake Michigan and Lake Huron, and the Straits of Mackinac. The two "argent" six-point stars are reminiscent of the stars that appear on the crest of the Carmelite Order, recalling that the Church of Gaylord is under the patronage of Our Lady of Mount Carmel. The two stars also represent the Dioceses of Grand Rapids and Saginaw which yielded territories to establish the Gaylord diocese in 1971. The "chevronel" (a reduced-in-width form of the "chevron", one of the most ancient heraldic pieces) surmounting the "or" (golden) Cross, was chosen to symbolize the new presence of the Church of Our Lord in the City of Gaylord, the city highest in elevation in Michigan's lower peninsula; indeed, the "chevron," whose shape recalls the truss of a roof, has been adopted in heraldry since the time of the Middle Ages to symbolize the building where the population assembles; for Catholics this building is the Church.
