= St. Catherine of Siena Roman Catholic Church =

Historic church in Michigan, United States

- U.S. National Register of Historic Places
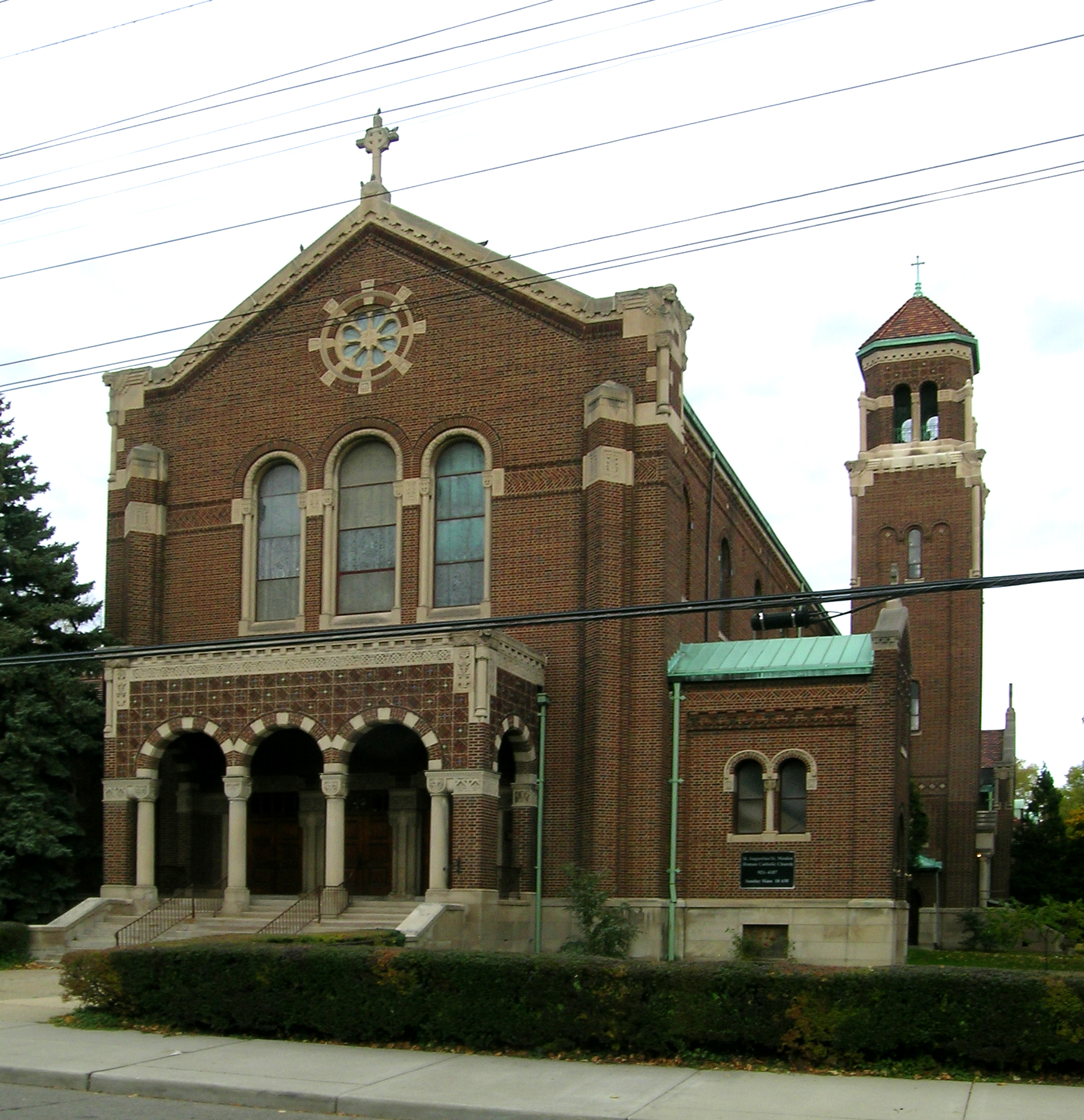
- Interactive map
- Location: 4151 Seminole Street; Detroit, Michigan
- Coordinates: 42°22′17″N 83°0′23″W
- Built: 1929
- Architect: Donaldson and Meier
- Architectural style: Romanesque Revival
- NRHP reference No.: 91000389
- Added to NRHP: April 05, 1991

The St. Catherine of Siena Roman Catholic Church is a church located at 4151 Seminole Street in Detroit, Michigan. It is now the St. Augustine and St. Monica Roman Catholic Church. The church was listed on the National Register of Historic Places in 1991.

== Description ==
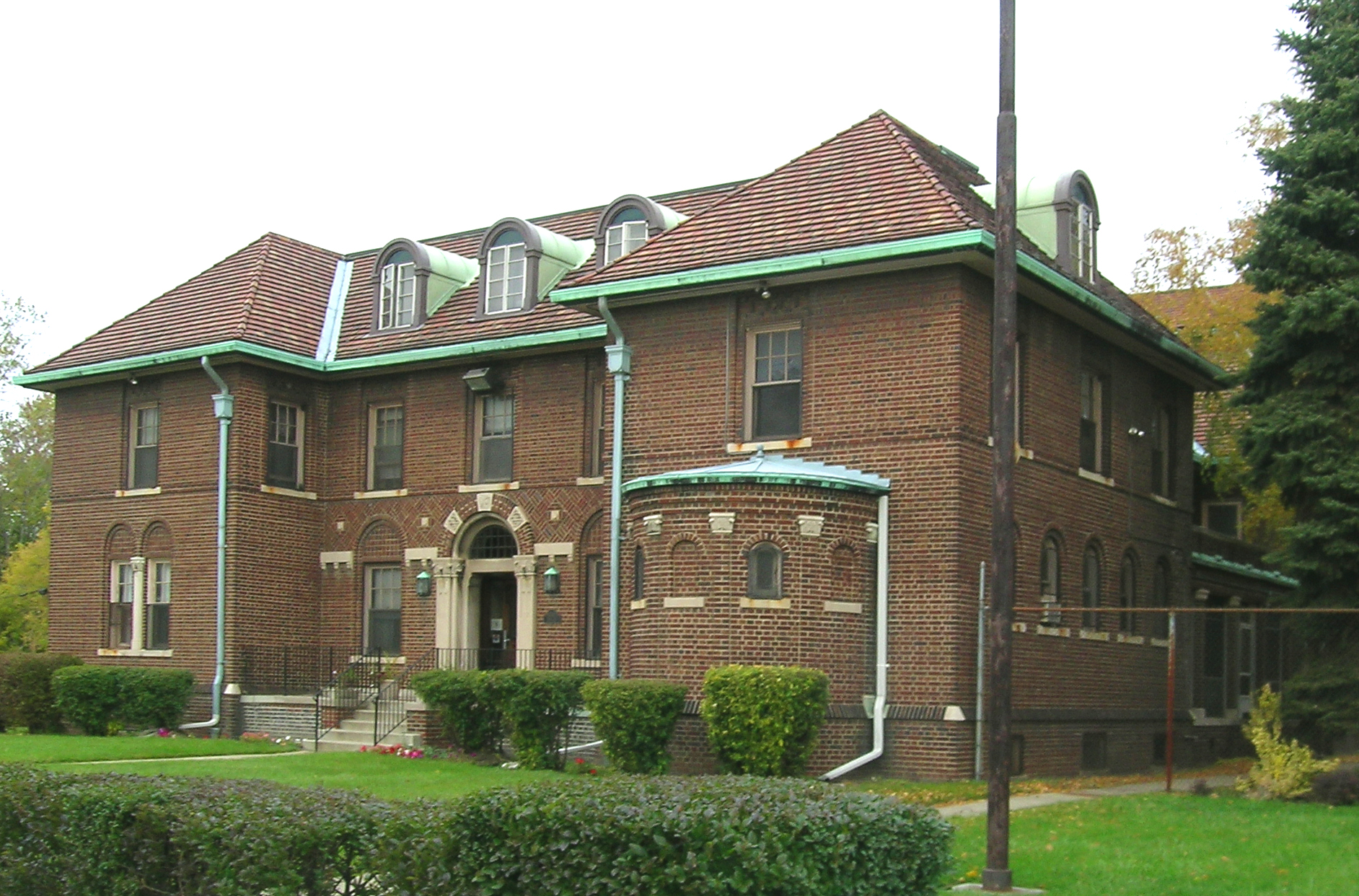
St. Catherine of Siena Roman Catholic Rectory

The St. Catherine of Siena Parish complex consists of four buildings: the parish school (1913), convent (1926), rectory (1926), and the church itself (1929). All buildings are basically Romanesque in style, with some Byzantine elements.

The church is the most visually catching structure. It is built in the form of a Latin cross, of mixed red and brown tapestry brick. The main façade has a gable form with a Romanesque arcaded portico containing the entrance and three tall windows above. A wheel window is placed in the pediment. Single-story wings with entrance doors flank the front, and a tower is located on the right side of the building.

== History ==
This collection of buildings is significant for its architectural quality. The first building of the parish, the school, was completed in 1913 by Donaldson and Meier at a cost of $52,000. The school building included a chapel and parish hall. The convent and rectory were both completed in 1926, and the church, costing $130,000, was completed in 1929.

Dwindling population in the latter part of the 20th century led to a merger of St. Catherine with the nearby St. Edward's Roman Catholic Church in 1970; the buildings of St. Edward's were demolished. In 1989, the St. Catherine parish was closed. A new parish, christened St. Augustine and St. Monica, was formed from the older St. Catherine/St. Edward's and the nearby St. Bernard's, and currently uses the buildings in the complex.
