= St. Mary, Our Lady of Mount Carmel Cathedral (Gaylord, Michigan) =

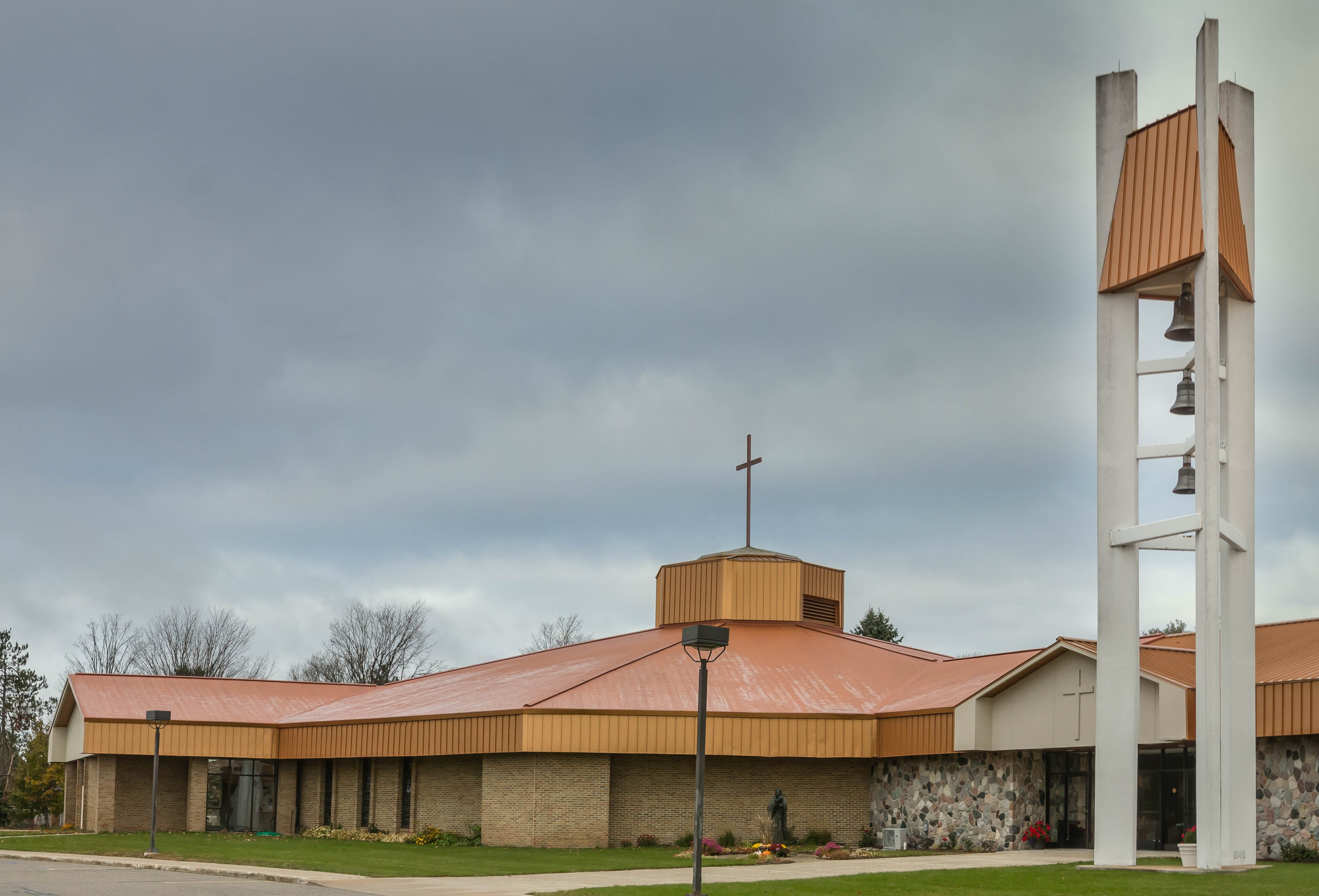
- St. Mary's Cathedral in 2018

- Location in Michigan St. Mary, Our Lady of Mount Carmel Cathedral (the United States)
- 45°02′01″N 84°40′59″W
- Location: 606 N. Ohio Ave. Gaylord, Michigan
- Country: United States
- Denomination: Roman Catholic Church
- Website: www.stmarycathedral.org

History
- Founded: 1884
- Dedication: Our Lady of Mount Carmel
- Consecrated: June 25, 1976

Architecture
- Heritage designation: Michigan State Historic Site (1901 church)
- Designated: 2005
- Style: Modern
- Completed: 1976

Specifications
- Capacity: 1,000
- Materials: Brick

Administration
- Diocese: Gaylord

Clergy
- Bishop: Most Rev. Jeffrey Walsh
- Rector: Rev. Matthew Wigton
- Vicar(s): Rev. John William

St. Mary, Our Lady of Mount Carmel Cathedral, also known simply as St. Mary Cathedral, is a Catholic cathedral and parish church located in Gaylord, Michigan, United States. It is the seat of the Diocese of Gaylord.

== History ==
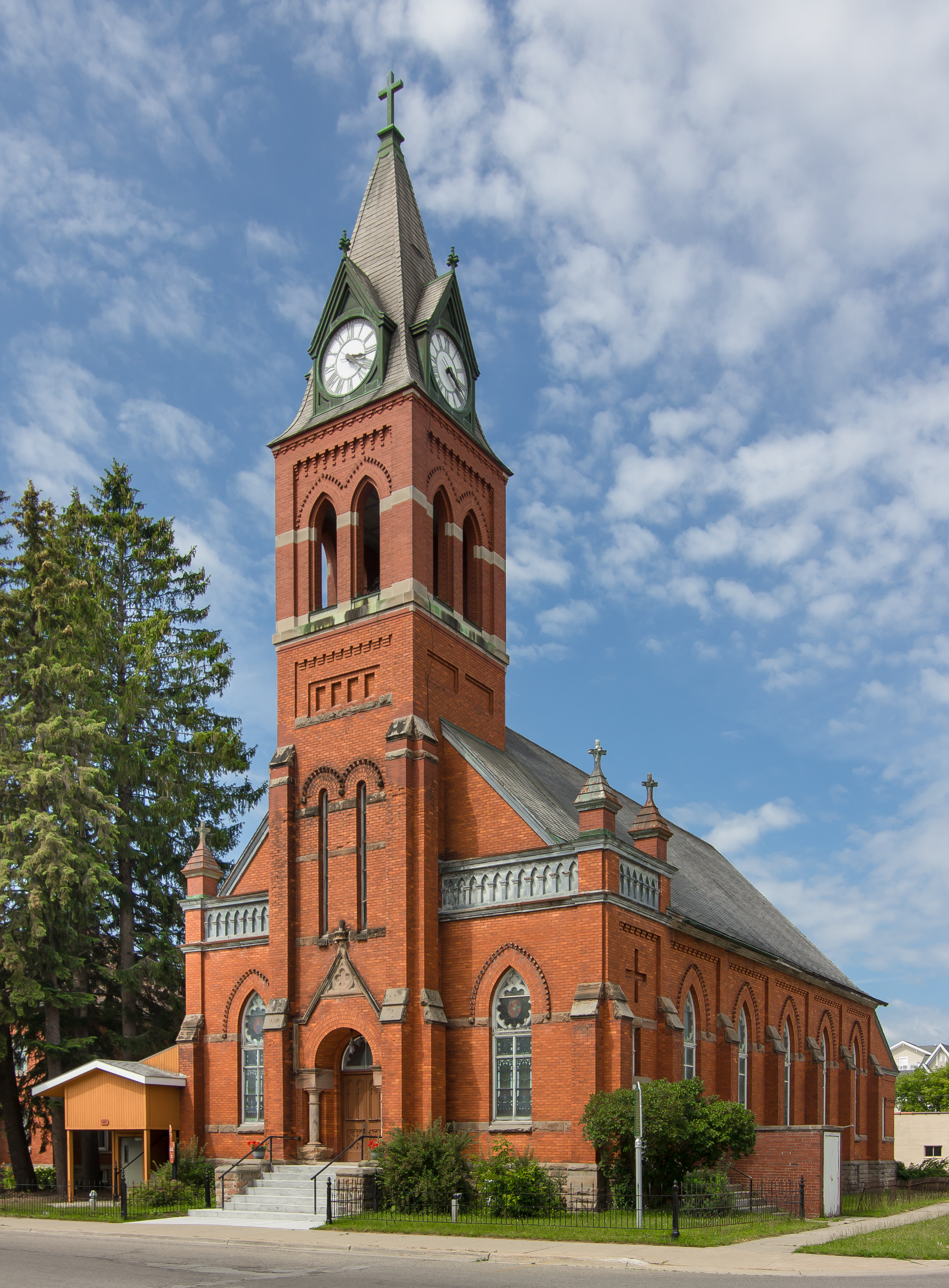
The original cathedral

The parish began as a mission in the Diocese of Grand Rapids. The first church was constructed in 1884, and with a predominantly Polish congregation, the parish began to grow. During the pastorate of the Rev. Casmir Skory, St. Mary's School was founded in 1893 with Dominican Sisters as teachers. Also during his pastorate a new church was built from 1900 to 1901 for about $15,000. For many years it was the largest building in the area. When Pope Paul VI established the Diocese of Gaylord on December 19, 1970, St. Mary's became the cathedral for the new diocese.

The first bishop of Gaylord, Edmund Szoka, had the present cathedral built. The cornerstone was laid on July 25, 1975. The new cathedral was dedicated to Our Lady of Mount Carmel on June 25, 1976. The bell tower and bells were consecrated in July 1977. A local group bought the old church in 1985 and converted it into a performing arts center named the Mount Carmel Centre.

== Architecture ==
St. Mary's Cathedral is an octagon-shaped structure built in the Modern architectural style. A statue of the Blessed Virgin Mary outside the south entrance was created by Jim Hopfensperger of Midland, Michigan. It is cast in bronze and was added to the grounds in 1991. A gathering space provides the entryway into the building. The baptismal font is an octagon shaped pool near the entrance. The altar is created from Vermont granite. Inside the altar are the relics of the evangelists Saint Matthew, Saint Mark and Saint Luke, a piece of Saint John's house, and pieces of bone from other saints. The pipe organ was built by the Gabriel Kney Company of London, Ontario, Canada. The 2,000 plus pipes were manufactured in Göttingen, Germany. The Blessed Sacrament Chapel contains a sculpture of The Burning Bush by Vera Bartnik of Traverse City, Michigan. The tabernacle is in the shape of a monstrance and has a luna suspended in a sunburst where the Eucharist is reserved. There are four shrine areas in the cathedral dedicated to the Sacred Heart, Saint Joseph, Our Lady of Czestochowa and Bishop Frederic Baraga. The stained glass windows portray the Litany of the Blessed Virgin Mary, and the Stations of the Cross are bronze bas reliefs. Four crosses with candles mark the four primary directions where the cathedral walls were consecrated with Sacred Chrism.

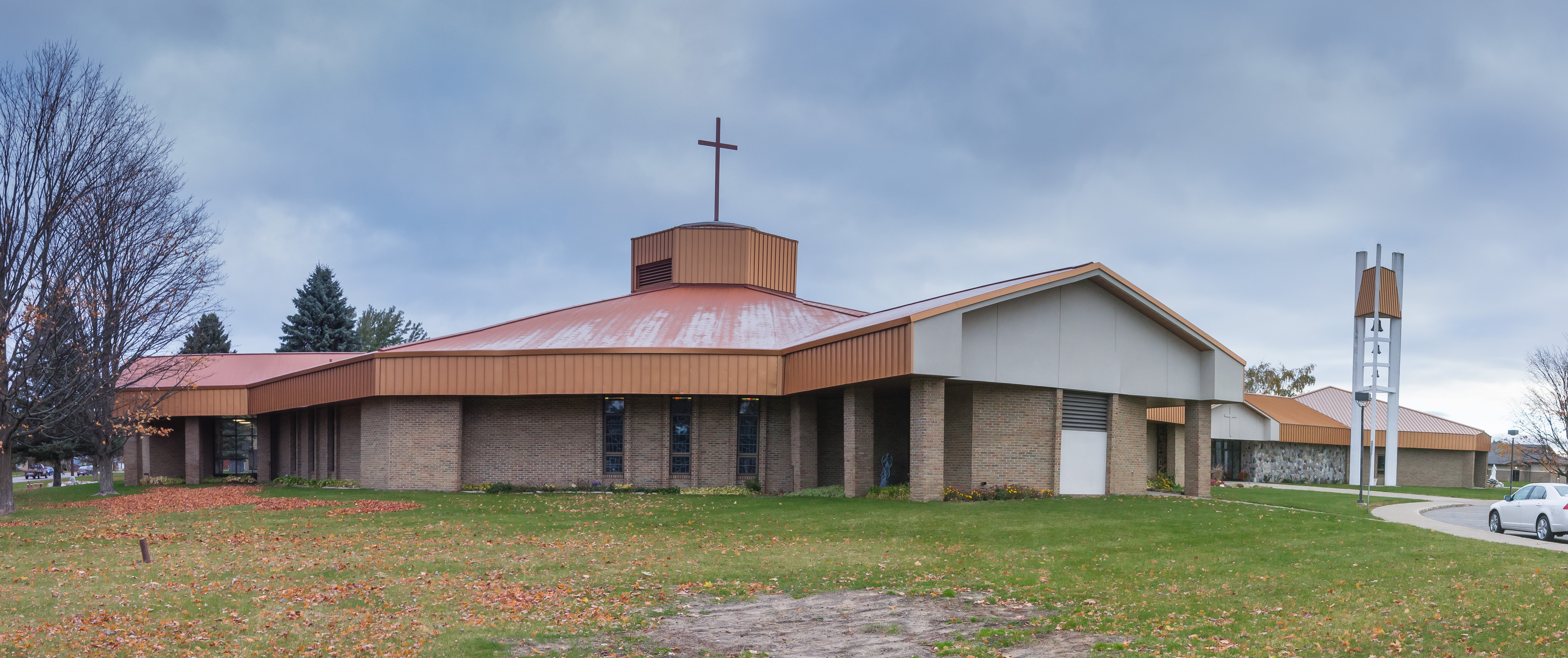
View from the southwest

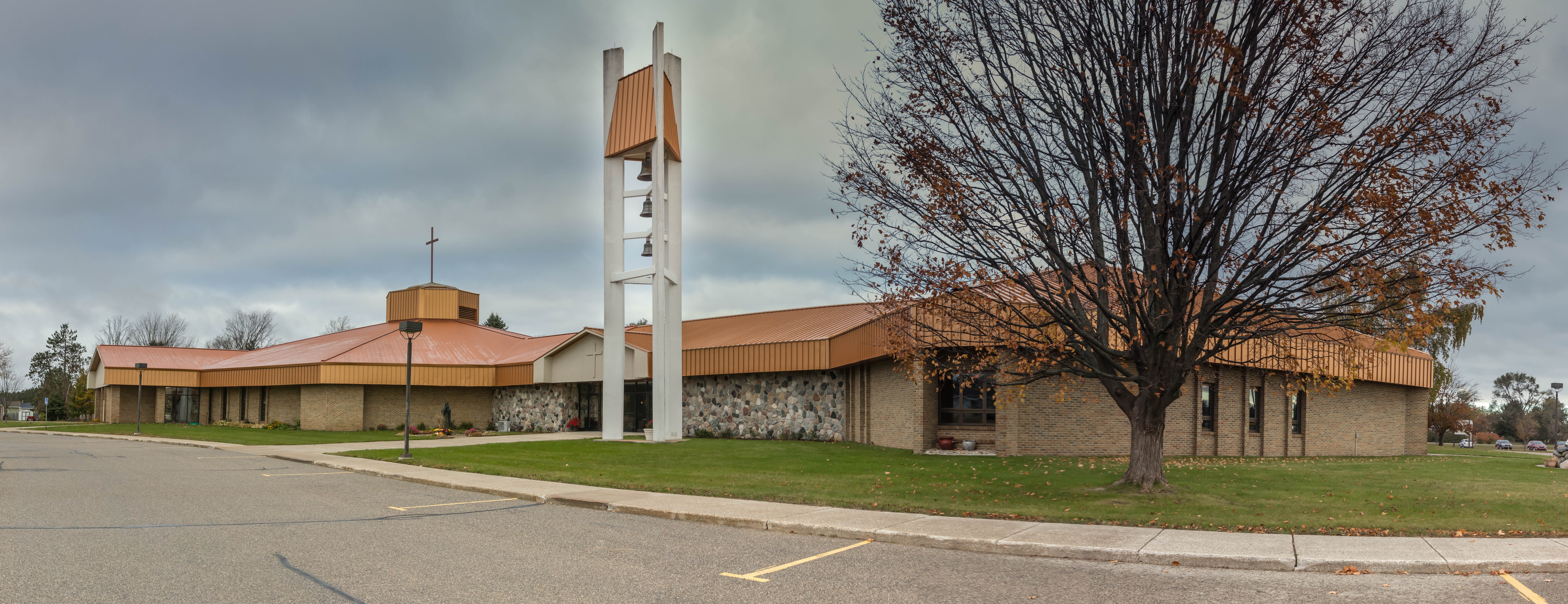
View from the southeast

== See also ==
- List of churches in the Roman Catholic Diocese of Gaylord
- List of Catholic cathedrals in the United States
- List of cathedrals in the United States
