= Allen James Babcock =

Catholic bishop

His Excellency, The Most Reverend Allen James Babcock
- Bishop of Grand Rapids; Titular Bishop of Irenopolis in Cilicia
- Church: Roman Catholic
- See: Diocese of Grand Rapids
- Appointed: February 15, 1947
- In office: March 25, 1947 to June 27, 1969
- Predecessor: Francis J. Haas
- Successor: Joseph M. Breitenbeck
- Previous posts: Auxiliary Bishop of Detroit; 1947 to 1954

Orders
- Ordination: March 7, 1925 by Basilio Pompili
- Consecration: March 25, 1948 by Edward Mooney

Personal details
- Born: June 17, 1898 Bad Axe, Michigan, US
- Died: June 27, 1969 (aged 71) Grand Rapids, Michigan, US
- Motto: Secundum verbum tuum (According to Your word)

Allen James Babcock (June 17, 1898 – June 27, 1969) was an American prelate of the Catholic Church who served as the seventh bishop of Grand Rapids in Michigan from 1954 to 1969.

== Biography ==
=== Early life ===
Babcock was born on June 17, 1898, in Bad Axe, Michigan to Willard Babcock and Susan Ryan. He attended the University of Detroit Jesuit High School in Detroit, then in 1917 entered Assumption College in Windsor, Ontario, studying there until 1919.

In 1920, Babcock traveled to Rome to reside at the Pontifical North American College. He received a Bachelor of Sacred Theology degree in 1922 and a Licentiate of Sacred Theology in 1924 from the Propaganda Fide University in Rome.

=== Priesthood ===
Babcock was ordained to the priesthood for the Archdiocese of Detroit by Cardinal Basilio Pompilj in Rome on March 7, 1925.After returning to Detroit, Babcock was assigned as assistant pastor at Holy Name Parish in that city. He was transferred in 1928 to serve as assistant pastor at St. Thomas Parish in Ann Arbor, Michigan. At the same time, he was appointed chaplain at the St. Mary's Student Parish next to the University of Michigan campus in Ann Arbor.

Babcock returned to Rome in 1936 to serve as vice rector for the North American College. Pope Pius XII honored him in 1938 with the title of papal chamberlain, allowing him to be called monsignor. (also March 9, 1939). With the closing of the North American College in 1940 due to World War II, Babcock came back to the United States; he was appointed pastor of St. Mary's parish in Ann Arbor. In 1942, Babcock was appointed rector of Blessed Sacrament in Detroit.

=== Auxiliary Bishop of Detroit ===
On February 15, 1947, Babcock was appointed as an auxiliary bishop of Detroit and titular bishop of Irenopolis in Cilicia by Pope Pius XII. He received his episcopal consecration at the Cathedral of the Most Blessed Sacrament in Detroit on March 25, 1947, from Cardinal Edward Mooney, with Bishops William Murphy and Stephen Woznicki serving as co-consecrators. Later that year, Babcock was appointed as vicar for the religious orders in the archdiocese and was named a domestic prelate by the pope. In 1948, he became a consultor for the archdiocese.

=== Bishop of Grand Rapids ===
On March 23, 1954, Pius XII appointed Babcock as bishop of Grand Rapids. He was installed on May 20, 1954. Babcock attended the Second Vatican Council in Rome (1962–1965).

=== Death and legacy ===
Allen Babcock died of cancer on June 27, 1969, at St. Mary's Hospital in Grand Rapids at age 71.

Catholic Church titles
Preceded by Francis J. Haas	Bishop of Grand Rapids; 1954–1969	Succeeded by Joseph M. Breitenbeck
Preceded by –	Auxiliary Bishop of Detroit; 1947–1954	Succeeded by –
