= Edmund Szoka =

American Roman Catholic priest and cardinal

His Eminence Edmund Szoka
- President of the Pontifical Commission for Vatican City State; President of the Governorate of Vatican City State
- Appointed: October 15, 1997
- Term ended: September 15, 2006
- Predecessor: Rosalio José Castillo Lara
- Successor: Giovanni Lajolo
- Other post: Cardinal Priest of Santi Andrea e Gregorio al Monte Celio (1988–2014)
- Previous posts: Bishop of Gaylord (1971–1981); Archbishop of Detroit (1981–1990); President of the Prefecture for the Economic Affairs of the Holy See (1990–1997)

Orders
- Ordination: June 5, 1954 by Thomas Lawrence Noa
- Consecration: July 20, 1971 by John Francis Dearden
- Created cardinal: June 28, 1988 by Pope John Paul II
- Rank: Cardinal priest

Personal details
- Born: September 14, 1927 Grand Rapids, Michigan, US
- Died: August 20, 2014 (aged 86) Novi, Michigan, US
- Motto: To live in faith

Styles of Edmund Szoka
- Reference style: His Eminence
- Spoken style: Your Eminence
- Informal style: Cardinal

Edmund Casimir Szoka (September 14, 1927 – August 20, 2014) was an American Catholic prelate who served as president of the Pontifical Commission for Vatican City State and as president of the Governorate of Vatican City State from 1997 to 2006. He previously served as bishop of Gaylord in Michigan from 1971 to 1981 and archbishop of Detroit in Michigan from 1981 to 1990. Szoka was elevated to the cardinalate in 1988.

== Early life ==
Edmund Szoka was born on September 14, 1927, in Grand Rapids, Michigan, to Casimir and Mary (née Wolgat) Szoka, Polish immigrants. He had an older sister, Irene. The family moved in the early 1930s to Muskegon, Michigan, where he did his primary studies at St. Michael School.

Deciding to become a priest at an early age, Szoka attended St. Joseph's Seminary in Grand Rapids, Michigan and the Sacred Heart Major Seminary in Detroit for his junior and senior years. He finished his theology studies at St. John's Provincial Seminary in Plymouth, Michigan.

== Priesthood ==
On June 5, 1954, Szoka was ordained to the priesthood for the Diocese of Marquette by Bishop Thomas Noa in St. Peter's Cathedral in Marquette, Michigan.

He did pastoral work in Manistique. From 1957 to 1959, he studied canon law at the Pontifical Urbaniana University or the Pontifical Lateran University in Rome. He then became secretary to Bishop Noa of Marquette, whom he accompanied to the first session of the Second Vatican Council in 1962. During this period, he also served as chaplain at St. Mary's Hospital and K. I. Sawyer Air Force Base near Marquette. Upon returning to the United States, Szoka did pastoral and curial work, including serving as an official of the matrimonial tribunal in Marquette until 1971. He was raised to the rank of honorary prelate on November 14, 1963, by Pope Paul VI.

== Episcopal ministry ==
=== Bishop of Gaylord ===
Szoka was appointed by Paul VI as the first bishop of Gaylord on June 11, 1971. He received his episcopal consecration on July 20, 1971, from Cardinal John Francis Dearden, with Bishops Charles Salatka and Joseph McKinney serving as co-consecrators.

A year later, the bishops of the fourth pastoral region of the National Conference of Catholic Bishops (NCCB) elected him as regional president, serving from 1972 to 1977. At the same time, he served as treasurer and secretary of the Episcopal Conference of Michigan. As bishop of Gaylord, Szoka improved the annulment consideration process, drawing from his experience in the matrimonial tribunal in Marquette.

=== Archbishop of Detroit ===
On March 21, 1981, Szoka was named the third archbishop of Detroit by Pope John Paul II.He served on committees within the NCCB for: human values, bishops, dioceses and provinces, and economic affairs. He welcomed John Paul II to Detroit in 1987 during his tenure as archbishop.

In 1983, Szoka dealt with the case of Agnes Mary Mansour, a nun and the director of the Michigan Department of Community Health who worked to continue abortion services in Michigan. Szoka had given his permission for Mansour to serve the state but said she must oppose publicly funded abortion. Mansour believed abortion was tragic but should be legal, and she continued disbursing Medicaid abortion funds. Szoka appealed to Mansour's superiors in the Sisters of Mercy but the order supported her stance. Szoka referred the case to the Vatican, and Bishop Anthony Bevilacqua resolved it by ordering Mansour to resign either her government post or her orders. Mansour left the sisterhood.

Szoka was created a cardinal in 1988, becoming cardinal-priest of the Church of Ss. Andrea e Gregorio al Monte Celio in at the hands of John Paul II in the consistory of June 28, 1988.Szoka received a great deal of criticism when he closed 31 inner-city churches in Detroit from 1989 to 1990; many were sparsely attended. It was the first large-scale closing of Catholic churches in a major American city.

== Roman Curia ==
Resigning as archbishop of Detroit on April 28, 1990, Szoka had been named president of the Prefecture for the Economic Affairs of the Holy See on January 22, 1990, and served as such to October 14, 1997. In this position, he helped manage the Vatican's financial affairs.

On October 14, 1997, Cardinal Szoka was named president of the Governorate of Vatican City State, and on February 22, 2001, president of the Pontifical Commission for Vatican City State. Within the Roman Curia, his membership included: Secretariat of State (second section) and Causes of Saints, Bishops, Evangelization of Peoples (Congregatio de Propaganda Fide), Clergy, Institutes of Consecrated Life and Societies of Apostolic Life (congregations). He submitted his resignation to John Paul II in 2002, at the Church's mandatory retirement age of 75, but was requested to continue working. During his rare spare time, Szoka enjoyed walking through the Vatican Gardens.

Szoka participated in the 2005 papal conclave that selected Pope Benedict XVI. As governor of the Vatican, it fell to Szoka, along with Secretary of State Angelo Sodano and Camerlengo Eduardo Martínez Somalo, to prepare for the cardinal electors' housing at the Domus Sanctae Marthae in Vatican City.

== Retirement ==
It was announced on June 22, 2006, that his resignation had been accepted by Benedict VI and that he would officially step down on September 15, 2006; he maintained all curial memberships until age 80. On what he would do after retirement, Szoka said he was interested in travel, writing, studying the Church Fathers, and continuing to provide priestly assistance to Detroit.

Szoka died on August 20, 2014, at Providence Park Hospital in Novi, Michigan.

== Memberships as archbishop ==
- President of the Administration Council for St. John's Provincial Seminary and of SS. Cyril and Methodius Seminary in Orchard Lake Village, Michigan.
- Board president of the Episcopal Conference of Michigan
- Member of the executive committee of the Catholic University of America,
- President of the Committee for University Relations,
- Administrator of the National Sanctuary of the Immaculate Conception,
- Treasurer of the NCCB

== Sources ==
- "Memories of John Paul II". National Catholic Register. April 2, 2010.
- "Cardinal Edmund Szoka". Archdiocese of Detroit. Archdiocese of Detroit. Archived from the original on September 10, 2014.

Catholic Church titles
New title New Position Created	President of the Governorate of Vatican City State; 1997–2006	Succeeded by Giovanni Lajolo
Vacant Title last held by Rosalio José Castillo Lara	President of the Pontifical Commission for Vatican City State; 2001–2006	Succeeded by Giovanni Lajolo
Preceded by Giuseppe Caprio	President of the Prefecture for the Economic Affairs of the Holy See; 1990–1997	Succeeded by Sergio Sebastiani
Preceded by John Francis Dearden	Archbishop of Detroit; 1981–1990	Succeeded by Adam Maida
New title Diocese erected	Bishop of Gaylord; 1971–1981	Succeeded by Robert John Rose
