= Holy See–India relations =

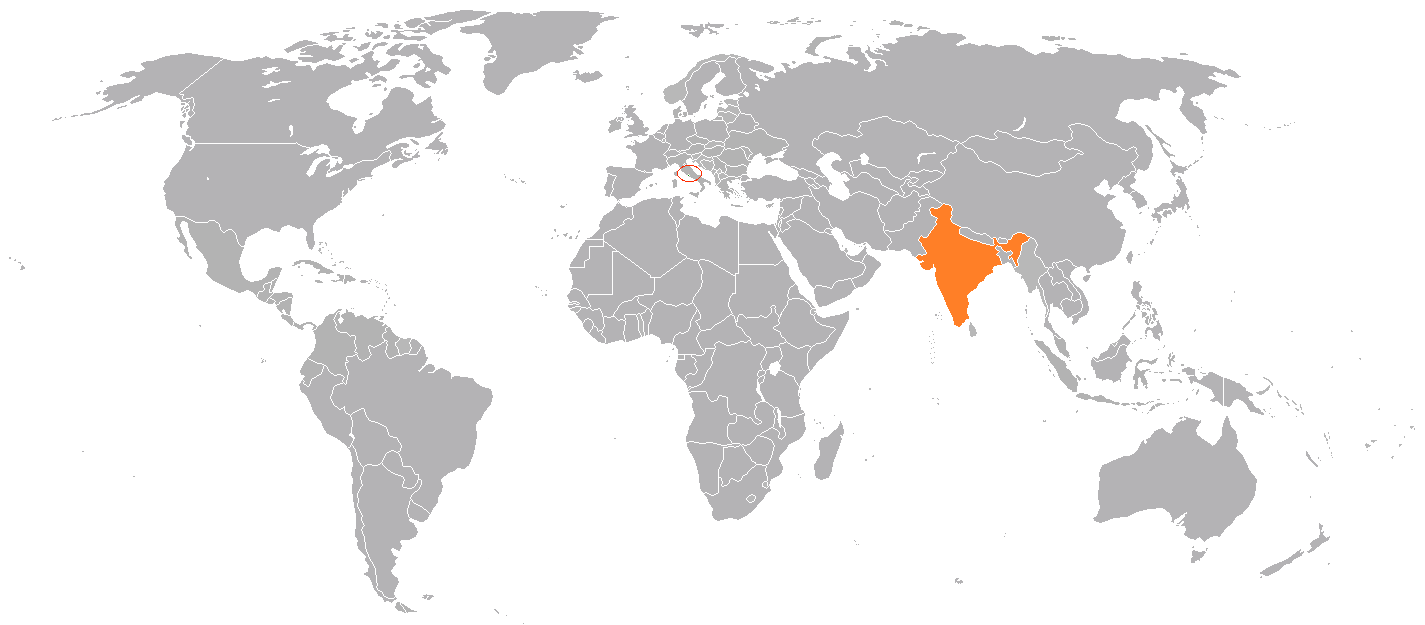
- Holy See: India

Diplomatic mission
- Apostolic Nunciature to India: Embassy of India to the Holy See

Envoy
- Apostolic Nuncio to India Waldemar Stanisław Sommertag: Ambassador of India to the Holy See Shambhu S. Kumaran

Holy See–India relations are the bilateral relations between the India and Holy See, which is sovereign over the Vatican City. An Apostolic Delegation to the East Indies existed from 1881 and formal bilateral relations with independent India exist since 12 June 1948. The Holy See has an nunciature in New Delhi while India has accredited its embassy in Vienna, Austria to the Holy See as well. Shambhu S. Kumaran, India's ambassador to Austria has been the ambassador to the Holy See since 2024, while Archbishop Waldemar Stanisław Sommertag has been the Apostolic Nuncio to India since 2026.

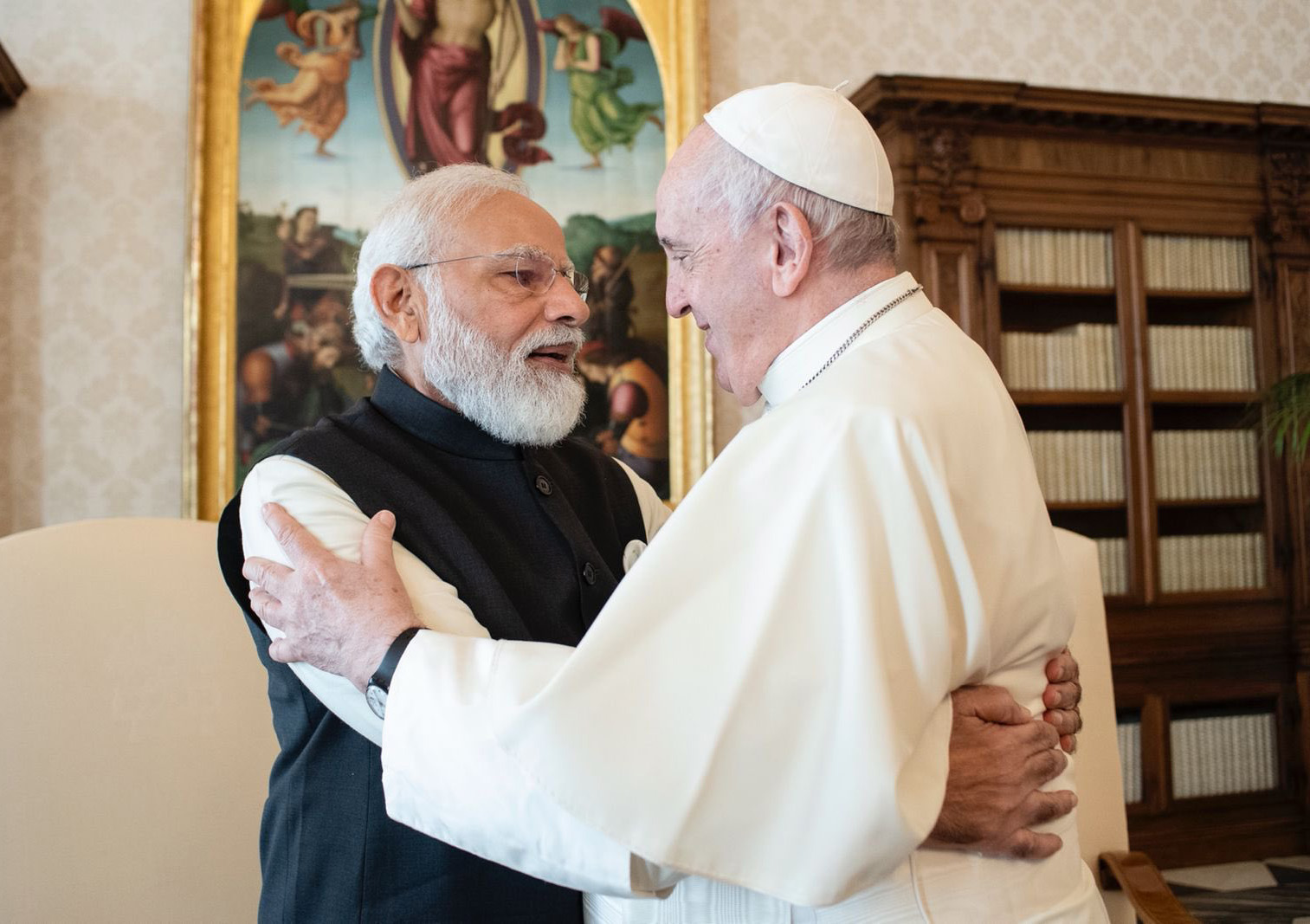
The Prime Minister, Narendra Modi meeting with Pope Francis, in Vatican City on October 30, 2021

== History ==
Connections between the Catholic church and India can be traced back to the apostle St. Thomas, who, according to tradition, came to India in 52 AD. There is a record of an Indian bishop visiting Rome at the time of Pope Callixtus II (1119–1124).

The diplomatic mission was established as the Apostolic Delegation to the East Indies in 1881 based in Ceylon, and was extended to Malaca in 1889, and then to Burma in 1920, and eventually included Goa in 1923. It was raised to an Internunciature to all of India by Pope Pius XII on 12 June 1948 and to a full Apostolic Nunciature by Pope Paul VI on 22 August 1967. India initially had a legation to the Holy See, with the Minister at Berne accredited as Minister to the Holy See. The Indian mission was raised to the status of an embassy led by an ambassador in 1965. India's Ambassador in Bern had traditionally been accredited to the Holy See until 2020, since when the Ambassador in Vienna has been assigned the role.

== Bilateral visits ==
There have been three Papal visits to India. The first Pope to visit India was Pope Paul VI, who visited Mumbai in 1964 to attend the International Eucharistic Congress. Pope John Paul II visited several places in India including Chennai in February 1986 and then again visited New Delhi in November 1999. Several Indian dignitaries have, from time to time, called on the Pope in the Vatican. These include Prime Minister Jawaharlal Nehru in 1955, Prime Minister Indira Gandhi in 1981, Prime Minister I.K. Gujral in September 1997, Prime Minister Atal Bihari Vajpayee in 2000 and Prime Minister Narendra Modi in 2021.

== Dignitaries at events ==
Vice-president Bhairon Singh Shekhawat represented the country at the funeral of Pope John Paul II. External Affairs minister Sushma Swaraj led a delegation to the Vatican for the canonisation function of Saint Teresa of Calcutta in September 2016, when she also called on Pope Francis. She was accompanied by the Chief Minister of West Bengal, Mamata Banerjee. President Droupadi Murmu, union ministers Kiren Rijiju and George Kurian, and deputy speaker of the Legislative Assembly of Goa Joshua De Souza represented India at the funeral of Pope Francis. Deputy chairman of the Rajya Sabha Harivansh Narayan Singh and deputy chief minister of Nagaland Yanthungo Patton represented India at the inauguration of the pontificate of Pope Leo XIV.

== Indian ambassadors to the Holy See ==
From	Till	Name	Designation
1949	1951	Dhirajlal Bhulabhai Desai	Minister
1951	1952	Nedyan Raghaven	Minister
1952	1953	Asaf Ali	Minister
1953	1954	Yezdezard Dinshaw Gundevia	Minister
1954	1955	Abid Hasan Safrani	Chargé d'affaires
1955	1958	Mohan Sinha Mehta	Minister
1958	1961	M. K. Vellodi	Minister
1962	1964	Mohamed Abdul Rauf	Minister
1964	1965	Vishnuprasad Chunilal Trivedi	Minister
1965	1967	Vishnuprasad Chunilal Trivedi	Ambassador
1968	1970	Mohamed Azim Husain	Ambassador
1971	1974	Arjan Singh	Ambassador
1974	1977	Avtar Singh	Ambassador
1977	1978	Uma Shankar Bajpai	Ambassador
1978	1979	Amba Prasad	Chargé d'affaires
1979	1981	Gurbachan Singh	Ambassador
1981	1982	Narendra Singh	Ambassador
1982	1985	Thomas Abraham	Ambassador
1985	1986	Om Parkash Aggarwal	Chargé d'affaires
1986	1990	Ashoke Sen Chib	Ambassador
1990	1994	Madhaw Keshav Mangalmurti	Ambassador
1994	2000	Kizhakke Pisharath Balakrishnan	Ambassador
2000	2002	Niranjan Natverlal Desai	Ambassador
2002	2005	Praveen Lal Goyal	Ambassador
2005	2006	Snehi Desh Bandhu	Chargé d'affaires
2006	2008	Amitava Tripathi	Ambassador
2008	2009	Ajaneesh Kumar	Chargé d'affaires
2009	2013	Chitra Narayanan	Ambassador
2013	2014	Nagendra Prasad	Chargé d'affaires
2014	2015	Mysore Kapanaiah Lokesh	Ambassador
2015	2017	Smitha Purushottam	Ambassador
2017	2020	Sibi George	Ambassador
2020	2024	Jaideep Mazumdar	Ambassador
2024	present	Shambhu S. Kumaran	Ambassador

== See also ==
- Apostolic Nunciature to India
