= List of ambassadors of India to Switzerland =

Ambassador of India to Switzerland
- Incumbent; Mridul Kumar since 19 June 2023
- Nominator: Droupadi Murmu
- Inaugural holder: Dhirajlal B.Desai
- Formation: 17 December 1948
- Website: Embassy of India, Berne, Switzerland

The Indian Ambassador to Switzerland is the chief diplomatic representative of India to Switzerland and Liechtenstein, housed in the Embassy of India, Bern. The current ambassador is Mridul Kumar.

Formerly the ambassadors were also concurrently accorded to Holy See, currently Indian ambassador in Vienna is accredited to Holy See.

== List of Indian ambassadors to Switzerland ==
The list of diplomats is as noted:

S. No.	Name	Date of charge assumption	Date of charge relinquishment
1	Dhirajlal B.Desai	17 December 1948	21 March 1951
2	M.Asaf Ali	10 July 1952	02 April 1953
3	Y.D. Gundevia	17 May 1953	30 September 1954
4	Dr. Mohan Sinha Mehta	07 June 1955	01 June 1958
5	M.K Vellodi	04 June 1958	25 November 1961
6	M.A. Rauf	29 December 1961	29 August 1964
7	V.C. Trivedi	02 December 1964	23 November 1967
8	M. A. Hussain	01 December 1967	07 October 1970
9	Air Chief Marshal Arjun Singh	27 March 1971	26 March 1974
10	Avtar Singh	02 September 1974	29 April 1977
11	Uma Shankar Bajpai	30 June 1977	31 May 1978
12	Gurbachan Singh	03 October 1978	31 May 1981
13	Narendra Singh	18 June 1981	20 March 1982
14	Thomas Abraham	23 September 1982	30 September 1985
15	Ashok Sen Chib	21 November 1985	31 July 1989
16	M. K. Mangalmurti	14 August 1989	10 July 1994
17	K.P. Balakrishnan	14 July 1994	31 October 2000
18	N.N. Desai	02 November 2000	30 June 2002
19	Praveen L. Goyal	03 July 2002	31 October 2005
20	Amitava Tripathi	17 December 2005	28 February 2008
21	Chitra Narayanan	18 August 2008	30 November 2013
22	M.K. Lokesh	18 December 2013	31 May 2015
23	Smita Purushottam	06 August 2015	31 October 2017
24	Sibi George	12 November 2017	03 August 2020
25	Monika Kapil Mohta	05 August 2020	31 January 2022
24	Sanjay Bhattacharyya	06 February 2022	31 December 2022
25	Mridul Kumar	19 June 2023	Incumbent

== See also ==
- List of ambassadors of India to France
- India–Switzerland relations
