= Martin Lucas =

- Apostolic Delegate Emeritus to Scandinavia
- See: Titular Archbishop of Adulis

Orders
- Ordination: 26 October 1924
- Consecration: 29 October 1945 by Pietro Fumasoni Biondi

Personal details
- Born: 16 October 1894 Haarlem, Netherlands
- Died: 3 March 1969 (aged 74)

Martin Lucas (16 October 1894 – 3 March 1969) was a Catholic archbishop and diplomat of the Holy See.

== Biography ==
Lucas was born in Haarlem, Netherlands, on 16 October 1894. He was ordained a priest of the Society of the Divine Word on 26 October 1924. He was appointed Apostolic Delegate to South Africa and Titular Archbishop of Adulis on 14 September 1945. On 29 October 1945 he was ordained a bishop by Cardinal Pietro Fumasoni Biondi, while the co-consecrators were Archbishop Celso Benigno Luigi Costantini and Bishop Johannes Hendrik Olav Smit.

On 3 December 1952 he was appointed the Apostolic Internuncio to India. From 1956 to 1959, he served as an official of the Secretariat of State in Rome. On 16 April 1959 he was named the first Apostolic Delegate to Scandinavia, with responsibility for Denmark, Norway, and Sweden. He resigned in October 1961.

Lucas attended the Second Vatican Council.

Diplomatic posts
Preceded by Leo Peter Kierkels, CP	Apostolic Nuncio to India; 3 December 1952 – 1 Jan 1957	Succeeded by James Knox
