= Leo Peter Kierkels =

Catholic archbishop from The Netherlands

- Apostolic Nuncio Emeritus to India
- See: Titular Archbishop of Salamis

Orders
- Ordination: 22 December 1906
- Consecration: 26 April 1931 by Willem Marinus van Rossum

Personal details
- Born: 12 December 1882 Baexem, Netherlands
- Died: 7 November 1957 (aged 74)

Leo Peter Kierkels (1882–1957) was a Catholic archbishop and diplomat of the Holy See.

== Biography ==
Kierkels was born in Baexem, Netherlands on 12 December 1882. He was ordained a priest of the Congregation of the Passion on 22 December 1906. He was appointed Apostolic Delegate to India and Titular Archbishop of Salamis on 23 March 1931. On 26 April 1931, he was ordained a bishop by Cardinal Willem Marinus van Rossum, while the co-consecrators were Archbishop Pietro Pisani, who had himself been the Apostolic Delegate to India from 1919 to 1924, and Bishop Giovanni Battista Peruzzo. On 1 July 1948, he was elevated to the Apostolic Internunciature to India. He resigned as Apostolic Internuncio on 29 June 1952, having served as the papal representative to India for 21 years. Kierkerls died on 7 November 1957.

Diplomatic posts
Preceded by Edward Aloysius Mooney	Apostolic Nuncio to India; 23 March 1931 – 29 June 1952	Succeeded by Martin Lucas, SVD
