= Henry Donnelly =

Henry Donnelly may refer to:

- Henry Edmund Donnelly (1904–1967), American bishop of the Catholic Church
- Henry Grattan Donnelly (1850–1931), American author and playwright
