= Palmer Woods =

Historic neighborhood in Detroit, Michigan

- Palmer Woods Historic District
- U.S. National Register of Historic Places
- U.S. Historic district
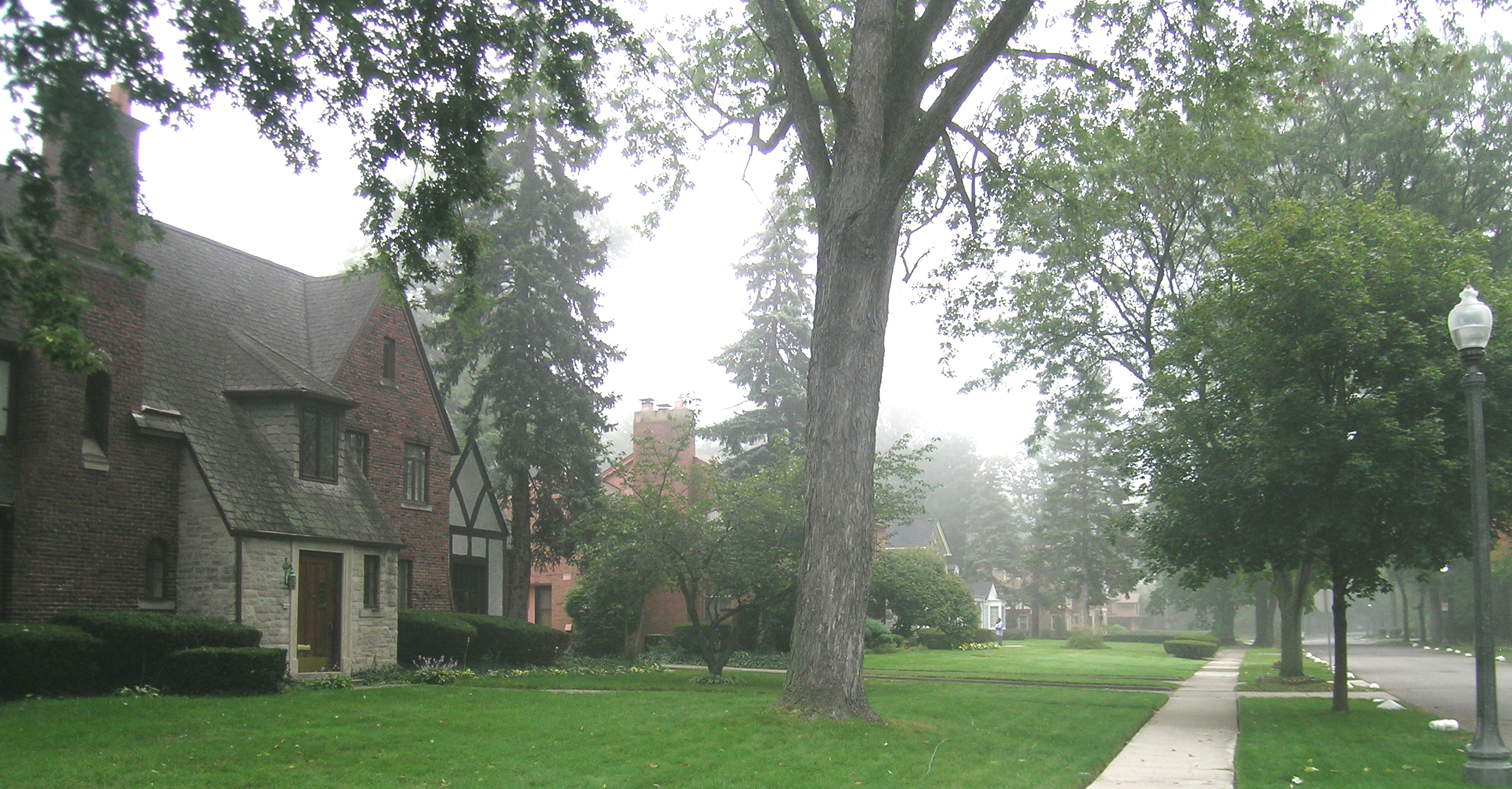
- Streetscape along Strathcona Drive
- Interactive map
- Location: Detroit, Michigan, U.S.
- Coordinates: 42°26′5″N 83°7′28″W
- Built: 1915
- Architect: Multiple
- Architectural style: Colonial Revival, Tudor Revival
- NRHP reference No.: 83000896
- Added to NRHP: August 11, 1983

The Palmer Woods Historic District is a neighborhood located in Detroit, Michigan, bounded by Seven Mile Road, Woodward Avenue, and Strathcona Drive. There are approximately 295 homes in the 188-acre (0.76 km^{2}) district, which is between the City of Highland Park in Wayne County and the City of Ferndale in Oakland County. It was listed on the National Register of Historic Places in 1983. The Detroit Golf Club is nearby.

== History ==
The Palmer Woods Historic District is named after Thomas W. Palmer, a prominent citizen of nineteenth-century Detroit and a United States Senator. Palmer's estate included land on both sides of Woodward Avenue, stretching from Six Mile Road to Eight Mile Road. During his lifetime, Palmer donated some of his land to the city of Detroit to establish Palmer Park, and he gave additional land to the state of Michigan to build the Michigan State Fairgrounds.

Palmer died in 1913; two years later, Detroit real-estate developer Charles W. Burton purchased the section of Palmer's estate that now encompasses the Palmer Woods Historic District. Burton envisioned an exclusive neighborhood catering to Detroit's richest citizens, with room for spacious and elegant homes. He hired the landscape architect Ossian Cole Simonds to design the layout of the development. Cole laid out a subdivision with gently curving streets, capitalizing on the natural beauty of the area and creating a park-like atmosphere in the neighborhood. Curbs are nonexistent, minimizing the transition from street to lawn and discouraging pedestrian traffic, and every lot in the neighborhood had a unique shape.

Many Colonial Revival and Tudor Revival style homes were constructed between about 1917 and 1929. The neighborhood received the Michigan Horticultural Society's Award of Merit in 1938 for being the finest platted subdivision in Michigan. After World War II, additional mansions were constructed.

In 2007 and 2008, there were around 24 residential properties that were vacant. By 2011, the community established its own private security service. By 2014, housing prices, which had previously declined, began to rebound.

== Demographics ==
As of 2020, the neighborhood had a median household income of $155,917. Ethnically, Palmer Woods is 74.8% African American, 17.1% European American, and 6.2% Hispanic.

== Architecture ==
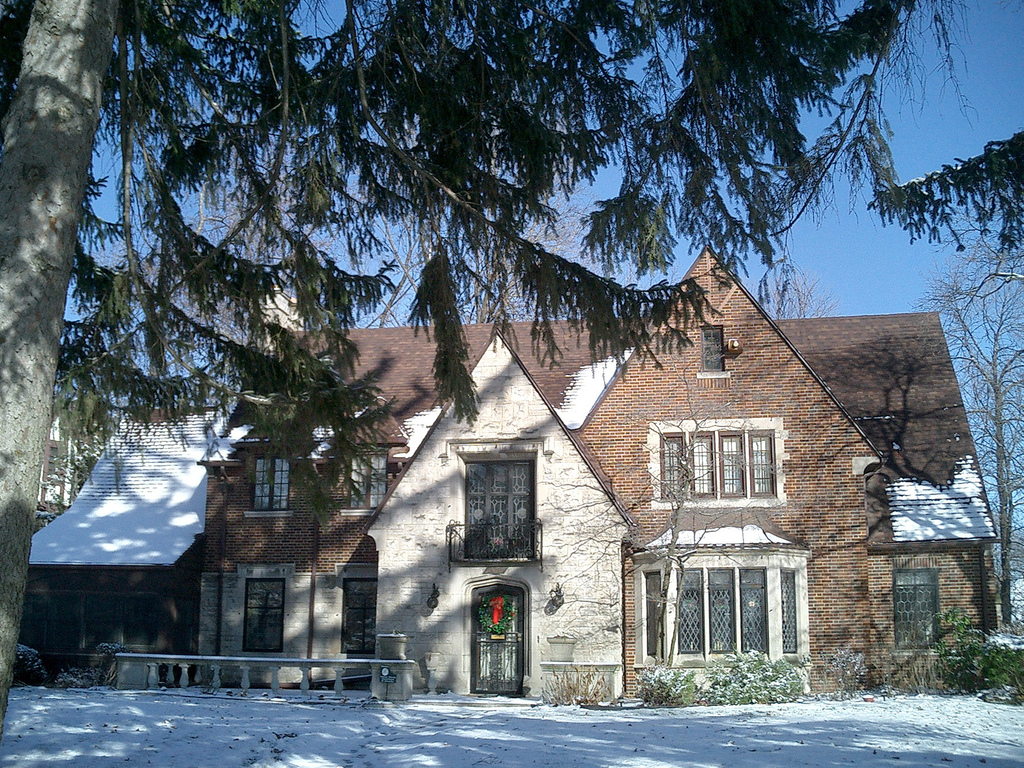
1920s Tudor Revival house in Palmer Woods

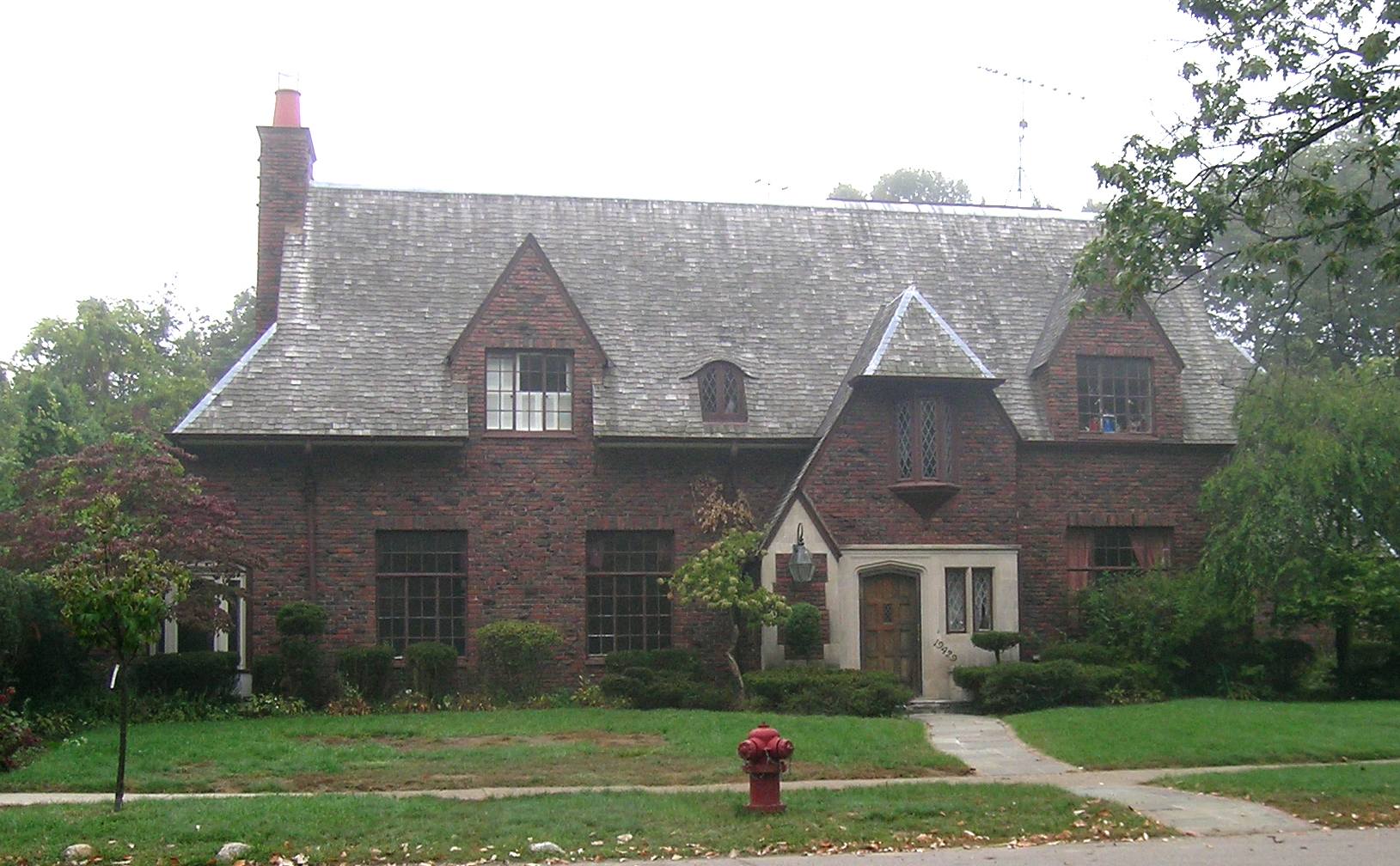
Shingle style house in Palmer Woods

Palmer Woods is known for its elm-lined streets with large brick and stone homes in Tudor Revival architecture, set back from the street behind contiguous uninterrupted lawn. Lots are large, with ample room for trees, play equipment, and a good expanse of grass. There may be coats of arms, leaded or stained glass windows, and other features (such as elevators) in some of the homes. Various properties boast more than one structure, such as a house and guest house, or maids' quarters. Streets gently curve through the forested neighborhood.

Palmer Woods has its own security service and an active voluntary neighborhood association. The home of physicians, politicians, business owners, artists, executives and their families, the Palmer Woods neighborhood has attracted some of Detroit's most prominent citizens. Charles W. Burton himself made his home in the neighborhood.

Two of the seven Fisher Brothers (owners of Fisher Body), Alfred and William, also lived in the neighborhood. William Fisher's former house, at 1791 Wellesley Drive, is 35,000 square feet (3,300 m^{2}), one of the largest in Detroit. Alfred J. Fisher's former mansion is located at 1771 Balmoral Drive. John H. Kunsky, the founder of United Artists theatres, also lived in the area.

Almost every house in Palmer Woods has unique architectural features, but a number are particularly important. At the southern edge of the district is the Dorothy H. Turkel House, the only house in Detroit designed by Frank Lloyd Wright. C. Howard Crane, the noted theater architect, designed the home of John H. Kunsky, incorporating many theater elements into the design. Minoru Yamasaki and Leonard B. Willeke also designed houses in the district.

=== Bishop Gallagher residence ===
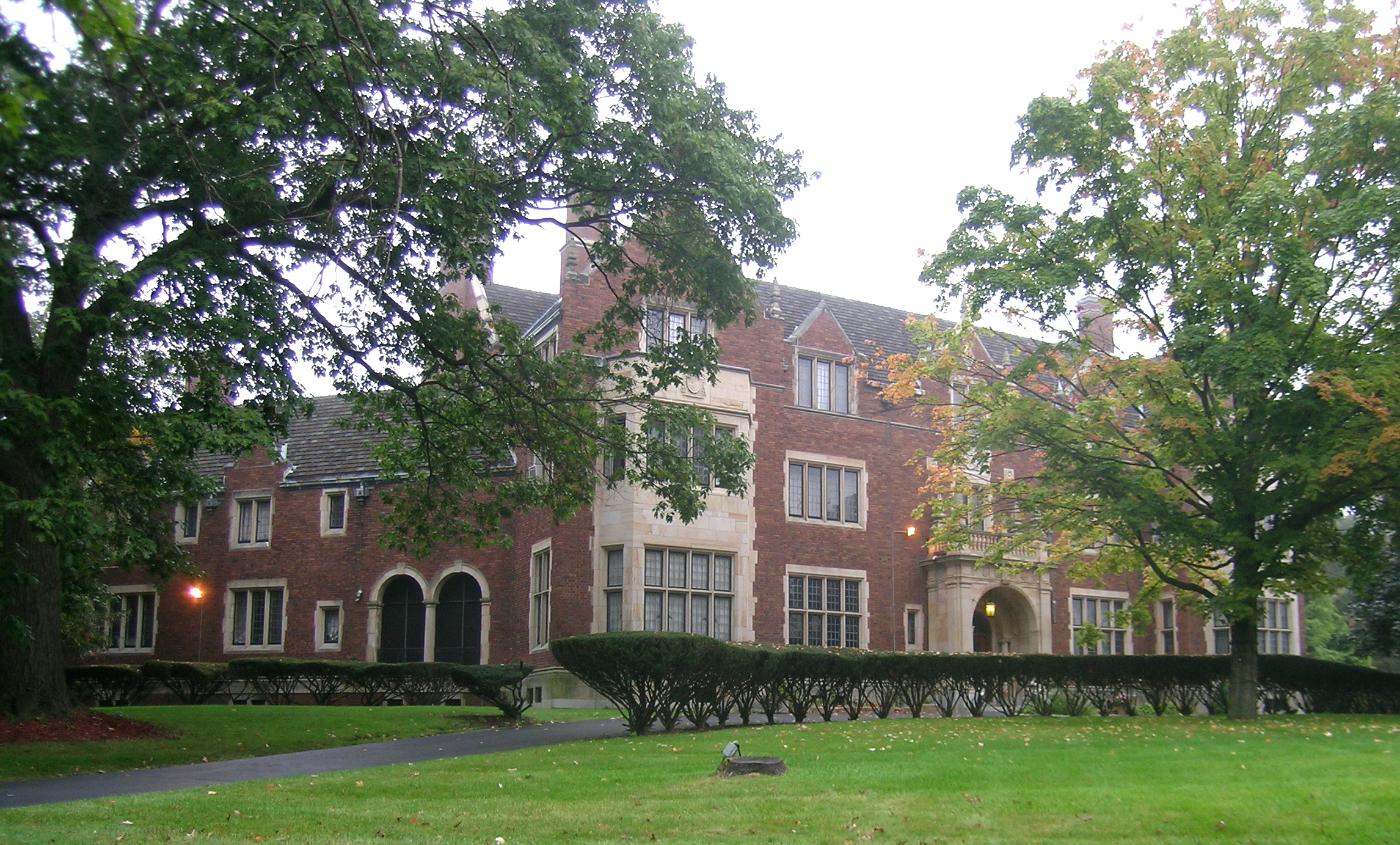
McGinnis and Walsh designed this Tudor Revival mansion, known as the Bishop Gallagher residence (1925)

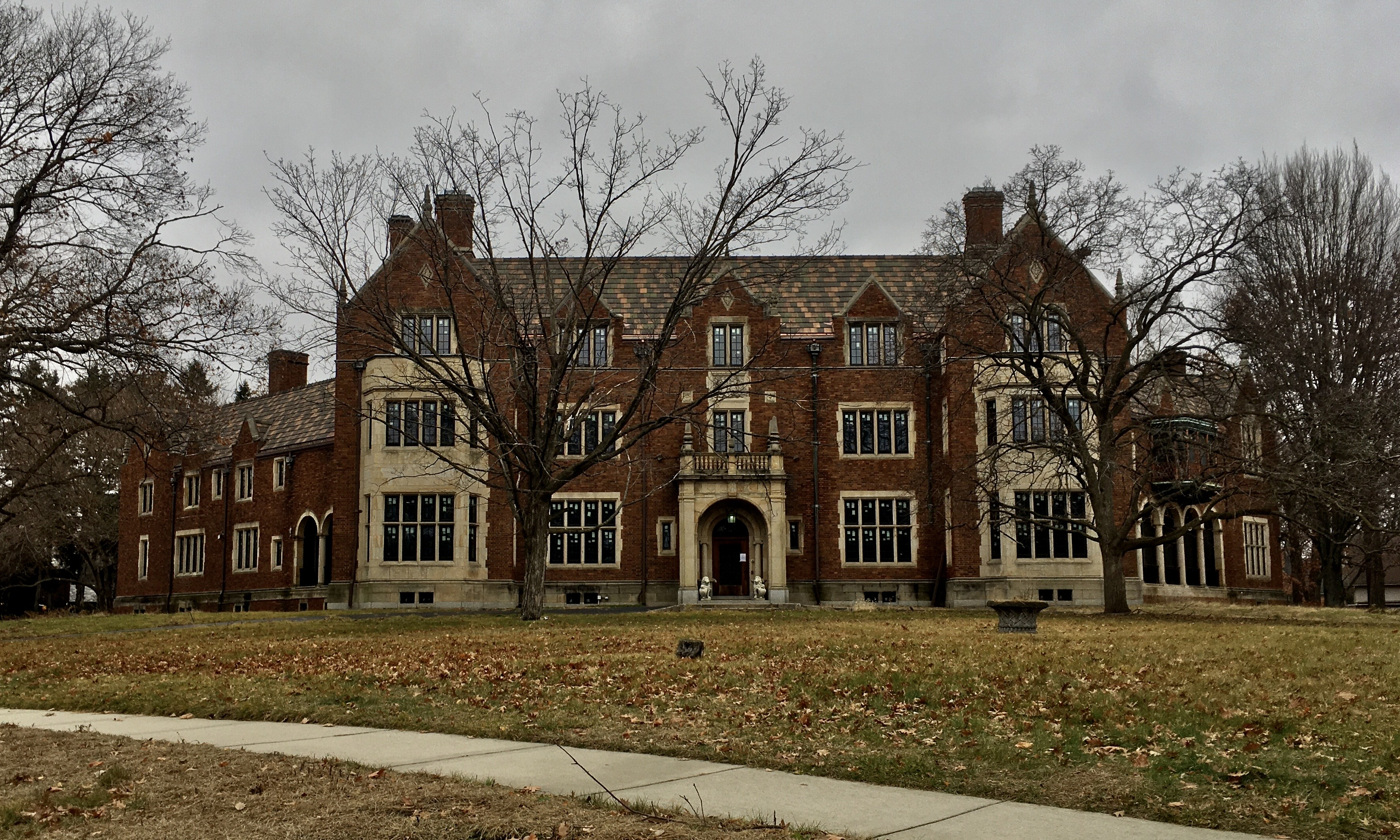
Front of the mansion in 2020

Probably the most significant house in the district is the 62-room Bishop Gallagher residence at 19366 Lucerne Drive (also known as 1880 Wellesley Drive). The mansion was built in 1925 for the Fisher brothers, who hired the Boston firm of McGinnis and Walsh, specialists in ecclesiastical architecture, to design the Tudor Revival structure. Upon completion, the Fisher brothers gave the property to Bishop Michael Gallagher, of the Roman Catholic Archdiocese of Detroit. The 40,000-square-foot (3,700 m^{2}) home is the largest within the city of Detroit.

The two-story brick building consists of a large central structure flanked by diagonal wings. There are numerous exterior bays, each topped with a parapet capped with masonry and a finial. Religious themes are included throughout the house, both on the exterior and the interior. On the exterior, medallions, shields and crests are set into the brickwork, and a copper statue of the Archangel Michael defeating Satan is prominent. The interior is finished with oak, stone and masonry. The residence had, at one time, the largest collection of Pewabic glazed pottery tile in Michigan.

Bishop Gallagher lived in this house until his death in 1937. Subsequent archbishops of Detroit (Cardinals Edward Mooney and John Dearden) also lived in the home. Upon Cardinal Dearden's death in 1988, the archdiocese sold the mansion in 1989 to John Salley of the Detroit Pistons for $500,000.

In 1995, the property was sold by Salley to Bishop Wayne T. Jackson of Great Faith Ministries International, who used it as a home and as offices for his ministry. In 2017, the mansion was sold by Jackson for more than $2.5 million to a real estate developer from California who collects historic houses.

Forbidden Fruits (2006), a movie produced by Marc Cayce, was filmed inside the Bishop Gallagher residence.

== Schools ==
Palmer Woods is within the Detroit Public Schools district. Residents are zoned to Palmer Park Preparatory Academy, formerly the Barbara Jordan School, for elementary and middle school. All residents are zoned to Mumford High School. Palmer Park is operated by teachers and not by a principal administrator.

== Notable residents ==
- Mike Duggan
- Mitt Romney (resided in the community until he was five years old)
