= T. P. Seetharam =

Indian civil servant

Ambassador of India to the United Arab Emirates
- In office 2013–2016
- Preceded by: M. K. Lokesh
- Succeeded by: Navdeep Singh Suri

High Commissioner of India to Mauritius
- In office 09 September 2011 – 06 December 2013
- Preceded by: M. Ganapathi
- Succeeded by: Anup K. Mudgal

Personal details
- Occupation: Civil servant IFS

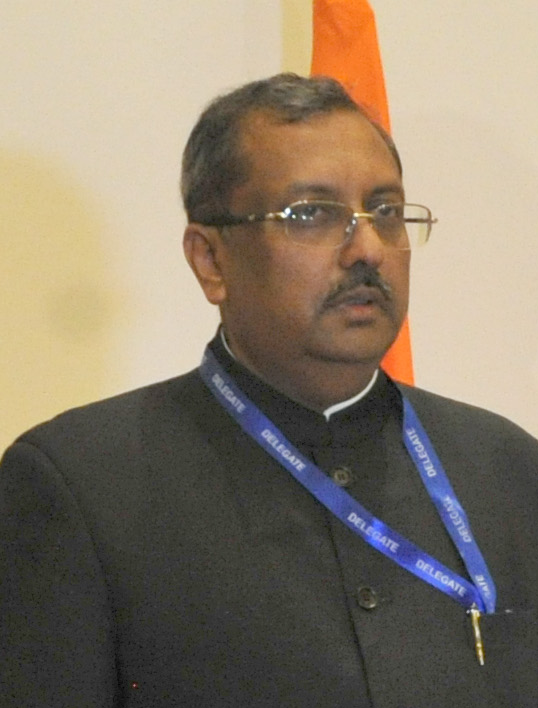

T.P. Seetharam is an Indian Civil servant and was the Indian ambassador to United Arab Emirates and the director general of the India Taipei Association.

== Positions held ==
- High Commissioner of India to Mauritius.

== Indian Foreign Service ==
He is a 1980 batch officer of the Indian Foreign Service.
