= Apostolic Nunciature to India =

Diplomatic post of the Holy See

- Address: 50-C, Niti Marg, Chanakyapuri, New Delhi, Delhi 110021
- Coordinates: 28°36′01″N 77°11′42″E
- Jurisdiction: India
- Apostolic Nuncio: Waldemar Stanisław Sommertag
- Website: Official website

The Apostolic Nunciature to India is an ecclesiastical office of the Catholic Church and the diplomatic mission of the Holy See to India, equivalent to an embassy. Headed by the Apostolic Nuncio who holds the rank of ambassador the mission represents the Pope as head of state of Vatican City to the President of India, while also serving as the primary liaison between the Pope and the Catholic hierarchy in India. The Apostolic Nuncio to India typically serves concurrently as the Apostolic Nuncio to Nepal.

Polish Archbishop Waldemar Stanisław Sommertag has served as Apostolic Nuncio since his appointment by Pope Leo XIV on 14 November 2026, having previously served as Apostolic Nuncio to Senegal.

== History ==
The diplomatic mission was established as the Apostolic Delegation to the East Indies in 1881, and included Ceylon, and was extended to Malaca in 1889, and then to Burma in 1920, and eventually included Goa in 1923. It was raised to an Internunciature by Pope Pius XII on 12 June 1948 and to a full Apostolic Nunciature by Pope Paul VI on 22 August 1967. Ceylon (now Sri Lanka) was detached in 1967, Burma (now Myanmar) in 1973 and Malaca, as part of modern Malaysia, being detached in 1957.

== List of papal representatives ==
Apostolic Delegates

- Antonio Agliardi (23 September 1884 – 9 May 1887)
- Andrea Aiuti (31 March 1887 – 24 July 1891)
- Wladyslaw Michal Zaleski (15 March 1892 – 7 December 1916)
- Pietro Fumasoni Biondi (15 November 1916 – 6 December 1919)
- Pietro Pisani (15 December 1919 – 1924)
- Edward Aloysius Mooney (18 January 1926 – 30 March 1931)
- Leo Peter Kierkels, CP (23 March 1931 – 12 June 1948)

Apostolic Internuncios

- Leo Peter Kierkels, CP (12 June 1948 – 29 June 1952)
- Martin Lucas, SVD (3 December 1952 – 1 January 1957)
- James Robert Knox (14 February 1957 – 13 April 1967)

Apostolic Pro-Nuncios

- Giuseppe Caprio (22 August 1967 – 19 April 1969)
- Marie-Joseph Lemieux, OP (30 May 1969 – 16 February 1971)
- John Gordon (11 August 1971 – 11 June 1976)
- Luciano Storero (14 July 1976 – 2 February 1981)
- Agostino Cacciavillan (9 May 1981 – 13 June 1990)
- Giorgio Zur (13 August 1990 – 7 December 1998)

Apostolic Nuncios

- Lorenzo Baldisseri (19 June 1999 – 12 November 2002)
- Pedro López Quintana (8 February 2003 – 10 December 2009)
- Salvatore Pennacchio (8 May 2010 – 6 August 2016)
- Giambattista Diquattro (21 January 2017 – 29 August 2020)
- Leopoldo Girelli (13 March 2021 – 13 March 2026)
- Waldemar Stanisław Sommertag (14 November 2026 – present)

== See also ==
- Holy See–India relations
- List of diplomatic missions in India
