= Henry Edmund Donnelly =

American Catholic bishop

Most Reverend Henry E. Donnelly
- Auxiliary Bishop of Detroit
- Church: Catholic Church
- See: Titular See of Tymbrias
- Appointed: September 6, 1954
- In office: October 26, 1954 - November 4, 1967

Orders
- Ordination: August 17, 1930 by Michael Gallagher (bishop)
- Consecration: June 13, 1968 by Edward Mooney

Personal details
- Born: August 28, 1904 Hudson, Michigan
- Died: November 4, 1967 (aged 63) Detroit, Michigan

Henry Edmund Donnelly (August 28, 1904 – November 4, 1967) was an American prelate of the Roman Catholic Church in the United States. He served as an auxiliary bishop of the Archdiocese of Detroit in Michigan from 1954 to 1967.

== Biography ==
=== Early life ===
Henry Donnelly was born on August 28, 1904 in Hudson, Michigan. He was ordained a priest for the Archdiocese of Detroit in Hudson by Bishop Michael James Gallagher on August 17, 1930.

=== Auxiliary Bishop of Detroit ===
On September 6, 1954 Pope Pius XII appointed Donnelly as titular bishop of Tymbrias and auxiliary bishop of Detroit. He was consecrated a bishop at the Cathedral of the Most Blessed Sacrament in Detroit by Cardinal Edward Mooney on October 26, 1954. The principal co-consecrators were Bishop Allen Babcock of Grand Rapids and Detroit auxiliary bishop Alexander M. Zaleski.

Donnelly died in Detroit on November 4, 1967, at age 63.
