= John Gordon (nuncio) =

Irish Roman Catholic archbishop and diplomat

- Apostolic Nuncio to Netherlands
- Church: Roman Catholic
- See: Titular Archbishop of Nicopolis ad Nestum

Orders
- Ordination: 7 March 1936
- Consecration: 24 June 1962 by Amleto Giovanni Cicognani

Personal details
- Born: 25 July 1912 Clarecastle, County Clare, Ireland
- Died: 30 January 1981 (aged 68)

John Gordon (25 July 1912 – 30 January 1981) was an Irish Roman Catholic archbishop and diplomat of the Holy See.

== Biography ==
Gordon was born at Clarecastle, County Clare and ordained to the priesthood on 7 March 1936.

On 10 February 1962, Pope John XXIII appointed him Apostolic Delegate to Thailand and the Malacca Peninsula, as well as Titular Archbishop of Nicopolis ad Nestum.

His episcopal consecration took place on 24 June 1962. The principal consecrator was cardinal Amleto Giovanni Cicognani, and the co-consecrators were Archbishop Leone Giovanni Battista Nigris and Bishop Patrick Joseph Dunne.

Pope Paul VI appointed him Apostolic Delegate to Northern Africa on 27 February 1965.

On 14 July 1967, Pope Paul named him Apostolic Pro-Nuncio to Lesotho and on 16 July 1967 Apostolic Delegate to Southern Africa.

On 11 August 1971, he was named Apostolic Pro-Nuncio to India.

On 11 June 1976 he was named Apostolic Pro-Nuncio to the Netherlands.

Diplomatic posts
Preceded by Marie-Joseph Lemieux, OP	Apostolic Nuncio to India; 11 August 1971 – 11 June 1976	Succeeded by Luciano Storero
