= Dhirajlal Desai =

Indian diplomat and independence activist

1st Ambassador of India to Switzerland
- In office 17 December 1948 – 21 March 1951
- Prime Minister: Jawaharlal Nehru
- Succeeded by: Asaf Ali

1st Ambassadors to the Holy See
- In office 1949–1951
- Prime Minister: Jawaharlal Nehru
- Succeeded by: Nedyan Raghaven

President of the Bombay Provincial Congress Committee
- In office 1941

Personal details
- Born: Dhirajlal Bhulabhai Desai; 22 June 1908 Bombay, British India
- Died: 21 March 1951 (aged 42)
- Spouse: Madhuriben Desai
- Occupation: Diplomat, Activist, Barrister

Dhirajlal B. Desai (22 June 1908 – 21 March 1951), popularly known as Dhirubhai, was an Indian diplomat and independence activist. He served as India's first ambassador and plenipotentiary minister to Switzerland. He also served as the President of the Bombay Provincial Congress Committee (BPCC) in 1941. He was born in Bombay, British India and was the son of lawyer and leader, Bhulabhai Desai.

== Life and work ==
He attended Elphinstone College, Bharda New High School and Government Law College in Bombay. Desai was Barrister at the Supreme Court of India and Chairman of the Indian National Congress in the Bombay Presidency. He was a director of Ameer Trading Corporation, the Indian branch of American Cyanamid's Calco Chemical Company.

Desai served as India's first Ambassador to Switzerland from 17 December 1948 to 21 March 1951. He was elected as the President of the Bombay Provincial Congress Committee (BPCC) in 1941. He was known for his speeches and oratory skills, particularly during the Quit India movement. He was a strong advocate for freedom and self-reliance and often spoke out against the British Empire's attitude towards the Congress party and its denial of the right to free speech.

Desai delivered speeches at various venues in Bombay, including Dana Bunder and Ghodapdev, and often spoke to working-class audiences, encouraging them to spin charkha for at least half an hour a day as a means of earning a small income and becoming self-reliant.

From 17 December 1948, he was accredited as an envoy in Bern and also to the Holy See and to the Allied Commission for Austria in Vienna.

Dhirajlal Desai died of heart attack on 21 March 1951 in Bern at the age of 42.

Political offices
Preceded by Position established	Indian Ambassador to Switzerland; 1948–1951	Succeeded by Asaf Ali
