= Michael Gallagher (bishop) =

American bishop (1866–1937)

His Excellency, The Most Reverend Michael Gallagher
- Bishop of Detroit
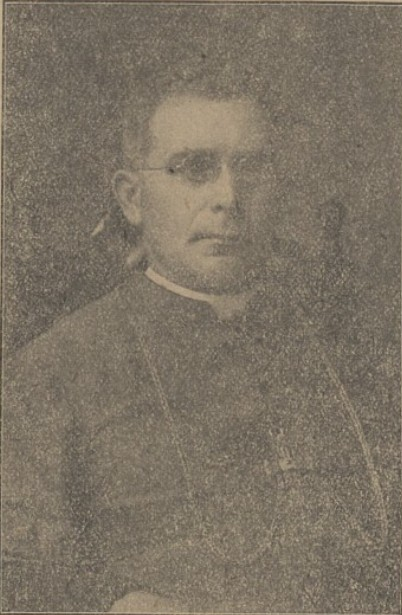
- See: Diocese of Detroit
- In office: November 17, 1918 – January 20, 1937
- Predecessor: John Samuel Foley
- Successor: Edward Aloysius Mooney
- Other posts: Bishop of Grand Rapids; 1915 - 1918

Orders
- Ordination: March 19, 1893 by Simon Aichner
- Consecration: September 8, 1915 by Henry Richter

Personal details
- Born: November 18, 1866 Auburn, Michigan, US
- Died: January 20, 1937 (age 70) Detroit, Michigan, US
- Denomination: Catholic Church
- Education: Mungret College; University of Innsbruck

Michael James Gallagher (November 16, 1866 – January 20, 1937) was an American prelate of the Roman Catholic Church. He served as bishop of the Diocese of Detroit in Michigan from 1918 until his death in 1937. He also served as coadjutor bishop and bishop of the Diocese of Grand Rapids in Michigan from 1915 to 1918.

Styles of Michael James Gallagher
- Reference style: The Most Reverend
- Spoken style: Your Excellency
- Religious style: Bishop
- Posthumous style: not applicable

== Biography ==
=== Early life ===
Michael Gallagher was born on November 16, 1866, in Auburn, Michigan. Gallagher attended public schools there and then went to St. James Parish school in Bay City, Michigan. He studied at Assumption College in Sandwich, Ontario, then went to Mungret College in Limerick, Ireland. Gallagher finished his preparation for the priesthood at the University of Innsbruck in Innsbruck, Austria.

Gallagher was ordained a priest in Innsbruck by Archbishop Simon Aichner for the Diocese of Grand Rapids on March 19, 1893.

=== Coadjutor Bishop and Bishop of Grand Rapids ===
On July 5, 1915, Gallagher was appointed titular bishop of Tipasa and coadjutor of Grand Rapids by Pope Benedict XV. He was consecrated on September 8, 1915, by Bishop Henry Richter.

On December 26, 1916, after the death of Bishop Richter, Gallagher automatically became the new bishop of Grand Rapids.

=== Bishop of Detroit ===
On July 18, 1918, Gallagher was appointed bishop of the Diocese of Detroit. He was installed on November 17, 1918. In 1919, Gallagher opened Sacred Heart Seminary in a temporary structure in Detroit to alleviate a shortage of priests. After a $4 million fundraising effort over the next four years, a permanent facility with a capacity for 500 seminarians was opened in 1924.

In 1926, Gallagher appointed Charles Coughlin as parish priest in Royal Oak, Michigan. Coughlin soon started a radio ministry with Gallagher's approval. Some of the proceeds from his show went to build the National Shrine of the Little Flower in Royal Oak. As Coughlin started getting national coverage for his program, his incendiary antisemitic comments became more pronounced. In 1930, the apostolic delegate for the United States, Cardinal Pietro Fumasoni Biondi, asked Gallagher to curb Coughlin, but the bishop refused. "I made no mistake and have never doubted my judgment in putting him before the microphone," Gallagher said of Coughlin in 1933.

Again in 1935, Apostolic Delegate Amleto Cigognani tried to stop Coughlin, but Gallagher still protected him. It was rumored that Pope Pius XI refused to raise Detroit to an archdiocese due to his displeasure over Coughlin. In August 1936, Gallagher went to Rome on a routine visit to the Vatican. While he was en route, Coughlin denounced President Franklin Roosevelt as a liar. Gallagher then expressed his public displeasure at Coughlin's choice of words, forcing him to apologize. While meeting with the pope, Coughlin's activities came up for discussion. Gallagher succeeded in convincing the pope that Coughlin should not be censured or forced to quit broadcasting.

The Fisher Brothers of the firm Fisher Body in Detroit commissioned the Boston firm of McGinnis and Walsh, specialists in ecclesiastical architecture, to design a residence for Bishop Gallagher. The 39,000-square-foot (3,600 m^{2}) home, paid for by the Fishers, is the largest within the city of Detroit.

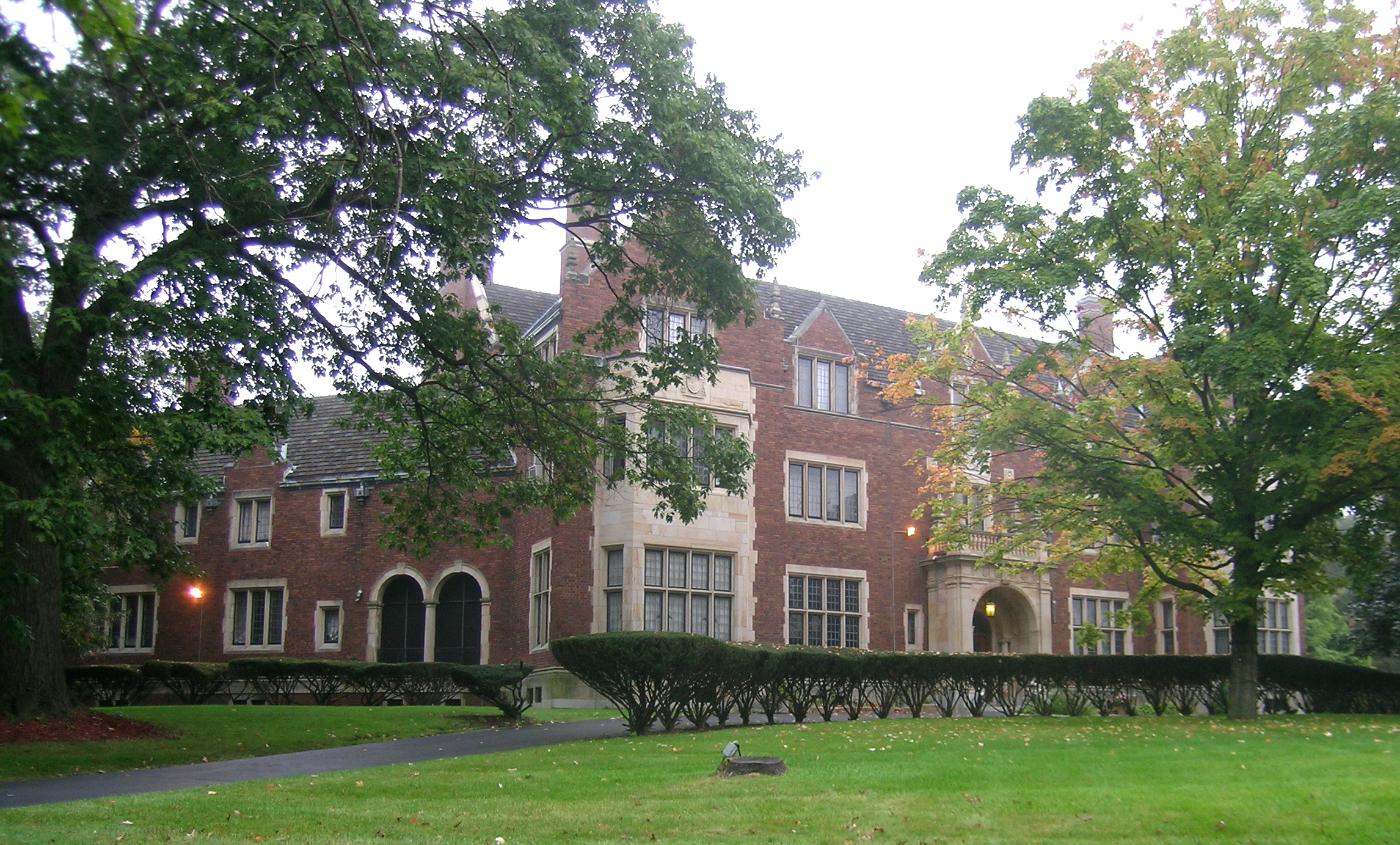
Bishop Gallagher House in Detroit's Palmer Woods Historic District

The two-story brick residence had a large central structure flanked by diagonal wings. Religious themes are included throughout the house, both on the exterior and the interior. On the exterior, medallions, shields and crests are set into the brickwork, and a copper statue of the St. Michael the Archangel defeating Satan is prominent. The interior is finished with oak, stone and masonry. The house had, at one time, the largest collection of Pewabic glazed pottery tile in Michigan.

Gallagher lived in this home until his death in 1937; subsequent archbishops of Detroit Edward Mooney and John Francis Dearden also lived in the home.

=== Death and legacy ===
Gallagher died at Providence Hospital in Detroit on January 20, 1937, at age 70. The Tower of the Crucifixion at the Shrine of the Little Flower has Gallagher's face on the sculpture of the Archangel Michael. Bishop Gallagher High School in Harper Woods, Michigan, was named after him.

== See also ==
- Archdiocese of Detroit

Catholic Church titles
Preceded by Henry Richter	Bishop of Grand Rapids; 1916–1918	Succeeded by Edward D. Kelly
Preceded by John Samuel Foley	Bishop of Detroit; 1918–1937	Succeeded by Edward Mooney
