= Marie-Joseph Lemieux =

Canadian archbishop (1902–1994)

His Excellency Marie-Joseph Lemieux
- Apostolic Nuncio Emeritus to India
- See: Titular Archbishop of Saldae

Orders
- Ordination: 15 April 1928 by Felix-Raymond-Marie Rouleau
- Consecration: 29 Jun 1936 by Paolo Marella

Personal details
- Born: 10 May 1902 Quebec, Canada
- Died: 4 March 1994 (aged 91) Ottawa, Ontario, Canada
- Motto: In Caritate Christi

Marie-Joseph Lemieux (10 May 1902 – 4 March 1994) was a Catholic archbishop and diplomat of the Holy See.

== Biography ==
Marie-Joseph Lemieux joined the Dominican Order, and professed his vows on 4 August 1924. He studied in Rome, Lille and Oxford and was ordained a priest on 15 April 1928 in Ottawa by Cardinal Felix-Raymond-Marie Rouleau and was then sent on a mission to Japan.

On his appointment as Bishop of Hakodate, later diocese of Sendai (Japan) on 9 December 1935, he was then the youngest bishop in the history of the Roman Catholic Church. On 29 June 1936 he was consecrated by Cardinal Paolo Marella and the co-consecrators Archbishop Jean-Baptiste-Alix Chambon, MEP (Archdiocese of Tokyo) and Bishop Januarius Hayasaka Kyunosuke (Archdiocese of Nagasaki). In 1941, he was forced to leave Japan for political reasons, he returned to Canada on 16 January 1941 and was appointed Titular Bishop of Calydon. On 26 November 1942 he received the appointment as Apostolic Administrator of the erstwhile Diocese of Gravelbourg in Saskatchewan, Canada. He was appointed Bishop of Gravelbourg on 15 April 1944 and the inauguration was on 28 May 1944.

This was followed on 20 July 1953 by his appointment as Archbishop and Metropolitan of Ottawa, on 17 September 1953 he was officially inaugurated to his new office. On 16 September 1966, he retired from the office of archbishop of Ottawa and became the titular archbishop of Saldae. From 1966-1968 he was Apostolic Nuncio in Haiti and then in 1969 simultaneously the Apostolic Delegate to the Antilles. On 30 May 1969, he was appointed Apostolic Pro-Nuncio in India. On 16 February 1971, he resigned.

Archbishop Lemieux was a participant in all sessions of the Second Vatican Council and was consultant to the "Preparatory Commission for the bishops and dioceses."

Academic offices
Preceded by Alexandre Vachon	Chancellor of the University of Ottawa; 1953–1965	Succeeded by Pauline Vanier
Diplomatic posts
Preceded by Giovanni Ferrofino	Apostolic Nuncio to Haiti; 16 September 1966 – 30 May 1969	Succeeded by Luigi Barbarito
Preceded by Giuseppe Caprio	Apostolic Nuncio to India; 30 May 1969 – 16 February 1971	Succeeded by John Gordon
