= Monika Kapil Mohta =

Indian diplomat

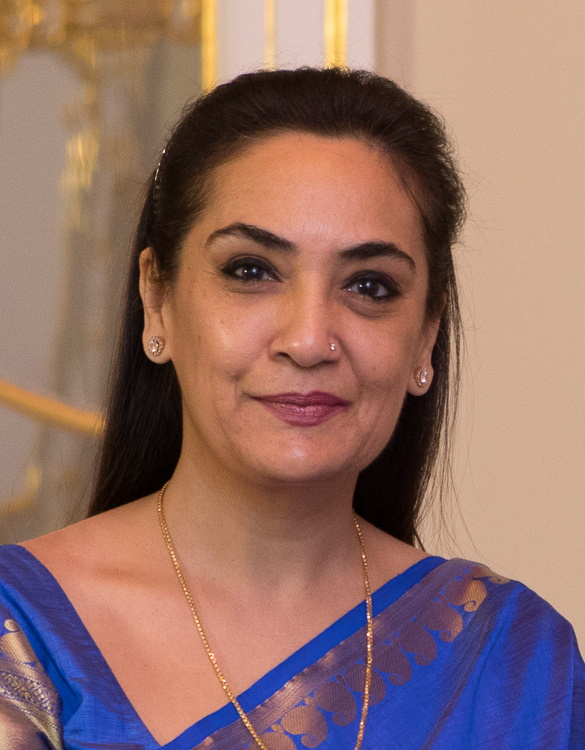

Indian Ambassador to Switzerland
- In office 5 August 2020 – 31 January 2022
- Preceded by: Sibi George
- Succeeded by: Sanjay Bhattacharyya

Indian Ambassador to Sweden and Latvia
- In office November 2016 – August 2020

Indian Ambassador to Poland and Lithuania
- In office July 2011 – January 2015

Personal details
- Born: 19 January 1962 (age 64) New Delhi
- Spouse: Dr. Madhup Mohta
- Children: Siddhaant Mohta, Sanskriti Mohta
- Parent(s): Jai Singh Kapil, Ved Kapil
- Education: St. Stephen’s College, Delhi; Delhi University
- Occupation: IFS
- Profession: Civil Servant

Monika Kapil Mohta (born 19 January 1962) is a diplomat of the Indian Foreign Service, who served as the Ambassador of India to Switzerland since August 2020. She holds the rank of Secretary in the Ministry of External Affairs and was previously the Ambassador of India to Sweden and Latvia (2016 - 2020) and the Ambassador of India to Poland and Lithuania (2011 - 2016).

== Early life and education ==
Mohta was born in New Delhi to Jai Singh Kapil and Ved Kapil. After completing her schooling from The Air Force School, she graduated from St. Stephen's College, Delhi University with a bachelor's and masters's degrees. She joined the Indian Foreign Service in 1985.

== Career ==
Mohta served as Joint Secretary and Additional Secretary (South) in the Ministry of External Affairs in New Delhi, and looked after India's relations with a large part of the Asia-Pacific region. She was charged with all political and bilateral matters relating to Australia, Brunei, Cambodia, East Timor, Fiji, Indonesia, Laos, Malaysia, New Zealand, Papua New Guinea, Philippines, Singapore, Thailand, Vietnam and all Pacific Island countries. She also headed the division in the Foreign Ministry charged with looking after work relating to the development of the new Nalanda University. She was Deputy Dean of the Indian Foreign Service Institute.

She was Ambassador of India to Poland and Lithuania from July 2011 to January 2015 and the Ambassador of India to Sweden and Latvia from November 2016 to July 2020. She served as the Director of The Nehru Centre and Minister (Culture) at the High Commission of India to the United Kingdom from 2006 to 2011, looking after cultural and community affairs for India in the UK. Prior to that she was the Deputy Director General of the Indian Council for Cultural Relations (ICCR) from 2005 to 2006. At the Ministry of External Affairs, she has served as Director and Joint Secretary (Pakistan), Director (Gulf), Director (External Publicity), Deputy Spokesperson, Director (United Nations Political), Officer on Special Duty (Press Relations), Under Secretary (Foreign Service Institute) and Under Secretary (Southern Africa).

She has also served at Indian Embassies in France, Nepal and Thailand, and in the Permanent Delegation of India to UNESCO in Paris.

== Personal life ==
She is married to Madhup Mohta, a medical doctor, author and career diplomat. They have a son, Siddhaant, and a daughter, Sanskriti.
