= Asaf Ali =

Indian politician (1921–1988)

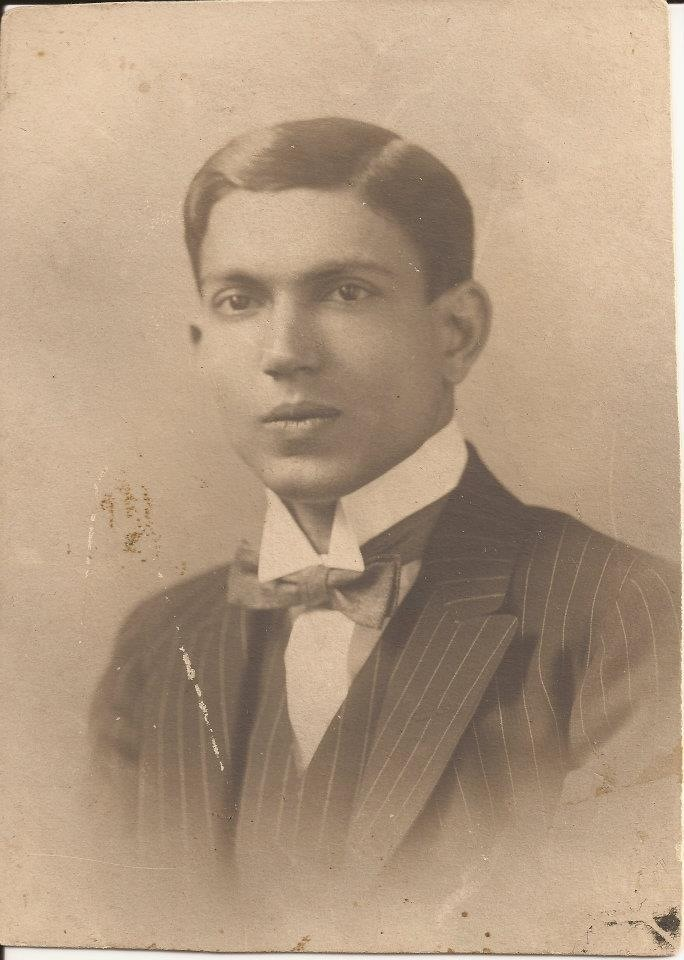
- Asaf Ali c. 1909

Ambassador of India to Switzerland
- In office 1952 – 2 April 1953
- Prime Minister: Jawaharlal Nehru
- Preceded by: Dhirajlal Bhulabhai Desai
- Succeeded by: Y. D. Gundevia

2nd Governor of Odisha
- In office 18 July 1951 – 6 June 1952
- Chief Minister: Nabakrushna Choudhuri
- Preceded by: V. P. Menon (acting)
- Succeeded by: Fazal Ali
- In office 21 June 1948 – 5 May 1951
- Chief Minister: Harekrushna Mahatab; Nabakrushna Choudhuri
- Preceded by: Kailash Nath Katju
- Succeeded by: V. P. Menon (acting)

1st Ambassador of India to the United States
- In office 1947–1948
- Prime Minister: Jawaharlal Nehru
- Preceded by: Office Established
- Succeeded by: Benegal Rama Rau

Personal details
- Born: 11 May 1888 Bijnor, North-Western Provinces, British India
- Died: 2 April 1953 (aged 64) Bern, Switzerland
- Spouse: Aruna Ganguly (m. 1928)
- Education: St. Stephen's College, Delhi
- Occupation: Lawyer, Activist

Asaf Ali (11 May 1888 – 2 April 1953) was an Indian independence activist and noted lawyer. He was the first Indian Ambassador to the United States. He also served as the Governor of Odisha. Asaf Ali was born on 11 May 1888 AD in Seohara town of Bijnor district in British India (now Uttar Pradesh, India).

== Education ==
Asaf Ali was educated at St. Stephen's College, Delhi. He was called to the Bar from Lincoln's Inn in England.

== Indian National Movement ==
In 1914, the British declaration of war against the Ottoman Empire had a large effect on the Indian Muslim community. Asaf Ali supported the Ottomans and resigned from the Privy Council. He saw this as an act of non-cooperation and returned to India in December 1914. Upon his return to India, Asaf Ali became heavily involved in the nationalist movement.

He defended Bhagat Singh and Batukeshwar Dutt, who was accused of throwing a bomb in the Central Legislative Assembly on April 8, 1929, during the passage of a controversial ordinance.

He was elected to the Central Legislative Assembly in 1935 as a member of the Muslim Nationalist Party. He then became significant as a Congress member and was appointed deputy leader.

The last of several spells of imprisonment which Asaf Ali courted during the freedom movement was in the wake of the 'Quit India' resolution adopted by the All India Congress Committee in August 1942. He was detained at Ahmednagar Fort jail along with Jawaharlal Nehru and other members of the Congress Working Committee.

== Post 1946 ==
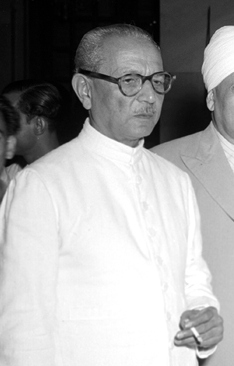
Ali in 1949

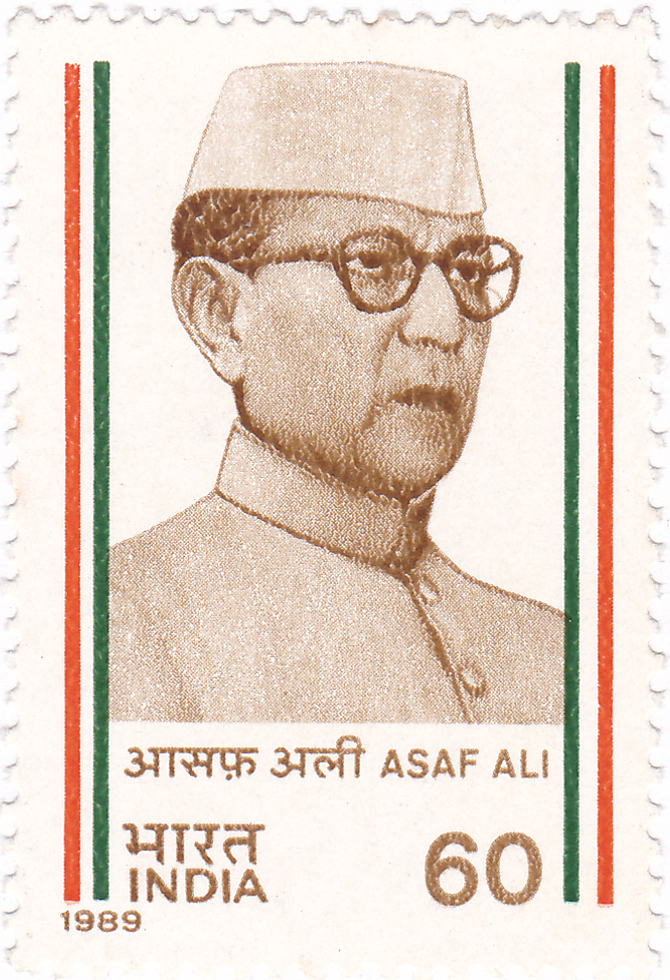
Ali on a 1989 stamp of India

He was in charge of the Railways and Transport in the Interim Government of India headed by Jawaharlal Nehru from 2 September 1946. He served as the first Indian Ambassador to the United States from February 1947 to mid-April 1947.

== Post independence ==
Asaf Ali was first Indian Ambassador to United States. He was appointed governor of Odisha for two terms and later, Indian Ambassador to Switzerland.

== Legal career ==
Asaf Ali rose to become one of the most respected lawyers in the country. He defended Batukeshwar Dutt as a lawyer.

In 1945, Ali came to be the convener of the INA defence team established by the Congress for the defense of the officers of the Indian National Army charged with treason later in November 1945.

Bhagat Singh was charged with attempt to murder under section 307 of the Indian Penal Code. Asaf Ali, a member of the Congress Party was his lawyer.

== Personal life ==
In 1928, he married Aruna Ganguly, a marriage that raised eyebrows on the grounds of religion (Asaf Ali was a Muslim while Aruna was a Hindu) and age difference (Aruna was 20 years junior to him). She is widely remembered for hoisting the Indian National Congress flag at the Gowalia Tank maidan in Bombay during the Quit India Movement, 1942. Later Aruna Asaf Ali was honored with India's highest civilian award, Bharat Ratna, for her work.

== Death and legacy ==
Ali died in office in Bern on 2 April 1953, while serving as India's ambassador to Switzerland. In 1989, India Post brought out a stamp in his honor.

Political offices
Preceded by None	Indian Ambassador to the United States; 1947–1948	Succeeded by Vijaya Lakshmi Pandit
