= Edward Aloysius Mooney =

American cardinal

His Eminence Edward Aloysius Mooney
- Cardinal, Archbishop of Detroit
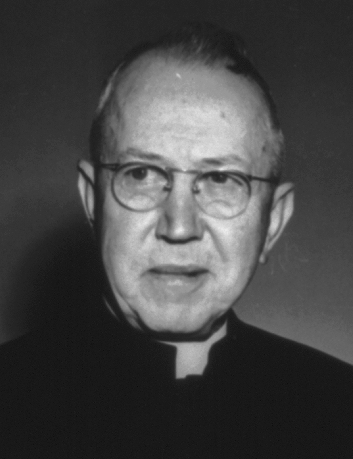
- Archdiocese: Detroit
- Installed: May 31, 1937
- Term ended: October 25, 1958
- Predecessor: Michael Gallagher
- Successor: John Dearden
- Other post: Cardinal-Priest of Santa Susanna
- Previous posts: Bishop of Rochester (1933–1937); Apostolic Delegate to Japan (1931 to 1933 ) Apostolic Delegate to the East Indies (1926 to 1931)

Orders
- Ordination: April 10, 1909 by Pietro Respighi
- Consecration: January 31, 1926 by Willem van Rossum
- Created cardinal: February 18, 1946 by Pius XII
- Rank: Cardinal priest

Personal details
- Born: May 9, 1882 Mount Savage, Maryland, US
- Died: October 25, 1958 (aged 76) Rome, Italy
- Motto: Domino servientes (Serving the Lord)

Styles of Edward Aloysius Mooney
- Reference style: His Eminence
- Spoken style: Your Eminence
- Informal style: Cardinal
- See: Detroit

Ordination history of Edward Aloysius Mooney
History
Episcopal consecration
- Consecrated by: Willem Marinus van Rossum
- Date: January 31, 1926
Episcopal succession
Bishops consecrated by Edward Aloysius Mooney as principal consecrator
- Pierre-Guillaume Marque: February 11, 1930
- Walter Andrew Foery: August 18, 1937
- Stephen Stanislaus Woznicki: January 25, 1938
- William Francis Murphy: February 26, 1938
- Thomas Lawrence Noa: March 19, 1946
- Allen James Babcock: March 25, 1947
- Alexander Mieceslaus Zaleski: May 23, 1950
- Adolph Gregory Schmitt: April 2, 1951
- John Anthony Donovan: October 26, 1954
- Henry Edmund Donnelly: October 26, 1954

Edward Aloysius Mooney (May 9, 1882 – October 25, 1958) was an American Catholic prelate who served as archbishop of Detroit in Michigan from 1937 until his death in 1958. The Vatican made him a cardinal in 1946.

Mooney previously served as an apostolic delegate to British India and later Japan. He served as bishop of Rochester in New York State from 1933 to 1937.

== Early life ==
Edward Mooney was born on May 9, 1882, in Mount Savage, Maryland, the seventh child of Thomas and Sarah (née Heneghan) Mooney. When he was five years old, the family moved to Youngstown, Ohio, where Thomas Mooney worked at a tube mill. Following his father's death in the 1890s, Sarah Mooney opened a small bakery to support the family, with Edward Mooney and his siblings delivering the baked goods to her customers.

Having decided to become a priest, Mooney first attended St. Charles College, a minor seminary in Ellicott City, Maryland. He then entered St. Mary's Seminary, the major seminary in Baltimore. Mooney was sent to Rome in 1905 to study, residing at the Pontifical North American College.

== Priesthood ==
Mooney was ordained to the priesthood for the Diocese of Cleveland by Cardinal Pietro Respighi in Rome on April 10, 1909.

After Mooney returned to the United States, the diocese assigned him to teach dogmatic theology at St. Mary's Seminary, the minor seminary in Wickliffe, Ohio. In 1916, he was named as the founding principal of the Cathedral Latin School in Cleveland. Mooney left Cathedral in 1922 to serve as pastor of St. Patrick Parish in Youngstown, Ohio.

Mooney went back to Rome in 1923 to serve as spiritual director of the North American College. Cardinal Albert Meyer, an alumnus of the college, once remarked,

"[Mooney] was revered and greatly beloved ... he left an indelible mark on all the students, inspiring them with his great learning and his solid spiritual guidance."

The Vatican raised Mooney to the rank of chaplain of his holiness in 1925.

== Episcopal career ==
=== Apostolic delegate ===
==== East Indies ====
On January 21, 1926, after having made a favorable impression on Cardinal Gasparri, Mooney was appointed apostolic delegate to the East Indies and titular archbishop of Irenopolis in Isauria by Pope Pius XI. He received his episcopal consecration at the chapel of the North American College on January 31, 1926. Cardinal Willem van Rossum was the principal consecrator, with Archbishop Francesco Marchetti Selvaggiani and Bishop Giulio Serafini serving as co-consecrators.

As apostolic delegate, Mooney was headquartered in Bangalore, then part of the princely state of Mysore. He founded 15 missions and three dioceses in British India and negotiated a reconciliation between the Vatican and the Syro-Malankara Church there.

==== Japan ====
Mooney was named apostolic delegate to Japan by Pius XI on March 30, 1931. During this period, the Japanese Government forced all of its citizens to pay homage at Shinto shrines. However, Catholics objected to being forced to participate in Shinto religious ceremonies. To resolve this conflict Mooney lobbied the Japanese Government to declare that shrine visits were of a non-religious patriotic nature. He later presided over a plenary council of Korean bishops.

=== Bishop of Rochester ===
On August 28, 1933, Pius XI appointed Mooney as bishop of Rochester, with the personal title of "archbishop". During his tenure in Rochester, he promoted Catholic Action and the Knights of Peter Claver as a means of outreach to the African American community, and took deep interest in Catholic social teaching and labor relations.

Mooney was elected chair in 1935 of the National Catholic Welfare Conference, maintaining that post until 1945.

=== Archbishop of Detroit ===
Mooney was named the first archbishop of Detroit on May 31, 1937. Arriving by train in Detroit on August 2nd, he was greeted by Michigan Governor Frank Murphy and a representative of Detroit Mayor Frank Couzens, along with a large crowd.

Mooney soon became engaged in a contentious relationship with Reverend Charles Coughlin, a priest in the archdiocese. A popular radio broadcaster who reached millions of listeners across the country, Coughlin's antisemitic tirades and fierce attacks against US President Franklin Roosevelt angered many in the Catholic hierarchy and American public. In October 1937, Mooney publicly rebuked Coughlin for calling Roosevelt stupid over his nomination of Senator Hugo Black to the US Supreme Court. This reprimand from Mooney led Coughlin to cancel his contract for 26 radio broadcasts. In a January 1939 meeting of all the archdiocesan priests, Mooney proposed the establishment of labor schools in the parishes to help "Christian workers to train themselves in principle and technique to assume the leadership in the unions which their numbers justify".

An avid golfer, Mooney once remarked to his priests "If your score is over 100, you are neglecting your golf—if it falls below 90, you're neglecting your parish". Every year, he would take a group of altar boys to the opening game of the baseball season.

During World War II, Mooney staunchly opposed Nazi Germany and its fascist allies. In an August 1942 meeting in Washington D.C. of North and South American prelates, he warned, "A victory in this war for the forces of Nazi-inspired aggression would drive Christians underground for generations in the conquered countries."

In October 1942, the US Department of Justice was planning to indict Coughlin on charges of sedition. As part of a deal to avoid Coughlin's prosecution, Mooney ordered him to end his political activities and work solely as a parish priest. Commenting on his order, Mooney stated, "My understanding with him is sufficiently broad and firm to exclude effectively the recurrence of any such unpleasant situation." Pope Pius XII created Mooney as cardinal priest of the Church of Santa Susanna in Rome during the consistory of February 18, 1946.

As the northern suburbs of Detroit grew after the end of World War II in 1945, Mooney added churches in the remote areas of Oakland County. In 1948, he appointed Reverend Frederick Delaney to begin opening additional parishes in the rural areas of the county. In 1957, Mooney delivered the benediction in Washington at the second term inauguration ceremony of US President Dwight D. Eisenhower.

== Death and legacy ==
Mooney died in Rome on October 25, 1958, at age 76, after suffering from a heart attack and collapsing less than three hours before the beginning of the 1958 papal conclave. Cardinals Francis Spellman and James McIntyre rushed to his deathbed to grant him absolution.

Mooney was initially buried in the crypt of St. John's Provincial Seminary in Plymouth, Michigan. However, his remains were transferred in 1988 to Holy Sepulchre Cemetery in Southfield, Michigan. Several schools have been named after Mooney:

- Cardinal Mooney High School in Youngstown, Ohio, founded in 1956
- Cardinal Mooney High School in Greece, New York, founded in 1962, closed in 1989
- Cardinal Mooney High School in Sarasota, Florida, founded in 1959
- Cardinal Mooney High School in Marine City, Michigan, founded in 1977

Catholic Church titles
Preceded by Pietro Pisani	Apostolic Delegate to the East Indies; 18 January 1926 – 30 March 1931	Succeeded by Leo Peter Kierkels
Preceded by John Francis O'Hern	Bishop of Rochester; 1933–1937	Succeeded by James E. Kearney
Preceded by Michael Gallagher	Archbishop of Detroit; 1937–1958	Succeeded by John Francis Dearden
