= Pietro Pisani =

Catholic archbishop and diplomat

- Apostolic Delegate Emeritus to India
- See: Titular Archbishop of Constantia in Scythia

Orders
- Consecration: 21 December 1919 by Willem Marinus van Rossum

Personal details
- Born: 15 July 1871 Vercelli, Italy
- Died: 16 February 1960 (aged 88)

Pietro Pisani (1871–1960) was a Catholic archbishop and diplomat of the Holy See.

== Biography ==
Pisani was born in Vercelli in Italy on 15 July 1871. He was appointed Apostolic Delegate to India and Titular Archbishop of Constantia in Scythia on 15 December 1919. On 21 December 1919, he was ordained a bishop by Cardinal Willem Marinus van Rossum, while the co-consecrators were Archbishop Giovanni Gamberoni, Archbishop of Vercelli and Bishop Giacomo Sinibaldi, Titular Bishop of Tiberias. He resigned as Apostolic Delegate in October 1924 and died on 16 February 1960.

Diplomatic posts
Preceded by Pietro Fumasoni Biondi	Apostolic Nuncio to India; 15 December 1919 – October 1924	Succeeded by Edward Aloysius Mooney
