= Pietro Fumasoni Biondi =

Italian cardinal (1872–1960)

His Eminence Pietro Fumasoni Biondi
- Prefect of the Congregation for the Propagation of the Faith
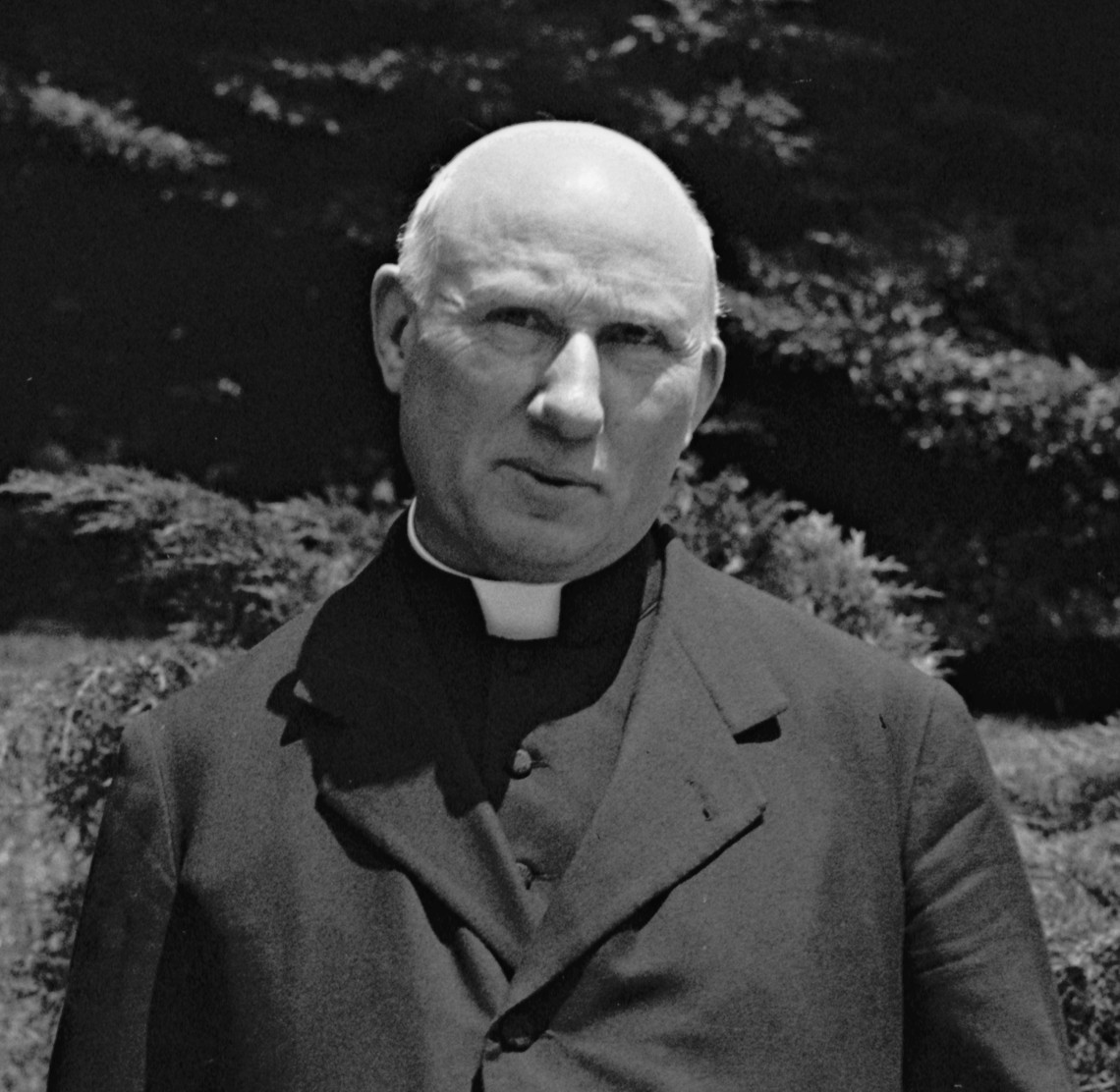
- Biondi in 1929
- Church: Roman Catholic Church
- Appointed: 16 March 1933
- Term ended: 12 July 1960
- Predecessor: Willem Marinus van Rossum
- Successor: Gregorio Pietro Agagianian
- Other post: Cardinal-Priest of Santa Croce in Gerusalemme (1933–60)
- Previous posts: Titular Archbishop of Doclea (1916–33); Apostolic Delegate to East India (1916–19); Apostolic Delegate to Japan (1919–21); Secretary of the Congregation for the Propagation of the Faith (1921–22); Apostolic Delegate to the United States of America (1922–33)

Orders
- Ordination: 17 April 1897 by Lucido Maria Parocchi
- Consecration: 10 December 1916 by Domenico Serafini
- Created cardinal: 13 March 1933 by Pope Pius XI
- Rank: Cardinal-Priest

Personal details
- Born: Pietro Fumasoni Biondi; 4 September 1872 Rome, Kingdom of Italy
- Died: 12 July 1960 (aged 87) Rome, Italy
- Buried: Campo Verano
- Parents: Filippo Fumasoni Biondi; Gertrude Roselli
- Education: Pontifical Roman Major Seminary

Styles of Pietro Fumasoni Biondi
- Reference style: His Eminence
- Spoken style: Your Eminence
- Religious style: Cardinal
- Informal style: Cardinal
- See: none

Pietro Fumasoni Biondi (4 September 1872 – 12 July 1960) was an Italian prelate of the Catholic Church who served as prefect of the Sacred Congregation for the Propagation of the Faith in the Roman Curia from 1933 until his death in 1960. He was elevated to the cardinalate in 1933.

== Biography ==
Fumasoni Biondi was born on 4 September 1872, in Rome to aristocrats Filippo and Gertrude (née Roselli) Fumasoni Biondi; he had a sister who entered the Missionary Sisters of the Sacred Heart of Jesus and became known as Mother Gertrude. After studying at the Pontifical Roman Major Seminary, he was ordained to the priesthood by Cardinal Lucido Parocchi on 17 April 1897. From 1897 to 1916, he was a professor at the Pontifical Urbaniana University and then an official of the Sacred Congregation for the Propagation of the Faith.

On 14 November 1916, Biondi was appointed Apostolic Delegate to the East Indies and Titular Archbishop of Dioclea. He received his episcopal consecration on the following 10 December from Cardinal Domenico Serafini, OSB, with Bishops Joseph Legrand, CSC, and Agostino Zampini, OSA, serving as co-consecrators, in the chapel of the Urbaniana University. In this post, he actively tried to improve relations between the Vatican and the Emperor of Japan. Biondi was later named Apostolic Delegate to Japan on 6 December 1919, Secretary of the Congregation for the Propagation of the Faith on 14 June 1921 and Apostolic Delegate to the United States on 14 December 1922. In 1927, he declared the Vatican had no interest in the presidential campaign of Al Smith, the Catholic governor of New York.

Pope Pius XI created him Cardinal-Priest of Santa Croce in Gerusalemme in the consistory of 13 March 1933, in advance for his appointment as Prefect of the Sacred Congregation for the Propagation of the Faith three days later, on 16 March. Cardinal Fumasoni Bondi served as papal legate to the National Eucharistic Congress in Teramo on 20 August 1935. He was one of the cardinal electors who participated in the 1939 papal conclave, and again in the conclave of 1958.

Biondi died on 13 July 1960, aged 87, in Rome, and was buried in the Campo Verano.

Catholic Church titles
| Preceded by Willem van Rossum | Prefect of the Sacred Congregation for the Propagation of the Faith; 1933–1960 | Succeeded by Samuel Stritch as Pro-Prefect; Grégoire-Pierre Agagianian as Prefect |
| Preceded by Giovanni Bonzano | Apostolic Delegate to the United States; 1922–1933 | Succeeded by Amleto Giovanni Cicognani |
| Preceded by Camillo Laurenti | Secretary of the Sacred Congregation for the Propagation of the Faith; 1921–1922 | Succeeded by Francesco Marchetti-Selvaggiani |
| Preceded by none | Apostolic Delegate to Japan; 1919–1921 | Succeeded by Mario Giardini, B |
| Preceded by Ladislao Zaleski | Apostolic Delegate to the East Indies; 1916–1919 | Succeeded by Pietro Pisani |
