= M. K. Lokesh =

Indian civil servant

Indian ambassador to United Arab Emirates
- In office 11-04-2010 – 17-12-2013
- Preceded by: Talmiz Ahmad
- Succeeded by: T.P. Seetharam

Personal details
- Occupation: Civil servant IFS

M. K. Lokesh is an Indian Civil servant and was the Indian ambassador to United Arab Emirates.

== Positions held ==
- Ambassador to Switzerland.

== Indian Foreign Service ==
He is a 1977 batch officer of the Indian Foreign Service.
