= Sibi George =

Indian civil servant (born 1967)

Sibi George IFS
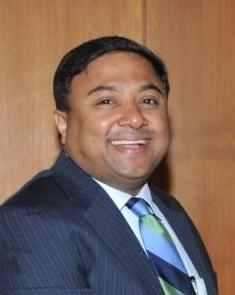

Secretary (West), Ministry of External Affairs
- Incumbent
- Assumed office 1 September 2025
- Prime Minister: Narendra Modi
- Minister: Subrahmanyam Jaishankar
- Preceded by: Tanmaya Lal

Ambassador of India to Japan
- In office 1 November 2022 – 31 August 2025
- Prime Minister: Narendra Modi
- Preceded by: Sanjay Kumar Verma
- Succeeded by: Nagma Mallick

Ambassador of India to Kuwait
- In office 1 August 2020 – 31 October 2022
- Prime Minister: Narendra Modi
- Preceded by: K Jeeva Sagar
- Succeeded by: Dr Adarsh Swaika

Ambassador of India to Switzerland, the Holy See and Liechtenstein
- In office November 2017 – August 2020
- Preceded by: Smitha Purushotham
- Succeeded by: Monika Kapil Mohta

Personal details
- Born: 20 May 1967 (age 59) Pala, Kottayam, Kerala, India
- Spouse: Joice Sibi
- Education: Master of Arts (Political Science)
- Alma mater: St. Thomas College, Palai
- Occupation: IFS
- Profession: Civil Servant
- Awards: S.K. Singh Award, 2014
- Rank: Secretary

Sibi George (born 20 May 1967) is an Indian diplomat from the 1993 batch of the Indian Foreign Service who now serves as the Secretary (West) in Ministry of External Affairs, India since 2025. Previously, he has served as the Ambassador of India to Japan. He has previously served as Ambassador of India to Kuwait, Switzerland, the Holy See (Vatican City), as well as the Principality of Liechtenstein. He joined the Indian Foreign Service in 1993.

In 2014, the Government of India conferred on him the S.K. Singh Award for Excellence in Indian Foreign Service. This award was conferred upon him during his post as Deputy Chief of Mission to Riyadh, Saudi Arabia.

== Early life and education ==
George was born in Pala, Kerala. He is a gold medallist graduate of St. Thomas College, Palai and has a Master of Arts in Political Science. He also holds a diploma in Arabic from The American University in Cairo.

== Career ==
Joining the Indian Foreign Service in 1993, George began his diplomatic career in Cairo where he served in the Mission as Political Officer. Subsequently he moved to the Indian Embassy in Doha, Qatar where he handled Consular, Community, Information and Media affairs as First Secretary. Later he served as Political Counsellor in Indian High Commission in Islamabad, Pakistan and as Political Counsellor and Commercial Counsellor at Indian Embassy in Washington DC. He also served as Deputy Chief of Mission in Indian Missions in Tehran, Iran and Riyadh, Saudi Arabia.

At headquarters of Ministry of External Affairs in New Delhi, he served in East Asia Division and also as coordinator of India–Africa Forum Summit. He later headed Administration, Establishment and Welfare Divisions in the Ministry of External Affairs.

He was accredited as the Ambassador of India to Switzerland, the Holy See (Vatican City) and the Principality of Liechtenstein in November, 2017 and Kuwait in 2020. During his post, he handled the high profile visits of Prime Minister Narendra Modi in January 2018, who visited Switzerland to deliver the keynote address at the World Economic Forum's Annual Meeting 2018 in Davos and the recent state visit of President Ram Nath Kovind to Switzerland. The President also attended an Indian Community and Friends of India reception hosted by Sibi George

== Awards ==
George was presented the S.K. Singh Award for Excellence in Indian Foreign Service by Former Vice President of India Mohammad Hamid Ansari. He was congratulated for his services in aiding the Indian expatriates during the Saudi Arabian Nitaqat scheme, a law aimed at giving preferential employment to locals, and involving a drive to identify illegal migrant workers. The Indian Embassy negotiated solutions for all the Indians needing help. About 100,000 returned home, while the Embassy and the volunteers worked towards regularising the status of 1.4 million Indians who wanted to stay in Saudi Arabia.

== Personal life ==
He is married to artist Joice John Pampoorethu. They have three children.
