= Y. D. Gundevia =

Yezdezard Dinshaw Gundevia (1908–1986) was an Indian ICS officer, diplomat and Foreign Secretary under Jawaharlal Nehru and Lal Bahadur Shastri.

== Early life and career ==
Gundevia belonged to the Zoroastrian Parsi community. He graduated from Wilson College, Bombay in 1929 and joined the Indian Civil Service in 1930. He was posted to the United Provinces where he served in various districts until 1945.

== Diplomatic career ==
Following a mission to Rangoon, Gundevia was appointed Joint Secretary to the Ministry of External Affairs from 1948 to 1950. He then served as Counsellor at the Indian Embassy in Moscow. During 1953–1954, he served as the Indian Ambassador to Switzerland with concurrent accreditation to Austria and the Vatican. This was followed by stints as Deputy High Commissioner in London (1954–1956) and as High Commissioner in Ceylon (1957–1960). From 1961 to 1964, he was the Commonwealth Secretary at the Ministry of External Affairs and became the Foreign Secretary in 1964. He was Nehru's last foreign secretary and also served under Lal Bahadur Shastri during his two-year tenure. He later served as secretary to President S Radhakrishnan. Gundevia was closely involved with policy formulation on Kashmir having served as Special Secretary handling Kashmir Affairs in the United Nations and Commonwealth Secretary handling Kashmir Affairs before becoming the Foreign Secretary. He was also part of the Indian delegation during the Swaran Singh - Zulfikar Ali Bhutto talks on Kashmir during 1962–1963. Gundevia as the Foreign Secretary also led the Indian delegation during the first phase of peace talks with the Naga insurgents in 1965 achieving what he termed "a truce without a political settlement".

== Books ==
Gundevia chronicled much of his work in several books that he authored. These include In the Districts of the Raj about his life as an ICS officer in the United Provinces, The Testament of Sheikh Abdullah, based on his observations on Kashmir's politics and the Sheikh, War and Peace in Nagaland and Outside the Archives which chronicles his diplomatic career.

Diplomatic posts
Preceded by M. J. Desai	Foreign Secretary of India; 1963 - 1965	Succeeded by C. S. Jha
