= Eguga =

Eguga was a civitas in Africa Proconsulare during the Roman Empire. It was located in present-day Tunisia.

Eguga was also the seat of an ancient Catholic diocese of the same name. It was a suffragan diocese of the Archdiocese of Carthage. The only bishop mentioned by the sources was Florencio, who took part in the antimonothelite Council of Carthage in 646. Today, Eguga survives as a Latin Church titular see. The most recent titular bishop of Eguga was Gerard William Battersby, who served from 2016 to 2024.

List of Latin Catholic titular bishops of Eguga
| Name | Appointed | Concomitant appointment | Term end | Notes |
|---|---|---|---|---|
| Boniface Yang Fujie | 26 Mar 1931 | auxiliary bishop, Canton (Guangzhou), China | 23 Feb 1938 | Died in office |
| Vitus Zhang Zuohuan | 8 Jul 1941 | vicar apostolic, Sinyangchow, China | 11 Apr 1946 | Appointed bishop, Xinyang (Sinyang) |
| Louis-Amédée Lefèvre | 10 Apr 1947 | vicar apostolic, Rabat, Morocco | 14 Sep 1955 | Appointed archbishop, Rabat |
| Gustave Raballand | 29 Feb 1956 | vicar apostolic, Phnom Penh, Cambodia | 13 Jan 1973 | Resigned April 1962; Died in office as Vicar Apostolic Emeritus |
| Antonius Hubert Thijssen | 23 Feb 1973 | apostolic administrator, Denpasar, Indonesia | 7 Jun 1982 | Died in office |
| Marc Leclerc | 17 Jul 1982 | auxiliary bishop, Québec, Canada | 3 Jan 2005 | Died in office |
| Gilles Lemay | 11 Feb 2005 | auxiliary bishop, Québec, Canada | 22 Feb 2011 | Appointed bishop, Amos, Québec |
| Michael J. Byrnes | 22 Mar 2011 | auxiliary bishop, Detroit, U.S. | 31 Oct 2016 | Appointed coadjutor archbishop, Agaña, Guam |
| Gerard William Battersby | 23 Nov 2016 | auxiliary bishop, Detroit, U.S. | 19 Mar 2024 | Appointed bishop, La Crosse, Wisconsin, U.S. |
| Sergio Iván Dornelles | 03 Aug 2024 | auxiliary bishop, Buenos Aires, Argentina | In charge | None |
