= Donald Hanchon =

American prelate (born 1947)

His Excellency, The Most Reverend Donald Francis Hanchon
- Auxiliary Bishop Emeritus of Detroit; Titular Bishop of Horreomargum
- Archdiocese: Detroit
- Appointed: March 22, 2011
- Installed: May 5, 2011
- Retired: March 3, 2023
- Other post: Titular Bishop of Horreomargum

Orders
- Ordination: October 19, 1974 by John Dearden
- Consecration: May 5, 2011 by Allen Henry Vigneron, John Clayton Nienstedt, and John M. Quinn

Personal details
- Born: September 10, 1947 (age 78) Wayne, Michigan, US
- Denomination: Catholic Church
- Motto: Que crezca Jesus (Spanish for ″May Jesus grow″)

Styles of Donald Francis Hanchon
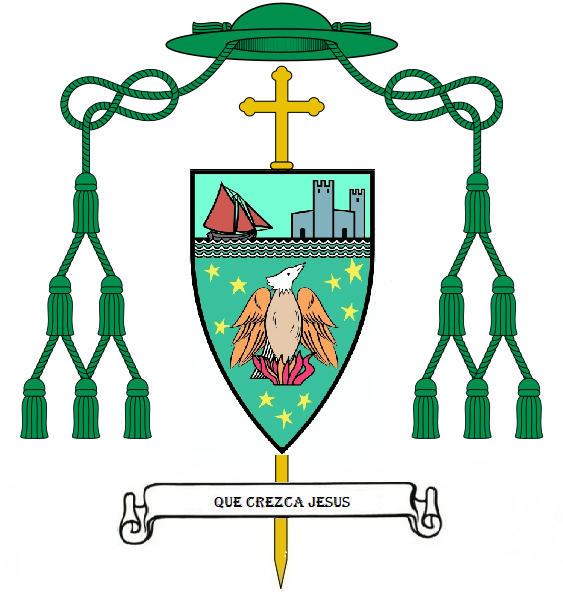
- Reference style: His Excellency; The Most Reverend
- Spoken style: Your Excellency
- Religious style: Bishop

Donald Francis Hanchon (born October 9, 1947), is an American prelate of the Roman Catholic Church who served as an auxiliary bishop for the Archdiocese of Detroit in Michigan.

== Biography ==
=== Early life ===
Donald Hanchon was born in Jackson, Michigan, on October 9, 1947, to John Michael and Alfreda (Glinicki) Hanchon, the middle of seven children. He is of Polish descent. Hanchon went to St. Mary's Grade School in Wayne, Michigan and then Sacred Heart Seminary in Detroit. In 1961, he entered Cardinal Mooney Latin School in Detroit.

Hanchon graduated in 1969 from Sacred Heart Seminary, then entered St. John's Provincial Seminary in Plymouth, Michigan, earning a Bachelor of Arts degree in 1971. He was awarded a Master of Theology degree from the University of Detroit Mercy in 1972 and a Master of Liturgy degree from the University of Notre Dame in Notre Dame, Indiana, in 1974.

=== Priesthood ===
Hanchon was ordained a priest by Cardinal John Dearden of the Archdiocese of Detroit on October 19, 1974. After his ordination, Hanchon served as associate pastor at Blessed Sacrament Cathedral Parish and at St. Mark Parish in Warren, Michigan. He also served as associate spiritual director at Sacred Heart Seminary and, between 1981 and 1986, as director of vocations for the archdiocese.

In 1986, Hanchon spent a year studying Spanish and Mexican culture in Mexico and at the Mexican American Cultural Center run by the Archdiocese of San Antonio in San Antonio, Texas. After returning to Detroit in 1987, he served as pastor in St. Joseph Parish in Monroe, Michigan for the next five years. Hanchon was transferred in 1992 to become pastor of St. Gabriel Parish in Detroit, serving there until 1999. Also in 1992, he was appointed coordinator for the archdiocesan pastoral plan for Hispanic ministry.

In 1999, Hanchon was named pastor of Most Holy Redeemer Parish in Detroit, a position he continued to hold after becoming bishop. In 2009, he was appointed as episcopal vicar and regional moderator of the Central Region of the archdiocese, which includes Detroit, Hamtramck, Michigan and Highland Park, Michigan.

=== Auxiliary Bishop of Detroit ===
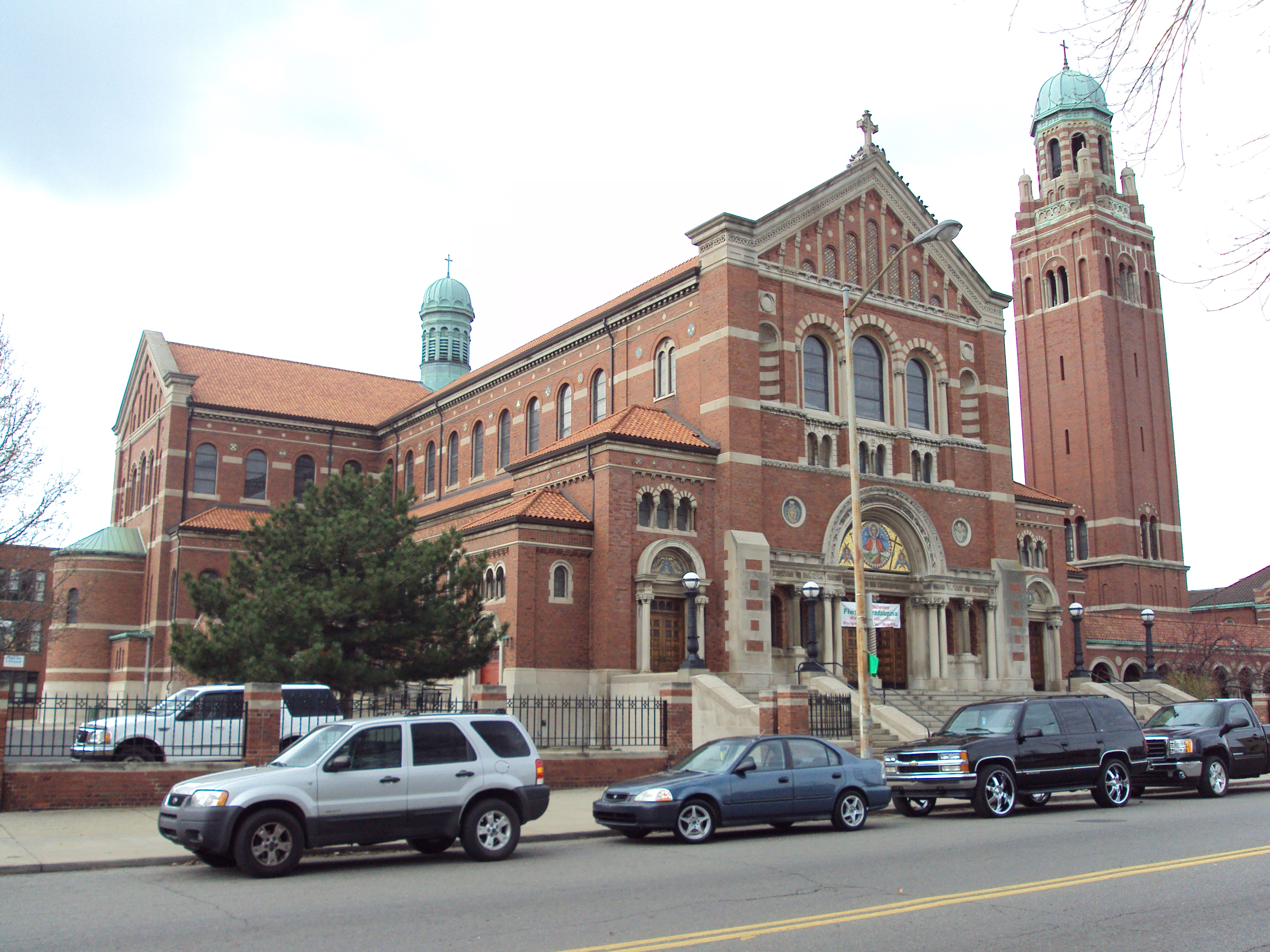
Holy Redeemer Church, Detroit, Michigan (2011)

Hanchon was appointed as the titular bishop of Horreomargum and an auxiliary bishop of Detroit on March 22, 2011, by Pope Benedict XVI. He was consecrated by Archbishop Allen H. Vigneron on May 5, 2011. Hanchon has been a member of the Jesus-Caritas Fraternity of Priests since 1975 and has served as an officer of the brotherhood.

On March 3, 2023, Pope Francis accepted Hanchon's request for retirement, having reached the mandatory retirement age of 75.

== See also ==
- Roman Catholic Archdiocese of Detroit
- Catholic Church hierarchy
- Catholic Church in the United States
- Historical list of the Catholic bishops of the United States
- List of Catholic bishops of the United States
- Lists of patriarchs, archbishops, and bishops

== Episcopal succession ==
Catholic Church titles
Preceded by -	Auxiliary Bishop of Detroit; 2011–2023	Succeeded by -
Preceded by Joseph Patrick McFadden	Roman Catholic Titular See of Horreomargum; 2011–present	Succeeded by Incumbent
