= Gerard William Battersby =

American Catholic prelate (born 1960)

The Most Reverend Gerard William Battersby
- Bishop of La Crosse
- Church: Catholic Church; Latin Church
- Diocese: La Crosse
- Appointed: March 19, 2024
- Installed: May 20, 2024
- Predecessor: William P. Callahan
- Previous posts: Auxiliary Bishop of Detroit (2016‍–‍2024); Titular Bishop of Eguga (2016‍–‍2024)

Orders
- Ordination: May 30, 1998 by Adam Maida
- Consecration: January 25, 2017 by Allen Henry Vigneron, John M. Quinn, and Paul Fitzpatrick Russell

Personal details
- Born: May 15, 1960 (age 66) Detroit, Michigan, US
- Education: B.S., Wayne State University; MDiv, Sacred Heart Major Seminary, 1998; Licentiate on New Evangelization, Sacred Heart Major Seminary, 2008
- Motto: In Sinu Patris (Latin for 'With the Father')

Styles of Gerard William Battersby
- Reference style: His Excellency; The Most Reverend
- Spoken style: Your Excellency
- Religious style: Bishop

Gerard William Battersby (born May 15, 1960) is an American Catholic prelate who served as an auxiliary bishop for the Archdiocese of Detroit in Michigan from 2016 to 2024. On March 19, 2024, he was appointed Bishop of La Crosse. He was installed during a ceremony on May 20, 2024 at the Cathedral of St Joseph the Workman.

== Biography ==
=== Early life ===
Gerard Battersby was born in Detroit, Michigan, on May 15, 1960, to Christopher and Helen (Buckley) Battersby. He attended St. Benedict Parish and Lamphere Public Schools in Madison Heights, Michigan. Battersby then entered Wayne State University in Detroit, obtaining a Bachelor of Science degree in biology. While on a college trip to the British Isles, Battersby said he first realized that he would eventually become a priest.

“When I was in Ireland, I had an experience over the Easter week — actually I was at a youth hostel in Scotland — and I was musing about my life. One morning I woke up very early and I had what I guess I now would call an illumination: I knew I was going to be a priest. I had no previous desire or inkling — as a typical Catholic boy that was always somewhere in the background, but it was never in the forefront — but I really felt very strongly that that was the case.

Although his original plan was to go to medical school, Battersby decided after graduation to work for a pharmaceutical company. He later became an appraiser in his father's business. In 1993, Battersby decided to enter the priesthood. He graduated from Sacred Heart Major Seminary in Detroit with a Master of Divinity degree in 1998.

=== Priesthood ===
On May 30, 1998, Battersby was ordained by Cardinal Adam Maida to the priesthood for the Archdiocese of Detroit at the Cathedral of the Most Blessed Sacrament in Detroit. After his 1998 ordination, the archdiocese assigned Battersby as associate pastor to the following Michigan parishes:

- St. Thecla in Clinton Township
- Presentation/Our Lady of Victory in Detroit
- Immaculate Heart of Mary in Detroit
- St. Gerard in Detroit

Battersby was named pastor at St. Christopher Parish in Detroit in 2002, serving there for the next five years. In 2007, Cardinal Adam Maida named him as director of formation at Sacred Heart Major Seminary. Battersby was also transferred to St. Leo Parish in Detroit to serve as pastor there. He was awarded a Licentiate in the New Evangelization from Sacred Heart in 2008.

In 2011, Battersby moved to the position of pastor at St. Mary's of Redford Parish in Detroit and was also named vice rector of Sacred Heart. Archbishop Allen Vigneron appointed Battersby as vicar forane in 2015.

=== Auxiliary Bishop of Detroit ===
On November 23, 2016, Pope Francis appointed Battersby as titular bishop of Eguga and as an auxiliary bishop of Detroit. On January 25, 2017, Battersby was consecrated at the Cathedral of the Most Blessed Sacrament by Vigneron, with Bishop John M. Quinn and Paul Fitzpatrick Russell serving as co-consecrators. Battersby's episcopal lineage dates back through Popes Pius X (1884), Clement XIII (1743), Benedict XIV (1724), and Benedict XIII (1675).

In March 2020, Battersby sent a letter to Reverend Victor Clore, the pastor of Christ the King Parish in Detroit. It said that the local support group for families of LGBTQ Catholics, Fortunate Families, was forbidden to meet at his church or any other church facility in the archdiocese. The letter also said that Fortunate Families must discontinue its claim to be "Catholic operating in the Archdiocese of Detroit". Battersby wrote that the group's dissent from Catholic teaching presented a danger to its membership. He suggested that their members join with EnCourage, an approved ministry operating in the archdiocese.

=== Bishop of La Crosse ===
On March 19, 2024, Pope Francis named Battersby as the eleventh bishop of La Crosse, succeeding William Callahan. He was installed on May 20, 2024.

== See also ==
- Catholic Church in the United States
- Hierarchy of the Catholic Church
- Historical list of the Catholic bishops of the United States
- List of Catholic bishops in the United States
- Lists of popes, patriarchs, primates, archbishops, and bishops
