= Robert Joseph Fisher =

American prelate (born 1959)

His Excellency, The Most Reverend Robert Joseph Fisher
- Auxiliary Bishop of Detroit; Titular Bishop of Forum Popilii
- Archdiocese: Detroit
- Appointed: November 23, 2016
- Installed: January 25, 2017
- Other post: Titular Bishop of Forum Popilii

Orders
- Ordination: June 27, 1992
- Consecration: January 25, 2017 by Allen Henry Vigneron, John M. Quinn, and Paul Fitzpatrick Russell

Personal details
- Born: September 24, 1959 (age 66) Detroit, Michigan, US
- Education: University of Detroit; Sacred Heart Major Seminary
- Motto: Per caritatem servite invicem (Out of love, place yourselves at one another’s service)

Styles of Robert Joseph Fisher
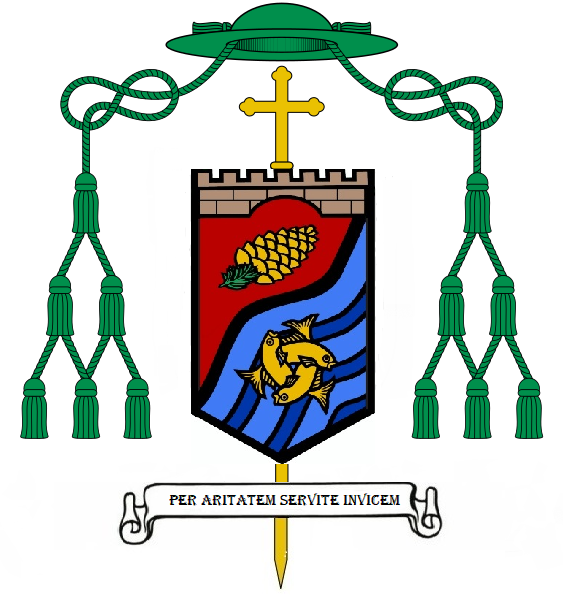
- Reference style: His Excellency; The Most Reverend
- Spoken style: Your Excellency
- Religious style: Bishop

Robert Joseph Fisher (born September 24, 1959) is an American prelate of the Roman Catholic Church who has been serving as an auxiliary bishop for the Archdiocese of Detroit in Michigan since 2016.

== Biography ==
=== Early life ===
Robert Fisher was born in Detroit, Michigan, on September 24, 1959, the oldest of the four children of Robert and Trudy (Torzewski) Fisher. He attended Epiphany and St. Bede Elementary schools, both in Detroit, then went to the University of Detroit Jesuit High School. During his summer breaks, Fisher worked at the Catholic Youth Organization (CYO) at their summer camps near Port Sanilac, Michigan. He graduated from the University of Detroit Mercy with a Bachelor of Science degree in management science.

After finishing college, Fisher started working full time for CYO in their camping department. By 1986, he had decided to enter the priesthood and began his studies at Sacred Heart Major Seminary in Detroit, eventually earning a Master of Divinity degree.

=== Priesthood ===
Fisher was ordained to the priesthood for the Archdiocese of Detroit at the Cathedral of the Most Blessed Sacrament in Detroit by Cardinal Adam Maida on June 27, 1992. After his ordination, the archdiocese assigned Fisher as associate pastor at Our Lady Star of the Sea Parish in Grosse Pointe Woods, Michigan. In 1995, Maida named Fisher as director of priestly vocations for the archdiocese.

In 2000, Fisher was appointed as pastor of St. Angela Parish in Roseville, Michigan. He was transferred in 2004 to serve as pastor of St. Lawrence Parish in Utica, Michigan, a post he would hold for the next 11 years. In 2014, Archbishop Allen Vigneron named Fisher as rector of the National Shrine of the Little Flower Basilica in Royal Oak, Michigan. Fisher also served on the Catholic Schools Council and the CYO board of directors.

=== Auxiliary Bishop of Detroit ===
Pope Francis appointed Fisher as an auxiliary bishop of Detroit and titular bishop of Forum Pompilii on November 23, 2016. On January 25, 2017, he was installed and consecrated by Archbishop Allen Vigneron at the Cathedral of the Most Blessed Sacrament, with Bishop John M. Quinn and Archbishop Paul Russell serving as co-consecrators. Fisher chose as his episcopal motto Per Caritatem Servite Invicem, meaning "Out of love, place yourselves at one another’s service", from Galatians 5:13 in the New Testament. Fisher currently serves as episcopal vicar and regional moderator for the Northeast Region of the archdiocese.

== See also ==
- Catholic Church hierarchy
- Catholic Church in the United States
- Historical list of the Catholic bishops of the United States
- List of Catholic bishops of the United States
- Lists of patriarchs, archbishops, and bishops

Catholic Church titles
| Preceded by - | Auxiliary Bishop of Detroit; 2017-Present | Succeeded by - |
