= John Samuel Foley =

American prelate

The Most Reverend John Samuel Foley D.D.
- Bishop of Detroit
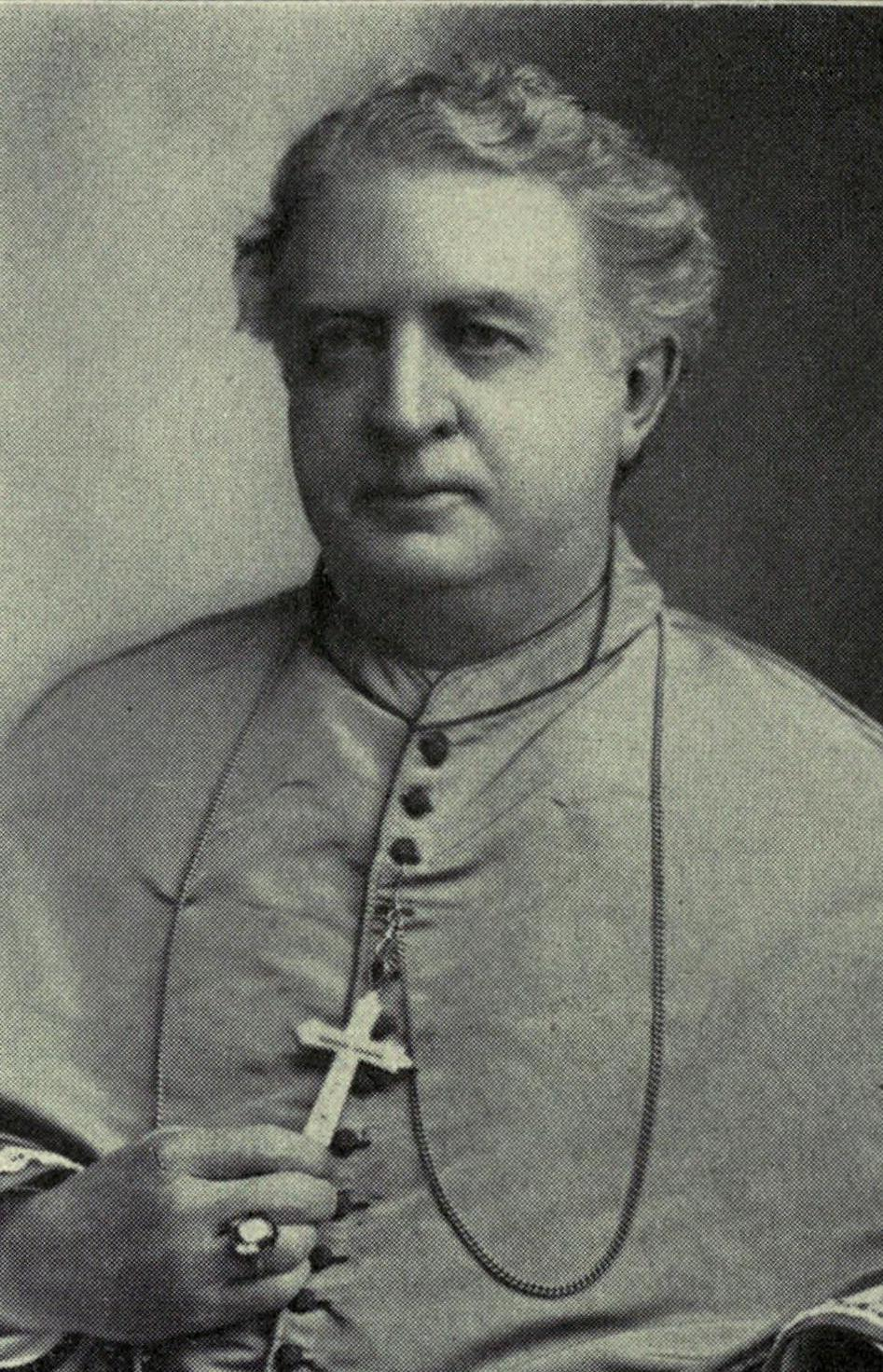
- Diocese: Detroit
- Appointed: 3 August 1888
- Term ended: January 5, 1918
- Predecessor: Caspar Henry Borgess
- Successor: Michael Gallagher

Orders
- Ordination: December 20, 1856 by Costantino Patrizi Naro
- Consecration: November 4, 1888 by James Gibbons

Personal details
- Born: November 5, 1833 Baltimore, Maryland
- Died: January 5, 1918 (aged 84)
- Denomination: Roman Catholic

Styles of John Samuel Foley
- Reference style: The Most Reverend
- Spoken style: Your Excellency
- Religious style: Bishop
- Posthumous style: not applicable

John Samuel Foley (November 5, 1833 – January 5, 1918) was an American prelate of the Roman Catholic Church. He served as Bishop of Detroit from 1888 until his death in 1918.

== Biography ==
John Foley was born in Baltimore, Maryland, to Matthew and Elizabeth (née Murphy) Foley, who were both natives of Enniscorthy, County Wexford, Ireland. His older brother was Bishop Thomas Foley, who served as Coadjutor Bishop of Chicago (1870–1879). After attending local parochial schools in Baltimore, he completed his studies in the classics and philosophy at St. Mary's College in 1850. He then studied theology at St. Mary's Seminary until 1853, when he was sent by Archbishop Francis Kenrick to further his studies in Rome at the Pontifical Athenaeum S. Apollinare, from where he obtained his Licentiate of Sacred Theology in 1857.

While in Rome, Foley was ordained to the priesthood by Cardinal Costantino Patrizi on December 20, 1856, at the Lateran Basilica. Upon his return to Maryland in November 1857, he served as pastor of St. Brigid's Church in Baltimore. He was transferred to Saint Paul Catholic Church at Ellicott's Mills in 1858, and then to St. Peter's Church in Baltimore as a curate in 1864. In 1865 he founded and became first pastor of St. Martin's Church. Foley also served as principal of the House of the Good Shepherd, and assisted Archbishop Martin John Spalding in establishing new missions and schools and developing charitable institutions. A childhood friend of Cardinal James Gibbons, he was secretary of the Third Plenary Council of Baltimore in 1884 and co-authored the Baltimore Catechism. He was nominated as Bishop of Wilmington, Delaware in 1886, but his name was rejected by the Congregation for the Propagation of the Faith.

On February 11, 1888, Foley was appointed the third Bishop of Detroit, Michigan, by Pope Leo XIII. He received his episcopal consecration on the following November 4 from Cardinal Gibbons, with Bishops John Loughlin and Edgar Wadhams serving as co-consecrators, at the Baltimore Cathedral. He was Detroit's first American-born bishop, with his two predecessors both hailing from Germany. During his tenure, he established a seminary for Polish Americans, and later healed a long and damaging schism among them. In 1900, Foley wrote a letter for the Detroit Century Box, a time capsule. In 1907 the priests and laity of the diocese, in honor of the golden jubilee of his priestly ordination, presented Foley with St. Francis's Home for Orphan Boys, built at a cost of $250,000. He established the first parish for African Americans, St. Peter Claver's Church, in 1911, although chapels and missions for African American Catholics had existed since the late 1870s. The development of the automobile industry in Detroit led to a massive increase in population, and the number of Catholics more than tripled during Foley's tenure. Although the number of diocesan priests nearly doubled, there still were not enough to administer to the growing population. Despite his popularity and personal charm, he was generally regarded as an ineffective bishop with an unsuccessful administration.

Foley later died at age 84. His 30-year-long tenure remains the longest in the history of the Archdiocese of Detroit.

== See also ==
- Eloise Cemetery

Catholic Church titles
Preceded by Caspar Henry Borgess	Bishop of Detroit; 1888–1918	Succeeded by Michael Gallagher
