= Allen Vigneron =

American Catholic prelate (born 1948)

His Excellency, The Most Reverend Allen Henry Vigneron
- Archbishop Emeritus of Detroit; Ecclesiastical Superior-Emeritus of the Cayman Islands
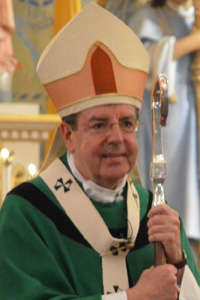
- Church: Catholic
- Archdiocese: Detroit
- Appointed: January 5, 2009
- Installed: January 28, 2009
- Retired: February 11, 2025
- Predecessor: Adam Maida
- Successor: Edward Weisenburger
- Other post: Ecclesiastical Superior of the Cayman Islands
- Previous posts: Bishop of Oakland (2003‍–‍2009); Auxiliary Bishop of Detroit and Titular Bishop of Sault Sainte Marie (1996‍–‍2003); Vice president of the United States Conference of Catholic Bishops (2019‍–‍2022)

Orders
- Ordination: July 26, 1975 by John Francis Dearden
- Consecration: July 9, 1996 by Adam Maida, James Aloysius Hickey, and Edmund Szoka

Personal details
- Born: October 21, 1948 (age 78) Mount Clemens, Michigan, US
- Education: Sacred Heart Major Seminary; Pontifical Gregorian University; Catholic University of America
- Motto: Aspicientes in Iesum (Latin for 'Eyes fixed on Jesus')

Styles of Allen Henry Vigneron
- Reference style: His Excellency; The Most Reverend
- Spoken style: Your Excellency
- Religious style: Archbishop

Ordination history of Allen Vigneron
History
Priestly ordination
- Ordained by: John Francis Dearden
- Date: July 26, 1975
- Place: Saint Clement of Rome, Church, Romeo, MI
Episcopal consecration
- Principal consecrator: Adam Maida
- Co-consecrators: James Aloysius Hickey, Edmund Szoka
- Date: July 9, 1996
Episcopal succession
Bishops consecrated by Allen Vigneron as principal consecrator
- Bernard Hebda: 2009
- Michael J. Byrnes: 2011
- Jose Arturo Cepeda Escobedo: 2011
- Donald F. Hanchon: 2011
- Paul J. Bradley: 2011
- David Walkowiak: 2013
- John Francis Doerfler: 2014
- Steven J. Raica: 2014
- Gerard William Battersby: 2017
- Robert Joseph Fisher: 2017

Coat of arms with the previous diocesan logo

Allen Henry Vigneron (born October 21, 1948) is an American Catholic prelate who served as archbishop of the Archdiocese of Detroit in Michigan and ecclesiastical superior of the Cayman Islands from 2008 to 2025.

Vigneron previously served as bishop of the Diocese of Oakland in California from 2003 to 2009 and as an auxiliary bishop of Detroit from 1996 to 2003.

== Biography ==
=== Early life ===
The eldest of six children, Allen Vigneron was born on October 21, 1948, in Mount Clemens, Michigan, to Elwin and Bernardine (née Kott) Vigneron. He is of French descent on his father's side and German descent on his mother's.

Deciding to become a priest, Vigneron entered Sacred Heart Major Seminary in Detroit. He graduated from there in 1970, receiving degrees in both philosophy and classical languages. He then furthered his studies at the Pontifical Gregorian University in Rome, where he obtained a Bachelor of Sacred Theology degree in 1973.

=== Priesthood ===
Upon his return to Detroit, Vigneron was ordained to the priesthood for the Archdiocese of Detroit by Cardinal John Dearden on July 26, 1975, at St. Clement of Rome Church in Romeo, Michigan.

After his 1975 ordination, the archdiocese assigned Vigneron as an associate pastor of Our Lady Queen of Peace Parish in Harper Woods, Michigan. He later returned to Rome, obtaining his Licentiate in Sacred Theology from the Gregorian University in 1977. After coming back to Michigan, he resumed his pastoral work in suburban Detroit.

Vigneron completed his graduate studies at the Catholic University of America in Washington, D.C. He earned his Doctor of Philosophy degree in 1987 with a dissertation on the philosopher Edmund Husserl. In 1985, Vigneron was appointed professor at Sacred Heart Seminary, becoming its dean in 1988.

In 1991, Vigneron served in Rome as an official in the Vatican Secretariat of State and as adjunct instructor at the Gregorian University. He returned to Sacred Heart Seminary in 1994 as its rector. While at Sacred Heart, Vigneron removed several teachers whom he perceived as straying from church dogma. Vigneron was raised by Pope John Paul II to the rank of monsignor in 1994.

== Episcopate ==
=== Auxiliary Bishop of Detroit ===
On June 12, 1996, John Paul II appointed Vigneron as an auxiliary bishop of Detroit and titular bishop of Sault Sainte Marie. He was consecrated on July 9, 1996, at the Cathedral of the Most Blessed Sacrament in Detroit by Cardinal Adam Maida, with Cardinals James Hickey and Edmund Szoka serving as co-consecrators.

=== Bishop of Oakland ===
John Paul II named Vigneron was as coadjutor bishop of Oakland on January 10, 2003. He automatically succeeded Bishop John Cummins as the third bishop of Oakland on October 1, 2003.

While bishop, Vigneron helped lead protests against same-sex marriage.

=== Archbishop of Detroit ===
Pope Benedict XVI appointed Vigneron as archbishop of Detroit on January 5, 2009, replacing Cardinal Maida. Installed on January 28, 2009, Vigneron was the first Detroit native named archbishop of Detroit.

Vigneron was elected chair of the board of trustees of Catholic University of America on June 9, 2009. He received the pallium from Benedict XVI on June 29, 2009, in a ceremony at St. Peter's Basilica in Rome.In April 2011, Vigneron participated in an interfaith vigil at the Islamic Center of America in Dearborn, Michigan.

In May 2019, Vigneron published the pastoral note "The Day of the Lord". This note ended required Sunday sports practices and games in Catholic schools, with the aim of refocusing the sabbath on prayer, family and rest.

In November 2019, Vigneron was elected vice president of the United States Conference of Catholic Bishops (USCCB). At the end of the November 2020 USCCB meeting, Bishop José Gómez, USCCB president, created a bishops' working group headed by Vigneron to formulate a strategy for dealing with the newly elected US President Joe Biden. According to the Washington Post, the group's work led to an unsuccessful effort by conservative bishops to approve a document at the June 2021 USCCB meeting that would have penalized Catholic politicians who support abortion rights for women.

Vigneron announced in June 2020 that the archdiocese was restructuring 200 parishes into 60 to 80 parish groups to deal with the shortage of priests.

In December 2020, a lawsuit accused Vigernon of failing to investigate complaints of sexual abuse at Orchard Lake Schools, an educational center in the archdiocese. Several male employees had accused Reverend Miroslaw Krol. chancellor of Orchard Lakes, of making sexual advances on them. A school board member who ultimately resigned said that he tried to bring the allegations to Vigneron, also a board member. However, Vigneron allegedly refused to listen to the allegations because he said they were second-hand. Ned McGrath, the archdiocese spokesman, said the archdiocese did not run Orchard Lakes and that Krol was under the jurisdiction of the Archdiocese of Newark. By February 2021, the group had finished its work, but there was uncertainty about its final report.

In March 2021, a Michigan man filed a sexual abuse lawsuit against Vigneron and the archdiocese. The plaintiff claimed to have been raped in 2010 when he was eight years-old by Aloysius Volskis, then a teacher at Bishop Kelly Catholic School in Lapeer, Michigan. Volskis allegedly told the boy that he had power with the devil and would kill his mother if the boy revealed his abuse. After a female student reported an assault by Volskis to police, he fled the country. The suit claimed that Vigneron and the archdiocese were negligent in their oversight of the school. The archdiocese had assigned Volkis to Bishop Kelly after he was accused of sexual misconduct at Divine Providence Parish in Southfield, Michigan.

=== Retirement and legacy ===
On February 11, 2025, Pope Francis accepted Vigneron's retirement as archbishop of Detroit and superior of the Cayman Islands, and named Bishop Edward Weisenburger from the Diocese of Tucson to succeed him.

== Viewpoints ==
=== Abortion ===
In February 2009, Vigneron compared abortion and stem-cell research to slavery and racism.

=== LGBT rights ===
In 2013, Vigneron stated that Catholics who supported same sex-marriage should not accept the Eucharist at mass. In 2015, he stated that the archdiocese did not want to discourage any Catholics from receiving the Eucharist. However, he said that, according to Catholic doctrine, any Catholic conscious of serious sin (such as supporting same-sex marriage) should go to a sacramental confession before receiving the Eucharist.

=== Immigration ===
In December 2015, U.S. presidential candidate Donald Trump said that, if elected, he would restrict Muslim immigration into the United States. In response, Vigneron wrote a letter to priests in the archdiocese condemning the Trump proposals:

While the Catholic Church refrains from weighing in for or against individual candidates for a particular political office, the Church does and should speak to the morality of this important and far-reaching issue of religious liberty. Especially as our political discourse addresses the very real concerns about the security of our country, our families, and our values, we need to remember that religious rights are a cornerstone of these values. Restricting or sacrificing these religious rights and liberties out of fear – instead of defending them and protecting them in the name of mutual respect and justice – is a rationalization which fractures the very foundation of morality on which we stand. "

== See also ==
- Hierarchy of the Catholic Church
- Catholic Church in the United States
- Historical list of the Catholic bishops of the United States
- List of Catholic bishops in the United States
- Lists of popes, patriarchs, primates, archbishops, and bishops

Catholic Church titles
Preceded by Adam Maida	Archbishop of Detroit; 2009 – 2025	Succeeded by Edward Weisenburger
Preceded by Adam Maida	Ecclesiastical Superior of the Cayman Islands; 2009 – 2025	Succeeded by Edward Weisenburger
Preceded by John Stephen Cummins	Bishop of Oakland; 2003–2009	Succeeded by Salvatore Cordileone
Preceded by —	Auxiliary Bishop of Detroit; 1996-2003	Succeeded by —
