= Cathedral of the Most Blessed Sacrament =

Historic church in Michigan, United States

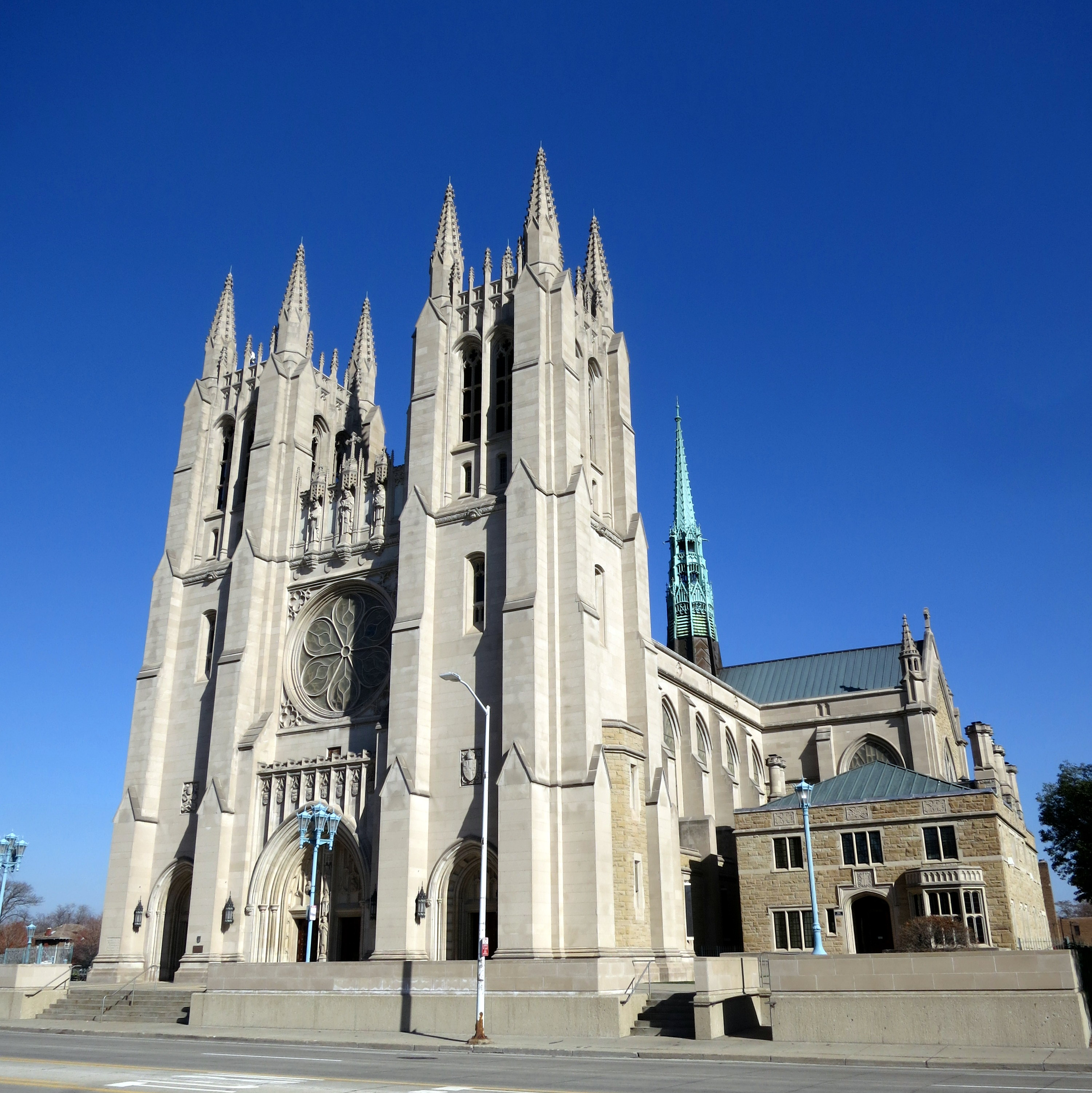
- Woodward Avenue façade and rectory
- Cathedral of the Most Blessed Sacrament
- 42.3885824°N 83.0850898°W
- Location: 9844 Woodward Avenue; Detroit, Michigan
- Country: United States
- Denomination: Roman Catholic
- Website: www.cathedral.aod.org

History
- Status: Cathedral (also a parish church)

Architecture
- Functional status: Active
- Heritage designation: NRHP
- Designated: 1982
- Architect(s): Henry A. Walsh, George F. Diehl
- Style: Decorated Neo-Gothic

Administration
- Archdiocese: Detroit

Clergy
- Archbishop: Most Rev. Edward Weisenburger
- Rector: Rev. J.J. Mech
- Cathedral of the Most Blessed Sacrament
- U.S. National Register of Historic Places
- Built: 1915
- Architect: Henry A. Walsh; George Diehl
- MPS: Religious Structures of Woodward Avenue TR
- NRHP reference No.: 82002894
- Added to NRHP: August 3, 1982

The Cathedral of the Most Blessed Sacrament is a Neo-Gothic style Roman Catholic cathedral of the Roman Catholic Archdiocese of Detroit. The cathedral is located at 9844 Woodward Avenue in Detroit, Michigan, in the United States, adjacent to the Boston-Edison Historic District. The cathedral was listed on the National Register of Historic Places in 1982.

Construction started on Most Blessed Sacrament as a parish church in 1905, but it was not dedicated until 1930. After the Diocese of Detroit became the Archdiocese of Detroit in 1923, the church was repurposed as the cathedral. Construction of its towers and facade was not completed until 1951, the year of the cathedral's consecration. Pope John Paul II briefly visited Most Blessed Sacrament in 1987.

== History ==
In 1905, Bishop John Samuel Foley erected the Most Blessed Sacrament Parish in Detroit. Its first services were held in an old shoe factory. That same year, the parish constructed a two-story brick building to house the church and its school. However, with 200 families already belonging to the parish, it soon became inadequate. Delayed by financial problems, construction on the permanent building finally commenced in 1913, with the roof and stonework completed by 1915. In 1930, Bishop Michael J. Gallagher dedicated the new church. Construction on the towers and facade were left for a later date.

In May 1937, Pope Pius IX elevated the Diocese of Detroit to the Archdiocese of Detroit. At that time, St. Patrick's Church in the Brush Hills section of the city served as the cathedral. Archbishop Edward Mooney immediately petitioned the Vatican for approval to dedicate the larger, more modern Most Blessed Sacrament Church as the cathedral. The Vatican agreed in February 1938.

To prepare the church, the archdiocese enlarged the seating capacity of the church by 60 people, erected a new cathedra and moved the pulpit. Mooney rededicated the church in April 1938 as the new cathedral. The archdiocese then start planning for the construction of the towers and facade. However, construction was delayed after the American entry into World War II in 1941.

After the war ended in 1945, construction restarted on the cathedral, finishing in 1951. On November 17 of that year, Archbishop Mooney consecrated Most Blessed Sacrament in a ceremony attended by 600 priests and 110 bishops and archbishops that was broadcast live on local television.

In September 1987, during a papal visit to the United States, Pope John Paul II visited Detroit and stopped at Most Blessed Sacrament to greet gathered guests.

Plans also called for spires topping the towers, however these remain unbuilt. Starting in 1985, and lasting until the early 2000s, Gunnar Birkerts, a well-known local architect was commissioned to redesign the interior of the cathedral, as well as designing the furniture for the papal visit, some of which is still in existence at the cathedral.

Archbishop Allen Vigneron in March 2020 announced the construction of a grotto dedicated to Our Lady of Lourdes on the cathedral grounds. This was to give thanks for the divine healing during the COVID-19 pandemic that started that winter. The archdiocese and Detroit Mayor Mike Duggan announced in 2023 the construction of 54 affordable housing units on a property owned by the cathedral.

In January 2024, the archdiocese unveiled 14 wooden painted statues of the twelve apostles and two angels mounted on the walls of the sanctuary. Carved in Italy in 1927, the statues had previously resided at St. Benedict Church in Highland Park, Michigan, which closed in 2014. The apostle statues were 7 feet (2.1 m) tall and the angels 8 feet (2.4 m) tall. The archdiocese stated that this was part of the goal to make the cathedral more accessible and welcoming to people.

== Architecture ==
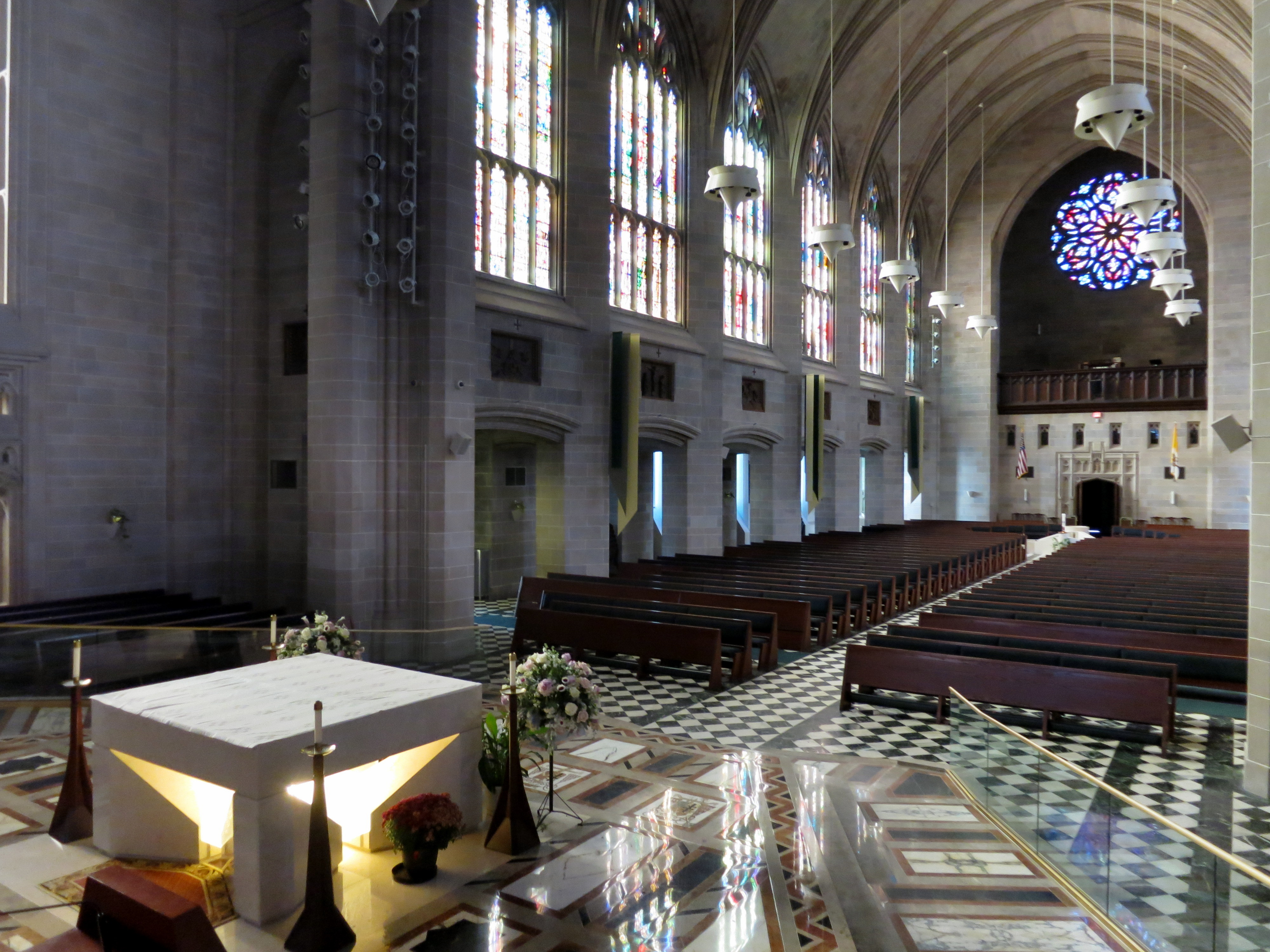
View of the nave from the sanctuary (2015)

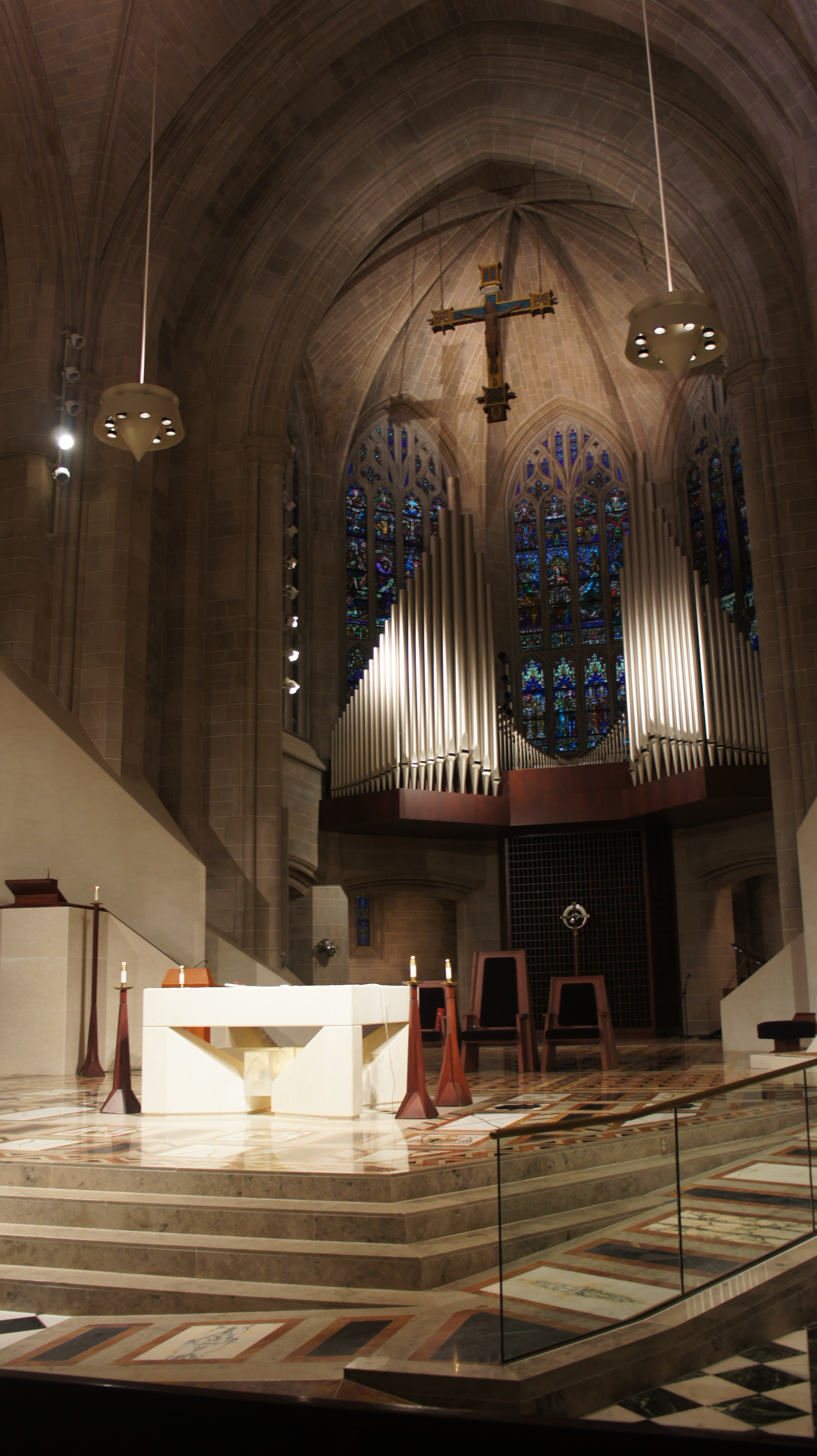
Sanctuary, Cathedral of the Most Blessed Sacrament (2016)

The cathedral's architect was Henry A. Walsh of Cleveland, who designed the cathedral in a Norman Gothic style. Due to the length of the construction, Walsh was unable to see the project to completion, and Detroit architect George Diehl was chosen to succeed him for the construction of the towers in 1950. The building's exterior is made of Ohio sandstone, with Indiana limestone used for buttress facings, traceries, and doorways. The cathedral includes external and internal statuary by sculptor Corrado Parducci.

In 2001, Gunnar Birkerts was selected to update the cathedral. Changes included a plaza on the north side of the structure, reconfigured interior spaces, a new sanctuary, cathedra, baptismal font and organ. The original organ was installed the west gallery by Casavant Frères in 1925 as a gift from Frederick Fisher of Fisher Body. During the renovations, this three manual/50 rank instrument was restored and a second organ was installed in the apse.

The new organ is opus 2785 of Austin Organs, Inc. with two manuals and 32 ranks and is connected to the gallery organ allowing them to be played as one instrument from the new console. The new organ was first played at the rededication ceremony March 25, 2003.

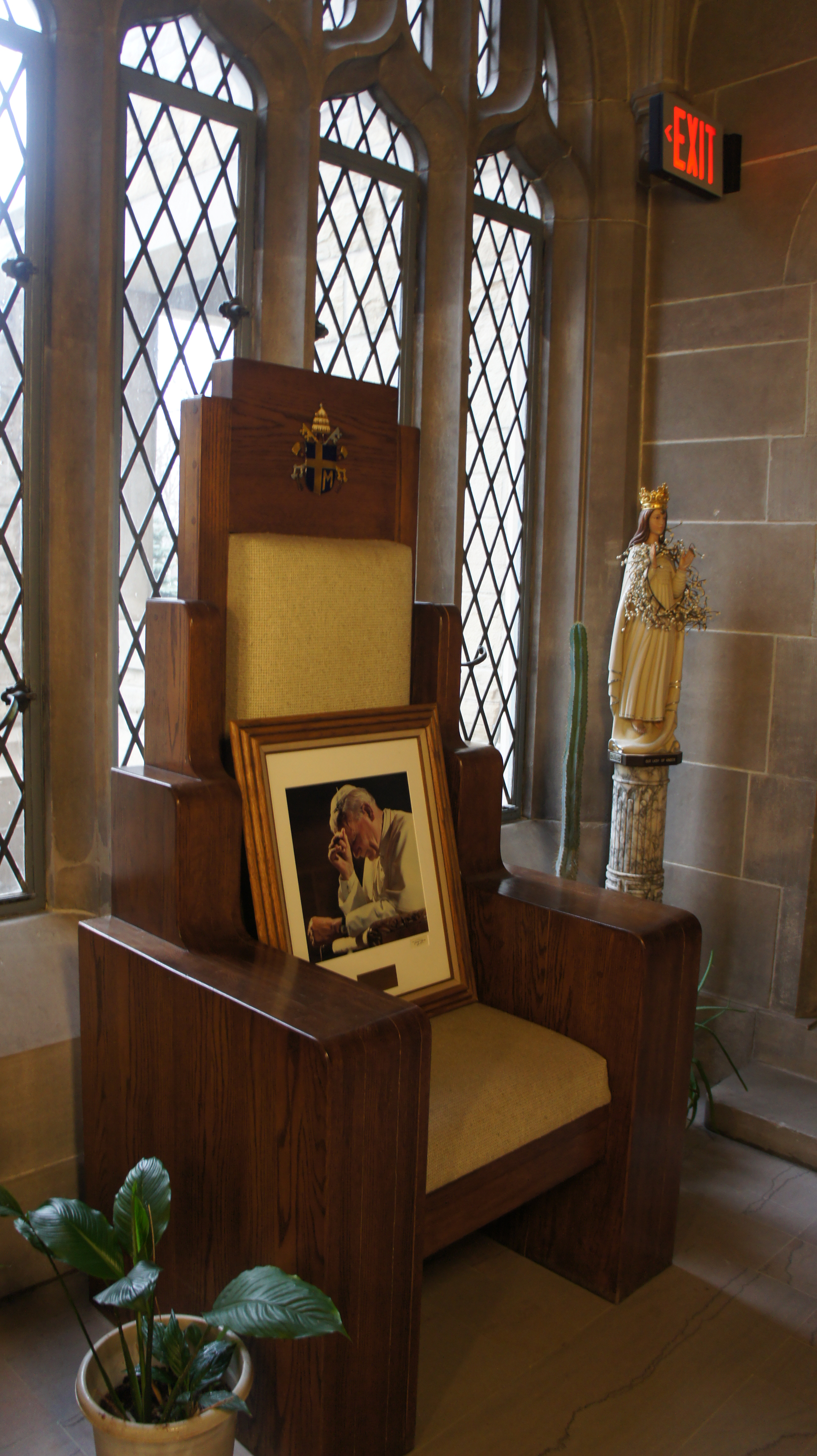
Chair used by Pope John Paul II in 1987 (2016)

== See also ==
- List of Catholic cathedrals in the United States
- List of cathedrals in the United States
