= Sacred Heart Church (Detroit) =

Historic church in Michigan, United States

- Sacred Heart Roman Catholic Church, Convent and Rectory
- U.S. National Register of Historic Places
- Michigan State Historic Site
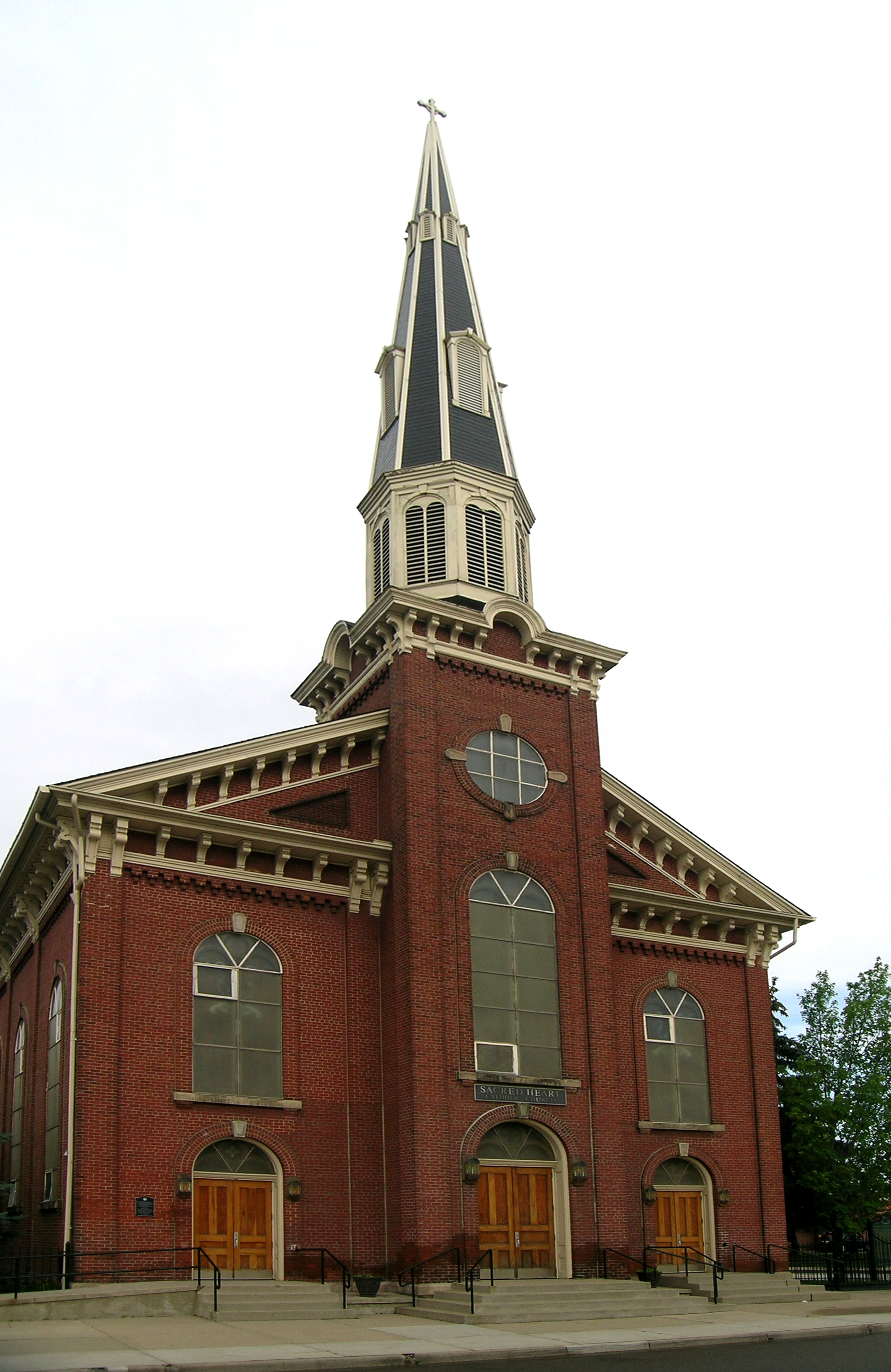
- Façade of Sacred Heart Church
- Interactive map
- Location: 1000 Eliot Street; Detroit, Michigan
- Coordinates: 42°21′3″N 83°2′47″W
- Built: 1875
- Architect: Peter J. Diederichs
- Architectural style: Italianate, Romanesque Revival
- NRHP reference No.: 80001926

Significant dates
- Added to NRHP: June 6, 1980
- Designated MSHS: June 19, 1975

The Sacred Heart Roman Catholic Church, Convent and Rectory is a Roman Catholic church complex located at 1000 Eliot Street in Detroit, Michigan. It was designated a Michigan State Historic Site in 1975 and listed on the National Register of Historic Places in 1980.

== History ==
Sacred Heart, built in 1875, was the third German Roman Catholic church constructed in Detroit. The parish was founded to serve the German members of the Detroit community, not only with the church itself, but also with its primary and secondary schools. The church continued as a primarily German parish until after World War I, when large numbers of blacks moved into Detroit and settled along Hastings Street. The German population slowly moved out at this time.

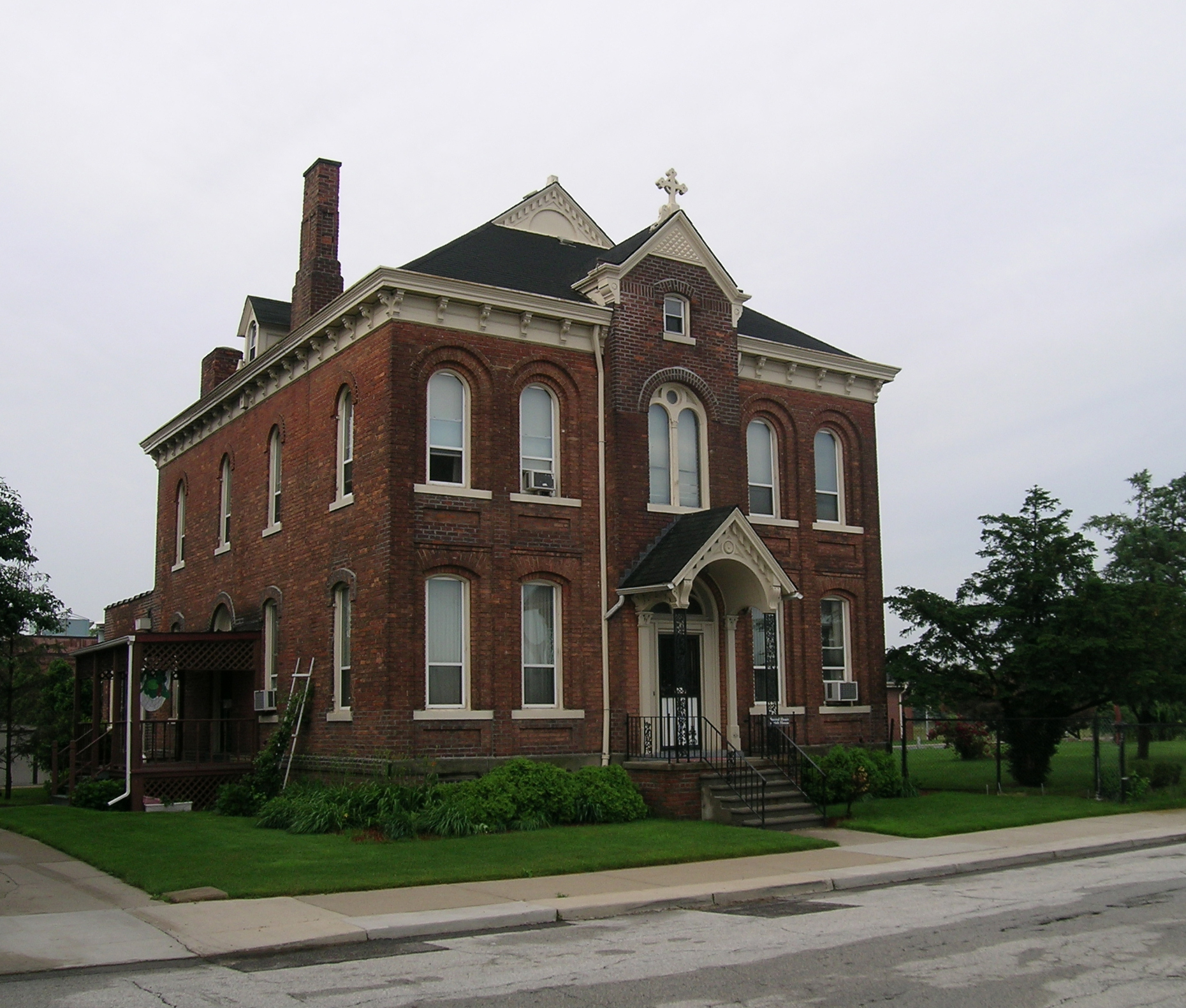
Sacred Heart Church Rectory

In 1911, some of the newer black residents of the Catholic faith established a chapel at old St. Mary's. In 1914, the growing congregation moved to a converted Episcopalian church at Eliot and Beaubien. The church flourished, and in the late 1930s, the congregation petitioned to move to the nearby Sacred Heart, due in part to the school building on the site. In 1938, Sacred Heart was converted from a German parish to an African American parish. The congregation at this time measured approximately 1500 members, and they quickly utilized the school at Sacred Heart, graduating the first high school class in 1945.

After World War II, the Interstate 75 freeway was built through the area, displacing the black parishioners living on Hastings. In 1957, the parish closed its secondary school and, eight years later, its primary school. However, the church still continues to offer weekly mass.

== Architecture ==
The Sacred Heart church is a red brick, pedimented Italianate structure with an entrance projecting toward the street. The wood belfry and spire are painted a cream color, contrasting with the deep red of the brick walls. Six bays with two-story windows line both sides of this church. The seventh bay houses the sacristy and service rooms are located in the seventh bays.

== See also ==
- Archdiocese of Detroit
