= Sacred Heart Major Seminary =

Catholic seminary in Detroit, Michigan, USA

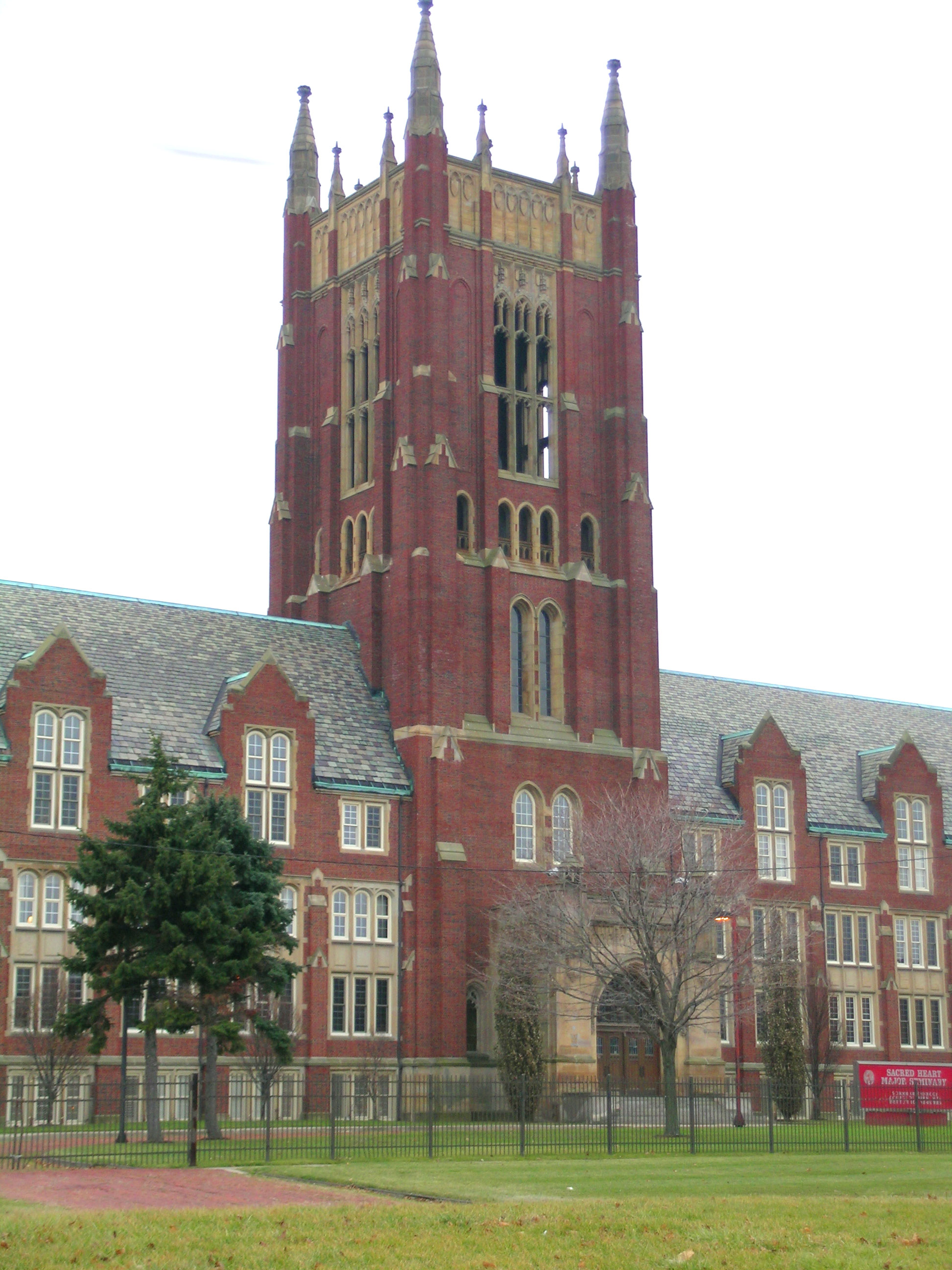
- Type: Private seminary
- Established: 1919
- Religious affiliation: Roman Catholic (Archdiocese of Detroit)
- President: Fr. Stephen Burr
- Faculty: 50
- Students: 300
- Location: Detroit, Michigan, United States
- Website: www.shms.edu
- Sacred Heart Seminary
- U.S. National Register of Historic Places
- Location: 2701 West Chicago Boulevard; Detroit, Michigan
- Coordinates: 42.3749°N 83.1115°W
- Built: 1923–1924
- Architect: Donaldson and Meier
- Architectural style: Collegiate Gothic Revival
- NRHP reference No.: 82000553
- Added to NRHP: December 2, 1982

Sacred Heart Major Seminary is a private Catholic seminary in Detroit, Michigan, United States. It is affiliated with the Archdiocese of Detroit.

In 2016–2017, 107 seminarians, representing eleven dioceses and two religious orders were enrolled in classes, along with 426 lay students (full and part-time). Sacred Heart Major Seminary has been accredited by the North Central Association of Colleges and Schools since 1960. The School of Theology degree programs have been accredited by the Association of Theological Schools since 1991.

== History ==
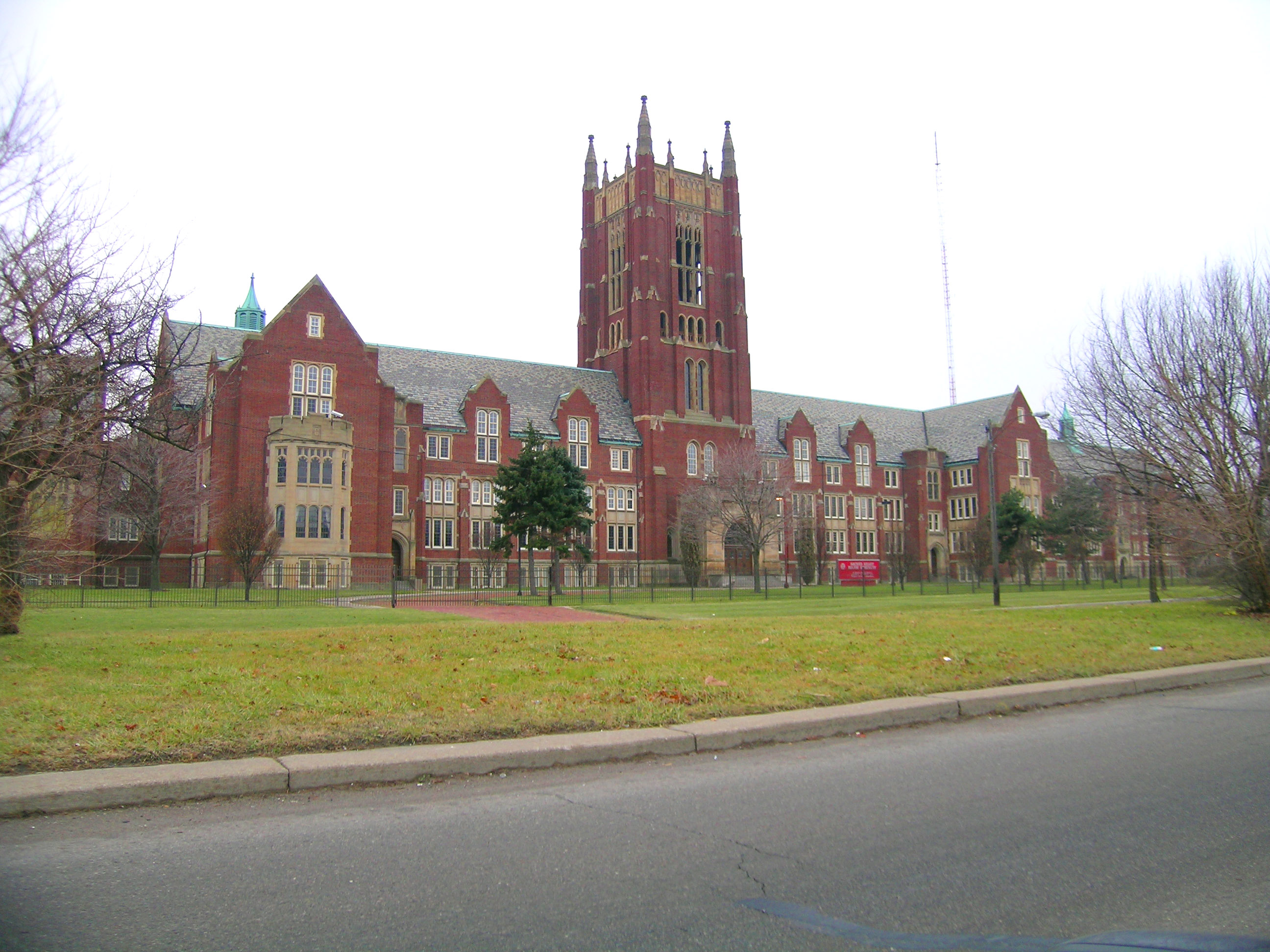
The main building of Sacred Heart Major Seminary viewed from Chicago Boulevard

=== Early years ===
Between 1804 and 1886, the leadership of the Diocese of Detroit tried three times to establish a seminary to educate and form the diocese's own priests. Each attempt failed, the last one being St. Francis Diocesan Seminary in Monroe, Michigan. It opened in 1886 and was closed by Bishop John Foley in 1889 because of the financial stress on the diocese of maintaining a seminary.

The fourth attempt at founding a seminary succeeded. On September 11, 1919, Bishop Michael J. Gallagher established Sacred Heart Seminary on Martin Place in Detroit. The Catholic population of the city of Detroit and surrounding communities was exploding as people were emigrating to Detroit to service the expanding automobile industry. Bishop Gallagher, who became bishop of the Diocese of Detroit in July 1918, realized he could not rely on priests borrowed from other dioceses, nor priests imported from Europe, to staff his parishes and meet the spiritual needs of the faithful under his care. He needed a diocesan seminary to train his own "homegrown" priests.

This first incarnation of Sacred Heart Seminary offered the first two years of high school. Junior and senior classes were added the next two years, and the first class graduated in 1922. College-level classes were added in the fall.

=== New building ===
Enrollment soon outstripped the capacity of the two cramped houses on Martin Place and later an apartment building on nearby Alexandrine Avenue. After a successful fundraising campaign in 1920–1921, Bishop Gallagher purchased twenty-four acres of farmland in February 1923 and began construction of a new facility at the corner of Chicago Boulevard and Linwood Avenue. "It's God's work! God wills it!" the bishop exclaimed. The new building, designed in Gothic Revival style (see "Architecture" below), opened on September 22, 1924, at the end of the trolley line across the street from one of the earliest Detroit suburbs, the exclusive Boston-Edison subdivision. The first college class graduated in 1926; these graduates were ordained in 1930.

Major donors to the construction of the seminary included prominent Detroit families such as the Fishers, Crowleys and Van Antwerps.

=== Mid-century years ===
Some significant happenings during Sacred Heart's mid-century decades include the granting of the academic charter and first degrees awarded, 1931; the seminary celebrates as the Detroit diocese becomes an archdiocese and Edward F. Mooney becomes the first Archbishop of Detroit, 1937; and the seminary community exceeds ninety percent participation in the federal war stamp and war bond program and receives the "Minute Man" flag, 1944. John Donovan and Henry Donnelly are consecrated Detroit auxiliary bishops in 1954, the first Sacred Heart alumni to be elevated to the episcopacy (there have been thirty-one since, see "Bishop alumni" below.

World War II enlistment and the installment of the draft had a significant effect on enrollment and subsequent graduation numbers. Throughout the 1930s, college graduation numbers averaged in the mid-to-upper thirties. In 1941, that total dropped to twenty-five, and in 1946, the college had only six graduates. The number of graduates jumped to forty-eight in 1950 and averaged around fifty per year throughout the 1950s.

The student body and faculty contributed to the war effort by raising money to purchase two ambulances for use by the armed forces. To accommodate the post-war jump in enrollment, the seminary converted three open dormitories into private rooms, adding fifty-two more rooms to house the 110 philosophy students.

A highlight for the seminarians: The college Class of 1943 raised funds through a "Movie Drive" to purchase two 35 millimeter feature film projectors. The carbon arc projectors were installed in the seminary auditorium to provide entertainment for seminarians who rarely were permitted to leave the seminary grounds during the school year. The Movie Drive was one of the culminating projects to celebrate Sacred Heart's Silver Anniversary year of 1944. (The vintage projectors remain today in the rear loft of the auditorium, although they no longer function.)

=== High school expansion ===
The seminary continued to grow and, by 1959, it became apparent that housing both high school and college programs in one building was infeasible. Construction was begun on another building, the Cardinal Mooney Latin School, on the southeast corner of the seminary grounds. This building was completed in 1961. However, in 1970, the seminary high school was closed, leaving only the college-level program.

=== Papal visit ===
The persistent lobbying of the Vatican by Cardinal Edmund Szoka, archbishop of Detroit, paid off. Pope John Paul II included a visit to Detroit during his papal trip to the United States, September 18–19, 1987. The Holy Father's first stop: Sacred Heart Seminary. He arrived by helicopter, no less, touching down on an improvised heliport on the seminary grounds, after flying into Detroit Metropolitan Airport from Rome. The pope emerged from the helicopter and greeted each seminarian individually after being welcomed by then-Fr. Allen Vigneron, who was filling in for Sacred Heart's ailing rector, Msgr. Gerald Martin.

The Holy Father's visit to Sacred Heart was followed by an address to deacons at Ford Auditorium, an address on social justice at Hart Plaza, a visit to Hamtramck, and Mass before 100,000 worshipers at the Pontiac Silverdome.

=== Educational advancements ===
In 1969, the seminary instituted the formation program for permanent deacons. Sacred Heart's charter was expanded in 1980 so to offer associate, bachelor and graduate-level degrees. The Association of Theological Schools accredited the seminary's graduate degree programs in 1991: the Master of Divinity (M.Div.), Master of Arts in Theology, and Master of Arts in Pastoral Studies (MAPS).

A significant Lilly Endowment grant allowed the Institute for Ministry's leadership, faculty members Dean Patricia Rennie Sr. Mary Lou Putrow, and Dr. Patricia Cooney Hathaway, to revamp the MAPS curriculum to include pastoral and spiritual formation for the program's lay ministry students. The endowment also provided financial aid for students. In April 2000, the first three students graduated with the revised MAPS degree.

=== Refounding ===
With the closing of the archdiocese's graduate-level St. John's Provincial Seminary in 1988, Sacred Heart was re-founded under Cardinal Edmund Szoka, archbishop of Detroit. The seminary added a Graduate School of Theology to its College of Liberal Arts and was renamed Sacred Heart Major Seminary. Cardinal Szoka commissioned extensive rehabilitation and renovation to the seminary building that included replacing 2,400 windows, replacing the electrical wiring, sandblasting the exterior, carpeting and plastering the classrooms, and expanding the parking lot to accommodate 250 vehicles.

=== Institute for Ministry ===
This same year, 1988, saw the establishment of the Institute for Ministry (IFM). Under the guidance of rector Msgr. John Nienstedt, the IFM's mission is to recruit, educate, and train lay pastoral ministers for the archdiocese. Programs offered to lay students are basic and intermediate diplomas in pastoral ministry, Associate in Ministry, MA in Theology, MA in Pastoral Ministry, and the diaconal academic program.

The institute was renamed the Institute for Lay Ministry (ILM) in September 2016, to better "reflect the core work of the institute: to form effective lay ecclesial ministers according to the norms in Coworkers in the Vineyard,” said rector Msgr. Todd Lajiness.

=== Licentiate in Sacred Theology ===
Two educational milestones were reached in 2004. The seminary established six academic chairs, including a chair of life ethics, under the leadership of rectors Most Rev. Allen Vigneron and Fr. Stephen Boguslawski. The Holy See's Congregation for Catholic Education that year approved Sacred Heart's offering of a Bachelor of Sacred Theology (STB) and a Licentiate in Sacred Theology (STL). The STB and STL are "ecclesiastical" degrees, as they are authorized by the Congregation under the seminary's aggregate relationship with the Pontifical University of St. Thomas Aquinas in Rome.

The STL has a specialization in what has become known as the "New Evangelization." Popularized by John Paul II, the New Evangelization calls Catholics into a more personal, life-changing relationship with Christ, while calling the Church to proclaim the basic gospel message to the people of the secularized first world nations who have been losing their Christian identities.

Sacred Heart's STL is considered a "pastorally-focused" program. The curriculum stresses social analysis from a Catholic perspective, family and bio-ethical issues, and modern catechetical techniques, so that graduates can express in fresh ways the teachings of the Church. At the same time, the STL is a strenuous academic program that fully prepares students for doctoral studies, the seminary maintains. (Since 2014, the program has been offered in an online/limited residency format and exclusively to priests, see "Ecclesiastical" below.)

=== Campus improvements ===
==== Dorm renovations ====
As the seminarian and lay student enrollment continued to increase beginning in the late 1990s, Sacred Heart's leadership decided to invest resources into upgrading the campus building and grounds. Twenty-nine new rooms and a priest's suite were added to the graduate dormitory in 1997. "That we have outgrown the seminarian residence rooms originally set up for the Theologate when it opened in 1988 is a great sign that God is blessing Sacred Heart's service to the Church," said rector Bishop Allen Vigneron at the time.

Work began in fall 2010 to demolish and renovate Immaculate Heart of Mary dormitory, which had been shuttered since the early 1970s. Over the following two years, ten new seminarian dorm rooms were added, along with a lounge, a new bathroom, and a laundry.

==== Technology and building improvements ====
Beginning in 2003, the seminary began to upgrade its educational technology by installing "smart classroom" technology in all of its classrooms. This first wave of technological advancements (a project which is ongoing today) included constructing a distance learning suite composed of two classrooms with videoconferencing technology: a large lecture hall with arena-style seating and a smaller seminar room. The first interactive courses were broadcast to satellite locations for fall term 2004.

The liturgy lab was updated in 2004 with an instructional whiteboard, new sound system, and a digital camera with video monitor to record and playback students homilies. To better simulate a church setting, the renovated lab incorporated a full-immersion baptismal font, fully furnished altar area, confessional, and pews.

These 2004 renovations, endorsed by Cardinal Adam Maida, archbishop of Detroit, and led by rector Fr. Stephen Boguslawski, also included expanding office space so that faculty could be located in a more central place. A lower level quadrant, which formerly housed obsolete heating and cooling equipment and a laundry room, was demolished. Replacing this "dead space" were twelve new faculty offices and a reception alcove. Offices for the new Licentiate in Sacred Theology program were located in this area.

==== Running track ====
Through the donation of an alumnus/benefactor, the seminary was able to break ground in May 2014 to construct a quarter-mile running track for the use of students, resident priests, faculty, and staff. The Bishop Walter J. Schoenherr Memorial Track which circles around the campus athletic field was dedicated in November 2014. It is named after the late auxiliary bishop of Detroit, a Sacred Heart high school and college alumnus and accomplished athlete. Beyond its general use, the seminarians have begun an annual track meet held in the fall, in which the men compete among themselves in athletic events.

==== Property expansion ====
Another significant benefactor donation allowed Sacred Heart to "expand its footprint" by purchasing six vacant city plots totaling 2.5 acres directly west of the seminary campus, in March 2016. The land was cleared of debris and an abandoned apartment building and dedicated by Archbishop Allen Vigneron in April 2017. The seminary will use the land to increase available parking space as its programs continue to expand. "By clearing the property of derelict buildings," said rector Msgr. Todd Lajiness, the purchase will help to beautify the area and stabilize property values, as well as improve campus security. As such, the rector said, the purchase "is a sign of hope for the neighborhood."

A second phase of the project will include relocating the seminary's main entrance to Chicago Boulevard by fall 2017. Ironically, the 2.5 acres once was owned by Sacred Heart but had to be sold to keep the seminary solvent during the Depression.

== Architecture ==
=== Gothic Revival ===
The seminary building is built in Gothic Revival (or Collegiate neo-Gothic) architectural style, a popular style for educational buildings of the early twentieth century. The designer is Donaldson and Meier, a prominent Detroit architectural firm that designed many iconic buildings in Detroit and southeastern Michigan from 1880 until around 1930. These include the former Chancery building of the Archdiocese of Detroit, St. Aloysius Church, the David Stott building, the original Penobscot building, and Most Holy Redeemer Church, all in Detroit, and the Beaumont Tower at Michigan State University.

=== Chapel windows ===
The windows of the Gothic main chapel are designed by the eminent stained glass design firm Emil Frei, Incorporated, of St. Louis, Missouri, with the windows being imported from the firm's studios in Munich, Germany. The sanctuary window depicts the Risen Christ surrounded by his twelve apostles, symbols of the Seven Sacraments, angels representing the evangelical counsels of poverty, chastity, and obedience, and is peaked by the coat of arms of Bishop Gallagher, the founder of the seminary. Various religious themes are represented in the side sanctuary and clerestory windows, including the Sacred Heart of Jesus and Immaculate Heart of Mary, the Life of Christ, saints who are priests or seminarians, Eucharistic saints, and the concept of sacrifice as represented in the Old Testament.

Margaret Bouchez Cavanaugh, a well-known Michigan stained glass artist, designed the windows of the college and theologate chapels in the early 1990s in a contemporary style. The chapel windows in the graduate dormitory depict the Creation Story of Genesis 1 in a "spiral, curvilinear movement," while the chapel windows in the undergraduate dormitory depict the Life of Christ along with the Descent of the Holy Spirit at Pentecoast, also in Cavanaugh's signature curvilinear style that is reminiscent of Cubism.

=== Pewabic tile ===
Sacred Heart's first-floor hallways, main chapel, and undergraduate dormitory chapel contain the largest collection of Pewabic ceramic tile in Michigan and perhaps second largest in the country after the Basilica of the National Shrine of the Immaculate Conception in Washington, D.C. The custom-made architectural tile features extravagant multi-colored floral designs and multiple religious symbols, along with the zig-zag patterning popularized by the Arts and Crafts movement.

Pewabic tile, with its innovative iridescent glazing, was developed in Detroit by Mary Case Perry Stratton at her pottery and studio in 1903. Pewabic is an active pottery, design studio, and educational center still today.

=== Chapel fire restoration ===
A near-tragic fire in the main chapel roof in February 2009 led to the decision by rector Msgr. Jeffrey Monforton and Archbishop Allen Vigneron to repair, restore, and refurbish the chapel. Throughout the spring and summer, skilled craftsmen mounted floor-to-ceiling scaffolding and applied their trades under the direction of Fr. Robert Spezia, Sacred Heart's moderator of the liturgy.

Masons repaired the stone window surrounds, painting specialists repaired and repainted the 522 plaster ceiling panels, restorers washed the interior and exterior of the stained glass windows, electricians installed new lighting, and roofers repaired the chapel's roof and replaced gutters. The oak pews were removed and refinished, and the brick and limestone walls were cleaned of soot caused by the fire and decades of candle smoke.

In particular, preservation specialists cleaned and repaired the artistically significant oak Stations of the Cross, carved in relief in the 1930s by woodworking artist from the Tyrol area of Austria. The goal of all of this effort was to return the chapel to the original condition of the 1920s chapel.

=== National Register ===
The seminary building was listed on the National Register of Historic Places in 1982.

== Rectors ==
1. Fr. Dennis L. Hayes (1919–1926)
2. Msgr. Daniel J. Ryan (1926–1940)
3. Msgr. Henry E. Donnelly (1940–1952)
4. Msgr. Albert A. Matyn (1952–1964)
5. Msgr. Francis X. Canfield (1964–1971)
6. Msgr. Thaddeus J. Ozog (1971–1976)
7. Most Reverend Bernard J. Harrington (1977–1985)
8. Msgr. F. Gerald Martin (1985–1988)
9. Most Reverend John Clayton Nienstedt (1988–1994)
10. Most Reverend Allen Henry Vigneron (1994–2003)
11. Fr. Steven C. Boguslawski, O.P. (2003–2006)
12. Most Reverend Jeffrey Marc Monforton (2006–2012)
13. Msgr. Todd J. Lajiness (2012–2021)
14. Fr. Stephen Burr (2021–present)

== Academics ==
=== Undergraduate ===
Sacred Heart Major Seminary offers degree programs at multiple levels. It offers a certificate in Catholic theology; basic diplomas in music ministry and in Catholic theology; a two-year undergraduate liberal arts degree, the Associate of Arts in Ministry; and three bachelor's programs: the Bachelor of Arts in Pastoral Theology, the Bachelor of Arts in Philosophy (an undergraduate liberal arts degree with a major in philosophy) and Bachelor of Philosophy (a two-year program with a major in philosophy for students who already possess a bachelor's degree).

=== Graduate ===
Three Master's level degrees are offered: the Master of Arts in Pastoral Studies, Master of Arts in Theology, and Master of Divinity, along with a graduate diploma in pastoral ministry.

=== Ecclesiastical ===
Sacred Heart offers two ecclesiastical degrees, a Bachelor in Sacred Theology (STB) and the Licentiate in Sacred Theology (STL). The STL, established in 2004, has a concentration in the theology and methodology of the New Evangelization. Since 2014, through the leadership of rector Msgr. Todd Lajiness, it has been offered exclusively to Catholic priests in a "blended format": most of the courses are taken online with the remaining courses taken during four five-week summer residency terms. For the summer term 2017, forty-two priests are enrolled from twenty-nine dioceses, eight religious communities, and six countries.

Both ecclesiastical degrees are conferred by the Pontifical University of Saint Thomas Aquinas, Angelicum in Rome through the faculty of SHMS. The seminary also offers a graduate certificate in the New Evangelization for those students, ordained or lay, who wish to do studies in this field without formally enrolling in the STL program.

== Miscellaneous ==
=== The "Black Jesus" Statue ===
Sacred Heart is only blocks away from the epicenter of Detroit's tragic 1967 civil disturbance. A note from Sacred Heart's rector at the time, Msgr. Francis Canfield, states that during the first day of the riot, July 23, three men entered the seminary grounds and "paint[ed] brown" the face, hands, and feet of the Sacred Heart of Jesus statue. The life-sized statue, erected in 1957 to commemorate Pope Pius XII's encyclical on devotion to the Sacred Heart, is located in a stone grotto facing the corner of Chicago Boulevard and Linwood Avenue.

The painting of the statue caused a social disturbance. Letters to the editors to the archdiocesan newspaper, Michigan Catholic, were mixed: some writers expressed outrage at what they considered vandalism; others considered the act one of ethnic pride and social and religious justice.

The features of the statue did not remain painted black for long. One newspaper account maintains "the statue went through several paintings in the weeks following the riot. Each time, the seminary repainted the statue black."

However, referring to Monsignor Canfield's notes and accounts in the Michigan Catholic, there is no evidence of multiple paintings between the initial painting on July 23 and September 14. On that date, notes Canfield, "Statue painted white by three white men." Community activists expressed outrage, believing the seminary leadership ordered the statue to be repainted white when the new school year opened. So, on September 17, "The decision was reached to repaint it black, in order to retain the symbol," states another note by Monsignor Canfield, that Christ is for all people, black and white.

The face, hands, and feet of what has become known as "The Black Jesus statue" remains painted black today (although the cast-stone statue has been repainted many times since 1967 and extensively repaired). The extremities will remain black for all time, the seminary has long decided.

As one former seminary administrator expressed, "I would suggest that the city of Detroit really has no positive symbol like it. The Sacred Heart statue is no longer just a symbol of the seminary. It is now an icon of universal appeal."

=== Bishop alumni ===
Thirty-one Sacred Heart alumni have been elevated to the episcopacy (as of June 2017). The latest graduates to become bishops are Most Rev. Gerard Battersby, former vice rector of Sacred Heart, and Most Rev. Robert Fisher, both ordained as auxiliary bishops of Detroit in January 2017. Another former vice rector of the seminary, Most Rev. Michael Byrnes, became Sacred Heart's second archbishop-alumnus (along with Archbishop Allen Vigneron) when Pope Francis named him Archbishop of Agana (Guam) in October 2016.

=== Serving the Universal Church ===
Five faculty members are making contributions to the Universal Church by serving, or having recently served, on a council or commission of the Holy See. Currently serving (as of June 2017) are Dr. Mary Healy (Pontifical Biblical Commission), Dr. Janet Smith (Pontifical Council for Promoting Christian Unity), Dr. Edward Peters (Apostolic Signatura), and Dr. Ralph Martin (Pontifical Council for the New Evangelization). Fr. John McDermott, SJ, was a member of the International Theological Commission from 2004 to 2009, while Dr. Smith was a consultor to the Pontifical Council for the Family from 1995 to 2013.
