= Archdiocese of Detroit =

Latin Catholic jurisdiction in the US

Archdiocese of Detroit Archidiœcesis Detroitensis
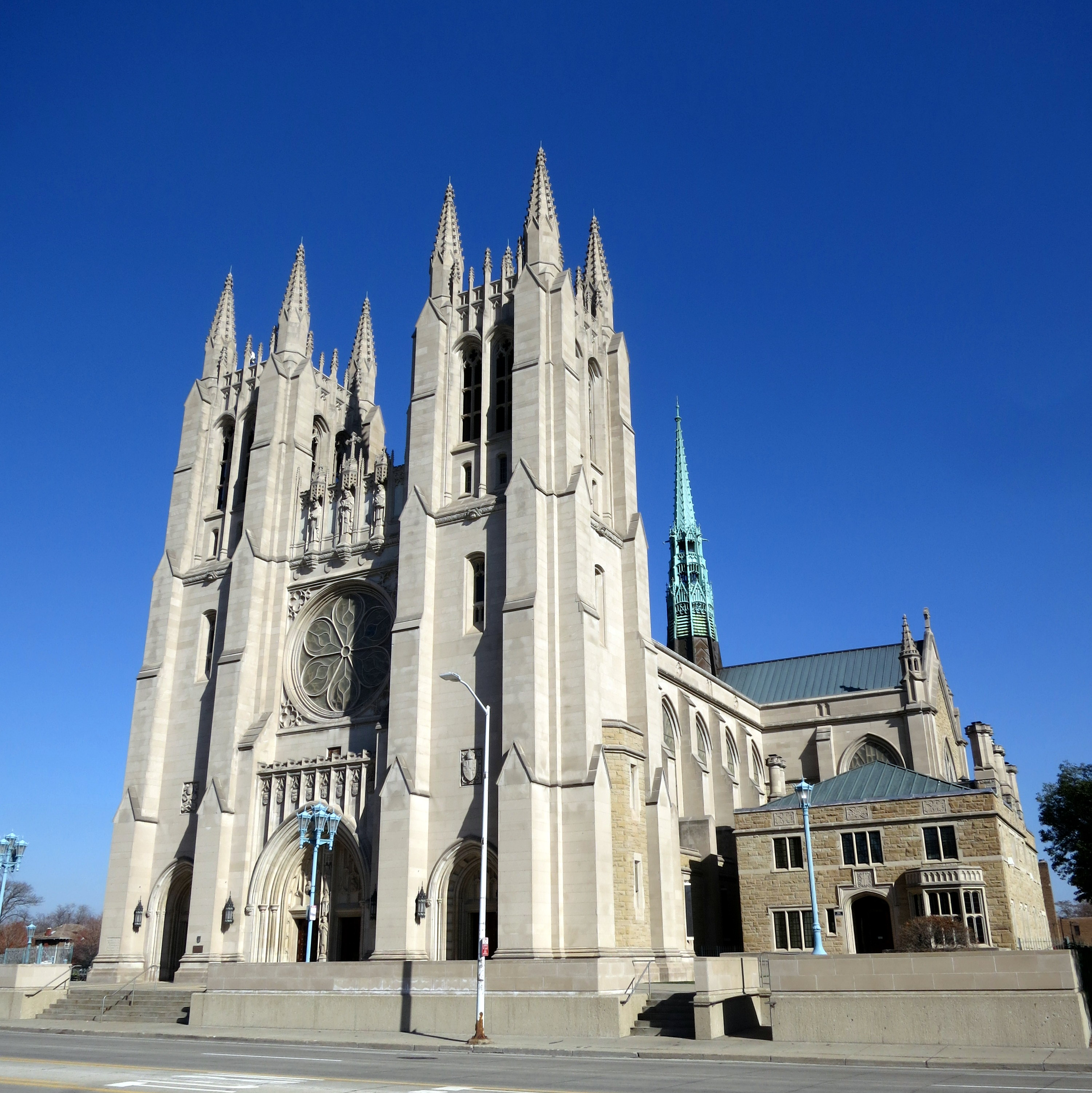
- Cathedral of the Most Blessed Sacrament in Detroit, the mother church of the archdiocese since 1938

- Coat of arms

Location
- Country: United States
- Territory: Michigan counties of Lapeer, Macomb, Monroe, Oakland, St. Clair, and Wayne
- Episcopal conference: United States Conference of Catholic Bishops
- Ecclesiastical region: Region VI
- Ecclesiastical province: Detroit

Statistics
- Area: 3,901 km^{2} (1,506 sq mi)
- Population: Total; Catholics: (as of 2025); ▼4,300,592; ▼907,605 (▼20%)
- Parishes: 214

Information
- Denomination: Catholic Church
- Sui iuris church: Latin Church
- Rite: Roman Rite
- Established: March 8, 1833 (193 years ago)
- Cathedral: Cathedral of the Most Blessed Sacrament
- Patron saint: St. Anne

Current leadership
- Pope: Leo XIV
- Archbishop: Edward Weisenburger
- Auxiliary Bishops: Robert Joseph Fisher; Paul Fitzpatrick Russell; Jeffrey M. Monforton
- Vicar General: Very Rev. Timothy Birney
- Episcopal Vicars: Monsignor Charles Kosanke; Monsignor Ronald Browne
- Judicial Vicar: Sal Palazzolo
- Bishops emeritus: Adam Joseph Cardinal Maida; Donald Hanchon; Francis R. Reiss; Allen Henry Vigneron

Map
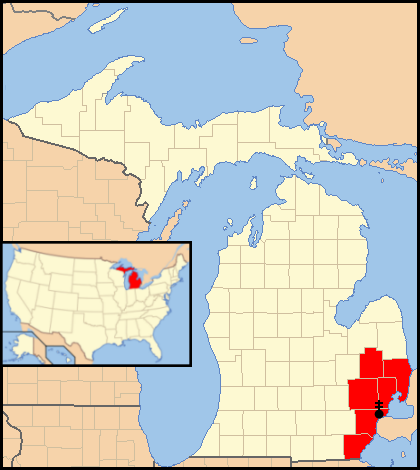

Website
- aod.org

The Archdiocese of Detroit (Latin: Archidiœcesis Detroitensis) is an archdiocese of the Catholic Church in the south-east portion of Michigan in the United States. It is the metropolitan archdiocese of the Ecclesiastical Province of Detroit, which includes all the dioceses in the state of Michigan. It was erected in 1833 and elevated to an archdiocese in 1937. The Cathedral of the Most Blessed Sacrament is the mother church. The Basilica of Sainte Anne de Détroit is the second oldest continuously operating Catholic parish in the United States, dating to 1701.

== History ==
=== 1600 to 1700 ===
The first Catholic presence in present-day Michigan was that of the French Jesuit missionaries, Charles Raymbaut and Isaac Jogues. The two priests stopped near what is now Sault Ste. Marie in 1641 to visit the Chippewa Nation.

In 1670, Claude Dablon established the first Catholic mission in the region on Mackinac Island. Jacques Marquette moved the mission off the island in 1671 to the mainland by the Straits of Mackinac. By the late 1600s, Jesuit priests were setting up missions throughout the region.

=== 1700 to 1800 ===
In 1701, the Diocese of Quebec took jurisdiction over missionary activity in Michigan, now part of the French colony of New France. In July of that year, a group of French-Canadian settlers, led by the explorer Antoine de la Mothe Cadillac, arrived at the mouth of the Detroit River. They immediately started building the first Sainte-Anne-de-Détroit Church, a small wooden structure.

When the British took control of New France after the French and Indian War ended in 1763, the Diocese of Quebec retained its jurisdiction there. After the end of the American Revolution, the British transferred control of Michigan to the new United States. In 1789, Pope Pius VI erected the Diocese of Baltimore, with jurisdiction over Catholics in the entire United States.

=== 1800 to 1850 ===
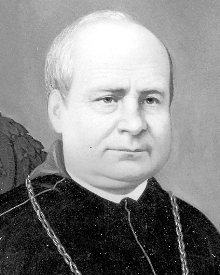
Coadjutor Bishop Lefevere

The new Michigan Territory was transferred in 1808 from the Diocese of Baltimore to the Diocese of Bardstown. It was reassigned in 1821 to the Diocese of Cincinnati.

Pope Gregory XVI erected the Diocese of Detroit on March 8, 1833, taking its territory from the Diocese of Cincinnati. He named Frederick Rese from Cincinnati as its first bishop. Ste. Anne became the cathedral for the diocese. At the time, the new diocese covered a vast area in the American Midwest and Great Plains, extending through Michigan, Wisconsin, Minnesota and the Dakotas to the Missouri River.

By 1837, Rese was incapable of administering the diocese due to mental health problems. Gregory XVI recalled him to Rome and appointed Peter Paul Lefevere as coadjutor bishop to assume its operation. When Lefevere arrived in Detroit, the city had only two parishes, with the rest of the diocese having only 25; the diocese was served by only 18 priests.

To improve the administration of the diocese, Lefevere established its first set of policies in 1843. That same year, the Vatican reduced the Diocese of Detroit to the State of Michigan, transferring the out-of-state territories to the newly-formed Diocese of Milwaukee. He won a dispute with some of the laity over the ownership of church property. Lefevere bought property throughout the diocese for future churches.

Lefevere and the Four Sisters of Charity established four orphanages, a medical hospital and a mental hospital. The Daughters of Charity became the first religious order of teaching sisters to come to Detroit. The Sisters, Servants of the Immaculate Heart of Mary came to the diocese in 1845. In 1846, Lefevere established St. Thomas Seminary in Detroit, a minor seminary that closed in 1854.

=== 1850 to 1880 ===
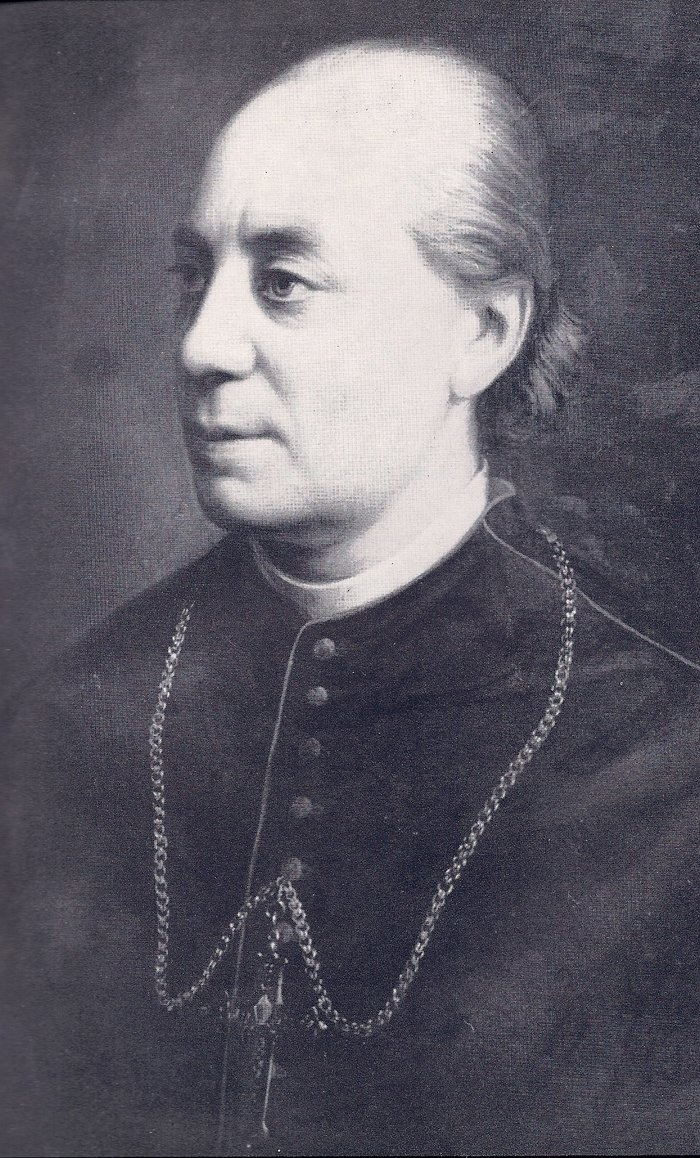
Bishop Borgess

In 1853, Pope Pius IX formed the Vicarate Apostolic of Upper Michigan, taking the Upper Peninsula of Michigan from the Diocese of Detroit. Lefevere in 1854 dedicated Saints Peter and Paul Cathedral in Detroit, which replaced Ste. Anne de Detroit. He presided over the first diocesan synod in 1859.

Lefevere died in 1869. He never became bishop of Detroit because Rese was still alive, living in a sanitarium in Europe. During Lefevere's time as coadjutor bishop, the number of parishes in Detroit increased to 11 and 160 in the rest of the diocese, with 80 priests.

To replace Lefevere as coadjutor bishop of Detroit, Pope Pius IX in 1870 named Caspar Borgess of Cincinnati. When Rese died the next year, Borgess succeeded him as bishop of Detroit.

In 1877, he invited Jesuits to establish the University of Detroit Jesuit High School in Detroit.

=== 1880 to 1900 ===
In 1882, the Vatican erected the Diocese of Grand Rapids in west central Michigan, taking its territory from the Diocese of Detroit. Borgess suspended the pastor of St. Albertus Parish in Detroit in 1885; when the congregation refused to accept their new pastor, Borgess placed the parish under interdict. These controversies and his poor relationship with his priests led Borgess to submit his resignation to the Vatican as bishop of Detroit as early as 1879. However, the Vatican would not let him resign his post until 1887.

The next bishop of Detroit was John Samuel Foley from Baltimore, named by Pope Leo XIII in 1888. During his tenure, Foley established a seminary for Polish Americans, and later healed a long schism among them. In 1889, John A. Lemke was ordained to the priesthood at St. Casimir Church in Detroit. He became the first American of Polish descent to become a priest.

=== 1900 to 1930 ===
In 1907, St. Francis's Home for Orphan Boys opened in Detroit, built at a cost of $250,000. Foley established the first parish for African Americans, St. Peter Claver, in Detroit, in 1911, although chapels and missions for African-American Catholics had existed since the late 1870s. The development of the automobile industry in Detroit led to a massive increase in population, and the number of Catholics in the diocese more than tripled during Foley's tenure. Although the number of diocesan priests nearly doubled, there still insufficient to minister to the growing population. Despite his popularity and personal charm, Foley was generally regarded as an ineffective bishop with an unsuccessful administration. Foley died in 1918, after 30 years as bishop of Detroit. The last bishop of Detroit was Bishop Michael Gallagher from Grand Rapids, appointed in 1918. In 1921, the archdiocese published a poster prohibiting sterilization and abortion services in its hospitals. This became the basis of the Ethical and Religious Directives for Catholic Health Care Services, published by the US Conference of Catholic Bishops in 1971. In 1919, Gallagher opened Sacred Heart Major Seminary in a temporary structure in Detroit to alleviate the priest shortage. In 1924, after a $4 million fundraising effort, the diocese constructed a permanent facility with a capacity for 500 seminarians.

In 1926, Gallagher appointed Charles Coughlin as pastor of the Shrine of the Little Flower Parish in Royal Oak, Michigan. Coughlin soon started a radio ministry, with Gallagher's approval. As Coughlin started gaining a large national audience for his program, his incendiary comments against Jews and capitalists became more pronounced.

=== 1930 to 1940 ===
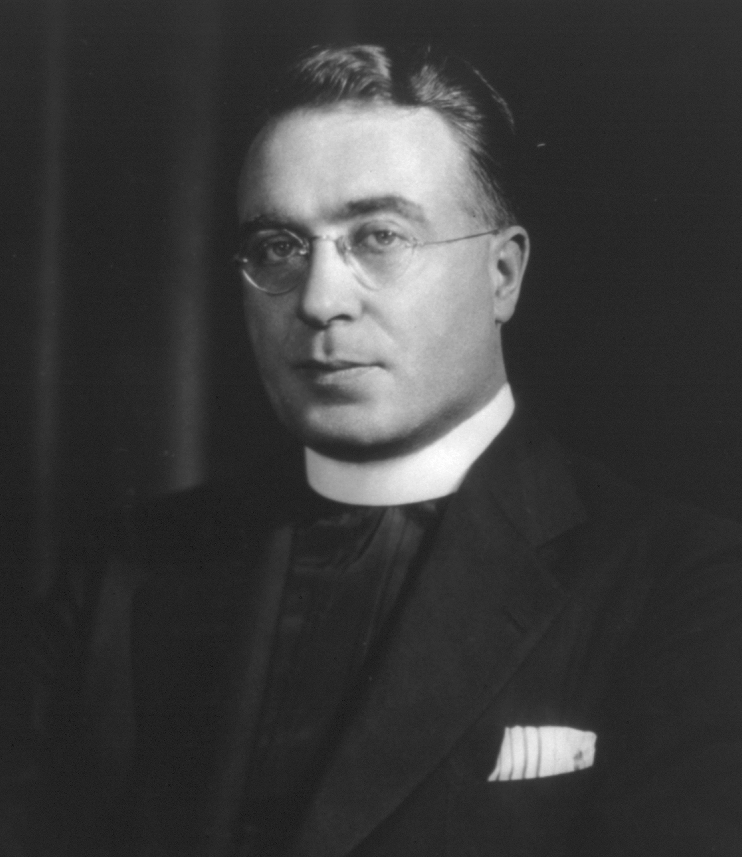
Father Coughlin (1933)

In 1930, the apostolic delegate for the United States, Cardinal Pietro Fumasoni Biondi, asked Gallagher to curb Coughlin, but Gallagher refused. "I made no mistake and have never doubted my judgment in putting him before the microphone," Gallagher said about Coughlin in 1933.

In 1935, Cardinal Amleto Giovanni Cicognani, the new apostolic delegate, tried to stop Coughlin, but Gallagher still protected him. It was rumored that Pope Pius XI refused to raise Detroit to an archdiocese due to his displeasure over Coughlin. In August 1936, Gallagher travelled to Rome. While he was en route, Coughlin denounced President Franklin D. Roosevelt as a liar. Gallagher forced Coughlin to apologize. While meeting with Pius XI, Coughlin's activities arose in the discussion. Gallagher convinced the pope not to censure Coughlin or force him to cease broadcasting. Some months later, Gallagher died in January 1937.

In May 1937, Detroit Diocese was made an Archdiocese. The Diocese of Lansing was established in south central Michigan with territory taken from Detroit. Bishop Edward Mooney from the Diocese of Rochester became Detroit's first archbishop.

In October 1937, Mooney publicly rebuked Coughlin for calling Roosevelt "stupid" over his nomination of Senator Hugo Black to the U.S. Supreme Court. This reprimand from Mooney led Coughlin to cancel his contract for 26 radio broadcasts, though he resumed broadcasting in 1938. (Coughlin's anti-Semitism became more blatant with the outbreak of World War II, leading Mooney to repeatedly rebuke him and radio stations refusing to air his broadcasts. By 1940, Coughlin had virtually no access to the airwaves, though he continued to publish his views.)

In February 1938, the Vatican erected the Diocese of Saginaw, taking territory in northeastern Michigan from the Archdiocese of Detroit and the Diocese of Grand Rapids. The Vatican also transferred three more counties from the archdiocese to the Diocese of Lansing. In April 1938, the Cathedral of the Most Blessed Sacrament in Detroit became the mother church of the new archdiocese.

In a 1939 meeting of all the archdiocesan priests, Mooney proposed the establishment of labor schools in the parishes to help "Christian workers to train themselves in principle and technique to assume the leadership in the unions which their numbers justify". An avid golf player, Mooney once remarked to his priests "If your score is over 100, you are neglecting your golf—if it falls below 90, you're neglecting your parish". Every year, he would take a group of altar boys to the opening game of the Detroit Tigers major league baseball team.

=== 1940 to 1950 ===
In 1942, the US Department of Justice informed Mooney that it was planning to indict Coughlin on charges of sedition, based on his espousal of Nazi doctrines. As part of a deal to avoid Coughlin's prosecution, Mooney ordered him to end his political activities and work solely as a parish priest. Mooney stated, "My understanding with him [Coughlin] is sufficiently broad and firm to exclude effectively the recurrence of any such unpleasant situation." Pope Pius XII created Mooney as cardinal priest of the Church of Santa Susanna in Rome in 1946.

As the northern suburbs of Detroit grew after World War II ended in 1945, Mooney added parishes in Oakland County. In 1948, he appointed Frederick Delaney to begin opening additional parishes in the rural areas of the county. That same year, Pope Pius XII named Bishop John Dearden from the Diocese of Pittsburgh as coadjutor archbishop to assist Mooney.

=== 1950 to 1980 ===
After Mooney died in 1958, Dearden automatically succeeded him as archbishop of Detroit. He was active in community causes, such as supporting equal employment opportunities and encouraging his diocese to work for better racial relations in Detroit. His commitment to racial justice frequently put him at odds with priests and lay Catholics at the parish level, who organized to fight racial integration of their neighborhoods.

In 1965, Dearden helped inaugurate Project Equality, an interfaith program that asked businesses to pledge to a policy of non-discrimination in hiring and hire employees. He also announced that the archdiocese would give preferential treatment to suppliers who provided equal employment opportunities to minority groups.

When voters amended the Michigan State Constitution in 1970 to bar all taxpayer aid to private schools in 1970, Dearden ordered all parishes to examine their finances in light of this decision and determine if their schools would be a financial drain due to reduced enrollment. Dearden ultimately ordered the closing of 56 parish schools. That same year, the Vatican transferred two counties from the Archdiocese of Detroit to the Diocese of Lansing.

After the permanent diaconate was restored during the Second Vatican Council, Dearden in 1971 became the first American bishop or archbishop to ordain married laymen as deacons.

In 1974, Brian McNaught, a reporter and columnist for the Michigan Catholic newspaper, revealed in a Detroit News article that he was gay. The Catholic then dropped his column, citing space issues in the publication. In response, McNaught filed a complaint against the Catholic with the Human Rights Commission for the City of Detroit, claiming sexual discrimination. The newspaper ultimately fired him. McNaught later founded the Detroit chapter of DignityUSA, a support organization for LGBTQ Catholics.

=== 1980 to 2000 ===
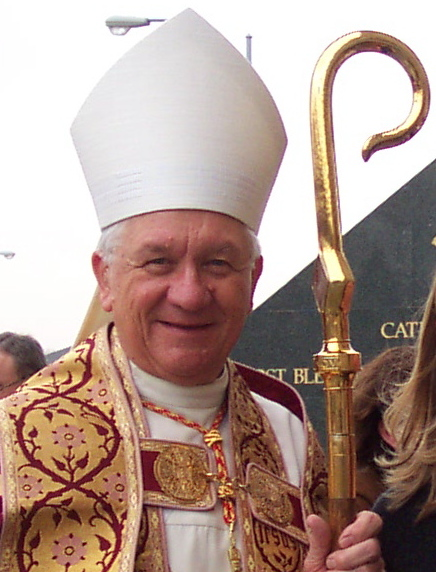
Cardinal Maida (2004)

After suffering a heart attack, Dearden retired as archbishop of Detroit in 1980. To replace Dearden, Pope John Paul II named Bishop Edmund Szoka from the Diocese of Gaylord. In 1983, he dealt with Sister Agnes Mary Mansour, who was appointed as the director of the Michigan Department of Community Health. This state agency provided Medicaid funding for abortion services for women. Szoka had given Mansour permission to take the job, but insisted that she oppose publicly funded abortion services. Mansour believed that abortion was a tragic decision for the pregnant woman, but should be legal. She refused to oppose public funding of it. Szoka then appealed to Mansour's superiors in the Sisters of Mercy to order Mansour to change her stance, but the order supported her.

In 1989, Szoka closed 30 parishes within the archdiocese and ordered 25 other parishes to improve their financial situation or face closure. The plan resulted from a five-year study that analyzed parish maintenance costs, priest availability, parish income, and parish membership. Szoka resigned as archbishop in 1990 to assume a position in the Roman Curia.

The next archbishop of Detroit was Bishop Adam Maida from the Diocese of Green Bay, appointed by John Paul II in 1990.

=== 2000 to present ===
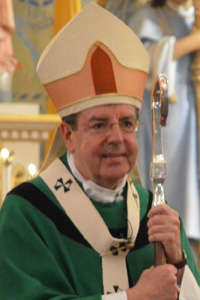
Archbishop Vigneron (2014)

In 2002, Wayne County prosecutors indicted Harry Benjamin, Robert Burkholder, Edward Olszewski, and Jason E. Sigler on criminal sexual conduct charges. The four priests, all residing outside of Michigan, had previously been incardinated in the Archdiocese of Detroit. They were all accused of sexually molesting 11 to 13-year-old boys.

In 2007, Maida relieved Auxiliary Bishop Emeritus Thomas Gumbleton of his pastoral duties at St. Leo Parish in Detroit. Gumbleton claimed that Maida was punishing him for his outspoken views on sexual abuse crimes by clergy. Maida said that he was following the Vatican rules on the retirement age of bishops. Maida retired in 2009. Pope Benedict XVI then named Bishop Allen Vigneron from the Diocese of Oakland as Maida's replacement.

In 2011, Vigneron announced that Pope Benedict XVI had approved his request to name Saint Anne as patroness of the archdiocese. In 2012, Vigneron announced a new plan to consolidate parishes in order to address declining parish membership and clergy availability within the archdiocese. Under the plan, two parishes would close in 2012 and 60 others were to consolidate into 21 parishes by the end of 2013. The archdiocese asked six additional parishes to submit plans to either repay their debts or merge with other parishes. The remaining 214 parishes were asked to submit plans to share resources or merge.

Vigneron in 2013 stated that he would not allow Catholics who support same-sex marriage to receive communion in the archdiocese. He said that taking communion while disagreeing with the church on this issue was "double-dealing that is not unlike perjury."

In 2019, Vigneron published the pastoral note "The Day of the Lord". This note ended required Sunday sports practices and games in Catholic schools so that students could spend that day focused on prayer, family and rest. Vigneron announced in June 2020 that the archdiocese was restructuring 200 parishes into 60 to 80 parish families to deal with the shortage of priests.

In May 2019, Michigan Attorney General Dana Nessel indicted two priests who had previously served in the archdiocese:

- Neil Kalina, a former priest at St. Kiernan Parish in Shelby Township, was indicted on four counts of second-degree criminal sexual conduct in 1984 with a boy between the ages of 12 and 14 and for supplying the boy with cocaine and marijuana. He had left the priesthood in 1993 after a 1985 conviction in Michigan for drug possession. Kalina was convicted and sentenced in July 2022 to up to 15 years in state prison.
- Patrick Casey was charged with raping a 24-year-old man in 2013. At the time of the assault, Casey was counseling the victim, who was experiencing suicidal feelings. In October 2019, Casey pled guilty to a misdemeanor charge of aggravated assault and was sentenced to 45 days in jail.

In July 2019, Joseph Baker was indicted on first-degree criminal sexual conduct with someone under age 13. The archdiocese had previously placed limits on his public ministry. Baker was convicted in October 2022 and sentenced to up to 15 years in prison.

In 2020, the archdiocese fired Terry Gonda, the music director at St. John Fisher Parish in Auburn Hills, for being married to another woman. In August 2020, Vigneron banned DignityUSA and Fortunate Families, a ministry for families of LGBTQ Catholics, from gathering at archdiocesan churches or having priests perform mass for them. He stated that the two groups were incompatible with the virtue of chastity.

In September 2020, Gary Berthiaume was charged with sexually assaulting a 14-year-old at Our Lady of Sorrows Parish in Farmington during the 1970s. He was additionally charged in June 2021 with sexually assaulting two young teenagers at St. Joseph Catholic Church in Wyandotte during the same time period. Berthiaume pleaded guilty in November 2021 to two counts of second-degree criminal sexual conduct and no contest to one count of gross indecency in the two cases. He was sentenced to 16 to 17 months in prison.

Vigneron wrote a pastoral letter in 2024 to the leaders of Catholic schools and other institutions in the archdiocese. It stated that all their employees, students, and youth program participants must "...respect their God-given biological sex." This meant that transgender individuals had to use restrooms and follow dress codes that corresponded to their biological sex. VigneIn a podcast following his letter, Vigneron called acceptance of transgender individuals by society as "...a toxin that's been deposited in our culture" and compared transness to a virus.

On February 11, 2025, Pope Francis accepted Vigneron's retirement as archbishop of Detroit and named Bishop Edward Weisenburger from the Diocese of Tucson to succeed him.

On November 19, 2026, pastoral care of the Cayman Islands was transferred from the Archdiocese of Detroit to the Archdiocese of Miami.

== Bishops and archbishops ==
=== Bishops ===
1. Frederick Rese (1833–1871)
  - Peter Paul Lefevere (coadjutor bishop 1841–1869); died before his succession as bishop
2. Caspar Borgess (1871–1887)
3. John Samuel Foley (1888–1918)
4. Michael Gallagher (1918–1937)

=== Archbishops ===
1. Cardinal Edward Aloysius Mooney (1937–1958)
2. Cardinal John Francis Dearden (1958–1980)
3. Cardinal Edmund Casimir Szoka (1981–1990), appointed President of the Prefecture for the Economic Affairs of the Holy See and later President of the Pontifical Commission for Vatican City State and Governatorate of Vatican City State
4. Cardinal Adam Joseph Maida (1990–2009)
5. Allen Henry Vigneron (2009–2025)
6. Edward Weisenburger (2025–present)

=== Current auxiliary bishops ===
- Robert Joseph Fisher (2016–present)
- Paul Fitzpatrick Russell (2022–present), holds the title of Archbishop ad personam; not currently exercising public ministry.
- Jeffrey M. Monforton (2023–present)

=== Former auxiliary bishops ===
- Edward D. Kelly (1910–1919), appointed Bishop of Grand Rapids
- Joseph C. Plagens (1924–1935), appointed Bishop of Sault-Sainte Marie-Marquette
- Stephen Stanislaus Woznicki (1937–1950), appointed Bishop of Saginaw
- Allen James Babcock (1947–1954), appointed Bishop of Grand Rapids
- Alexander M. Zaleski (1950–1964), appointed Coadjutor Bishop of Lansing and subsequently succeeded to that see
- John Anthony Donovan (1954–1967), appointed Bishop of Toledo
- Henry Edmund Donnelly (1954–1967)
- Joseph M. Breitenbeck (1965–1969), appointed Bishop of Grand Rapids
- Walter Joseph Schoenherr (1968–1995)
- Thomas Gumbleton (1968–2006)
- Joseph Leopold Imesch (1973–1979), appointed Bishop of Joliet in Illinois
- Arthur Henry Krawczak (1973–1982)
- Dale Joseph Melczek (1982–1995), appointed Coadjutor Bishop of Gary, and subsequently succeeded to that see after collateral assignment as Apostolic Administrator of the Diocese of Gary (1992–1995)
- Patrick R. Cooney (1982–1989), appointed Bishop of Gaylord
- Moses Anderson, SSE (1982–2003)
- Bernard Joseph Harrington (1993–1998), appointed Bishop of Winona
- Kevin Michael Britt (1993–2002), appointed Coadjutor of Grand Rapids and subsequently succeeded to that see
- John Clayton Nienstedt (1996–2001), appointed Bishop of New Ulm
- Allen Henry Vigneron (1996–2003), appointed Coadjutor Bishop of Oakland and subsequently succeeded to that see; later appointed Archbishop of Detroit
- Leonard Paul Blair (1999–2003), appointed Bishop of Toledo
- Earl Boyea (2002–2008), appointed Bishop of Lansing
- John M. Quinn (2003–2008), appointed Coadjutor Bishop of Winona and subsequently succeeded to that see
- Francis R. Reiss (2003–2015)
- Walter A. Hurley (2003–2005), appointed Bishop of Grand Rapids
- Daniel E. Flores (2006–2009), appointed Bishop of Brownsville
- Michael J. Byrnes (2011–2016), appointed Coadjutor Archbishop of Agana (Guam) and subsequently succeeded to that see
- Donald Hanchon (2011–2023)
- Gerard William Battersby (2016–2023), appointed Bishop of La Crosse
- Arturo Cepeda (2011–2025), appointed Auxiliary Bishop of San Antonio

=== Other archdiocesan priests who became bishops ===
- Camillus Paul Maes, appointed Bishop of Covington in 1884
- Francis Clement Kelley, appointed Bishop of Oklahoma City in 1924
- William Francis Murphy, appointed Bishop of Saginaw in 1938
- Kenneth Edward Untener, appointed Bishop of Saginaw in 1980
- Alexander Joseph Brunett, appointed Bishop of Helena in 1994
- Jeffrey Marc Monforton, appointed Bishop of Steubenville in 2012
- Robert John McClory, appointed Bishop of Gary in 2019

== Churches and regions ==
The Archdiocese of Detroit is divided into four administrative regions:

- Central – Detroit
- Northeast – Macomb and St. Clair Counties
- Northwest – Oakland and Lapeer Counties
- South – Monroe County, the Downriver area of Detroit, and the cities of Dearborn, Livonia, and Plymouth

Each region is divided into vicariates. In 2021, to promote a more missionary focus, the archdiocese grouped its parishes into families. Each family consists of three or more parishes that are close to each other.

The Cathedral of the Most Blessed Sacrament has served as the mother church of the archdiocese since 1938. Earlier cathedrals were:

- Ste. Anne de Detroit, 1833 to 1848
- Sts. Peter and Paul, 1848 to 1877
- St. Aloysius (as pro-cathedral), 1877 to 1890
- St. Patrick, 1890 to 1938

== Schools ==
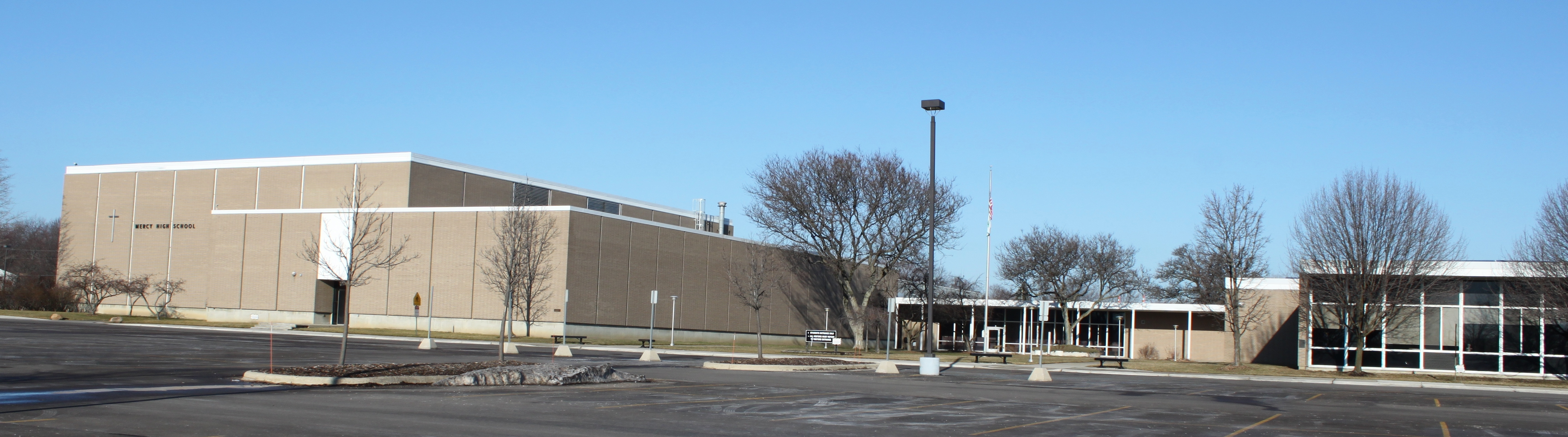
Mercy High School in Farmington Hills, Michigan

In 1964, the archdiocese operated 360 schools with an enrollment of 203,000 students. These included 110 primary schools and 55 secondary schools. The Catholic school population decreased over the decades due to the increase of charter schools, the rise in tuition at Catholic schools, the small number of African-American Catholics, the exodus of White Catholics to the suburbs, and the decreased number of teaching nuns.

As of 2024, the archdiocese was operating 24 secondary schools and 62 primary schools, serving 27,000 students.

== Universities and colleges ==
- Madonna University- Livonia, Michigan
- Sacred Heart Major Seminary - Detroit
- University of Detroit Mercy - Detroit

== Photo gallery ==
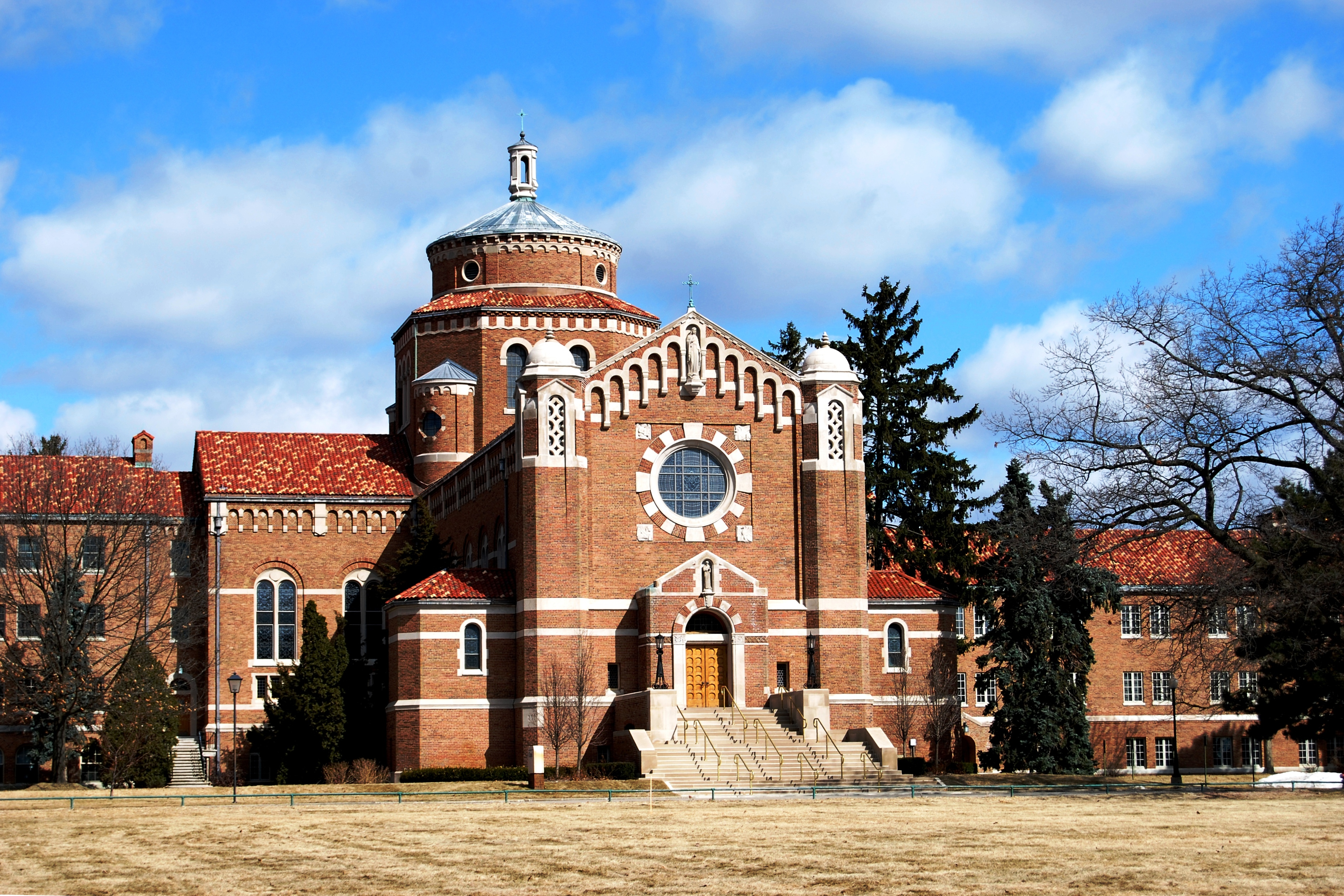
Chapel of the Felician Sisters, Livonia

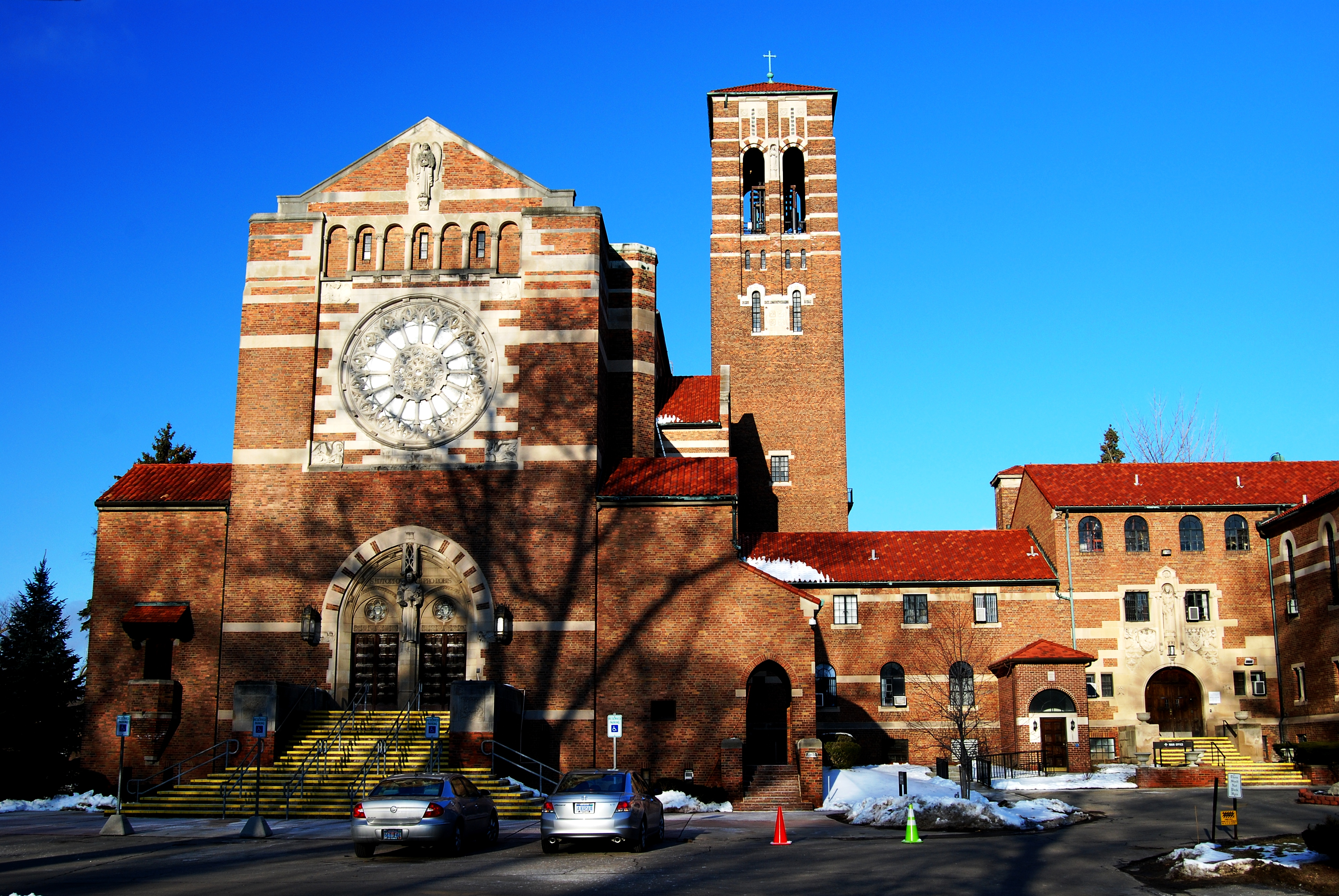
The former Duns Scotus College, Southfield

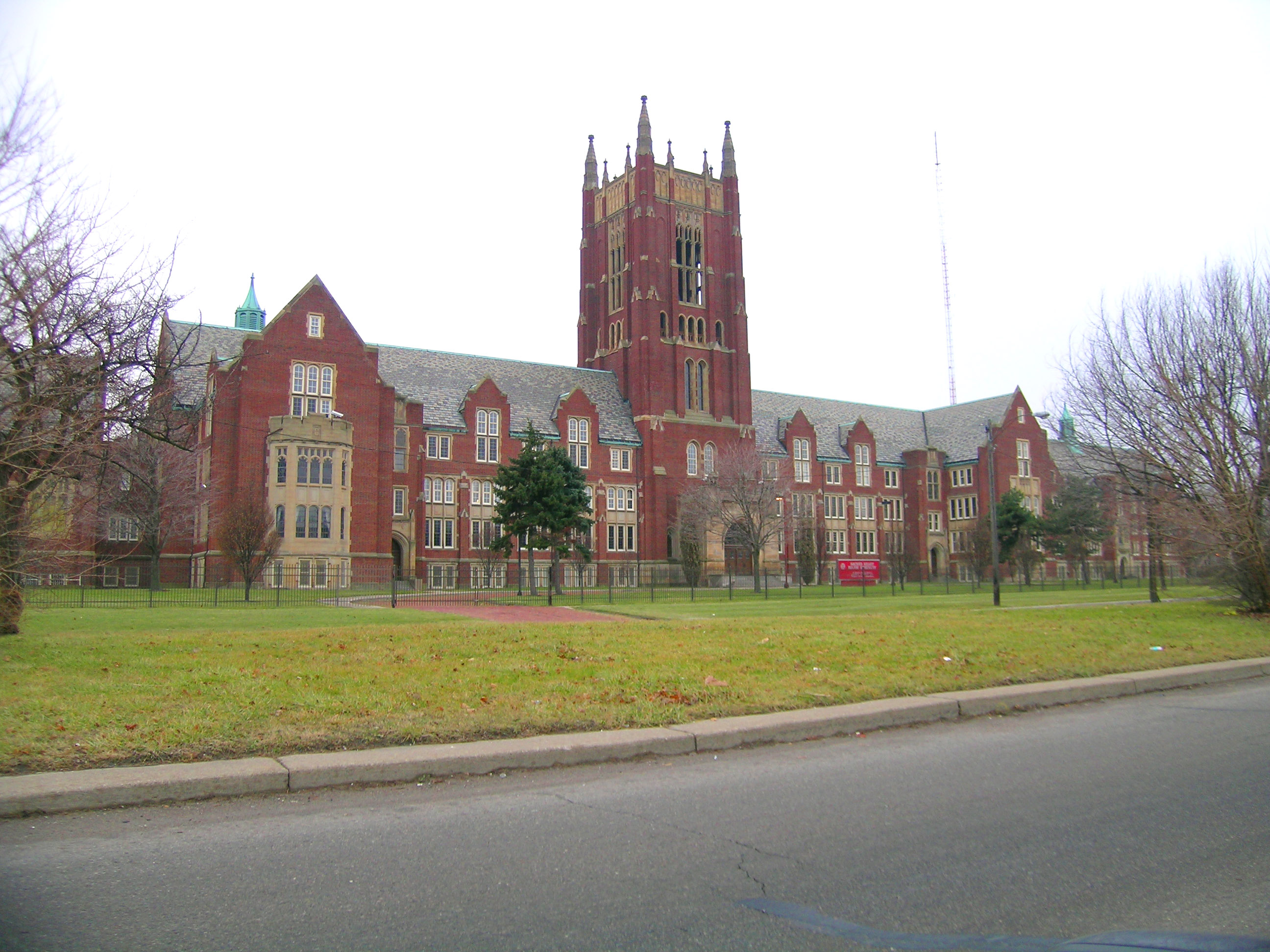
Sacred Heart Major Seminary, Detroit

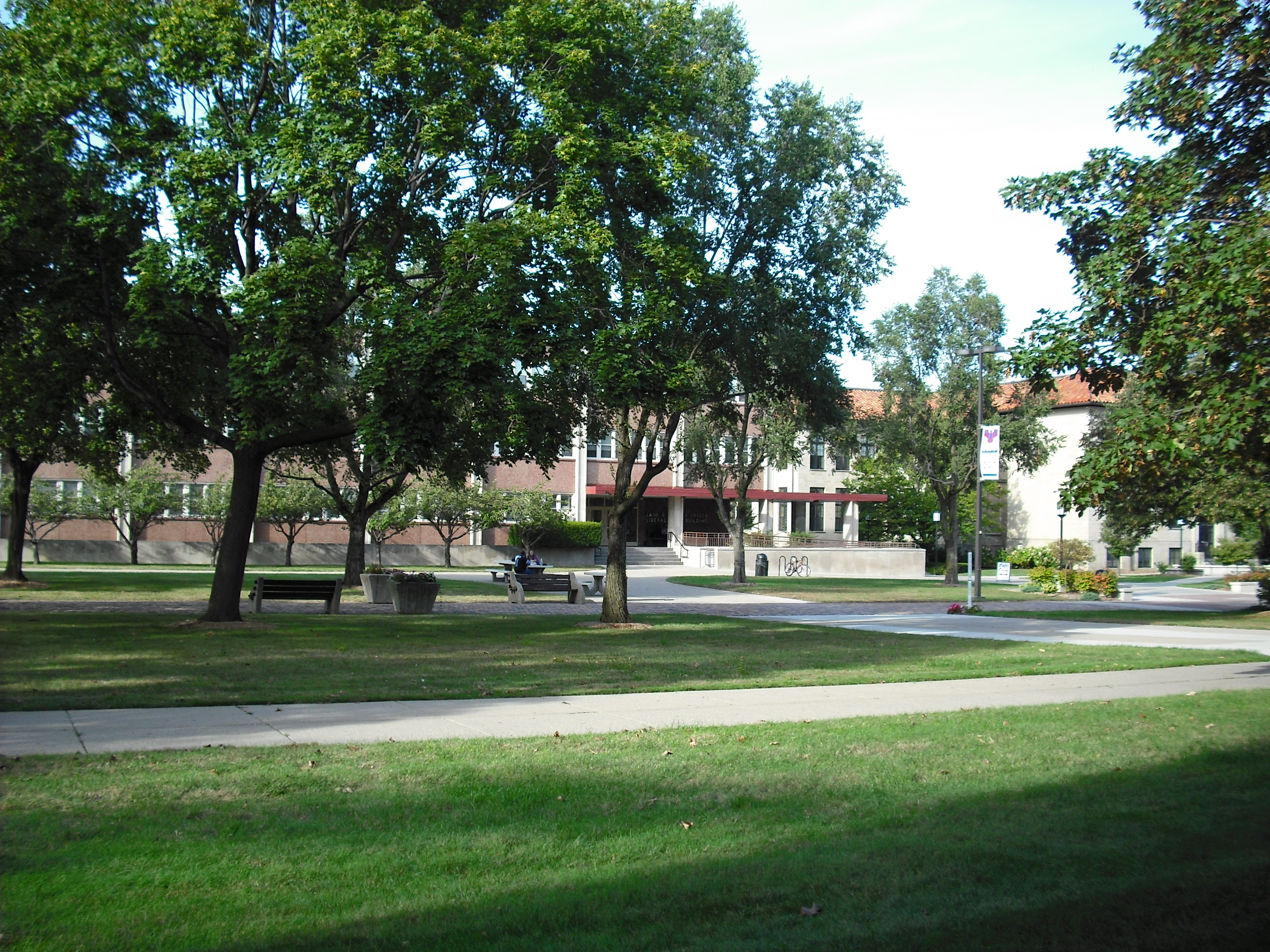
University of Detroit Mercy, Detroit

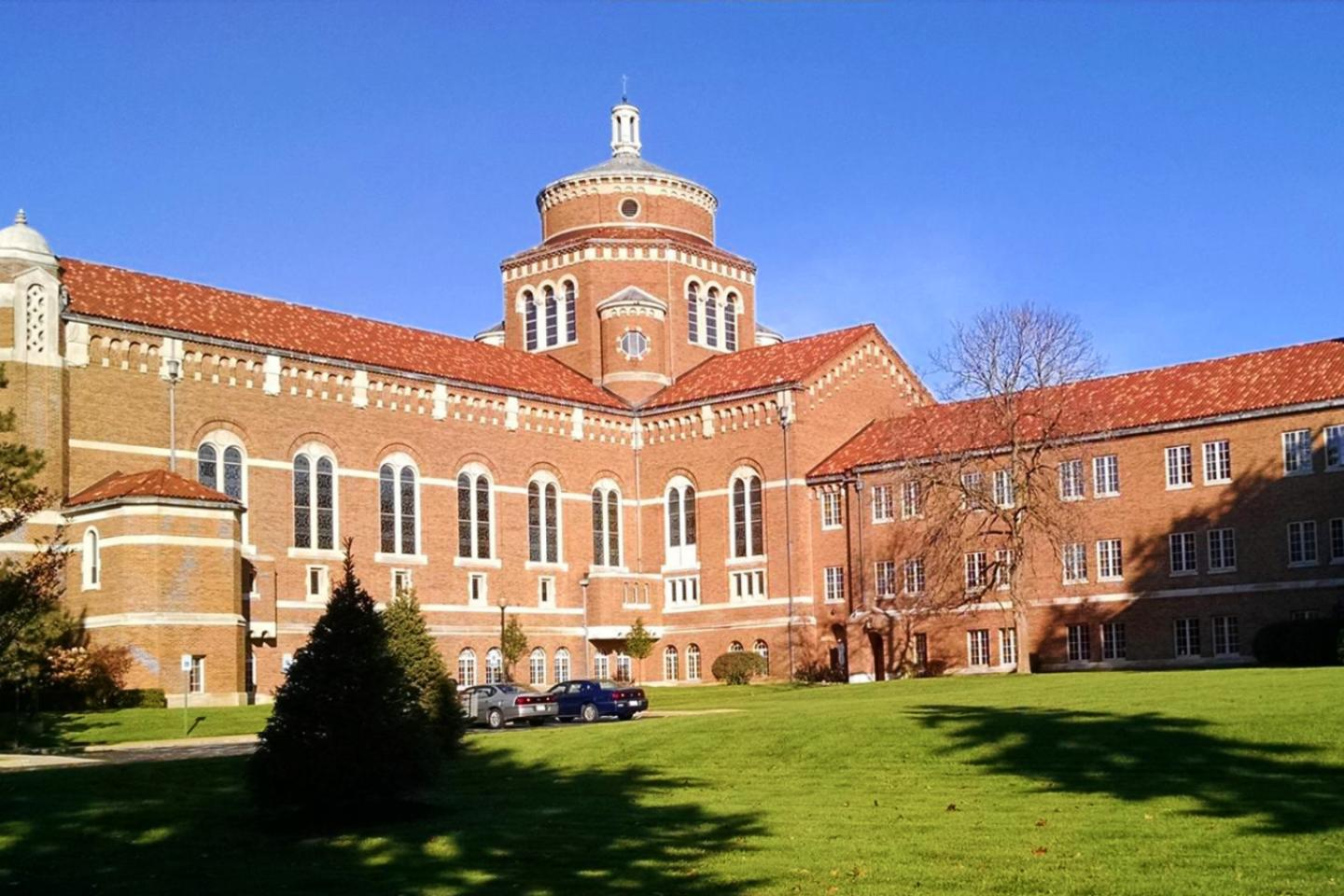
Madonna University, Livonia

== Suffragan sees ==
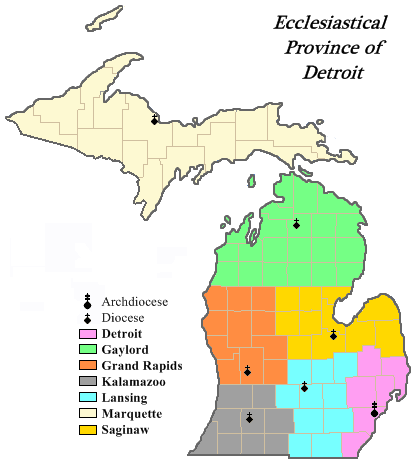
Ecclesiastical Province of Detroit

- Diocese of Gaylord
- Diocese of Grand Rapids
- Diocese of Kalamazoo
- Diocese of Lansing
- Diocese of Marquette
- Diocese of Saginaw

== References and further reading ==
- Godzak, Roman (2000). Archdiocese of Detroit (Images of America). Arcadia Publishing. ISBN 978-0-7385-0797-2.
- Godzak, Roman (2004). Catholic Churches of Detroit (Images of America). Arcadia Publishing. ISBN 978-0-7385-3235-6.
- Godzak, Roman (2000). Make Straight the Path: A 300 Year Pilgrimage Archdiocese of Detroit. Editions du Signe. ISBN 978-2-7468-0145-5.
- Hill, Eric J.; Gallagher, John (2003). AIA Detroit: The American Institute of Architects Guide to Detroit Architecture. Wayne State University Press. ISBN 978-0-8143-3120-0.
- Muller, Herman Joseph (1976). The University of Detroit 1877-1977: A Centennial History. University of Detroit. ASIN B0006CVJ4S.
- Tentler, Leslie Woodcock (1992). Seasons of Grace: A History of the Catholic Archdiocese of Detroit. Wayne State University Press. ISBN 978-0-8143-2106-5.
- Tutag, Nola Huse; Hamilton, Lucy (1988). Discovering Stained Glass in Detroit. Wayne State University Press. ISBN 978-0-8143-1875-1.
