= List of public art in Lake County, Indiana =

This is a list of public art in Lake County, Indiana.

This list applies only to works of public art accessible in an outdoor public space. For example, this does not include artwork visible inside a museum.

Most of the works mentioned are sculptures. When this is not the case (i.e. sound installation, for example) it is stated next to the title.

== Crown Point ==
Title	Artist	Year	Location/GPS Coordinates	Material	Dimensions	Owner	Image
The Doughboy			Maplewood Cemetery, Veteran's Garden	Indiana limestone		Lake County Historical Society	
Heroes Memorial		2003	Maplewood Cemetery	Bronze			
Reverend Dr. Jack Hyles and Mrs. Hyles	Richard R. Miller		Hyles–Anderson College, Founder's Park	Bronze			
Women in Law Enforcement Memorial	Mitch Markovitz	2010	Law Enforcement Resource Center, 2450 W. 93rd Ave.	Granite			

== Dyer ==
Title	Artist	Year	Location/GPS Coordinates	Material	Dimensions	Owner	Image
Untitled (Kirk's Kustom Detailing Sculpture)			Corner of Sheffield & Matteson 41°29′54.66″N 87°31′9.07″W			Kirk's Kustom Detailing	

== East Chicago ==
Title	Artist	Year	Location/GPS Coordinates	Material	Dimensions	Owner	Image
Miguel Hidalgo y Costilla			Washington Park, 142nd & Parrish Ave.				
Industrial Strength (mural)	Steve Segura & Marco Salazar		524 W. Chicago Ave.			Clark Material & Handling	
Tribute to Firefighters (mural)	Hector Marin		Joseph's Hardware 41°37′46.52″N 87°28′46.58″W			Joseph's Hardware	
Jesus			St. Catherine's Hospital Birthing Center			St. Catherine's Hospital	
United Future (mural)	Children & Judy O'Bannon		Pollution Control Industries, 4343 Kennedy Ave				
Knowledge is Power (mural)	Tom Torluemke	2000	Ivy Tech State College 41°38′21.69″N 87°28′2.46″W				

== Gary ==
Title	Artist	Year	Location/GPS Coordinates	Material	Dimensions	Owner	Image
Elbert H. Gary	Bryant Baker	1957	City Hall 41°36′13.21″N 87°20′12.9″W	Bronze	Figure: approx. 8 x 3 x 3 ft.	City of Gary	
Entrance Relief of Cathedral of Holy Angels	Unknown	1950	Cathedral of the Holy Angels	Limestone	Approx. 7 ft. x 19 ft. x 4 in.	Roman Catholic Diocese of Gary	
The Fusion	Omri Amrany	2006	Genesis Convention Center 41°36′10.09″N 87°20′15.68″W				
(Indiana University North Torches)	Fred Collins Architects		Indiana University North Gateway 41°33′31.38″N 87°20′12.72″W	Metal & Stone		Indiana University	
Marquette	Henry Hering	1931–1932	Marquette Park	Bronze	Figure: approx. 134 x 41 x 50 in.	City of Gary	
Octave Chanute	Michael Dente		Marquette Park	Bronze			
Quentin Smith			Marquette Park	Bronze			
St. Mary of the Lake	James M. Turner	1961	St. Mary of the Lake Catholic Church41°36′1.12″N 87°15′55.35″W	Marble and tile	Approx. 12 ft. x 44 in. x 5 in.	Roman Catholic Diocese of Gary	
Soaring Interchange	Richard Hunt	1985	Gary Transportation Center 41°36′15.43″N 87°20′18.41″W	Stainless steel	Figure: approx. 8 ft. x 22 1/2 in. x 22 1/2 in.	City of Gary	
Statue of Liberty		1950	City Hall	Metal	Figure: approx. 8 ft. x 22 1/2 in. x 22 1/2 in.	City of Gary	

== Hammond ==
Title	Artist	Year	Location/GPS Coordinates	Material	Dimensions	Owner	Image
A Sunday Afternoon on the Island of La Grande Jatte (mural)	Cande Sagan	2002	Ruth St & Hohman Ave 41°36′24.28″N 87°31′20.18″W				
All Saints Catholic Church Relief and Angels	Unknown	1929	All Saints Catholic Church 41°36′59.67″N 87°30′52.35″W	Limestone	Crucifixion relief: approx. 4 ft. x 3 ft. x 6 in.; Each north entrance relief panel: approx. 3 ft. x 2 1/2 ft. x 3 in.; Each angel: approx. H. 4 ft.	Roman Catholic Diocese of Gary	
Evolution of Industry and Growth in Northwest Indiana (mural)	Geoffry Smalley & Crazy In Style		Northern Indiana Arts Association				
Man of Steel	Hermann Gurfinkel	1976	Harrison Park 41°36′22.29″N 87°31′18.27″W	Steel	Sculpture: approx. 21 x 10 x 16 ft.	City of Hammond	
The Persistence Of Memory (mural)	Wendy Gresmer	2001	Yale Building, 200 Russel St.		h 17 ft x w 20 ft		
The Rotunda	David Black	1999	Hohman Ave & Rimbach St. 41°37′6.13″N 87°31′19.7″W	Aluminium & Granite	H. 27 ft	City of Hammond	
Touching Fingers (mural)	Cande Sagan		Law Office of Robert Sorge, Hohman Ave.				

== Merrillville ==
Title	Artist	Year	Location/GPS Coordinates	Material	Dimensions	Owner	Image
St. Stephen the Marytr	Mostafa Naguib	ca. 1970	St. Stephen the Martyr Catholic Church 41°30′33.75″N 87°22′35.39″W	Painted concrete	Figure: approx. 7 x 2 x 2 ft.	St. Stephen the Martyr Catholic Church	

== Munster ==
Title	Artist	Year	Location/GPS Coordinates	Material	Dimensions	Owner	Image
Grotto	Alberto Arrughini	ca. 1957	Carmelite Monastery and Shrines	Marble, Stone, Sponge Rock, Geodes, Corals & White Barite Stone	Mary: approx. 7 ft. x 2 ft. x 20 in.; Bernadette: approx. 42 x 14 x 23 in.; Grotto: approx. 30 x 60 x 30 ft.	Discalced Carmelites	
Our Lady of Ludzmierz and Christ in Meditation	J.S. Kenar	1981	Carmelite Monastery and Shrines	Wood	2 sculptures. Christ: approx. 5 ft. x 22 in. x 25 in. Our Lady: approx. H. 2 1/2 ft.	Discalced Carmelites	
Our Lady of Mt. Carmel	Alberto Arrughini	1959	Carmelite Monastery and Shrines	Marble & Metal	Sculpture: approx. 6 ft. x 4 ft. x 38 in.	Discalced Carmelites	
Pilgrims	Alberto Arrughini	1961	Carmelite Monastery and Shrines	Marble	2 sculptures. Woman: approx. 45 x 18 x 24 in., Man: approx. 45 x 20 x 22 in.	Discalced Carmelites	
St. Therese with Father	Alberto Arrughini	1960	Carmelite Monastery and Shrines	Marble	Approx. 56 x 48 x 30 in.	Discalced Carmelites	
Sacred Heart	Alberto Arrughini	1961	Carmelite Monastery and Shrines	Marble	Sculpture: approx. 7 1/2 x 5 x 2 1/2 ft.	Discalced Carmelites	

== Whiting ==
Title	Artist	Year	Location/GPS Coordinates	Material	Dimensions	Owner	Image
John the Forerunner of Jesus	Joseph Slinkard, Pedro Teran	1955	St. John the Baptist Catholic Church (Whiting, Indiana)	Limestone	Approx. 165 in. x 4 ft. and 20 in.	St. John the Baptist Catholic Church	
Mary and the Child	Joseph Slinkard, Pedro Teran	1955	Marian Theatre Guild	Limestone	Approx. 15 x 3 x 1 1/2 ft.	St. John the Baptist Catholic Church	
