= Bernard Joseph Harrington =

American Roman Catholic bishop (1933–2025)

His Excellency, The Most Reverend Bernard Joseph Harrington
- Bishop Emeritus of Winona
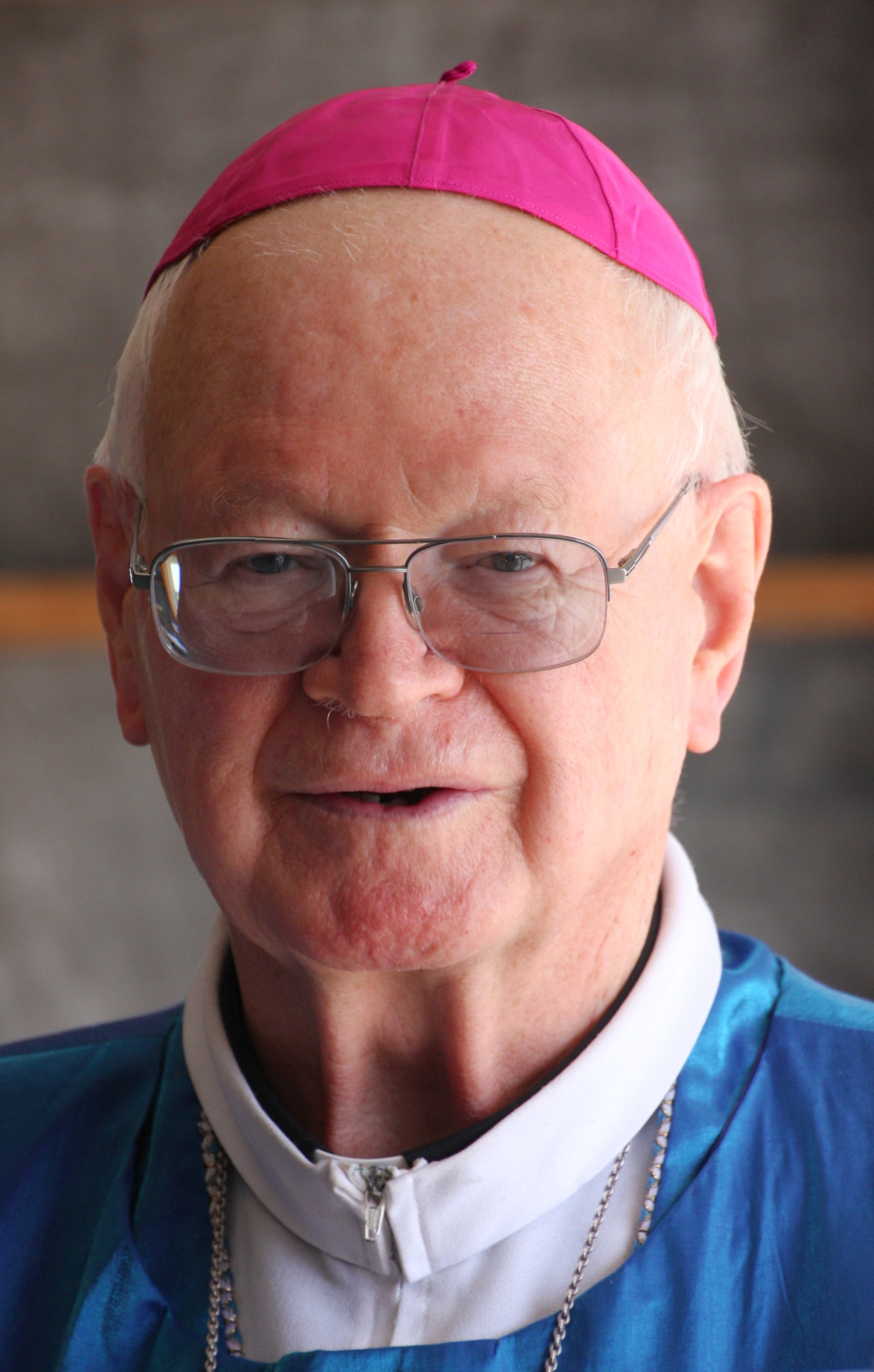
- Harrington in 2017
- Church: Roman Catholic
- Archdiocese: Saint Paul and Minneapolis
- Diocese: Winona
- Appointed: November 4, 1998
- Installed: January 6, 1999
- Retired: May 7, 2009
- Predecessor: John George Vlazny
- Successor: John M. Quinn
- Previous posts: Auxiliary Bishop of Detroit and Titular Bishop of Uzalis (1993–1998)

Orders
- Ordination: June 6, 1959 by John Francis Dearden
- Consecration: January 6, 1994 by Adam Maida, Dale Joseph Melczek, and Walter Joseph Schoenherr

Personal details
- Born: September 6, 1933 Detroit, Michigan, U.S.
- Died: August 30, 2025 (aged 91) Livonia, Michigan, U.S.
- Education: Sacred Heart Seminary; Catholic University of America
- Motto: Have life more abundantly

Styles of Bernard Joseph Harrington
- Reference style: His Excellency; The Most Reverend
- Spoken style: Your Excellency
- Religious style: Bishop

Bernard Joseph Harrington (September 6, 1933 – August 30, 2025) was an American prelate of the Roman Catholic Church. He served as bishop of the Diocese of Winona in Minnesota from 1998 to 2009 and as an auxiliary bishop of the Archdiocese of Detroit in Michigan from 1993 to 1998.

== Biography ==
=== Early life ===
Bernard Harrington was born on September 6, 1933, in Detroit, Michigan, to John and Norah (née Cronin) Harrington; he had two brothers, John and Timothy, and one sister, Irene. His parents were immigrants from Bantry Bay, County Cork, in the Republic of Ireland.

Harrington studied at Sacred Heart Seminary in Detroit and St. John's Provincial Seminary in Plymouth, Michigan. He graduated from the Catholic University of America with a Master of Education degree.

=== Priesthood ===
On June 6, 1959, Harrington was ordained to the priesthood in the Cathedral of the Most Blessed Sacrament in Detroit for the Archdiocese of Detroit.

During his priestly ministry, Harrington served as archdiocesan assistant superintendent of schools and pastor of Holy Name Parish in Birmingham, Michigan. From 1977 to 1985, he was rector of Sacred Heart Seminary. He later became director of the Department of Formation and pastor of St. Rene Goupil Parish in Sterling Heights, Michigan, in 1984.

=== Auxiliary Bishop of Detroit ===
On November 23, 1993, Pope John Paul II appointed Harrington as an auxiliary bishop of Detroit and titular bishop of Uzalis. He was consecrated at the Cathedral of the Most Blessed Sacrament on January 6, 1994, by Archbishop Adam Maida, with Bishops Dale Melczek and Walter Schoenherr serving as co-consecrators. Harrington chose as his episcopal motto: "Have life more abundantly" (John 10:10).

As auxiliary bishop, Harrington served as vicar of the Office of Pastoral Services for Parishes in the archdiocesan curia, episcopal liaison for the Pope John Paul II Cultural Center in Washington, D.C., and regional bishop for Macomb County, Michigan and St. Clair County, Michigan.

=== Bishop of Winona ===
On November 4, 1998, John Paul II named Harrington as the seventh bishop of Winona. He was installed on January 6, 1999.

Within the United States Conference of Catholic Bishops (USCCB), Harrington chaired the Committee on Education and sat on the Ad Hoc Committee on Catholic Bishops and Catholic Politicians. He was also a member of the Priestly Life and Ministry Committee and its liaison to the Subcommittee for Lay Ministry.

On April 15, 2008, Harrington commented on the plans of Kathy Redig, a chaplain in the diocese, to undergo an unauthorized ordination. Harrington said that Redig would, in effect, be "self-excommunicating" herself from the Catholic Church by this action. In May 2009, Harrington criticized the University of Notre Dame for inviting US President Barack Obama to its commencement ceremonies. Harrington stated that Notre Dame:

...is choosing to defy the bishops of the United States and turn its back on the Catholic community in its continual defense of the right-to-life. The university's stance is similar to that of Catholic politicians who say that they are pro-life and then support legislation and vote for programs that foster abortion.

=== Retirement and death ===
Harrington in 2018

On October 15, 2008, Pope Benedict XVI named Bishop John M. Quinn as coadjutor bishop of Winona. On May 7, 2009, Benedict XVI accepted Harrington's resignation as bishop of Winona.

Harrington died on August 30, 2025, at the age of 91.

== See also ==
- Catholic Church hierarchy
- Catholic Church in the United States
- Historical list of the Catholic bishops of the United States
- List of Catholic bishops of the United States
- Lists of patriarchs, archbishops, and bishops

Catholic Church titles
Preceded by John George Vlazny	Bishop of Winona; 1998–2009	Succeeded by John M. Quinn
Preceded by -	Auxiliary Bishop of Detroit; 1993–1998	Succeeded by -
Preceded by Raimundo de Castro e Silva	Titular Bishop of Uzalis; 1993–1998	Succeeded by Felix Genn
