= Bishop Noll Institute =

Location
- 1519 Hoffman Street; Hammond, Indiana 46327; United States; 41°37′38″N 87°29′33″W

Information
- Type: Private, Coeducational
- Motto: Preparing Students Mind, Body, and Soul
- Religious affiliation: Roman Catholic
- Established: 1921
- Authority: Diocese of Gary
- Superintendent: Colleen Brewer
- President: Paul Mullaney
- Principal: Lorenza Pastrick
- Chaplain: Fr. Jeff Burton
- Teaching staff: 41.1 (FTE)
- Grades: 9–12
- Enrollment: 613 (2023-24)
- Student to teacher ratio: 12.3
- Colors: Navy Blue and Gold
- Athletics: 13 Varsity Teams
- Athletics conference: Greater South Shore Conference
- Nickname: Warriors
- Rival: Andrean High School
- Newspaper: The JourNoll
- Yearbook: The Marquette
- Tuition: $9,200
- Website: www.bishopnoll.org

Bishop Noll Institute is a private, Roman Catholic high school in Hammond, Indiana. It is part of the Roman Catholic Diocese of Gary.

== History ==
The school opened as Catholic Central High School on September 16, 1921. It was founded by the Sisters of the Poor Handmaids of Jesus Christ. Father Lauer, who was pastor of the Saint Mary's Church in East Chicago at the time, allowed the sisters to use two classrooms as a temporary school until a proper building could be established.

In May 1922, the ground for a new school was broken on a purchased plot of land on White Oak Avenue between Hoffman Street and Chicago Avenue. However, the school's completion was delayed, and because Saint Mary's parochial grade school was accumulating higher enrollment numbers, five temporary structures were hurriedly constructed on the southwest corner of the school grounds. These served as the classrooms for the 1922-1923 senior class. Father P. J. Schmid was appointed as the school's director in 1922. The completed left wing of the building was dedicated later on September 9, 1923. An outdoor Mass, the first of its kind in the United States, was celebrated on a makeshift altar, bringing in 5,000 participants. The school was enlarged over the next ten years to include a convent, rectory, and gymnasium.

It was renamed Bishop Noll High School in 1947, in honor of John F. Noll of the Diocese of Fort Wayne.

In 1963, the building was dedicated by the bishop of the time, Andrew G. Grutka, who laid the cornerstone of the new Bishop Noll Institute.

== Athletics ==
The Bishop Noll Warriors compete in the Greater South Shore Conference. The school is a member of the Indiana High School Athletic Association (IHSAA), the organization which governs athletic activities in Indiana.

Bishop Noll has won the following Indiana state championships as of 2023-24:

- Baseball, 1968, 2003-04 (Class 2A)
- Football, 1989 (Class 3A)
- Boys Swimming, 1981 and 1984
- Boys Soccer, 2018 (Class 2A)
- Hockey, 1988 and 2017 (Class 1A), 2020 (Class 2A), 2023 (Class 3A)

Bishop Noll currently offers the following athletic programs:

Baseball
Basketball-Boys
Basketball-Girls
Bowling
Cheer Team
Cross Country
Dance Team
Football
Golf-Boys
Golf-Girls
Hockey
Soccer-Boys
Soccer-Girls
Softball
Swimming -Boys
Swimming-Girls
Tennis-Boys
Tennis-Girls
Track & Field-Boys and Girls
Volleyball
Wrestling

== Notable alumni ==
- Robert Joseph Buchanan - neurosurgeon, psychiatrist, and bioethicist
- Gonzalo P. Curiel - U.S. District Court judge
- Phil Ponce - Chicago television journalist
- Jerome Reppa - Former member of the Indiana House of Representatives from 1972 to 1990
- Frank Reynolds - television journalist, anchor of ABC's World News Tonight
- Joe Winkler - Former NFL center for the Cleveland Rams
- Marice Moylan Wolfe - Vanderbilt University archivist

== See also ==
- List of high schools in Indiana
