= Robert J. McClory =

American prelate of the Catholic Church (born 1963)

His Excellency, The Most Reverend Robert John McClory
- Bishop of Gary
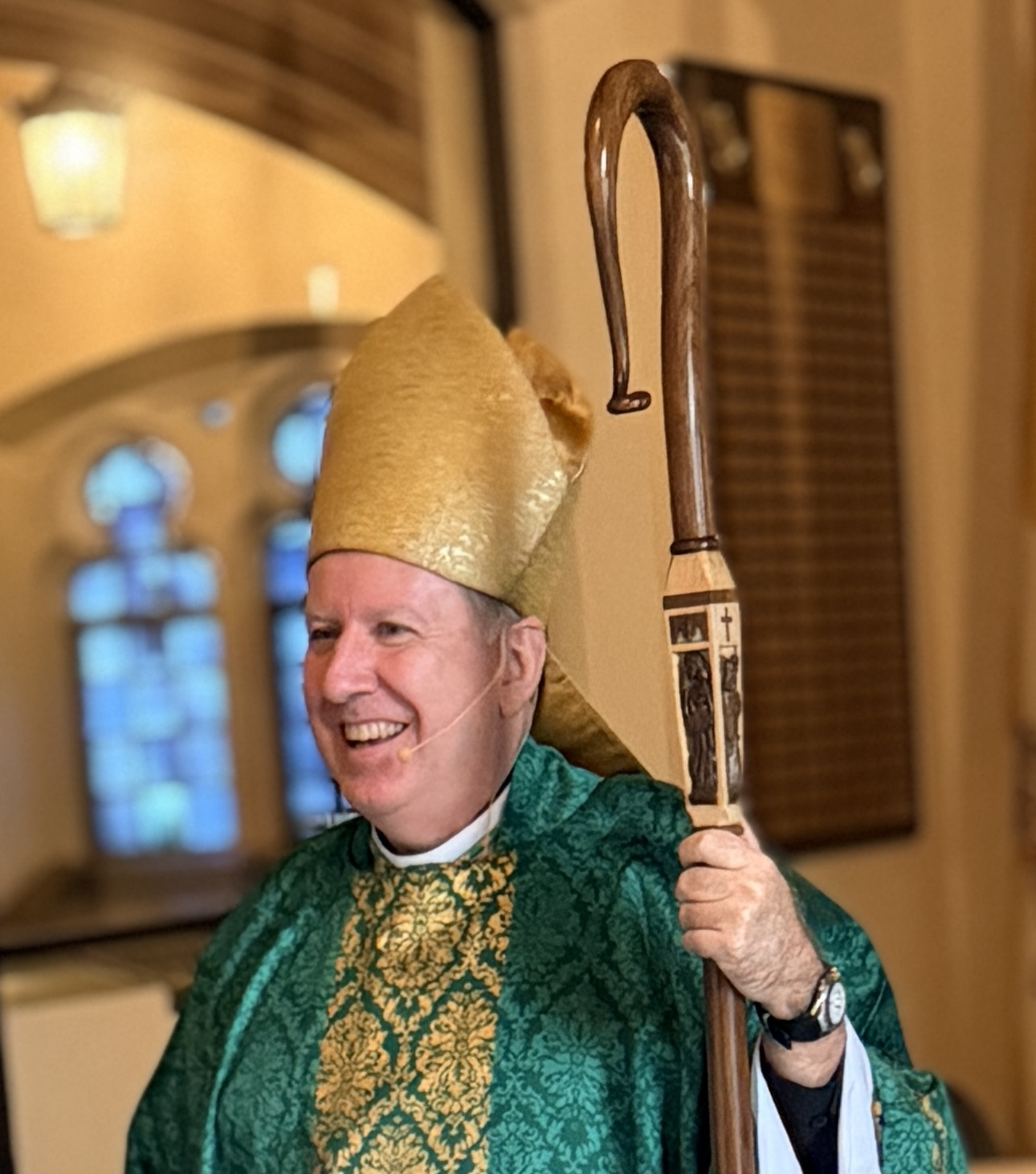
- Diocese: Gary
- Appointed: November 26, 2019
- Installed: February 11, 2020
- Predecessor: Donald J. Hying

Orders
- Ordination: May 22, 1999 by Adam Maida
- Consecration: February 11, 2020 by Charles C. Thompson, Allen Henry Vigneron, and Dale Joseph Melczek

Personal details
- Born: October 10, 1963 (age 63) Detroit, Michigan, US
- Education: BA Oakland University; MPA Columbia University; JD University of Michigan; STB Pontifical Gregorian University; JCL Pontifical University of St. Thomas Aquinas
- Motto: Iesum Dominum Praedicamus (We proclaim Jesus as Lord)
- Coat of arms

Styles of Robert John McClory
- Reference style: His Excellency; The Most Reverend
- Spoken style: Your Excellency
- Religious style: Bishop

Robert John McClory (born October 10, 1963) is an American prelate of the Catholic Church who has been serving as bishop of the Diocese of Gary in Indiana since 2019.

== Biography ==
=== Early life ===
Robert McClory was born in Detroit, Michigan, on October 10, 1963, the youngest of four children of James and Ann McClory. He graduated from George A. Dondero High School in Royal Oak.

In 1985, McClory earned a Bachelor of Arts in politics and communications from Oakland University. In 1987, he received a master's degree in public policy and administration from Columbia University in New York City and in 1991 a Juris Doctor from the University of Michigan Law School in Ann Arbor, Michigan.

After practicing civil law for three years, McClory decided to become a priest. He entered Sacred Heart Major Seminary in Detroit in 1994, where he studied philosophy for one year. McClory traveled to Rome in 1995 to be a seminarian at the Pontifical North American College. He obtained a Bachelor of Sacred Theology degree in 1998 from the Pontifical Gregorian University in Rome. McClory was ordained to the diaconate by Archbishop Edmund Szoka in St. Peter's Basilica in Rome on October 8, 1998. He received a Licentiate of Canon Law in 2000 from the Pontifical University of St. Thomas Aquinas in Rome.

=== Priesthood ===
After returning to Michigan, McClory was ordained a priest for the Archdiocese of Detroit at the Cathedral of the Most Blessed Sacrament in Detroit by Cardinal Adam Maida on May 22, 1999.

After his 1999 ordination, the diocese assigned McClory in 2000 as associate pastor of St. Therese of Lisieux Parish in Shelby Township, Michigan and at St. Isidore Parish in Macomb Township, Michigan. In 2001, he was also appointed as a judge on the metropolitan tribunal. Maida took McClory away from his parish assignments in 2002 to appoint him as his administrative secretary as well as an instructor in canon law at Sacred Heart Major Seminary.

Maida appointed McClory as chancellor of the archdiocese in 2003. For the next eight years, he also served as a weekend pastor at St. Blase Parish in Sterling Heights, Michigan. On May 20, 2005, Pope Benedict XVI appointed McClory as Chaplain of His Holiness, granting him the title of Monsignor. Archbishop Allen Henry Vigneron named Msgr. McClory in 2009 as moderator of the curia and vicar general. He served as chief of staff for Vigneron, coordinating the central offices of the archdiocese.

McClory left St. Blase in 2011 to become pastor of Presentation of Our Lady of Victory Parish in Detroit while keeping his positions with the archdiocese. He was transferred from Our Lady in 2017 to serve as pastor and rector of the National Shrine of the Little Flower Basilica in Royal Oak. While in Detroit, McClory served on the following boards:

- Catholic Charities of Southeast Michigan
- Sacred Heart Major Seminary
- St. Catherine of Siena Academy in Wixom, Michigan
- Loyola High School in Detroit

=== Bishop of Gary ===
Pope Francis appointed Msgr. McClory as the fifth bishop of Gary on November 26, 2019. On February 11, 2020, McClory was consecrated by Archbishop Charles C. Thompson at Holy Angels Cathedral in Gary, with Vigneron and Bishop Dale Joseph Melczek serving as co-consecrators.

Bishop McClory is a fourth degree member of the Knights of Columbus and is a member of the Order of the Holy Sepulchre.

== See also ==
- Catholic Church hierarchy
- Catholic Church in the United States
- Historical list of the Catholic bishops of the United States
- List of Catholic bishops of the United States
- Lists of patriarchs, archbishops, and bishops

== Episcopal succession ==
Catholic Church titles
Preceded by Donald J. Hying	Bishop of Gary; 2020-Present	Succeeded by Incumbent
