= John M. Quinn =

American prelate of the Catholic Church (born 1945)

His Excellency, The Most Reverend John Michael Quinn
- Bishop emeritus of Winona–Rochester
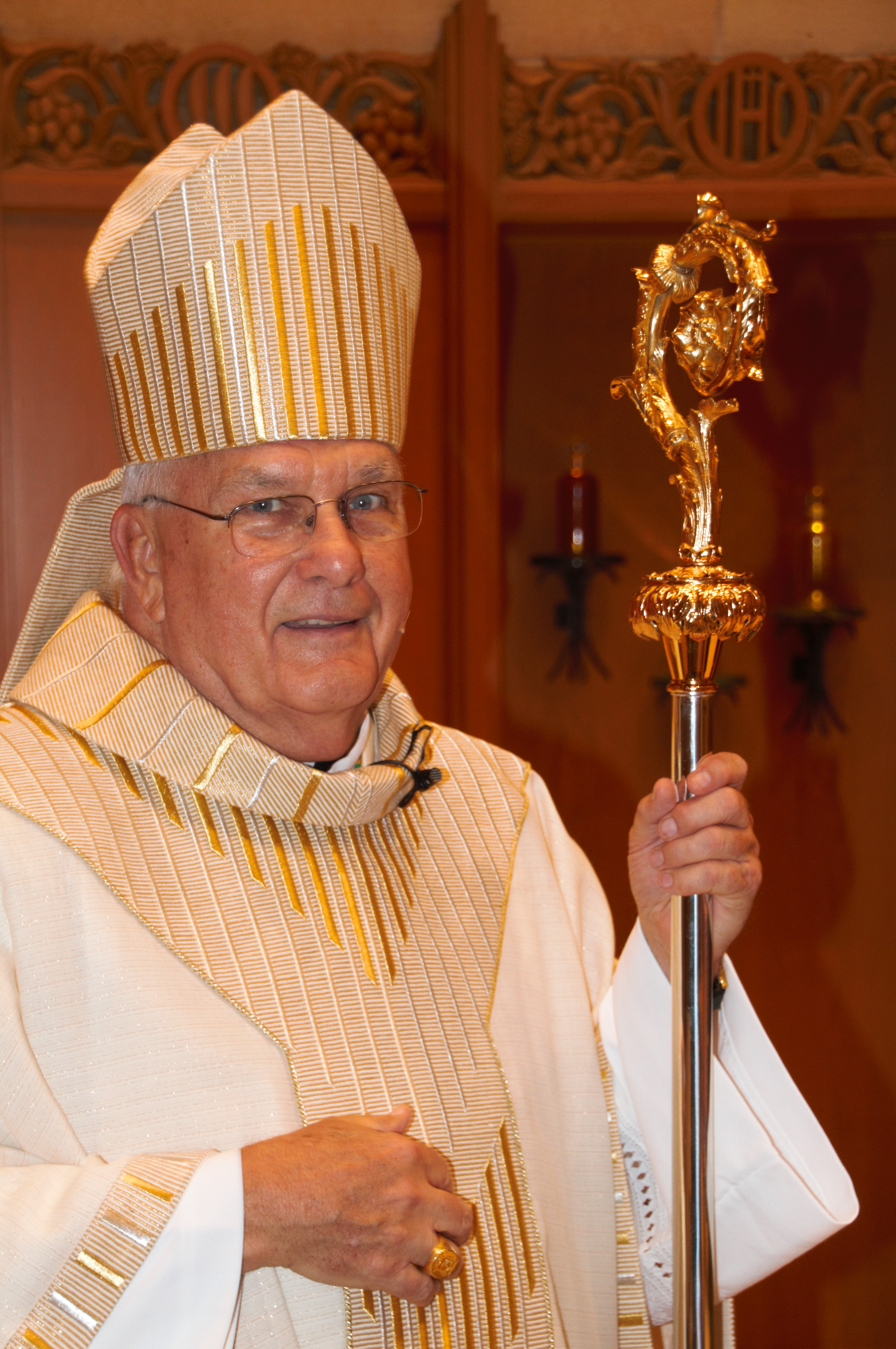
- Church: Catholic Church; Latin Church
- Diocese: Winona–Rochester
- Appointed: October 15, 2008
- Installed: May 7, 2009
- Retired: June 2, 2022
- Predecessor: Bernard Harrington
- Successor: Robert Barron
- Previous posts: Bishop of Winona–Rochester (2009‍–‍2022); Coadjutor Bishop of Winona (2008‍–‍2009); Auxiliary Bishop of Archdiocese of Detroit (2003‍–‍2008); Titular Bishop of Ressiana (2003‍–‍2008)

Orders
- Ordination: March 17, 1972 by Walter Joseph Schoenherr
- Consecration: August 12, 2003 by Adam Maida, Edmund Szoka, Walter Joseph Schoenherr

Personal details
- Born: December 17, 1945 (age 80) Detroit, Michigan, U.S.
- Motto: Rejoice in hope

John Michael Quinn (born December 17, 1945) was named as the eighth bishop of the former Diocese of Winona in Minnesota in 2008. From 2018 until his retirement in 2022, Quinn served as bishop of the Diocese of Winona–Rochester. Quinn previously served as an auxiliary bishop of the Archdiocese of Detroit in Michigan from 2003 to 2008.

== Biography ==
=== Early life ===
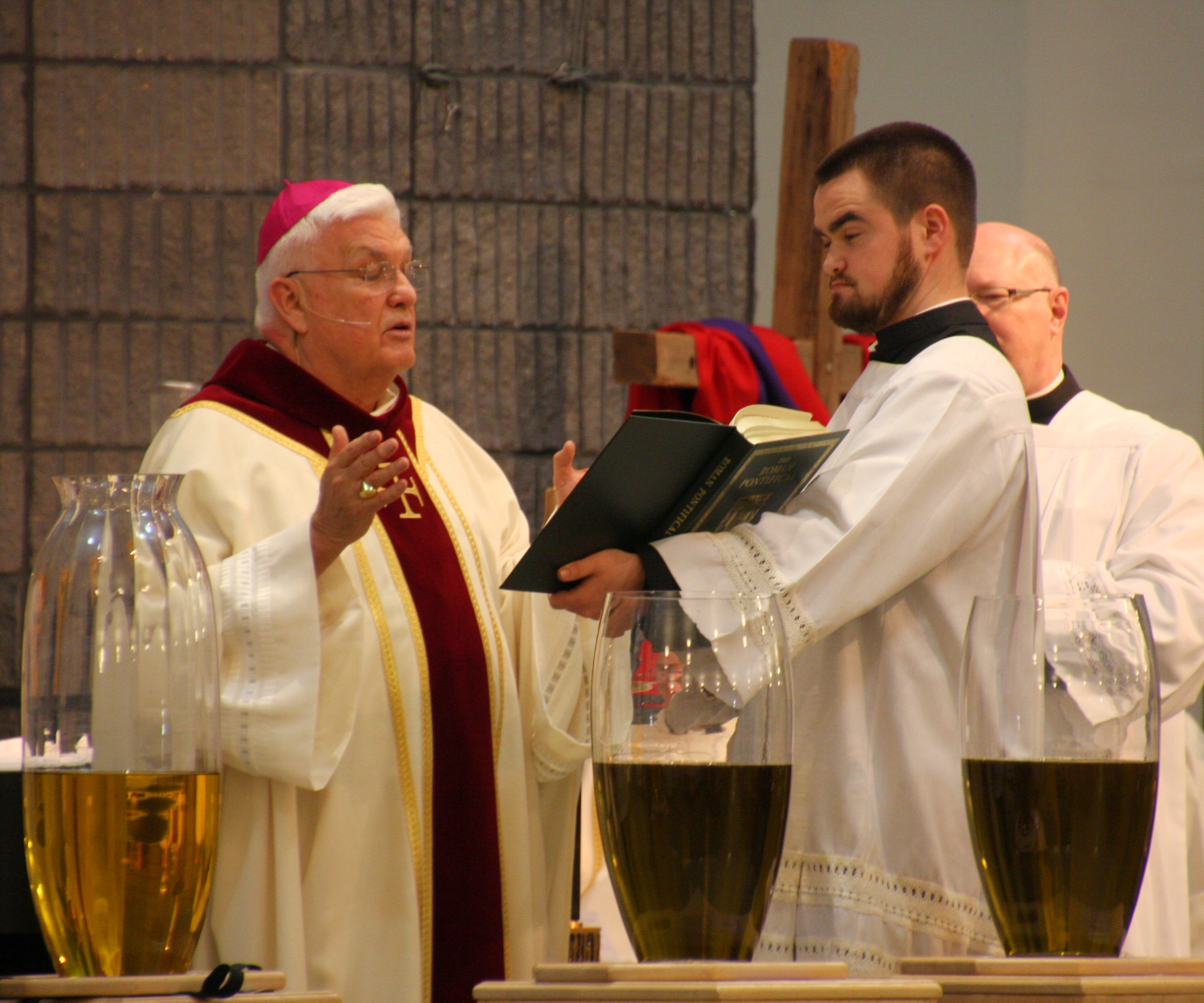
Bishop Quinn blessing oils in 2017

The youngest of three children, John Quinn was born on December 17, 1945, in Detroit, Michigan to George and Mary Quinn. He attended St. Anthony High School and then Sacred Heart Major Seminary in Detroit, obtaining his Bachelor of Philosophy degree.

Quinn also earned a Master of Divinity degree from St. John's Provincial Seminary in Plymouth, Michigan. He received Master of Religious Studies and Master of Systematic Theology degrees from the University of Detroit Mercy.

=== Priesthood ===
Quinn was ordained to the priesthood for the Archdiocese of Detroit at St. Raymond's Church in Detroit by Bishop Walter Schoenherr on March 17, 1972. He completed his graduate studies at the Catholic University of America in Washington, D.C. Quinn served as an associate pastor in parishes in Farmington, Michigan and Harper Woods, Michigan, before becoming pastor of St. Luke's Parish in Detroit.

In 1990, the Vatican raised Quinn to the rank of honorary prelate. He served as the archdiocesan director for justice and peace and for education (1990–2003), and as Cardinal Adam Maida's delegate to Sacred Heart Seminary (where Quinn was an adjunct member of the faculty).

=== Auxiliary Bishop of Detroit ===
On July 7, 2003, Quinn was appointed by Pope John Paul II as an auxiliary bishop of Detroit and titular bishop of Ressiana. He received his episcopal ordination at the Cathedral of the Most Blessed Sacrament in Detroit on August 12, 2003, from Maida, with Cardinal Edmund Szoka and Bishop Walter Schoenherr serving as co-consecrators. Quinn selected as his episcopal motto: "Rejoice in Hope" (Romans 12:12).

=== Bishop of Winona and Winona–Rochester ===
Pope Benedict XVI named Quinn as coadjutor bishop of Winona on October 15, 2008, being formally installed on December 11, 2008. After the retirement of Bishop Bernard Harrington, Quinn automatically became the new bishop of Winona on May 7, 2009.

On March 27, 2018, the Vatican renamed the Diocese of Winona as the Diocese of Winona–Rochester, with Quinn remaining as bishop. On June 2, 2022, Pope Francis accepted Quinn's resignation as bishop of Winona–Rochester and appointed Auxiliary Bishop Robert Barron as his successor.

Styles of John Michael Quinn
- Reference style: His Excellency; The Most Reverend
- Spoken style: Your Excellency
- Religious style: Bishop

== See also ==
- Catholic Church in the United States
- Hierarchy of the Catholic Church
- Historical list of the Catholic bishops of the United States
- List of Catholic bishops in the United States
- Lists of popes, patriarchs, primates, archbishops, and bishops

Catholic Church titles
New title Diocese Name Changed	Bishop of Winona–Rochester; 2018–2022	Succeeded by Robert Barron
Preceded by Bernard Harrington	Bishop of Winona; 2008–2018	Diocese Name Changed
Preceded by -	Auxiliary Bishop of Detroit; 2003–2008	Succeeded by -
