= Norbert Felix Gaughan =

American prelate

His Excellency, The Most Reverend Norbert Felix Gaughan D.D.
- Bishop of Gary
- See: Roman Catholic Diocese of Gary
- In office: October 2, 1984 - June 1, 1996
- Predecessor: Andrew Gregory Grutka
- Successor: Dale Joseph Melczek
- Previous posts: Titular Bishop of Taraqua and auxiliary bishop of Greensburg (1975 - 1984)

Orders
- Ordination: November 4, 1945 by Hugh Charles Boyle
- Consecration: June 26, 1975 by William G. Connare

Personal details
- Born: May 30, 1921 Pittsburgh, Pennsylvania, US
- Died: October 1, 1999 (age 78) Crown Point, Indiana, US
- Buried: Saint Emma Monastery Greensburg, Pennsylvania, US
- Denomination: Catholic Church
- Motto: Grant a heart that listens

Styles of Norbert Felix Gaughan
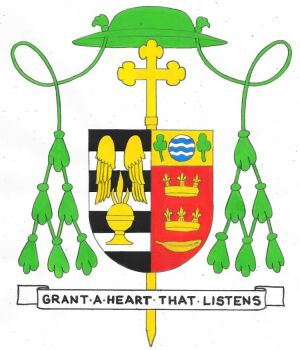
- Reference style: The Most Reverend
- Spoken style: Your Excellency
- Religious style: Bishop
- Posthumous style: not applicable

Norbert Felix Gaughan (May 30, 1921 – October 1, 1999) was an American prelate of the Catholic Church. He served as an auxiliary bishop of the Diocese of Greensburg in Pennsylvania from 1975 to 1984 and as bishop of the Diocese of Gary in Indiana from 1984 to 1996.

== Biography ==
Gaughan was born on May 30, 1921, in Pittsburgh, Pennsylvania. He was ordained a priest on November 4, 1945, for the Diocese of Greensburg.

=== Auxiliary Bishop of Greensburg ===
On April 2, 1975, Gaughan was named titular bishop of Taraqua and auxiliary bishop of Greensburg by Pope Paul VI. He was consecrated at Blessed Sacrament Cathedral in Greensburg, Pennsylvania, by Bishop William G. Connare; Bishop Cyril Vogel and Auxiliary Bishop John McDowell were the principal co-consecrators.

=== Bishop of Gary ===
On July 24, 1984, Pope St. John Paul II named Gaughan as the second bishop of Gary. In February 1992, Gaughan suffered a debilitating stroke. Because of his health situation, Pope John Paul II appointed Bishop Dale Melczek on August 19, 1992, as apostolic administrator sede plena of the diocese. On October 28, 1995, John Paul II named Melczek as coadjutor bishop of Gary to assist Gaughan.

=== Retirement and legacy ===
On June 1, 1996. Pope St. John Paul II accepted Gaughan's resignation as bishop of Gary. Gaughan spent his final years at Saint Anthony Home in Crown Point, Indiana. Norbert Gaughan died on October 1, 1999, in Crown Point. He was buried in the Saint Emma Monastery cemetery in Greensburg, Pennsylvania, after a funeral mass in Gary.

Catholic Church titles
Preceded by Andrew Gregory Grutka	Bishop of Gary; 1984–1996	Succeeded by Dale Joseph Melczek
