= Robert Buchanan =

Robert, Rob, Robbie, or Bob Buchanan may refer to:

== Sports ==
- Robert Buchanan (footballer, born 1867) (1867–1909), Scottish footballer
- Robert Buchanan (footballer, born 1887) (1887–?), Scottish footballer
- Bob Buchanan (baseball) (born 1961), American baseball player
- Robbie Buchanan (born 1996), Scottish footballer
- Bob Buchanan (curler), American curler

== Others ==
- Robert Buchanan (playwright) (1785–1873), Scottish minister and professor of logic and rhetoric at the University of Glasgow
- Robert Buchanan (minister) (1802–1875), Moderator of the General Assembly of the Free Church of Scotland 1860/61
- Robert C. Buchanan (1811–1878), American military officer
- Robert Buchanan (Owenite) (1813–1866), Scottish socialist writer, lecturer and journalist
- Robert Williams Buchanan (1841–1901), Scottish writer, son of Robert Buchanan the Owenite
- Robert Earle Buchanan (1883–1973), American bacteriologist
- Robert D. Buchanan (born 1931), American creator of several animated TV shows
- Robert Buchanan (actor) (born 1962), Scottish actor
- Robert Joseph Buchanan, American neurosurgeon, psychiatrist, and bioethicist
