= Donald J. Hying =

American Roman Catholic prelate (born 1963)

The Most Reverend Donald Joseph Hying
- Bishop of Madison
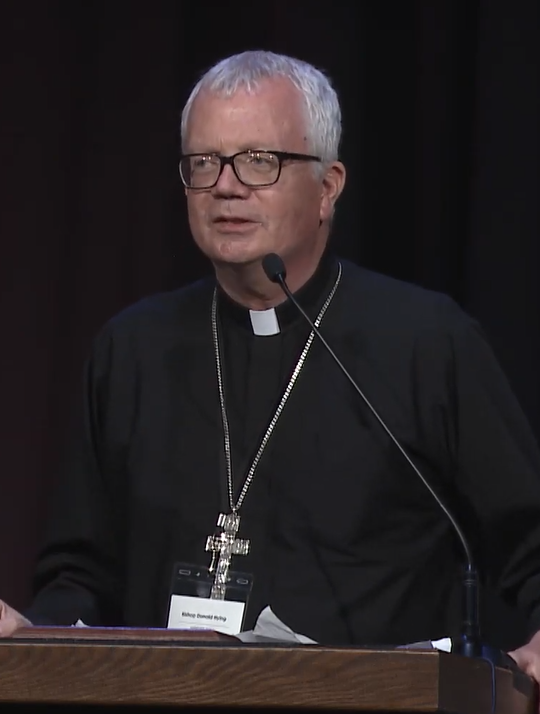
- Bishop Hying in 2022
- Diocese: Diocese of Madison
- Appointed: April 25, 2019
- Installed: June 25, 2019
- Predecessor: Robert C. Morlino
- Previous posts: Auxiliary Bishop of Milwaukee and Titular Bishop of Regiae (2011-2015); Bishop of Gary (2015-2019)

Orders
- Ordination: May 20, 1989 by Rembert Weakland
- Consecration: July 20, 2011 by Jerome Edward Listecki, Richard J. Sklba, and Timothy M. Dolan

Personal details
- Born: August 18, 1963 (age 63) West Allis, Wisconsin, US
- Denomination: Catholic Church
- Parents: Albert and Catherine Hying
- Education: Marquette University; St. Francis Seminary
- Motto: Caritas numquam excidit (Love never fails)

Styles of Donald Joseph Hying
- Reference style: His Excellency; The Most Reverend
- Spoken style: Your Excellency
- Religious style: Bishop

Donald Joseph Hying (born August 18, 1963) is an American prelate of the Roman Catholic Church, serving as the bishop of the Diocese of Madison in Wisconsin since 2019. Hying previously served as bishop of the Diocese of Gary in Indiana from 2015 to 2019 and as an auxiliary bishop of the Archdiocese of Milwaukee in Wisconsin from 2011 to 2015.

== Biography ==
=== Early life ===
The youngest of six sons, Donald J. Hying was born on August 18, 1963, in West Allis, Wisconsin, to Albert and Catherine Hying. He attended St. Aloysius and Immaculate Heart of Mary grade schools, and graduated from Brookfield Central High School in Brookfield, Wisconsin. Hying received his bachelor's degree from Marquette University and his Master of Divinity degree from Saint Francis de Sales Seminary in St. Francis, Wisconsin.

=== Priesthood ===
On May 20, 1989, Hying was ordained a priest for the Archdiocese of Milwaukee at the Cathedral of St. John the Evangelist in Milwaukee by Archbishop Rembert Weakland. After his ordination, the archdiocese assigned Hying as associate pastor of St. Anthony Parish in Menomonee Falls, Wisconsin, where he served for the next five years.

In 1994, Hying traveled to the Dominican Republic to serve as a missionary at the Sacred Family Parish in Sabana Yegua. After returning to Wisconsin in 1998, the archdiocese appointed him as temporary administrator of St. Peter Parish in East Troy, Wisconsin. Later that year, he was moved to St. Anthony Parish in Milwaukee, where he worked as associate pastor for one year.

Hying was appointed pastor in 1999 of Our Lady of Good Hope Parish in Milwaukee, remaining there until 2005. He then became the dean of formation at Saint Francis de Sales Seminary from 2005 until 2007, when was named rector. In 2006, while serving at the seminary, Hying was placed as a temporary administrator at St. Augustine Parish in Milwaukee.

=== Auxiliary Bishop of Milwaukee ===
On May 26, 2011, Pope Benedict XVI appointed Hying as titular bishop of Regiae and auxiliary bishop of the Archdiocese of Milwaukee. He was consecrated by Archbishop Jerome Edward Listecki at the Cathedral of St. John the Evangelist on July 20, 2011, with Auxiliary Bishop Richard J. Sklba and Archbishop Timothy M. Dolan serving as co-consecrators.

=== Bishop of Gary ===
Coat of arms when Hying was bishop of Gary

On November 24, 2014, Pope Francis appointed Hying as the fourth bishop of Gary, replacing the retiring Bishop Dale Joseph Melczek. Hying's installation in Gary took place on January 6, 2015. While he was bishop of Gary, Hying oversaw that diocese's first synod in 2017.

=== Bishop of Madison ===
On April 25, 2019, Pope Francis named Hying as bishop of Madison to replace the late Bishop Robert Morlino. Hying was installed on June 25, 2019.

In March 2020, Hying announced that investigators had found two sexual abuse allegations against Reverend Patrick Doherty, a retired diocesan priest, to be credible. Hying had already placed restrictions on Doherty.

In June 2020, Hying criticized the destruction by protesters of religious statues during protests after the murder of George Floyd by a policeman. He also stated that some statues might merit removal and storage. Hying also condemned civil rights activist Shaun King for calling for the destruction images of Jesus as a white man.

== See also ==
- Catholic Church by country
- Catholic Church hierarchy
- Catholic Church in the United States
- Historical list of the Catholic bishops of the United States
- List of Catholic bishops of the United States
- List of the Catholic dioceses of the United States
- Lists of patriarchs, archbishops, and bishops

Catholic Church titles
Preceded by Robert C. Morlino	Bishop of Madison; 2019–present	Succeeded by Incumbent
Preceded by Dale Joseph Melczek	Bishop of Gary; 2015–2019	Succeeded by Robert John McClory
Preceded by –	Auxiliary Bishop of Milwaukee; 2011–2015	Succeeded by –
