= Arthur Henry Krawczak =

American Bishop

His Excellency, The Most Reverend Arthur H. Krawczak
- Auxiliary Bishop of Detroit
- Church: Catholic Church
- See: Titular See of Subbar
- Appointed: February 8, 1973
- In office: April 3, 1973 - August 17, 1982

Orders
- Ordination: May 18, 1940 by Edward Aloysius Mooney
- Consecration: April 3, 1973 by John Francis Dearden

Personal details
- Born: February 2, 1913 Detroit, Michigan, US
- Died: January 13, 2000 (aged 86) Livonia, Michigan, US
- Motto: Serve with gladness

Arthur Henry Krawczak (February 2, 1913 – January 13, 2000) was an American prelate of the Catholic Church in the United States. He served as an auxiliary bishop of the Archdiocese of Detroit in Michigan from 1973 to 1982.

== Biography ==
=== Early life ===
Arthur Krawczak was born in Detroit, Michigan, on February 2, 1913. He was ordained a priest by Cardinal Edward Aloysius Mooney at the Cathedral of the Most Blessed Sacrament in Detroit for the Archdiocese of Detroit on May 18, 1940.

=== Auxiliary Bishop of Detroit ===
On February 8, 1973, Pope Paul VI appointed Krawczak as titular Bishop of Subbar and an auxiliary bishop for Detroit. He was consecrated by Cardinal John Dearden on April 3, 1973, at the Cathedral of the Most Sacred Sacrament. The principal co-consecrators were Detroit auxiliary bishops Walter Schoenherr and Thomas Gumbleton.

Krawczak continued to serve as an auxiliary bishop until his resignation was accepted by Pope John Paul II on August 17, 1982. He died in Livonia, Michigan, on January 13, 2000, at the age of 86.
