= Dale Joseph Melczek =

American Catholic bishop (1938–2022)

His Excellency, The Most Reverend Dale Joseph Melczek
- Bishop of Gary
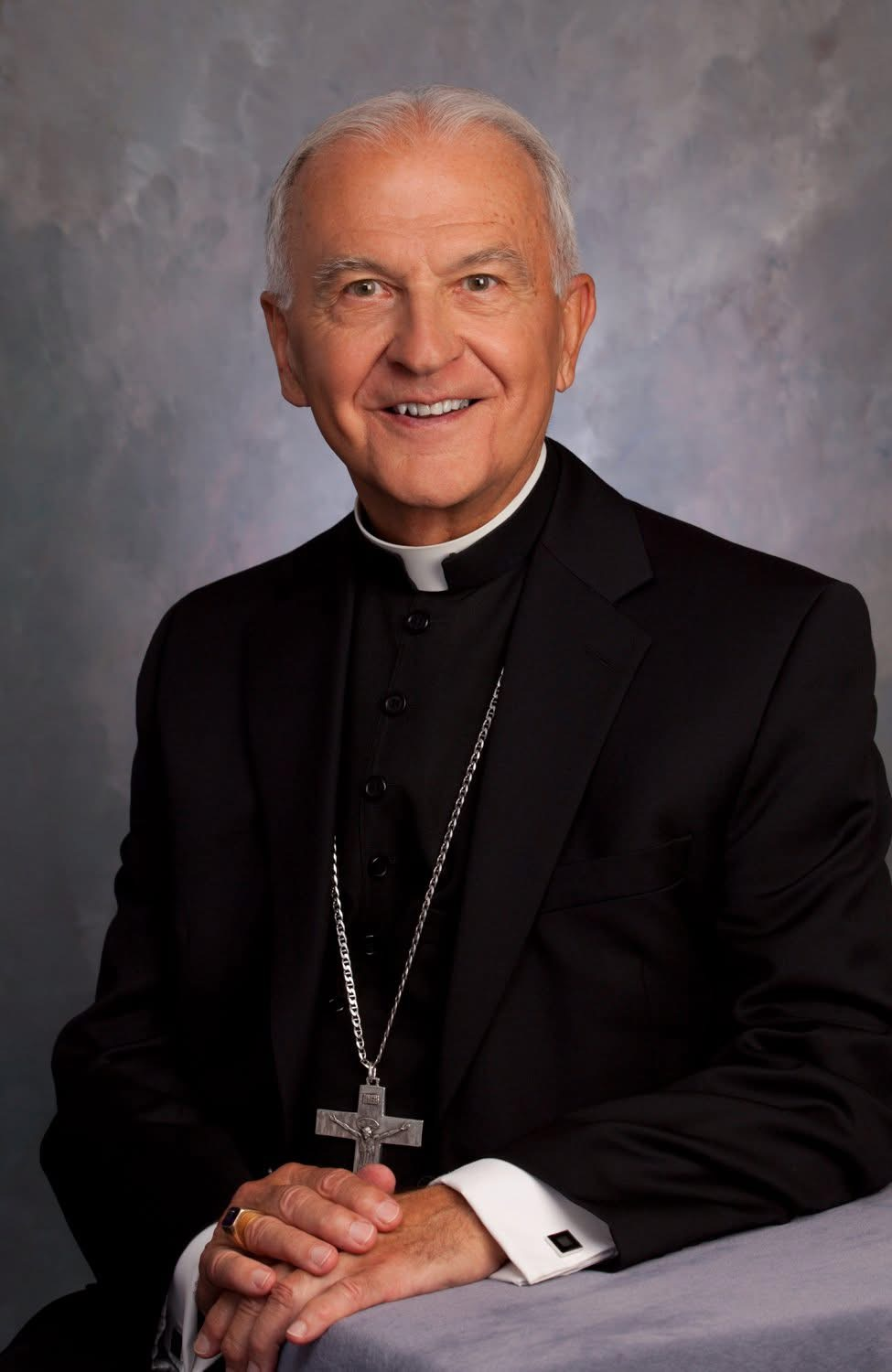
- Diocese: Gary
- Appointed: October 28, 1995 (Coadjutor)
- Installed: June 1, 1996
- Term ended: November 24, 2014
- Predecessor: Norbert Felix Gaughan
- Successor: Donald J. Hying
- Previous posts: Coadjutor Bishop of Gary (1995–1996); Apostolic Administrator of Gary (1992–1995); Auxiliary Bishop of Detroit and Titular Bishop of Tragurium (1983–1992)

Orders
- Ordination: June 6, 1964 by John Francis Dearden
- Consecration: January 27, 1983 by Edmund Szoka, Harold Robert Perry, and Arthur Henry Krawczak

Personal details
- Born: November 9, 1938 Detroit, Michigan, U.S.
- Died: August 25, 2022 (aged 83) Crown Point, Indiana
- Buried: Cathedral of the Holy Angels Parish
- Denomination: Catholic Church
- Education: St. Mary's College (undergraduate); St. John's Provincial Seminary (post graduate); University of Detroit (masters); University of Notre Dame (doctorate work)
- Motto: To Know Christ

Styles of Dale Joseph Melczek
- Reference style: His Excellency; The Most Reverend
- Spoken style: Your Excellency
- Religious style: Bishop

Dale Joseph Melczek (November 9, 1938 – August 25, 2022) was an American prelate of the Roman Catholic Church. He served as an auxiliary bishop of the Archdiocese of Detroit in Michigan from 1982 to 1992 and as bishop of the Diocese of Gary in Indiana from 1996 until 2014.

== Biography ==
=== Early years ===
Dale Melczek was born on November 9, 1938, in Detroit, Michigan. He first studied at St. Mary's College in Orchard Lake Village, Michigan. He then attended St. John's Provincial Seminary in Plymouth, Michigan, where he received a Master of Divinity degree. Melczek earned a Master of Education degree from the University of Detroit, and did his postgraduate work at the University of Notre Dame in Indiana

=== Priesthood ===
Melczek was ordained to the priesthood for the Archdiocese of Detroit by Archbishop John Dearden on June 6, 1964. After his ordination, the archdiocese assigned Melczek as associate pastor at St. Sylvester Parish in Warren, Michigan, serving there for the next six years. In 1970, he was named as co-pastor of St. Christine Parish in Detroit, becoming pastor in 1972. He also started serving as vicar of the West Detroit Vicariate in 1973. Melczek was named assistant vicar for parishes in 1975. Two years later, Cardinal John Dearden named Melczek as his private secretary and vicar general.

=== Auxiliary bishop of Detroit ===
On December 3, 1982, Pope John Paul II appointed Melczek as an auxiliary bishop of Detroit and titular bishop of Tragurium. He received his episcopal consecration at the Cathedral of the Most Blessed Sacrament in Detroit on January 27, 1983, from Archbishop Edmund Szoka, with Bishops Harold Perry and Arthur Krawczak serving as co-consecrators.

As an auxiliary bishop, Melczek served as episcopal vicar of the Detroit Northwest Region. In 1987, he coordinated John Paul II's papal visit to Detroit.

=== Bishop of Gary ===
On August 19, 1992. Melczek was named apostolic administrator of Gary. John Paul II on October 28, 1995, appointed Melczek as coadjutor bishop of Gary to assist Bishop Norbert Gaughan. When Gaughan retired, Melczek automatically become the third bishop of Gary on June 1, 1996.

In November 1996, Melczek was elected to the national board of Catholic Relief Services. In 1997, Melczek visited the Philippines and in 1998 Myanmar and Cambodia. In the summer of 1999, he went to Indonesia and East Timor. Melczek visited the Democratic Republic of Congo and the Republic of the Congo in 2001, then Angola and Tanzania in 2003.

Melczek also served as chair of the United States Conference of Catholic Bishops (USCCB) Committee on the Laity (2002–2005), co-chairman of the Race Relations Council of Northwest Indiana (2002–2007), and episcopal liaison to the National Association of Catholic Chaplains (2002–2007).

In 2003, Melczek petitioned Cardinal Joseph Ratzinger in Rome to remove Reverend Richard Emerson from the priesthood. Multiple allegations of inappropriate behavior had been generated from Emerson's assignments in Gary and the Diocese of Orlando. Also in 2003, Melczek removed Monsignor Don Grass from ministry after he admitted sexually abusing a minor. It happened while Grass was assigned to Cathedral of the Holy Angels Parish in Gary during the late 1960s.

In 2005, Melczek and the Diocese of Gary were named in a lawsuit by an Orlando man. The plaintiff stated that Emerson had sexually abused him as a minor during the late 1980s and early 1990s when Emerson was posted at St. Charles Borromeo Parish in Orlando. The lawsuit claimed that the diocese and Melczek ignored earlier sexual abuse allegations against Emerson during his first stay in Indiana. At his request, Emerson was removed from the priesthood in 2006. On July 7, 2010, Melczek and the diocese of Gary were sued again, based on allegations by a different man in Orlando against Emerson.

=== Retirement ===
On November 9, 2013, Melczek turned 75, the age at which bishops must submit their resignations to the pope. On November 24, 2014, Pope Francis accepted Melczek's resignation, replacing him with Auxiliary Bishop Donald J. Hying. Melczek served as apostolic administrator of the diocese until Hying's installation in January 2015. He also served as administrator of St. Mary of the Lake Parish in Gary.

On August 24, 2022, Melczek suffered a stroke. He died in Crown Point, Indiana, on August 25, 2022.

== See also ==
- Catholic Church hierarchy
- Catholic Church in the United States
- Historical list of the Catholic bishops of the United States
- List of Catholic bishops of the United States
- Lists of patriarchs, archbishops, and bishops

Catholic Church titles
Preceded by Norbert Felix Gaughan	Bishop of Gary; 1996–2014	Succeeded by Donald J. Hying
Preceded by —	Auxiliary Bishop of Detroit; 1983–1992	Succeeded by —
Preceded by Thaddeus Anthony Shubsda	Titular Bishop of Tragurium; 1983–1992	Succeeded by Pierre Farine
