= Jerome Reppa =

American lawyer and politician

Member of the Indiana House of Representatives from the 15th district
- In office November 3, 1982 – November 7, 1990
- Preceded by: Multi-member district
- Succeeded by: Multi-member district

Member of the Indiana House of Representatives from the 4th district
- In office November 8, 1972 – November 3, 1982
- Preceded by: Multi-member district
- Succeeded by: Multi-member district

Personal details
- Party: Republican

Jerome James "Jerry" Reppa (April 14, 1925 – October 1, 2014) was an American lawyer and politician.

Born in East Chicago, Indiana, he graduated from Catholic Central High School (Bishop Noll Institute) in 1943. Reppa then served in the United States Army during World War II. He then went to Butler University and received his law degree from the University of Miami School of Law. He was a member of the Florida and Indiana bars. He served in the Indiana House of Representatives from 1972 to 1990 and was a member of the Republican Party. He died in Munster, Indiana.

He was a Roman Catholic.
