= Marquette Catholic High School (Indiana) =

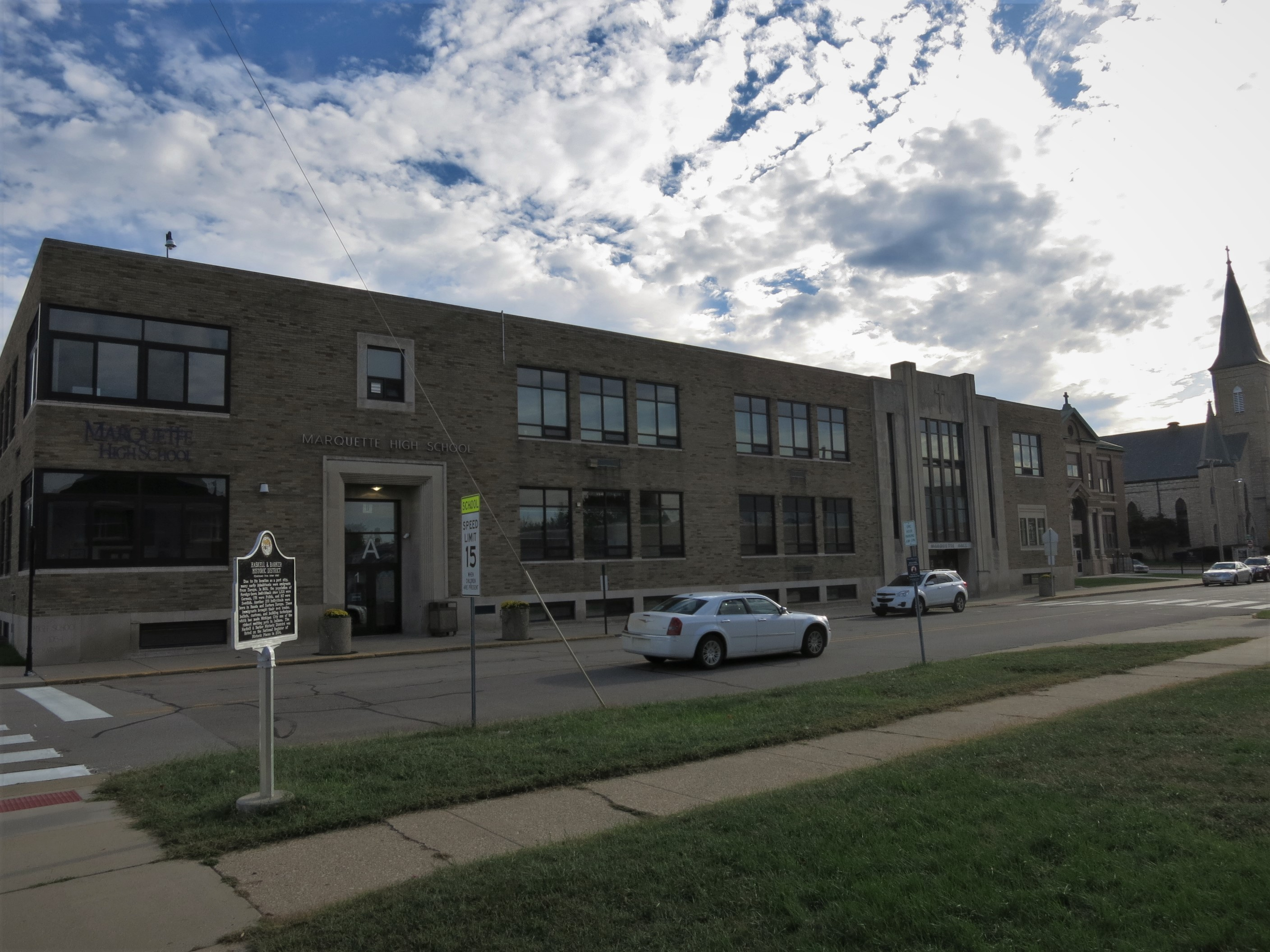

Location
- 306 W Tenth Street; Michigan City, Indiana 46360; United States; 41°42′40″N 86°54′8″W

Information
- Type: Private, Coeducational
- Religious affiliation: Roman Catholic
- Established: 1886
- Oversight: Diocese of Gary
- Principal: Katie Collignon
- Grades: 9–12
- Color
- Nickname: Blazers
- Website: www.marquette-hs.org

Marquette Catholic High School is a private, co-educational, college prep school in Michigan City, Indiana. It is run along the principles of the Roman Catholic Diocese of Gary. Marquette offers dual credit courses, and AP credit opportunities (typically through Ivy Tech Community College).

== IHSAA State Championships ==
Marquette has won 12 state titles: nine in volleyball, one in boys basketball, and two in girls basketball:

- Volleyball (1999, 2000, 2001, 2004, 2005, 2006, 2007, 2008, 2009)
- Boys Basketball (2014)
- Girls Basketball (2018, 2019)
