= Marice Moylan Wolfe =

American university archivist (1935–2022)

- Marice Moylan (later Wolfe), from the 1952 yearbook of Bishop Noll High School
- Born: Mary Alice Moylan; August 3, 1935; Warren, Ohio
- Died: January 3, 2022 (age 86); Nashville, Tennessee
- Occupation: College archivist

Mary Alice "Marice" Moylan Wolfe (August 3, 1935 – January 3, 2022) was an American archivist. She was University Archivist and Head of Special Collections at Vanderbilt University for over 25 years, beginning in 1973.

== Early life and education ==
Mary Alice Moylan was born in Warren, Ohio, and raised in Hammond, Indiana, one of the four daughters of Francis James Moylan and Harriette Brazzelle Moylan. She graduated from Bishop Noll High School in Hammond. She earned a bachelor's degree from Clarke University in Iowa in 1956, where she won writing awards, edited the college newspaper and literary magazine, and was active in the National Federation of Catholic College Students. She earned a master's degree from Marquette University in 1958, and a second master's degree, in library science, from George Peabody College in 1974.

== Career ==
Wolfe taught English at several colleges as a young woman. She became Head of Special Collections at Vanderbilt University in 1973. She became University Archivist as well, in 1975, the first woman to hold that title at Vanderbilt. The archive's holdings are strong in Southern literary papers and records of the civil rights movement, and also include the Francis Robinson Collection of Theatre, Music, and Dance. She was a regular speaker at Nashville literary events, including the Southern Festival of Books. She retired from Vanderbilt in 2000.

Wolfe was elected president of Tennessee Archivists in 1979. She also reviewed books for the Daily News-Journal newspaper. After she retired, she consulted with the Nashville Public Library and other community organizations.

== Personal life ==
Moylan married English professor William Robert Wolfe in 1959. They divorced in 1975. She died in 2022, at the age of 86, at her home in Nashville.
