= Robert Joseph Buchanan =

American neurosurgeon, psychiatrist, and neuroethicist

Robert Joseph Buchanan KM+
- Born: Chicago, Illinois, United States
- Education: University Of Chicago; Saint Louis University School of Medicine; Yale University School of Medicine; University of California, San Diego
- Occupation: Physician
- Medical career
- Profession: Neurosurgeon and Psychiatrist
- Field: Neurosurgery and Psychiatry
- Institutions: Salk Institute for Biological Studies; Pontifical Academy for Life; Dell Medical School
- Research: Neuroscience
- Scientific career
- Doctoral advisors: Francis Crick, Larry Squire, and Fred Gage
- Website: https://robertjbuchananmd.com/

Robert Joseph Buchanan KM+ is an American neurosurgeon, psychiatrist, and bioethicist who is best known for his contributions to the field of neuroscience, psychosurgery, and neuroethics. He is an associate professor of neurosurgery at Dell Medical School, University of Texas at Austin and maintains courtesy associate professor appointments in the school's department of neurology and department of psychiatry and behavioral sciences.

== Early life and education ==
Buchanan grew up on the south side of Chicago. He attended the Bishop Noll Institute where he was an all-state tennis player.

Buchanan prepared for his career in medicine by attending the University of Chicago before earning a Doctor of Medicine with honors from the St. Louis University School of Medicine. His post-doctoral training began with an internship at the Jackson Memorial Hospital in conjunction with the University of Miami before he completed separate residencies in both psychiatry and neurosurgery at the University of California, San Diego (UCSD). Buchanan completed his formal education with an epilepsy / functional neurosurgery fellowship at Yale University, a psychobiology and psychopharmacology fellowship with the National Institute of Health at UCSD, and a fellowship at the Salk Institute for Biological Studies.

== Career and research ==
Buchanan has published research work regarding various aspects of neurosurgery in a range of peer-reviewed journals, including the Cerebral Cortex, The Proceedings of the National Academy of Sciences, SCIENCE Advances, Hippocampus, and Journal of the International Neuropsychological Society. He has also penned book chapters for medical education texts such as Adult Neurology and the Textbook of Neurological Surgery. He is currently the Editor in Chief of the Clinics In Surgery journal and a member of the editorial board of Neurological Surgery. He is a reviewer for Journal of Neurology, Neurosurgery, and Psychiatry; Epilepsy and Behavior; and Frontiers in Epilepsy.

Buchanan was appointed by Pope Benedict XVI in 2013 to the serve on the Vatican's international bioethics committee called the Pontifical Academy for Life. He chairs its Consciousness, Neuroscience, and Ethics working group which looks to address intersecting issues confronting humanity such as the irreducibility of the moral conscience and the question of free will in the no-freedom theory, libertarianism, and compatibilism; the levels of consciousness and alterations in temporary and persistent consciousness; cognitive and emotional neuroenahncement and deep brain stimulation; the governance of neurotechnologies; and human dignity between functionalist-actualistic theories and substantialistic theories. Buchanan was re-appointed for another five-year term in 2017.

His most recent practice and area of research has been focused on neuromodulation using deep brain stimulation to attenuate neuropsychological and movement related disorders such as Major Depression and Parkinson's respectively. He is the director of the Human Brain Stimulation and Electrophysiology lab as well as the co-director of the Electrophysiology of Learning and Memory (ELM) Lab at UT Austin. In 2014, Buchanan and his team were the first to be able to make in vivo neurochemical measurements using microdialysis from the human basal ganglia while study participants engaged in memory tasks.

In 2019, Buchanan was the first surgeon in Texas to perform a deep brain stimulator surgery for refractory seizures. As of 2020, he is the principal investigator of the University of Texas site for the ADvance II study to evaluate the safety and efficacy of deep brain stimulation of the fornix for patient's with mild Alzheimer's disease.

=== Other distinctions ===
He is a knight in the Sovereign Military Order of Malta.

== Personal life ==
He currently lives in Austin, Texas.
