= Diocese of Gary =

Latin Catholic jurisdiction in the US

Coordinates: 41°34′51″N 87°20′44″W

Diocese of Gary Dioecesis Gariensis
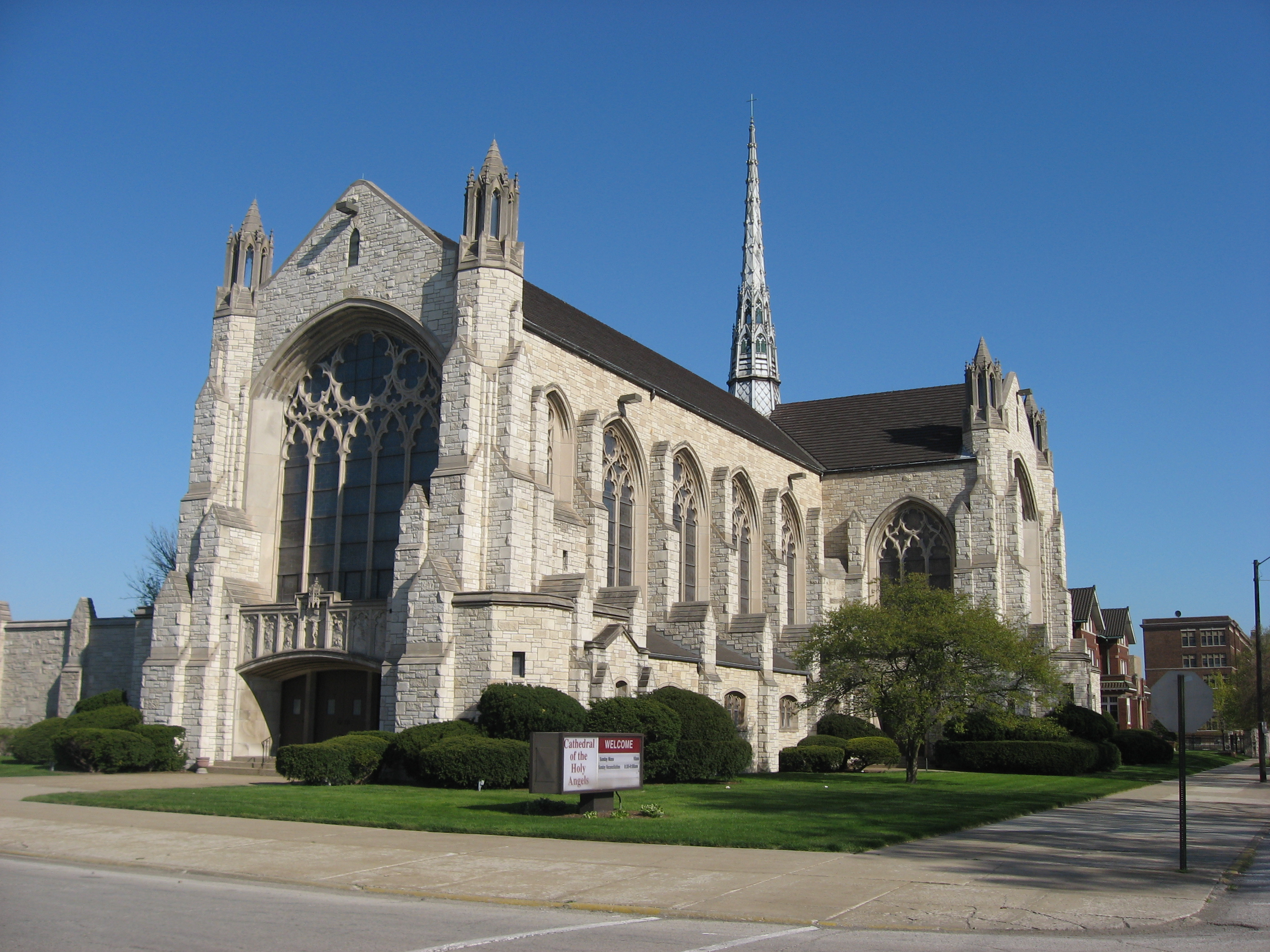
- Cathedral of the Holy Angels

- Coat of arms

Location
- Country: United States
- Territory: The counties of Lake, LaPorte, Porter and Starke in Northwest Indiana
- Ecclesiastical province: Indianapolis

Statistics
- Area: 1,807 sq mi (4,680 km^{2})
- Population: Total; Catholics: (as of 2021); 795,178; 164,293 (20.7%)
- Parishes: 64
- Churches: 72
- Schools: 22

Information
- Denomination: Catholic
- Sui iuris church: Latin Church
- Rite: Roman Rite
- Established: December 17, 1956 (69 years ago)
- Cathedral: Cathedral of the Holy Angels
- Patron saint: Guardian Angels
- Secular priests: 83

Current leadership
- Pope: Leo XIV
- Bishop: Robert John McClory
- Metropolitan Archbishop: Charles C. Thompson
- Vicar General: Very Rev. Christopher Stanish
- Judicial Vicar: Very Rev. Brian D. Chadwick

Map
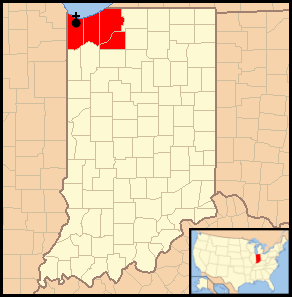
- Territory of the Diocese of Gary

Website
- dcgary.org

The Diocese of Gary (Latin: Dioecesis Gariensis) is a diocese of the Catholic Church in northwest Indiana in the United States. Erected in 1956, it is a suffragan diocese in the ecclesiastical province of the metropolitan Archdiocese of Indianapolis. The mother church is the Cathedral of the Holy Angels in Gary. The bishop is Robert J. McClory.

== Territory ==
The Diocese of Gary includes Lake, Porter, LaPorte, and Starke counties in Indiana.

== History ==
=== 1675 to 1800 ===
During the 17th century, present day Indiana was part of the French colony of New France. The Diocese of Quebec, which had jurisdiction over the colony, sent French missionaries to the region. The first French Jesuit missionaries came to the Vincennes area around 1675. Historical records show that a Father Mermet arrived in Vincennes around 1712, but the length of his visit is unknown. The oldest Catholic Church in Vincennes is St. Francis Xavier, established around 1732.

After the British took control of New France in 1763, the Archdiocese of Quebec retained jurisdiction in the Indiana area. In 1776, at the start of the American Revolution, the new United States claimed sovereignty over the area of Indiana. In 1787, Indiana became part of the Northwest Territory of the United States.

=== 1800 to 1900 ===
With the creation of the Diocese of Bardstown in Kentucky in 1810, supervision of the Indiana Territory shifted there. In 1827, the bishop of the Diocese of St. Louis assumed jurisdiction in the new state of Indiana. In 1834, Pope Gregory XVI erected the Diocese of Vincennes, which included both Indiana and Illinois. Pope Pius IX created the Diocese of Fort Wayne for Indiana only in 1857, including the Gary area. Gary would remain part of this diocese for the next 100 years.

St. Mary the Immaculate Conception Parish, founded in 1867, was the first Catholic parish in Michigan City. In 1879, St. Joseph Church was built in Hammond on land donated by an Episcopalian woman. St. Stanislaus Parish was founded by Polish immigrants in East Chicago in 1886. Three members of the Sisters of Saint Francis Saraph opened St. Margaret's Hospital in a farmhouse in Hammond in 1898.

=== 1900 to 1950 ===
The first Catholic parish in Gary was Holy Angels, established in 1906. During the first half of the 20th century, many Catholic immigrants arrived in Indiana from Eastern Europe and Mexico to work in the region's growing steel industry. In 1908, the Sisters of St. Francis opened St. Mary's Mercy Hospital in Gary to accommodate the increased population. The Diocese of Fort Wayne founded several native language parishes near the steel mills to accommodate these immigrants.

In 1913, the Carmelite Daughters of the Divine Heart of Jesus opened the St. Joseph Carmelite Home, an orphanage in East Chicago. The Poor Handmaids of Jesus Christ in 1928 opened St. Catherine's Hospital in East Chicago.

=== 1950 to 2000 ===
The Missionaries of the Precious Blood in 1951 founded Calumet College of St. Joseph in Hammond, an extension of Saint Joseph's College in Collegeville. Today it is Saint Joseph's College of Indiana.

In 1956, Pope Pius XII erected the Diocese of Gary, removing Lake, Porter, LaPorte, and Starke Counties from the Diocese of Fort Wayne. He named Andrew Grutka of Fort Wayne as the first bishop of Gary. Grutka selected Holy Angels church as his cathedral, renaming it as the Cathedral of the Holy Angels. The new diocese had 129 active diocesan priests, 77 parishes, 60 parish schools and 135,485 Catholics, about 25 percent of the population of the four counties.

The Poor Handmaids of Christ in 1973 founded St. Mary's Hospital in Hobart. Today it is Saint Mary Medical Center Grutka retired in as bishop of Gary in 1984.

Pope John Paul II appointed Auxiliary Bishop Norbert Gaughan of the Diocese of Greensburg as the second bishop of Gary in 1984. During his tenure as bishop, Gaughan ordained three priests. In 1986, he established the Catholic Services Appeal. Gaughan created the “We Can Change the Future” program for the creation of pastoral councils. In 1987, Gaughan started publication of a diocesan newspaper, the Northwest Indiana Catholic.

After Gaughan suffered a stroke, the pope named Auxiliary Bishop Dale Melczek of the Archdiocese of Detroit in 1995 as coadjutor bishop to assist Gaughan. When Gaughan retired as bishop of Gary in 1996, Melczek became bishop of Gary.

=== 2000 to present ===
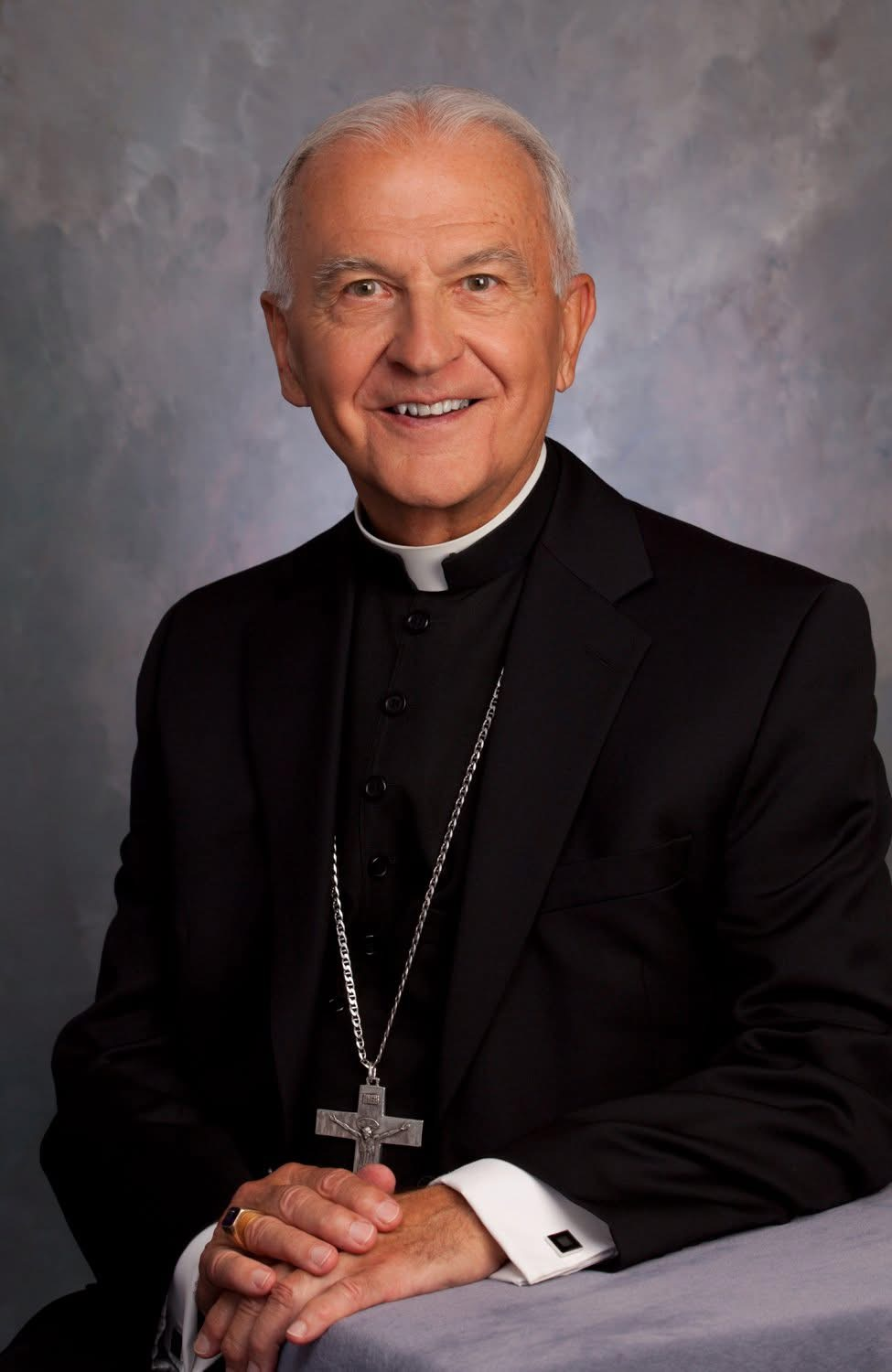
Bishop Melczek (pre-2022)

In 2002, Melczek published “The Many Faces of Our Church: a Pastoral Letter on Cultural Diversity” to discuss the contributions of different races and cultural groups to the Catholic church. Melczek followed it up the next year with “Created in God’s Image: a Pastoral Letter on the Sin of Racism and a Call to Conversion.”

After Melczek retired as bishop of Gary in 2013, Auxiliary Bishop Donald J. Hying of the Archdiocese of Milwaukee became the next bishop. In 2016, Hying called the first synod in Gary with the publication of his pastoral letter, “Go, Therefore, and Make Disciples of All Nations”. He began an initiative in 2017 to focus on evangelization, vocations, and other topics within the diocese.

In 2019, Pope Francis named Hying bishop of the Diocese of Madison and appointed Robert McClory of Detroit to succeed Hying. The Dean and Barbara White Family Foundation in June 2024 announced a $150 million donation to the diocese for its schools.

The diocese in March 2026 announced plans to consolidate 41 parishes, with one parish closing and several others merging. The reasons cited for the move including the aging of the diocesan priests, the age of some church facilities and population shifts in the region.

=== Sex Abuse ===
In December 2003, Bishop Melczek removed Don Grass from ministry after the priest admitted to sexually abusing a preteen girl. The victim reported the incident to the diocese in 2003, saying that the crime happened during the 1960s while Grass was assigned to Cathedral of the Holy Angels Parish. Grass was never returned to ministry.

The diocese in August 2018 published a list of ten priests with credible accusations of sexual abuse of minors.

== Statistics ==
As of 2025, the Diocese of Gary had 119 priests, 70 permanent deacons, 12 religious brothers, and 48religious sisters. The diocese had a Catholic population of 170,144 in 51 parishes.

The diocese also supervised three homes for the aged, three protective homes, three cemeteries, and Catholic Charities, Diocese of Gary.

== Bishops ==
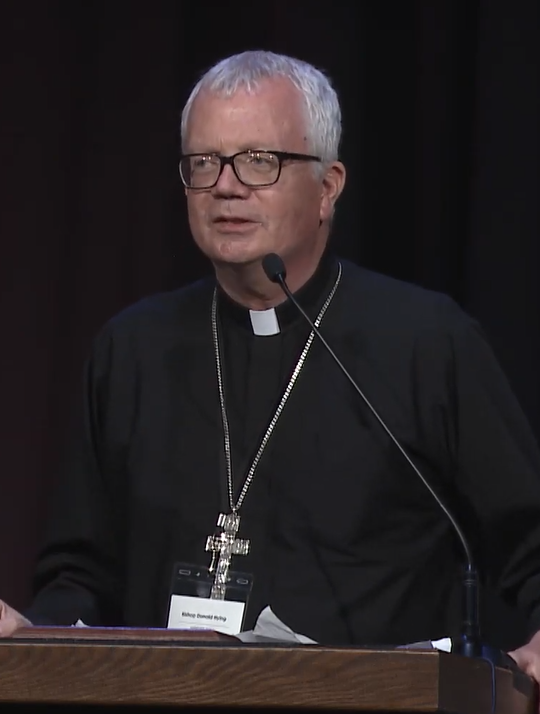
Bishop Hying (2022)

=== Bishops of Gary ===
- Andrew Gregory Grutka (1956–1984)
- Norbert Felix Gaughan (1984–1996)
- Dale Joseph Melczek (1996–2014)
- Donald J. Hying (2014–2019), appointed Bishop of Madison.
- Robert John McClory ( 2019–present)

=== Coadjutor bishop ===
Dale Joseph Melczek (1995–1996)

=== Other diocesan priest who became bishop ===
Carl Frederick Mengeling, appointed Bishop of Lansing

== Education ==
In 2025, the diocese had 17 elementary schools, three diocesan high schools, two independent high schools with over 12,000 enrolled students.

=== Secondary schools ===
==== Operated by diocese ====
- Andrean High School – Merrillville
- Bishop Noll Institute – Hammond
- Marquette Catholic High School – Michigan City

==== Independent ====
- La Lumiere School – La Porte
- Sacred Heart Apostolic School – Rolling Prairie

=== Colleges ===
- Calumet College of St. Joseph – Whiting

== Traditional Latin Mass ==
In 2018, Bishop Hying invited the Institute of Christ the King to begin an apostolate at St. Joseph Parish in Hammond, offering the traditional LatIn mass on a weekly basis. In 2022, the diocese moved its celebration to Merrillville at the Our Lady of Czestochowa Shrine. In 2015, the NWI Latin Mass Community was founded by laity to support and promote the mass in the diocese

In 2018, a Solemn High Mass was offered at the Cathedral of the Holy Angels by Auxiliary Bishop Joseph Perry from the Archdiocese of Chicago. Previously, a Traditional Latin Mass was available at St. Stanislaus in Michigan City, but this mass was discontinued when the celebrant died. For 28 years the Carmelite Shrine in Munster offered regularly. It was established in 1990 at the recommendation of Bishop Gaughan.
