= Andrew G. Grutka =

American prelate

His Excellency, The Most Reverend Andrew Gregory Grutka D.D.
- Bishop of Gary
- See: Diocese of Gary
- In office: February 25, 1957, to July 9, 1984
- Predecessor: Position established
- Successor: Norbert Felix Gaughan

Orders
- Ordination: December 5, 1933 by Francesco Marchetti Selvaggiani
- Consecration: February 25, 1957 by Amleto Giovanni Cicognani

Personal details
- Born: November 17, 1908 Joliet, Illinois, US
- Died: November 11, 1993 (aged 84) Valparaiso, Indiana, US
- Buried: Cathedral of the Holy Angels
- Denomination: Catholic Church
- Education: Pontifical North American College
- Motto: Ubi caritas ibi Deus (Where there is love, there is God)

Styles of Andrew Gregory Grutka
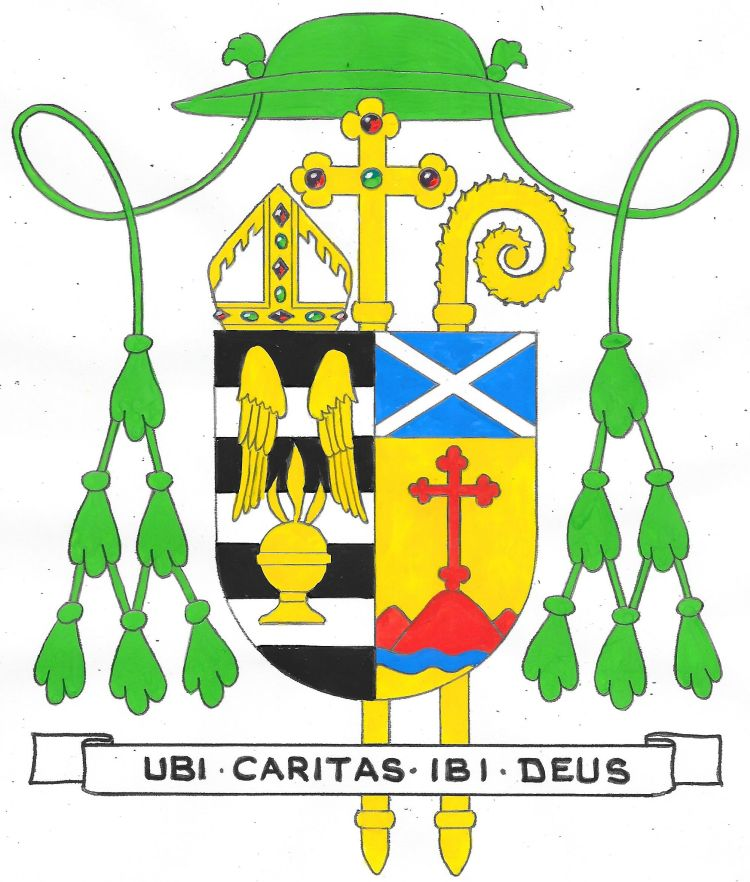
- Reference style: The Most Reverend
- Spoken style: Your Excellency
- Religious style: Bishop
- Posthumous style: not applicable

Andrew Gregory Grutka (November 17, 1908 – November 11, 1993) was an American prelate of the Roman Catholic Church. He served as first bishop of the Diocese of Gary in Indiana from 1956 to 1984.

== Biography ==
=== Early life ===
Andrew Grutka was born on November 17, 1908, in Joliet, Illinois, the son of Slovak immigrants from Spišská Stará Ves. He studied for the priesthood at the Pontifical North American College in Rome.

Grutka was ordained a priest on December 5, 1933, by Cardinal Francesco Selvaggiani for the Diocese of Fort Wayne. Grutka was serving as the pastor of Holy Trinity Parish in Gary, Indiana, on his final pastoral assignment.

=== Bishop of Gary ===
On December 29, 1956, Grutka was named bishop of the newly created Diocese of Gary by Pope Pius XII. He was consecrated at the Cathedral of the Holy Angels in Gary, Indiana, by Archbishop Amleto Giovanni Cicognani Bishops John Cody and Leo Pursley were the principal co-consecrators. In 1959, Andrean High School in Merrillville, Indiana, was named for Grutka's patron saint, Andrew the Apostle. From 1962 to 1965, Grutka attended all four sessions of the Second Vatican Council in Rome and was responsible for implementing the council's reforms in the diocese.

=== Retirement and legacy ===
Pope John Paul II accepted Grutka's resignation as bishop of Gary on July 9, 1984. After his resignation, Grutka remained active in the diocese, ministering to parishioners.

Andrew Grutka died at his home in Valparaiso, Indiana, on November 11, 1993, at age 85. He was entombed in the east transept of Cathedral of the Holy Angels.

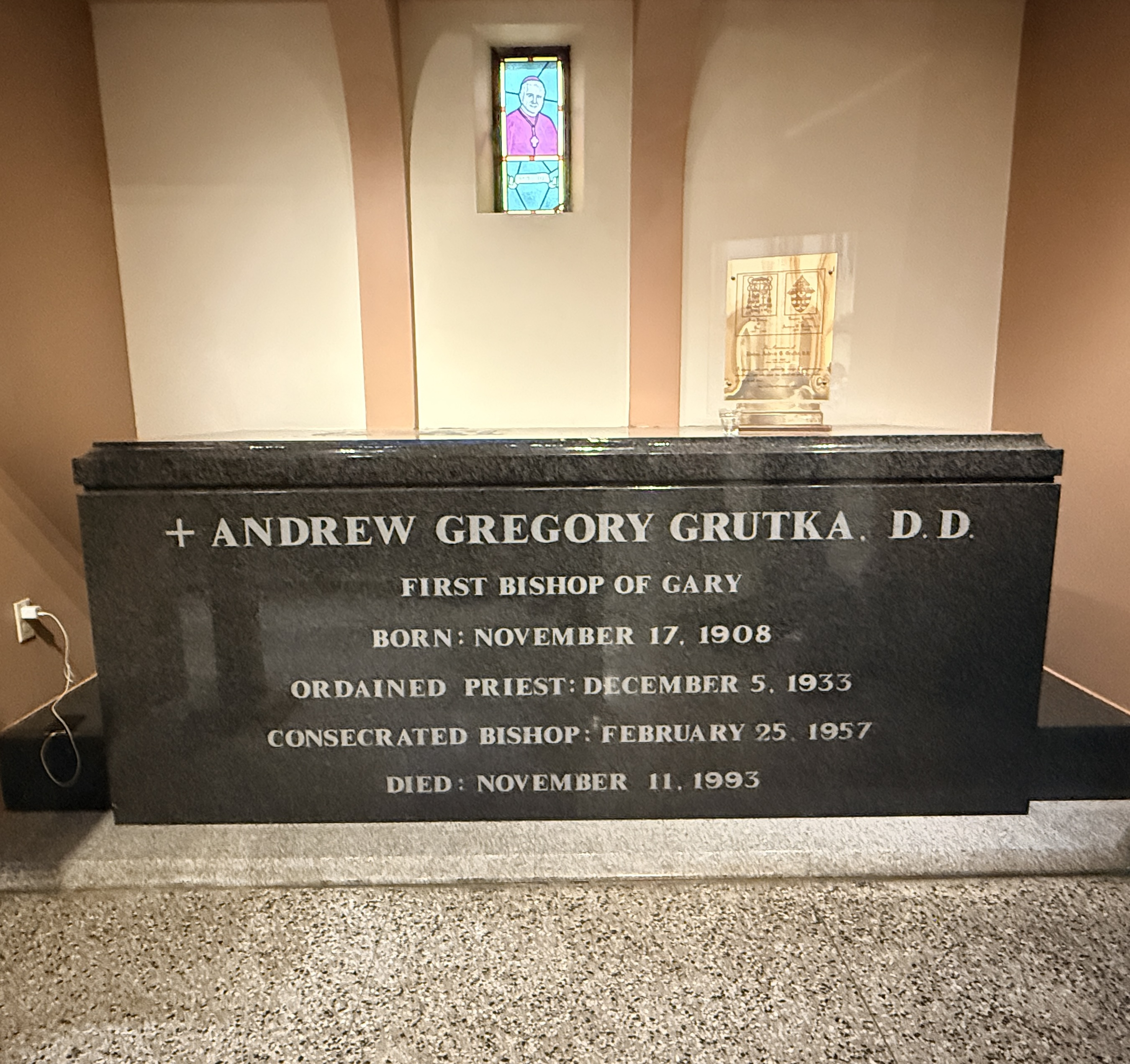
Bishop Grutka's grave

Catholic Church titles
Preceded by None	Bishop of Gary; 1957–1984	Succeeded by Norbert Felix Gaughan
