= Saint Emma Monastery =

Benedictine monastery in Greensburg, Pennsylvania

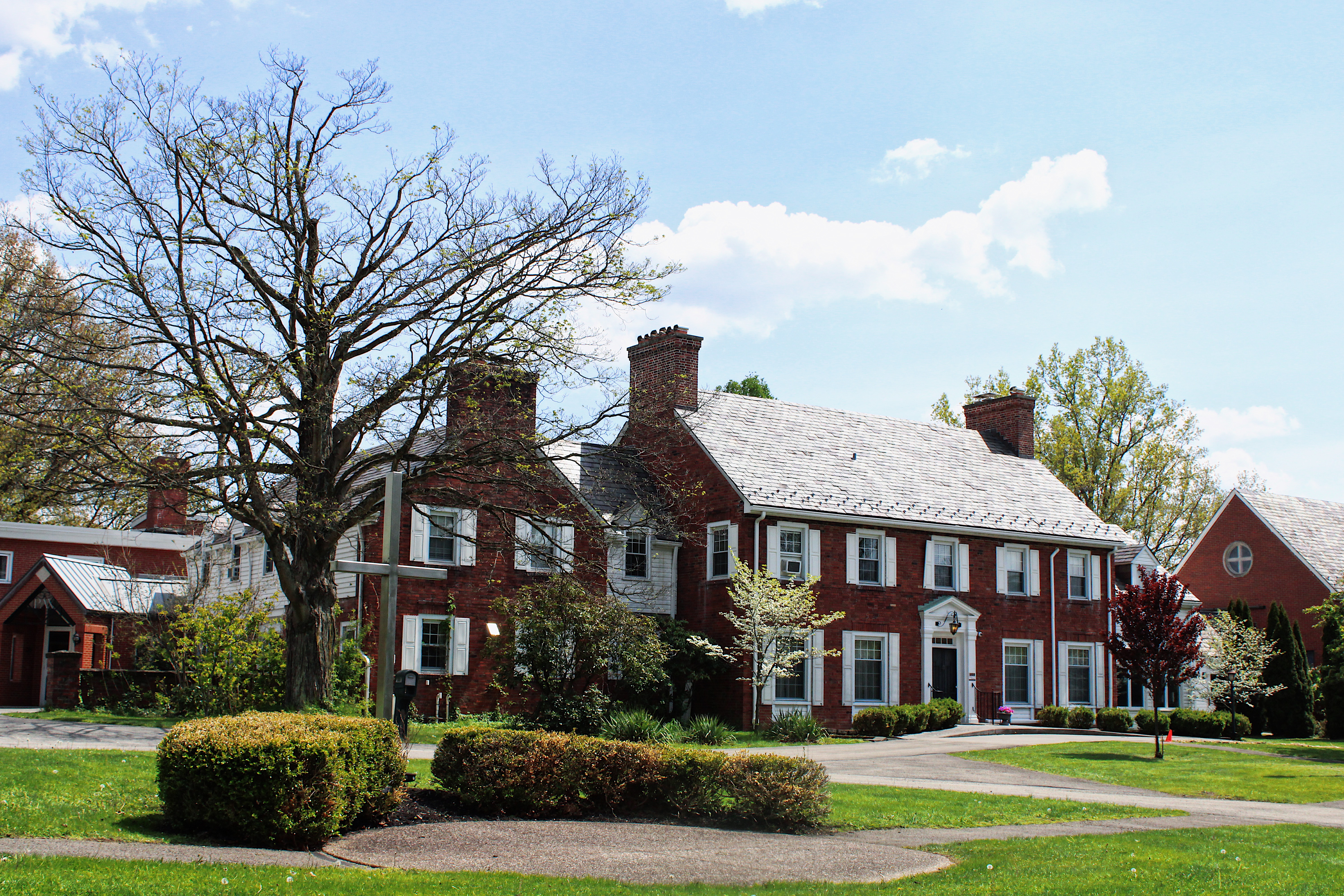

- Location within Pennsylvania

Religion
- Affiliation: Catholic (Benedictine Nuns)

Location
- Location: 1001 Harvey Avenue, Greensburg, Pennsylvania 15601
- Country: United States
- Interactive map of Saint Emma Monastery
- Coordinates: 40°20′6.36″N 79°31′59.52″W

Website
- https://stemma.org/

Saint Emma Monastery (founded 1931) is a Roman Catholic retreat house and monastery for the Sisters of Saint Benedict of Westmoreland County, located in Greensburg, Pennsylvania.

The current Prioress is Mother Mary Anne Noll OSB.

== History ==
After World War I, the Abbey of Benedictine Nuns of Saint Walpurga in Eichstätt, Bavaria experienced a rapid increase of vocations. At the same time, Saint Vincent Archabbey in Latrobe, was in debt, in part due to the Wall Street crash of 1929.

The abbey decided to send a group from Bavaria to Pennsylvania. Mother Leonarda Fitz OSB and ten sisters from Bavaria arrived in Western Pennsylvania on Walpurgis Night (February 25), 1931. They established their community at St. Emma and assisted the archabbey through their efforts.

After the onset of World War II, Mother Leonarda received instruction "to look out for yourselves". Mother Leonarda took this to mean "buy your own property". Under the direction of Mother Leonarda, the sisters purchased a property for St. Emma Monastery and Retreat House from John Robertshaw Sr. in 1943. In 1944, the archabbey bought an adjacent farm owned by the Robertshaw family.

When the Catholic Church created the Diocese of Greensburg in 1951, the first bishop, Rev. Hugh Lamb, lived at St. Emma's while making the initial arrangements. St. Emma also served as the diocesan chancery for the first year.

The sisters built a retreat house in 1954. The sisters built the first monastery wing in 1960 and the second wing in 1963.

In 1961, the sisters began to pray the Liturgy of the Hours in English.
