= Cathedral of the Holy Angels (Gary, Indiana) =

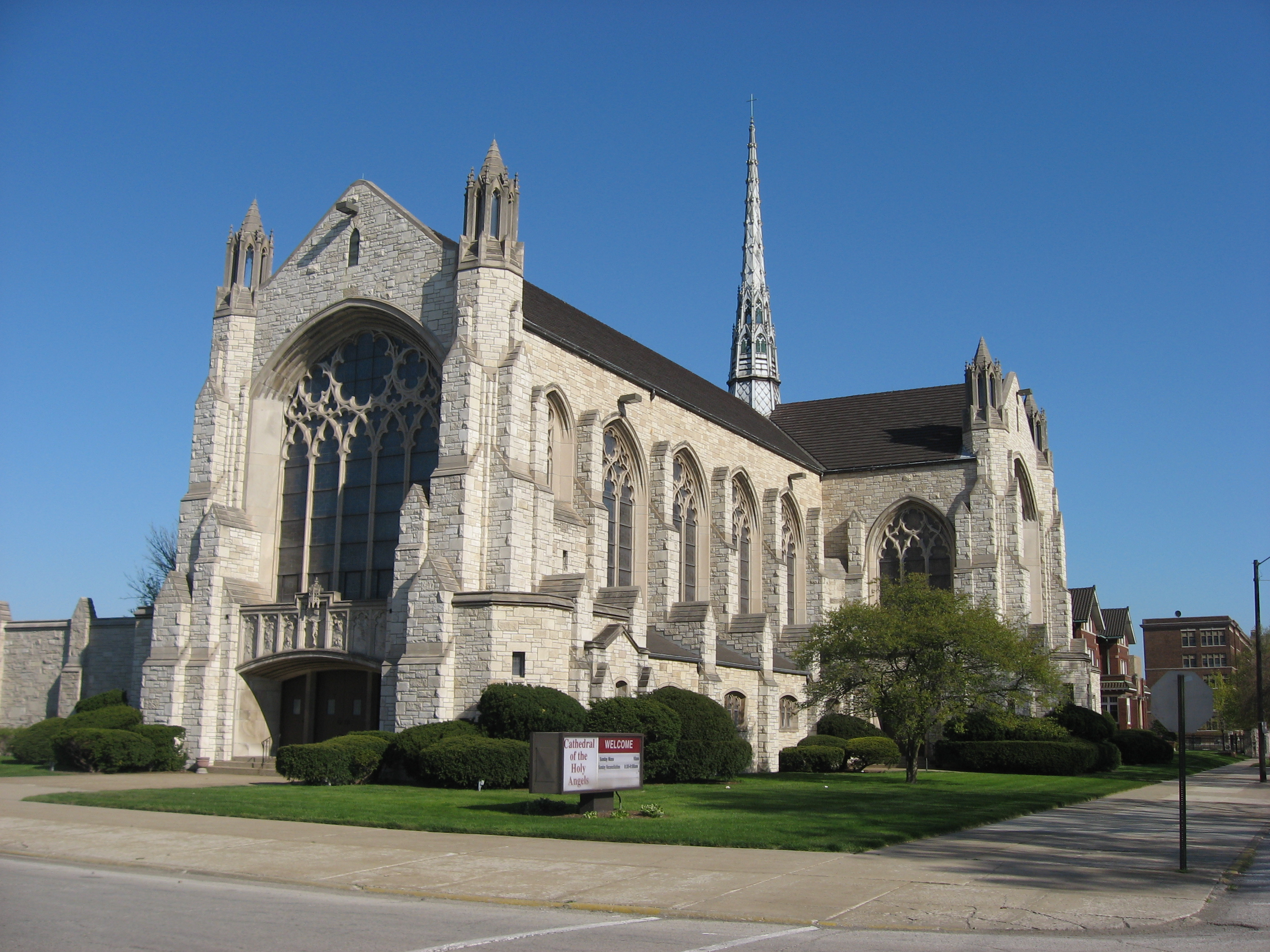
- Cathedral from the southeast in 2012

- Location within Indiana Location within the United States
- 41°35′55.99″N 87°20′55.93″W
- Location: 640 Tyler Street; Gary, Indiana
- Country: United States
- Denomination: Roman Catholic Church
- Website: garycathedral.org

History
- Status: Cathedral/Parish
- Founded: September 1906 (parish)
- Founder: Msgr. F. Thomas Jansen
- Dedication: Holy Angels
- Dedicated: January 29, 1950

Architecture
- Functional status: Active
- Style: Gothic Revival
- Groundbreaking: 1947

Specifications
- Materials: Limestone

Administration
- Diocese: Gary

Clergy
- Bishop: Most Rev. Robert John McClory
- Rector: Rev. Jayababu Nuthulapati

The Cathedral of the Holy Angels is a Catholic cathedral located in Gary, Indiana, in the United States. It is the seat of the Diocese of Gary, and the home of Holy Angels Parish.

== History ==
=== Holy Angels Church ===
During the 19th century, Catholics living in the Gary area did not have their own church. Visiting priests from the Diocese of Fort Wayne would celebrate masses and perform sacraments for them in private homes. In 1906, the bishop of Fort Wayne erected Holy Angels Parish, the first parish in the city. Reverend Thomas F. Jansen celebrated the first mass in the parish in a tavern on Fifth and Broadway in Gary.

In 1908, the parish opened a combination school and parish building. Holy Angels School opened in 1909 with the School Sisters of Notre Dame as the faculty. The parishioners were mostly Eastern European, Irish, German and Italian immigrants.

By 1934, Holy Angels Parish had more than 3,000 members. During the 1940s, the parish began planning for a new church. After the end of World War II in 1945, the cornerstone for the new Holy Angels Church was laid on October 26, 1947. It was dedicated on January 29, 1950, by Bishop John F. Noll.

=== Cathedral of the Holy Angels ===
When Pope Pius XII established the Diocese of Gary on December 10, 1956, Holy Angels Church was designated as the Cathedral of the Holy Angels.

In the 1960s, the primarily Caucasian parish began to change as African American and Latin American parishioners joined Holy Angels when St. Anthony's and Sacred Heart churches closed. The school building and convent were torn down in 1965, replaced by a two-story facility costing $1.2 million. The building contained school classrooms, a convent, gymnasium, cafeteria and space for a parish hall.

The cathedral was renovated in 1972. In 1994, the school was renamed as the Sister Thea Bowman School. The cathedral underwent a second renovation in 1997.

== Cathedral interior ==
=== Nave ===
The baptismal pool is located near the front entrance of the cathedral. The pool is made of travertine marble; the four pillars at the base were recycled from the original high altar. The base and the top of the ambry, where the holy oils are kept, were constructed with materials from the former baptismal font. The upper section is made of black walnut.

=== Reservation Chapel ===
The Reservation Chapel is the location of the tabernacle, which houses the Blessed Sacrament. This space is designed for the sick and for parishioners who wish to spend time in devotional prayer. A cross is formed behind the tabernacle by four carved angels in adoration.

=== Sanctuary ===
The altar is constructed of marble and is roughly square in shape. In the floor surrounding the altar are angels in mosaic. The apse contains the reredos from a previous high altar with a Calvary grouping. The cathedra, or bishop's chair, sits in the presbytery in front of the old reredos. It is carved from black walnut and was installed in 1996. A carved angel stands next to the chair. The ambo is constructed of the same materials as the altar and reredos.

=== Holy Angels Shrine ===
The Holy Angels Shrine is located in the east transept. It includes an icon of the Synaxis of the Holy Angels, which was created in an Ethiopian-Coptic style. The shrine is dedicated to deceased parishioners and the diocesan priests. Bishop Andrew Gregory Grutka, the first bishop of Gary, was interred here in 1993.

== Pastors and rectors ==
The following priests have served as the parish pastors and since 1956 they have served as cathedral rector:

1. F. Thomas Jansen (1906 – 1942)
2. John A. Sullivan (1942 – 1963)
3. John C. Witte (1963 – 1968)
4. Casimir E. Sederak (1968 – 1971)
5. Don C. Grass (1971 – 1983)
6. Richard A. Emerson (1983)
7. Joseph A. Viater (1983 – 1985)
8. William E. Vogt (1985 – 1986)
9. Andrew Daniels, OFM Cap (1986 – 1992)
10. Matthew Iwuji (1992 – 1997)
11. Robert P. Gehring (1997 – 2007)
12. Jon J. Plavcan (2007 – 2012)
13. Michael J. Kopil (2012 – 2016)
14. Kevin P. McCarthy (2016 – 2018)
15. Michael Surufka, OFM (2019 – 2026)
16. Jayababu Nuthulapati (2026 - )
Images of cathedral campus

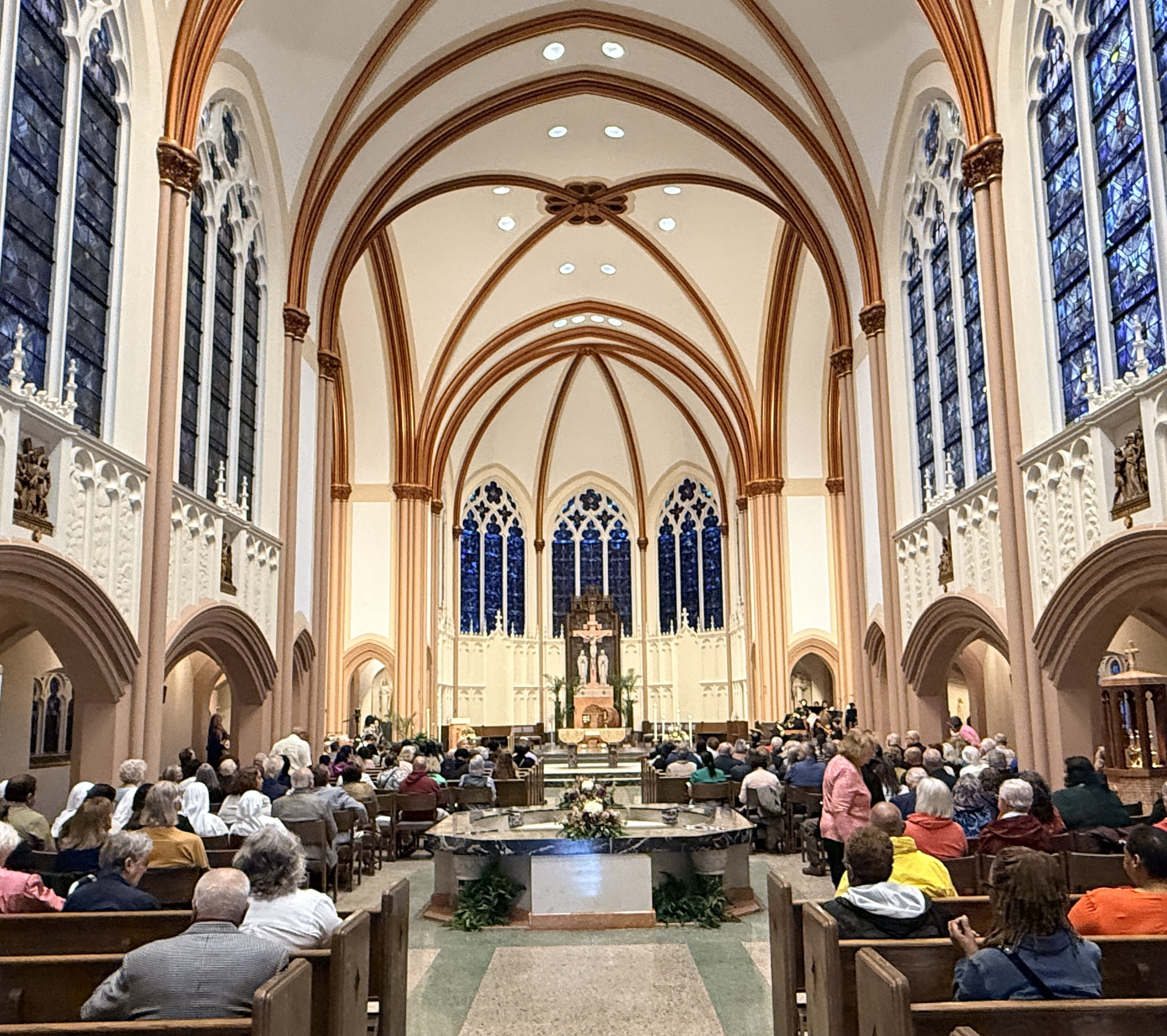
Interior (2026)

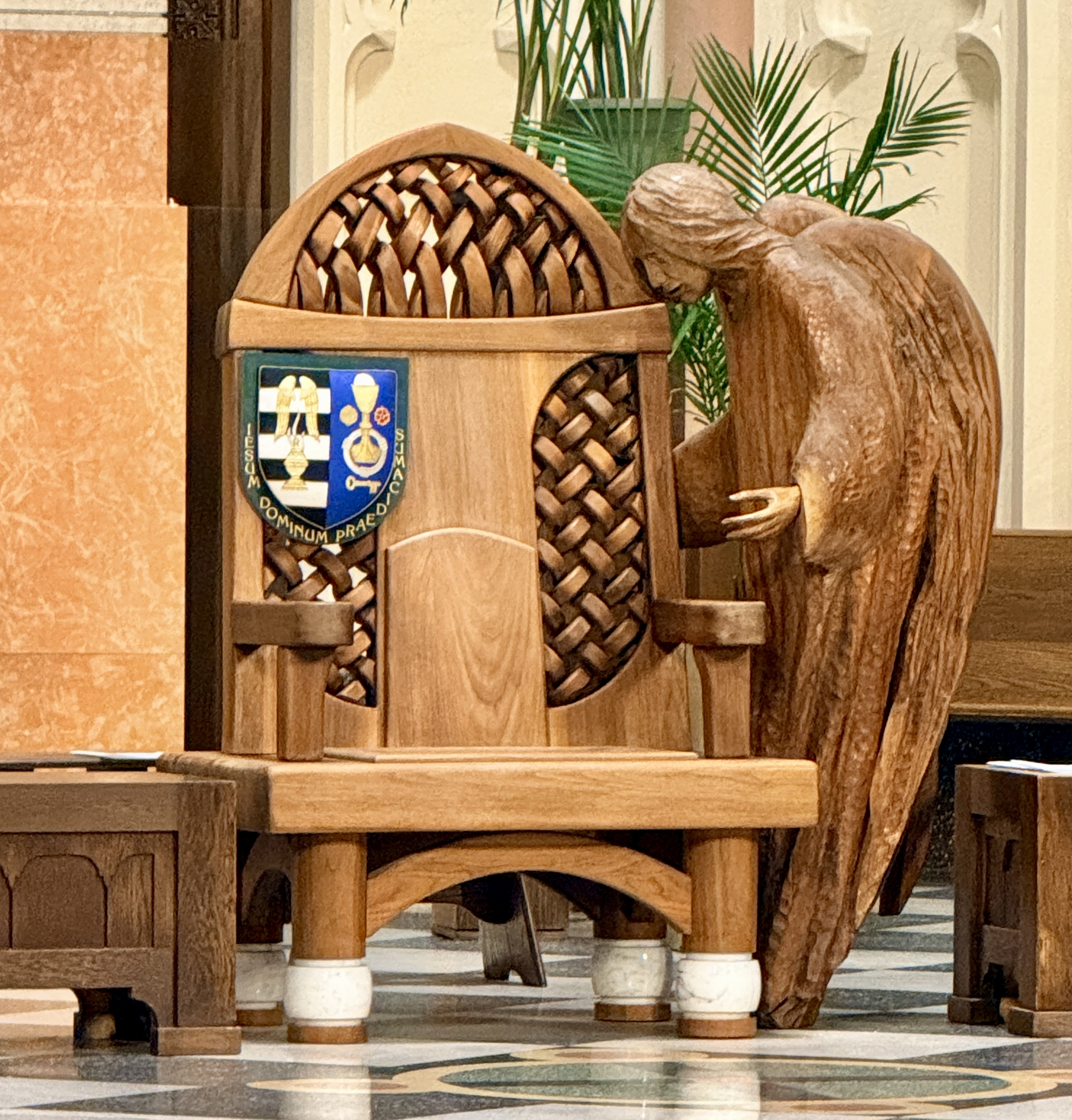
Cathedra (2026)

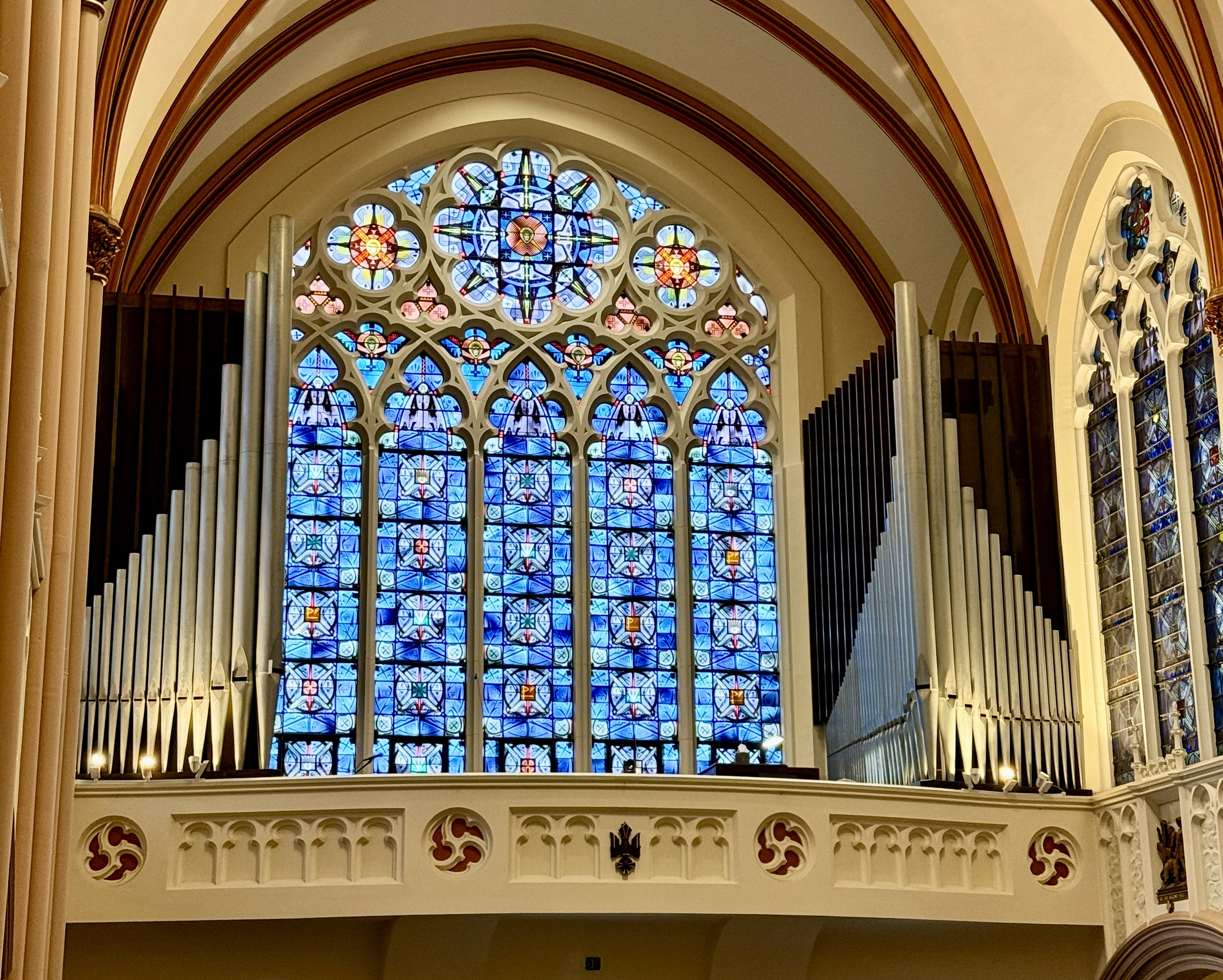
Pipe organ and window (2026)

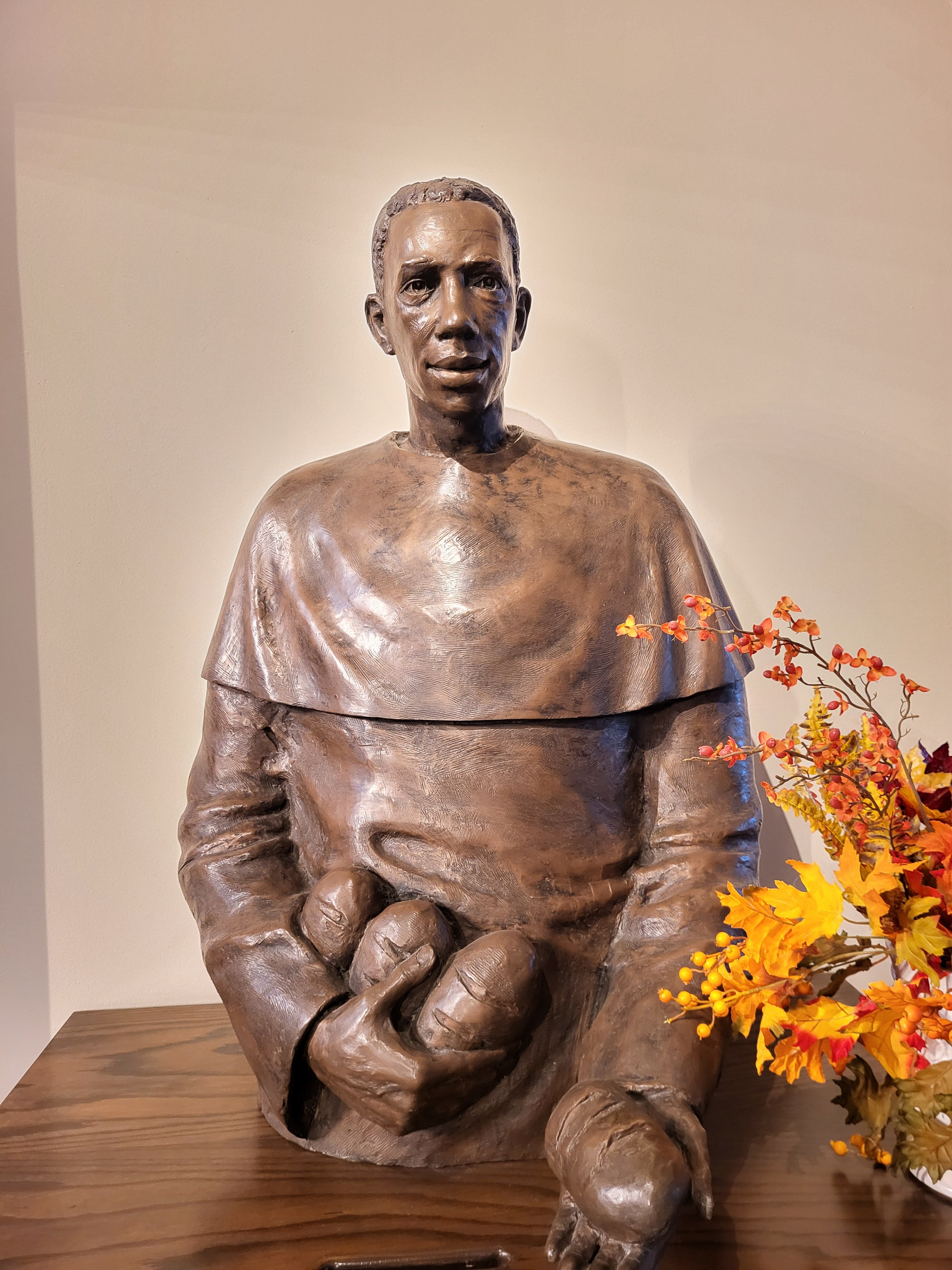
Statue of Martin de Porres (2024)

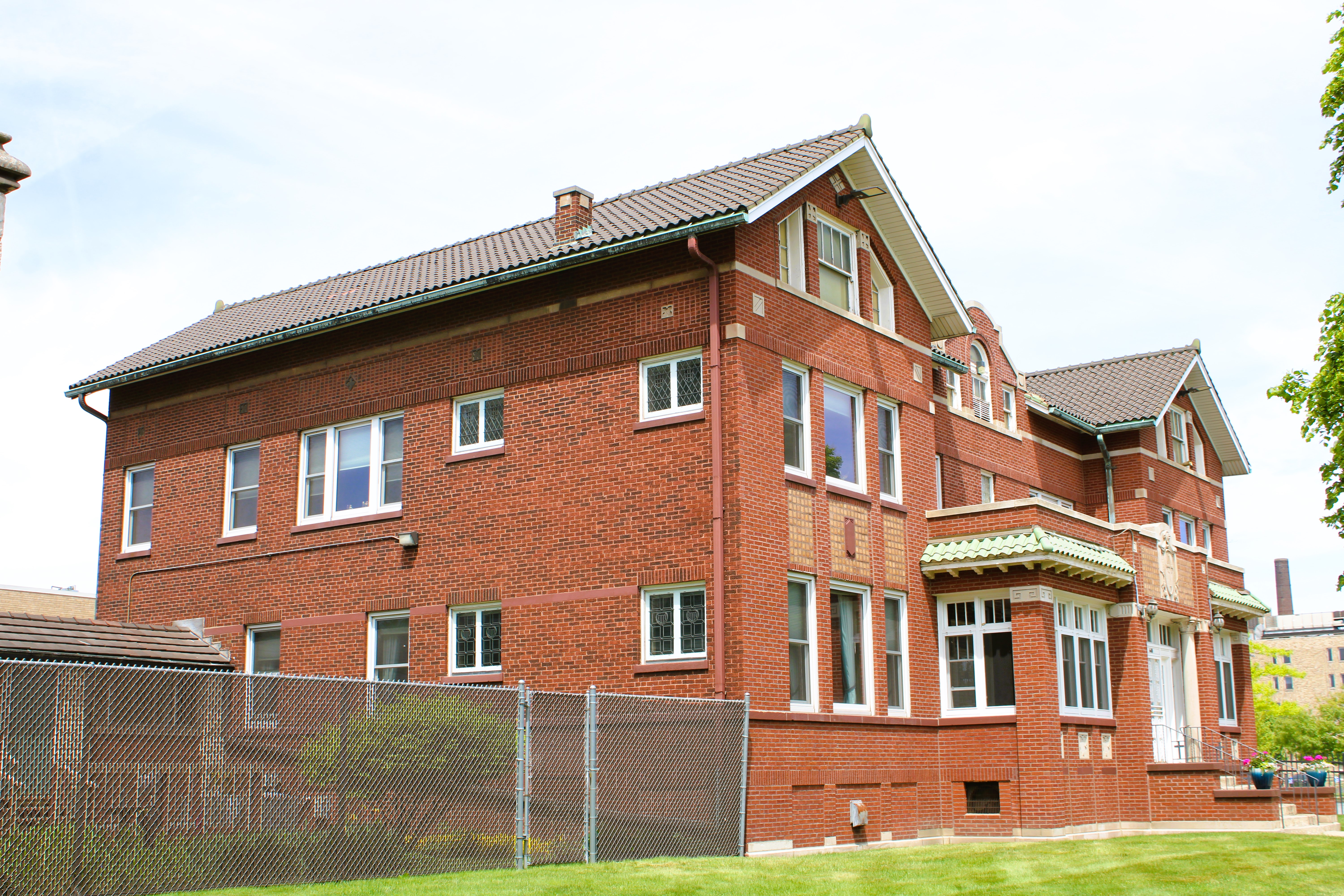
Rectory (2023)

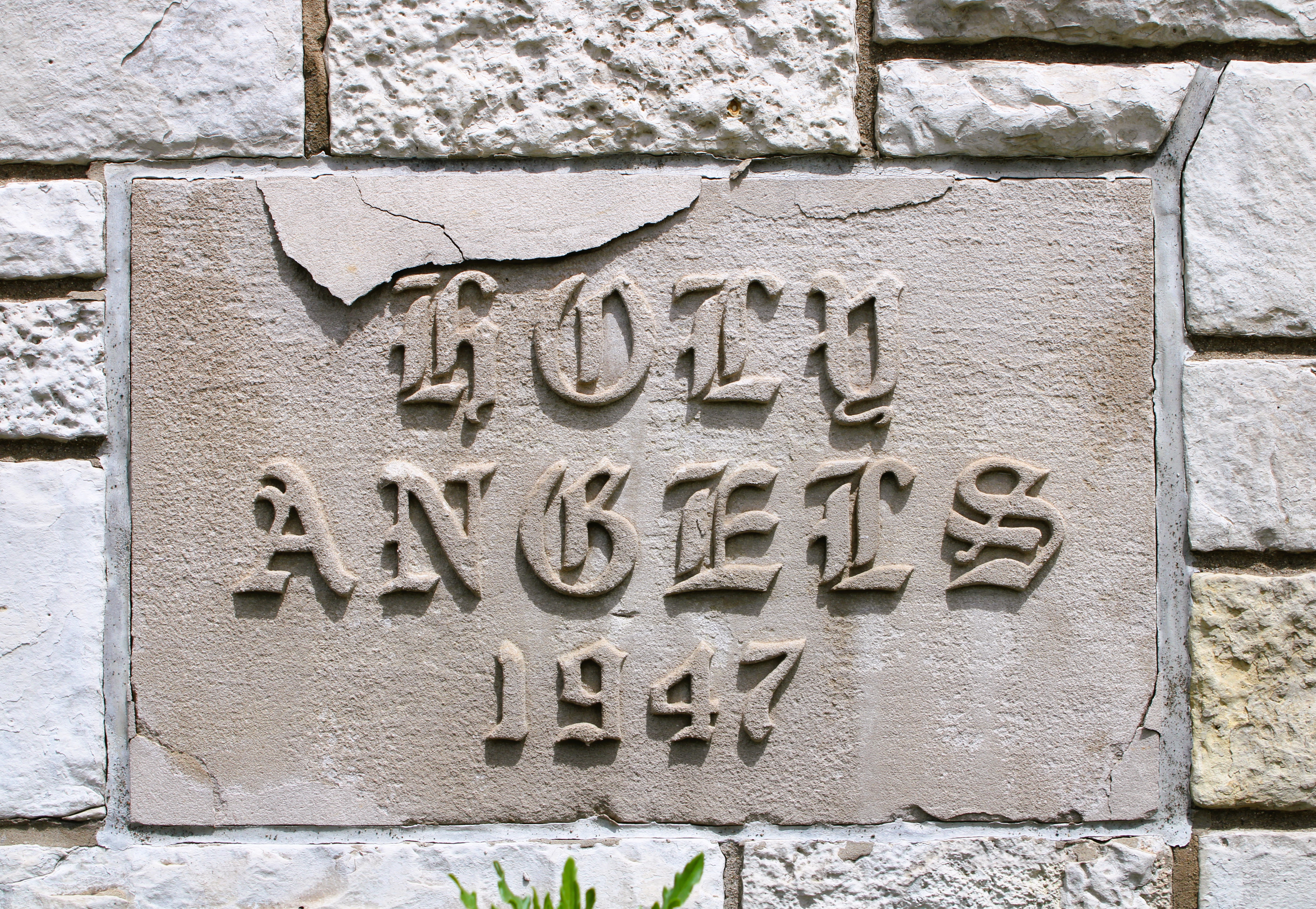
Cornerstone (2023)

== See also ==
- List of Catholic cathedrals in the United States
- List of cathedrals in the United States
