= Walter Joseph Schoenherr =

American bishop

The Most Reverend Walter J. Schoenherr
- Auxiliary Bishop of Detroit
- Church: Catholic Church
- See: Titular See of Timidana
- Appointed: March 8, 1968
- In office: May 1, 1968 – March 7, 1995

Orders
- Ordination: October 27, 1945 by Edward Mooney
- Consecration: March 8, 1968 by John Francis Dearden

Personal details
- Born: February 28, 1920 Center Line, Michigan
- Died: April 27, 2007 (aged 87) Livonia, Michigan

Walter Joseph Schoenherr (February 28, 1920 – April 27, 2007) was an American bishop of the Catholic Church. He served as an auxiliary bishop of the Archdiocese of Detroit from 1968 until 1995.

== Biography ==
Born in Center Line, Michigan, Schoenherr was ordained a priest for the Archdiocese of Detroit on October 27, 1945. On March 8, 1968, Pope Paul VI appointed him as the Titular Bishop of Timidana and Auxiliary Bishop of Detroit. He was consecrated a bishop by Archbishop John Dearden on May 1, 1968. The principal co-consecrators were Bishop Alexander M. Zaleski of Lansing and Detroit auxiliary bishop Joseph M. Breitenbeck. Schoenherr continued to serve as an auxiliary bishop until his resignation was accepted by Pope John Paul II on March 7, 1995. He died April 27, 2007, at the age of 87.
