= St. Mary Church (Lansing) =

First Roman Catholic Church of Lansing, Michigan

- Saint Mary Roman Catholic Church of Lansing
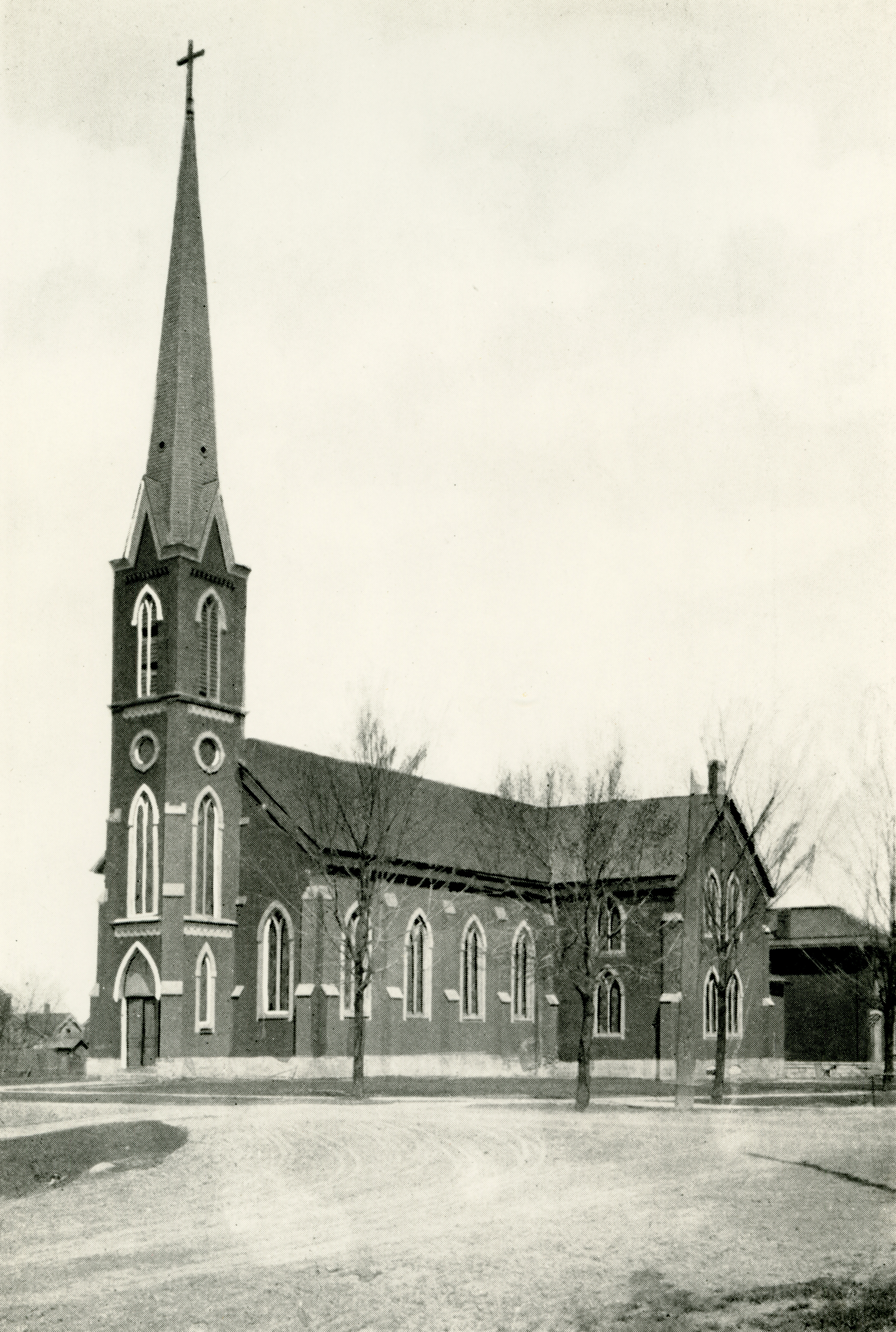
- The Saint Mary Church in Lansing, Michigan, in winter (ca. 1881) viewed from across the intersection of Madison and Chestnut Street. The parsonage can be seen just north of the church, at the far right of the photo, and a one-story addition is barely visible around the corner of the transept.
- St. Mary Church
- 42.7424804°N 84.5590588°W
- Location: 807 North Chestnut Street Lansing, Michigan (former address)
- Country: United States
- Language(s): English, German
- Denomination: Roman Catholic

History
- Former name: First Catholic Church of Lansing
- Status: demolished
- Founder: Fr. Francis X. Krutil
- Dedication: Saint Mary
- Dedicated: February 19, 1865; 161 years ago
- Consecrated: August 4, 1866
- Events: Cornerstone laid: September 8, 1859; Addition: 1873; Transept added: 1879; Spire added: 1880

Architecture
- Architectural type: parish church
- Style: Romanesque Revival, Gothic Revival
- Years built: 1856-1864
- Groundbreaking: 1856; 170 years ago
- Completed: November 23, 1864
- Construction cost: $2,000
- Closed: January 1, 1904
- Demolished: 1905; 121 years ago

Specifications
- Capacity: 425+ (after 1879)
- Length: 120 ft (37 m)
- Width: 80 ft (24 m)
- Materials: red brick

Administration
- Archdiocese: Roman Catholic Archdiocese of Detroit
- Parish: St. Mary Parish, Lansing (August 4, 1866)

Clergy
- Pastor(s): Rev. Fr. Louis Van den Driessche (Van Driss) (August 4, 1866-April 1891); Rev. Fr. Timothy F. Slattery (May 1891-November 1897)^{Note E} Fr. Lafayette Isadore Brancheau (December 1897-January 1, 1905) (January 1, 1905-December 1913 at parish hall) (December 1913-November 1915 at St. Mary Cathedral)

Saint Mary Church of Lansing was the first Catholic church built in Lansing, Michigan, as well as having the distinction of the first brick church edifice, brick parsonage and church bells in the city. It was part of the Roman Catholic Archdiocese of Detroit. The church was dedicated in 1866 and served the parish until 1904. It was demolished in 1905 and eventually replaced by the Cathedral of the Immaculate Conception in 1913.

== Location ==
St. Mary Church was built at the intersection of Chestnut Street and Madison Street, on the northwest corner in what is now known as the Old Forest Neighborhood, on land donated by Thomas and Aleaneas (Elenora) N. Saier (née Vogelweid), who came to Lansing from Württemberg, Germany in 1851 and who held the first Catholic mass in Lansing in 1854 at their log cabin. From 1859 until the church was dedicated in 1865, Catholic services in Lansing were held irregularly at Representative Hall, the senate room in the Second Capitol Building at Allegan and Washtenaw. Lansing remained a mission of Corunna, receiving a visit by a missionary priest approximately every three months until 1866.

== Architecture ==
The St. Mary Church was an early (1860s) example of a mixed Romanesque Revival/Gothic Revival style with Germanic influences. The distinctive lines of the red brick structure, tower, and gabled roof are Romanesque elements, while the pointed-arch windows and tall, steep spire are characteristic of Gothic architecture. Later churches that employed this mix of styles are the 1878 St. Patrick's Parish Complex (Ann Arbor, Michigan), the St. Patrick Church (Shepherd, Michigan) and the 1883 St. Francis Xavier Catholic Church and Rectory (Taos, Missouri). However, the extant churches of this style lack the unique transept that transformed the St. Mary Church into a cathedral layout with a cross-gabled roof, which are elements of the Gothic Revival style. This was to be the first church edifice (and parsonage) in Lansing that were built of brick.

== Early construction ==
Between 1856 and 1866, Lansing was in the territory of missionary priests from Corunna, a city thirty five miles to the northeast. Father Francis X. Krutil, a Moravian Redemptorist from the first (1841) St. Mary Roman Catholic Church (Detroit), was sent as a missionary by Bishop Peter Paul Lefevere to serve the Catholics of Lansing and other outlying areas in January, 1856. He was reportedly an 11-language polyglot, known for his ability to unite immigrants of different nationalities. He served 39 missions in the midwest from 1852-1858, typically spending 10 days at a time in any community. Fr. Krutil accepted the donation of two lots offered by Thomas and Eleanora Saier (née Vogelueidt) for the construction of a new church. The lots (E5 and E6) were at the top of a hill at the edge of town and had already been partially cleared for use as pasture land. Groundbreaking was held the year he arrived, the cellar was completed, and work was begun on a 36 by 50 foot foundation for the church.^{Note A}

In July 1857 the church in Lansing (still little more than a cellar at the time) was placed under the care of the newly completed Corunna Church of the Annunciation of the Blessed Virgin Mary, itself a mission of St. Michael's Church of Flint, a parish of the Roman Catholic Archdiocese of Detroit. The mission was administered by Most Rev. Peter Paul Lefevere, the Coadjutor Bishop of the Archdiocese.

== Hiatus ==
Although the corner-stone for the building was laid by Bishop Le Fevere on September 8, 1859 (marking the first time a Catholic bishop visited Lansing) and the foundation commenced using funds raised from the local Catholic community, construction was halted after the completion of the cellar and foundation due to a lack of funds and organization. At the time, only about 30 families comprised the congregation.

== Completion and dedication ==
Rev. Louis Van den Driessche (Van Driss) became pastor of the Annunciation in Corunna and its missions in December 1863, and took a special interest in the Lansing community, raising about $1,000 in funds to complete the church. Construction resumed in 1863 under his direction. Because of the persistence of Rev. Van Driss, the main building of the church, 40 by 60 feet, was completed in autumn 1864, although late in construction, the workers removed and buried the stained glass windows for lack of payment. Rev. Van Driss wrote to Bishop Caspar Henry Borgess for assistance, who allocated $200 to settle accounts and have the windows re-installed. On February 19, 1865 the church was dedicated and the congregation began to hold regular weekly services there instead of their informal prior location at Representative Hall. "Elaborate decoration"^{Note B} was added to the interior of the church in the spring of 1866. On August 4, 1866, the Bishop of Detroit officially constituted the Saint Mary Church of Lansing. Father Van Driss was appointed as its first pastor, who reportedly walked to Lansing from Detroit after his appointment on New Year's Day 1866. He would serve there until April 1891.

== Additions ==
The St. Mary church underwent numerous changes over its 50 year history. A brick parsonage was built on the grounds in 1870 as a permanent residence for the pastor, which was a first for Lansing. In 1873, a 36 by 50 foot addition to the edifice of the church was built to accommodate a growing congregation. In 1873, a six room wooden parochial school was built a block north of the church, and in 1879, seating was expanded by adding a pair of 20 by 30 foot two-story wings to the east and west sides of the earlier addition, forming a transept, which was a highly unusual feature for this style of church, as it required the removal and replacement of large sections of the edifice with structural arches. The tower and spire were completed soon after in 1880, the spire and one of the three bells having been paid for personally by Rev. Van Driss. By that time, the congregation numbered approximately 900, with 850 regularly attending Sunday services. The church was notable at the time for having the only church bells in Lansing.^{Note C}

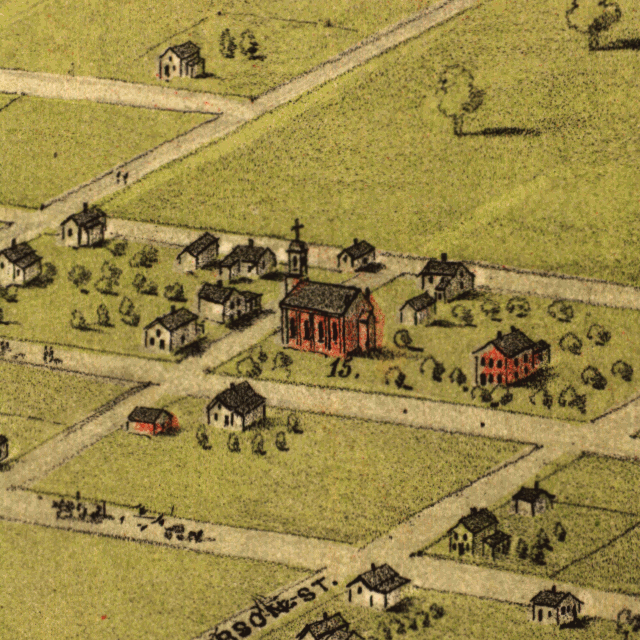
An aerial view of the First Catholic Church in Lansing, as "15. Catholic Church" in Albert Ruger's Bird's Eye View of Lansing (1866), (cf. ). This was drawn prior to the three additions, the spire, and construction of the parsonage and parochial school. This also shows the original apse at the back of the church where later additions would be made.

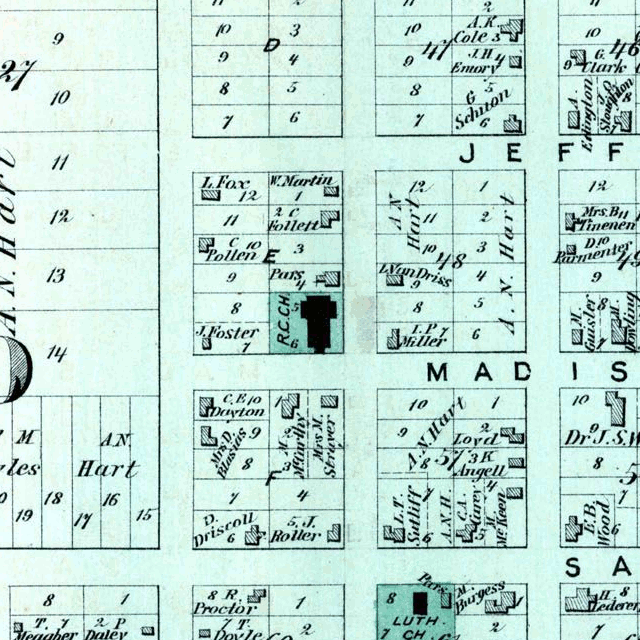
The footprint of the Saint Mary Church (E5-E6) and parsonage in 1874 (E4), after the first addition was completed. Note the wider section in the addition that would later be transformed into a transept. The church, by this time, also had two additional rooms added (1872) to serve as school rooms until a six room parochial school was built later that year (completed 1873) on parcels D4-D5. Of particular interest, note that the property directly across the street from the parsonage was owned by L. Van Driss (the pastor).

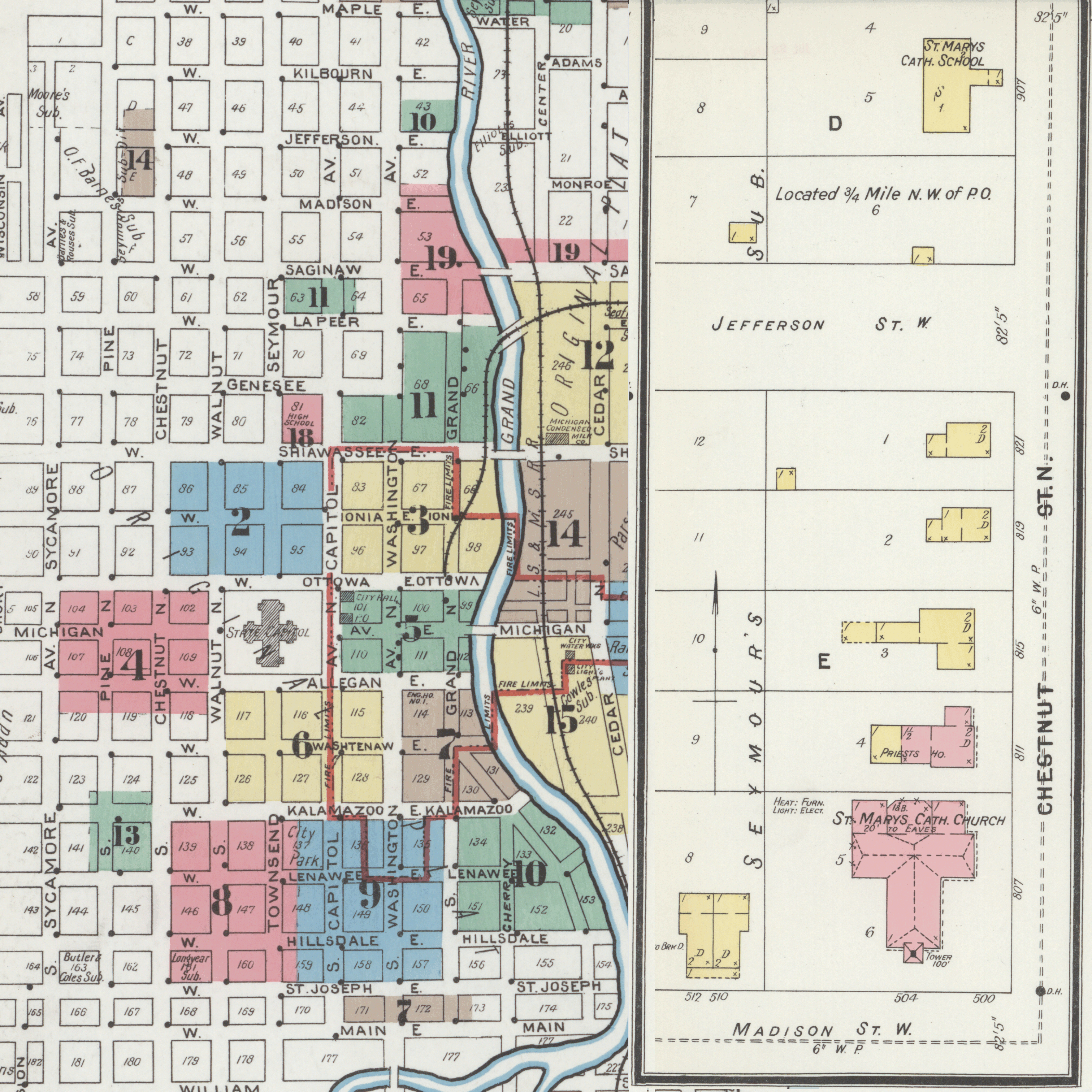
A map of the Saint Mary Church and associated buildings in 1898, after the transept was completed. Note the new structures added to the north of the transepts; these were likely one-story additions similar to those at the back of the church at St. Patrick's Parish Complex in Ann Arbor, Michigan. The parochial school (St. Mary's Catholic School, a large wooden structure) is shown one block north of the church.

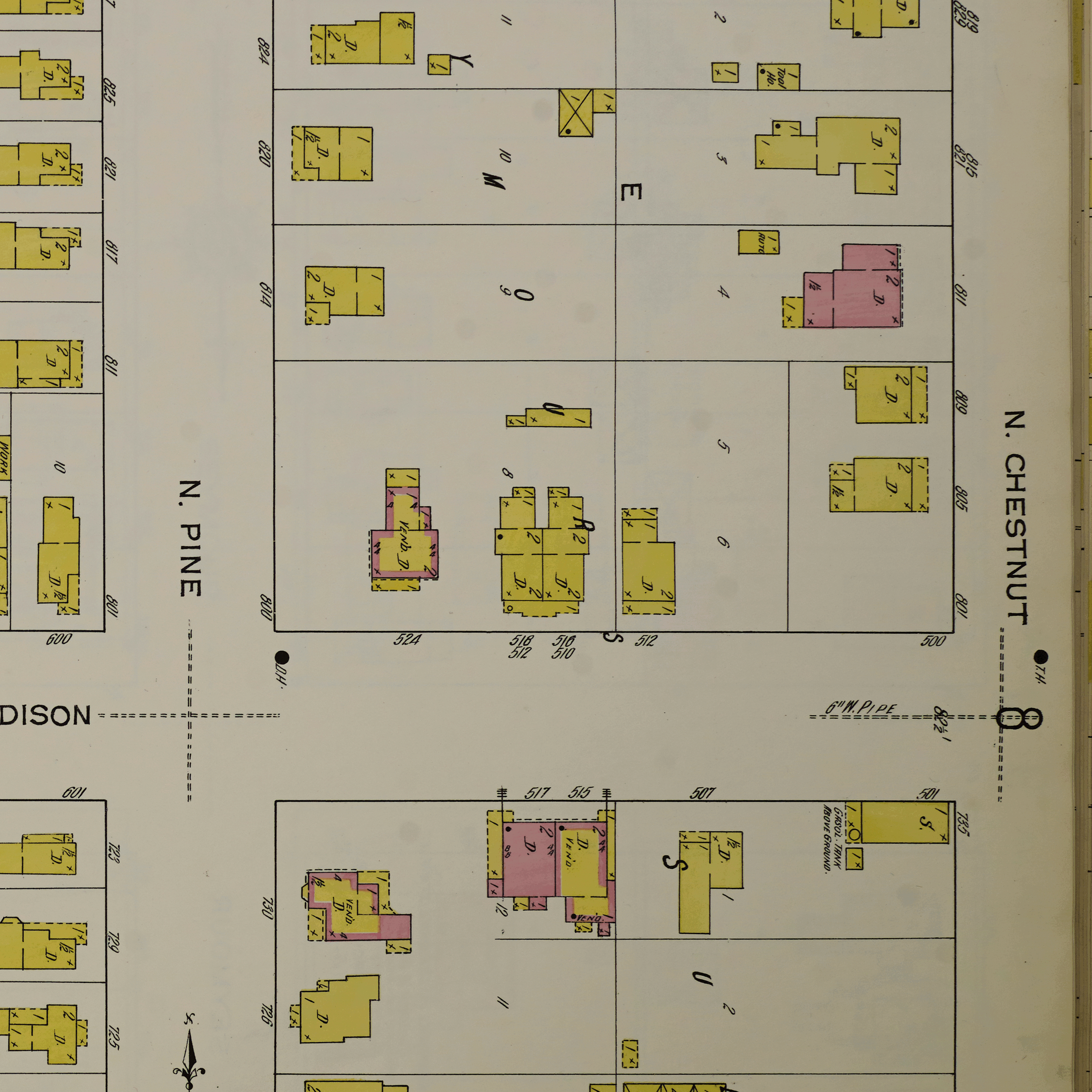
By 1913, several new homes had been built where the Saint Mary Church had stood (originally 807 N Chestnut St., but in 1906 was subdivided into 809 N Chestnut St., 805 N Chestnut St., 801 N Chestnut St., 508 W Madison St. and 512 W Madison St.). However, the original parsonage building still stands at 811 Chestnut St. The 807 N Chestnut St. address was retired after the demolition of the church.

Three Sisters of Charity came from Cincinnati, Ohio to staff the parochial school in August 1874, with Sister Octavia McKenna as Principal, who had taught the previous year in Bay City. In its first year, the school had 100 students. An addition to the west side of the parsonage (or, possibly the building directly across the street, which was owned by Reverend Van Driss) served as the first convent in Lansing from 1874 until 1909, when the sisters moved to a permanent convent on Seymour Avenue in Lansing.

Modern lighting was added after 1890 in the form of two large chandeliers in the center of the nave that used combination gas electric lighting, where the vertical chimney lamps were fueled by gas, and the downward-facing lamps held electric bulbs. This form of lighting was common in Lansing between 1890 and 1915 during the transition from gas to electric lighting.

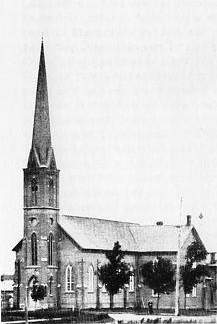
The Saint Mary Church in Lansing in a summer between 1890-1905, after electricity was run to the building.

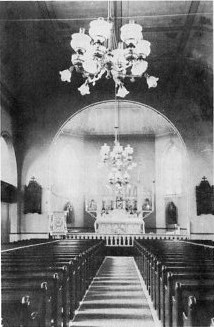
A view inside the Saint Mary Church in Lansing after combination gas-electric lighting was added. Note the balconies in the wings of the transepts, as well as the three arches in place of what had previously been load-bearing exterior walls. The plaster ceiling was decorated with a simple frieze and covered an attic or loft space.

== Contentious Years ==
Rev. Van Driss often refused to accept his salary in order to pay bills, and his personal contributions to complete the tower and steeple eventually caused a dispute. The Bishop sent a commission to Lansing to settle the dispute in 1889, and in May 1891, Rev. Van Driss took a half year sabbatical to his native Belgium. Upon returning to the United States, he took a position as chaplain to the Sisters of Charity at Mount St. Joseph, Ohio.

Father Timothy F. Slattery of Ireland was appointed pastor in Lansing after the departure of Rev. Van Driss. The new pastor soon found himself at odds with the trustees, and a group of parishioners rebelled against him, publishing an article in the local paper titled, "Set HIM Out". He found himself involved in a three year feud, culminating with a group of sixteen men carrying him out of the rectory. Although he quickly reclaimed the rectory, the feud continued until his failing health forced him to retire from the parish in 1897.

Set Him Out! Father Slattery turned out of his house. The Lansing Journal. Friday, December 20, 1895. Volume XXIV, Number 15.

== Demolition ==
The third pastor of Lansing parish, Father Lafayette Isadore Brancheau, arrived in December 1897 and soon made plans to relocate the parish to a more central location for the Catholic community, which had spread out over the decades since the first church was built. Property was purchased about half a mile south of the original church. Fr. Brancheau oversaw the construction of a larger, brick school building in 1903 on Walnut Street (one block north of the new Capitol building) at a cost of $24,000, as well as a new thirteen room parish hall that temporarily served as the church from January 1, 1904 to December 1913 while the St. Mary's Cathedral was under construction. Property for a permanent high school and convent was acquired on Seymour Avenue by 1908. The last service at the church on Chestnut Street was held on January 1, 1904, and the first service at the new parish hall on Walnut Street was held later that day. The edifice of the Saint Mary Church was razed in 1905^{Note D} and the property (including the parsonage, now referred to by locals as "The Nunnery") was sold for residential use by 1909, becoming part of Seymour's Subdivision. Most of the bricks were cleaned up and sold, with the remainder of the damaged bricks being stacked and buried at the property boundaries. After the cleanup was completed, it was rumored that the headstones of two graves of the Sisters of Charity were lost on the south side of the rectory. The graves had been slated to move to the Mount St. Joseph Sisters of Charity Motherhouse Cemetery center circle, but the consolidation was not completed until 1909. The records for that property were lost in the Cathedral of the Immaculate Conception fire of 1938.

== Notes ==
A. The dimensions of the foundation are reported as 36x50 feet by Durant 1880 and 35x50 feet by Michalek 1987 but the completed dimensions of the church were reported as 40x60 feet in the November 23, 1864 issue of the Lansing State Republican. The discrepancy could be caused by interior vs. exterior measurements, incomplete tower and/or apse, and the presence of a double brick wall, which was how the parsonage was constructed several years later.
B. The "elaborate interior decoration" may (in part) refer to the frieze on the plaster ceiling of the nave.
C. It is clear that the Lansing Journal compilation, "Yesterdays" (1930) copied the "chime" quote from Cowles 1905 but left out the word "bells". Via Michalek 1987, we know the Saint Mary Church didn't have a chime (stationary bell instrument) but rather three church bells.
D. Reported dates on the building's demolition range from 1905 (Michalek 1987) to 1906 (Capitol Area District Libraries Local History Online).
E. Rev. Fr. Timothy F. Slattery b. January 27, 1846 (Ireland) d. September 24, 1931 (Southfield, Michigan).
