= List of churches in the Diocese of Lansing =

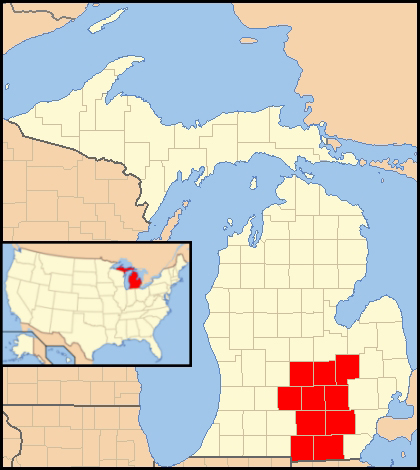
Diocese of Lansing in red

This is a list of current and former Roman Catholic churches in the Roman Catholic Diocese of Lansing. The Lansing diocese includes three of Michigan's largest cities (Lansing, Ann Arbor, and Flint) and covers 10 counties as follows: Clinton, Eaton, Genesee, Hillsdale, Ingham, Jackson, Lenawee, Livingston, Shiawassee and Washtenaw.

The cathedral church of the diocese is the Gothic Revival St. Mary Cathedral, built in 1913 in Lansing.

== Ann Arbor ==
Name	Image	Location	Description/notes
Christ the King		4000 Ave Maria Dr, Ann Arbor	Domino's Farms
St. Francis of Assisi		2250 E Stadium Blvd, Ann Arbor	
St. Mary Student Center		331 Thompson St, Ann Arbor	Groundbreaking on chapel in 1924
St. Patrick		5671 Whitmore Lake Rd, Ann Arbor	Built 1878; listed on NRHP
St. Thomas the Apostle		530 Elizabeth St, Ann Arbor	Current church dedicated 1888

== Brighton ==
Name	Image	Location	Description/notes
Holy Spirit		9565 Musch Rd, Brighton	Parish established 1979; church dedicated 1981
St. Mary Magdalen		2201 S Old US 23 Hwy, Brighton	
St. Patrick		711 Rickett Rd, Brighton	

== Clinton ==
Name	Image	Location	Description/notes
St. Jude	St.Jude-DeWitt	801 N Bridge St, DeWitt	
Most Holy Trinity	Most Holy Trinity-Fowler	545 N Maple St, Fowler	Built and initially dedicated in 1881, with its roots and local missionary history dating back to 1857
St. Joseph	St. Joseph-St. Johns	109 Linden St, St. Johns	
St. Mary		201 N Westphalia St, Westphalia	Parish established in 1836. Church dedicated in 1962.

== Flint ==
Name	Image	Location	Description/notes
Christ the King	Christ the King-Flint	1832 Seymour St, Flint	
Holy Rosary	Holy Rosary-Flint	5199 Richfield Rd, Flint	
Our Lady of Guadalupe	Our Lady of Guadalupe-Flint	2316 West Coldwater Rd, Flint	
St John Vianney	St. John Vianney-Flint	2415 Bagley St, Flint	
St. Mary	St. Mary-Flint	2500 N Franklin Ave, Flint	
St. Matthew	St. Matthew-Flint	706 Beach St, Flint	
St. Michael		609 E 5th Ave, Flint	
St. Pius X		G-3139 Hogarth Ave, Flint	Closed January 20, 2024

== Howell ==
Name	Image	Location	Description/notes
St Joseph		440 E Washington St, Howell	
St Augustine		6481 Faussett Rd, Howell	Gothic Revival church built 1895
St. John the Baptist		2099 N Hacker Rd, Howell	New church dedicated 2002
Old St John the Baptist		1991 Hacker Rd, Oceola Township	Built 1868–1873; Michigan Historic Marker L598

== Jackson ==
Name	Image	Location	Description/notes
Queen of the Miraculous Medal		606 S Wisner St, Jackson	
St. John the Evangelist		711 N Francis St, Jackson	The oldest church building in the diocese still in use; cornerstone laid 1856
St. Mary Star of the Sea		120 E Wesley St, Jackson	Byzantine Revival, Romanesque Revival church built 1923-1926

== Lansing ==
Name	Image	Location	Description/notes
Cristo Rey	Cristo Rey-Lansing	201 W Miller Rd, Lansing	Spanish-speaking parish established 1954; current church acquired 1996, opened 1998
Immaculate Heart of Mary	Immaculate Heart of Mary-Lansing	3815 S Cedar St, Lansing	
Resurrection		1505 E Michigan Ave, Lansing	Current church completed 1922
St. Casimir	St. Casimir-Lansing	815 Sparrow Ave, Lansing	Parish established 1921 to serve the area's Polish community; scheduled for permanent closure in 2020
St. Gerard	St. Gerard-Lansing	4437 W Willow Hwy, Lansing	Parish established 1958; current church completed 1975
St. Mary Cathedral		219 Seymour St, Lansing	Late Gothic Revival church built 1913; listed on NRHP
St. John the Evangelist Student Center	St.John the Evangilist-E. Lansing	327 M.A.C. Ave, East Lansing	Established as a parish in 1958
St. Thomas Aquinas		955 Alton Rd, East Lansing	Parish established 1940; current church dedicated 1968

== Other areas ==
Name	Image	Location	Description/notes
St. Joseph		415-419 Ormsby St, Adrian	Parish established 1863; church dedicated 1879; Michigan Historic Site
St. Mary of Good Counsel		305 Division St, Adrian	Romanesque Revival church built 1871; listed on NRHP
Holy Redeemer	Holy Redeemer-Burton	1227 E Bristol Rd, Burton, Michigan	
St. Mary	St. Mary-Charlotte	807 St. Marys Blvd, Charlotte	
St. Mary		14200 E Old US Hwy 12, Chelsea	
St. Rita		10516 Hayes Rd, Clarklake	
Ss. Charles & Helena		230 E Vienna St, Clio	
St. Catherine Laboure		211 Harmon St, Concord	
St. John the Evangelist	St. John the Evangelist-Davison	404 N Dayton St, Davison	
St. Alphonsus		222 Carey St, Deerfield	Danny Thomas was baptized here; now part of Light of Christ Parish
St. Joseph		3430 Dover St, Dexter	
Ss. Mary and Joseph	Ss. Mary and Joseph-Durand	700 Columbia Dr, Durand	
St. Peter	St. Peter-Eaton Rapids	515 E Knight St, Eaton Rapids	
St. John the Evangelist		600 N Adelaide St, Fenton	
St. Robert Bellarmine	St. Robert Bellarmine-Flushing	310 N Cherry St, Flushing	
St. Agnes		855 E Grand River Ave, Fowlerville	
Holy Family		11804 S Saginaw St, Grand Blanc	
St Mark the Evangelist	St. Mark the Evangelist-Grand Blanc	7296 Gale Rd, Grand Blanc	
St. Michael	St. Michael-Grand Ledge	345 Edwards St, Grand Ledge	
St. Anthony of Padua		11 N Broad St, Hillsdale	
Sacred Heart		207 S Market St, Hudson	
St. Joseph Shrine		8742 US 12, Irish Hills	Listed on NRHP
St. Isidore	St.Isodore-Laingsburg	310 Crum St. Laingsburg	
St. Mary		210 W Main St, Manchester	
St. Mary on the Lake		450 Manitou Rd, Manitou Beach	
Ss. James, Cornelius & Cyprian	Ss. James, Cornelius & Cyprian-Mason	1010 S Lansing St, Mason	
Our Lady of Fatima		913 Napoleon Rd, Michigan Center	
Immaculate Conception		420 North St, Milan	
Good Shepherd		400 N Saginaw St, Montrose	
St. Mary		509 Main St, Morrice	
St. Mary	St. Mary-Mt. Morris	11110 N Saginaw St, Mount Morris	
St. Martha	St.Martha-Okemos	1100 W. Grand River, Okemos	
St. Paul	St.Paul-Owosso	111 North Howell St, Owosso	Includes St Joseph Oratory
St. Andrew		910 Austin Dr, Saline	
St. Elizabeth		302 E. Chicago Blvd, Tecumseh	Former church; listed on NRHP
St. John the Baptist		411 Florence St, Ypsilanti	
