= Edward D. Kelly =

American prelate (1860–1926)

His Excellency, The Right Reverend Edward Denis Kelly
- Bishop of Grand Rapids; Titular Bishop of Cestrus
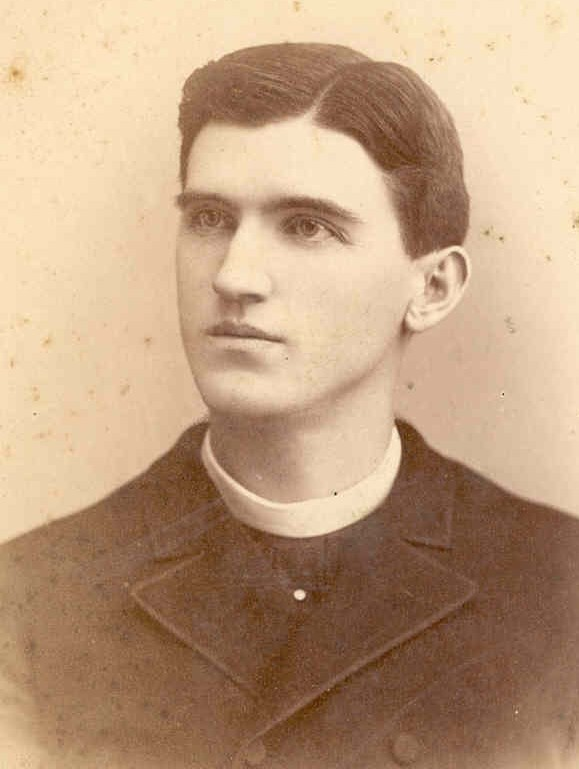
- See: Diocese of Grand Rapids
- In office: January 26, 1919; March 26, 1926
- Predecessor: Michael Gallagher
- Successor: Joseph G. Pinten
- Other posts: Auxiliary Bishop of Detroit; 1911 - 1911

Orders
- Ordination: June 16, 1886 by Caspar Borgess
- Consecration: January 26, 1910 by James Gibbons

Personal details
- Born: December 30, 1860 Hartford, Michigan, US
- Died: March 26, 1926 (aged 65) Grand Rapids, Michigan, US
- Denomination: Roman Catholic
- Education: Assumption College; St. Charles College
- Motto: Auspicio Mariae (The auspices of Mary)

Edward Denis (also Dionysius) Kelly (December 30, 1860 – March 26, 1926) was an American prelate of the Roman Catholic Church. He served as the first auxiliary bishop of the Diocese of Detroit in Michigan from 1911 to 1919, and then as the third bishop of the Diocese of Grand Rapids in Michigan from 1919 until his death in 1926.

== Biography ==
=== Early life ===
Edward Kelly was born on December 30, 1860, in Hartford, Michigan, to Thomas and Mary (née Hannon) Kelly. He attended Assumption College in Windsor, Ontario, Mount St. Mary's Seminary in Cincinnati, Ohio, and St. Charles College in Catonsville, Maryland. Kelly finished his formation for the priesthood at St. Joseph's Seminary in Troy, New York.

=== Priesthood ===
Kelly was ordained to the priesthood for the Diocese of Detroit in Windsor on June 16, 1886, by Bishop Caspar Borgess. After his ordination, Kelly was appointed as assistant pastor at St. Philip's Parish in Battle Creek, Michigan. In late 1887, he also joined the faculty of St. Francis Seminary in Monroe, Michigan; he was named as vice rector two years later. Also in 1889, he was moved to pastoral positions first at St. John's Parish in Monroe and then to St. Joseph's Parish in Dexter, Michigan.

Kelly was named as an examiner for the diocese in 1891, a post he would hold until 1919. He was also named pastor of St. Thomas the Apostle Catholic Parish in Ann Arbor, Michigan. While there, he constructed a larger church between 1896 and 1899, using the architectural firm Spier & Rohns.

=== Auxiliary Bishop of Detroit ===
On December 9, 1910, Pope Pius X appointed Kelly as the first auxiliary bishop of Detroit and as titular bishop of Cestrus. He received his episcopal consecration at St. Thomas the Apostle Church on January 26, 1910, from Cardinal James Gibbons, with Bishops Henry Richter and Camillus Maes serving as co-consecrators.

Kelly was a major contributor to the founding of Theta Phi Alpha, a national women's sorority at the University of Michigan in Ann Arbor. He also supported the Foley Guild, the Catholic student association at the university. He allowed the guild to have social events at St. Thomas Parish in Ann Arbor, although he banned tango dancing at parties there in 1914.

After the American entry into World War I in 1917, Kelly served on the Michigan Library War Council, an organization that provided reading material to soldiers from Michigan. In 1918, he was appointed superintendent of the diocesan schools. In 1920, Kelly and the other bishops in Michigan defeated a proposed amendment by nativist groups to the Michigan State Constitution that would have required all children between ages five and 16 to attend public schools.

=== Bishop of Grand Rapids ===
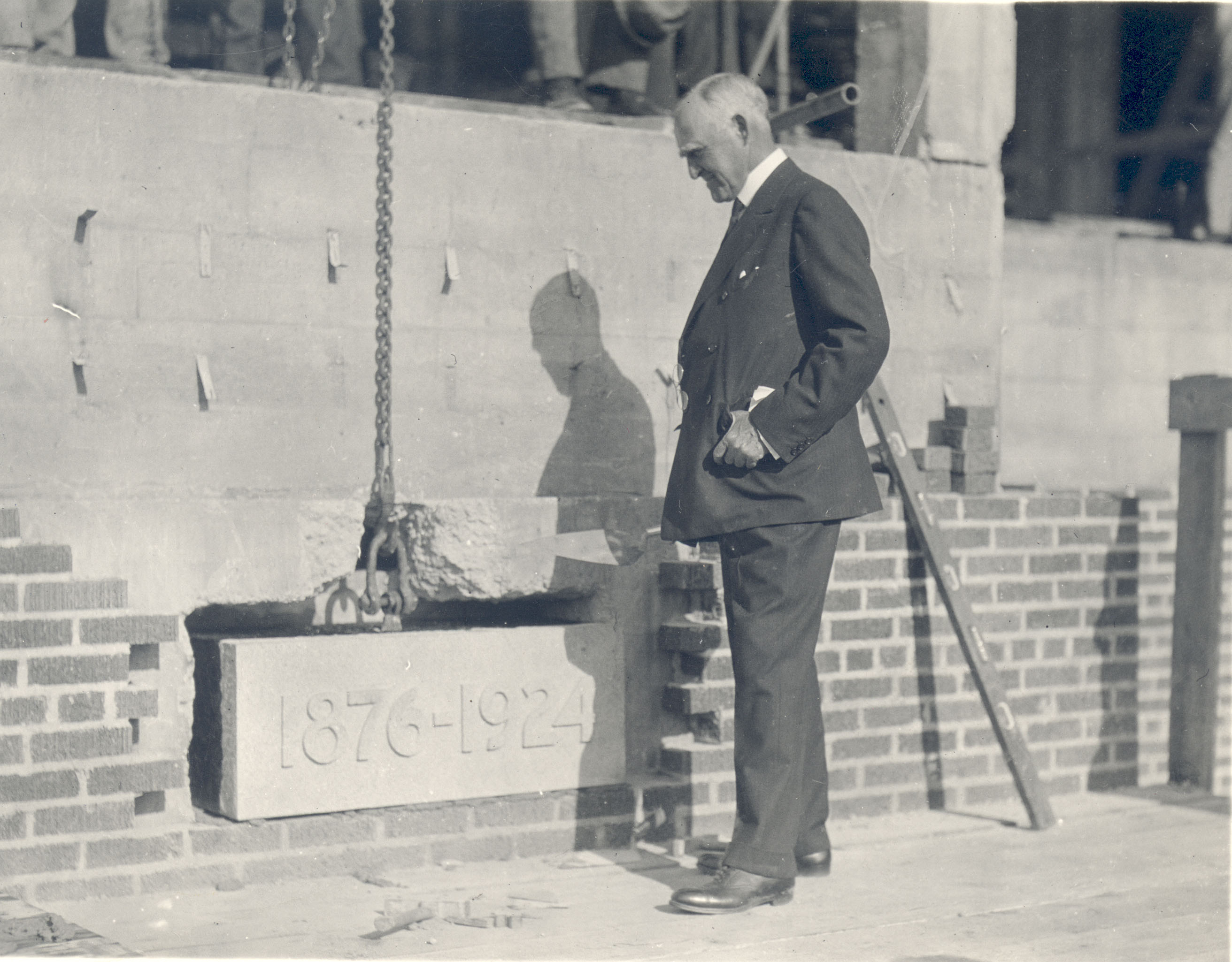
Kelly in 1924, laying the cornerstone for the new Butterworth Hospital

On January 16, 1919, Pope Benedict XV named Kelly as the third bishop of Grand Rapids; he was installed on May 20, 1919. Edward Kelly died on March 26, 1926, at the episcopal residence in Grand Rapids, Michigan, from a hemorrhage or embolism. He was age 65.

Catholic Church titles
Preceded by Michael Gallagher	Bishop of Grand Rapids; 1919–1926	Succeeded by Joseph G. Pinten
