= St. Thomas the Apostle Catholic Church (Ann Arbor, Michigan) =

Parish in Michigan, United States

St. Thomas the Apostle Church
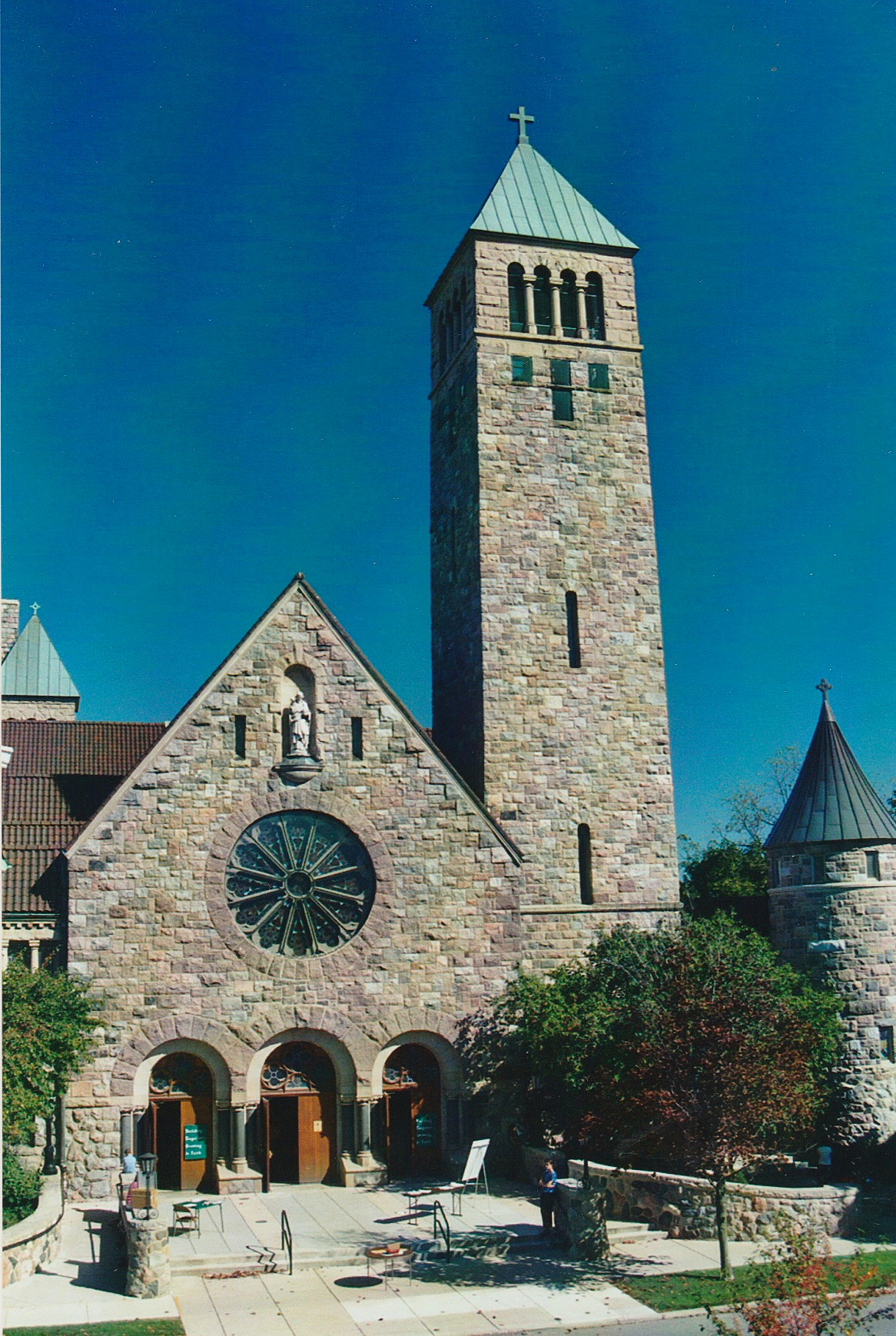
- St. Thomas Church, c. 2005
- Interactive map of the St. Thomas the Apostle Church area
- Etymology: Named after St. Thomas

Record height
- Tallest in Ann Arbor, Michigan from 1905 to 1936^{[I]}
- Preceded by: Medical College building
- Surpassed by: Burton Memorial Tower

General information
- Architectural style: Romanesque
- Location: Ann Arbor, Michigan
- Coordinates: 42°17′06.2″N 83°44′29.0″W
- Construction started: 1897
- Inaugurated: 1899
- Cost: $75,000 (1899 dollars)

Height
- Height: 125 feet (38 m)

St. Thomas the Apostle Catholic Church is a parish of the Roman Catholic Church located in Ann Arbor, Michigan at 530-540 Elizabeth Street. Its historic parish church is listed as a Michigan State Historic Site.

== History ==
In 1831, Fr. Patrick O'Kelly arrived to minister to Irish settlers in the Washtenaw area. The first Mass in Ann Arbor was said in a private home on July 12, 1835, and efforts began that year to erect a permanent church. His successor, Fr. Thomas Cullen, purchased land on East Kingsley Street near Division Street in 1842, and the first church was built on this land—the first brick church in Ann Arbor. It was not dedicated until 1845, as Bishop Lefevre did not dedicate churches until they were free of debt.

The church cemetery, on North Main Street, was acquired in 1843, but not consecrated until 1878. In 1868, the parish acquired a former public school down the street and opened its parochial school, St. Thomas the Apostle School, which celebrated its sesquicentennial in 2018.

Fr. Edward D. Kelly became pastor in 1891, and found the existing church inadequate to the needs of the parish. He began raising funds in 1896 for the current church, which was dedicated in 1899 and completed in 1905. The yellow brick rectory was completed in 1902, and a convent for the Sisters of the Immaculate Heart of Mary on Elizabeth Street in 1911. Over the years, the parish sponsored the first hospital in Ann Arbor as well as two other Catholic parishes.

In 1977, grades 9 through 12 were separated from St. Thomas the Apostle School and became Father Gabriel Richard Catholic High School, an independent institution. which moved to a new campus in 2003.

== Architecture ==
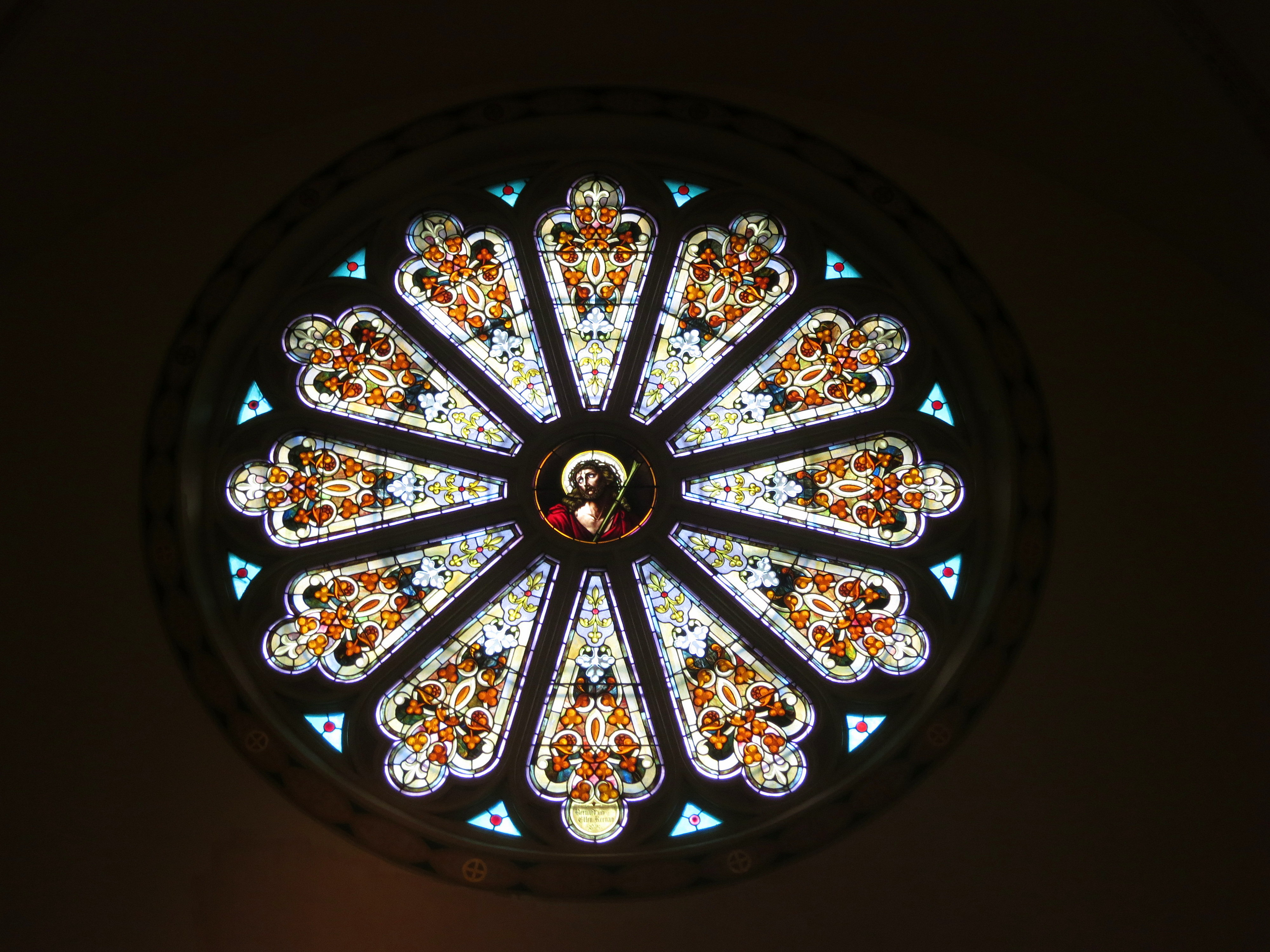
Saint Thomas the Apostle Church (Ann Arbor, Michigan) - interior, rose window, Christ

Fr. Edward D. Kelly hired the Detroit architectural firm of Spier & Rohns for the new church, which was designed in the Richardsonian Romanesque style. The cornerstone was placed in 1897, and the church was dedicated in 1899.

The building is built of local fine grain rough cut granite, on a cruciform plan. It seats a thousand people.

In 1927 Fr. Command, then pastor, traveled to the Vatican. In the course of that trip he visited Padua and ordered a statue of St. Thomas that was delivered and placed in a niche high in the gable four years later.
