= Caspar Henry Borgess =

German-born American prelate

- Bishop Emeritus of Detroit
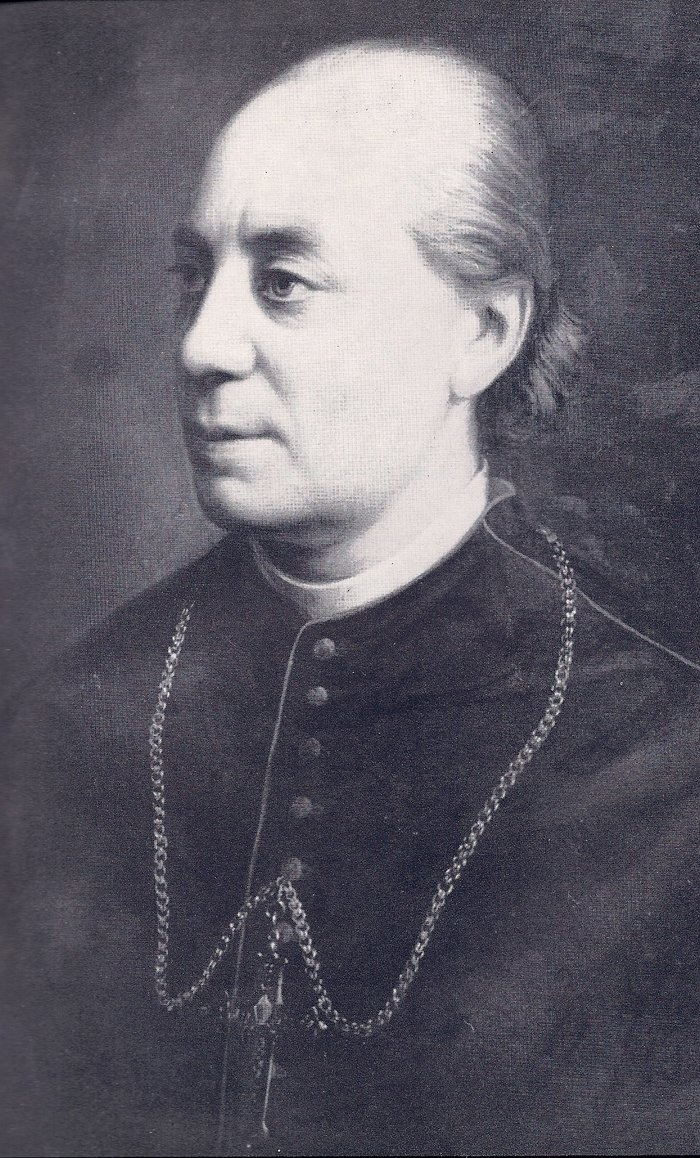
- Church: Catholic Church
- Diocese: Diocese of Detroit
- Appointed: December 30, 1871
- Term ended: April 16, 1887
- Predecessor: Frederick Rese
- Successor: John Samuel Foley
- Other posts: Titular Bishop of Phacusa (1888-1890); Coadjutor Bishop of Detroit (1870-1871); Titular Bishop of Calydon (1870-1871)

Orders
- Ordination: December 8, 1848 by Richard Vincent Whelan
- Consecration: April 24, 1870 by Sylvester Horton Rosecrans

Personal details
- Born: August 1, 1826 Addrup, Germany
- Died: May 3, 1890 (aged 63) Kalamazoo, Michigan

Caspar Henry Borgess (August 1, 1826 – May 3, 1890) was a German-born American prelate of the Catholic Church. He was the second Bishop of Detroit, serving from 1871 to 1887.

== Biography ==
=== Early life ===
Borgess was born on August 1, 1826, in the village of Addrup, part of Essen in the Grand Duchy of Oldenburg (present-day Lower Saxony). He was the son of John Gerhard Borgess and Maria Anna Dinkgreve. He came to the United States with his family in 1839. They first resided in Philadelphia, where Caspar's uncle, Rev. Otto Henry Borgess, was pastor of Holy Trinity Church (1838–1845). The family finally settled in Cincinnati, where he attended St. Xavier College.

=== Priesthood ===
Borgess, who wrote that he "felt considerable interest in the many wonders so frequently rehearsed by" his uncle Otto, studied for the priesthood at Mount St. Mary's Seminary of the West. He was ordained a priest on December 8, 1847, by Bishop Richard Vincent Whelan. His first assignment was as pastor of Holy Cross Church, the oldest church in Columbus. At the beginning of his decade-long tenure at Holy Cross, he became known for caring for the sick during the cholera epidemic of 1849.

In 1859 he was named rector of the Cathedral of St. Peter in Cincinnati. In addition to his pastoral duties, he became chancellor of the Archdiocese in 1860.

=== Bishop ===
On February 8, 1870, Borgess was appointed by Pope Pius IX to be coadjutor bishop of the Diocese of Detroit, Michigan, and titular bishop of Calydon. As coadjutor, he succeeded the late Peter Paul Lefevere, who led the diocese for nearly 30 years while Bishop Frederick Rese was incapacitated. Rese, a fellow German who had been vicar general of Cincinnati before his appointment like Borgess, resided in Europe but had not resigned.

Borgess received his episcopal consecration on April 24, 1870, from Bishop Sylvester Horton Rosecrans, with Bishops John Luers and Patrick Feehan serving as co-consecrators, at the cathedral at Cincinnati. When Rese died on December 30, 1871, Borgess automatically assumed the title of Bishop of Detroit.

During his tenure, Borgess earned a reputation as a stern disciplinarian who emphasized his authority. He refused to repay a man in Kalamazoo who mortgaged his farm to pay for the construction of St. Augustine's Church; when the man sued Borgess, the bishop threatened to excommunicate him. He even suspended a priest who published a letter about the St. Augustine's affair. In 1877 the Vatican reinstated a priest whom Borgess had transferred from Marshall to Traverse City over financial reports. He suspended the controversial pastor of St. Albertus Church in Detroit in 1885, and placed the church under interdict when the congregation refused to accept their new pastor.

These controversies and his poor relationships with his own priests led Borgess to first submit his resignation in 1879. However, the Vatican declined and he remained in office for another eight years. He submitted his resignation again on April 16, 1887, and this time it was accepted by Rome. In his retirement, he was given the titular see of Phacusa on August 14, 1888.

By the end of his tenure as bishop, Borgess had increased the diocese's Catholic population from 90,000 to 120,000, the number of churches from 56 to 90, and the number of priests from 69 to 99. He invited the Jesuits, under whom he studied in Cincinnati, to establish the University of Detroit in 1877. He successfully petitioned the Vatican for a division of his diocese, leading to the erection of the Diocese of Grand Rapids in 1882.

Borgess died in Kalamazoo on May 3, 1890, at age 63. He was buried in the churchyard of St. Augustine's Church but his remains were later moved to Nazareth College in 1906 and again to Holy Sepulchre Cemetery in 1939.

Catholic Church titles
Preceded by Frederick Rese	Bishop of Detroit; 1871–1888	Succeeded by John Samuel Foley
