= Frederick Rese =

German-born American bishop (1791-1871)

The Most Reverend Frederic John Conrad Résé
- Bishop of Detroit
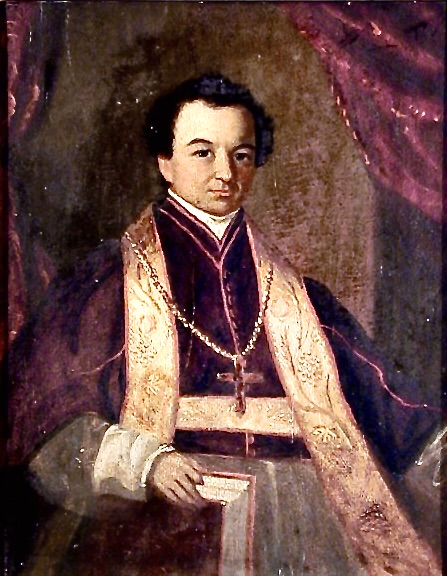
- See: Detroit
- Installed: March 23, 1833
- Term ended: December 27, 1871
- Predecessor: Diocese erected
- Successor: Caspar Henry Borgess
- Other post: Vicar general of Cincinnati

Orders
- Ordination: March 15, 1823 by Placido Zurla
- Consecration: October 6, 1833 by Joseph Rosati

Personal details
- Born: February 6, 1791 Vienenburg, Hanover
- Died: December 27, 1871 (aged 80) Hildesheim, Hanover, Germany

Styles of Frederic John Conrad Résé
- Reference style: The Most Reverend
- Spoken style: Your Excellency
- Religious style: Bishop
- Posthumous style: not applicable

Frederick Rese (or Résé) (February 6, 1791 – December 29, 1871) was a German-born American Roman Catholic bishop who served as the first Catholic bishop of the Diocese of Detroit from 1833 until his death.

== Life ==
Rese was born in Vienenburg, a small town in the German Electorate of Hanover. Orphaned at a young age, he grew up in poverty. He was apprenticed to a tailor and worked as a journeyman before joining the Hanoverian cavalry in 1813 to fight against Napoleon in the German Campaign and took part in the 1815 Battle of Waterloo under command of Field Marshal Blücher.

After the Napoleonic Wars, Rese adopted a clerical career. He went to Rome with the impression that his lack of education might be balanced by a willingness to work in foreign missions. He received Holy Orders from Cardinal Vicar Placido Zurla on 15 March 1823. Rese served in the Congregation for the Evangelization of Peoples and in 1824 met with Edward Fenwick, first Bishop of Cincinnati, who had travelled to Rome to ask Pope Leo XII for support. The Pope engaged Rese to assist him; once arrived in the United States, he became vicar general of the Cincinnati diocese, which included Detroit. In 1828 he was sent to Europe to gain support for the Catholic missions in the U.S. He visited the Austrian capital Vienna, where he helped to found the missionary Leopoldine Society, as well as Munich and Regensburg in Bavaria, Belgium and other parts of Europe until 1831, convincing many to immigrate to the U.S. and found Catholic communities.

== Detroit ==
On March 8, 1833, Father Rese was named to be the first bishop of Detroit with a papal bull in which Pope Gregory XVI declared as he erected the Diocese of Detroit. Father Rese would be the first German-born bishop in the United States. Ten months elapsed, however, before Detroit welcomed its own bishop. Father Rese desired to be consecrated by Bishop Joseph Rosati of St. Louis, and he deferred the event until Bishop Rosati should pass through Cincinnati on his way to the Second Provincial Council of Baltimore. The consecration took place on October 6, 1833, in the cathedral at Cincinnati. Following the ceremony, the two bishops set out to attend the deliberations at the council. They returned to Cincinnati at the end of November, and Bishop Rese tarried there, winding up affairs, until the end of the year. On January 7, 1834, Bishop Rese made his entry into Detroit to take possession of his see at Ste. Anne Cathedral.

The parish of Most Holy Trinity was established by 1835. German immigrants established a small settlement named Connor's Creek and built a log church which they called Kirchen Wald (Church in the Woods) and where Redemptionists missionaries offered services. The name was later changed to "Chapel of the Assumption" and later "St. Mary's in the Woods" before being designated the Assumption of the Blessed Virgin Mary Church.

In 1838 he again travelled to Europe, where in Munich he reconciled the establishment of a Bavarian missionary association (Ludwig-Missionsverein) with King Louis I.

About 1840 Rese became demented; uncapable to fulfil his office, he was recalled to Rome. He finally retired to a nursery home of the Daughters of Charity of Saint Vincent de Paul in Hildesheim. In accordance with the practice of the time, he remained nominally the Bishop of Detroit for another 30 years until his death in 1871, his diocese administrated by coadjutor bishops (in primis Peter Paul Lefevere from 1841 until his death in 1869). He was succeeded by his compatriot Caspar Henry Borgess.
