= Four Sisters of Charity =

American educators

The Four Sisters of Charity were four American educators known as Sisters Loyola Ritchie, Rebecca Delone, Felicia Fenwick, and Rosaline Brown. Catholic Bishop of Detroit, Michigan, Peter Paul Lefevere saw a need for education and charitable work in Detroit in the late 1830s; the four women were sent there in 1844.

The four women rebuilt Detroit's school system, educating 600 children in schools founded in 1844 and 1859. The first school was opened within two weeks of their arrival.

In 1845, they founded St. Vincent's Hospital at Sister Delone's suggestion, the first hospital in Michigan and the Northwest Territory. The hospital's first patient, Robert Bridgeman, went on to work as an orderly there helping other patients. A second hospital, St. Mary's, was constructed in 1850, and the following year the first outpatient clinic in Michigan, and the second in the nation. They also created the Michigan State Retreat for the Insane, the first private psychiatric hospital in Michigan, and The House of Providence, a home for unwed mothers and their children. They were inducted into the Michigan Women's Hall of Fame in 1997.
