= Bernard Kroger =

American businessman (1860–1938)

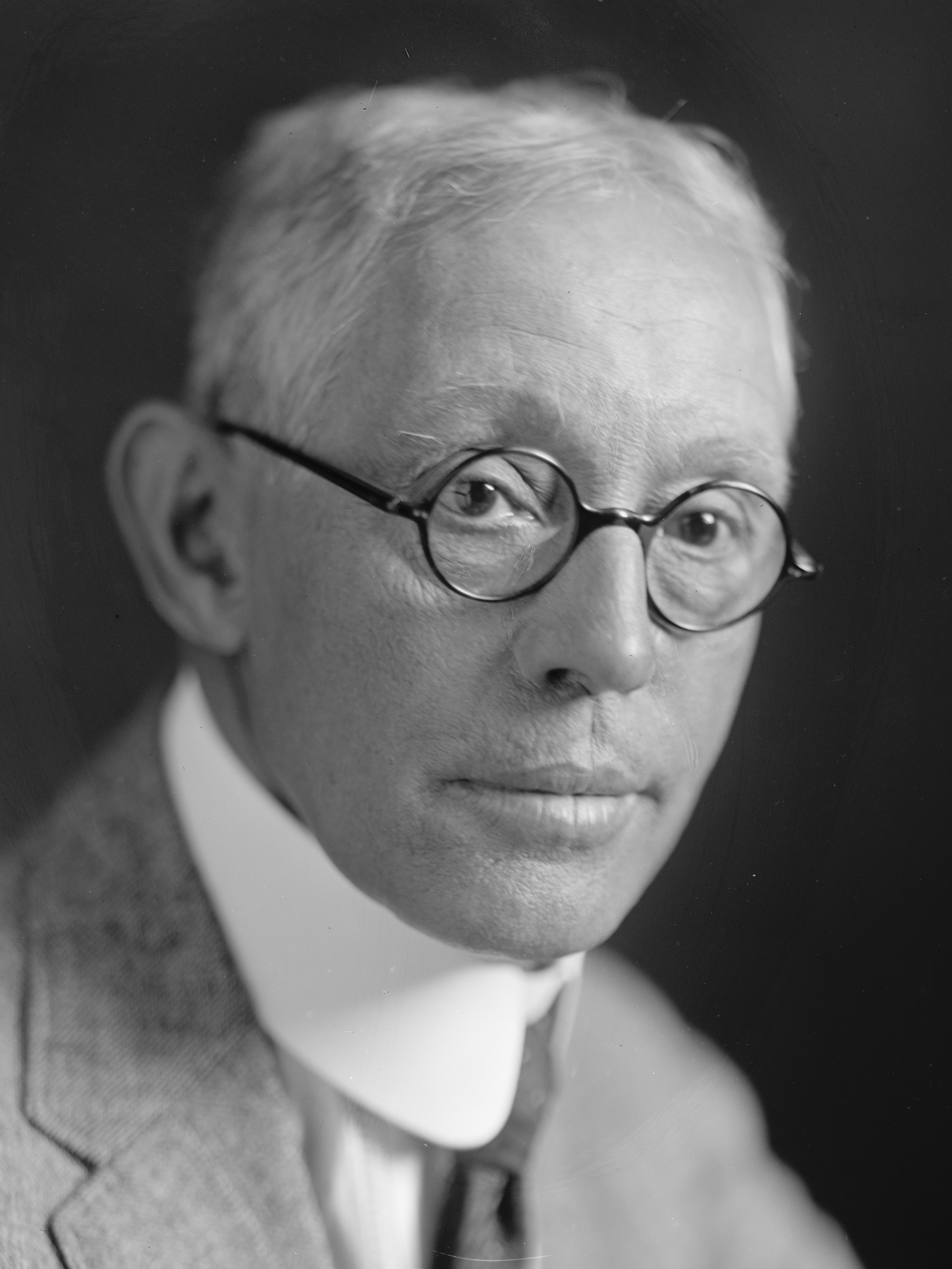
- Kroger, c. 1915–1925
- Born: Bernard Heinrich Kroger; January 24, 1860; Cincinnati, Ohio, U.S.
- Died: July 21, 1938 (aged 78); Cape Cod, Massachusetts, U.S.
- Resting place: Spring Grove Cemetery, Cincinnati; 39°09′52″N 84°31′22″W
- Occupations: Grocer, entrepreneur, banker, philanthropist
- Known for: Kroger

Bernard Heinrich "Henry" Kroger (January 24, 1860 – July 21, 1938) was an American businessman who created the Kroger chain of supermarkets. Kroger was a pioneering grocery innovator who introduced self-service shopping to the public in 1895. He allowed customers to enter his stores, shop with prices clearly marked on every item, and take the merchandise home themselves instead of waiting for a delivery.

Kroger pioneered in-store bakeries and in-store fresh meat butchery. Kroger grocery stores were the first in the country to sell freshly baked goods, meat, and groceries under the same roof.

Kroger was known for his philanthropy and donated to parks, hospitals, and medical research.

== Early life ==
Kroger was born in Cincinnati, Ohio, the fifth of ten children of German immigrants Johan Heinrich and Mary Gertrude (née Schlebbe) Kroger. Kroger's mother was born in Elve, Westphalia. His father John Henry came from Lüsche in the Grand Duchy of Oldenburg (today a part of Bakum) and was born in nearby Addrup. Kroger's family lived above the dry goods store his parents owned. Due to the 1873 economic downturn, they had to close the failing store.

Kroger quit school and went to work at age thirteen to help support his family. He quit his first job in a drug store because his Christian mother objected to him working on Sundays. He then worked as a farmhand near Pleasant Plain, Ohio, for six dollars a month (equivalent to 170 dollars a month in 2025). Kroger said of the farm work, "I shall never forget that first night I spent away from home. ... Although I was but fourteen and weighed only one hundred pounds, my job on the farm was that of any man". Kroger hated his employer. He eventually contracted malaria, quit the job, and walked the 37 miles back to Cincinnati.

== Grocery career ==
Kroger then began working as a door-to-door salesman for the Great Northern and Pacific Tea Co., eventually ending up at the Imperial Tea Co. The grocery was not doing well, and the two owners made Kroger a manager. Kroger turned the failing grocery around, earning the store a $3,100 profit (equivalent to $100,000 in 2025). By 1885, the company had four stores and this expanded to 30 in 1900. When the owners later refused to make Kroger a partner, he invested his life savings of $372 with a friend, Irish immigrant B.A. Branagan, who had borrowed $350 (in total equivalent to $23,300 in 2025). Together they opened a grocery store at 66 Pearl Street in downtown Cincinnati. The unexpected overnight flood of 1884 ruined the store and the partners opened another.

Kroger advertised the partnership stores as "B.H. Kroger & Co., proprietors of The Great Western Tea Co". The stores succeeded despite numerous growing pains. In 1901, he added a bakery, combining what had previously been two separate businesses, allowing the company to sell bread at cost. Other companies would later emulate this new diversification strategy. Wanting greater control over his efforts, Kroger asked partner Branagan to buy his share in the partnership for $1,000. Branagan couldn't afford the offer and agreed to sell his share to Kroger for $1,500. Kroger soon opened four new locations within Cincinnati.

=== Grocery innovator ===
Kroger is credited with the creation of the successful low-cost, self-service grocery chain model that persists today. Kroger's innovations include creating the first grocery to mark the sale price on every individual item and starting the practice of giving a premium to every customer who bought coffee or tea. In 1902, Kroger advertised his "profit-sharing" system, where his customers were given "proofs of purchase" (receipts). After collecting them, customers could exchange the receipts for "crockery ware, glass, granite, tin and enameled ware, rugs, furniture, lamps and hundreds of other useful and ornamental articles".

In 1912, Kroger was the first grocer to use automobiles as delivery vehicles. Kroger purchased a fleet of 75 Ford Model Ts, replacing 200 horses and delivery wagons in Cincinnati. Kroger pioneered combining grocery stores with a bakery and later added formerly stand-alone meat markets to his retail grocery store concept.

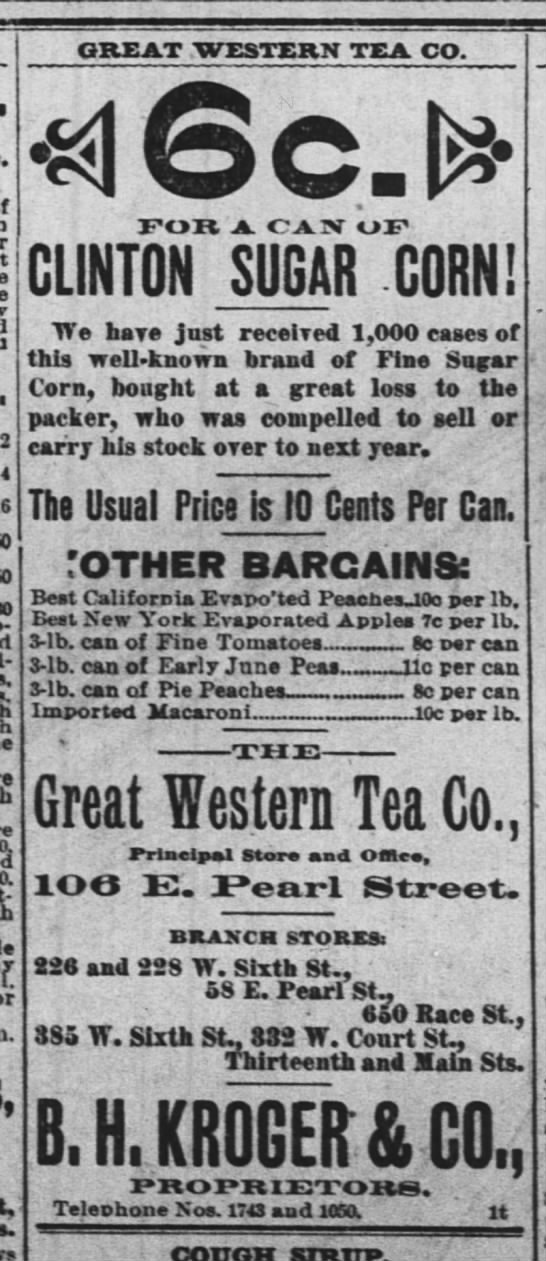
Early B. H. Kroger & Co. newspaper ad

=== Advertising key to successful growth ===
Kroger was one of the first grocers to advertise in newspapers and advertised extensively in local papers as early as 1895, which he felt led to his success. Kroger's innovative ads featured extensive lists of items for sale by categories and always included "money-saving prices" as well as descriptions of the articles being offered. By 1897, Kroger’s advertisements appeared regularly in Cincinnati’s numerous newspapers and often filled entire pages, a marketing effort unknown up to that point.

=== Controlled cost and quality ===
Seeking to control the cost and quality of the goods he sold, Kroger sought economies of scale through purchasing as well as manufacturing his own private label products. Kroger always paid suppliers cash for their products and gained price advantage by buying products in bulk. Kroger pioneered private label manufacturing, producing many items himself. Private-label products allowed Kroger to take market share from national food brands. At one point, private labels held more than 25 percent market share in terms of sales.

By 1902, he had a factory producing his own brands of preserved foods, jellies and extracts. The new factory was designed with enough space to also accommodate moving the existing Kroger cracker production inside the new building located at Pendleton and Hunt streets in Cincinnati. Kroger was the first grocer with an internal quality control lab founded in 1921 and the first to introduce scientific consumer research.

=== Price sensitivity–related marketing ===
Kroger was adept in using the public's sensitivity to price in marketing the goods offered in his stores. In 1902, coal prices rose dramatically, but Kroger did not raise prices, saying "We produce about 100,000 loaves (of bread) a week and consume between eight and ten tons of coal. Even with coal selling at double cost to us per loaf would be inconsiderable... but at present I see no reason for charging our customers more than they are now paying".

=== Expanded market reach ===
Kroger continuously expanded his market area, reaching into Kentucky with new locations in the 1890s. In 1902, Kroger continued his acquisition program, buying 15 Dayton, Ohio, grocery stores from the Cincinnati Grocery Co. Kroger stores appeared in Missouri in 1912 and Indiana in 1924. Kroger expanded to a peak of 5,575 stores in 1929.

=== Pioneered shorter retail grocery store hours ===
In 1899 Kroger called for all other retail grocery stores to join his effort to limit retail grocery store hours by closing at 7:00 p.m. Saying he recognized "the right of working people to have their evenings to themselves", he set the 7:00 p.m. closing time to accommodate those whose work ended at 6:00 p.m. so that "they have a chance to get their groceries" in the remaining hour.

=== Million-dollar incorporation ===
By 1904 Kroger's success allowed him to incorporate his company through a $1,000,000 stock sale (equivalent to $36 million in 2025). He offered 4,000 preferred shares at $110 per share to public investors with a guaranteed 5.45% interest to be paid quarterly. He retained the remaining 6,000 shares for himself and advertised that those shares would never be sold. The stock prospectus said of Kroger's business, "This company takes over the entire business of B. H. Kroger, which has been immensely profitable. ... The enormous retail grocery business operated through 40 stores, the cracker and cake bakery ... the bread bakery ... the coffee roasting plant and the wholesale store and warehouse". The million dollar stock offering was oversubscribed with $1,067,000 invested by 215 new stockholders.

Kroger renamed the company Kroger Grocery & Baking Co. Later the company's name was shortened to Kroger.

=== Pioneered in-grocery store butcher departments ===
Kroger was the first to include fresh meat inside US grocery stores. In 1904, Kroger acquired the Shapell, Nagel & Co. meat packing company. The purchase gave Kroger 11 additional grocery stores and stands as well as meat slaughtering, butchering and refrigeration operations that covered "several acres" in Camp Washington, a suburb of Cincinnati. Kroger's novel idea of including a convenient fresh meat department in his grocery stores drove consumer demand. By only offering certain cuts of meat on certain days of the week, Kroger was able to build and fine-tune customer traffic. For example, advertising in 1905 said, "On Saturday only, we will sell ... loin steaks ... chuck roasts ... and sugar-cured, smoked [ham] shoulders".

=== Promoted telephone orders ===
By 1905 Kroger offered customers the ability to call their nearest Kroger grocery store and place orders that would be "filled as carefully as though given in person". Kroger advertising told homeowners that if they provided their phone number they would "take pleasure in calling [them] up every morning for [their] order".

=== $2.5 million capitalization ===
In 1908 Kroger purchased the Great China Tea Company and the Schneider Grocery and Baking Company. He initiated another round of capital expansion, valuing the company at $2.5 million (equivalent to $90 million in 2025). Kroger offered the public 6,000 shares at a $100 per share price with a guaranteed 7% interest to be paid quarterly. The shares were said to be "liens, dollar for dollar, against actual inventory assets". It was said that the Kroger Grocery & Baking Co. was "absolutely free from debt of any description" and that the company paid "cash for everything it buys and sells for cash only". In the four years since the first stock offering, Kroger had added 96 stores for a total of 136 locations and boasted the company's "warehouse, bakery, preserving and candy factory ... was the largest of its kind in the United States".

=== Sold the grocery chain ===
By the end of the 1920s, Kroger had acquired and opened over 5,500 stores. Kroger sold the company in December 1927 for $28 million (equivalent to $520 million in 2025) to a Wall Street banking syndicate headed by Lehman Brothers. He resigned as president of the Kroger Co. on January 31, 1928. Kroger resigned from the company's board of directors in 1931.

== Banking entrepreneur ==
In 1900, Kroger invested in the creation of Provident Savings Bank and the Provident Trust Company. He was elected president of the bank in 1904.

In typical fashion, Kroger set about to grow the assets of the bank. In 1910, Provident acquired the assets of the Queen City Savings Bank and Trust Company, increasing Provident's deposits by 30% to a total of $6,440,000 (equivalent to $220 million in 2025). In 1911, Provident acquired the assets of the Cincinnati Trust Company, depriving former director George B. Cox control over that bank's financial clout.

He sold his holdings in the bank in 1928, shortly before the Wall Street Crash of 1929. During a bank crisis in 1933, he converted $15 million (equivalent to $370 million in 2025) of his savings into cash and displayed it at the bank to demonstrate the financial soundness of the bank, averting the crisis locally. Kroger was chairman of the board of the bank at the time of his death.

Kroger was appointed a director of the Cincinnati branch of the Federal Reserve Bank of Cleveland and worked in that capacity until 1936. He also was president and a director of the First Bank of Palm Beach (Florida).

== Transportation entrepreneur ==
Seeking to profit from inter-urban transportation, Kroger purchased the unused franchises of the Cincinnati, Milford & Goshen, a proposed Cincinnati inter-urban commuter rail line. By 1903, Kroger was the president of the renamed Cincinnati, Milford and Loveland Traction Company, known as "The Milford Line". Kroger built the 17-mile inter-urban electric commuter railroad and roadway between Cincinnati's Erie Avenue near Red Bank Road and the west side of Milford.

Service started March 28, 1904. Riders referred to the rail line as the "Kroger Line" or the "Blue Line", because of the car's royal blue paint scheme. The cars were praised by local newspapers for the comfortable electric heating and "gentlemanly conductors". The line offered riders separate smoking compartments. Later that year, the railroad was granted permission to extend its line to Madisonville, a Cincinnati suburb. Kroger then extended the line from the center of Cincinnati to Blanchester, Ohio. Reorganization came in 1918 with a renaming of the company to the Cincinnati, Milford & Blanchester Traction Company.

A series of problems, including erratic service due to expensive (said then to be 60% of a rider's fare) and unpredictable electricity service, aging and failing cars that caused crashes which included fatalities and an inability to expand the service area caused income to fall precipitously. In 1919 the Union Savings Bank and Trust Co. foreclosed. Kroger’s Cincinnati, Milford & Blanchester line was bankrupt. The Ohio Public Utilities Commission gave the company permission to abandon service. The last car ran on December 31, 1919.

== Ohio gubernatorial candidate ==
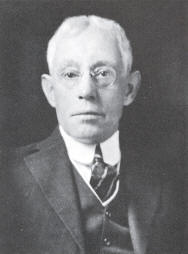
Kroger, c. 1900–1920

On June 29, 1912, four days before the Ohio Republican Party nominating convention, a group of 25 Cincinnati businessmen presented a petition signed by 1,100 area businessmen to the Hamilton County (Ohio) Republican committee, asking them to support Kroger's nomination as the Republican candidate in the upcoming Ohio gubernatorial election. News articles said the county committee promoted Kroger as a candidate because he "was a clean man... it was time for a business man to conduct the business affairs of the state". The Hamilton County Republican committee agreed and started a grassroots campaign to nominate Kroger as the party's gubernatorial candidate. Hamilton County Election Chairman Al Morrill petitioned Ohio Senator Theodore E. Burton to support Kroger's nomination, saying, "Hamilton County will vote for Kroger first, last and all the time".

Kroger said if nominated, he would accept and make the bid for governor because "the conditions in the state of Ohio are ripe for a business administration of its affairs".

Kroger lost the nomination at the convention. There were four candidates including Kroger. Voting on four ballots showed no clear majority winner. Then former Ohio lieutenant governor Warren G. Harding nominated dark horse candidate Judge Edmond B. Dillon from the convention floor. A vote was taken and Dillon won nomination with the fifth election.

== Charitable efforts ==
Kroger was also involved in many charitable ventures, including the opening of parks, donations to zoos, and medical research. His charitable interests included the Charles Fleischmann Endowment Fund, the Cincinnati Institute of Fine Arts, the Cincinnati Bureau of Governmental Research, the Community Chest, and the Council of Social Agencies. Cincinnati Post columnist Al Segal said Kroger said to him, "You meet a great many people who need help. If I can be of service, let me know".

=== Support for the blind ===
On December 7. 1911 Kroger was elected president of the Cincinnati Welfare Association of the Blind during an organizational meeting held at the St. Nicholas Hotel. Kroger was joined by fellow Cincinnati philanthropist Harry M. Levy. The two men each pledged $1,000 (equivalent to $70,000 in 2025) per year. Kroger immediately funded a factory where blind adults could produce brooms and mops which Kroger sold in his stores, passing all of the sales proceeds to the Welfare Association. In 1915, the Cincinnati Board of Health assumed the project, saying, "It was not considered just that two public-spirited citizens should be called upon to that which the municipality should do for itself".

=== Tuberculosis and anemia relief ===
Kroger was a benefactor in the Cincinnati area fight against childhood tuberculosis and anemia. A major fund raiser for the Cincinnati Anti-Tuberculosis League, he helped fund the Kroger Hills Camp for Anemic Children. Located on a 92-acre tract along US 50 between Mariemont and Terrace Park in the Cincinnati area, the camp allowed area children afflicted by tuberculosis and anemia to benefit from fresh air, exercise and medical treatment. In 1916 Kroger offered to spearhead fundraising to double the capacity of the camp. In 1922 the camp treated nearly 500 children who spent from one to ten weeks there during the summer.

=== Community ===
Kroger donated five tigers for the Cincinnati Zoo's new Tiger Grotto in 1934. It was one of the first "barless" exhibits at the zoo.

=== Wide-ranging philanthropic efforts ===
Kroger's philanthropy was not limited to the Cincinnati area. The Hyden Hospital and Health Center in Hyden, Kentucky, needed better cows to provide milk for their mothers and child patients. Kroger noticed a request for "a fine cow, preferably Holstein, for the babies" in the hospital's 1929 newsletter and sent a "generous check".

== Personal life and family ==
At the age of 25, Kroger married Mary Emily Jansen, the daughter of German immigrants. He and Mary had seven children, four girls and three boys. Both Kroger's oldest son and Mary died in 1899 of diphtheria.

== Death and burial ==
Having suffered ill health for several years, Kroger died of a heart attack on July 21, 1938, at his summer home at Wianno Historic District, Cape Cod, Massachusetts, at the age of 78.

His personal estate was valued at $8,854,914 (equivalent to $203 million in 2025). He was buried in Cincinnati's Spring Grove Cemetery.
