= Kroger Hills Camp =

The Kroger Hills Camp for Anemic Children was established and run by the Cincinnati Anti-Tuberculosis League to promote health for children who lived in poor areas of Cincinnati, and had been exposed to tuberculosis but did not have the disease. The camp was run during the summer months in the years 1914-1942. It was known as "Bamford Hills Camp" from 1914 to 1917, and in 1918 was renamed "Kroger Hills Camp".

The camp program included daily exercise, a healthy diet, sun baths for Vitamin D, and other healthful lessons/activities. The intent was to teach the children a healthy lifestyle, with the hope that they would continue their lives with these habits.

== History ==
Businessman Bernard Kroger was a major fund raiser for the Cincinnati Anti-Tuberculosis League, and he helped fund the camp.

The camp was located on a 92-acre tract along US 50 (Wooster Pike) between Mariemont and Terrace Park in the Cincinnati area (Coordinates: 39.151100°N 84.327223°W). In 1916 Kroger offered to spearhead fundraising to double the capacity of the camp. In 1922 the camp treated nearly 500 children who spent from one to ten weeks there during the summer.

In 1929, a similar camp for "Negro children" (newspaper description) was opened near Amelia, Ohio on a 65-acre tract (Coordinates: 38.999332°N 84.173063°W), and was called Kroger Health Farm #2. Both camps operated every summer until ceasing operation after the camping sessions in 1942.

== Current day ==
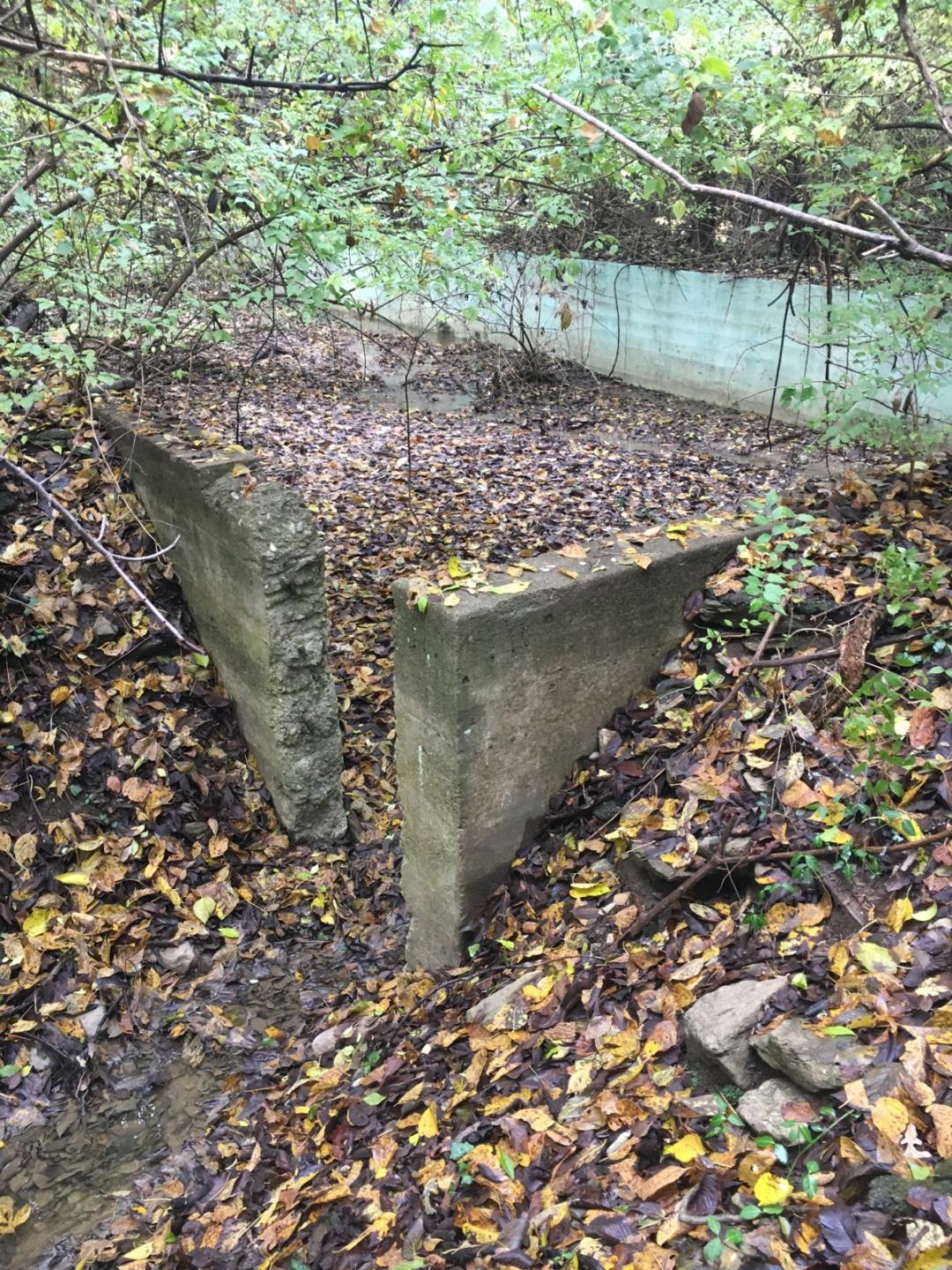
Kroger Hills Camp Large Swimming Pool, view from small swimming pool, picture taken in November 2018. Aqua colored paint still visible.

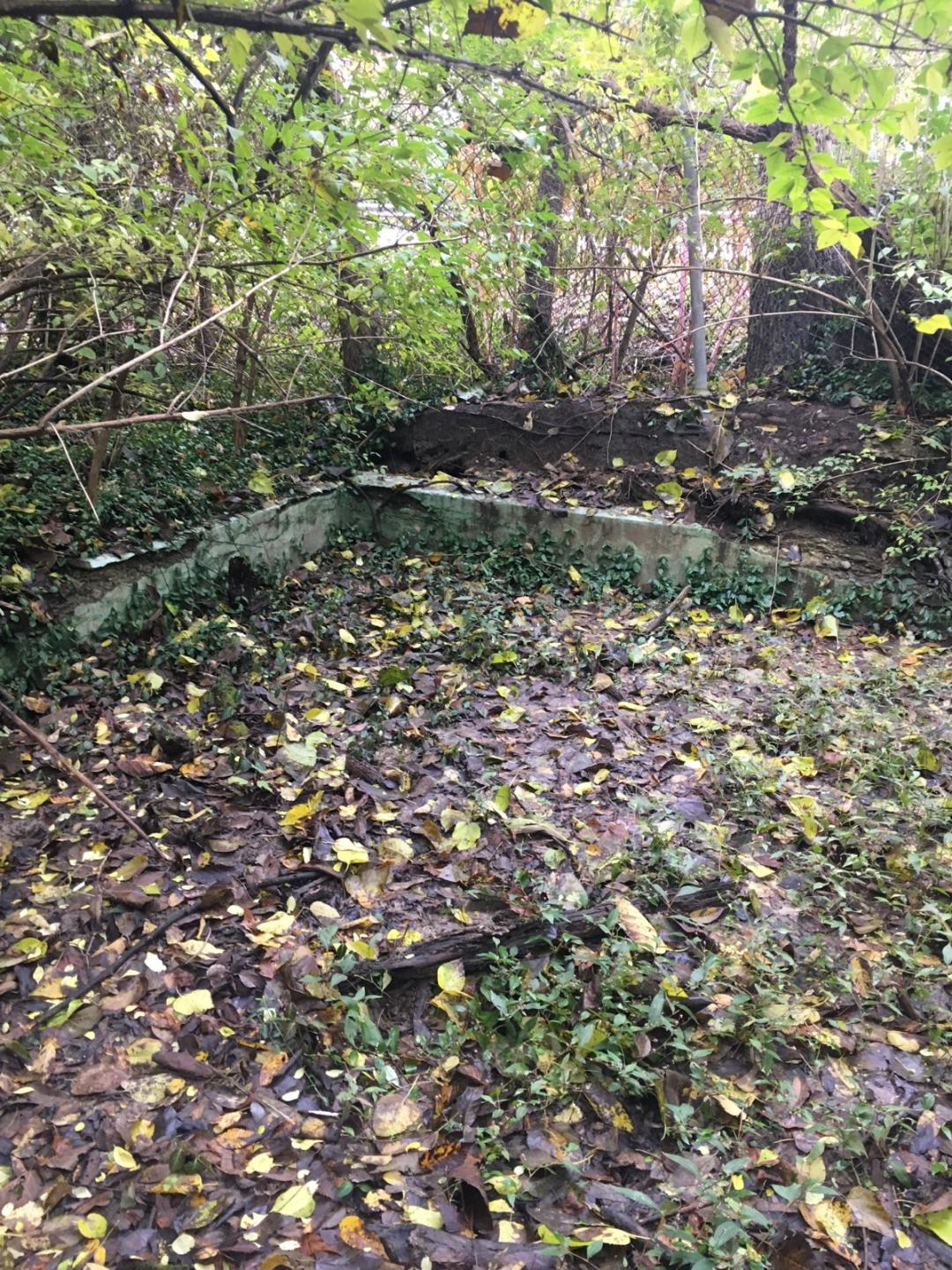
Kroger Hills Camp small swimming pool, view towards US 50, picture taken in November 2018. Aqua colored paint still visible.

The Kroger Hills Camp site along US 50 was not maintained for any use, and as of 2022, the site is overgrown woods, with various concrete foundation remnants in place, including the two swimming pools that are located very close to US 50. Health Farm #2 was sold in 1945 by the Anti-Tuberculosis League to the Churches of Christ of Clermont County (Oh), and is run today as the Woodland Lakes Christian Camp & Retreat Center.
