= Addrup =

- Ortsteil of Essen (Oldenburg)
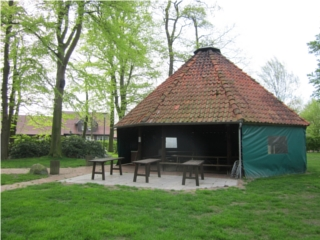
- The Göpelplatz in Addrup

- Location of Addrup within Essen (Oldenburg)
- Interactive map of Addrup
- Location within Germany Location within Lower Saxony
- Coordinates: 52°43′7″N 8°1′39″E
- Country: Germany
- State: Lower Saxony
- District: Cloppenburg
- Town: Essen (Oldenburg)

Area
  - Total: 7.47 km^{2} (2.88 sq mi)
- Elevation: 28 m (92 ft)

Population (2014)
  - Total: 298
  - Density: 39.9/km^{2} (103/sq mi)
- Time zone: UTC+01:00 (CET)
  - Summer (DST): UTC+02:00 (CEST)
- Postal codes: 49632
- Dialling codes: 05438
- Vehicle registration: CL‍P
- Website: addrup.de

Addrup is a village in the district of Cloppenburg, in Lower Saxony, Germany.

== Geography ==
Addrup borders the villages of Gut Lage, Uptloh, Bevern, Calhorn and Stadtsholte within the Essen (Oldenburg) municipality. To the east, Addrup borders Lüsche in the Bakum municipality in the district of Vechta. Being located on the border of the districts of Cloppenburg and Vechta, Addrup is in the center of the Oldenburg Münsterland.

== History ==
The first written proof of Addrup's existence dates to 950 CE, the village initially being named Adathorpe. In 1340 the name changed to Addorpe, in 1376 it was called Adorpe.

In the Middle Ages, the count of Tecklenburg established a free court in Addrup. The village later was part of the Prince-Bishopric of Münster, the Duchy of Oldenburg, the Department of the Upper Ems, afterwards part of the Grand Duchy of Oldenburg, the Free State of Oldenburg, and the Gau Weser-Ems. Since 1946, Addrup is part of the German state of Lower Saxony.

In 1987 the people of Addrup built the Göpelplatz, a village square with a pavilion and a playground for children.

== Economy ==
Main Company in Addrup is Wernsing Feinkost, German company for salads and vegetables products.

== Notable people ==
- Caspar Henry Borgess (1824–1890), bishop of Detroit
- John Henry Kroger (1816–1880), father of businessman Bernard Kroger
- Clemens große Macke (b. 1959), former member of the Lower Saxon Landtag
