= Essen (Oldenburg) =

- Municipality
- Flag Coat of arms

- Location of Essen (Oldenburg) within Cloppenburg district
- Interactive map of Essen (Oldenburg)
- Location within Germany Location within Lower Saxony
- Coordinates: 52°43′16″N 7°56′26″E
- Country: Germany
- State: Lower Saxony
- District: Cloppenburg
- Subdivisions: 14 Ortsteile

Government
  - Mayor (2021–26): Heinrich Kreßmann

Area
  - Total: 97.97 km^{2} (37.83 sq mi)
- Elevation: 26.10 m (85.6 ft)

Population (2025-12-31)
  - Total: 9,350
  - Density: 95.4/km^{2} (247/sq mi)
- Time zone: UTC+01:00 (CET)
  - Summer (DST): UTC+02:00 (CEST)
- Postal codes: 49632
- Dialling codes: 05434, 05438
- Vehicle registration: CLP
- Website: essen-oldb.de

Essen (Oldenburg) (German pronunciation: [ˈɛsn̩]) is a municipality in the district of Cloppenburg, in Lower Saxony, Germany. It is on the river Hase, about 5 kilometres (3.1 mi) north of Quakenbrück and 15 kilometres (9.3 mi) southwest of Cloppenburg.

Subdivision of Essen

Essen consists of the following villages: Addrup, Ahausen, Barlage, Bartmannsholte, Beverdiek, Bevern, Bokel, Brokstreek, Calhorn, Darrel, Essen proper, Felde, Gut Lage, Herbergen, Hülsenmoor, Nordholte, Osteressen, Sandloh and Uptloh.

The reference to Oldenburg serves to allow disambiguation with the much larger Essen (Ruhr). It is part of the official name as stated in the town constitution, which also prescribes the styling using parentheses.

The mayor of Essen is Heinrich Kreßmann, first elected in 2016, and re-elected in 2021. Main companies in Essen are a abattoir of meat company Danish Crown, abattoir of Swiss company Holcim, German company Vogelsang for agriculture vehicles and solutions for pumping systems and German company Hormes, producer of process machines for bottles.
