= St. Mary Cathedral (Lansing, Michigan) =

Catholic cathedral in Lansing, Michigan, US

- Cathedral of the Immaculate Conception
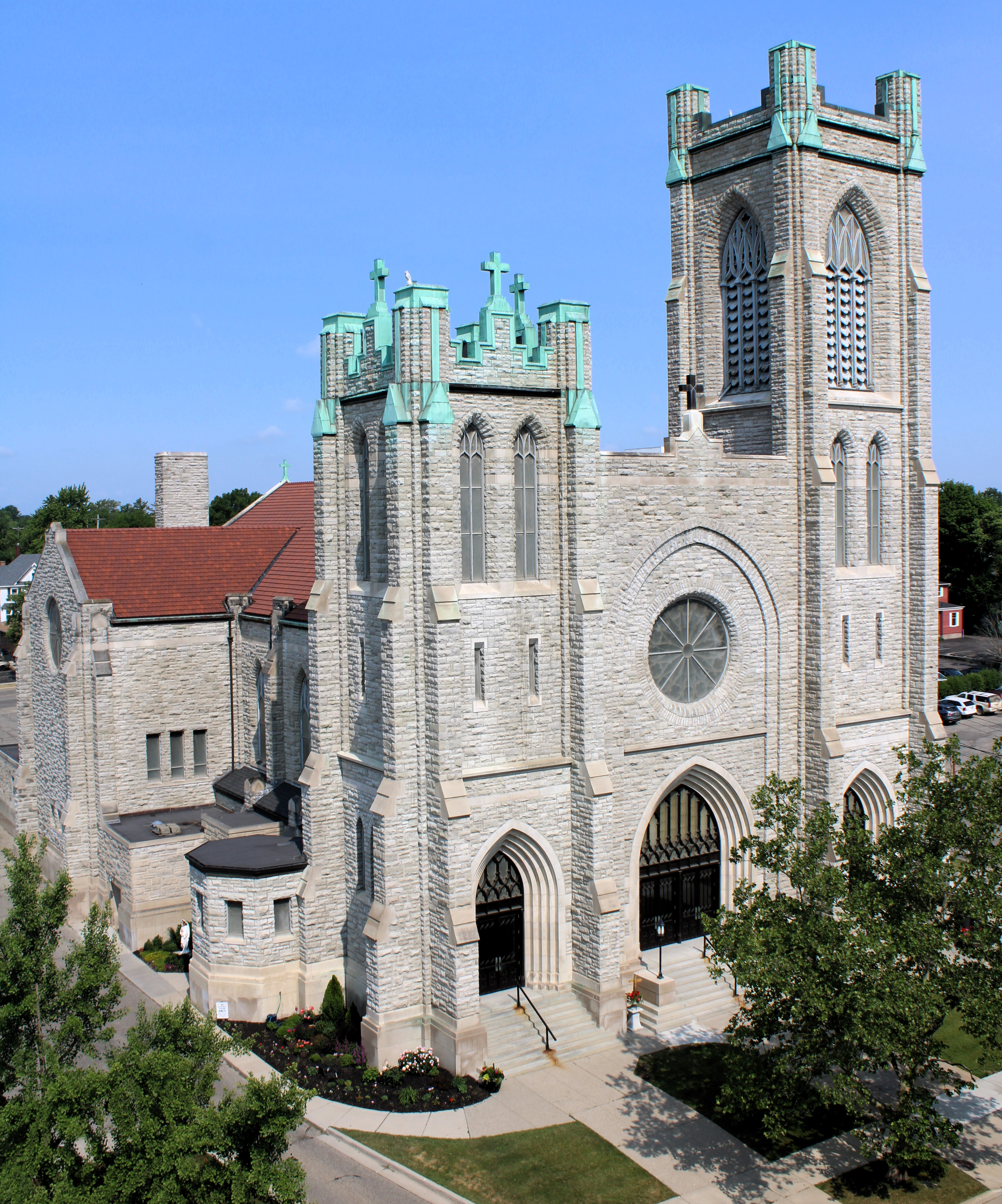
- St. Mary Cathedral
- 42°44′8″N 84°33′22″W
- Location: 229 Seymour Street Lansing, Michigan
- Country: United States
- Language(s): English (1913-current); Polish (parish hall, August 1916-September 1921)
- Denomination: Roman Catholic
- Website: stmarylansing.org

History
- Status: Active
- Founder: Fr. Lafayette Isadore Brancheau
- Dedication: Immaculate Conception of the Blessed Virgin Mary
- Dedicated: December 8, 1913
- Consecrated: December 8, 1913; 112 years ago
- Events: Cornerstone laid: July 4, 1911 (Bishop Edward D. Kelly)

Architecture
- Architect: Edwyn A. Bowd
- Architectural type: Cathedral
- Style: Norman Architecture-Gothic Architecture
- Years built: 1910-1913
- Groundbreaking: 1910; 116 years ago
- Completed: December 8, 1913
- Construction cost: $135,000

Specifications
- Capacity: 1,400 (1913)
- Materials
- St. Mary Cathedral
- U.S. National Register of Historic Places
- Area: less than one acre
- Built: 1913
- Architectural style: Late Gothic Revival
- NRHP reference No.: 90001716
- Added to NRHP: November 2, 1990

Administration
- Archdiocese: Roman Catholic Archdiocese of Detroit (1913-1937)
- Diocese: Roman Catholic Diocese of Lansing (1913-current)
- Parish: Lansing Parish (to 1937)

St. Mary Cathedral is a cathedral of the Roman Catholic Church in Lansing, Michigan one block north of the Michigan State Capitol. It is the seat of the bishop of the Roman Catholic Diocese of Lansing.

== History ==
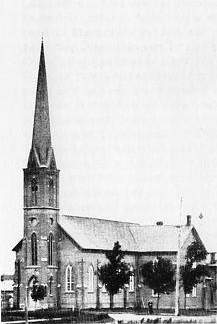
St. Mary's Church

Before the cathedral was built, St. Mary Church, located north of the present church, was dedicated in Lansing in 1866. However, in the late 1800s and early 1900s, Lansing's population grew. The church purchased the land that the present St. Mary's sits on in 1900, and a temporary new church was constructed in 1903. Construction of the permanent new church began in 1911 from a design by Edwyn A. Bowd, and was completed in 1913. The stained glass windows were made in Munich, Germany and installed in 1923. In 1937, the church became the cathedral for the newly formed Diocese of Lansing.

In January 1938, a serious fire broke out in the rectory and Bishop Joseph H. Albers, the survivor of a World War I gas attack, collapsed inside the building before he was rescued by firefighters.

The church has seen four renovations. The first was in the 1920s which added the stained glass windows, Gothic details, and decorative painting behind the altar. The second was in 1954 and removed some of the Gothic details in the sanctuary. Another renovation from 1967 to 1968 removed the communion rail, side altars, and stations of the cross and reconfigured many other elements. The most recent was in 1986 that restored some of the elements removed from the previous renovation.

== Description ==
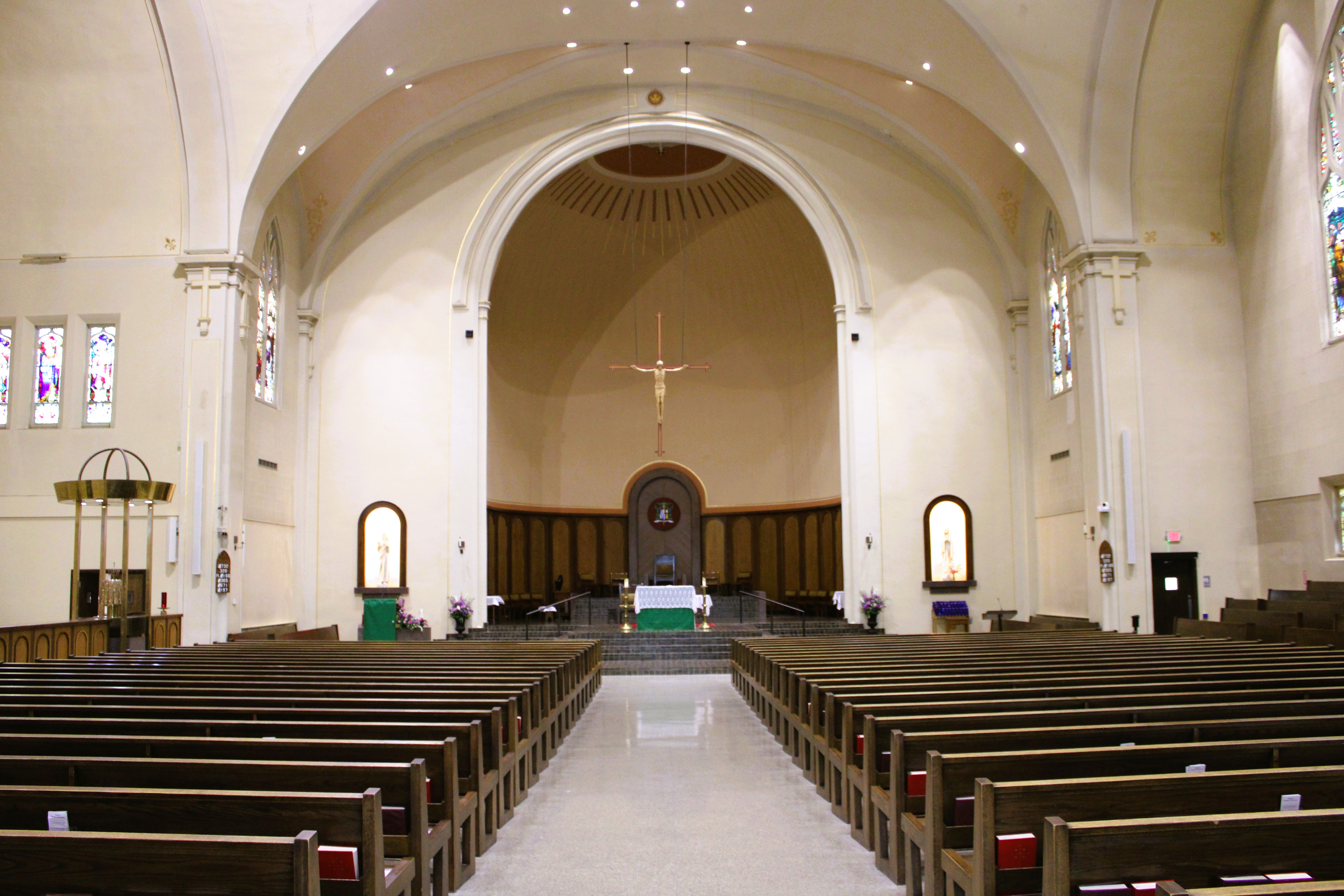
Cathedral interior

St. Mary Cathedral is a Gothic Revival style church constructed in a cruciform shape of rock-face limestone with the water table and other details of smooth-faced limestone. The church sits on a granite foundation, and had a red ceramic tile gable roof. On the main facade is a central, Gothic-arched portal flanked by two smaller portals of similar design. A rose window is recessed above the center entrance. On the corners are large square towers, one taller than the other by the height of the belfry. The towers are set flush with the front wall.

On the interior is a vestibule in front, opening through glass doors into the nave, which measures 108 feet by 63 feet. The nave has terrazzo floors, and a high, vaulted plaster ceiling.

== See also ==
- List of Catholic cathedrals in the United States
- List of cathedrals in the United States
