= St. Patrick's Parish Complex =

Historic church in Michigan, United States

- U.S. National Register of Historic Places
- U.S. Historic district
- Michigan State Historic Site
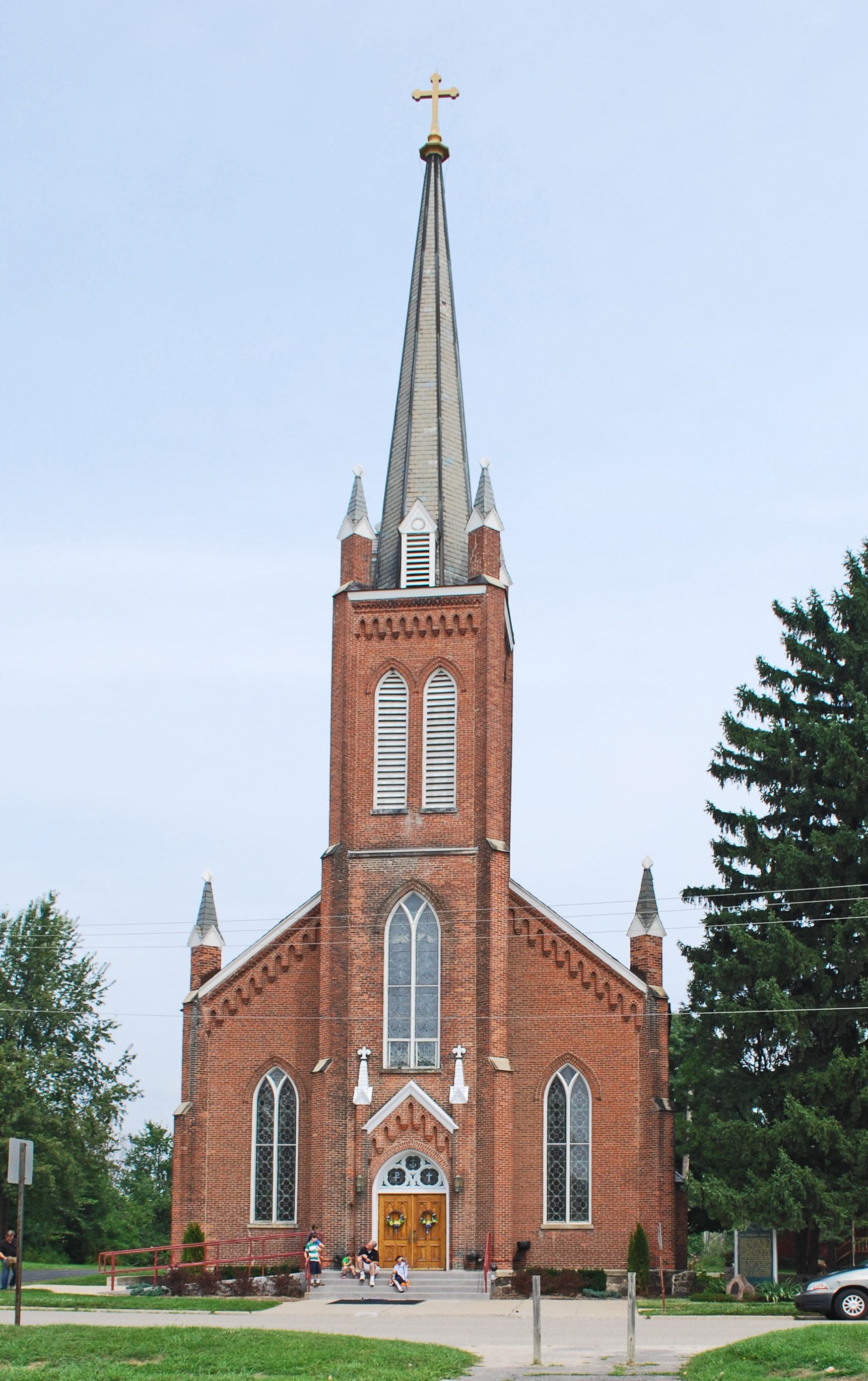

- Location within Michigan Location within the United States
- Interactive map
- Location: Northfield Church and Whitmore Lake Rds., Northfield Township, Michigan
- Coordinates: 42°21′29″N 83°45′1″W
- Area: 5.5 acres (2.2 ha)
- Built: 1878
- Architectural style: Gothic Revival
- NRHP reference No.: 82002889

Significant dates
- Added to NRHP: April 23, 1982
- Designated MSHS: December 14, 1976

St. Patrick's Parish Complex is a historic church building, with associated rectory and cemetery, located at Northfield Church and Whitmore Lake Roads in Northfield Township, Michigan, near the city of Ann Arbor. The complex was added to the National Register of Historic Places in 1982 and designated a Michigan State Historic Site in 1976. The complex is significant both because of its historical association with the early Irish Catholics in the area, and because of the architecturally important Gothic Revival church.

== History ==
In the early 19th century, a number of Irish Catholics began settling in this area of Michigan. In 1829, Kilkenny, Ireland native Father Patrick O'Kelly was dispatched to the area to minister to the growing community. The property upon which the present church now stands was purchased in 1831, and a log structure was constructed to serve as the first parish church. The parish was originally named "St. Brigid," and is the oldest English-speaking Catholic parish in the state.

Construction on the current church building was begun in 1875 and completed in 1878; the parish was renamed "St. Patrick's" at that time. A rectory was added in 1889–90. In 1917, a tornado badly damaged both the church and the rectory; both were rebuilt. The church is still used for weekly services.

== Description ==
The St. Patrick's Parish complex contains a church with associated cemetery and rectory. The church is a red brick Gothic revival structure on a rough-hewn stone foundation. The façade of the church is symmetric, with a square central tower surmounted by an octagonal spire. The entrance is through a gabled projection at the base of the tower. A lancet window pierces the tower, and similar windows run along the building sides.

The nearby rectory is a two-story center entrance brick structure.

== Gallery ==
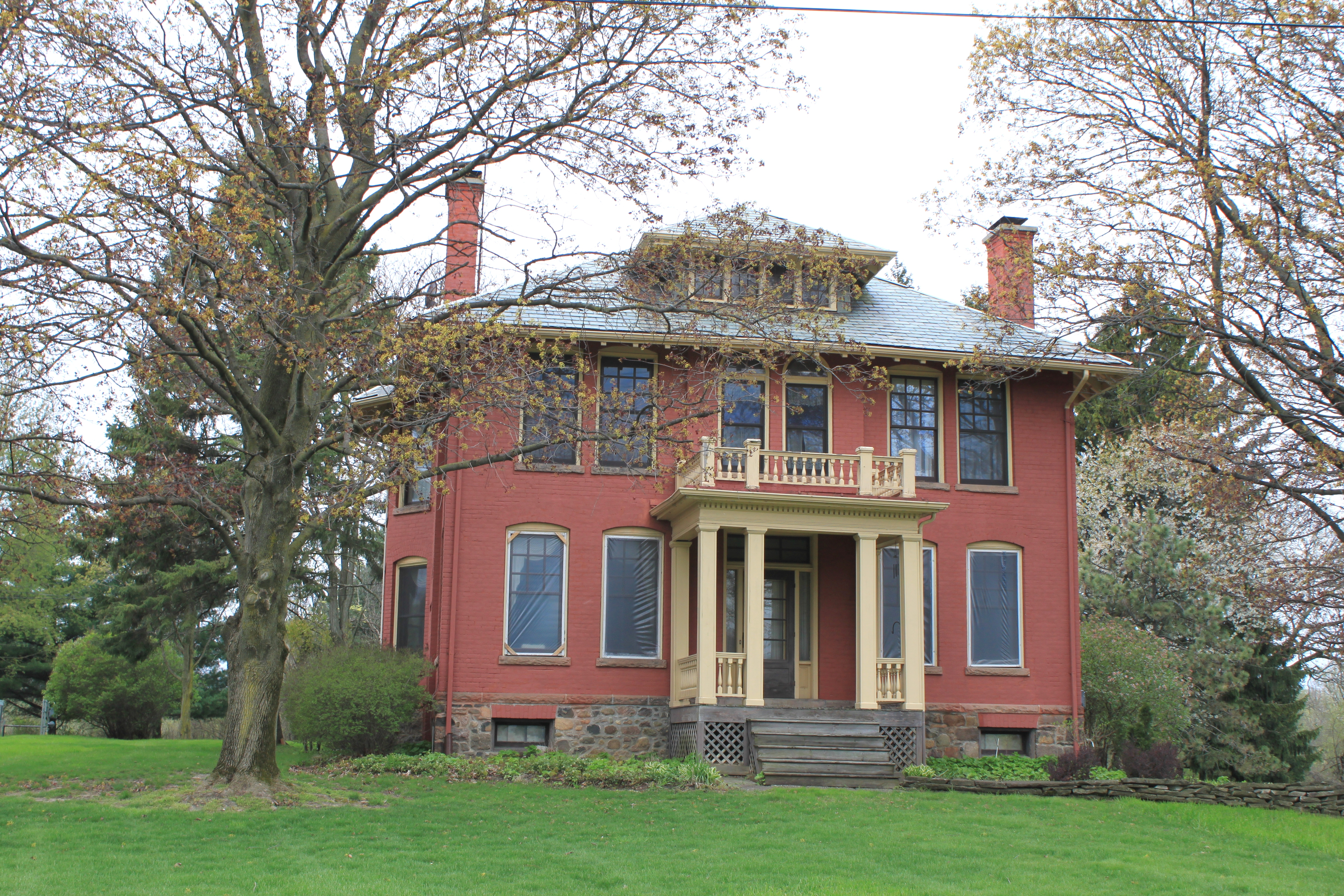
Rectory

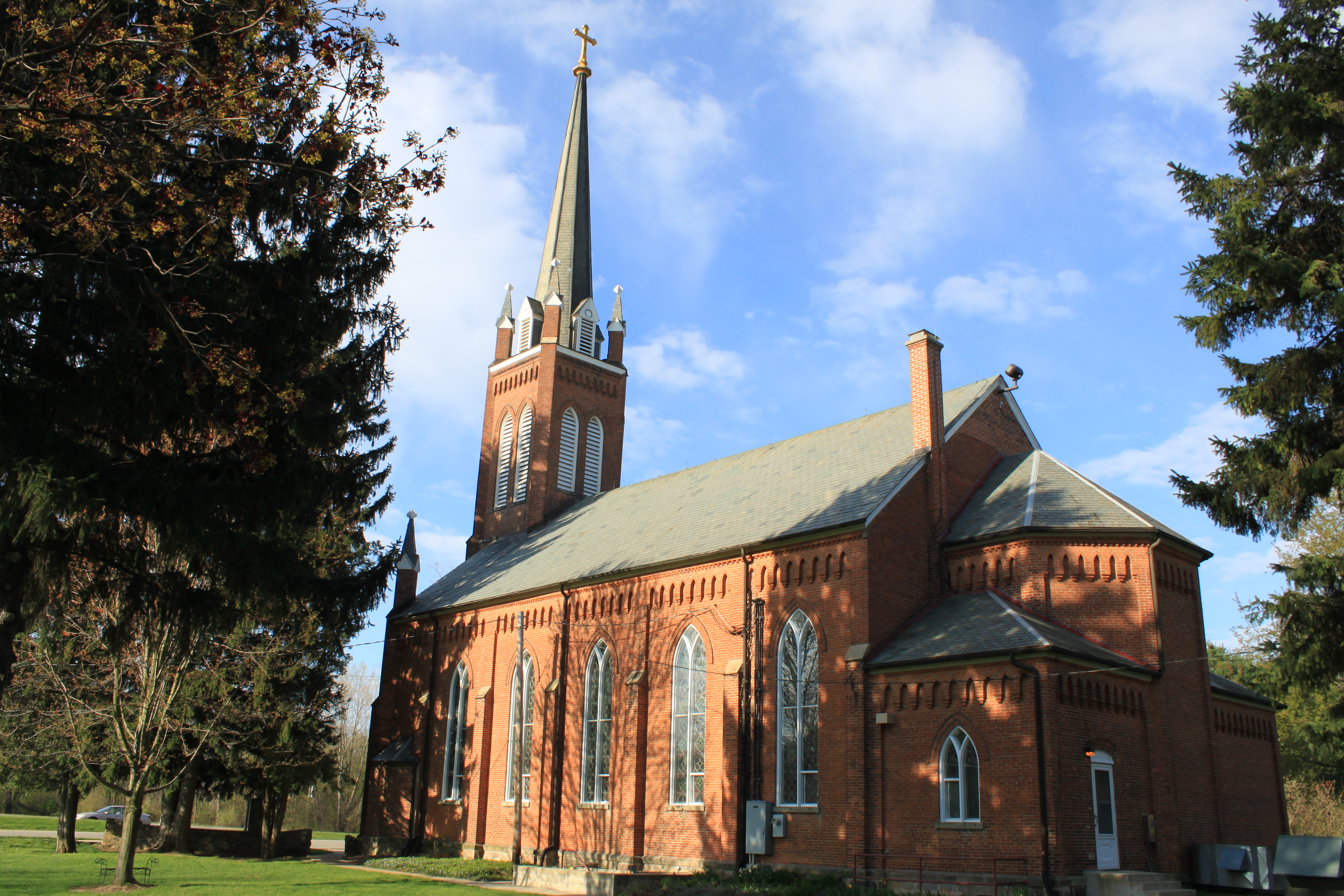
Side view of church

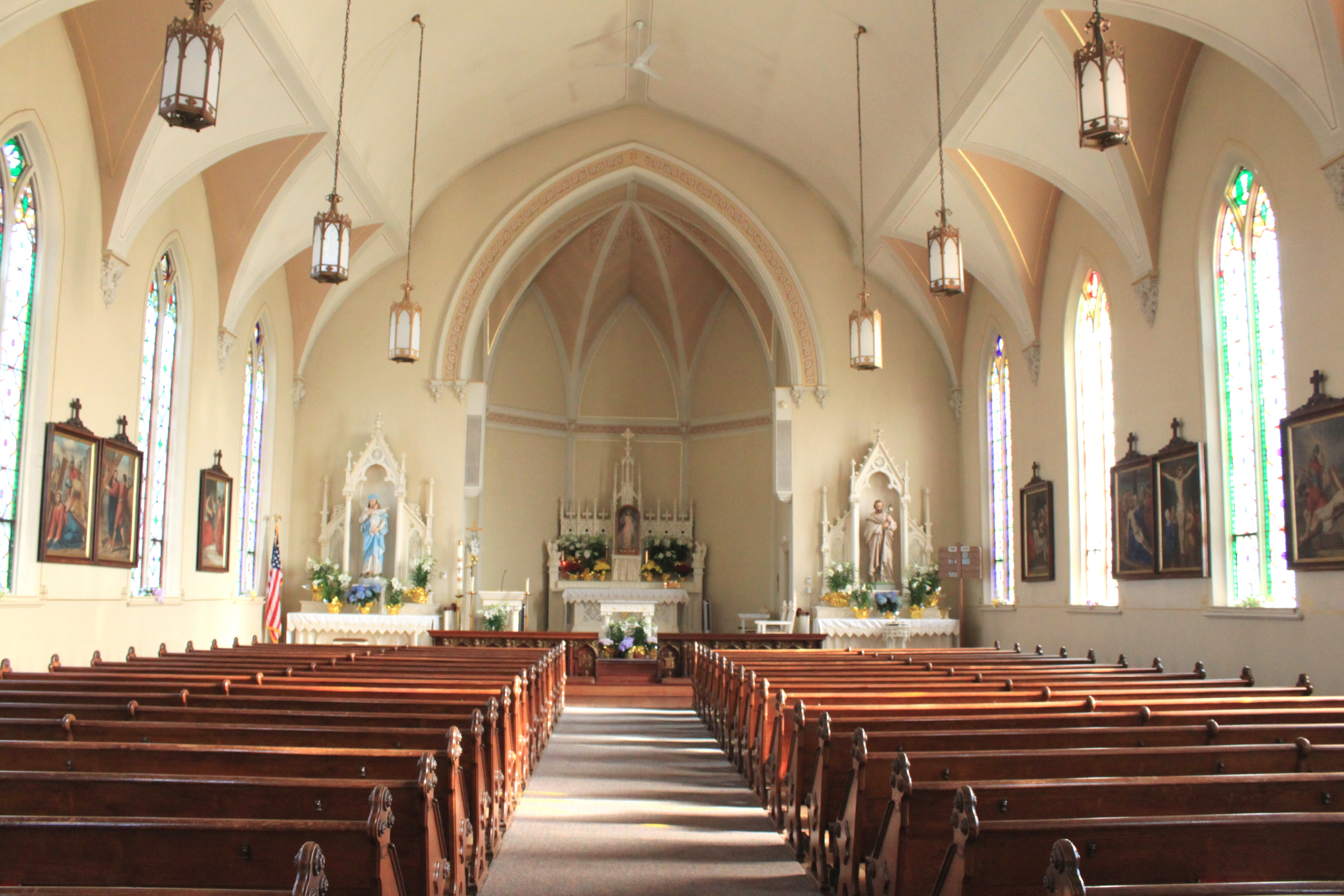
Interior of church
