= Peter Paul Lefevere =

Coadjutor Bishop of Detroit

Most Reverend Peter Paul Lefevere, DD
- Coadjutor Bishop of Detroit
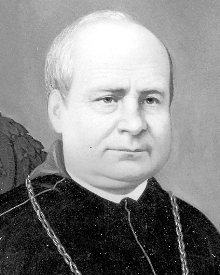
- Church: Catholic Church
- See: Detroit
- In office: July 23, 1841—March 4, 1869

Orders
- Ordination: November 20, 1831 by Joseph Rosati
- Consecration: November 21, 1841 by Francis Patrick Kenrick

Personal details
- Born: April 30, 1804 Roeselare, Lys, French Republic
- Died: March 4, 1869 (aged 64) Detroit, Michigan, U.S.

Peter Paul Lefevere, or Lefebre (April 30, 1804 – March 4, 1869), was a 19th-century Belgian-born bishop of the Catholic Church in the United States. He was a missionary priest in the states of Missouri, Illinois and Iowa before he served as coadjutor bishop of the Diocese of Detroit in the state of Michigan from 1841 to 1869.

== Early life and ministry ==
Pierre-Paul Lefevere was born in Roeselare (French: Roulers), West Flanders, Belgium to Charles and Albertine (Muylle) Lefevere. He was educated in Paris at the Lazarist seminary, and left for the United States in 1828 where he completed his studies for the priesthood at The Barrens in Perryville, Missouri. He was ordained a priest in St. Louis, Missouri by Bishop Joseph Rosati in 1831. His first appointment was to New Madrid, Missouri but was transferred after a few months to Salt River. The parish territory included mission stations in northern Missouri, western Illinois and southern Iowa. His health was affected by the extent of his work, and in 1841 he returned to Europe to rest.

== Diocese of Detroit ==
While Lefevere was in Rome Pope Gregory XVI named him titular bishop of Zela and coadjutor bishop of Detroit on July 23, 1841. In effect, Lefevere would be the leader of the Detroit diocese, as Bishop Frederick Rese had become incapacitated for unspecified reasons and had returned to Europe, while retaining the title of Bishop of Detroit until his death in 1871. (As coadjutor, Bishop Lefevere exercised the authority of a diocesan bishop as the administrator of the diocese, but he never held the title of Bishop of Detroit.) He returned to the United States and was consecrated on November 21, 1841, by Bishop Francis Patrick Kenrick of Philadelphia. The principal co-consecrators were Bishops John England of Charleston and John Joseph Hughes of New York.

This was a period of growth for the Catholic Church in Michigan. When Lefevere arrived in Detroit, the diocese covered the Michigan Territory, which at the time encompassed modern-day Iowa, Minnesota and Wisconsin, as well as all of Michigan. There were two parishes in the city and only twenty-five in the diocese. During his time as bishop the number of parishes in the city increased to eleven and 160 in the diocese, which was reduced to the lower peninsula of Michigan in 1853. There were 18 priests in the diocese when he arrived and that number grew to 88 by the time of his death. He went to Belgium to recruit priests and the Redemptorists were the first order to staff a parish. He established St. Thomas Seminary, most likely in his own home. With Bishop Martin Spalding of Louisville, he established the American College at Louvain in Belgium for the education of new priests and assigned four of his priests as the first four rectors of the school.

The diocese under Rese had been poorly run and suffered from financial mismanagement. Lefevere established diocesan statutes in 1843 and presided over the first diocesan synod in 1859. He won a dispute with some of the laity over the ownership of church property. He built Saints Peter and Paul Church in Detroit, which became his cathedral in 1848, replacing Ste. Anne de Detroit. He bought property throughout the diocese where possible churches could be built. This became a financial investment for the diocese to draw upon to carry out its mission.

Lefevere also served the larger church in the United States. He took an active role in the provincial councils of Baltimore and Cincinnati. In 1852 he attended the First Plenary Council of Baltimore and the Second Plenary Council in 1866.

Bishop Lefevere and the Four Sisters of Charity helped to establish several charitable institutions in the diocese, which included four orphanages, a hospital and an asylum for the mentally ill. The Daughters of Charity became the first order of teaching sisters to come to Detroit. The Sisters, Servants of the Immaculate Heart of Mary were established in the diocese in 1845. Numerous other religious orders of men and women were introduced to the diocese to teach in schools and staff parishes. He took care of the pastoral needs of the Native Americans and those of mixed-blood in his diocese. He was an advocate of the Temperance Movement, especially among Native Americans.

Lefevere died in Detroit at the age of 64 after serving the Diocese of Detroit for 28 years, and was buried in Saints Peter and Paul Cathedral. His remains were later transferred to Holy Sepulcher Cemetery to be with other bishops of Detroit.
