= James Albert Murray =

American Catholic bishop (1932–2020)

His Excellency, The Most Reverend James Albert Murray
- Bishop of Kalamazoo
- See: Diocese of Kalamazoo
- Appointed: November 18, 1997
- Installed: January 27, 1998
- Term ended: April 6, 2009
- Predecessor: Alfred John Markiewicz
- Successor: Paul J. Bradley

Orders
- Ordination: June 7, 1958 by Joseph H. Albers
- Consecration: January 27, 1998 by Adam Maida, Paul Vincent Donovan, and Carl Frederick Mengeling

Personal details
- Born: July 5, 1932 Jackson, Michigan, US
- Died: June 5, 2020 (aged 87) Kalamazoo, Michigan, US
- Denomination: Roman Catholic Church
- Education: Sacred Heart Major Seminary; St. John's Provincial Seminary; Catholic University of America
- Motto: Rejoice in the Lord always

Styles of James Albert Murray
- Reference style: His Excellency; The Most Reverend
- Spoken style: Your Excellency
- Religious style: Bishop

James Albert Murray (July 5, 1932 – June 5, 2020) was an American prelate of the Roman Catholic Church. He served as bishop of the Diocese of Kalamazoo in Michigan from 1998 to 2009.

== Biography ==
=== Early life ===
James Murray was born on July 5, 1932, in Jackson, Michigan, to James Albert and Marcella Clare (née Harris) Murray. He had two older brothers, Joseph and William. The younger James Murray attended St. Mary's elementary and high schools in Jackson. In high school, he enjoyed boxing and baseball, and was elected senior class president.

After deciding to become a priest, Murray entered Sacred Heart Seminary in Detroit, Michigan obtaining a Bachelor of Arts. Murray then attended St. John's Provincial Seminary in Plymouth, Michigan, earning his Bachelor of Sacred Theology degree.

=== Priesthood ===
Murray was ordained to the priesthood at St. Mary Cathedral in Lansing, Michigan, for the Diocese of Lansing by Bishop Joseph Albers on June 7, 1958. After his ordination, Murray was assigned as parochial vicar of St. Joseph Parish in St. Joseph, Michigan, serving there until 1961. That year, he was transferred to be an assistant pastor at St. Mary Cathedral Parish.

In 1962, Murray went to Washington, D.C., to attend the Catholic University of America School of Canon Law. He received a Licentiate of Canon Law there in 1964. After returning to Lansing, Murray was appointed assistant pastor of St. Therese Parish. He was transferred to St. Gerard Parish in Lansing in 1968. In 1973, he was appointed rector of St. Mary Cathedral.

In 1968. Murray was appointed chancellor of the diocese, a position he would hold until 1997. He also served as moderator of the curia, tribunal judge, and ecumenical officer. Murray served as chaplain of the Lansing Police Department and sat on several committees of the Michigan Catholic Conference. He was raised to the rank of honorary prelate of his holiness in 1993.

=== Bishop of Kalamazoo ===
On November 18, 1997, Murray was appointed as the third bishop of the Diocese of Kalamazoo by Pope John Paul II. He received his episcopal consecration on January 27, 1998, from Cardinal Adam Maida, with Bishops Paul Donovan and Carl Mengeling serving as co-consecrators, in St. Augustine Cathedral in Kalamazoo. He selected as his episcopal motto: "Rejoice in the Lord always".

in 2006. Murray released the “Diocesan Pastoral Plan for Hispanic Latino Ministry.” He also established the diocese Trauma Recovery Program for victims of childhood trauma. Murray served as an advisor to the Michigan Catholic Conference (MCC) and wrote its program on assisted suicide education in 1993. Within the United States Conference of Catholic Bishops, Murray sat on the Ad Hoc Committee on Sexual Abuse. Murray was a member of the committee for the American College of Louvain as well.

=== Retirement and legacy ===
On reaching the mandatory retirement age of 75 for bishops in 2007, Murray submitted his letter of resignation as bishop of Kalamazoo to Pope Benedict XVI. His resignation was accepted on April 6, 2009. He served as apostolic administrator of Kalamazoo until the installation of his successor, Bishop Paul J. Bradley, on June 6, 2009.

James Murray died in Kalamazoo on June 5, 2020, at the age of 87.

Catholic Church titles
| Preceded by Alfred John Markiewicz | Bishop of Kalamazoo; 1998–2009 | Succeeded by Paul J. Bradley |
