= Alfred John Markiewicz =

American prelate

His Excellency, The Most Reverend Alfred John Markiewicz
- Bishop of Kalamazoo; Titular Bishop of Afufenia
- Church: Roman Catholic Church
- See: Diocese of Kalamazoo
- Installed: January 31, 1995
- Term ended: January 8, 1997
- Predecessor: Paul Vincent Donovan
- Successor: James Albert Murray
- Other posts: Auxiliary Bishop of Rockville Centre (1986-1995)

Orders
- Ordination: June 6, 1953 by Thomas Edmund Molloy
- Consecration: September 17, 1986 by John R. McGann

Personal details
- Born: May 17, 1928 Brooklyn, New York, US
- Died: January 8, 1997 Huntington, New York, US
- Motto: An instrument of your peace

Alfred John Markiewicz (May 17, 1928 – January 9, 1997) was an American prelate of the Catholic Church who served as bishop of the Diocese of Kalamazoo in Michigan, from 1994 to 1997. He previously served as an auxiliary bishop of the Diocese of Rockville Centre in New York from 1986 to 1995.

== Biography ==
=== Early life ===
Alfred Markiewicz was born on May 17, 1928, in Brooklyn, New York. He was ordained to the priesthood at St. James Pro-Cathedral in Brooklyn by Archbishop Thomas Edmund Molloy on June 6, 1953, for the Diocese of Brooklyn. Markiewicz was incardinated, or transferred, to the Diocese of Rockville Centre on April 6, 1957.

=== Auxiliary Bishop of Rockville Centre ===
Pope John Paul II appointed Markiewicz as titular bishop of Afufenia and as an auxiliary bishop of Rockville Centre on July 1, 1986. He was consecrated at Saint Agnes Cathedral in Rockville Centre, New York, by Bishop John Raymond McGann on September 17, 1986.

=== Bishop of Kalamazoo ===
On November 22, 1994, John Paul II appointed Markiewicz as bishop of Kalamazoo. He was installed in Kalamazoo, Michigan, on January 31, 1995.In September 1996, Markiewicz travelled to Rockville Centre for radiation treatment of two brain tumors. Alfred Markiewicz died in Huntington, New York, on January 8, 1997.

== Notes ==
Catholic Church titles
Preceded by Paul Vincent Donovan	Bishop of Kalamazoo; 1995–1997	Succeeded by James Albert Murray
Preceded by –	Auxiliary Bishop of Rockville Centre; 1986–1994	Succeeded by –
