= List of churches in the Diocese of Kalamazoo =

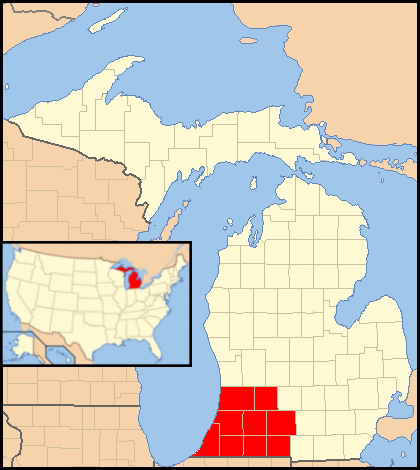
Diocese of Kalamazoo in red

This is a list of current and former Roman Catholic churches in the Roman Catholic Diocese of Kalamazoo. The diocese is located in the southwestern portion of Michigan's lower peninsula and includes more than 55 churches in the cities of Battle Creek and Kalamazoo and the counties of Allegan, Van Buren, Berrien, Cass, Saint Joseph, Kalamazoo, Branch, Calhoun, and Barry.

The cathedral church of the diocese is the Cathedral of Saint Augustine in Kalamazoo.

== Battle Creek ==
Name	Image	Location	Description/notes
St. Jerome	St.Jerome-Battle Creek	229 Collier Ave, Battle Creek	Founded in 1955, church dedicated in 1957
St. Joseph	St.Joseph-Battle Creek	61 N. 23rd St, Battle Creek	
St. Philip		112 Capital Ave NE, Battle Creek	Found in 1849; current Romanesque church built in 1929

== Benton Harbor and St. Joseph ==
Name	Image	Location	Description/notes
Ss. John & Bernard Parish	St. Bernard- Benton Harbor	St. Bernard of Clairvaux Church, 555 E. Delaware Ave, Benton Harbor	Founded in 1961, merged with St. John
	St. John-Benton Harbor	St. John the Evangelist Church, 600 Columbus Ave, Benton Harbor	Founded as mission church in 1891, merged with St. Bernard
St. Joseph Parish	St. Joseph-St. Joseph	St. Joseph Downtown, 220 Church St, St. Joseph	Parish traces roots to 1850, current church built in 1869;
	St. Joseph-Stevensville	St. Joseph South, 5353 Roosevelt Rd, Stevensville	Part of St. Joseph Parish in St. Joseph

== Kalamazoo ==
Name	Image	Location	Description/notes
Cathedral of St. Augustine		542 W Michigan Ave, Kalamazoo	Parish began as a mission in 1843; current cathedral built 1950-1951
St. Joseph	St. Joseph-Kalamazoo	936 Lake St, Kalamazoo	Established as a mission in 1904
St. Mary	St. Mary-Kalamazoo	939 Charlotte Ave, Kalamazoo	
St. Monica	Saint Monica-Kalamazoo	4408 S, Westnedge Ave, Kalamazoo	Founded in 1955, church dedicated in 1957
St. Thomas More	St. Thomas More-Kalamazoo	421 Monroe St, Kalamazoo	Western Michigan University student parish

== Other areas ==
Name	Image	Location	Description/notes
St. John the Evangelist	St. John the Evangelist-Albion	1020 Irwin Ave, Albion	
Blessed Sacrament	Blessed Sacrament-Allegan	110 Cedar St, Allegan	
Sacred Heart	Sacred Heart- Allegan	2036 20th, Allegan	
St. Ann	St. Ann-Augusta	12648 East D Avenue, Augusta	
Sacred Heart	Sacred Heart- Bangor	201 S Walnut St, Bangor	
St. Gabriel	St. Gabriel- Berrien Springs	429 Rose Hill, Berrien Springs	
Our Lady Queen of Peace	Our Lady Queen of Peace- Bridgman	3903 Lake St, Bridgman	
St. Mary's Assumption	St. Mary's Assumption-Bronson	602 W Chicago St, Bronson	
St. Anthony	St. Anthony-Buchanan	509 W Fourth St, Buchanan	
St. Mary's Visitation	St. Mary's Visitation-Byron Center	2459 146th Ave, Byron Center	
St. Ann	St. Ann-Cassoplis	421 N Broadway St, Cassopolis	
St. Clare	St. Clare-Centreville	23226 M-86, Centreville	
St. Charles Borromeo	St. Charles Borromeo-Coldwater	150 Taylor St, Coldwater	
St. Barbara	St. Barbara-Colon	479 S Burr Oak Rd, Colon	
Holy Family	Holy Family-Decatur	500 W St. Mary St, Decatur	
St. Peter	Saint Peter-Douglas	100 St. Peter Dr, Douglas	
St. Stanislaus	St. Stanislaus-Dorr	1871 136th Ave, Dorr	
Holy Maternity of Mary	Holy Maternity of Mary-Dowagiac	210 N Front St, Dowagiac	
Sacred Heart of Mary		51841 Leach St, Dowagiac	Silver Creek Township
Our Lady of the Lake	Our Lady of the Lake-Edwardsburg	24832 US 12 East, Edwardsburg	
San Felipe de Jesus	San Felipe de Jesus-Fennville	5586 117th Ave, Fennville	
St. Jude	St. Jude-Gobles	13809 N M-40, Gobles	
Immaculate Conception & Sacred Heart	Immaculate Conception & Sacred Heart-Hartford	63559 60th Ave, Hartford	
St. Rose of Lima	St. Rose of Lima-Hastings	805 S Jefferson Ave, Hastings	
St. Margaret Mary	St. Margaret Mary-Marcellus	296 E Dibble St, Marcellus	
St. Mary	St. Mary-Marshall	212 Hanover Street, Marshall	
St. John Bosco	St. John Bosco-Mattawan	23830 Front Ave, Mattawan	
St. Edward	St. Edward-Mendon	332 W State St, Mendon	
St. Cyril		203 N State St, Nashville	
St. Mary of the Lake	St. Mary of the Lake-New Buffalo	718 W Buffalo Ave, New Buffalo	
St. Mark	St. Mark-Niles	3 N 19th St, Niles	
St. Mary of the Immaculate Conception		219 S State St, Niles	
St. Margaret	St. Margaret-Otsego	766 S Farmer St, Otsego	
St. Ambrose	St. Ambrose-Parchment	1628 East G Ave, Parchment	
St. Mary	St. Mary-Paw Paw	500 Paw Paw St, Paw Paw	
St. Catherine of Siena	St. Catherine of Siena-Portage	1150 W Centre Ave, Portage	
St. Agnes	St. Agnes-Sawyer	5760 Sawyer Rd, Sawyer	
St. Basil	St. Basil-South Haven	513 Monroe Blvd, South Haven	
Holy Angels	Holy Angels-Sturgis	402 S Nottawa, Sturgis	
St. Mary of the Assumption	St. Mary of the Assumption-Three Oaks	28 W Ash St, Three Oaks	
Immaculate Conception	Immaculate Conception-Three Rivers	645 S Douglas, Three Rivers	
Our Lady of Fatima	Our Lady of Fatima-Union City	8220 M-60, Union City	
St. Martin of Tours	St. Martin of Tours-Vicksburg,MI	5855 E. W Ave, Vicksburg	
St. Joseph	St. Joseph-Watervliet	157 Lucinda Lane, Watervliet	
Ss. Cyril and Methodius	Ss. Cyril and Methodius-Wayland	159 131st Ave, Wayland	
St. Therese of Lisieux	St. Therese of Lisieux-Wayland	128 Cedar St, Wayland	
St. Joseph	St. Joseph-White Pigeon	16603 US 12, White Pigeon	
