= Cathedral of Saint Augustine (Kalamazoo, Michigan) =

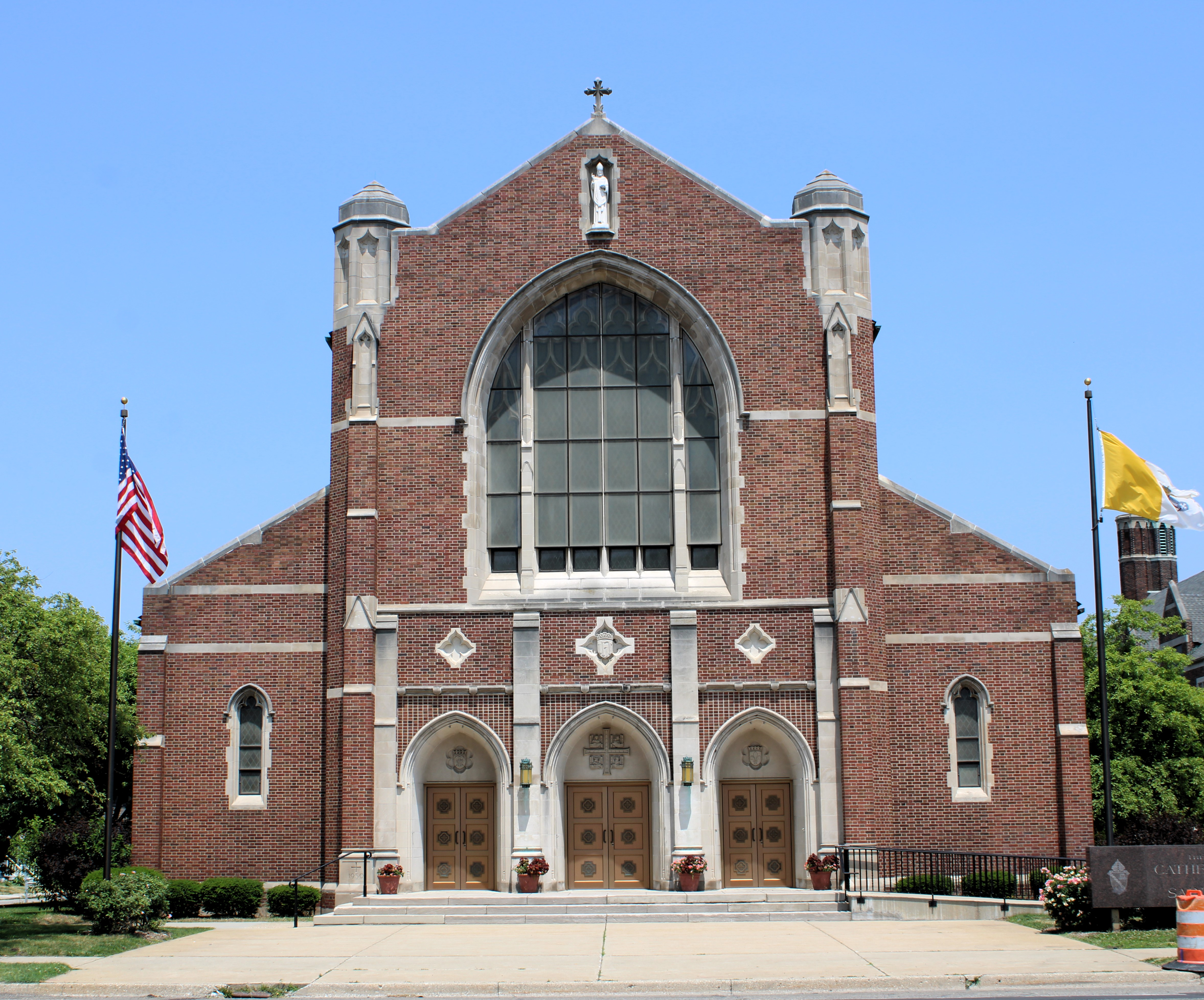

- Location in Michigan
- 42°17′31″N 85°35′31″W
- Location: 542 W. Michigan Ave. Kalamazoo, Michigan
- Country: United States
- Denomination: Roman Catholic Church
- Website: www.stakalamazoo.org

History
- Founded: 1856
- Consecrated: 1951

Architecture
- Style: Gothic Revival
- Completed: 1951

Specifications
- Materials: Brick

Administration
- Diocese: Kalamazoo

Clergy
- Bishop: Most Rev. Edward M. Lohse
- Rector: Very Rev. Robert Creagan

Cathedral of Saint Augustine (or St. Augustine Cathedral) is a Catholic cathedral and parish church located in Kalamazoo, Michigan, United States. It is the seat of the Bishop of the Diocese of Kalamazoo. The parish was founded in 1856, the present church building was completed in 1951, and it was raised to cathedral status in 1970.

== History ==
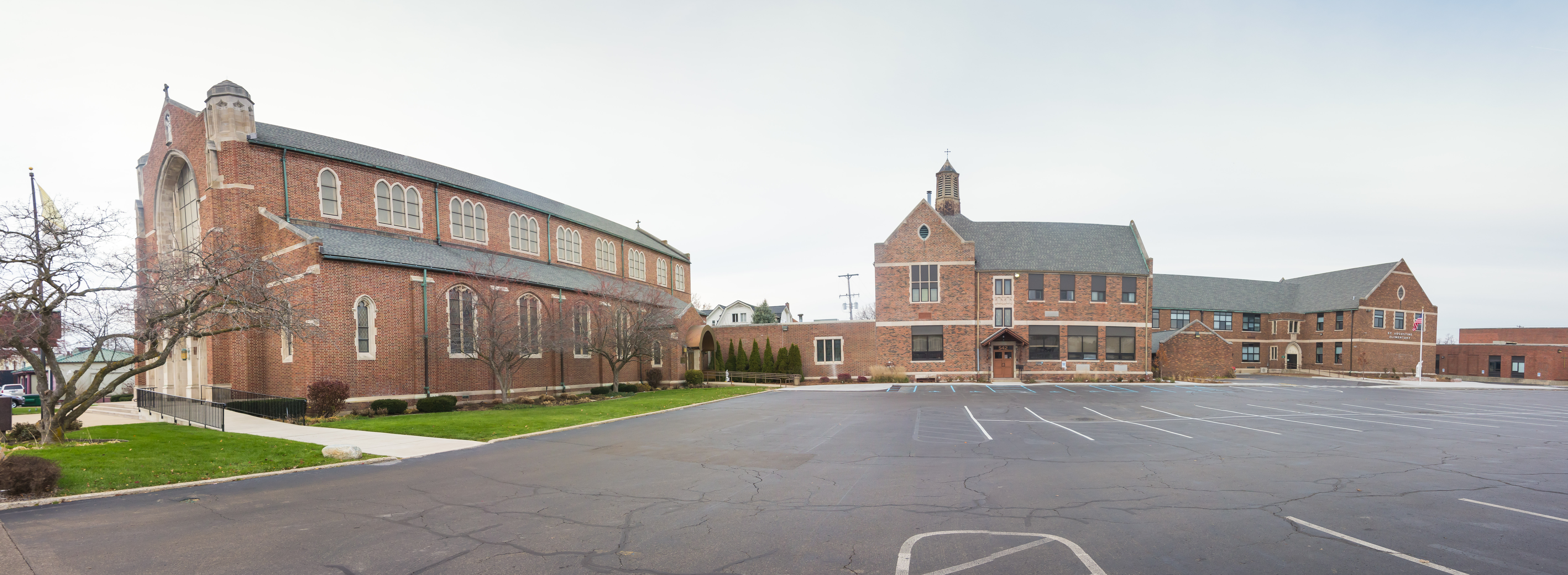
Panorama of the parish plant.

Dennis Talbot was the first Catholic to settle in this area, known for its anti-Catholic sentiments. The first Mass in Kalamazoo was celebrated in his home by Father De Seille in 1832. A mission was established in Kalamazoo in 1843 and placed under the care of the Rev. Edward Sorin, C.S.C. from Notre Dame in South Bend, Indiana. Framework for a church was erected the following year, but it was felled in a windstorm and the building was not completed.

The local residents constructed a church in 1852 as a mission used by traveling priests. The building measured 30 by 60 feet (9.1 by 18.3 m). It was located on West Kalamazoo Avenue, west of Park Street. Detroit bishop Peter Paul Lefevère established the parish of St. Augustine. He appointed the Rev. Anthony Isidoro Label as the permanent pastor in a letter dated January 22, 1856. The parish of 47 families covered all of Kalamazoo County, Van Buren County and Allegan County. It later included St. Joseph County and Barry County, and temporarily, Berrien County. Label had a rectory constructed, and by 1869 the church building was no longer safe and inadequate for the growing congregation. It was replaced by a new church on the same site. The parish did not have adequate funds to build the new church so Label relied on parishioner Patrick Bunbury. He was a wealthy farmer who mortgaged his farm to pay for the twin-spired brick structure. Bunbury expected to be repaid once the building was up, but he didn't realize that all church properties became the possession of the bishop, who refused to pay him. Bunbury sued Bishop Borgess in court, but withdrew the suit when he was threatened with excommunication.

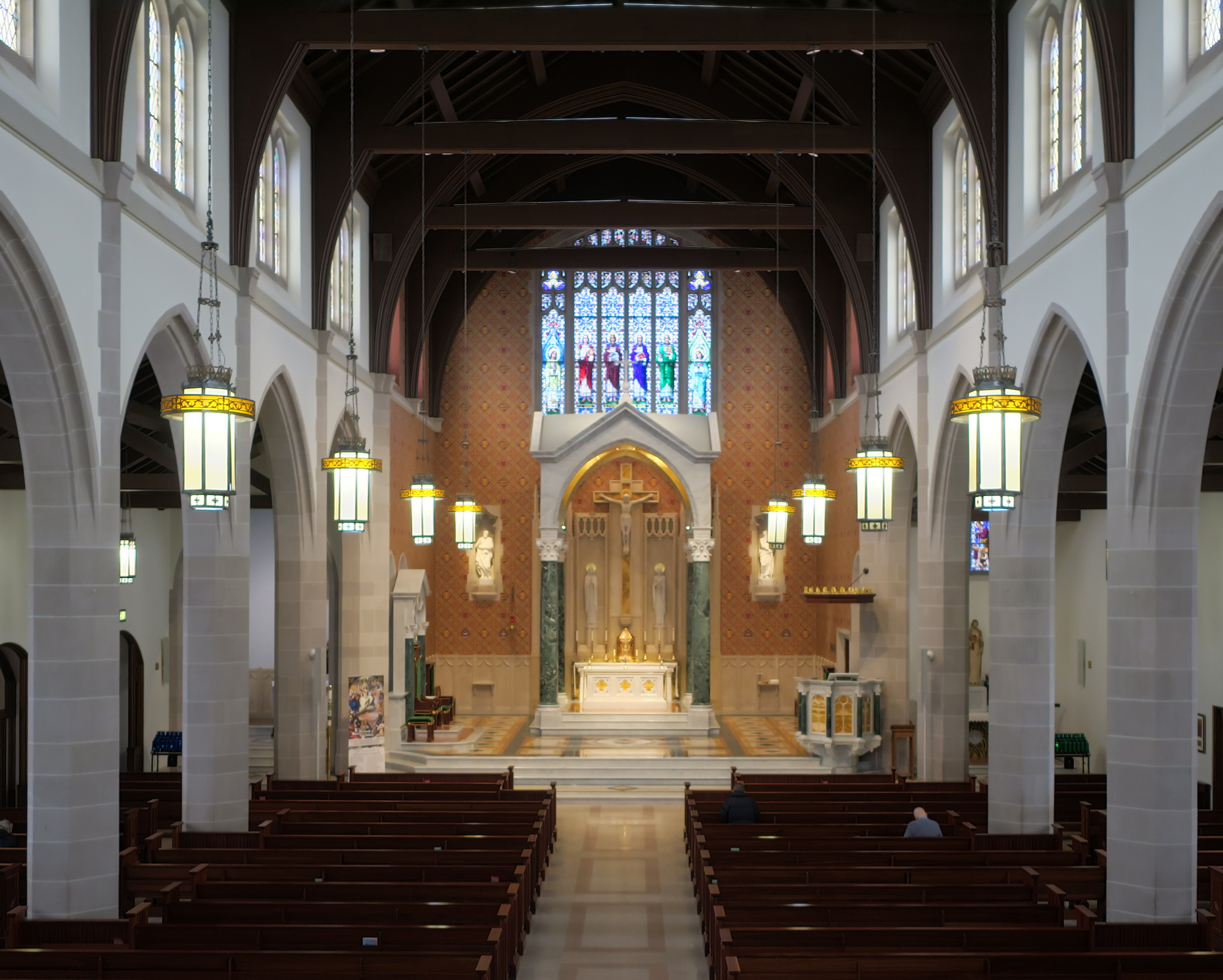
Cathedral Interior

In 1883, Father Francis O'Brien became pastor and oversaw construction of a convent, school, and rectory. He invited the Sisters of St. Joseph to Kalamazoo and aided them in establishing Borgess Hospital in 1889. They also established two Catholic prep schools, Nazareth Academy for girls and Barbour Hall for boys. O'Brien was also instrumental in establishing St. Joseph Parish, St. Michael's Polish Parish (later known as St. Mary's Parish), St. Agnes Foundling Home, and St. Anthony's Home for the Feeble Minded.

On April 12, 1923, the assistant pastor, Rev. Charles Dillon, shot and killed the pastor, Rev. Henry O'Neill, in the rectory dining room. Dillon claimed O'Neill had mistreated him and told him to pack his things and leave several times. When that same exchange took place during dinner, Dillon got a gun and the items needed for extreme unction from his room. He returned to the dining room and shot O'Neill four times. Dillon gave the items for extreme unction to another priest who was present and called the police and confessed to the crime.

O'Neill was replaced by the Rev. John Hackett, who thought he would spend two years here but served as pastor for 30 years. He had St. Augustine High School built in 1926. The parish plant was moved from West Kalamazoo Avenue to West Michigan Avenue. In 1937, the parish became part of the newly created Diocese of Lansing. Hackett was named the Vicar General of the diocese. The grade school building was added to the high school building in 1939. Construction of the current church began in 1950 with the laying of the cornerstone on August 13. Lansing Bishop Joseph H. Albers consecrated it December 4, 1951.

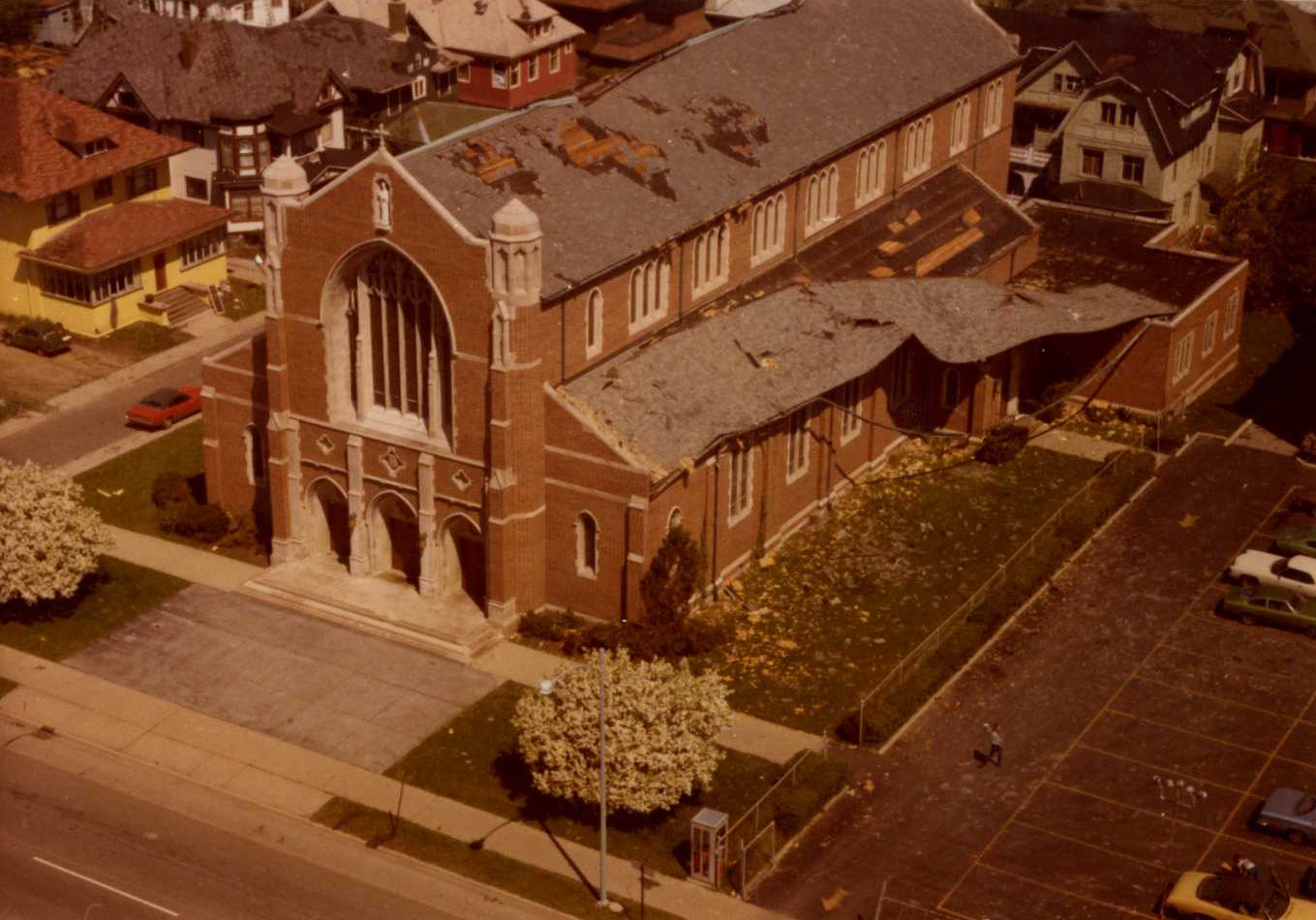
Tornado damage in 1980

Pope Paul VI created the Diocese of Kalamazoo December 19, 1970, from portions of the Diocese of Lansing and the Diocese of Grand Rapids. He selected St. Augustine as the cathedral and the Most Rev. Paul Donovan was installed as the first bishop on June 15, 1971.

In 1975 the old rectory, which had been built as a residence for lumber baron William S. Dewing in 1882, was torn down and a new one built next to the cathedral. The church and school were severely damaged in 1980 when a tornado struck the area. The cathedral was rebuilt and rededicated in 1989.

The current organ was renovated in 2002 by the Nichols & Simpson, Inc., Organbuilders and incorporated parts of the Casavant organ installed when the church opened in 1951. It has 34 stops and 42 ranks of pipes.

The entire St. Augustine campus includes an activities center, named the Fr. Crowley Cathedral Center, the St. Augustine Cathedral School, and the cathedral church itself.

== See also ==
- List of churches in the Roman Catholic Diocese of Kalamazoo
- List of Catholic cathedrals in the United States
- List of cathedrals in the United States
