= Joseph Albers =

Joseph Albers may refer to:

- Josef Albers (1888–1976), German-born American artist and educator
- Joseph H. Albers (1891–1965), American Roman Catholic bishop
