= Paul Vincent Donovan =

American prelate (1924–2011)

His Excellency, The Most Reverend Paul Vincent Donovan
- Bishop of Kalamazoo
- Church: Roman Catholic
- See: Diocese of Kalamazoo
- Installed: July 21, 1971
- Term ended: November 22, 1994
- Successor: Alfred John Markiewicz

Orders
- Ordination: May 20, 1950 by Joseph H. Albers
- Consecration: July 21, 1971 by John Dearden

Personal details
- Born: September 1, 1924 Bernard, Iowa, US
- Died: April 27, 2011 (aged 86) Wayland Township, Michigan, US
- Education: St. Gregory Seminary; Mount St. Mary's Seminary; Pontifical Lateran University
- Motto: To serve rather than be served

Paul Vincent Donovan (September 1, 1924 – April 27, 2011) was an American prelate of the Roman Catholic Church. He served as the first bishop of the new Diocese of Kalamazoo in Michigan from 1971 to 1994.

== Biography ==
=== Early life ===
Paul Donovan was born on September 1, 1924, in Bernard, Iowa. His family later move to Lansing, Michigan, where he entered St. Mary's Cathedral High School. Having decided to become a priest, Donovan began his priestly studies in 1941 at St. Joseph Seminary. In 1946, he went to Saint Gregory Seminary in Cincinnati, Ohio, receiving a Bachelor of Philosophy degree there. After finishing at St. Gregory's, Donovan entered Mount St. Mary Seminary in Norwood, Ohio to study theology.

=== Priesthood ===
Donovan was ordained a priest by Bishop Joseph Henry Albers for the Diocese of Lansing on May 20, 1950. After his ordination, Donovan was assigned as associate pastor of St. Mary Star of the Sea Parish in Jackson, Michigan. He left St. Mary in 1951 to serve as assistant to Bishop Albers for the next five years. Donovan was sent to Rome to study at the Pontifical Lateran University. earning a Licentiate of Canon Law in 1957.

After returning to Michigan, Donovan was appointed pastor of Our Lady of Fatima Parish near Jackson, serving there from 1959 to 1968. He was transferred to Flint, Michigan, in 1968 to become pastor of St. Agnes Parish.

=== Bishop of Kalamazoo ===
On June 15, 1971, Pope Paul VI named Donovan the first bishop of the newly created Diocese of Kalamazoo. He was consecrated at the Cathedral of Saint Augustine in Kalamazoo, Michigan, on July 21, 1971, by Cardinal John Dearden. The co-consecrators were Bishops Alexander M. Zaleski and Michael Green. Donovan choose as his episcopal motto: "To Serve Rather Than Be Served."

=== Retirement and legacy ===
On November 22, 1994, Pope John Paul II accepted Donovan's resignation as bishop of Kalamazoo for health reasons.

Paul Donovan died at age 86 on April 27, 2011, in Wayland Township, Michigan. He had driven into a small pond in a secluded area, and suffered a fatal heart attack after reaching the shore. He was buried at Mount Olivet Cemetery in Kalamazoo.

Catholic Church titles
Preceded by None	Bishop of Kalamazoo; 1971–1994	Succeeded by Alfred John Markiewicz
