= Paul J. Bradley =

American Roman Catholic bishop

His Excellency, The Most Reverend Paul Joseph Bradley
- Bishop Emeritus of Kalamazoo
- Diocese: Kalamazoo
- Appointed: April 6, 2009
- Installed: June 5, 2009
- Retired: May 23, 2023
- Predecessor: James Albert Murray
- Successor: Edward M. Lohse
- Previous post: Auxiliary Bishop of Pittsburgh and Titular Bishop of Afufenia (2005-2009)

Orders
- Ordination: May 1, 1971 by Vincent Leonard
- Consecration: February 2, 2005 by Donald Wuerl, Daniel DiNardo, and David Zubik

Personal details
- Born: October 18, 1945 (age 81) McKeesport, Pennsylvania, US
- Denomination: Roman Catholic Church
- Motto: Waiting in joyful hope

Styles of Paul Joseph Bradley
- Reference style: His Excellency; The Most Reverend
- Spoken style: Your Excellency
- Religious style: Bishop

Paul Joseph Bradley (born October 18, 1945) is an American prelate of the Roman Catholic Church. He served as bishop of the Diocese of Kalamazoo in Michigan from 2009 to 2023. He was an auxiliary bishop of the Diocese of Pittsburgh in Pennsylvania from 2004 to 2009.

== Biography ==
=== Early life ===
Paul Bradley was born on October 18, 1945, in McKeesport, Pennsylvania, to John and Cecilia (née Pater) Bradley. One of nine children, he has one brother and eight sisters; two sisters, Roberta and Mariella, became nuns. Bradley attended St. Meinrad Seminary in St. Meinrad, Indiana, for his high school, college and theology studies.

=== Priesthood ===
On May 1, 1971, Bradley was ordained to the priesthood for the Diocese of Pittsburgh by Bishop Vincent Leonard. He then served as parochial vicar in the following Pennsylvania parishes:

- St. Sebastian in North Hills
- St. Paul in Butler
- St. Kieran in Lawrenceville

At the same time, Bradley earned a Master of Social Work degree from the University of Pittsburgh. In 1973, Bradley became the youth director for the Northwest Deanery, working there until 1975. From 1977 to 1982, he was family life director for the Butler Deanery.

In 1983, Bradley became the director of the diocesan Office for Family Life. In 1988, he became diocesan secretary for human services, during which time he also served as co-pastor with Daniel DiNardo of Madonna del Castello Parish in Swissvale, Pennsylvania.

In 1994, Bradley became pastor of St. Sebastian Parish. He also served as dean of the Northwest Deanery from 1998 to 2001. In January 2001, Bradley was named rector of St. Paul Cathedral and pastor of the cathedral parish. On November 7, 2003, he was made general secretary and vicar general of the diocese.

=== Auxiliary Bishop of Pittsburgh ===
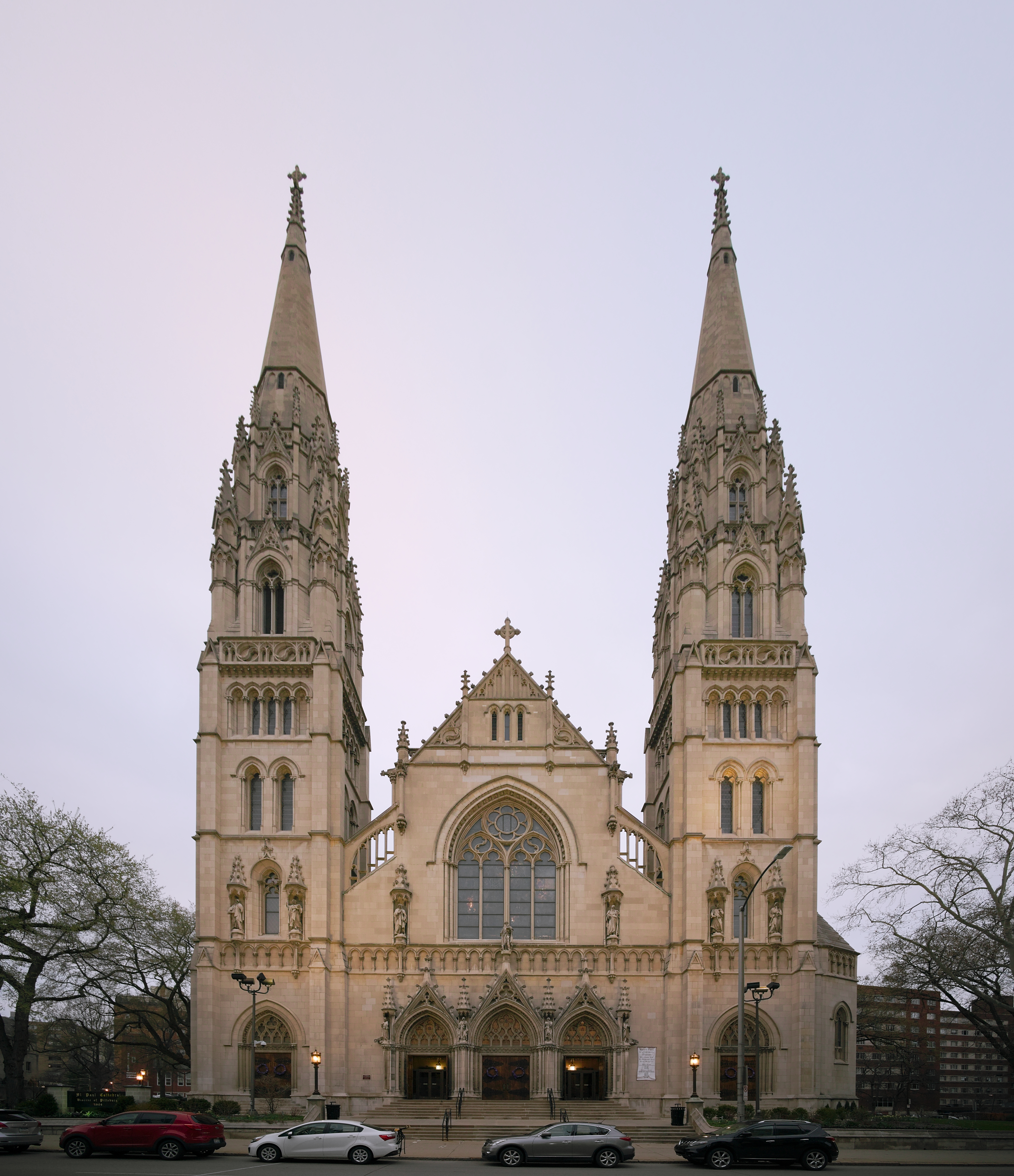
Saint Paul Cathedral, Pittsburgh, Pennsylvania (2016)

On December 16, 2004, Bradley was appointed auxiliary bishop of Pittsburgh and titular bishop of Afufenia by Pope John Paul II. He received his episcopal consecration on February 2, 2005, from Bishop Donald Wuerl, with Bishops DiNardo and David Zubik serving as co-consecrators, at St. Paul Cathedral in Pittsburgh. His selected as his episcopal motto "Waiting in Joyful Hope".

In June 2006, Bradley was named apostolic administrator of the diocese; he served until the installation of Bishop Zubik in September 2007.

=== Bishop of Kalamazoo ===
On April 6, 2009, Bradley was named the bishop of Kalamazoo. He was installed at St. Augustine Cathedral in Kalamazoo, Michigan, on June 5, 2009. In 2014, in response to a federal court ruling that the Michigan ban on same sex marriage was unconstitutional, Bradley released a statement that said: "With the stroke of a pen, the meaning of marriage, one of society's most sacred institutions and the very foundation of the family, has been redefined in our state." In 2018, Bradley proposed a ten-step plan for overhauling church policies on the reporting of sexual abuse allegations. In January 2019, assigned Archbishop Emeritus John Nienstedt, formerly of the Archdiocese of St. Paul and Minneapolis, to assist for several months at a parish in Battle Creek, Michigan. Many parishioners objected because of Nienstadt's earlier failures to report sexual abuse claims, and Nienstadt left Battle Creek after two weeks. On January 19, Bradley issued an apology: "Archbishop Nienstedt's presence has unintentionally brought about a sense of disunity, fear, and hurt to many of you during this brief period of time....As your spiritual father and shepherd, I regret that more than words can express."

=== Retirement and legacy ===
Pope Francis accepted Bradley's resignation as bishop of Kalamazoo on May 23, 2023. In September 2023, Bradley was named the administrator of the Diocese of Steubenville. Bradley was relieved of his duties as administrator in June 2024.

== See also ==
- Catholic Church hierarchy
- Catholic Church in the United States
- Historical list of the Catholic bishops of the United States
- List of Catholic bishops of the United States
- Lists of patriarchs, archbishops, and bishops

== Episcopal succession ==
Catholic Church titles
Preceded by James Albert Murray	Bishop of Kalamazoo; 2009–2023	Succeeded by Edward M. Lohse
Preceded by –	Auxiliary Bishop of Pittsburgh; 2005–2009	Succeeded by –
