= Kenneth Joseph Povish =

American prelate (1924–2003)

His Excellency, The Most Reverend Kenneth Joseph Povish
- Bishop of Lansing
- See: Diocese of Lansing
- Installed: December 11, 1975
- Term ended: November 7, 1995
- Predecessor: Alexander M. Zaleski
- Successor: Carl Frederick Mengeling
- Previous posts: Bishop of Crookston (1970 to 1975)

Orders
- Ordination: June 3, 1950 by Stephen Stanislaus Woznicki
- Consecration: September 29, 1970 by Luigi Raimondi

Personal details
- Born: April 19, 1924 Alpena, Michigan, US
- Died: September 5, 2003 (aged 79) Lansing, Michigan, US
- Education: Sacred Heart Major Seminary; Catholic University of America
- Motto: To accomplish His work"

Kenneth Joseph Povish (April 19, 1924 – September 5, 2003) was an American prelate of the Catholic Church. He served as bishop of the Diocese of Crookston in Minnesota from 1970 to 1975 and as bishop of the Diocese of Lansing in Michigan from 1975 to 1995.

== Biography ==
=== Early life ===
Kenneth Povish was born on April 19, 1924, in Alpena, Michigan, the eldest child and only son of Joseph and Elizabeth (née Yachaik) Povish. He attended the parochial school of St. Anne's Parish in Gaylord, Michigan, and graduated from Alpena High School in 1942.

Povish studied for the priesthood at St. Joseph's Seminary in Grand Rapids, Michigan, then at Sacred Heart Seminary in Detroit, where he earned a Bachelor of Arts degree in 1946. Povish completed his priestly studies at the Catholic University of America in Washington, D.C.

=== Priesthood ===
Povish was ordained a priest at the Cathedral of Mary of the Assumption in Saginaw by Bishop Stephen Woznicki for the Diocese of Saginaw on June 3, 1950. After his ordination, the diocese assigned Povish to the following Michigan parishes:

- Assistant pastor at St. Ignatius in Rogers City (1950 to 1952)
- Assistant pastor at St. Hyacinth's in Bay City (1952 to 1956)
- Pastor at St. Mary's in Port Sanilac (1956 to 1957)
- Pastor at St. Norbert's in Munger (1957 to 1960)

In 1960, Povish joined the faculty at St. Paul's Seminary in Saginaw, Michigan. He left St. Paul's in 1966 to become pastor of St. Stanislaus Parish in Bay City. The Vatican named him as a prelate of honor in 1967. In addition to his pastoral duties, Povish served as diocesan director of Catholic Charities and of religious education. He wrote a weekly column entitled "The Question Box" in The Catholic Weekly from 1954 to 1970, and was active in the Mexican apostolate, the League of Catholic Women, and the St. Vincent de Paul Society.

=== Bishop of Crookston ===
On July 28, 1970, Povish was appointed as the fifth bishop of Crookston by Pope Paul VI. He received his episcopal consecration on September 29, 1970, from Archbishop Luigi Raimondi, with Bishops Francis Reh and James Hickey serving as co-consecrators, at the Cathedral of the Immaculate Conception in Crookston Povish selected as his episcopal motto: "To Accomplish His Work" (John 4:34). During his five-year tenure, he implemented the reforms of the Second Vatican Council, establishing parish councils in each parish and a pastoral council for the diocese He also supported liturgical reform and the ecumenical movement.

=== Bishop of Lansing ===
Following the death of Bishop Alexander M. Zaleski, Paul VI named Povish as the third bishop of Lansing on October 8, 1975. His installation took place on December 11, 1975. As a member of the National Conference of Catholic Bishops (NCCB), he was chair of the Committee for Catholic Charismatic Renewal and of the Committee on Vocations. He was also a member of the NCCB Executive Board, the Committee for Laity, and the Committee for Communications.

=== Retirement and legacy ===
On November 7, 1995, Pope John Paul II accepted Povish's early retirement due to poor health as bishop of Lansing. He then served as apostolic administrator of the diocese until the installation of his successor, Bishop Carl Mengeling in January 1996.

Kenneth Povish died on September 5, 2003, from colon cancer in Lansing at age 79.

Catholic Church titles
Preceded by Lawrence Alexander Glenn	Bishop of Crookston; 1970–1975	Succeeded by Victor Hermann Balke
Preceded by Alexander M. Zaleski	Bishop of Lansing; 1975–1995	Succeeded by Carl Frederick Mengeling
