= Earl Boyea =

Catholic bishop (born 1951)

His Excellency, The Most Reverend Earl Alfred Boyea Jr.
- Bishop of Lansing
- See: Diocese of Lansing
- Appointed: February 27, 2008
- Installed: April 29, 2008
- Predecessor: Carl Frederick Mengeling
- Previous post: Auxiliary Bishop of Detroit and Titular Bishop of Siccenna (2002-2008)

Orders
- Ordination: May 20, 1978 by Joseph Leopold Imesch
- Consecration: September 13, 2002 by Adam Maida, Timothy Broglio, and Thomas Joseph Tobin

Personal details
- Born: April 10, 1951 (age 75) Pontiac, Michigan, US
- Denomination: Catholic Church
- Education: Sacred Heart Seminary High School and College (BA); Pontifical Gregorian University (STB); Wayne State University (MA); Catholic University of America (PhD)
- Motto: In manus tuas (In Your hands)

Styles of Earl Alfred Boyea
- Reference style: His Excellency; The Most Reverend
- Spoken style: Your Excellency
- Religious style: Bishop

Earl Alfred Boyea Jr. (born April 10, 1951) is an American prelate of the Roman Catholic Church. He has been serving as the bishop of the Diocese of Lansing in Michigan since 2008. He previously served as an auxiliary bishop of the Archdiocese of Detroit in Michigan from 2002 to 2008.

== Biography ==
=== Early life ===
Earl Boyea was born on April 10, 1951, in Pontiac, Michigan, the eldest of the ten children of Earl and Helen Boyea. He was raised in Waterford, Michigan, and attended Our Lady of the Lakes School in Waterford until the eighth grade.

In 1965, Boyea entered Sacred Heart Seminary High School and College in Detroit, obtaining a bachelor's degree in history. In 1973, he traveled to Rome to attend the Pontifical North American College and Pontifical Gregorian University. Boyea graduated in 1976 from the Gregorian University with a Bachelor of Sacred Theology. In 1977, he returned to Michigan to serve as a deacon at St. Benedict Parish in Pontiac.

=== Priesthood ===
On May 20, 1978, Boyea was ordained to the priesthood for the Archdiocese of Detroit by Bishop Joseph Leopold Imesch at St. Benedict Church in Waterford, Michigan. After his 1978 ordination, the archdiocese assigned Boyea as associate pastor of St. Michael the Archangel Parish in Monroe, Michigan. In 1979, Boyea returned to the Gregorian University, obtaining his Licentiate of Sacred Theology in 1980, with a thesis entitled Christology in Galatians.

After Boyea came back to Michigan in 1980, the archdiocese assigned him as associate pastor of St. Timothy Parish in Trenton, Michigan. In 1984, he earned a Master of Arts in American history from Wayne State University in Detroit with a thesis entitled "John Samuel Foley, Third Bishop of Detroit: His Ecclesiastical Conflicts in the Diocese of Detroit, 1888–1900".

In 1986, Boyea was named temporary administrator of St. Christine Parish in Detroit. Boyea obtained a Doctor of Church History from Catholic University of America in Washington, D.C. in 1987. In 1987, he was posted as a weekend assistant at St. Joseph Parish in Lake Orion, Michigan, then transferred in 1988 to Holy Family Parish in Novi, Michigan. From 1987 to 2000, Boyea taught church history and scripture at Sacred Heart Major Seminary, becoming dean of studies in 1990. Also in 1988, Boyea served as the chaplain of Camp Sancta Maria, a Catholic boys' summer camp in Gaylord, Michigan.

In 1990, Boyea was transferred to Sacred Heart Parish in Auburn Hills, Michigan. He served on the presbyteral council from 1990 to 1991 and on the board of Madonna University in Livonia, Michigan, from 1994 to 2000. Boyea left Camp Sancta Maria and Sacred Heart Parish in 1999. On January 18, 2000, he was elevated by the Vatican to monsignor. In 2001, Boyea became a weekend assistant at St. Mary Parish in Columbus, Ohio, while serving as the rector-president and a professor at the Pontifical College Josephinum in Columbus.

Boyea was editor of the following documents:

- the North Central Association Self-Study Report in 1994
- the United States Catholic Conference Self-Study Report in 1995
- the Association of Theological Schools Self-Study Report in 1996
- the National Conference of Catholic Bishops' Seminary Visitation Report in 1998

=== Auxiliary Bishop of Detroit ===
On July 22, 2002, Boyea was appointed as an auxiliary bishop of Detroit and titular bishop of Siccenna by Pope John Paul II. On September 13, 2002, he received his episcopal consecration from Cardinal Adam Maida, with Archbishop Timothy P. Broglio and Bishop Thomas Joseph Tobin serving as co-consecrators. Boyea served as regional bishop for the south region of the archdiocese. He then spent tours serving the northeast region.

=== Bishop of Lansing ===
On February 27, 2008, Pope Benedict XVI named Boyea as the fifth bishop of Lansing, with his installation on April 29, 2008. Within the United States Conference of Catholic Bishops (USCCB), Boyea sits on the Committee on Clergy, Consecrated Life and Vocations, having formerly sat on the Committee on Boundaries of Dioceses and Provinces and on Priestly Formation and the Committee on Selection of Bishops. He also belongs to the Catholic Biblical Association, and the American Catholic Historical Association.

In September 2019, the diocese released a list of 17 priests who were credibly accused of sexual abuse of minors or young adults. Boyea made this statement:

The primary intended audience of this list are victims of abuse: to encourage presently unknown victims to come forward; to help victims expose their abusers; and to assist victims in finding healing – it is also hoped that this information will assist all to ensure that such abuse never happens again.

In October 2019, the diocese released a special investigative report that reported its failure in 1990 to investigate a sexual assault by Reverend Pat Egan against a young man. Boyea made this statement:

I repeat publicly now what I have said privately and personally to the victim in question: I am deeply sorry for the Diocese’s past failure and all should know that the allegation would have been handled differently today.

In 2021, the USCCB elected Boyea as chair of the Clergy, Consecrated Life and Vocations Committee.

== See also ==
- Catholic Church hierarchy
- Catholic Church in the United States
- Historical list of the Catholic bishops of the United States
- List of Catholic bishops of the United States
- Lists of patriarchs, archbishops, and bishops

== Episcopal succession ==
Catholic Church titles
Preceded by Carl Frederick Mengeling	Bishop of Lansing; 2008–present	Succeeded by Incumbent
