= Edward M. Lohse =

American Roman Catholic bishop

His Excellency, The Most Reverend Edward Mark Lohse
- Bishop of Kalamazoo
- Diocese: Kalamazoo
- Appointed: May 23, 2023
- Installed: July 25, 2023
- Predecessor: Paul J. Bradley
- Other post: Member of the Supreme Tribunal of the Apostolic Signatura (2026–present)
- Previous posts: Adjunct professor, Gannon University; 2001 - 2002 Assistant Chancellor, Diocese of Erie; 2002 - 2007 Vice-Chancellor, Diocese of Erie; 2007 - 2010 Chancellor, Diocese of Erie; 2010 - 2015 Official, Congregation for the Clergy; 2011 - 2015 Adjunct professor, Pontifical North American College; 2016 - 2017 Episcopal Vicar for Canonical Services, Diocese of Erie; 2017 - 2023 Vicar General, Moderator of the Curia, and Director of the Office for the Protection of Children and Youth, Diocese of Erie

Orders
- Ordination: April 21, 1989 by Michael Joseph Murphy
- Consecration: July 25, 2023 by Allen Vigneron, Paul J. Bradley, and Lawrence T. Persico

Personal details
- Born: November 23, 1961 (age 64) McKean, Pennsylvania, US
- Parents: Edward and Ida (née Dedrick) Lohse
- Education: Gannon University; St. Mark Seminary; St. Vincent Seminary; Pontifical Gregorian University
- Motto: Illum oportet crescere (He must grow)

Styles of Edward Mark Lohse
- Reference style: His Excellency; The Most Reverend
- Spoken style: Your Excellency
- Religious style: Bishop

Edward Mark Lohse (born November 23, 1961) is an American Catholic prelate who has served as bishop of Kalamazoo in Michigan since 2023. He was named apostolic administrator of the Diocese of Steubenville in Ohio in 2024.

== Biography ==
=== Early life ===
Edward Lohse was born on November 23, 1961, in McKean, Pennsylvania, the sixth of seven children of Edward and Ida (née Dedrick) Lohse. Edward Lohse attended elementary school at Our Lady of Peace School in Millcreek Township, Pennsylvania. He graduated in 1980 from Cathedral Preparatory School in Erie, Pennsylvania.

Lohse graduated from Gannon University in Erie in 1984 with a Bachelor of Arts in history, having begun college seminary formation at St. Mark Seminary in Erie. He completed graduate studies at Saint Vincent Seminary and earned a Master of Divinity in 1988. He was ordained to the diaconate on October 22, 1988.

=== Priesthood ===
Lohse was ordained a priest for the Diocese of Erie by Bishop Michael Joseph Murphy on April 21, 1989, at St. Peter Cathedral in Erie.

After his 1989 ordination, the diocese assigned Lohse as parochial vicar for one year at St. Thomas the Apostle Church in Corry, Pennsylvania. They also placed him as a campus minister and teacher of theology, German and Latin at Central Catholic High School in Dubois, Pennsylvania. In 1993, Lohse was appointed as an adjunct professor at Gannon. Bishop Donald Walter Trautman named Lohse in 1995 as director of the vocations office. He was named vice chancellor of the diocese by Trautman in 2001 and chancellor in 2007. Lohse received a Doctor of Divinity in 2010 from Saint Vincent Seminary in Latrobe, Pennsylvania, and he served on the St. Vincent Seminary Board of Regents from 2003 to 2010.

In 2010, Lohse worked at the Dicastery for the Clergy at the Vatican. He was also an adjunct faculty member at the Pontifical North American College. Lohse received his Doctor of Canon Law from the Pontifical Gregorian University in Rome in 2015. That same year, Lohse was granted the title of monsignor by Pope Francis.

When Lohse returned to Erie in 2016, Bishop Lawrence Persico appointed him as episcopal vicar for canonical services. Lohse was moved in 2017 to the positions of vicar general and moderator of the curia. Persico also named him director of the Office for the Protection of Children and Youth.

=== Episcopacy ===
Pope Francis appointed Lohse as bishop of Kalamazoo on May 23, 2023. He was consecrated a bishop by Archbishop Allen Vigneron on July 25, 2023, with Bishops Paul J. Bradley and Persico serving as co-consecrators.

In June 2024, Lohse was named administrator of the Diocese of Steubenville.

== See also ==
- Catholic Church hierarchy
- Catholic Church in the United States
- Historical list of the Catholic bishops of the United States
- List of Catholic bishops of the United States
- Lists of patriarchs, archbishops, and bishops

Catholic Church titles
Preceded by Paul J. Bradley	Bishop of Kalamazoo; 2023–present	Succeeded by Incumbent
