= William F. J. Ryan =

American heraldist (1903–1981)

- Born: January 12, 1903; Newark, New Jersey, U.S.
- Died: July 19, 1981 (aged 78); Hyannis, Massachusetts, U.S.
- Education: Fordham University
- Occupation: Heraldist
- Organization: Ryan-West Banknote Company

William Francis James Ryan (January 12, 1903 – July 19, 1981) was an American designer of ecclesiastical heraldry. Ryan created over 1,000 coats of arms for cardinals, bishops, dioceses, colleges, and other institutions.

== Biography ==
Ryan was born in Newark, New Jersey on January 12, 1903, to James and Anna Ryan. He attended Xavier High School in New York City, graduating in 1921. Following that, he attended Fordham College, where he graduated from in 1925. He conducted post-graduate studies at New York University.

Ryan began his career in engraving with Broun-Green Company in New York City. He founded the Ryan-West Banknote Company in 1938 with his father. Ryan first became interested in heraldry in the 1930s after meeting Pierre de Chaignon la Rose. Before his death, la Rose created most of the ecclesiastical heraldry in the United States. Ryan began formally designing coats of arms in 1940, first designing the arms of Bishop Laurence Julius FitzSimon of Amarillo, Texas. He was a member of the Académie internationale d'Héraldique, and had a personal library of 500 volumes on heraldry. By 1965, half of the business of the Ryan-West Banknote Company was creating heraldry.

By 1968, he had designed more than 1,000 coats of arms for prelates, dioceses, seminaries, and colleges. He designed arms for most of the Catholic hierarchy in the United States. Prelates for whom he designed included Cardinal John Carberry, Cardinal John Cody, Cardinal Patrick O'Boyle, Cardinal John Krol, and Bishop James P. Shannon. Dioceses he created arms for included Washington, Atlanta, Savannah, Norwich, and Bridgeport. Colleges he designed arms for include the University of St. Thomas, Seton Hall University, Merrimack College, St. Mark Seminary, and Niagara University Other institutions include America Magazine.

Ryan married Alice Killigrew on January 29, 1934. With Alice, he had a son, William, and two daughters, Alice and Virginia. He moved to Massachusetts in 1973. Ryan died on July 19, 1981, in Hyannis, Massachusetts at the age of 78.
