= St. Thomas More Academy (Burton, Michigan) =

Location
- 6456 East Bristol Road; Burton, (Genesee County), Michigan 48519
- 42°58′31″N 83°34′36″W

Information
- Religious affiliation: Roman Catholic
- Established: 1989
- Authority: Diocese of Lansing
- Grades: Kindergarten–12
- Accreditation: North Central Association of Colleges and Schools
- Website: http://www.stma-mi.org/

Saint Thomas More Academy is a private, Roman Catholic school in Burton, Michigan. It is located in the Roman Catholic Diocese of Lansing.

== Background ==
St. Thomas More Academy was established in 1989.
