= Carl Frederick Mengeling =

American Roman Catholic prelate (1930–2025)

His Excellency. The Most Reverend Carl Frederick Mengeling S.T.D.
- Bishop of Lansing
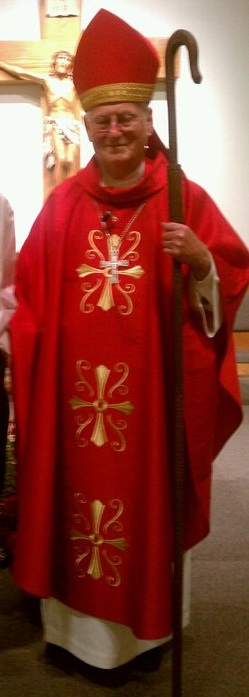
- Mengeling in 2011
- Church: Roman Catholic
- Archdiocese: Detroit
- See: Lansing
- Appointed: November 7, 1995
- Installed: January 25, 1996
- Retired: February 27, 2008
- Predecessor: Kenneth Joseph Povish
- Successor: Earl Boyea

Orders
- Ordination: May 25, 1957 by Andrew Gregory Grutka
- Consecration: January 25, 1996 by Adam Maida, Kenneth Joseph Povish, and Dale Joseph Melczek

Personal details
- Born: October 22, 1930 Hammond, Indiana, U.S.
- Died: July 1, 2025 (aged 94) Lansing, Michigan, U.S.
- Parents: Carl and Augusta (née Huke) Mengeling
- Education: Saint Meinrad Seminary and School of Theology; Pontifical University of Saint Thomas Aquinas; Alphonsian Academy
- Motto: He must increase

Styles of Carl Frederick Mengeling
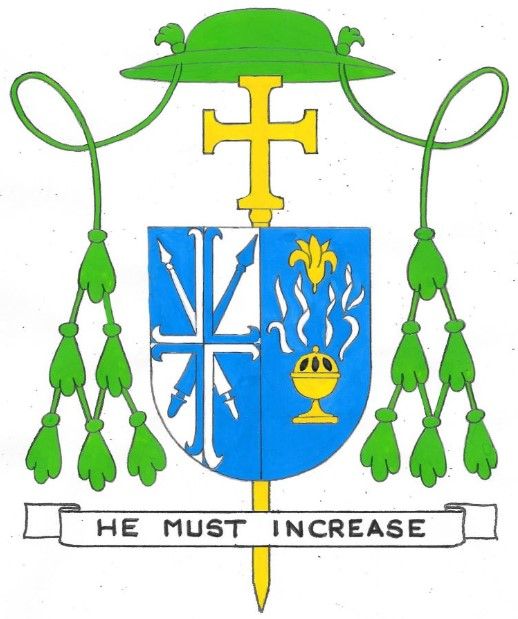
- Reference style: His Excellency; The Most Reverend
- Spoken style: Your Excellency
- Religious style: Bishop

Carl Frederick Mengeling (October 22, 1930 – July 1, 2025) was an American prelate of the Roman Catholic Church. He served as bishop of the Diocese of Lansing in Michigan from 1996 to 2008.

== Biography ==
Mengeling was born on October 22, 1930, in Hammond, Indiana, to Carl H. and Augusta Huke Mengeling. Raised in a Lutheran family, Mengeling converted to Catholicism at age nine. He attended St. Mary Elementary School in Griffith, Indiana, and graduated from Griffith High School in 1948. Mengeling then entered St. Meinrad College and Seminary in Saint Meinrad, Indiana.

=== Priesthood ===
On May 25, 1957, Mengeling was ordained to the priesthood for the new Diocese of Gary by Bishop Andrew Grutka at the Cathedral of the Holy Angels in Gary, Indiana. After his ordination, Mengeling became associate pastor of St. Mark's Parish in Gary. In 1961, Mengeling entered the Pontifical University of St. Thomas Aquinas in Rome, obtaining his Licentiate of Sacred Theology. He also attended the Alphonsian Academy in Rome, earning a Doctor of Sacred Theology degree. Mengeling acted as a page during some sessions of the Second Vatican Council.

After returning to Indiana in 1964, Mengeling began teaching at Bishop Noll High School in Hammond, Indiana, St. Joseph Calumet College in East Chicago, Indiana, and St. Procopius Seminary in Lisle, Illinois. In 1968, Mengeling became pastor of All Saints Parish in Hammond, Indiana, then in 1970 was transferred to Holy Name Parish in Cedar Lake, Indiana. In 1971, Mengeling was named pastor of Nativity of Our Savior Parish in Portage, Indiana, serving there until 1985.

Raised by the Vatican to the title of monsignor in June 1984, Mengeling chaired the Diocesan Worship Commission and the Vocations Committee in Gary. He also founded the diocesan Institute of Religion and chaired it for 14 years. Mengeling also served on the Presbyteral Council, the Ecumenical Commission and the Permanent Diaconate Formation team. In 1985, Mengeling was appointed pastor of St. Thomas More Parish in Munster, Indiana.

=== Bishop of Lansing ===
On November 7, 1995, Pope John Paul II appointed Mengeling as the fourth bishop of Lansing, He received his episcopal consecration on January 25, 1996, from Cardinal Adam Maida, with Bishops Kenneth Povish and Dale Melczek serving as co-consecrators, in St. Mary Cathedral in Lansing, Michigan. Mengeling selected as his episcopal motto: "He must increase", from John 3:30. During his tenure, Mengeling opened several parochial schools and churches. He also involved himself with the activities of Hispanic, Vietnamese, and African-American Catholics in his diocese.

In 2002, Mengeling removed from ministry Reverend Vincent DeLorenzo from a Flint, Michigan parish. A young man had accused DeLorenzo of sexually abusing him when he was a minor and DeLorenzo had admitted his guilt. The diocese forwarded the accusation to the Genesee County Michigan district attorney and asked the Vatican to defrock DeLorenzo. In 2003, In response to sexual misconduct scandals among the clergy, Mengeling instituted the Virtus program and visited retreats for victims of sexual abuse. Also in 2003, he issued a statement on the war in Iraq, calling for "...a swift end to hostilities and commitment to reconciliation."

=== Retirement and legacy ===
Pope Benedict XVI accepted Mengeling's retirement as bishop of Lansing on February 27, 2008. He was succeeded by Bishop Earl Boyea. Mengeling died in the early hours of July 1, 2025, in Mother Teresa House for the Care of the Terminally Ill in Lansing. He was 94.

== See also ==
- Catholic Church hierarchy
- Catholic Church in the United States
- Historical list of the Catholic bishops of the United States
- List of Catholic bishops of the United States
- Lists of patriarchs, archbishops, and bishops

== Episcopal succession ==
Catholic Church titles
Preceded by Kenneth Joseph Povish	Bishop of Lansing; 1996–2008	Succeeded by Earl Boyea
