= Afufenia =

Roman-era city in Byzacena

African Proconsularis

Afufenia (also called Afufeniensis) was a Roman era city in the province of Byzacena. Its exact location is unknown, but it would have been situated in central Tunisia.

Afufenia was also the seat of an ancient Catholic bishopric. and was mentioned by Optatus. One bishop is known from Afufenia, Mansueto, who was among the Catholic bishops summoned to Carthage in 484 by the Vandal king Huneric and then exiled. According to Mesnage it would be the same Mansueto remembered by Vetus Romanum Martyrology as of September 6. Today Afufenia survives as a titular bishopric, with the current bishop being Raúl Alfonso Carrillo Martínez, Vicar Apostolic of Puerto Gaitán. He replaced Paul J. Bradley in 2004.
