= Diocese of Lansing =

Latin Catholic jurisdiction in the US

Coordinates: 42°44′08″N 84°33′22″W

Diocese of Lansing Diœcesis Lansingensis
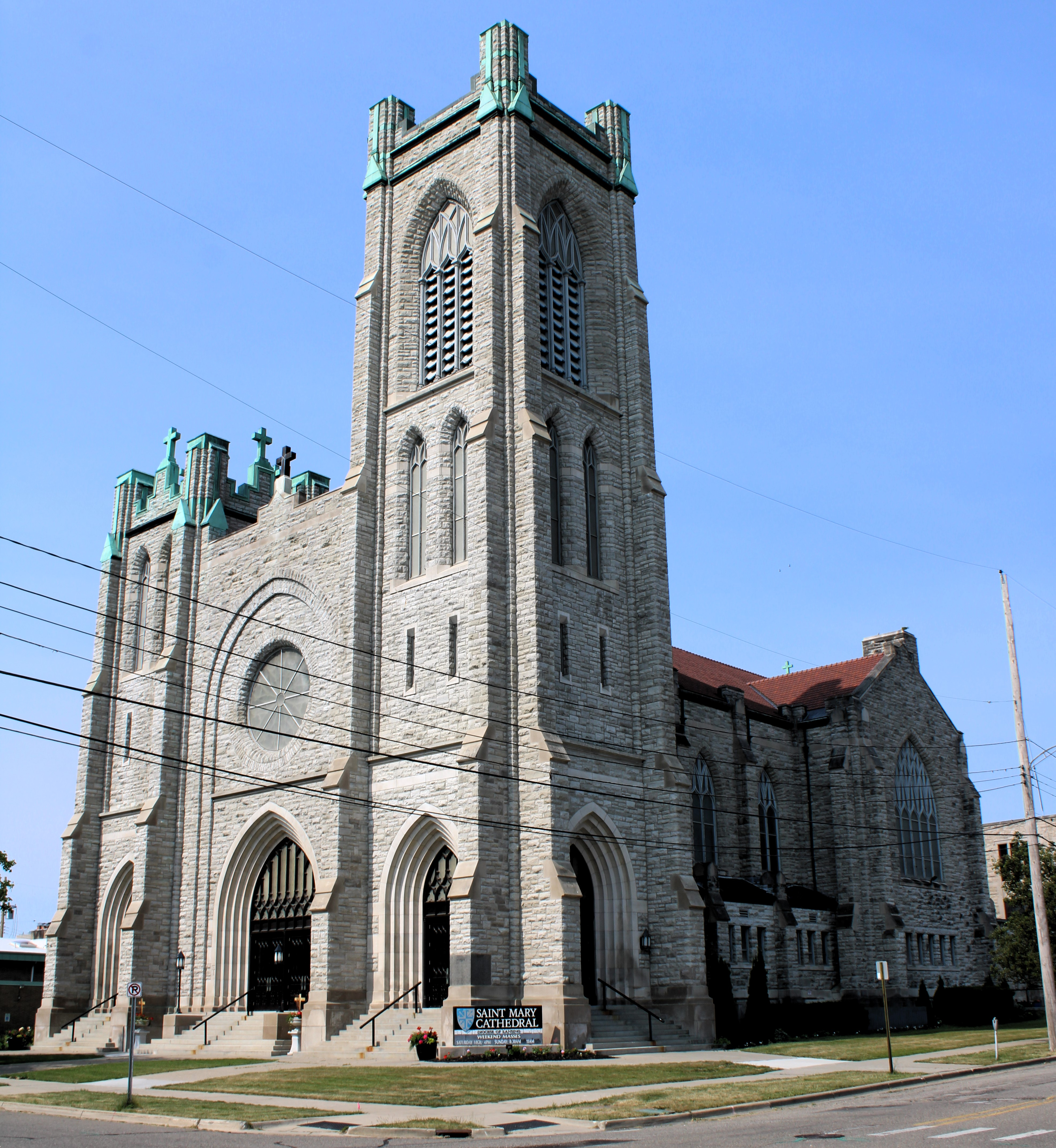
- St. Mary's Cathedral

- Coat of arms

Location
- Country: United States
- Territory: Counties of Clinton, Eaton, Genesee, Hillsdale, Ingham, Jackson, Lenawee, Livingston, Shiawassee, and Washtenaw
- Ecclesiastical province: Detroit

Statistics
- Area: 6,218 sq mi (16,100 km^{2})
- Population: Total; Catholics: (as of 2023); 1,819,576; 180,300 (9.9%)
- Parishes: 72

Information
- Denomination: Catholic Church
- Sui iuris church: Latin Church
- Rite: Roman Rite
- Established: May 22, 1937 (89 years ago)
- Cathedral: St. Mary Cathedral
- Patron saint: Blessed Virgin Mary

Current leadership
- Pope: Leo XIV
- Bishop: Earl Boyea
- Metropolitan Archbishop: Edward Weisenburger

Map
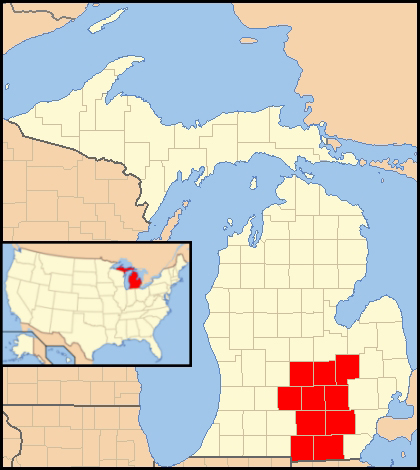

Website
- dioceseoflansing.org

The Diocese of Lansing (Latin: Diœcesis Lansingensis) is a diocese of the Catholic Church located in the south-central portion of Michigan in the United States. It is a suffragan diocese of the Archdiocese of Detroit. The see's mother church is St. Mary's Cathedral in Lansing. The bishop is Earl Boyea.

== Territory ==
The Diocese of Lansing encompasses an area of 6,218 square miles (16,100 km^{2}) including the counties of Clinton, Eaton, Genesee, Hillsdale, Ingham, Jackson, Lenawee, Livingston, Shiawassee and Washtenaw.

== History ==
=== 1700 to 1900 ===
During the 17th century, present-day Michigan was part of the French colony of New France. For Catholics, the Diocese of Quebec had jurisdiction over the region. In 1763, after the end of the French-Indian War, the Michigan area became part of the British Province of Quebec, forbidden from settlement by American colonists. After the American Revolution end in 1783, the Michigan region became part of the new United States. In 1789, the Vatican erected the Diocese of Baltimore, with jurisdiction over the entire country.

In 1808, Pope Pius VII erected the Diocese of Bardstown in Kentucky, with jurisdiction over the new Michigan Territory. In 1821, the pope erected the Diocese of Cincinnati, taking the Michigan Territory from the Diocese of Bardstown. Pope Gregory XVI formed the Diocese of Detroit in 1833, covering the entire Michigan Territory. The Lansing area would be part of the Diocese of Detroit, followed by the Archdiocese of Detroit, for the next 104 years.

In Ann Arbor, St. Thomas the Apostle Church was dedicated in 1845, the first Catholic church in that community. The first Catholic church in Flint, St. Michael's, was dedicated in 1848. In 1864, the first St. Mary Church opened in Lansing, the first there.St. Thomas the Apostle School opened in Ann Arbor in 1868. It was the first Catholic school in Ann Arbor and in the future diocese.

=== 1900 to 1950 ===
In 1911, a contingent of the Sisters of Mercy came to Ann Arbor from Dubuque, Iowa, to open a community hospital. St. Joseph's Sanitarium opened in 1911. Today it is St. Joseph Mercy Ann Arbor. In Jackson, the St. Joseph Home for Boys, an orphanage, was opened by the Felician Sisters in 1912. Its successor today is the Felician Children's Center.

The second St. Mary's Church in Lansing was dedicated in 1913.During the 1910s, Bishop Michael J. Gallagher of Detroit asked the Sisters of St. Joseph to open a hospital in Flint.In 1919, the Adrian Dominican Sisters opened St. Joseph's College for women in Adrian. It later became Siena Heights University.

St. Joseph Hospital opened in Flint 1920. Today it is part of the Hamilton Community Health Network.St. Lawrence Hospital opened in Lansing in 1924. It was named after the industrialist Lawrence Price, who donated $100,000 towards its construction.Today it is part of the UM Health-Sparrow Health System campus.

Pope Pius XI created the Diocese of Lansing May 22, 1937, removing its territory from the Archdiocese of Detroit. He named Auxiliary Bishop Joseph H. Albers of Cincinnati as the first bishop of Lansing that same year.In 1938, the rectory of St. Mary Cathedral caught fire. Albers, his lungs weakened from his exposure to mustard gas during World War I, collapsed at the scene and had to be rescued by firefighters. In 1940, Albers moved into Meadowvue in Eaton Rapids, his episcopal residence.

During Albers's episcopacy, the diocese built 38 parishes, 42 elementary schools and two high schools. This earned Albers the appellation "The Builder". Albers enjoyed a special devotion to St. Joseph; one of the new parishes was named for him.

=== 1950 to 2000 ===
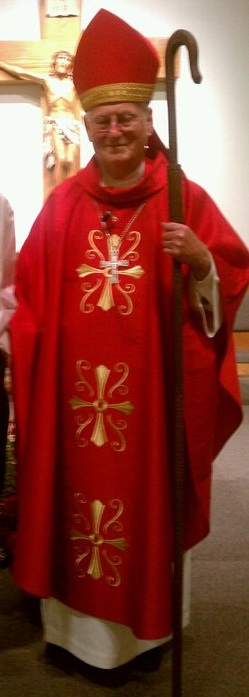
Bishop Mengeling (2011)

The Saint Vincent DePaul Society opened the St. Vincent Home for Children in Lansing in 1952. It served families who needed a temporary residence for their children. Today it is part of Catholic Charities for the diocese.

In 1954, the diocesan newsletter Catholic Weekly, Lansing began publication. Albers was instrumental in its startup.That same year, Franciscan friars with the Custody of St. John Capistran from New Jersey purchased a property in DeWitt to build a retreat house. Pope Paul VI named Auxiliary Bishop Alexander M. Zaleski of the Diocese of Pittsburgh as coadjutor bishop in Lansing in 1964 to assist Albers.

When Albers died in 1965, Zaleski automatically succeeded him as bishop of Lansing. Zaleski died in 1975. The next Bishop of Lansing was Bishop Kenneth Joseph Povish of the Diocese of Crookston, appointed in 1970. In July 1971, Pope Paul VI separated territory from the diocese to form the new Diocese of Kalamazoo.Facing declining numbers, the Franciscan sold their retreat center in DeWitt to the diocese in 1988.

Povish retired as bishop of Lansing in 1995 due to poor health. Carl Mengeling from the Diocese of Gary was appointed bishop of Lansing that same year by Pope John Paul II. During his tenure, Mengeling opened several parochial schools and churches. He also promoted the activities of Hispanic, Vietnamese, and African-American Catholics in the diocese.

=== 2000 to present ===
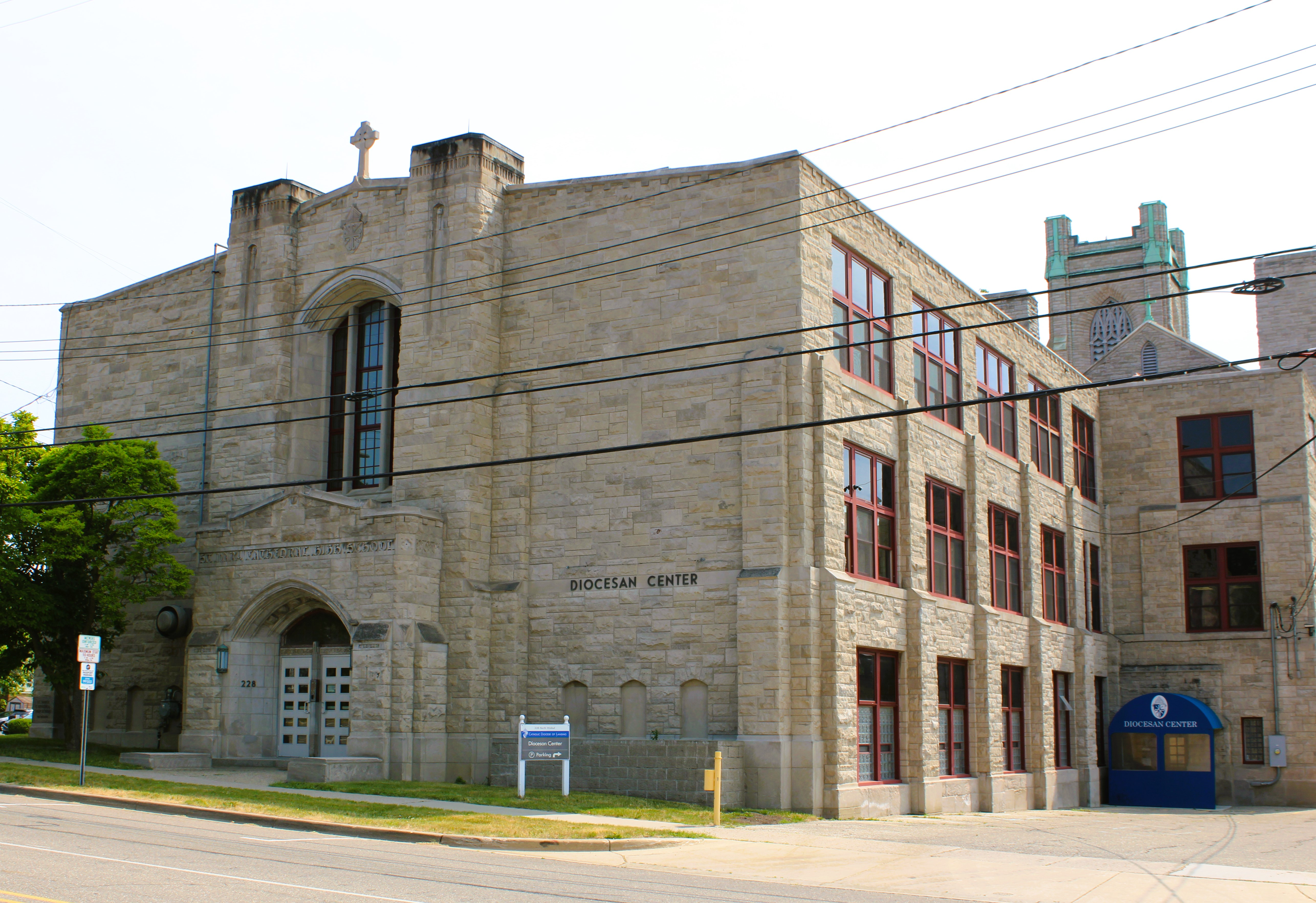
Diocesan Center, Lansing, Michigan (2023)

Mengeling retired as bishop of Lansing in 2008. Pope Benedict XVI in 2008 appointed Auxiliary Bishop Earl Boyea of Detroit as the next bishop of Lansing. In 2017, Jonathan Wehrle, pastor of St. Martha Parish in Okemos, was arrested and charged with stealing $5 million from his parish. Werhle owned an 11-acre estate in Willimaston; prosecutors said he spent $45,000 of the embezzled funds on an indoor pool and over $134,000 on landscaping. Before he could come to trial, Wherhle died in 2020.

In January 2021, the diocese instituted a new policy for schools, parishes, and charities regarding the biological sex of students, parishioners and others. This policy included direction on the use of pronouns, along with requirements that bathrooms and sports be segregated according to biological sex. The policy also required school officials to avoid participating in the administration of hormonal treatment of students that was designed to alter their sexual characteristics.

Siena Heights University in June 2025 announced that it was closing at the end of the 2025-2026 academic year. As of 2026, Boyea is the current bishop of Lansing, with plans of him retiring in 2026.

=== Sex abuse cases ===
The Diocese of Lansing paid a $225,000 settlement in August 2010 to a man who said he was sexually assaulted by John Slowey at St. Vincent Home in Lansing in 1955. That same month, the diocese announced that John Martin of Laingsburg had molested at least six boys during the 1950s and 1960s.

Vincent DeLorenzo, a priest from Flint, was charged by the Michigan Department of Attorney General in May 2019 with six counts of first- and second-degree sexual misconduct. Eight victims had accused him of sexual abuse. In 2019, the diocese requested that the Vatican laicize DeLorenzo. In April 2023, DeLorenzo pleaded guilty to one count of sexual assault. His victim was a five-year-old boy whom he assaulted after officiating at a family funeral. DeLorenzo was sentenced to one year in prison and five years of probation.

In July 2021, the diocese announced that it had determined two sexual abuse allegations against the late Bishop James Sullivan from the Diocese of Fargo to be credible. Two men had accused Sullivan of inappropriate behavior with them during when they were boys in the 1960s, when Sullivan was a priest in the Diocese of Lansing. Sullivan later served as an auxiliary bishop in Lansing. The diocese in September 2019 published a list of 17 clergy with credible accusations of sexual abuse of minors dating back to 1937. The list was updated in 2022.

In September 2020, Joseph Comperchio, a former teacher at St. John Catholic School in Jackson, was arrested in Fort Myers, Florida. He was charged in Michigan with two counts of first-degree criminal sexual conduct and four counts of second-degree criminal sexual conduct. Comperchio committed these acts at the school between 1974 and 1977. He was convicted and sentenced in 2021 to 12 to 30 years in prison.

Michigan Attorney General Dana Nessel released a report in December 2024 on “allegations of sexual abuse and other sexual misconduct, including grooming and misuse of authority against minors and adults” in the Diocese of Lansing. The report named two bishops and 56 clergy and members of religious orders, with a total of 150 allegations. Only one person on that list, a deacon, was still in active ministry.

== Bishops ==
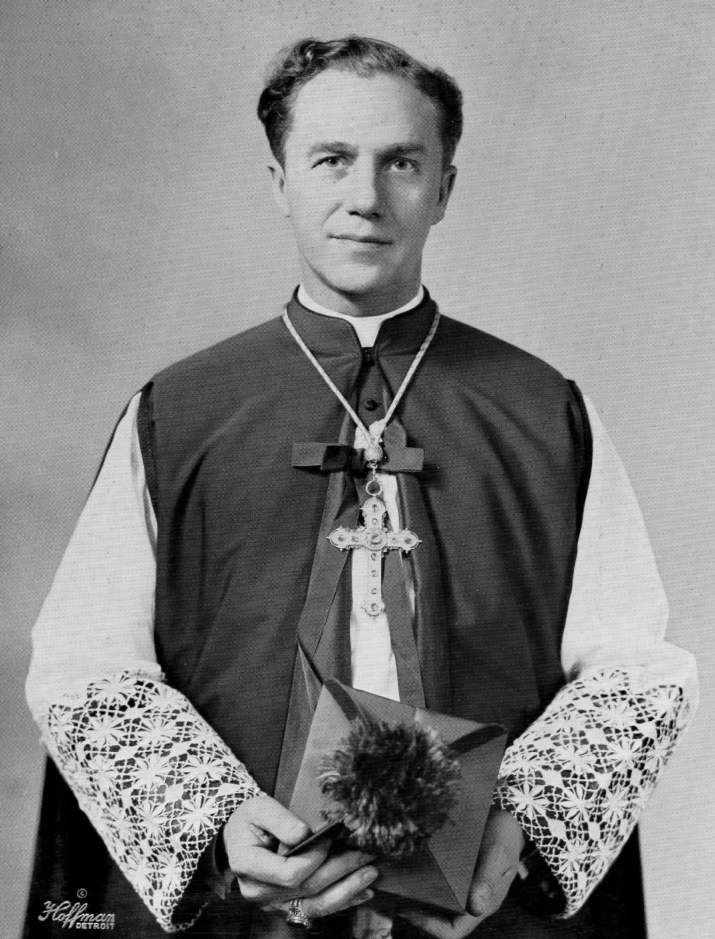
Bishop Zaleski (1956)

=== Bishops of Lansing ===
1. Joseph H. Albers (1937– 1965)
2. Alexander M. Zaleski (1965–1975)
3. Kenneth Joseph Povish (1975–1995)
4. Carl Frederick Mengeling (1995–2008)
5. Earl Boyea (2008–present)

=== Auxiliary Bishops ===
- Michael Joseph Green (1962–1967), appointed Bishop of Reno
- James Stephen Sullivan (1972–1985), appointed Bishop of Fargo

=== Other diocesan priests who became bishops ===
- Paul Vincent Donovan, appointed Bishop of Kalamazoo in 1971
- James Albert Murray, appointed Bishop of Kalamazoo in 1997
- Steven John Raica, appointed Bishop of Gaylord from 2014 to 2020, appointed Bishop of Birmingham in 2020
- Gerald Lee Vincke, appointed Bishop of Salina in 2018

== Education ==
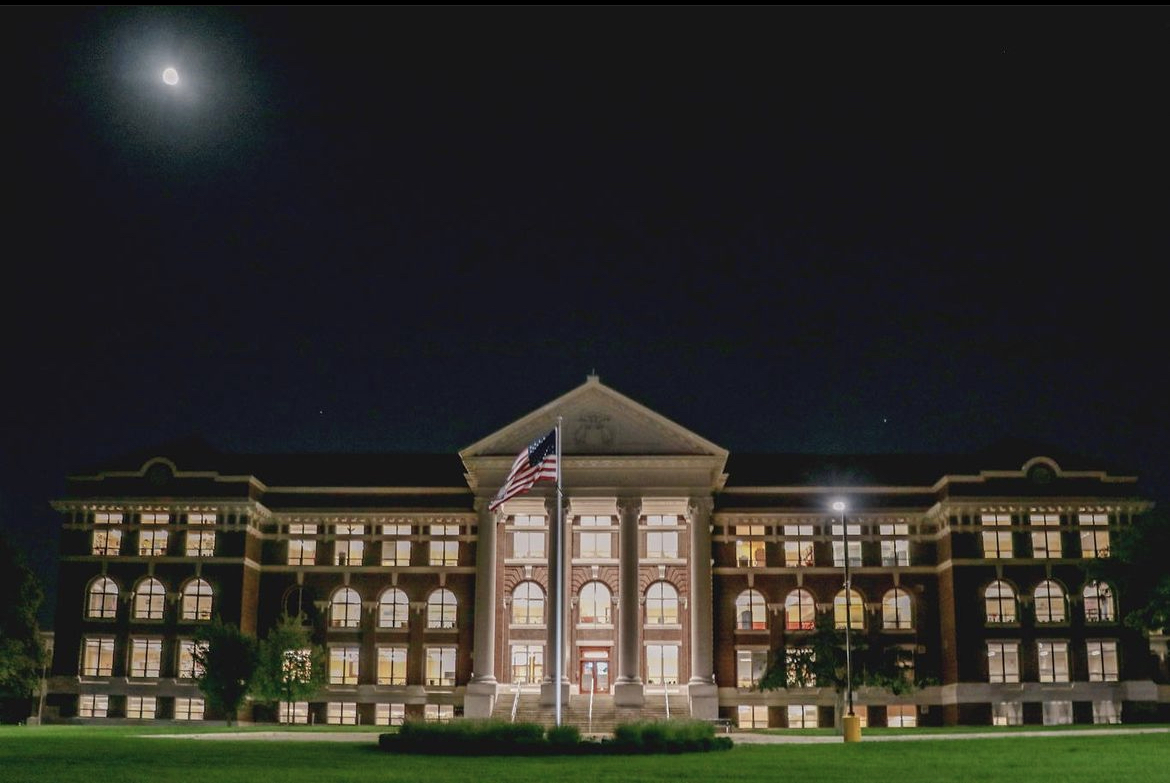
Powers Catholic High School (2023)

As of 2026, the Diocese of Lansing had four high schools and 32 elementary schools, with a total student enrollment of approximately 8,300.St. Thomas More Academy is an independent school.

=== High schools ===
- Father Gabriel Richard High School – Ann Arbor
- Lansing Catholic High School – Lansing
- Lumen Christi Catholic High School – Jackson
- Powers Catholic High School – Flint
- St. Thomas More Academy – Burton

== Media ==
The Diocese of Lansing owns the publisher Faith Catholic, which publishes Catholic magazines for dioceses and organizations. Faith Catholic also operates the website MassTimes.org.

Coat of arms of Diocese of Lansing
Notes The coat of arms was designed and adopted when the Diocese was erected. It was designed in 1937 by Chaignon LaRose. Adopted 1937 Escutcheon The shield is charged with two lances crossed diagonally and a Cross moline overlaid on them. The heraldic colors are blue and silver (white). Symbolism The two crossed lances play on the name "Lansing". They also represent the juncture of the Grand and Red Cedar Rivers. The Moline cross derives from the coat of arms of the Ingham family, which was a first family in Ingham County, Michigan, in which the see city of the Diocese is located. The blue and silver (white) colors of the escutcheon are the heraldic colors of Saint Mary, Mother of Jesus, the Patroness of the Diocese and of its cathedral church.
