= Alexander M. Zaleski =

20th-century American Roman Catholic bishop

His Excellency, The Most Reverend Alexander Mieceslaus Zaleski
- Bishop of Lansing; Titular bishop of Lyrbe
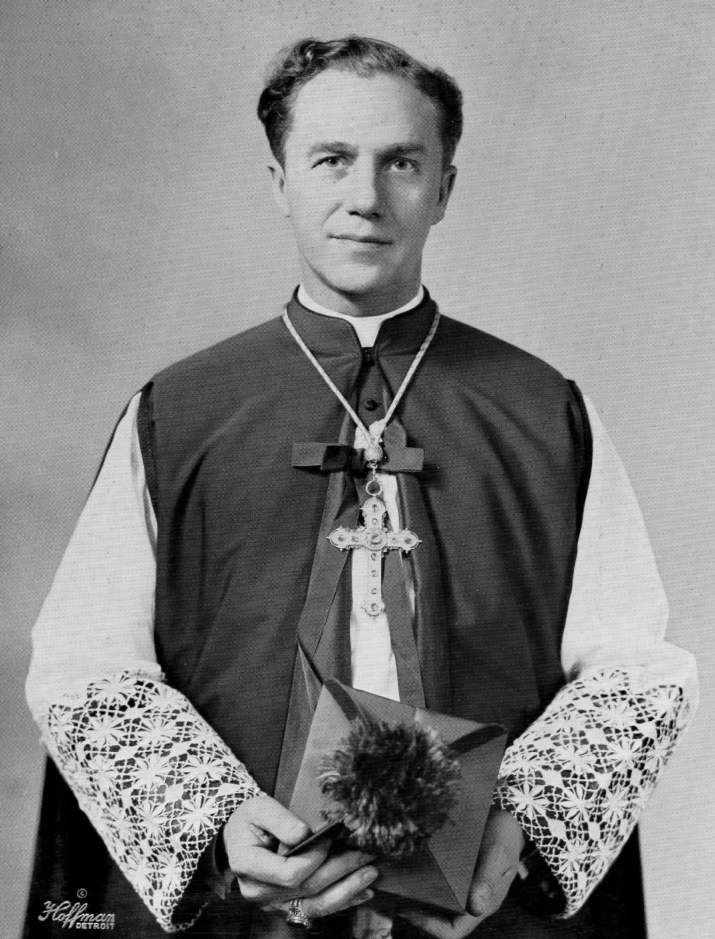
- See: Diocese of Lansing
- In office: December 1, 1965 to May 16, 1975
- Predecessor: Joseph H. Albers
- Successor: Kenneth Joseph Povish
- Other posts: Auxiliary Bishop of Detroit; 1950 to 1964

Orders
- Ordination: July 12, 1931 by John Gregory Murray
- Consecration: May 23, 1950 by Edward Aloysius Mooney

Personal details
- Born: June 24, 1906 Laurel, New York, US
- Died: May 16, 1975 (aged 68) Lansing, Michigan, US
- Education: American College of the Immaculate Conception; Pontifical Biblical Institute
- Motto: Manus tua deducet me (Your hand will lead)

Alexander Mieceslaus Zaleski (June 24, 1906 – May 16, 1975) was an American prelate of the Roman Catholic Church. He served as bishop of the Diocese of Lansing in Michigan from 1965 until his death in 1975. He previously served as an auxiliary bishop of the Archdiocese of Detroit in Michigan from 1950 to 1965.

== Biography ==
=== Early life ===
One of seven children, Alexander Zaleski was born on June 24, 1906, in Laurel, New York, to Anthony and Bertha (née Janulewicz) Zaleski. After graduating from Don Bosco Preparatory High School at Ramsey, New Jersey, in 1924, he attended SS. Cyril and Methodius Seminary in Orchard Lake, Michigan. He went to Leuven, Belgium, in 1927 to study at the American College of Louvain.

=== Priesthood ===
Zaleski was ordained to the priesthood for the Diocese of Detroit by Archbishop John Gregory Murray in Leuven on July 12, 1931. Following his return to Michigan, the diocese assigned Zaleski served as a curate at Resurrection Parish in Detroit. In 1932, he was transferred to St. Thomas the Apostle Parish in the same city. In 1935, Zaleski returned to Rome to study at the Pontifical Biblical Institute, earning a Licentiate of Sacred Scripture.

After returning to Michigan in 1935, Zaleski was named to the faculty of SS. Cyril and Methodius Seminary in Orchard Lake, Michigan. He left the seminary in 1937 to become vice-chancellor of what was now the Archdiocese of Detroit. In 1949, Zaleski was named pastor of St. Vincent de Paul Parish in Pontiac, Michigan. He transferred in 1956 to St. Alphonsus Parish in Dearborn to serve as pastor there. The Vatican elevated Zaleski to the rank of domestic prelate in 1946.

=== Auxiliary Bishop of Detroit ===
On March 28, 1950, Zaleski was appointed as auxiliary bishop of Detroit and titular bishop of Lyrbe by Pope Pius XII. He received his episcopal consecration at the Cathedral of the Most Blessed Sacrament in Detroit on May 23, 1950, from Cardinal Edward Mooney, with Bishops Stephen Woznicki and Allen Babcock serving as co-consecrators. Zaleski was appointed vicar general of the archdiocese in 1954. While auxiliary bishop, he continued to serve as pastor at St. Alphonsus.

=== Coadjutor Bishop and Bishop of Lansing ===
Zaleski was named coadjutor bishop of Lansing on October 7, 1964, by Pope Paul VI. Upon the death of Bishop Joseph H. Albers, Zaleski succeeded him as bishop on December 1, 1965. He also served as chairman of the Committee on Doctrine in the United States Conference of Catholic Bishops; in this capacity, he played a prominent role in the censuring of liberal theologian Charles Curran. Zaleski was present at the opening session of the Second Vatican Council in Rome in 1962.

=== Death and legacy ===
Alexander Zaleski died on May 16, 1975, in Lansing at age 68.

Catholic Church titles
Preceded by Joseph H. Albers	Bishop of Lansing; 1965—1975	Succeeded by Kenneth Joseph Povish
