= St. Mark Seminary =

- The coat of arms of St. Mark Seminary

Location
- 429 East Grandview Boulevard; Erie, Pennsylvania; 42°05′53″N 80°03′05″W

Information
- Type: Roman Catholic seminary
- Established: 1945 (81 years ago)
- Rector: Very Rev. Scott Jabo
- Website: erievocations.org/st-mark-seminary/

St. Mark Seminary is a diocesan minor seminary operated by the Roman Catholic Diocese of Erie and located on a campus in the southeast corner of the city of Erie, Pennsylvania. Seminarians in residence at the seminary pursue philosophy and liberal arts studies at Gannon University. The seminary houses seminarians from the Roman Catholic Diocese of Erie and other dioceses in the region.

== History ==
Bishop John Mark Gannon founded St. Mark Seminary as a diocesan seminary for the Diocese of Erie in 1945. Originally housed in a building on East Third Street in the city of Erie, with an enrollment of 93 seminarians by 1957 it soon outgrew its original facility. Twenty-two acres (8.9 ha) were purchased for a new campus and buildings outside the southeast corner of the city. This new seminary was dedicated by Bishop Gannon on June 2, 1960, and remains the home of St. Mark Seminary today. The arms of the seminary were designed by William F. J. Ryan.

In 1972, Erie opened the seminary program at St. Mark's to seminarians from other dioceses, and accepted men studying for the priesthood in the dioceses of Greensburg, Pittsburgh, Altoona-Johnstown, Richmond, and Arlington. The high school seminary program was discontinued in 1983, and the program shifted its focus to providing seminary formation exclusively for men in college-level studies.

The Very Rev. Scott Jabo has served as Rector since 2021, and the current vice rector is Fr. David Renne. Seminarians currently in formation at St. Mark's are studying for the dioceses of Erie, Altoona-Johnstown, Buffalo, Greensburg, and Rochester.
