= Diocese of Kalamazoo =

Latin Catholic jurisdiction in the US

Coordinates: 42°17′30″N 85°35′29″W

Diocese of Kalamazoo Dioecesis Kalamazuensis
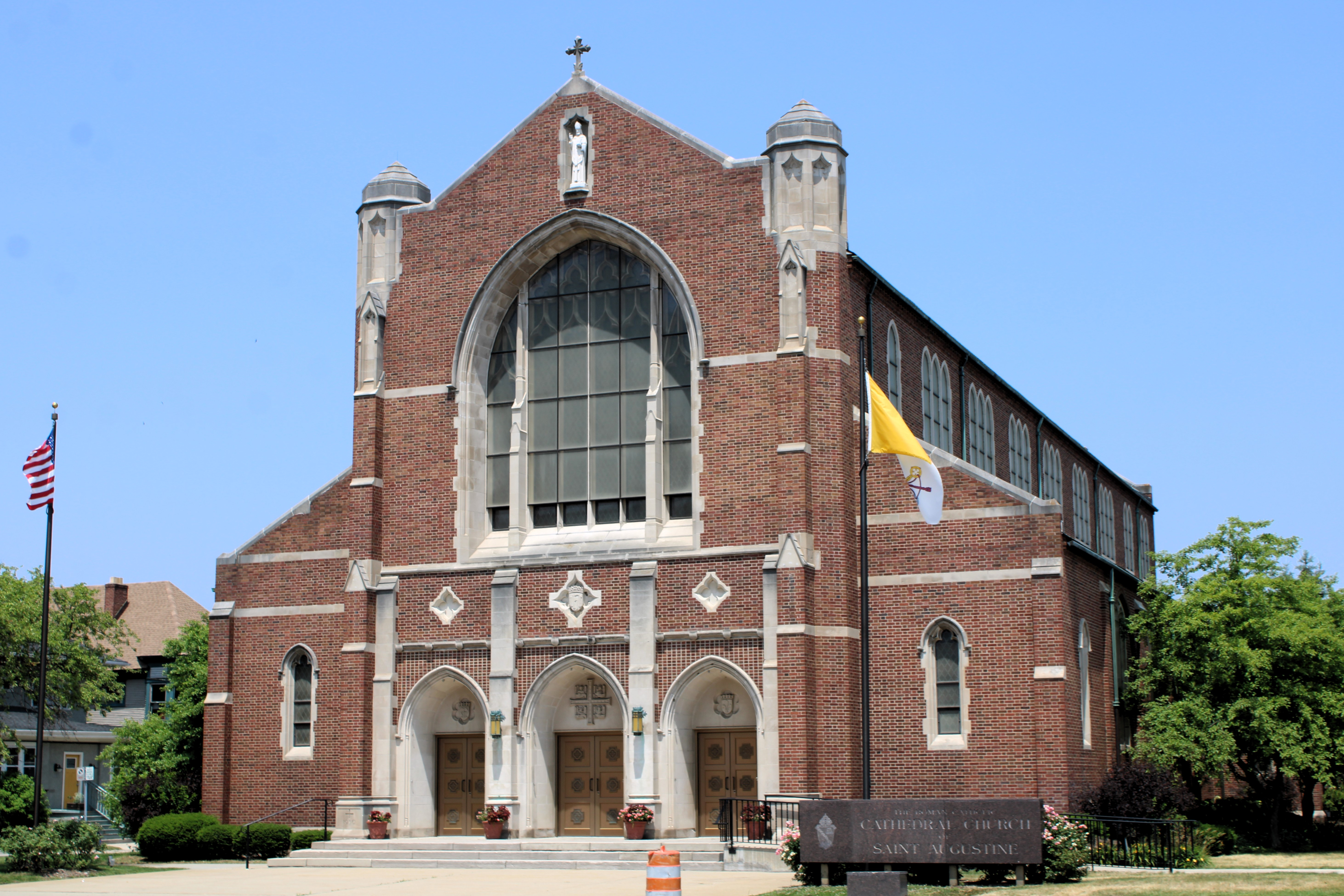
- Cathedral of Saint Augustine

- Coat of arms

Location
- Country: United States
- Territory: Counties of Allegan, Barry, Van Buren, Kalamazoo, Calhoun, Berrien, Cass, St. Joseph, and Branch
- Ecclesiastical province: Detroit

Statistics
- Area: 5,337 sq mi (13,820 km^{2})
- Population: Total; Catholics: 952,812; 101,888 (11%)
- Parishes: 46 (+13 missions)
- Schools: 22 • Three high schools • Two middle schools • 14 elementary schools • Two stand-alone preschools

Information
- Denomination: Catholic Church
- Sui iuris church: Latin Church
- Rite: Roman Rite
- Established: December 19, 1970 (55 years ago)
- Cathedral: Cathedral of Saint Augustine
- Patron saint: St. Augustine of Hippo
- Secular priests: 75

Current leadership
- Pope: Leo XIV
- Bishop: Edward M. Lohse
- Metropolitan Archbishop: Edward Weisenburger
- Vicar General: Rev. Fabio Garzon
- Bishops emeritus: Paul Joseph Bradley

Map
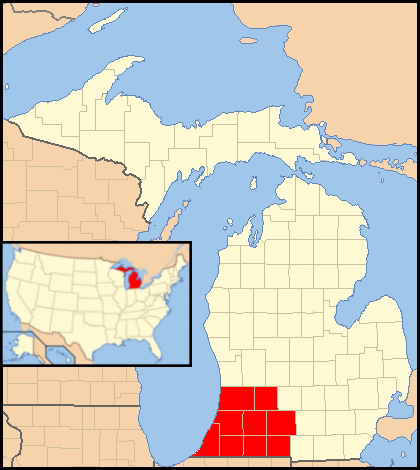

Website
- diokzoo.org

The Diocese of Kalamazoo (Latin: Dioecesis Kalamazuensis) is a diocese of the Catholic Church in southwestern Michigan in the United States. It is a suffragan diocese of the metropolitan Archdiocese of Detroit. The mother church is the Cathedral of Saint Augustine in Kalamazoo. The bishop is Edward Lohse.

== Territory ==
The Diocese of Kalamazoo comprises nine counties of the State of Michigan: Allegan, Barry, Berrien, Branch, Calhoun, Cass, Kalamazoo, Saint Joseph, and Van Buren.

== History ==
=== 1700 to 1800 ===
During the 17th century, the territory of modern Michigan was part of the French colony of New France, and subject to the jurisdiction of the Diocese of Quebec. In 1763, with the end of the French and Indian War, the territory of modern Michigan became part of the British Province of Quebec, and settlement by American colonists was forbidden. After the American Revolution ended in 1783, the territory became part of the new United States. The Vatican in 1789 erected the Diocese of Baltimore, whose territory consisted of the whole nation.

=== 1800 to 1970 ===
In 1808, Pope Pius VII erected the Diocese of Bardstown, which included the newly organized Territory of Michigan from the Diocese of Baltimore. In 1821, Pius VII found the Diocese of Cincinnati, transferring Michigan to that jurisdiction. The first mass in Kalamazoo, then a small village, was celebrated by a visiting priest in a private home in 1832.

Pope Gregory XVI erected the Diocese of Detroit in 1833, covering all of Michigan. The diocese established a mission in Kalamazoo in 1843. The first Catholic church in Kalamazoo, St. Augustine, was finally dedicated in 1852. St Philip, the first Catholic church in Battle Creek, was dedicated by bishop Caspar H. Borgess of Detroit in 1879. Borgess in 1888 donated $5,000 towards the construction of a Catholic Hospital in Kalamazoo. Borgess Hospital opened in 1889.Today it is Beacon Kalamazoo.

In 1913, Nazareth College opened in Nazareth, Michigan. It had originated as Nazareth Academy, a girls high school, in 1888. The Sisters of St. Joseph in 1915 opened the St. Agnes Foundling Home in Kalamazoo for unwed mothers and children in need. Its successor is Catholic Charities Diocese of Kalamazoo.

Pope Pius XI in 1937 established the Diocese of Lansing, including the Kalamazoo area. This area would be part of the Diocese of Lansing for the next 33 years.

=== 1970 to 2000 ===
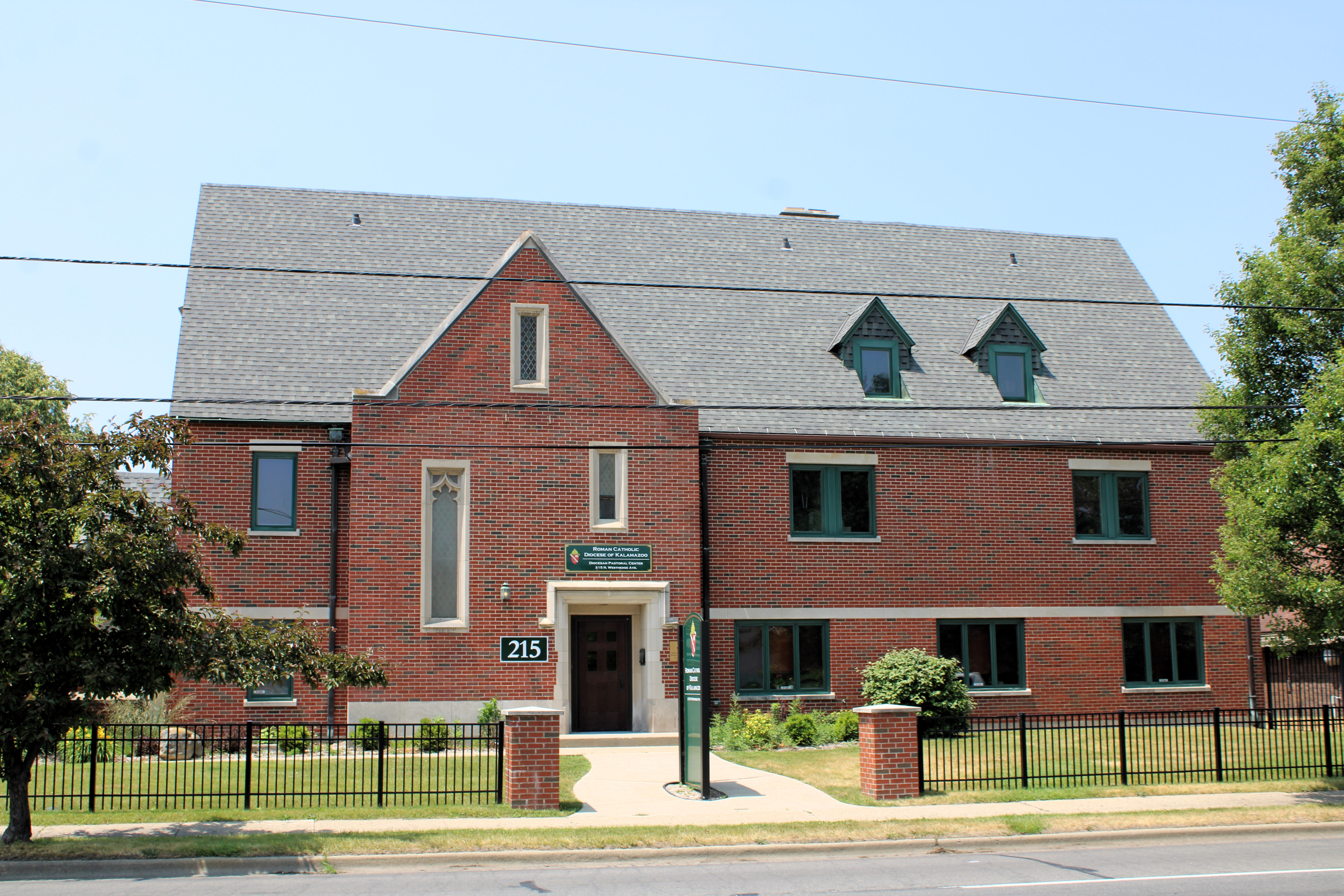
Diocesan Pastoral Center, Kalamazoo, Michigan (2023)

On December 19, 1970, Pope Paul VI erected the Diocese of Kalamazoo by transferring territories from the Diocese of Grand Rapids and the Diocese of Lansing. The pope designated St. Augustine Church in Kalamazoo as the cathedral for the new diocese. Paul VI named Paul V. Donovan of Lansing as the first bishop of Kalamazoo.

In 1971, Donovan established the Kalamazoo Diocesan Council of Catholic Women.Donovan also established the Office of Hispanic Ministry, and the Diocesan Heating Assistance program. He also started the Catholic Community Center in Benton Harbor, an outreach facility.Donovan resigned as bishop of Kalamazoo in 1994 after serving for 23 years.

In 1994, Pope John Paul II appointed Auxiliary Bishop Alfred J. Markiewicz from the Diocese of Rockville Centre as the second bishop of Kalamazoo. He died in 1997 after only three years in office. That same year, John Paul II named James A. Murray of Lansing to replace Markiewicz.in 2006. Murray released the “Diocesan Pastoral Plan for Hispanic Latino Ministry.” He also established the diocese Trauma Recovery Program for victims of childhood trauma.

=== 2000 to present ===
in 2006, Murray resigned as bishop of Kalamazoo in 2009.Auxiliary Bishop Paul J. Bradley of the Diocese of Pittsburgh was named the next bishop of Kalamazoo by Pope Benedict XVI in 2009.During his tenure, Bradley grouped the 59 parishes and missions into 28 parish collaboratives. In 2019, he convened an eucharistic conference in Kalamazoo with over 1,000 attendees.

Bradley retired as bishop of Kalamazoo in May 2023. His successor was Edward M. Lohse from the Diocese of Erie, appointed by Pope Francis. Lohse was installed in July 2023.

=== Sexual abuse ===
In September 2018, Bishop Bradley proposed a ten-step plan for overhauling church policies on the reporting of sexual abuse allegations.

In January 2019, Bradley assigned Archbishop Emeritus John Nienstedt, of the Archdiocese of St. Paul and Minneapolis, to assist for several months at a parish in Battle Creek. Many parishioners in Battle Creek did not want Nienstadt due to his failure to report sexual abuse claims as archbishop. After two weeks, Nienstadt left the parish.That same year, the Michigan Department of Attorney General executed a search warrant at the diocesan headquarter for the files on priests with allegations of sexual abuse.

In May 2019, Michigan Attorney General Dana Nessel announced that Jacob Vellian had been indicted on two charges of rape. The priest was accused of sexually assaulting a 15-year-old girl between 1973 and 1974 at St. John the Evangelist Church. As Vellian was now living in India, prosecutors were attempting to extradite him to the United States.

In February 2020, the diocese announced that an individual was claiming that the priest Richard Fritz, who faced embezzlement charges in 2017, had sexually abused them during the late 1970s and early 1980s. In March 2020, the diocese determined that the allegations against Fritz were credible.

Nessel in May 2024 released her final report on abuse of children in the Diocese of Kalamazoo. The investigation found 11 priests with credible accusations of sexual abuse. Only seven priests on the list were still alive and all were in retirement.

== Bishops ==
- Paul Vincent Donovan (1971–1994)
- Alfred John Markiewicz (1995–1997)
- James Albert Murray (1998–2009)
- Paul Joseph Bradley (2009–2023)
- Edward Mark Lohse (2023–present)

== Coat of arms ==
The coat of arms of the diocese of Kalamazoo has the following elements.

- A red field representing the Native American peoples of the diocese
- A silver wavy band representing the Kalamazoo River; Kalamazoo was a Native American word for "boiling pot."
- Blue annulets representing bubbles in the river
- A Native American peace pipe with gold feathers

The coat of arms also contains an open book displaying the Latin phrase Tolle Lege (Take and Read). The book represents the bible and the quote comes from the biography of Augustine of Hippo, patron saint of the diocesan cathedral.

== Education ==
As of 2026, the Diocese of Kalamazoo has three high schools, two middle schools and 14 elementary schools.

=== High Schools ===
- Hackett Catholic Prep – Kalamazoo
- Our Lady of the Lake Catholic School – St. Joseph
- St. Philip Catholic Central High School – Battle Creek
