= Joseph H. Albers =

American prelate

His Excellency, The Most Reverend Joseph H. Albers
- Bishop of Lansing; Titular Bishop of Lunda
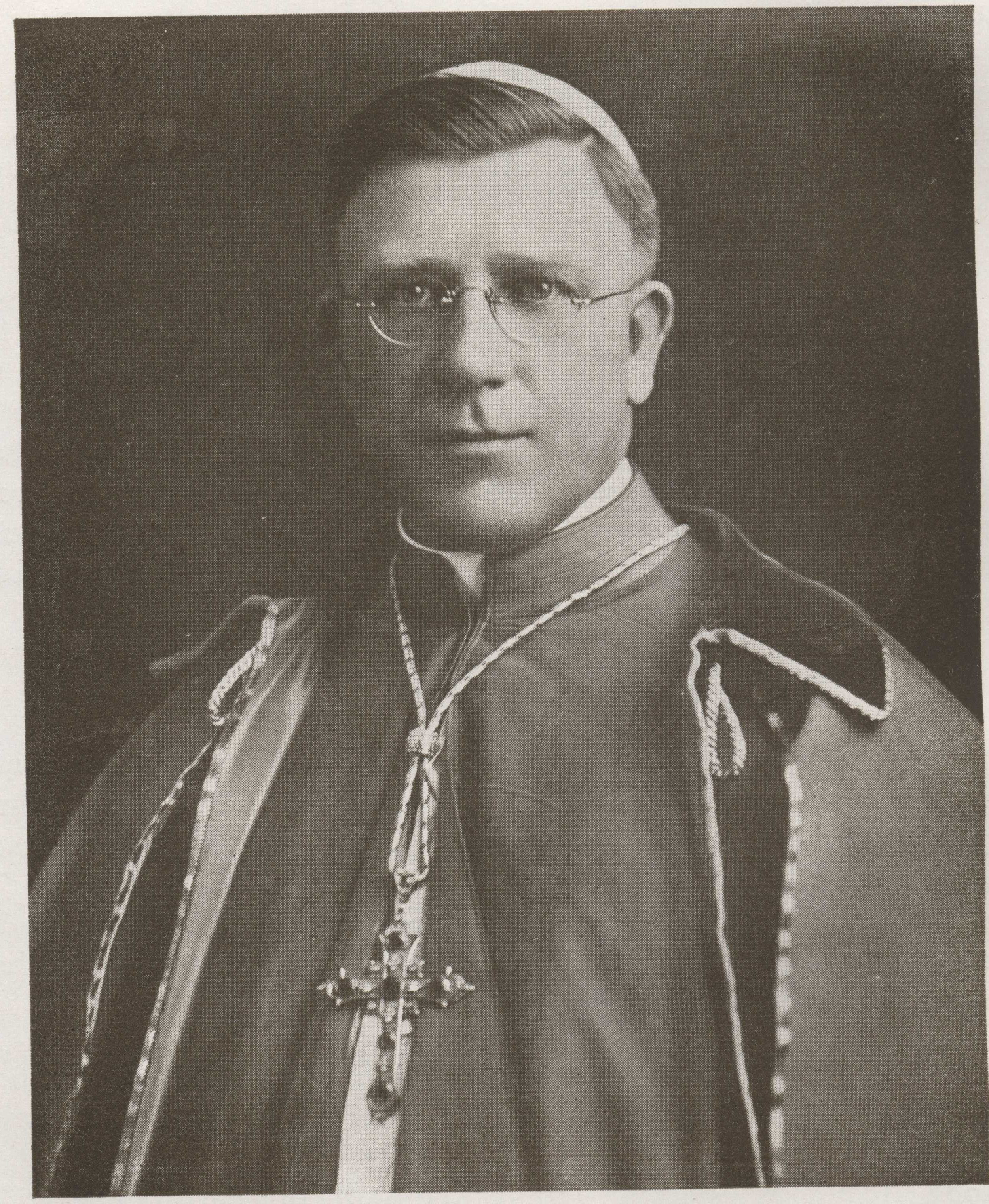
- Church: Roman Catholic
- See: Diocese of Lansing
- In office: August 4, 1937 - December 1, 1965
- Successor: Alexander M. Zaleski
- Previous posts: Auxiliary Bishop of Cincinnati (1929 to 1937); Titular Bishop of Lunda (1929 to 1937)

Orders
- Ordination: June 16, 1916 by Henry Moeller
- Consecration: August 4, 1937 by John T. McNicholas

Personal details
- Born: March 18, 1891 Cincinnati, Ohio, US
- Died: December 1, 1965 (aged 74) Lansing, Michigan, US
- Buried: St. Joseph's Catholic Cemetery, Lansing
- Education: Appollonaire University

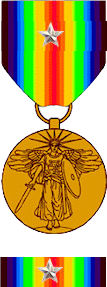
Example of Citation Star on World War I Victory Medal

Joseph H. Albers D.D. (March 18, 1891 – December 1, 1965) was an American prelate of the Roman Catholic Church. He was titular bishop of Lunda, having been appointed by Pope Pius XI in 1929. Albers served as the first bishop of the new Diocese of Lansing in Michigan from 1937 until his death in 1965. He previously served as an auxiliary bishop of the Archdiocese of Cincinnati in Ohio from 1929 until 1937. He was appointed as an assistant to the papal throne in 1954.

Albers received a Silver Star for his service as a US Army chaplain in France during World War I.

== Biography ==
=== Early life ===
Joseph Albers was born on March 18, 1891, in Cincinnati, Ohio. He was educated at St. Francis Xavier College and Mount St. Mary College, both in Cincinnati.

=== Priesthood ===
Albers was ordained a priest for the Archdiocese of Cincinnati by Archbishop Henry Moeller on June 17, 1916. After his ordination, Albers served as an assistant pastor at Old St. Mary's Parish in Cincinnati.

After the American entry into World War I in 1917, Albers join the US Army Chaplain Corps; he was commissioned as an officer in June 1918. He served in the infantry in France in 1918, seeing combat in battle of Château-Thierry in June and the battle of Saint Mihiel from September 11th to 15th. Albers' final engagement was the Meuse–Argonne offensive, which lasted from late September until the declaration of armistice in November. During 1918, Albers was wounded three times and injured in a mustard gas attack. He received the Silver Star for bravery in action.

After being discharged from the Army in 1919, Albers returned to Cincinnati. He soon became assistant chancellor and assistant to the archbishop. In 1925, Alberts was appointed chancellor. In 1926, he became a monsignor. Albers studied canon law at Appollonaire University in Rome for two years, receiving a Doctor of Canon Law degree. Once back in Ohio, Albers resumed his post as chancellor.

=== Auxiliary Bishop of Cincinnati ===
On December 16, 1929, Pope Pius XI appointed Albers as titular bishop of Lunda and as an auxiliary bishop of Cincinnati. He was consecrated by Archbishop John Timothy McNicholas at Saint Peter in Chains Cathedral in Cincinnati on December 27, 1929.

=== Bishop of Lansing ===
On May 26, 1937, Pius XI appointed Albers as the first bishop of the new Diocese of Lansing. He was installed on August 4, 1937, by Archbishop John Timothy McNicholas. In January 1938, the rectory of St. Mary Cathedral caught fire. Albers, his lungs weaken ed by the exposure to mustard gas, collapsed at the scene and was rescued by firefighters. In 1940, Albers moved into Meadowvue in Eaton Rapids, Michigan, his new episcopal residence. The Vatican appointed him in 1954 as an assistant at the pontifical throne.

During Albers's episcopacy, the diocese built 38 parishes, 42 elementary schools and two high schools. This earned Albers the appellation "The Builder". Albers enjoyed a special devotion to Saint Joseph; one of the new parishes was named for him. In 1954, the diocesan newsletter Catholic Weekly, Lansing began publication; Albers was instrumental in its startup. In 1962, Albers attended the opening session in Rome of the Second Vatican Council.

=== Retirement and legacy ===
On October 7, 1964, Pope Paul VI appointed Bishop Alexander M. Zaleski coadjutor bishop of Lansing to assist Albers due to his poor health. Joseph Albers died in Lansing on December 1, 1965, at age 74. He was interred at St. Joseph's Catholic Cemetery in Lansing. Zaleski automatically succeeded him as Bishop of Lansing.

The Knights of Columbus has a chapter named for him, the Bishop Joseph H. Albers Council 4090 in Davison, Michigan. St. Joseph's Catholic Church was established in Battle Creek, Michigan in 1941. To pay for the church, part of the grounds was subdivided and sold. That section is named "Bishop Albers Subdivision". The Diocese of Lansing operates the Bishop Joseph H. Albers Vocations Trust Fund, which provides scholarships to seminarians.

Catholic Church titles
Preceded by None	Bishop of Lansing; 1937—1965	Succeeded by Alexander M. Zaleski
Preceded by Martin Meulenberg, S.M.M.	Titular Bishop of Lunda; 1929—1937	Succeeded by George John Rehring
