= Daniel L. Ryan =

American prelate of the Catholic Church (1930–2015)

His Excellency, The Most Reverend Daniel Leo Ryan
- Bishop of Springfield in Illinois; Titular Bishop of Surista
- Church: Catholic Church; Latin Church
- Diocese: Springfield in Illinois
- Appointed: November 22, 1983
- Installed: January 18, 1984
- Term ended: October 19, 1999
- Predecessor: Joseph Alphonse McNicholas
- Successor: George Joseph Lucas
- Previous post: Auxiliary bishop of Joliet (1981‍–‍1983)

Orders
- Ordination: May 3, 1956 by Martin Dewey McNamara
- Consecration: September 30, 1981 by Joseph Imesch

Personal details
- Born: September 28, 1930 Mankato, Minnesota, US
- Died: December 31, 2015 (aged 85) Naperville, Illinois, US
- Education: St. Procopius Seminary; Pontifical Lateran University
- Motto: Everlasting is his love

Daniel Leo Ryan (September 28, 1930 – December 31, 2015) was an American prelate of the Catholic Church. He served as bishop of Diocese of Springfield in Illinois from 1984 to 1999. He previously served as an auxiliary bishop of the Diocese of Joliet in Illinois from 1981 to 1984.

Amid accusations of personal sexual misconduct and the protecting of sexually abusive priests, Ryan resigned as bishop of Springfield in Illinois in 1999.

== Biography ==
=== Early life ===
Daniel Ryan was born on September 28, 1930 in Mankato, Minnesota, to Leonard and Irene (née Larson) Ryan. While he was a child, the family moved to Springfield, Illinois. Ryan attended Cathedral Boys High School in Springfield, then entered the Passionist Preparatory Seminary in St. Louis, Missouri. After finishing at the seminary, Ryan entered the novitiate to become a monk. However, after deciding to become a priest instead, Ryan went to St. Procopius Seminary in Lisle, Illinois, where he obtained a Bachelor of Arts degree in classical languages in 1952.

=== Priesthood ===
Ryan was ordained to the priesthood at the Cathedral of St. Raymond Nonnatus in Joliet, Illinois, by Bishop Martin McNamara for the Diocese of Joliet on May 3, 1956. After his ordination, Ryan was assigned as assistant pastor at St. Paul the Apostle Parish in Joliet. He also served as a notary for the diocese. He was then sent to Rome to attend the Pontifical Lateran University, earning a Licentiate of Canon Law in 1960.

After returning to Illinois, Ryan had the following parish assignments:

- Curate at St. Joseph in Rockdale
- Curate at St. Mary Nativity in Joliet
- Pastor of St. Thaddeus in Joliet
- Pastor of St. Michael in Wheaton

Ryan was later appointed as chancellor and vicar general of the diocese.

=== Auxiliary Bishop of Joliet ===
On August 14, 1981, Ryan was appointed as an auxiliary bishop of Joliet and titular bishop of Surista by Pope John Paul II. He received his episcopal consecration on September 30, 1981, from Bishop Joseph Imesch, with Bishops Raymond J. Vonesh and Daniel Kucera serving as co-consecrators.

=== Bishop of Springfield in Illinois ===
John Paul II appointed Ryan as the seventh bishop of Springfield in Illinois on November 22, 1983. He was installed at the Cathedral of the Immaculate Conception in Springfield on January 18, 1984. In 1986, Ryan announced that he had an alcohol dependency condition and then entered a treatment center for three months.

In 1997 and 1998, an Illinois group called Roman Catholic Faithful picketed the US Conference of Catholic Bishops meeting in Washington, D.C., carrying signs accusing Ryan of protecting abusive priests. He himself was accused of engaging in sexual affairs with men.

=== Resignation and legacy ===
On October 19, 1999, John Paul II accepted Ryan's resignation as bishop of Springfield, effective immediately, six years before the mandatory retirement of 75 for bishops.

In late October 1999, Matthew McCormick sued the Diocese of Springfield, claiming that Reverend Alvin J. Campbell, a diocesan priest, abused him as an altar boy from 1982 to 1985. McCormick claimed that Ryan and the diocese did nothing to protect him, and that Ryan was guilty of numerous sexual affairs with male prostitutes and priests, creating a poisoned atmosphere. A diocese spokesperson said that Ryan removed Campbell in 1985 as soon as he heard about the accusations. Campbell later spent seven years in prison for child sexual abuse. Ryan denied having any affairs. The diocese settled with McCormick in 2004.

In a 2002 Joliet Herald-News article, an unidentified priest from the Diocese of Joliet said that Ryan made sexual advances against him when the two men were staying at a hotel while visiting an out of town parish in 1982. In August 2002, the diocese received allegations that Ryan had solicited sex from four boys in 1984. One of the alleged victims, Frank Sigretto, said that Ryan picked him up off the street and offered him $50 for a massage. During the massage, Ryan made sexual advances to the 15-year-old boy. The diocese referred its case to the Sangamon County, Illinois district attorney, but the DA could not prosecute Ryan because the statute of limitations had expired.

Having continued to administer confirmation and celebrate mass, Ryan voluntarily agreed in 2004 to suspend his public ministry. In 2006, an independent investigative report was commissioned by Bishop George Lucas, Ryan's successor. In its report, the Special Panel on Clergy Misconduct declared that Ryan "engaged in improper sexual conduct and used his office to conceal his activities". Ryan also fostered "a culture of secrecy...that discouraged faithful priests from coming forward with information about misconduct" by other clergy in the diocese.

In his final years, Ryan resided at Sunrise of Naperville North, a senior facility in Naperville, Illinois. Daniel Ryan died in Naperville on December 31, 2015, at age 85.

Catholic Church titles
Preceded by Joseph Alphonse McNicholas	Bishop of Springfield in Illinois; 1984—1999	Succeeded by George Joseph Lucas
