= George Joseph Lucas =

American Catholic prelate (born 1949)

His Excellency, The Most Reverend George Joseph Lucas
- Archbishop Emeritus of Omaha
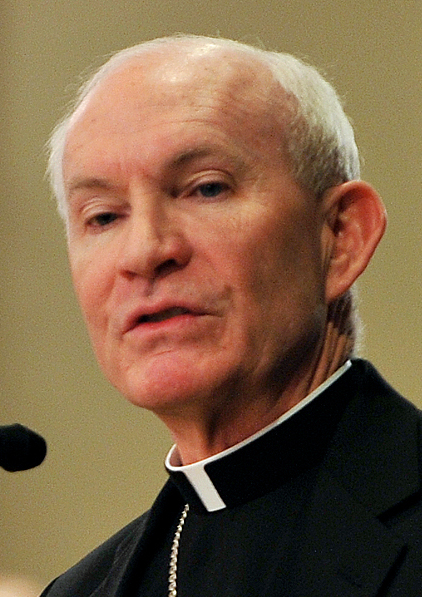
- Lucas in 2011
- Church: Catholic Church; Latin Church
- Archdiocese: Omaha
- Appointed: June 3, 2009
- Installed: July 22, 2009
- Retired: March 31, 2025
- Predecessor: Elden Francis Curtiss
- Successor: Michael George McGovern
- Previous posts: Apostolic Administrator of Lincoln (2019‍–‍2020); Bishop of Springfield in Illinois (1999‍–‍2009)

Orders
- Ordination: May 24, 1975 by John Carberry
- Consecration: December 14, 1999 by Francis George

Personal details
- Born: George Joseph Lucas; June 12, 1949 (age 77) St. Louis, Missouri, U.S.
- Education: Cardinal Glennon College; Kenrick Seminary
- Motto: Grace and mercy (Wisdom 3:9)

Ordination history
History
Priestly ordination
- Ordained by: John Carberry
Episcopal consecration
- Principal consecrator: Francis George
- Co-consecrators: Gabriel Montalvo Higuera, Daniel L. Ryan
Episcopal succession
Bishops consecrated by George Joseph Lucas as principal consecrator
- Joseph Gerard Hanefeldt: 2015

Styles of George Joseph Lucas
- Reference style: His Excellency; The Most Reverend
- Spoken style: Your Excellency
- Religious style: Archbishop

George Joseph Lucas (born June 12, 1949) is an American prelate of the Catholic Church who served as the metropolitan archbishop of the Archdiocese of Omaha in Nebraska from 2009 to 2025. He was bishop of the Diocese of Springfield in Illinois from 1999 to 2009.

== Biography ==
=== Early life and education ===
George Lucas was born in on June 12, 1949, in St. Louis, Missouri, as the eldest of the four children of George and Mary (née Kelly) Lucas; he has one sister, Catherine, and two brothers, James and John. He attended St. Louis Preparatory Seminary South in Shrewsbury, Missouri, from 1963 to 1967. He studied at Cardinal Glennon College in Shrewsbury obtaining his Bachelor of Philosophy degree in 1971. Lucas then studied theology at Kenrick Seminary in Shrewsbury from 1971 to 1975.

=== Ordination and ministry ===
Lucas was ordained to the priesthood by Cardinal John Carberry on May 24, 1975. He served as associate pastor of St. Justin Martyr Parish in Sunset Hills, Missouri, until 1980, and of St. Dismas Parish in Florissant, Missouri, until 1981.

While part-time associate pastor of Our Lady of Mt. Carmel Parish in St. Louis (1981–1984) and of Ascension Parish in Normandy, Missouri, (1984–1986), Lucas furthered his studies at St. Louis University from 1982 to 1986, earning his Master's degree in history. In 1981, he became a professor, then one year later vice-principal of St. Louis Preparatory Seminary North in Florissant, serving there in both roles until the seminary closed in 1987 (1981–1987).

Lucas was part-time associate pastor at St. Ann Parish in Normandy (1986–1989) and St. Peter Parish in Kirkwood, Missouri (1989–1990). In 1987, he began teaching at what was now St. Louis Preparatory Seminary in Shrewsbury, becoming its dean of students that same year.

From 1990 to 1994, Lucas served as chancellor and private secretary to Archbishop John May. Lucas was raised by the Vatican to the rank of honorary prelate on September 5, 1994, and appointed by the archbishop as vicar general of St. Louis for a year before becoming rector of Kenrick-Glennon Seminary in 1995. He was a member of the Priests' Personnel Board of St. Louis from 1987 to 1990, being named its secretary in 1988. He also sat on the editorial board of the archdiocesan newspaper The St. Louis Review (1988–1999), the board of directors (1990–1995), and board of trustees (1990–1999) of Kenrick-Glennon Seminary, and the Council of Priests of St. Louis (1994–1999).

=== Bishop of Springfield in Illinois ===
On October 19, 1999, Lucas was appointed the eighth bishop of Springfield in Illinois by Pope John Paul II. He received his episcopal consecration on December 14, 1999, at the Cathedral of the Immaculate Conception in Springfield, from Cardinal Francis George, with Archbishop Gabriel Higuera and Bishop Daniel L. Ryan serving as co-consecrators.

In 2001, Lucas established a diaconate formation program for the diocese. The five-year program, which prepared men to become permanent deacons. was run by the diocesan Office for the Diaconate, in cooperation with Quincy University in Quincy, Illinois. On June 24, 2007, Lucas ordained the first class of 18 men. In January 2002, Lucas launched an endowment/capital campaign called Harvest of Thanks, Springtime of Hope, the first campaign of its kind in the history of the diocese. The program raised over $22.1 million, used to support Catholic education, Catholic Charities, the formation of seminarians and deacon candidates, and the care of retired priests.

In a video interview taped in 2004, Thomas Munoz accused Lucas, when he was a priest, of having sex with several priests and seminarians in a so-called orgy. Lucas denied all the allegations. The Diocese of Springfield investigated the allegations and in 2006 declared them to be totally false. The same allegations were raised again in 2021 in a lawsuit by Anthony J. Gorgia, a former seminarian, against the Pontifical North American College in Rome and the Archdiocese of New York.

In July 2004, Lucas approved a $1.2 million settlement to eight men who had been sexually abused as minors by Walter Weerts, a diocese priest at Sacred Heart Parish in Villa Grove, Illinois between 1973 and 1980. Convicted of sexual abuse crimes in 1986, Weerts spent three years in prison and was removed from the priesthood in March 1989.

Lucas spearheaded the Built in Faith campaign to raise the $11 million needed to restore the Cathedral of the Immaculate Conception. Lucas attended the cathedral dedication on December 2, 2009. Within the United States Conference of Catholic Bishops, Lucas sits on the Subcommittee on the Catechism and Sapientia Christiana Committee.

=== Archbishop of Omaha ===
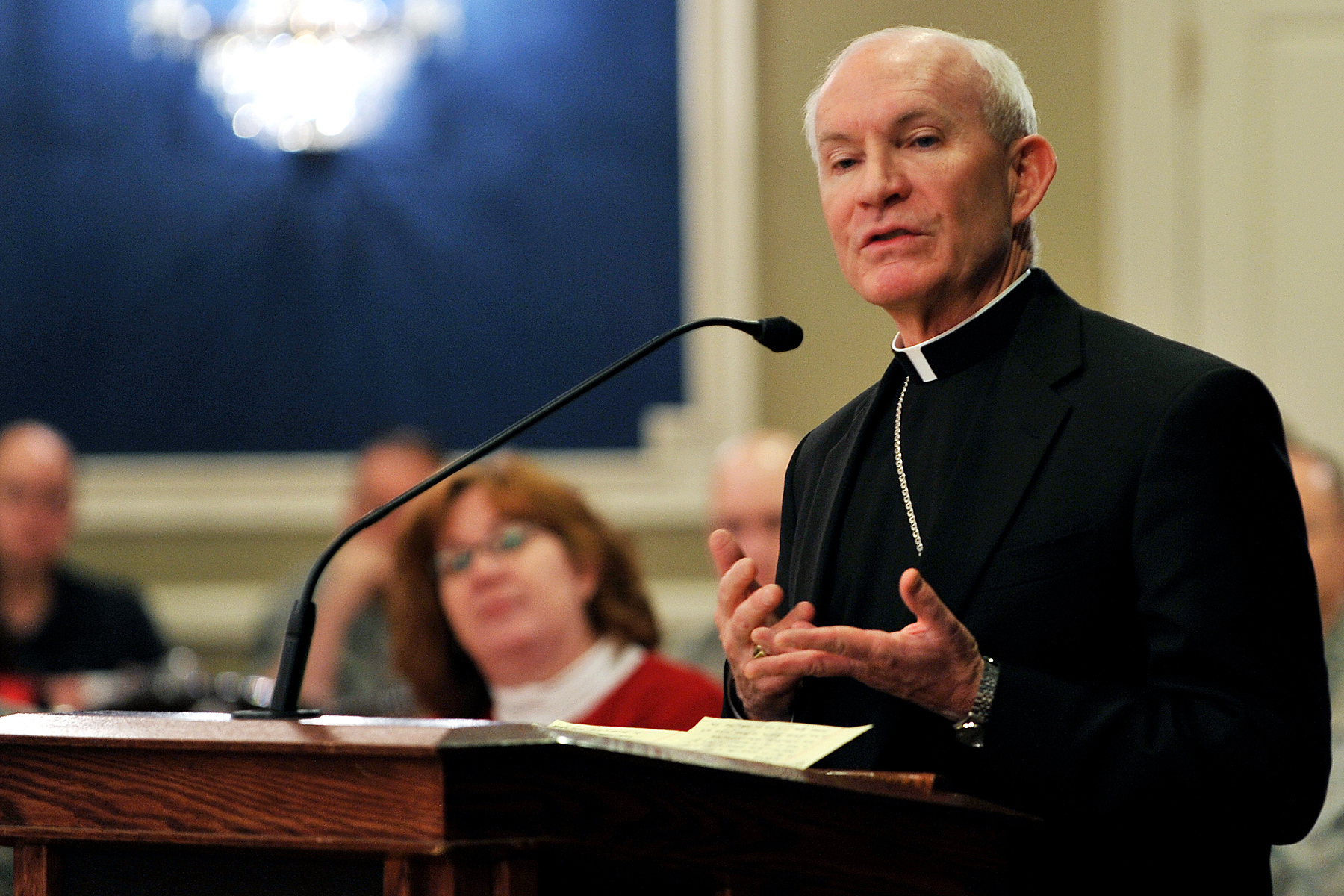
Lucas at Offutt Air Force Base in Nebraska (2011)

On June 3, 2009, Pope Benedict XVI named Lucas as the fifth archbishop of Omaha. Succeeding Archbishop Elden Curtiss, Lucas was installed at St. Cecilia Cathedral in Omaha on July 22, 2009, by Archbishop Pietro Sambi, the apostolic nuncio to the United States. The installation was attended by Curtiss, Cardinal Francis George, and Cardinal Justin Rigali. As archbishop, Lucas serves as the spiritual leader of 220,000 Catholics in Nebraska. He received the pallium, a vestment worn by metropolitan bishops, from Benedict XVI on June 29, 2009, in a ceremony at St. Peter's Basilica in Rome.

In October 2010, Lucas suppressed Intercessors of the Lamb, a hermit religious community, removing it from any association with the Catholic Church. Intercessors was founded in 1980 near Omaha, Nebraska, by Nadine Mae Brown, a member of the Sisters of the Cross. In early 2010, Brown had requested that Lucas elevate Intercessors to the status of a religious institute. As part of the approval process, Lucas sent James Conn, a canon lawyer, on a canonical visitation to the community. In his report to Lucas, Conn noted many serious discrepancies and issues in the Intercessors' current operation. The application to become a religious institute was denied, and the community was sent a list of reforms necessary to continue as a Catholic organization. Brown resigned from the community and the Intercessors leadership refused to enact the reforms. Lucas then stripped the Intercessors from the church. The community dissolved soon after.

At the end of the 2010s, Lucas signed norms stronger than the 2002 Essential Norms (so called Zero Tolerance norms related to sexual abuse of parishioners). In 2018, the archdiocese published a list of 38 priests and deacons with credible claims of sexual abuse against minors. In August 2020, Lucas and the archdiocese were sued for $2.1 million by Andrew Syring, a priest in the archdiocese. He claimed defamation of character by being removed from public ministry and being placed on a list of accused priests. Syring said he was accused of sexual abuse in 2013, but had been cleared by an archdiocesan investigation and returned to ministry. In 2018, Lucas removed him again from ministry, saying that Syring's record was clean, but the standards had changed.

In October 2018, Lucas removed Reverend Francis Nigli, pastor of St. Wenceslas Parish in Omaha, from public ministry due to inappropriate sexual advances to an adult. A 21-year-old man had accused Nigli of kissing and groping him on church grounds. In 2013, Nigli had been sent away for mental health treatment after making advances to an 18-year-old man.

In July 2024, Lucas was accused of sexual abuse of a student at St. Louis Preparatory Seminary in St. Louis in 1988. Lucas denied the accusation. On July 31, 2024, Lucas announced that he submitted his resignation to Pope Francis on June 12, 2024, as required when a bishop turns 75 years old, who insisted he stay on until a successor is named.

Pope Francis accepted Lucas's resignation as archbishop on March 31, 2025.

=== Apostolic Administrator of Lincoln ===
Pope Francis appointed Lucas to serve as apostolic administrator of the Diocese of Lincoln on December 13, 2019, when Bishop James D. Conley took a temporary leave of absence. Lucas' term as apostolic administrator ended when Conley returned to active ministry on November 13, 2020.

== See also ==
- Catholic Church in the United States
- Hierarchy of the Catholic Church
- Historical list of the Catholic bishops of the United States
- List of Catholic bishops in the United States
- Lists of popes, patriarchs, primates, archbishops, and bishops

Catholic Church titles
Preceded by Daniel L. Ryan	Bishop of Springfield in Illinois; 1999–2009	Succeeded by Thomas Paprocki
Preceded by Elden Francis Curtiss	Archbishop of Omaha; 2009–2025	Succeeded by Michael George McGovern
