= William Aloysius O'Connor =

American prelate

His Excellency, The Most Reverend William Aloysius O'Connor
- Bishop of Springfield in Illinois
- Church: Roman Catholic Church
- See: Diocese of Springfield in Illinois
- In office: March 7, 1949 to July 22, 1975
- Predecessor: James Aloysius Griffin
- Successor: Joseph Alphonse McNicholas

Orders
- Ordination: September 24, 1927 by George Mundelein
- Consecration: March 7, 1949 by Samuel Stritch

Personal details
- Born: December 27, 1903 Chicago, Illinois, US
- Died: November 14, 1983 (aged 79) Springfield, Illinois, US
- Education: St. Mary of the Lake Seminary; Propaganda College
- Motto: Praesidium nobis Deus (God is our protection)

William Aloysius O'Connor (December 27, 1903 – November 14, 1983) was an American prelate of the Roman Catholic Church. He served as bishop of the Diocese of Springfield in Illinois from 1949 to 1975.

== Biography ==
=== Early life ===
William O'Connor was born on December 27, 1903, in Chicago, Illinois, to John and Mary (née Murphy) O'Connor. His brother was longtime Chicago newsman Len O'Connor. William O'Connor attended Archbishop Quigley Preparatory Seminary in Chicago from 1917 to 1922, and St. Mary of the Lake Seminary in Mundelein, Illinois, from 1922 to 1928.

=== Priesthood ===
O'Connor was ordained to the priesthood for the Archdiocese of Chicago by Cardinal George Mundelein on September 24, 1927. He then furthered his studies in Rome at the Propaganda College, obtaining a Doctor of Sacred Theology degree in 1930.

On his return to Chicago in 1930, O'Connor served as a professor at Archbishop Quigley Preparatory Seminary until 1935. He then attended the New York School of Social Work in New York City before becoming superintendent of St. Mary's Training School in Des Plaines, Illinois, in 1936. He was named supervisor of Catholic Charities in the archdiocese in 1938, and president of the National Conference of Catholic Charities in 1944. O'Connor was raised by the Vatican to the rank of a domestic prelate in 1946. He also served on the advisory board of the War Relief Services in the National Catholic Welfare Council and as director of the USO Council of Chicago.

==== Bishop of Springfield in Illinois ====
On December 17, 1948, O'Connor was appointed the fifth bishop of Springfield in Illinois by Pope Pius XII. He received his episcopal consecration on March 7, 1949, at Holy Name Cathedral in Chicago from Cardinal Samuel Stritch, with Bishops John Boylan and Albert Zuroweste serving as co-consecrators.

O'Connor instituted the Confraternity of Christian Doctrine in 1950, initiated the diocesan development fund in 1952 for missionary work within the diocese, and founded the diocesan Latin School in 1954 for training young men preparing to enter the priesthood. He held diocesan synods in 1953 and 1963. O'Connor attended all four sessions of the Second Vatican Council in Rome between 1962 and 1965, and was a member of the administrative board of the United States Catholic Conference and Department of Health Affairs from 1969 to 1972.

=== Retirement and death ===
On July 22, 1975, Pope Paul VI accepted O'Connor's resignation as bishop of Springfield in Illinois. William O'Connor died after suffering a cardiac arrest at St. John's Hospital in Springfield on November 14, 1983, at age 79.

Catholic Church titles
Preceded by James Aloysius Griffin	Bishop of Springfield in Illinois; 1949—1975	Succeeded by Joseph Alphonse McNicholas
