= Fortnight for Freedom =

Fortnight for Freedom was a 14-day mass action campaign on religious liberty in the United States that ran from 2012 to 2018. it was inaugurated in 2012 by the United States Conference of Catholic Bishops (USCCB). Fortnight for Freedom events occurred in dioceses and parishes around the country from June 21 to July 4.

The organizers called upon Catholics to participate in a pledge to religious liberty and an appeal for the inclusion of a "conscience clause" for religious institutions and religious faithful to practice according to the moral tenets of one's religious faith.

The campaign was started by the USCCB in reaction to policies from the Obama Administration and some states on LGBTQ issues, adoption rules and the provision of artificial conception to Catholic employees, The USCCB in 2018 converted it into Religious Freedom Week.

== History ==
=== Dolan letter to Obama ===
On September 20, 2011, Archbishop Timothy Dolan of the Archdiocese of New York wrote a letter to US President Barack Obama about the 1996 Defense of Marriage Act (DOMA). DOMA had been passed by Congress during the presidency of George W. Bush, a Republican.

Dolan criticized the U.S. Department of Justice (DOJ) for refusing to defend from DOMA from legal challenges. Dolan told Obama that the DOJ was "...actively attacking DOMA's constitutionality", which would "...precipitate a national conflict between church and state of enormous proportions and to the detriment of both institutions." The Obama letter included a USCCB analysis that listed some examples of objectionable actions:

- A DOJ brief that called for the courts to strike down DOMA
- Support by the Obama Administration for adoption rights by same-sex couples in Catholic agencies
- A sensitivity training program for all federal employees that allegedly trampled on religious beliefs.

=== Ad Hoc Committee for Religious Liberty ===
Ten days later, Dolan established the Ad Hoc Committee for Religious Liberty within the USCCB, with Archbishop William Lori of the Archdiocese of Baltimore as its chair. In a speech to the American bishops in Rome on January 19, 2012, Pope Benedict XVI stated that the Obama Administration needed to respect "freedom of worship" and "freedom of conscience" amidst so-called "radical secularism".

The Ad Hoc Committee immediately started planning a mass action campaign on religious liberty for the summer of 2012. Bishop Thomas J. Paprocki of the Diocese of Springfield in Illinois, proposed the name Fortnight for Freedom. He also suggested starting the campaign on June 21, the feast days of the English lawyer Thomas More and Bishop John Fisher, both executed by King Henry VII of England

=== Start of campaign ===
The Ad Hoc Committee on April 12, 2012, issued a declaration calling for a nationwide Fortnight for Freedom campaign to defend religious liberty. The proclamation claimed that government was attacking religious freedom. It cited state statutes that allegedly prevented Catholic charities from serving the immigrant population and denied funding to Catholic adoption agencies that refused to allow the adoption of children by same-sex couples.

The Fortnight for Freedom campaign was to take place in dioceses and parishes across the country during the two weeks leading up to July 4, American independence day. The bishops urged American Catholics to study the issue, pray on it and take direct action. The declaration read:

The Constitution is not for Democrats or Republicans or Independents. It is for all of us, and a great nonpartisan effort should be led by our elected representatives to ensure that it remains so."

The Fortnight for Freedom campaign began on June 21, 2012, with the celebration of a mass at the Basilica of the National Shrine of the Assumption of the Blessed Virgin Mary in Baltimore. The organizers chose that venue because the Archdiocese of Baltimore because Baltimore was the first diocese opened in the new United States in 1789. The campaign ended with a mass at the National Shrine of the Immaculate Conception in Washington, D.C., on July 4. Over 70 American dioceses participated in the first in Fortnight for Freedom. A flier distributed to parishes during the 2012 Fortnight campaign included these claims,

"New York City's push to prevent congregations from holding prayer services in public schools; some states’ termination of contracts with Catholic Charities because the organization will not place adoptive children with same-sex couples; and Catholic organizations’ losing contracts to fight human trafficking because they will not refer victims for abortions or contraception."

=== End of campaign ===
The USCCB sponsored Fortnight for Freedom yearly until 2018. Over the years, opening and closing masses were celebrated in Boston, St. Louis, and Kansas City, as well as in Baltimore and Washington D.C. The archbishops celebrating the masses included Cardinal Donald Wuerl, Cardinal Seán O'Malley and Archbishop Joseph Kurtz.

In 2018, the USCCB replaced Fortnight for Freedom with Religious Freedom Week, which runs each year from June 22 to June 29.

== Press coverage ==
According to the New York Times on April 12, 2012, the Fortnight For Freedom campaign was part of an extended effort by the USCCB to make religious freedom an issue of public debate, an effort that the Times said "has not yet galvanized the Catholic laity and has even further polarized the church's liberal and conservative flanks."

The Los Angeles Times, in a June 10, 2012 article, set Fortnight For Freedom in the context of the Vatican's censure of American nuns, the priest sex-abuse scandal and the healthcare-related lawsuit against the federal government. It also spoke about previous efforts by the bishops to be bipartisan. The article quoted Tim Byrnes, a political scientist aa Colgate University in Hamilton, New York:

"I think it's without doubt that they [bishops] are in the process of squandering that special position or role in American politics. The danger is that they'll be seen as social conservatives in league with a political party whose views on economic issues are not ones that the bishops share.... That doesn't strike me as a particularly good way of protecting the long-term viability of the church as a participant in American policy debates."

In a June 13, 2012 interview with the New York Times, Lori acknowledged that many people viewed Fortnight for Freedom as a partisan attack against Democrats. He also admitted that some Catholics had criticized the campaign. Lori commented:

"It is not about parties, candidates or elections, as some others have suggested.... In the face of this resistance, it may be tempting to get discouraged, to second-guess the effort, to soft-pedal our message. But instead, these things should prompt us to do exactly the opposite, for they show us how very great is the need for our teaching, both in our culture and even in our own church."

The Baltimore Sun on June 21, 2012, described the Fortnight for Freedom campaign at its launch: "The campaign focuses on a policy requiring religious institutions to offer birth control and other reproductive health care in employee health plans." The Sun quoted Lori:

"On Aug. 1, less than six weeks from now, the Health and Human Services mandate will go into effect. This will force conscientious private employers to violate their consciences by funding and facilitating through their employee health insurance plans reproductive 'services' that are morally objectionable."

The New York Times on June 22, 2012, noted that the USCCB had initiated Fortnight for Freedom due to a perceived attack on personal and public religious liberty. They cited the health benefits regulations established by the U.S. Department of Health and Human Services under the 2010 Affordable Health Care for America Act. These regulations required employers who provide health insurance for their employees to include coverage for artificial contraception, sterilization, and other forms of birth control. These requirements also applied to religious and charitable organizations and religiously affiliated hospitals and universities.

Writing in the National Catholic Reporter on July 13, 2012, the journalist John L. Allen Jr. contrasted the rhetoric of Fortnight for Freedom, which described a "war on religion" in America, with recent reports from China, India and Uzbekistan of Christians being "threatened, beaten, imprisoned and even murdered."

== Criticism and debate ==
Phil Attey, the head of Catholics for Equality, an LGBTQ rights group, called the campaign in June 2012 an "election-year political posturing.... It all has to do with their bigger push to be politically powerful again."

The head of Catholics United, a social service advocacy organization, protested outside the National Shrine during the June 21st mass in 2012. He commented:

"We love the church, but we hate the politics. We think that the decision to have a 'Fortnight for Freedom' really is a political attack on President Obama, and it doesn't reflect the moral priorities of Catholics sitting in the pews, who are really more concerned about bread-and-butter issues."

A leader of a liberal Catholic group, Faith in Public Life, said in June 2012: "I think some of the alarmist rhetoric that some church leaders are using gives the impression that some bishops are quite happy making this part of a Republican campaign." He feared the bishops would be seen as "the Republican Party at prayer".
