= Joseph Alphonse McNicholas =

American prelate

His Excellency, The Most Reverend Joseph Alphonse McNicholas
- Bishop of Springfield in Illinois titular bishop of Scala
- See: Diocese of Springfield in Illinois
- In office: September 3, 1975 - April 17, 1983
- Predecessor: William Aloysius O'Connor
- Successor: Daniel L. Ryan
- Other posts: Auxiliary Bishop of St. Louis; 1969 to 1975

Orders
- Ordination: June 7, 1949 by Joseph Ritter
- Consecration: March 25, 1970 by John Carberry

Personal details
- Born: January 23, 1923 St. Louis, Missouri, US
- Died: April 17, 1983 (aged 60)
- Denomination: Roman Catholic
- Education: Cardinal Glennon College; Kenrick Seminary
- Motto: I come to serve

Joseph Alphonse McNicholas (January 13, 1923 – April 17, 1983) was an American prelate of the Roman Catholic Church. He served as the sixth bishop of the Diocese of Springfield in Illinois from 1975 to until his death in 1983. He previously served as an auxiliary bishop of the Archdiocese of St. Louis in Missouri from 1969 to 1975.

== Biography ==
=== Early life ===
Joseph McNicholas was born on January 23, 1923, in St. Louis, Missouri. He attended Cardinal Glennon College in Shrewsbury, Missouri, and Kenrick Seminary in St. Louis. He was ordained to the priesthood in St. Louis on June 7, 1949 by Cardinal Joseph Elmer Ritter. After his ordination, McNicholas' first assignment was as an assistant pastor at the Old Cathedral of St. Louis Parish. He was transferred in 1955 to Most Holy Name of Jesus Parish in St. Louis as a part time associate pastor while studying for his Master of Social Work degree at St. Louis University.

=== Auxiliary Bishop of St. Louis ===
On January 31, 1969, McNicholas was appointed as an auxiliary bishop of St. Louis and titular bishop of Scala by Pope Paul VI. He received his episcopal consecration at the Cathedral of Saint Louis in St. Louis on March 25, 1969, from Cardinal John Carberry, with Archbishop Leo Byrne and Bishop Charles Helmsing serving as co-consecrators.As auxiliary bishop, McNicholas also served as pastor of the Old Cathedral of St. Louis Parish, and was active in social welfare and youth programs.

=== Bishop of Springfield in Illinois ===
Pope Paul VI appointed McNicholas as bishop of Springfield in Illinois on July 22, 1975.He was installed by Cardinal John Cody on September 3, 1975. He launched a visitation of churches, missions, schools, hospitals, the orphanage, and homes for senior citizens. He hosted the first Midwest Regional Meeting of the St. Vincent de Paul Society to be held in downstate Illinois, and in 1978 appointed the first nun to the position of superintendent of Catholic schools. He also renamed the diocesan newspaper as Time and Eternity.

Joseph McNicholas died on April 17, 1983, from a heart attack at age 60.

Catholic Church titles
| Preceded by William Aloysius O'Connor | Bishop of Springfield in Illinois; 1975—1983 | Succeeded by Daniel L. Ryan |
| Preceded by – | Auxiliary Bishop of St. Louis; 1969–1975 | Succeeded by – |
