= Peter Joseph Baltes =

19th-century Catholic bishop

His Excellency, The Right Reverend Peter Joseph Baltes
- Bishop of Alton
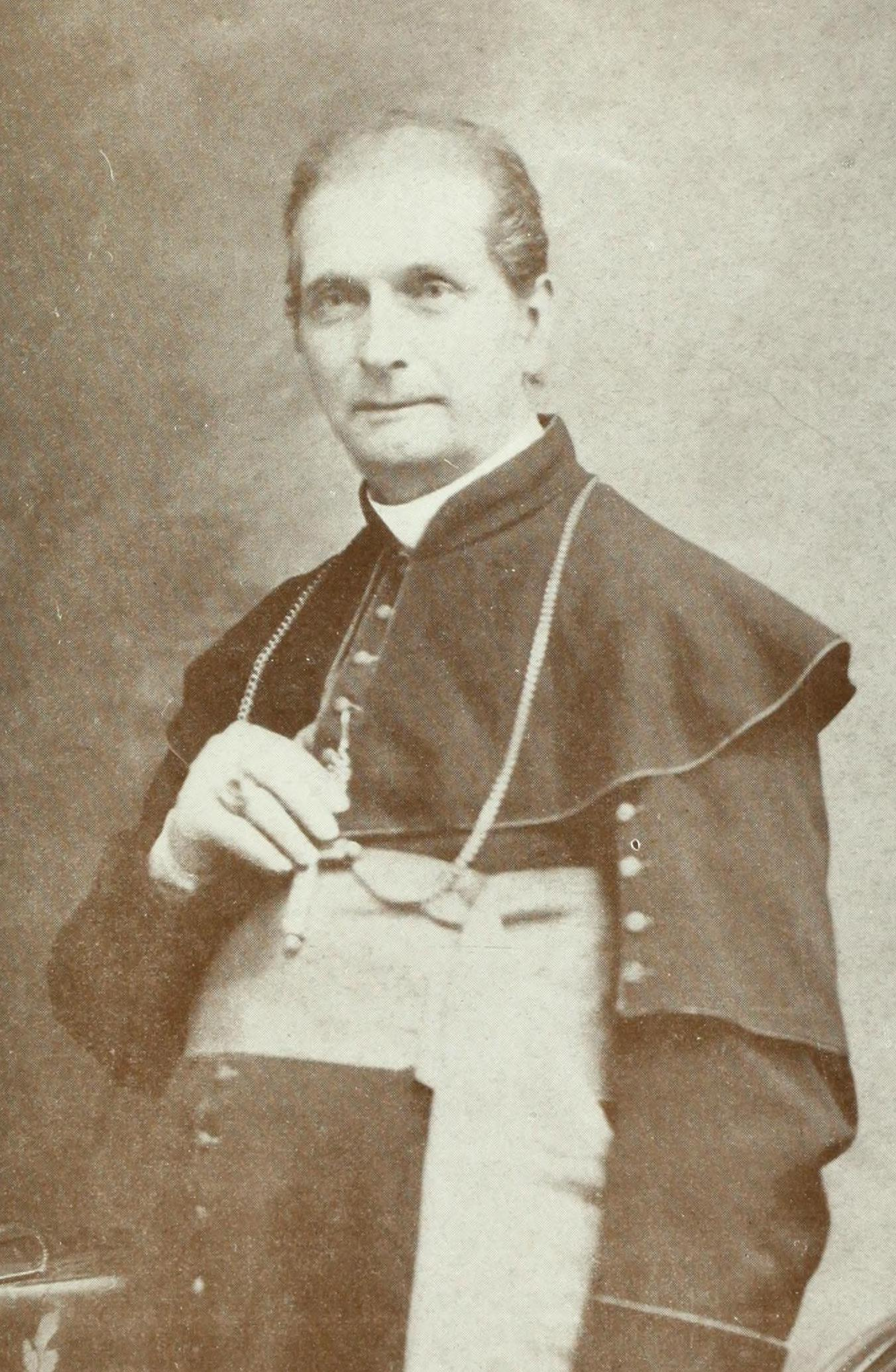
- Diocese: Diocese of Alton
- Appointed: September 24, 1869
- Predecessor: Henry Damian Juncker
- Successor: James Ryan

Orders
- Ordination: May 21, 1853 by Ignace Bourget
- Consecration: January 23, 1870 by John Luers

Personal details
- Born: April 7, 1827 Ensheim, Rhenish Palatinate, Kingdom of Bavaria (now Germany)
- Died: February 15, 1886 (aged 58) Alton, Illinois, USA
- Denomination: Roman Catholic Church
- Education: College of the Holy Cross; Saint Mary of the Lake Seminary; Grand Seminary of Montreal

Peter Joseph Baltes (April 7, 1827 – February 15, 1886) was a German-born American prelate of the Catholic Church. He served as bishop of Alton in Illinois from 1870 until his death in 1886.

== Biography ==
=== Early life ===
Peter Bates was born on April 7, 1827, in Ensheim, Rhenish Palatinate in the Kingdom of Bavaria (today a part of Germany). He was the fourth child of the carpenter and tinsmith Andreas Baltes and his wife Susanna née Walljan. In 1833, the family emigrated to the United States, settling in Oswego, New York.

After attending the College of the Holy Cross in Worcester, Massachusetts, to study classics, Baltes entered Saint Mary of the Lake Seminary in Chicago, Illinois. He completed his studies for the priesthood at the Grand Seminary of Montreal in Montreal, Quebec.

=== Priesthood ===
Baltes was ordained to the priesthood in Montreal for the Diocese of Chicago on May 21, 1853. After his ordination, Baltes returned to Chicago, where he received a pastoral assignment to a parish in Waterloo, Illinois.

In 1855, Baltes was incardinated, or transferred, to the Diocese of Quincy, with a pastoral assignment at a parish in Belleville, Illinois. While in Belleville, he placed both the local parochial school and the Young Ladies' Academy of the Immaculate Conception under the care of the School Sisters of Notre Dame, He also constructed St. Peter's Church in Belleville. In a reorganization in 1857, Belleville became part of the new Diocese of Alton and Baltes was incardinated there.

In 1866, Bishop Henry Juncker named Baltes as vicar general of Alton. He attended the Second Plenary Council of Baltimore that year with Juncker. Following Juncker's death in October 1868, Baltes became apostolic administrator of the diocese. In 1868 or 1869, he persuaded the Illinois General Assembly to pass a law allowing Catholic congregations and institutions to incorporate.

=== Bishop of Alton ===
On September 24, 1869, Baltes was named the second bishop of Alton by Pope Pius IX. He received his episcopal consecration on January 23, 1870, from Bishop John Luers, assisted by Bishops Augustus Toebbe and Patrick Ryan as co-consecrators, at St. Peter's in Belleville, Illinois. As bishop, Baltes quickly instituted a constitution that outline practices with all the parishes.

In 1870, Baltes issued a pastoral letter criticizing the Freeman Journal, a Pittsburgh Catholic newspaper that supported the rights of priests. He said that by allegedly supporting discord between priest and their bishops, the Journal editors and readers were opening themselves up to divine punishment. Baltes issued another pastoral letter in 1879 that banned Catholics in his diocese from reading newspapers or journals that criticized the Catholic Church. The ban on the Freeman Journal was rescinded a few years later.

Baltes held annual spiritual retreats with his clergy. Contemporary accounts described him as an enthusiastic teacher, a tough disciplinarian and a strong defended of church doctrine. He banned contemporary music from church services, replacing it with the Gregorian chant and Cecilian music. By the end of his tenure, the diocese included 109,000 Catholics, 177 priests, 126 parishes and 77 missions, 13 hospitals, three orphanages, two homes for the elderly, two men's colleges, a boys' high school, nine girls' academies, and 102 parochial schools with 11,000 students.

In 1878, Baltes went to Germany to visit Ensheim. While there, he celebrated a mass in the Speyer Cathedral in Speyer, Germany. In January 1884, 27 nuns died in a fire at the Convent of the Sisters of Notre Dame in Belleville. Baltes attended the funeral mass there, but was too sick to celebrate it. Long suffering from diseases of the kidneys, bladder, and liver, Baltes was also unable to attend the Third Plenary Council of Baltimore in 1884.

=== Death ===
In the summer of 1885, Baltes traveled to a resort on the Atlantic coast at his doctor's recommendation. However, he soon became incapacitated and spent two months in hospitals in New York City and Montreal. In September 1885, Baltes was well enough to return to Alton, but then suffered a relapse. He recovered again, but on February 12, 1886, became very ill.

Peter Baltes died from liver disease on February 15, 1886, in Alton at age 58.

Catholic Church titles
Preceded by Henry Damian Juncker	Bishop of Alton; 1876–1878	Succeeded by James Ryan
