= James Ryan (bishop) =

American Catholic bishop (1848–1923)

The Right Reverend James Ryan
- Bishop of Alton
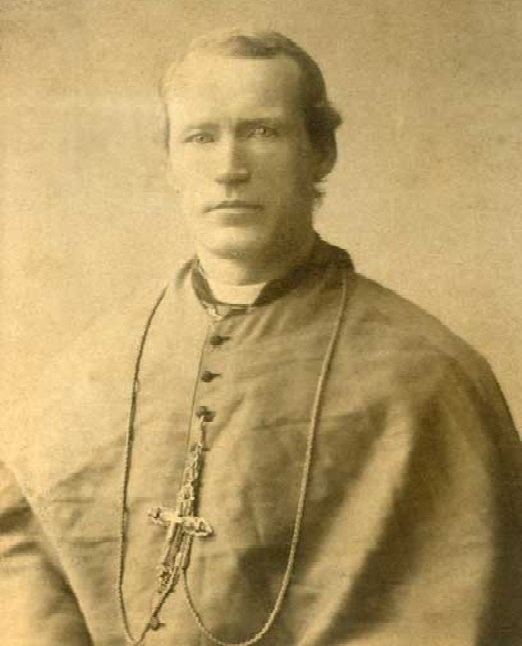
- Church: Catholic Church
- Diocese: Alton
- Appointed: February 28, 1888
- Term ended: July 2, 1923
- Predecessor: Peter Joseph Baltes
- Successor: James Aloysius Griffin

Orders
- Ordination: December 24, 1871 by William George McCloskey
- Consecration: May 1, 1888 by John Lancaster Spalding

Personal details
- Born: June 17, 1848 Farneybridge, County Tipperary, Ireland
- Died: July 2, 1923 (aged 75) Alton, Illinois, U.S.
- Motto: Ave maris stella (Latin for 'Hail, star of the sea')

James Ryan (June 17, 1848 – July 2, 1923) was an American Catholic prelate who served as the third Bishop of Alton from 1888 until his death in 1923.

== Biography ==
=== Early life and education ===
A native of Ireland, James Ryan was born on June 17, 1848, in Farneybridge, near Thurles in County Tipperary. He was the son of Denis and Ellen (née Stapleton) Ryan. At the age of seven, he came with his family to the United States, settling in Louisville, Kentucky. His father died shortly afterwards.

At the age of fourteen, Ryan was enrolled by Bishop Martin John Spalding of Louisville into St. Thomas College at Bardstown, where he studied for six years. He then began his studies for the priesthood, first at St. Joseph Seminary in Bardstown and then at Preston Park Seminary (now Bellarmine University) in Louisville.

=== Priesthood ===
Ryan was ordained a priest on December 24, 1871, by Bishop William George McCloskey in Louisville. He then successively served as an assistant at St. Thomas Church in Bardstown, pastor of St. Martin Church in Flaherty, and pastor of St. James Church in Elizabethtown. From 1874 to 1878, he was a professor at St. Joseph Seminary in Bardstown.

In 1878, following the creation of the Diocese of Peoria in Illinois, Ryan joined the new diocese. He served at Wataga and Danville before becoming pastor of St. Columba Church in Ottawa.

=== Bishop of Alton ===
On February 28, 1888, Ryan was appointed the third Bishop of Alton by Pope Leo XIII. He received his episcopal consecration on the following May 1 from Bishop John Lancaster Spalding, with Bishops McCloskey (who had ordained him a priest) and John Janssen serving as co-consecrators.

At the beginning of Ryan's 35-year tenure, the Diocese of Alton contained 201 churches, 180 priests, and 100 parochial schools. By the end of his tenure, there were 161 churches, 212 priests, and 64 parochial schools to serve a Catholic population of 87,000. One of his most significant accomplishments was the construction of a new orphanage, which opened a month after his death.

Ryan was strongly opposed to the appointment of an Apostolic Delegate in the United States. The Holy See found his communications on the matter to be so offensive that Cardinals Mariano Rampolla and Mieczysław Halka-Ledóchowski wrote to Cardinal James Gibbons in January 1893, demanding that Ryan issue an apology.

=== Death ===
Ryan died in Alton on June 2, 1923, at the age of 75. At the time of his death, he was the longest-serving American Catholic bishop.

Catholic Church titles
| Preceded by Peter Joseph Baltes | Bishop of Alton; 1888—1923 | Succeeded by James Aloysius Griffin |
