= James Aloysius Griffin =

American prelate

His Excellency, The Most Reverend James Aloysius Griffin
- Bishop of Springfield in Illinois
- See: Diocese of Springfield in Illinois
- In office: February 25, 1924 - August 5, 1948
- Predecessor: James Ryan
- Successor: William Aloysius O'Connor

Orders
- Ordination: July 4, 1909 by Giuseppe Ceppetelli
- Consecration: February 25, 1924 by George Mundelein

Personal details
- Born: February 27, 1883 Chicago, Illinois, US
- Died: September 5, 1948 (aged 65) Springfield, Illinois, US
- Denomination: Roman Catholic
- Education: St. Ignatius College; Propaganda College
- Motto: Fide et fortitudine (Faith and strength)

James Aloysius Griffin (February 27, 1883 – August 5, 1948) was an American prelate of the Roman Catholic Church. He served as bishop of the Diocese of Springfield in Illinois from 1924 until his death in 1948.

== Biography ==
=== Early life ===
James Griffin was born on February 27, 1883, in Chicago, Illinois to Thomas and Catherine (née Woulfe) Griffin. He attended St. Gabriel High School and St. Ignatius College, both in Chicago. He then went to Rome to study at the College of Propaganda, obtaining a Ph.D. in 1906 and a Doctor of Divinity degree in 1910. While in Rome, Griffin served as secretary to Cardinal Rafael Merry del Val.

=== Priesthood ===
Griffin was ordained to the priesthood in Rome for the Archdiocese of Chicago by Patriarch Giuseppe Ceppetelli on July 4, 1909. On his return to Chicago in 1910, Griffin was assigned as a curate at St. James' Parish in Chicago. In 1915, he was transferred to St. Brendan's Parish in Chicago. Griffin was named pastor in 1917 of Assumption Parish in Coal City, Illinois. He was transferred in 1913 to St. Mary's Parish in Joliet, Illinois, to serve as pastor.

=== Bishop of Springfield in Illinois ===
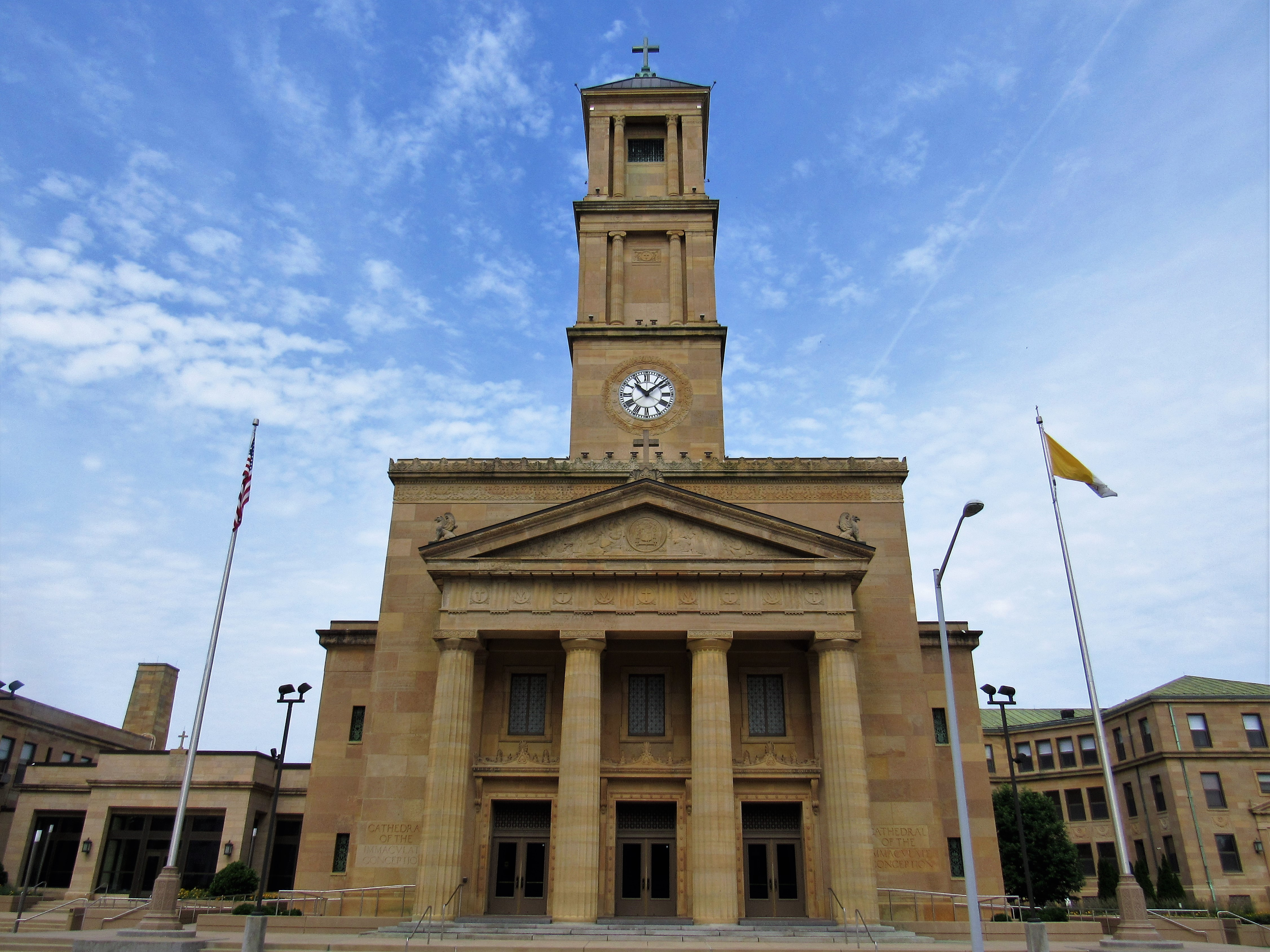
Cathedral of the Immaculate Conception, Springfield, Illinois (2018)

On November 10, 1923, Pope Pius XI suppressed the Diocese of Alton, replacing it with the Diocese of Springfield in Illinois, and appointed Griffin as the first bishop of the new diocese. He received his episcopal consecration at Holy Name Cathedral in Chicago on February 25, 1924, from Archbishop George Mundelein, with Bishops Samuel Stritch and Edward Hoban serving as co-consecrators.

According to author Peter R. D'Agostino, Griffin was an admirer of dictator Benito Mussolini and his Fascist regime in Italy. In a 1931 address to a Knights of Columbus group in Chicago, he praised Mussolini and delivered a roman salute, a trademark of the Fascist state.

Griffin dedicated the new Cathedral of the Immaculate Conception in Springfield in 1928. During his tenure as bishop, Griffin erected 51 new churches, schools, convents and charitable institutions; the total cost spent in his first ten years was close to $6.5 million. He established Marquette Catholic High School in Alton, Illinois, and Springfield Junior College in Springfield.

In 1939, Griffin joined Bishop John Gannon and Monsignor Michael Joseph Ready in a visit to Mexico to confer with Archbishop Luis Martínez, the archbishop of Mexico City. Since seminaries were illegal in Mexico at that time, Martinez was hoping to established a seminary for Mexican priests in Las Vegas, New Mexico.

Following the appointment of Dr. George D. Stoddard as president of the University of Illinois in 1945, Griffin condemned Stoddard's assertion in his book The Meaning of Intelligence that, "Man-made concepts, such as devils, witches, taboos, hellfire, original sin...and divine revelation...have distorted the intellectual processes of millions of persons." Griffin said, "We want to know what we're paying for...Thousands of [Dr. Stoddard's] future students believe in the objective validity of [original sin and hell]...He will evidently try to dispossess his charges of their feeble-mindedness." In response, Stoddard said he "should be much happier if the Bishop and his group read the whole book" and that, taken as a whole, it actually urged a "return to religion."

=== Death ===
James Griffin died in Springfield on August 5, 1948, at age 65. He is buried in one of five crypts of the Cathedral of the Immaculate Conception.

Catholic Church titles
Preceded by James Ryan	Bishop of Springfield in Illinois; 1924—1948	Succeeded by William Aloysius O'Connor
