= Henry Damian Juncker =

French-born prelate

His Excellency, The Right Reverend Henry Damian Juncker
- Bishop of Alton
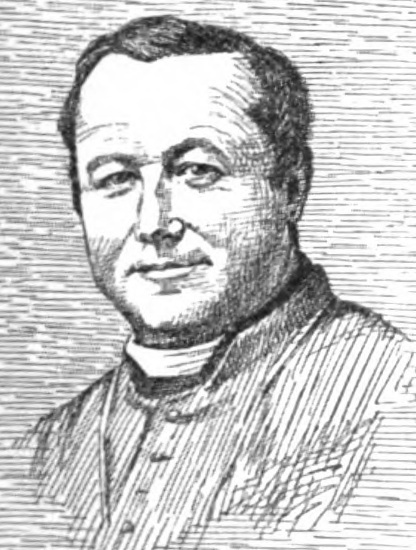
- See: Diocese of Alton
- Installed: April 26, 1857
- Term ended: October 2, 1868
- Predecessor: none
- Successor: Peter Joseph Baltes

Orders
- Ordination: March 16, 1834 by John Baptist Purcell
- Consecration: April 26, 1857 by John Baptist Purcell

Personal details
- Born: August 22, 1809 Fénétrange, Moselle, France
- Died: October 2, 1868 (aged 59) Alton, Illinois, USA
- Motto: Ave Maris Stella (Hail star of the sea)

Henry Damian Juncker (August 22, 1809 – October 2, 1868) was a French-born prelate of the Roman Catholic Church. He was the first bishop of the Diocese of Alton in Illinois, serving from 1857 until his death in 1868.

== Biography ==
=== Early life ===
Henry Juncker was born in Fénétrange, Moselle in France on August 22, 1809. While studying at the Pont-à-Mousson seminary in France, he decided to devote his life to the American missions, attaching himself to the Diocese of Cincinnati in Ohio. Juncker emigrated to the United States, completing his seminary studies in Cincinnati, Ohio. Contemporary accounts described him as a zealous catechism teacher to his students.

=== Priesthood ===
Juncker was ordained a priest by Bishop John Baptist Purcell on March 16, 1834. After his ordination, Juncker was sent to Columbus, Ohio to oversee construction of St. Remigius Church.

Juncker then served as pastor of Holy Trinity, a German-language parish in Cincinnati. In 1836, he was appointed pastor of St. Mary's Parish in Canton, Ohio. In 1846, he was named pastor of Emanuel Parish in Dayton, Ohio. While pastor at Emanuel, he visited many neighboring communities and German settlements to minister to Catholics there.

=== Bishop of Alton ===
On January 9, 1857, Juncker was appointed the first bishop of the newly erected Diocese of Alton—now the Diocese of Springfield in Illinois—by Pope Pius IX. He received his consecration at the Cathedral Basilica of Saint Peter in Chains in Cincinnati on April 26, 1857, from Purcell, with Archbishop John Henni and Bishop Joshua Young serving as co-consecrators. At the time of Juncker's arrival, the diocese contained 58 churches, 30 mission stations, 18 priests, and 50,000 Catholics. Realizing immediately that the new diocese needed more priests, he traveled to Europe in 1857 to recruit priests from France, Germany, Ireland and Italy for his diocese.

Juncker completed the first cathedral in the diocese in 1859, and founded two men's colleges, six girls' academies, a seminary, two hospitals, and one orphanage. By the time of his death, there were 125 churches, over 100 priests, and 80,000 Catholics. During one stay in Randolph County, a delegation from Red Bud, Illinois, asked Juncker to visit them. The townspeople said they had never seen a priest there. During his visit to Red Bud, Juncker heard confession from 1,000 Catholics and received a donation of land from a Protestant businessman for a new church.

When the American Civil War started in 1861, Juncker asked his parishioners to pray for peace. When the Union Army opened a medical camp for wounded soldiers in Cairo, Illinois, he sent priests and nuns there to provide support. Juncker attended the Second Plenary Council of American bishops in Baltimore, Maryland in 1866 and then went to Rome in 1867 to attend the Centenary of the Holy Apostles.

=== Death ===
In June 1868, Juncker became incapacitated by Illness. Henry Juncker died in Alton, Illinois, on October 2, 1868, at age 59. He was buried in a vault under his cathedral.

Catholic Church titles
Preceded by none	Bishop of Alton; 1857–1868	Succeeded by Peter Joseph Baltes
