= Thomas Paprocki =

American prelate of the Catholic Church (born 1952)

His Excellency, The Most Reverend Thomas Paprocki
- Bishop of Springfield in Illinois
- Church: Catholic Church; Latin Church
- Diocese: Springfield in Illinois
- Appointed: April 20, 2010
- Installed: June 22, 2010
- Predecessor: George Joseph Lucas
- Previous post: Auxiliary Bishop of Chicago (2003‍–‍2010)

Orders
- Ordination: May 10, 1978 by John Cody
- Consecration: March 19, 2003 by Francis George

Personal details
- Born: Thomas John Joseph Paprocki; August 5, 1952 (age 74) Chicago, Illinois, US
- Education: Niles College (BA); St. Mary of the Lake Seminary (STB, MDiv, STL); DePaul University (JD); Pontifical Gregorian University (JCL, JCD); Jagiellonian University; University of Notre Dame (MBA)
- Motto: Lex cordis caritas (Latin for 'The law of the heart is love')

Ordination history
History
Priestly ordination
- Ordained by: John Patrick Cody
Episcopal consecration
- Principal consecrator: Francis Eugene George
- Co-consecrators: Raymond Emil Goedert, Ricardo Watty Urquidi

Styles of Thomas Joseph Paprocki
- Reference style: His Excellency
- Spoken style: Your Excellency
- Religious style: Bishop

Thomas John Joseph Paprocki (born August 5, 1952) is an American prelate of the Catholic Church who has been serving as bishop of the Diocese of Springfield in Illinois since 2010. He previously served as an auxiliary bishop of the Archdiocese of Chicago in Illinois from 2003 to 2010.

== Biography ==
=== Early life ===
The third of nine children, Thomas Paprocki was born August 5, 1952, in Chicago, Illinois; he has six brothers and two sisters. A lifelong fan of hockey—who is sometimes referred to in the media as the "Holy Goalie"—he began playing at a young age in the basement of his father's drugstore and supports the Chicago Blackhawks professional hockey team. He graduated from Quigley Preparatory Seminary South in Chicago in 1970, and then entered Niles College in Chicago, where he obtained a Bachelor of Arts degree in 1974.

From 1974 to 1979, Paprocki studied at St. Mary of the Lake Seminary in Mundelein, Illinois, where he earned a Bachelor's in Sacred Theology (1976), Master's in Divinity (1978), and Licentiate in Sacred Theology (1979).

=== Priesthood ===
Paprocki was ordained to the priesthood at Saint Mary of the Lake for the Archdiocese of Chicago by Cardinal John Cody on May 10, 1978.

After his 1978 ordination, the archdiocese assigned Paprocki as associate pastor at St. Michael's Parish in South Chicago.. He also studied law at DePaul University College of Law in Chicago, earning his Juris Doctor degree in 1981. He founded the Chicago Legal Clinic in his parish to assist the working poor and disadvantaged. In 1983, Paprocki left St. Michael's to become parochial administrator of St. Joseph Parish in Chicago. Cardinal Joseph Bernardin named Paprocki as vice-chancellor of the archdiocese in 1985. Paprocki then went to Rome to study at the Pontifical Gregorian University. He received a Licentiate of Canon Law in 1989 and a Doctor of Canon Law degree in 1991.

Upon his return to Chicago, Bernardin appointed Paprocki as chancellor of the archdiocese in 1992. He became pastor of St. Constance Parish in Chicago in 2000. That same year, he spent time in Poland at the Jagiellonian University in Kraków studying Polish language and culture. In 2013, Paprocki received a Master of Business Administration degree from the University of Notre Dame in Notre Dame, Indiana.

The Chicago media started calling Paprocki the "Holy Goalie" in 2006 due to his participation in an amateur ice hockey league. He began playing hockey at a young age in the basement of his father's drugstore.

=== Auxiliary Bishop of Chicago ===
On January 24, 2003, Paprocki was appointed auxiliary bishop of Chicago and titular bishop of Vulturaria by Pope John Paul II. He received his episcopal consecration on March 19, 2003, from Cardinal Francis George, with bishops Raymond E. Goedert and Ricardo Urquidi serving as co-consecrators.

As an auxiliary bishop, Paprocki served as episcopal vicar for Vicariate IV, and as the cardinal's liaison for Polonia and for health and hospital affairs. Paprocki was also a board member of the Polish American Association and the Polish American Leadership Initiative. Paprocki has been accused of shielding at least three priests from sexual assault investigations.

== Bishop of Springfield ==
On April 20, 2010, Paprocki was appointed as bishop of Springfield in Illinois by Pope Benedict XVI. He was installed at the Cathedral of the Immaculate Conception in Springfield on June 22, 2010. In November 2010, he organized a conference on exorcism.

In April 2012, Paprocki was named as part of a three-member board of American Catholic bishops charged by the Vatican's Congregation for the Doctrine of the Faith (CDF) with a multi-year investigation into the U.S. Leadership Conference of Women Religious (LCWR). He coined the name of the Fortnight for Freedom, a campaign of the American bishops promoting their religious liberty agenda.

Paprocki is episcopal board chair for the Catholic Athletes for Christ, and is the author of Running for a Higher Purpose and Holy Goals for Body and Soul. Paprocki is a long-distance runner, having completed 24 marathons by 2018.

== Viewpoints ==
=== Abortion ===
In November 2008, Paprocki said, "If Catholic hospitals were required by federal law to perform abortions, we'd have to close our hospitals."

=== Communion for politicians ===
In February 2018, Paprocki officially upheld a previous decision to bar U.S. Senator Dick Durbin, a Catholic in his diocese, from receiving communion after Durbin voted against a 20-week abortion ban. He made the following statement:

In April 2004, Sen. Durbin's pastor, then Msgr. Kevin Vann (now Bishop Kevin Vann of Orange, CA), said that he would be reticent to give Sen. Durbin Holy Communion because his pro-abortion position put him outside of communion or unity with the Church's teachings on life. My predecessor, now Archbishop George Lucas of Omaha, said that he would support that decision. I have continued that position. The provision is intended not to punish, but to bring about a change of heart.

On June 6, 2019, Paprocki issued a decree officially barring Illinois House Speaker Michael Madigan and Illinois Senate President John Cullerton, both Catholics, from receiving communion. Paprocki said this decree was due to their roles in passing the Reproductive Health Act, which removes spousal consent and waiting periods for abortions. While singling out Madigan and Cullerton specifically, Paprocki also asked that other Catholic legislators who voted for the bill not present themselves for communion either, stating that they had "cooperated in evil and committed grave sin." Madigan stated that Paprocki had informed him earlier that he would be forbidden from taking communion if he permitted the House to debate and vote on the measure, but that he chose to do so.

=== Contraception ===
When Illinois Governor Rod Blagojevich issued an executive order in 2005 requiring all pharmacists in the state to dispense prescription contraceptives, Paprocki condemned the order in Blagojevich's presence, saying that he was "dismayed that our secular society has reached the point that individuals are being required by law to violate their personal religious beliefs in order to accommodate the selfish demands of special interest groups."

=== COVID-19 vaccines ===
After the University of Notre Dame announced a vaccine requirement for students in April 2021, Paprocki and Notre Dame Law Professor Gerard Bradley spoke out against the requirement. In a letter to campus newspaper The Observer, Paprocki and Bradley cited a statement from the Vatican's Congregation for the Doctrine of the Faith arguing that "persons may — not must — get vaccinated." They also requested, in light of vaccine testing on stem cell lines derived from aborted fetuses, that "Notre Dame should expand its understanding of 'religious' objectors to include those whose refusal to be vaccinated are rooted in moral considerations or other objections of conscience."

As Bishop of Springfield, Paprocki subsequently rejected vaccine requirements for clergy and employees within his diocese. He did, however, emphasize that "each person has a moral duty to act responsibly out of concern for his or her neighbor by diligently following other safety measures," irrespective of vaccination status.

=== Politics ===
In September 2012, Paprocki wrote a column in his diocese's Catholic Times newspaper about the upcoming US presidential elections. He declared that voting for a candidate who promotes actions or behaviors that are "intrinsically evil and gravely sinful" makes one "morally complicit" and places the eternal salvation of the soul in "serious jeopardy." His article went on at length discussing how in his view the Democratic Party embraced objectionable doctrines, such as abortion rights for women and same-sex marriage. Paprocki took notice of the Republican Party's support for capital punishment in murder cases, stating that this did not directly conflict with Church teaching. He also argued that party differences over caring for the poor and immigration were "prudential judgments about the most effective means of achieving morally desirable ends, not intrinsic evils."

Ahead of the 2016 elections, Paprocki denounced the Democratic Party for its "aggressive pro-abortion stance and activist agenda expanding lesbian, gay, bisexual, and transgender rights," adding that Republicans "have not fared very well in these same areas." He wrote that Democrats, who "articulate strong concern for the poor," have made little progress in fighting poverty. Paprocki said that Catholics could choose not to vote for either Hillary Clinton or Donald Trump.

=== LGBTQ rights ===
In November 2013, Paprocki said that Satan was behind the recent legalization of same-sex marriage in Illinois. He held an exorcism ceremony, reading an exorcism rite "in reparation for the sin of same-sex marriage".

On June 23, 2017, Paprocki instructed priests in his diocese to "deny Communion, last rites and funeral rites to people in same-sex marriages – unless they repent". He prohibited clergy and parish staff from either performing same-sex marriages or allowing wedding receptions to be hosted in any facilities or centres owned by the Catholic church. This was followed by strong criticism. Author Michael Sean Winters of the National Catholic Reporter called for Paprocki to be "sacked." Christopher Pett, president of DignityUSA, described the decree as "mean-spirited and hurtful in the extreme." Paprocki defended his position as "a rather straightforward application of existing Church teaching and canon law."

Paprocki criticized the Jesuit priest James Martin in 2017 for his outreach to the LGBTQ community. According to Paprocki, Martin "correctly expresses God's love for all people, while on the other, he either encourages or fails to correct behavior that separates a person from that very love. This is deeply scandalous in the sense of leading people to believe that wrongful behavior is not sinful."

In 2023, Paprocki wrote a column in First Things in which he said that Cardinal Robert W. McElroy's public pronouncements contradicted a "truth which is to be believed by divine and Catholic faith". Paprocki took issue with remarks made by McElroy in which he appeared to reject teaching that a Catholic must be in a state of grace to receive Communion. Paprocki also posed the question of an unnamed cardinal stating publicly that "homosexual acts are not sinful and same-sex unions should be blessed by the Church" as a further example of heterodox thought among Catholic leaders. "Until recently, it would be hard to imagine any successor of the apostles making such heterodox statements."

In 2023, Paprocki wrote a newspaper column defending the criminalization of homosexual acts in Uganda.

=== Sexual abuse scandal ===
In 2011, Paprocki said that the devil was the principal force behind the lawsuits against the Catholic Church by sexual abuse victims.

In response to 2018 allegations by Archbishop Carlo Maria Viganò that Francis covered up allegations of sexual abuse against former cardinal Theodore McCarrick, Paprocki called on all Vatican officials, including Francis, to "make public the pertinent files indicating who knew what and when...and provide the accountability that the Holy Father has promised." Paprocki criticized Francis for declining to answer a question about whether or not the accusations were true, saying, "Frankly, but with all due respect, that response is not adequate."

Paprocki called for "public prayers of repentance and acts of atonement" in 2018 after reports of widespread sexual abuse and coverup in the Catholic Church.

=== Worker's rights ===
Paprocki dissented from the amicus brief filed by the USCCB in support of public employee labor unions in the 2018 Janus v/ AFSCME case before the US Supreme Court. The USCCB had affirmed the Church's traditional teaching in support for unions, citing various Catholic documents. Paprocki disagreed with the USCCB, supporting a mandatory open shop for public employers. Paprocki has not been a visitor or spiritual guide at union halls but has collaborated with Legatus, an organization of Catholic corporate executives. He has also preached for lawyers and business executives.

Paprocki supported the Janus ruling to defend the conscience of the Catholic worker. He said that some public employee labor unions support what he considers as anti-Catholic stances; therefore, Catholic workers have the right to not support these groups. This distinction makes his opposition merely conditional; unions that are not contrary to Catholic teaching are not ruled out Ipso facto. Paprocki cites Pope Leo XIII's critical encyclical Rerum novarum paragraph 57 to show that Catholic support of organized labor has never been unconditional:

To sum up, then, We may lay it down as a general and lasting law that working men's associations should be so organized and governed as to furnish the best and most suitable means for attaining what is aimed at, that is to say, for helping each individual member to better his condition to the utmost in body, soul, and property. It is clear that they must pay special and chief attention to the duties of religion and morality, and that social betterment should have this chiefly in view; otherwise they would lose wholly their special character, and end by becoming little better than those societies which take no account whatever of religion. What advantage can it be to a working man to obtain by means of a society material well-being, if he endangers his soul for lack of spiritual food?

=== Liturgy ===
Paprocki criticized Traditionis custodes, a July 2021 motu proprio issued by Pope Francis which imposed restrictions on the Tridentine Mass, the Mass commonly offered before the reforms of the Second Vatican Council in the 1960s and which still takes place in some churches. "My assessment of this is that it was ill-advised," he said. "I don't know who was advising him. But to the extent he was trying to solve a problem here, the motu proprio stirred things up." Paprocki continued to allow parishes in his diocese to offer the older form of the Mass.

In July 2026, the Diocese of Springfield, under Paprocki's direction, instituted new guidelines for funerals. Under the regulations, the Diocese prohibited the practice of having a visitation immediately before the funeral Mass, recommending that they instead take place the day prior. It also prohibited the practice of laypeople delivering eulogies during the funeral. Paprocki explained that "too often people speaking at the end of a Funeral Mass say things that are very inappropriate," and required that only a priest or deacon speak regarding the deceased person during the Mass, while maintaining that words of remembrance from others could still take place at other times outside of the liturgy.

== Coat of arms ==
Coat of arms of Thomas Paprocki
Notes The coat of arms was designed and adopted when Paprocki was installed as Bishop of Springfield. Adopted June 22, 2010 Escutcheon Arms impaled. Dexter: Or a cross throughout azure; within the quarters four fountains, Proper, and at the center of the cross a crescent argent. Sinister: Vert upon a lattice Or an ogress charged with a cross pattée throughout Argent; upon a chief Gules two pan-balances of the second below a heart of the third, encircled by thorns and enflamed of the second. Motto LEX CORDIS CARITAS – The law of the heart is love – This phrase, which is based on the texts from Jeremiah (Jer. 31:33), Saint Paul's Epistle to the Romans (Rom. 13:10) and the Second Vatican Council's Dogmatic Constitution on The Church (Lumen Gentium (LG-#9)). Symbolism The arms of his jurisdiction, the Diocese of Springfield in Illinois, is seen in the dexter impalement (left side) of the design. The symbolism of the Diocese's arms is described here. The right side of the arms is his personal arms. On a green field is seen a golden (yellow) lattice, a device in which many individual slats form a single, integrated device of strength, far greater than all of its components. On the lattice is displayed an ogress (a black circular device) on which is displayed a silver (white) cross pattée. The cross is the "clan symbol" of the Paprocki family in Poland. The upper portion of the design, known as a "chief," is red and contains a Sacred Heart, in silver and gold. The Sacred Heart is placed above two pan-balances, the symbol of justice and law.

== See also ==
- Catholic Church hierarchy
- Catholic Church in the United States
- Historical list of the Catholic bishops of the United States
- List of Catholic bishops of the United States
- Lists of patriarchs, archbishops, and bishops

Catholic Church titles
Preceded by George Joseph Lucas	Bishop of Springfield in Illinois; 2010–present	Succeeded by Incumbent
Preceded by –	Auxiliary Bishop of Chicago; 2003–2010	Succeeded by –
