= Diocese of Springfield in Illinois =

Latin Catholic ecclesiastical jurisdiction in Illinois, United States

Coordinates: 39°46′59″N 89°39′34″W

Diocese of Springfield in Illinois Diœcesis Campifontis in Illinois
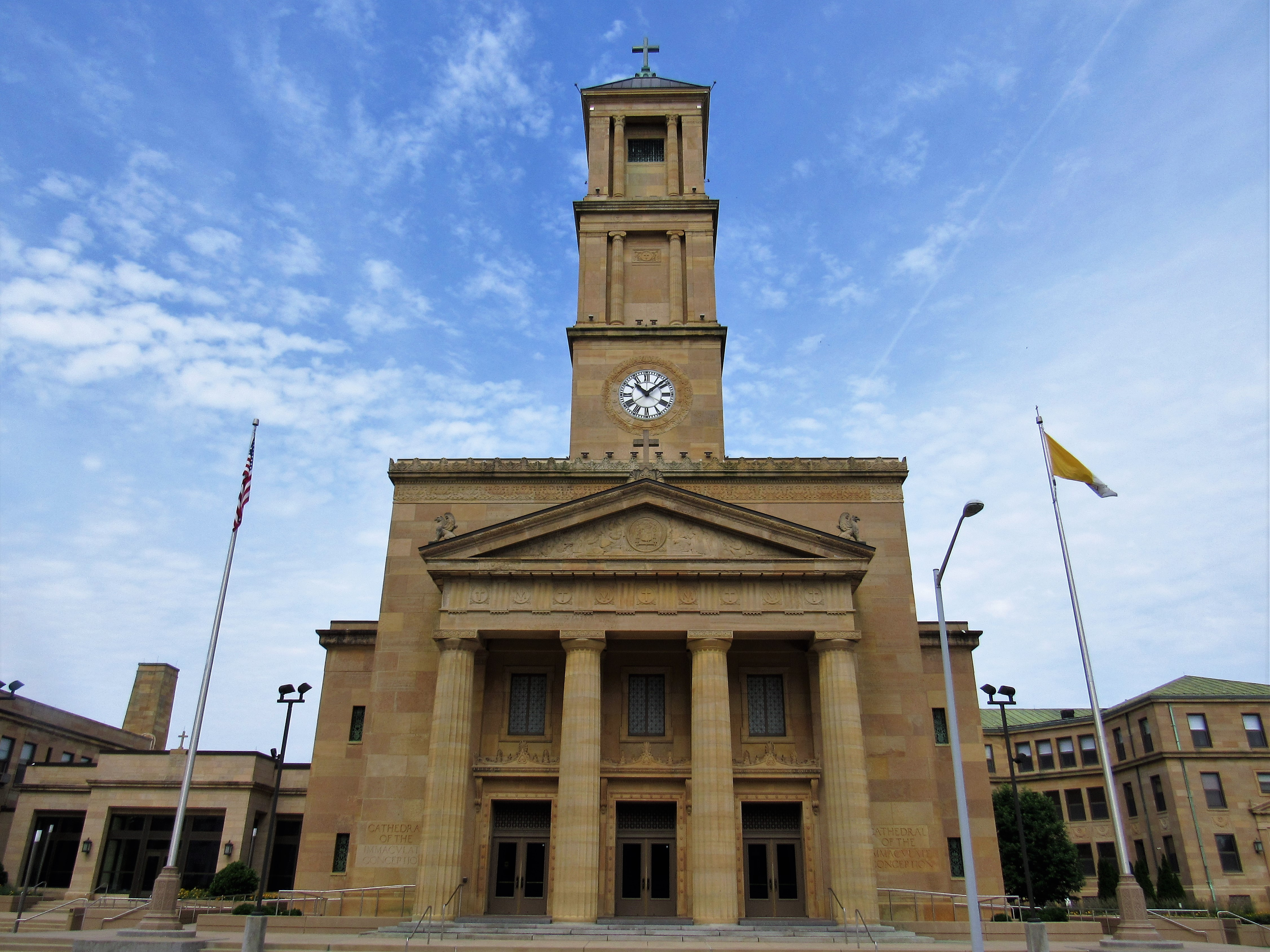
- Cathedral of the Immaculate Conception

- Coat of arms

Location
- Country: United States
- Territory: 28 counties across south central Illinois
- Ecclesiastical province: Chicago
- Deaneries: 5 Deaneries - Alton, Jerseyville, Mattoon, Quincy, Springfield

Statistics
- Area: 39,195 km^{2} (15,133 sq mi)
- Population: Total; Catholics: (as of 2010); 1,187,100; 145,189 (13%)
- Parishes: 129
- Schools: 36 elementary, 7 secondary

Information
- Denomination: Catholic
- Sui iuris church: Latin Church
- Rite: Roman Rite
- Established: July 29, 1853 as the Diocese of Quincy; January 9, 1857 as the Diocese of Alton; October 26, 1923 as the Diocese of Springfield in Illinois
- Cathedral: Cathedral of the Immaculate Conception
- Patron saint: Mary, the Immaculate Conception

Current leadership
- Pope: Leo XIV
- Bishop: Thomas J. Paprocki
- Metropolitan Archbishop: Blase J. Cupich
- Vicar General: David J. Hoefler
- Judicial Vicar: Dominic Vahling

Map
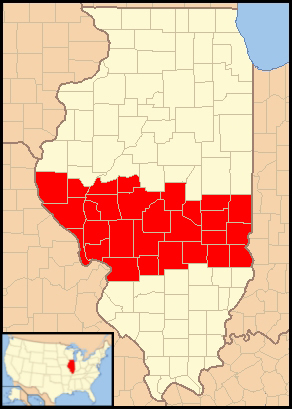

Website
- dio.org

The Diocese of Springfield in Illinois (Latin: Diœcesis Campifontis in Illinois) is a diocese of the Catholic Church in the capital city of Illinois in the United States. It is a suffragan diocese in the ecclesiastical province of the metropolitan Archdiocese of Chicago. The mother church is the Cathedral of the Immaculate Conception in Springfield.

== Territory ==
The Diocese of Springfield in Illinois is arranged according to counties, in turn organized into five deaneries: Alton, Jerseyville, Mattoon, Quincy, and Springfield. There are currently 129 parishes in the diocese. It is home to 14 religious houses. The diocese operates campus ministry centers at several colleges and universities.

== History ==
=== 1600 to 1800 ===
During the 17th century, present-day Illinois was part of the French colony of New France. The Diocese of Quebec, which had jurisdiction over the colony, sent numerous French missionaries to the region. It was estimated that 15,000 to 20,000 Native American converts and French trappers and settlers throughout the Illinois region were tended to by these Jesuit missionaries.

After the British took control of New France in 1763, the Archdiocese of Quebec retained jurisdiction over missions in the Illinois area. However, most of the French Catholics in the area migrated to Louisiana. In 1776, the newly declared United States claimed sovereignty over Illinois and the rest of the Midwest region.

After the American Revolution ended in 1783, Pope Pius VI erected in 1784 the Prefecture Apostolic of the United States, encompassing the entire territory of the new nation. In 1785, Bishop John Carroll sent his first missionary to Illinois. In 1787, the area became part of the Northwest Territory of the United States. Pius VI created the Diocese of Baltimore, the first diocese in the United States, to replace the prefecture apostolic in 1789.

=== 1800 to 1857 ===
With the creation of the Diocese of Bardstown in Kentucky in 1810, supervision of the Illinois missions shifted there. Catholic Irish and German immigrants started entering the Illinois region in the early 1800s. In 1827, the Diocese of St. Louis assumed jurisdiction over the western half of Illinois. In 1834, the Vatican erected the Diocese of Vincennes, which included both Indiana and eastern Illinois. The first Catholic church in Quincy, St. Peter's was opened in 1839 and the first church in Alton in 1843.In 1848, the first Catholic church in Springfield, St. John the Baptist, was constructed.

On July 29, 1853, Pope Pius IX erected the Diocese of Quincy, based in Alton, taking its territory from the Diocese of Chicago. He appointed Joseph Melcher of St. Louis to serve as bishop, both in Quincy and Chicago. Melcher refused the appointment. The pope did not appoint another bishop for Quincy.

=== 1857 to 1863 ===
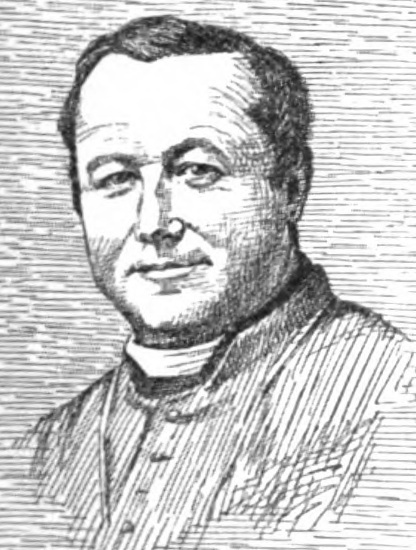
Bishop Junker (1886)

In 1857, Pius IX suppressed the Diocese of Quincy and erected the new Diocese of Alton, keeping the same boundaries. He appointed Reverend Henry Juncker of the Diocese of Cincinnati as the first bishop of Alton. At the time of Juncker's arrival, the diocese contained 58 churches, 30 mission stations, 18 priests, and 50,000 Catholics. Needing more priests, he traveled to Europe in 1857 to recruit clergy from France, Germany, Ireland, and Italy. The first Catholic church in Decatur, St. Patrick, opened in 1857.

Juncker completed the first cathedral in the diocese in 1859. He later founded six girls' academies, a seminary, two hospitals, and one orphanage. During one stay in Randolph County, a delegation from Red Bud, Illinois, asked Juncker to visit them. The townspeople said they had never seen a priest there. During his visit to Red Bud, Juncker heard confession from 1,000 Catholics and received a donation of land from a Protestant businessman for a new church. In 1860, the Franciscans opened St. Francis Solanus College in Quincy. Today, the college is Quincy University.

When the American Civil War started in 1861, Juncker asked his parishioners to pray for peace. When the Union Army opened a medical camp for wounded soldiers in Cairo, Illinois, he sent priests and nuns there to provide support.The Sisters of the Poor of St. Francis were among the groups serving at the medicamp; in 1866, after the end of the war, the sisters founded St. Mary's Hospital in Quincy.

=== 1863 to 1923 ===
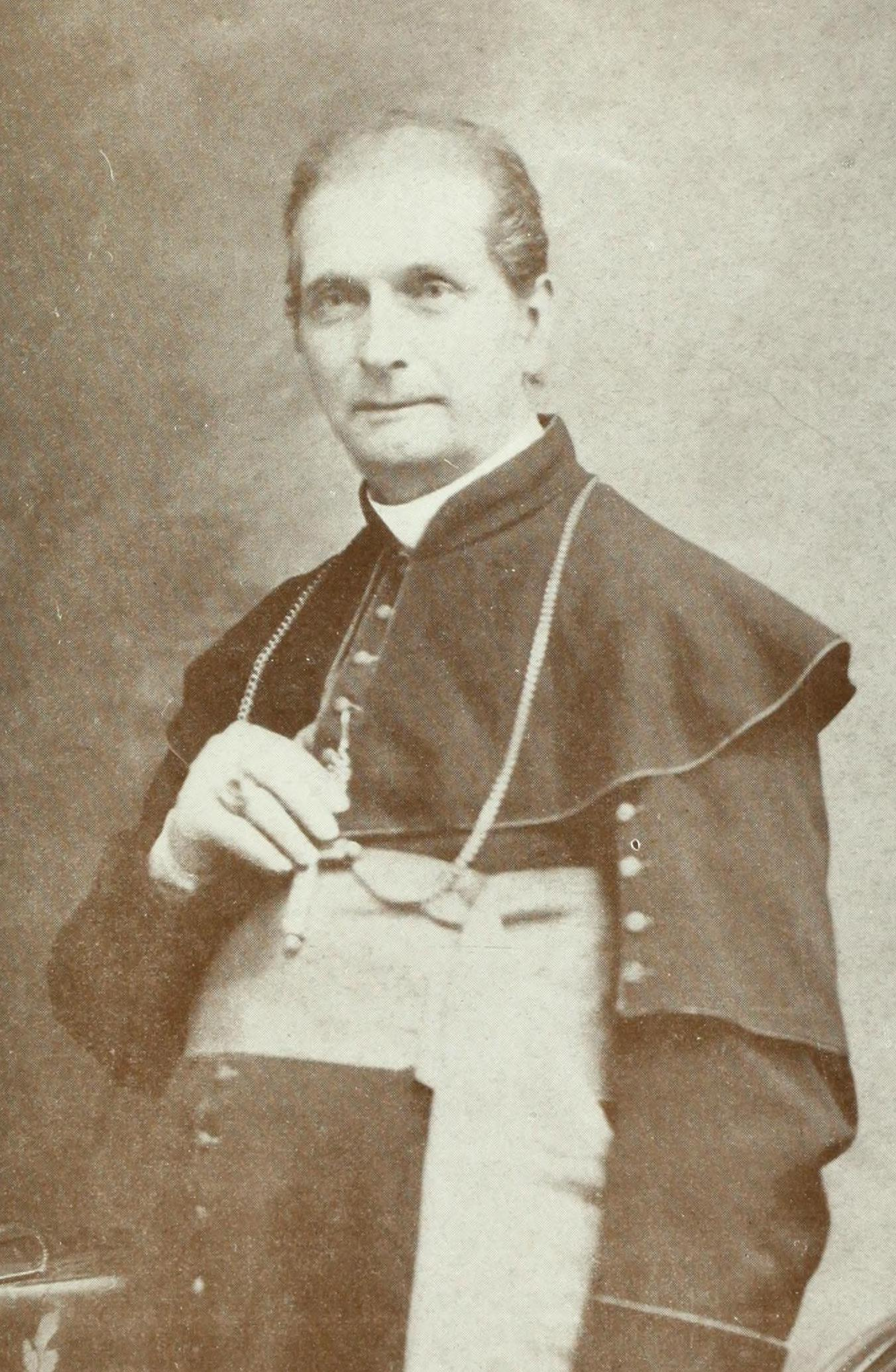
Bishop Baltes (1927)

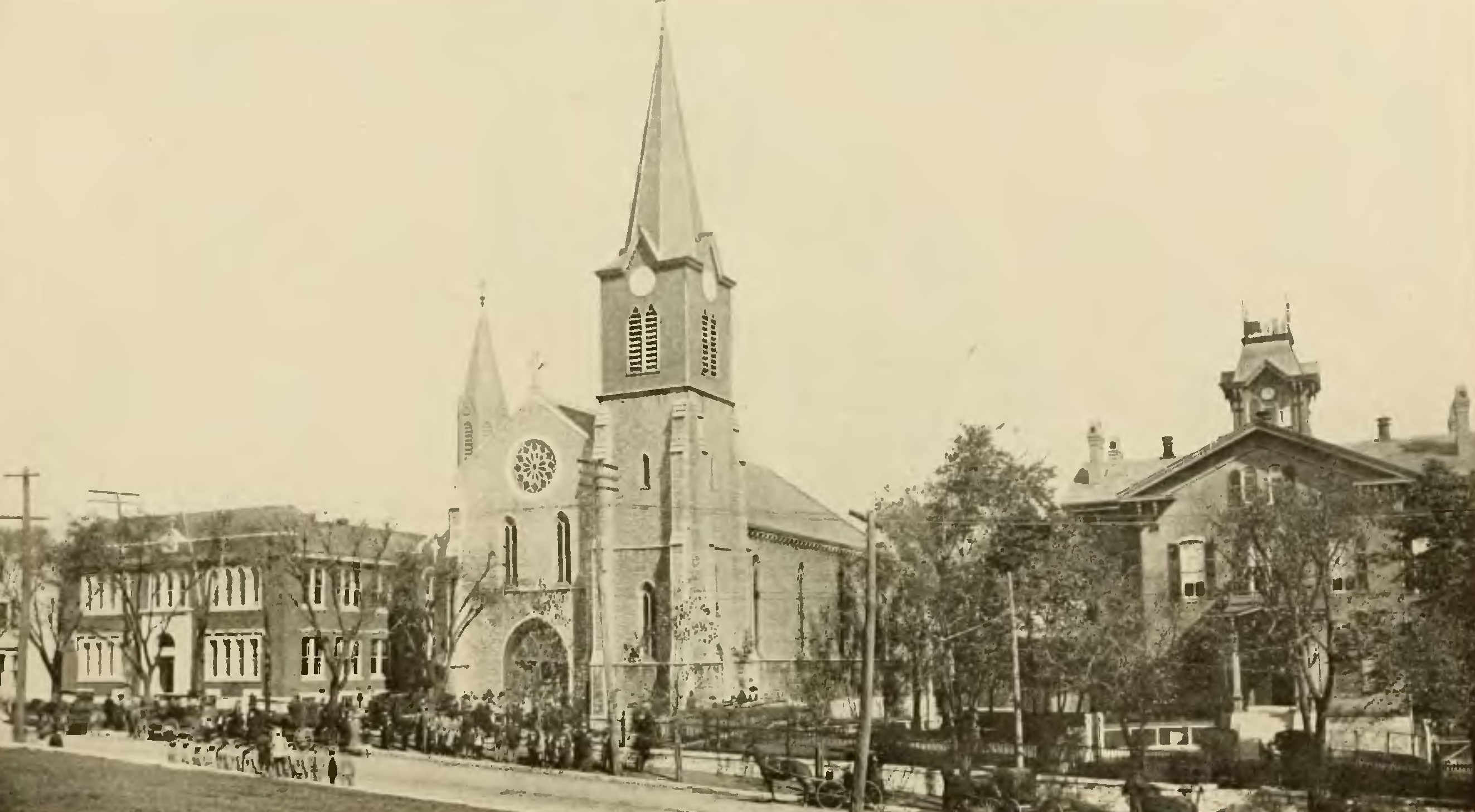
Cathedral of Saints Peter and Paul in Alton, Illinois (1912)

Juncker died in 1868. By the time of his death, the Diocese of Alton had 125 churches, over 100 priests, and 80,000 Catholics.

Pius IX appointed Peter Baltes of Chicago as the second bishop of Alton in 1869. Baltes quickly instituted a constitution that outlined practices with all the parishes. Baltes issued a pastoral letter in 1879 that banned Catholics in his diocese from reading newspapers or journals that criticized the Catholic Church. He banned contemporary music from church services, replacing it with the Gregorian chant and Cecilian music. The Hospital Sisters of St. Francis in 1878 established St. Mary's Hospital in Decatur. Today it is HSHS St. Mary's Hospital.

By the end of Baltes' tenure, the diocese included 109,000 Catholics, 177 priests, 126 parishes and 77 missions, 13 hospitals, three orphanages, two homes for the elderly, two men's colleges, a boys' high school, nine girls' academies, and 102 parochial schools with 11,000 students.

In January 1884, 27 religious sisters died in a fire at the Convent of the Sisters of Notre Dame in Belleville. Baltes attended the funeral mass there, but was too sick to celebrate it.

After Baltes died in 1886, Pope Leo XIII appointed James Ryan from the Diocese of Peoria as the third bishop of Alton. During his 35-year tenure, Ryan established 40 new churches and six hospitals; the Catholic population of the diocese increased from 70,000 to over 87,000. He held the first diocesan synod in February 1889.

=== 1923 to 1999 ===
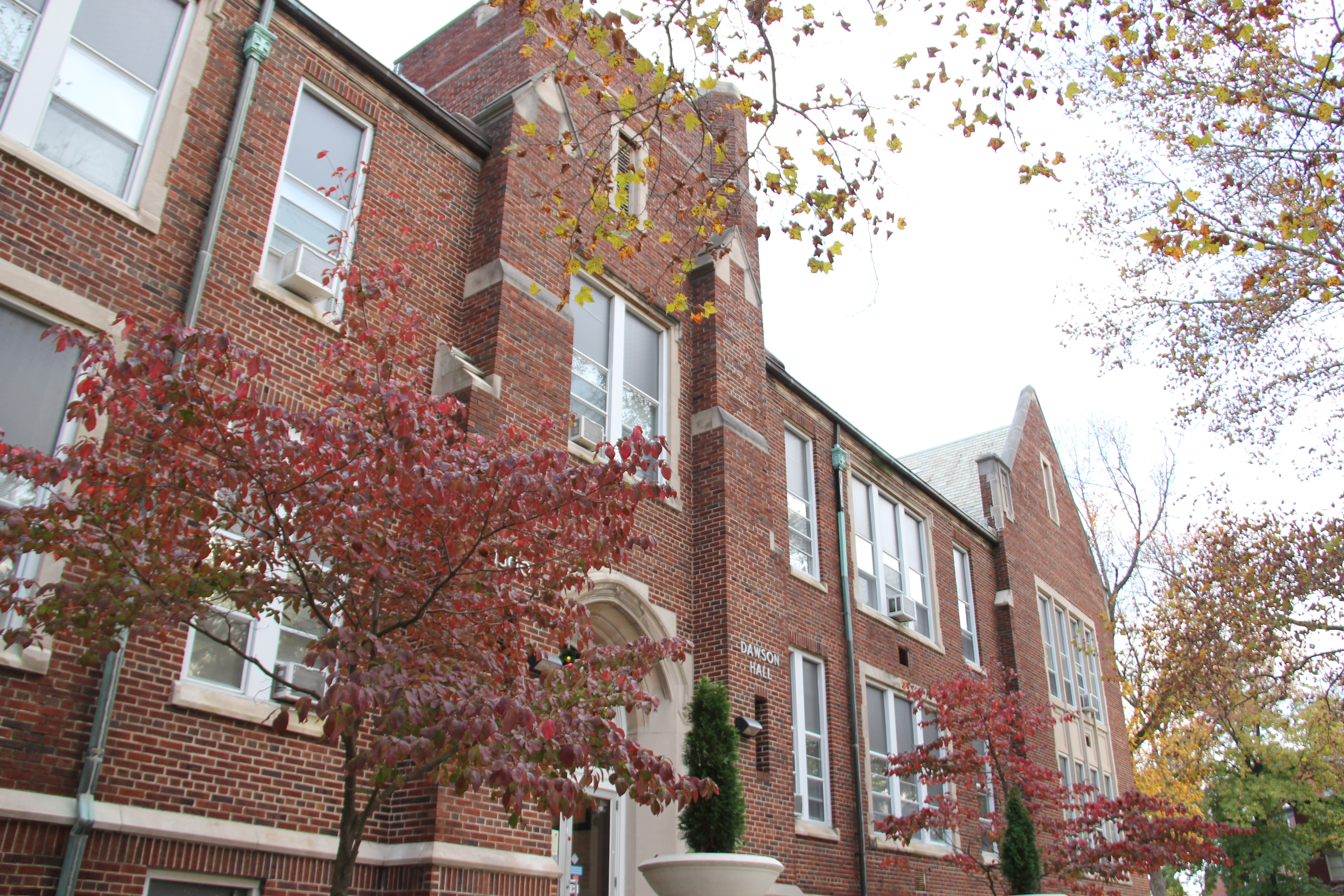
Benedictine University of Springfield, Springfield, Illinois (2016)

After James Ryan died in 1923, Pope Pius IX dissolved the Diocese of Alton and erected the Diocese of Springfield in Illinois in its place on October 26, 1923.

He appointed James Griffin of Chicago as the first bishop of the new diocese. Griffin dedicated the new Cathedral of the Immaculate Conception in Springfield in 1928. During his tenure as bishop, Griffin erected 51 new churches, schools, convents and charitable institutions; the total cost spent in his first ten years was close to $6.5 million. He established Marquette Catholic High School in Alton and Springfield Junior College in Springfield. Springfield Junior College is now Benedictine University at Springfield. Griffin died in 1948.

Pope Pius XII in 1948 appointed William O'Connor from Chicago as the second bishop of Springfield. O'Connor instituted the Confraternity of Christian Doctrine in 1950, initiated the diocesan development fund in 1952 for missionary work within the diocese, and founded the diocesan Latin School in 1954 for training young men preparing to enter the priesthood. He held diocesan synods in 1953 and 1963. After 27 years as bishop, O'Connor died in 1975.

The next bishop of Springfield was Auxiliary Bishop Joseph McNicholas of St. Louis, appointed by Pope Paul VI in 1975. He hosted the first Midwest Regional Meeting of the St. Vincent de Paul Society to be held in downstate Illinois, and in 1978 appointed the first nun to the position of superintendent of Catholic schools. He also renamed the diocesan newspaper as Time and Eternity.

After McNicholas' death in 1983, Pope John Paul II named Auxiliary Bishop Daniel L. Ryan of the Diocese of Joliet, as his successor. Ryan resigned as bishop of Springfield in 1999.

In 1985, police arrested Alvin J. Campbell, pastor of St. Maurice Church in Morrisonville on charges of sexually abusing a minor. Campbell had served in the US Army Chaplain Corps during the 1960s and early 1970s. When he applied to enter the Diocese of Springfield in Illinois in 1977, an Army official warned the diocese that Campbell had a moral problem with males. Later in 1985, Campbell pleaded guilty but mentally ill to having sexually abused seven teenagers between 1982 and 1985. He was sentenced to 14 years in prison. Removed from ministry in 1985, Campbell was laicized in 1992.

Walter Weerts pleaded guilty in 1986 to three counts of sexual abuse. Facing parent complaints about Weets starting in the 1960s, the diocese transferred him to different parishes. Weerts was sentenced to six years in prison and was laicized by the Vatican in 1989. Weerts later got a degree from New Mexico State University, then moved to South Florida, taking a position at Palm Beach Community College (now Palm Beach State College) teaching horticulture, and teaching at a local high school. School officials stated that Weerts denied being convicted of a crime on his application and were not made aware of his conviction when they called references, including the diocese. It was only in 1998 that the school was made aware of the conviction after students uncovered his past. Weerts fled the state in late 1998 shortly after his past was uncovered. In July 2004, Lucas approved a $1.2 million settlement to eight men who had been sexually abused as minors by Weerts. Having continued to confer confirmation and celebrate mass after his resignation as bishop in 1999, Bishop Daniel Ryan agreed in 2004 to suspend his public ministry. In 2006, an independent investigative report was commissioned by Bishop Lucas. In its report, the Special Panel on Clergy Misconduct declared that Ryan "engaged in improper sexual conduct and used his office to conceal his activities". Ryan also fostered "a culture of secrecy...that discouraged faithful priests from coming forward with information about misconduct" by other clergy in the diocese.

=== 1999 to 2009 ===
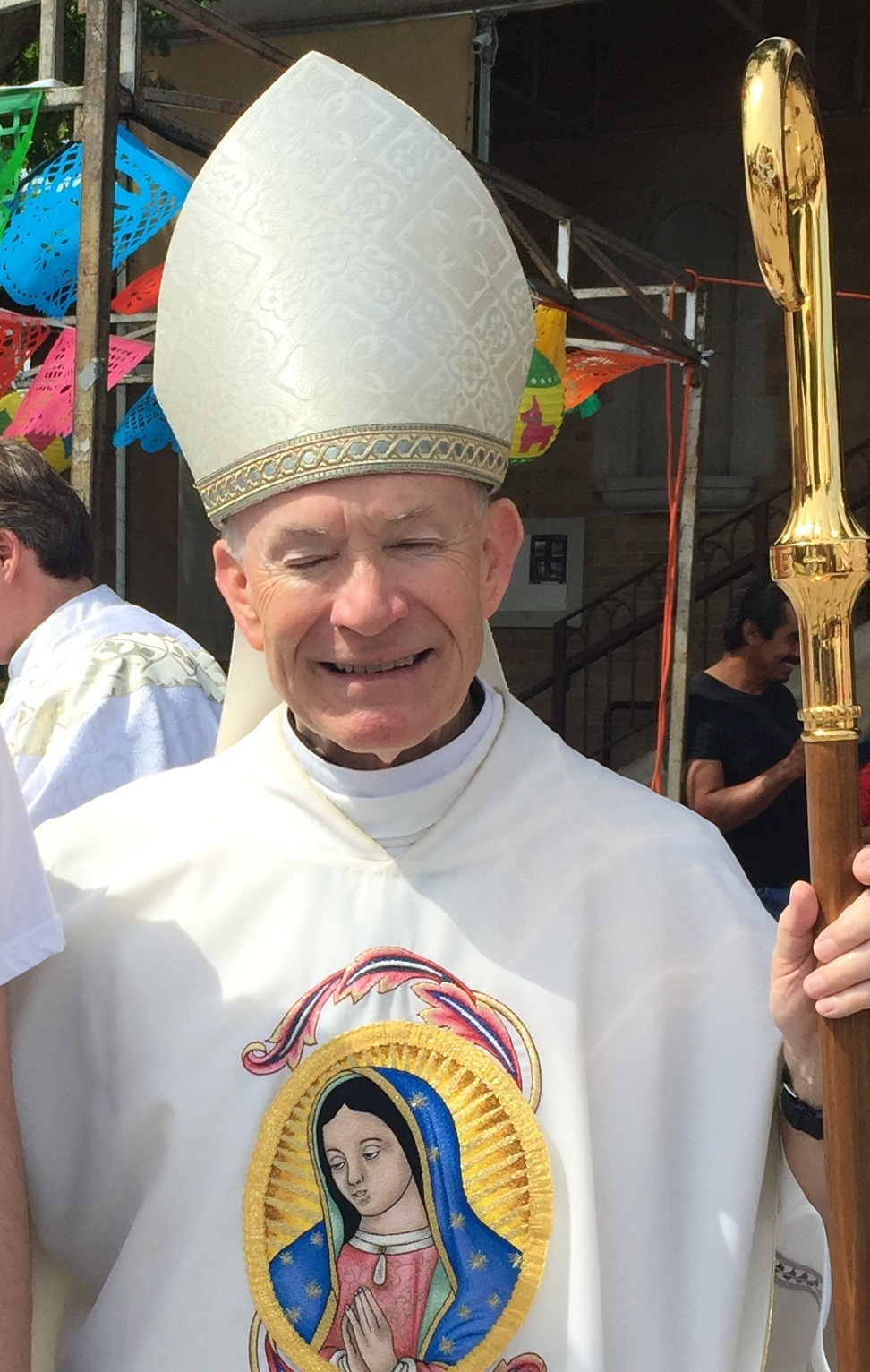
Archbishop Lucas (2023)

In 1999, Pope John Paul II appointed George Lucas of St. Louis as bishop of Springfield. In 2001, Lucas established a diaconate formation program for the diocese. The five-year program prepared men to become deacons was run by the diocesan Office for the Diaconate, in cooperation with Quincy University in Quincy. On June 24, 2007, Lucas ordained the first class of eighteen men.

In January 2002, Lucas launched an endowment/capital campaign called Harvest of Thanks, Springtime of Hope. The program raised over $22.1 million, used to support Catholic education, Catholic Charities, the formation of seminarians and deacon candidates, and the care of retired priests. Lucas spearheaded the Built in Faith campaign to raise the $11 million needed to restore the Cathedral of the Immaculate Conception. Lucas attended the cathedral dedication on December 2, 2009.

In 2009, Pope Benedict XVI named Lucas as archbishop of the Archdiocese of Omaha and appointed Bishop Thomas Paprocki, auxiliary bishop of Chicago, as Lucas' replacement.

=== 2010 to the present ===
On May 23, 2023, Illinois Attorney General Kwame Raoul released a multi-year investigation report that found over 450 clergy in Illinois abused nearly 2,000 minors since 1950.

Paprocki invited the Norbertines from St. Michael's Abbey in California to establish a community in the diocese. The Norbertines established the Corpus Christi Priory on July 1, 2023, to be the home of the Evermode Institute.

== Statistics ==
As of 2023:

- 123,706 Catholics
- 129 parishes
- 72 diocesan priests (active and retired)
- 35 religious priests
- 14 religious brothers
- 395 women religious
- 54 Permanent deacons

As of 2007:

- 151,601 Catholics
- 132 parishes
- 87 active priests; 62 religious institute priests
- 122 diocesan priests (including retired and serving outside the diocese)
- 6 Catholic hospitals

== Bishops ==
=== Bishop Elect of Quincy ===
Joseph Melcher (Appointed 1853; did not take effect); appointed Bishop of Green Bay

=== Bishops of Alton ===
1. Henry Damian Juncker (1857–1868)
2. Peter Joseph Baltes (1870–1886)
3. James Ryan (1888–1923)

=== Bishops of Springfield in Illinois ===
1. James Aloysius Griffin (1923–1948)
2. William Aloysius O'Connor (1948–1975)
3. Joseph Alphonse McNicholas (1975–1983)
4. Daniel L. Ryan (1983–1999)
5. George J. Lucas (1999–2009), appointed Archbishop of Omaha
6. Thomas J. Paprocki (2010–present)

=== Other diocesan priests who became bishops ===
- John Janssen, appointed Bishop of Belleville on 28 Feb 1888
- John Baptist Franz, appointed Bishop of Dodge City on 27 May 1951 and later Bishop of Peoria on 8 Aug 1959
- Victor Hermann Balke, appointed Bishop of Crookston on 7 Jul 1976
- Kevin Vann, appointed Coadjutor Bishop and Bishop of Fort Worth on 17 May 2005 and later Bishop of Orange on 21 Sep 2012
- Carl A. Kemme, appointed Bishop of Wichita on 20 Feb 2014

== Education ==
As of 2026, the Diocese of Springfield in Illinois has 36 elementary/middle schools and seven high schools.

=== High schools ===
- Father McGivney Catholic High School – Glen Carbon
- Marquette Catholic High School – Alton
- Quincy Notre Dame High School – Quincy
- Routt Catholic High School – Jacksonville
- Sacred Heart-Griffin High School – Springfield
- St. Anthony High School – Effingham
- St. Teresa High School – Decatur

=== University ===
Quincy University – Quincy

== Arms ==
Coat of arms of Diocese of Springfield in Illinois
Notes Arms were designed by Pierre de Chaignon la Rose for Bishop Griffin upon the erection of the Diocese Adopted 1923 Escutcheon These arms are composed of a gold field with a blue cross. Each quarter of the cross contains a roundel of alternating blue and silver wavy bars. A roundel of this type is known heraldically as a "fountain." The center of the cross displays a silver crescent. Symbolism As stated by Pierre de Chaignon la Rose, who designed the arms, "The Diocese bears a cross of blue on gold, the old colors of France, in honor of Marquette and Joliet, the first missioners in the region. The heraldic 'fountain' or springs express the name, and the crescent of the Immaculate Conception indicates the dedication of the Cathedral Church."
