= Cathedral of the Immaculate Conception (Springfield, Illinois) =

Catholic cathedral in Illinois, US

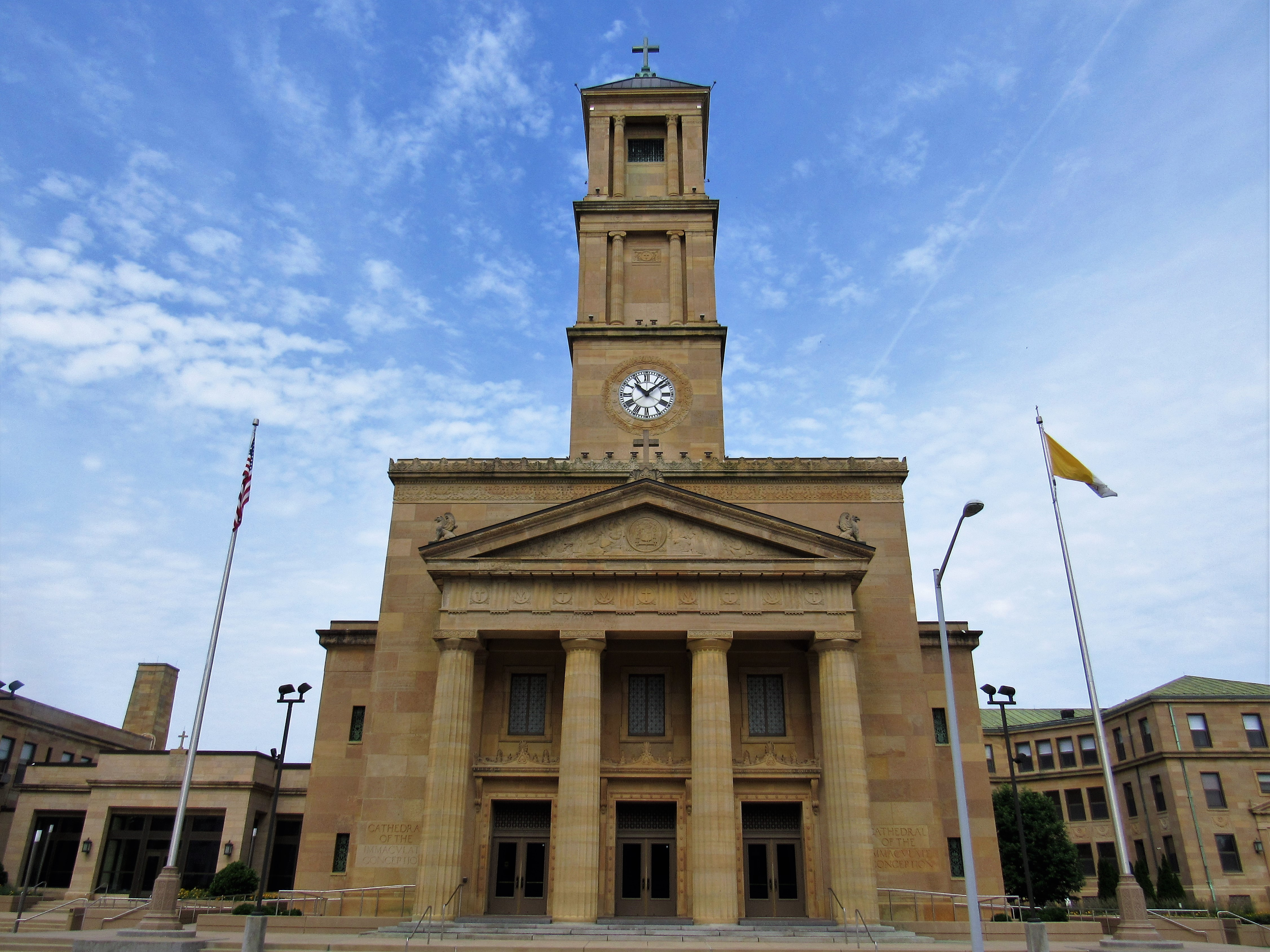

- Location in Illinois
- 39°47′36″N 89°38′55″W
- Location: 524 E. Lawrence Avenue; Springfield, Illinois
- Country: United States
- Denomination: Catholic Church
- Sui iuris church: Latin Church
- Website: spicathedral.org

History
- Status: Cathedral
- Founded: 1857
- Dedication: October 14, 1928

Architecture
- Architect: Joseph William McCarthy
- Style: Greek Revival
- Groundbreaking: 1927
- Completed: 1928

Specifications
- Materials: Mankato Kasota stone

Administration
- Diocese: Springfield in Illinois

Clergy
- Bishop: Most Rev. Thomas J. Paprocki
- Rector: Rev. Brian Alford

The Cathedral of the Immaculate Conception is the seat of the Catholic Diocese of Springfield in Illinois. The cathedral, for which the cornerstone was laid on August 14, 1927, was dedicated on October 14, 1928. The cathedral complex is built in a modified Greek Revival architectural style.

== Description ==
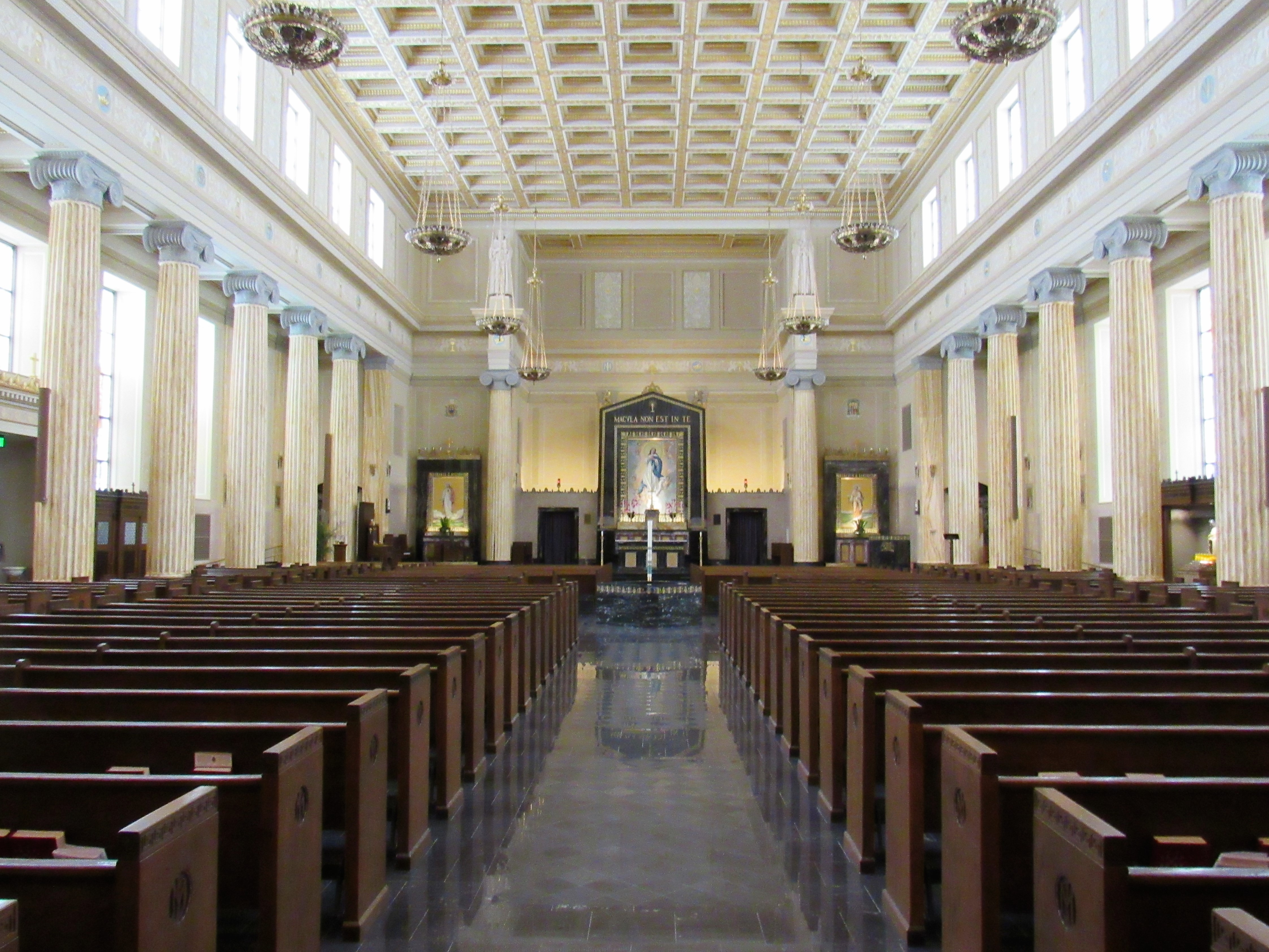
Cathedral interior

The cathedral was built and consecrated under the leadership of James Aloysius Griffin, fourth bishop of the diocese. Griffin was the first bishop to be based in Springfield, as the diocese had previously been seated in Quincy, Illinois, then Alton, Illinois).

The cathedral complex is faced with Kasota limestone, also called "Mankato Kasota stone," a golden limestone quarried in Mankato, Minnesota. Like many cathedral complexes, it also contains working space for the bishop and staff. An elementary school building forms the southern component of the complex. The cathedral itself is consecrated to the doctrine of the Immaculate Conception of the Virgin Mary, and is under the patronage of the Blessed Mother.

The cathedral is the second building in Springfield to be consecrated to the Immaculate Conception, the first being a Catholic church in use from 1858 until 1928. When the seat of the diocese moved to Springfield in 1923, it needed a larger structure to serve as cathedral. After completion of the cathedral, the nearby Lincoln-era church was de-consecrated and demolished.

== See also ==
- List of Catholic cathedrals in the United States
- List of cathedrals in the United States
