= United States Conference of Catholic Bishops =

American Catholic episcopal conference

- Abbreviation: USCCB
- Formation: July 2001; 25 years ago
- Type: Non-governmental organization
- Legal status: Civil nonprofit
- Headquarters: Washington, D.C.
- Region served: United States
- Members: Active and retired Catholic bishops of the United States
- President: Archbishop Paul Coakley
- Vice President: Bishop Daniel E. Flores
- Main organ: Conference
- Affiliations: National Council of Catholic Women; National Catholic Office for Persons with Disabilities; Catholic Legal Immigration Network; Catholic Relief Services; National Right to Life Committee (1968‍–‍1973); Christian Churches Together
- Staff: 300
- Website: www.usccb.org

The United States Conference of Catholic Bishops (USCCB) is the episcopal conference of the Catholic Church in the United States. Founded in 2001 after the merger of the National Conference of Catholic Bishops (NCCB) and United States Catholic Conference (USCC), the USCCB is a registered corporation based in Washington, D.C.

As with all bishops' conferences, certain decisions and acts of the USCCB must receive the recognitio, or approval, of the Roman dicasteries, which are subject to the immediate and absolute authority of the Pope.

As of November 2025, the USCCB president is Archbishop Paul Coakley of the Archdiocese of Oklahoma City. The vice president is Bishop Daniel E. Flores of the Diocese of Brownsville.

== Structure ==
The USCCB is composed of all active and retired members of the Catholic hierarchy in the United States and the territory of the U.S. Virgin Islands. This includes archbishops, bishops, coadjutors, auxiliary bishops and the ordinary of the Personal Ordinariate of the Chair of Saint Peter. The other American territories and commonwealths are not part of the USCCB.

The president is the chief executive officer of the USCCB and is in charge of the Administrative Committee. He also presides at the plenary sessions of the bishops. The vice president is the second highest official and is assigned certain duties by the president. The treasurer manages the USCCB finances and the secretary keeps the minutes of the plenary sessions. These officials are all bishops serving three-year terms in office.

The USCCB normally holds two general assemblies per years. The assemblies are open to all bishops along with organizations and individuals who work with the USCCB. Voting on proposals are limited to active bishops of the Latin and Eastern Rite churches; emeritus bishops (retired bishops) do not have a vote. Proposals are passed either on majority votes or two-thirds votes.

As of 2025, the USCCB has 19 standing committees. Seven of these committees have subcommittees.

== History ==
During the 19th century, the bishops in the United States met periodically to discuss issues facing the American church and to set policies and rules for its operation, with approval from the Vatican. Three of these plenary councils were held in Baltimore, Maryland, in 1852, 1866 and 1884.

As the American church grew and new circumstances arose, the need for more regular meetings soon became apparent.

=== National Catholic War Council ===
With the American entry into World War I in April 1917, the American Catholic hierarchy realized that it needed to provide chaplains and other services to Catholic soldiers serving in the United States and France. It would also need to raise funds from dioceses around the country to support these services.

In August 1917, each bishop in the United States sent one priest and one lay person to meet at the Catholic University of America in Washington, D.C. The organizers also invited members of the Catholic press and religious institutes. The 1917 meeting at Catholic University ended with the founding of the first national organization of Catholic bishops in the United States, the National Catholic War Council (NCWC). In December 1917, the American bishops decided to place the NCWC directly under their control.

=== National Catholic Welfare Council ===
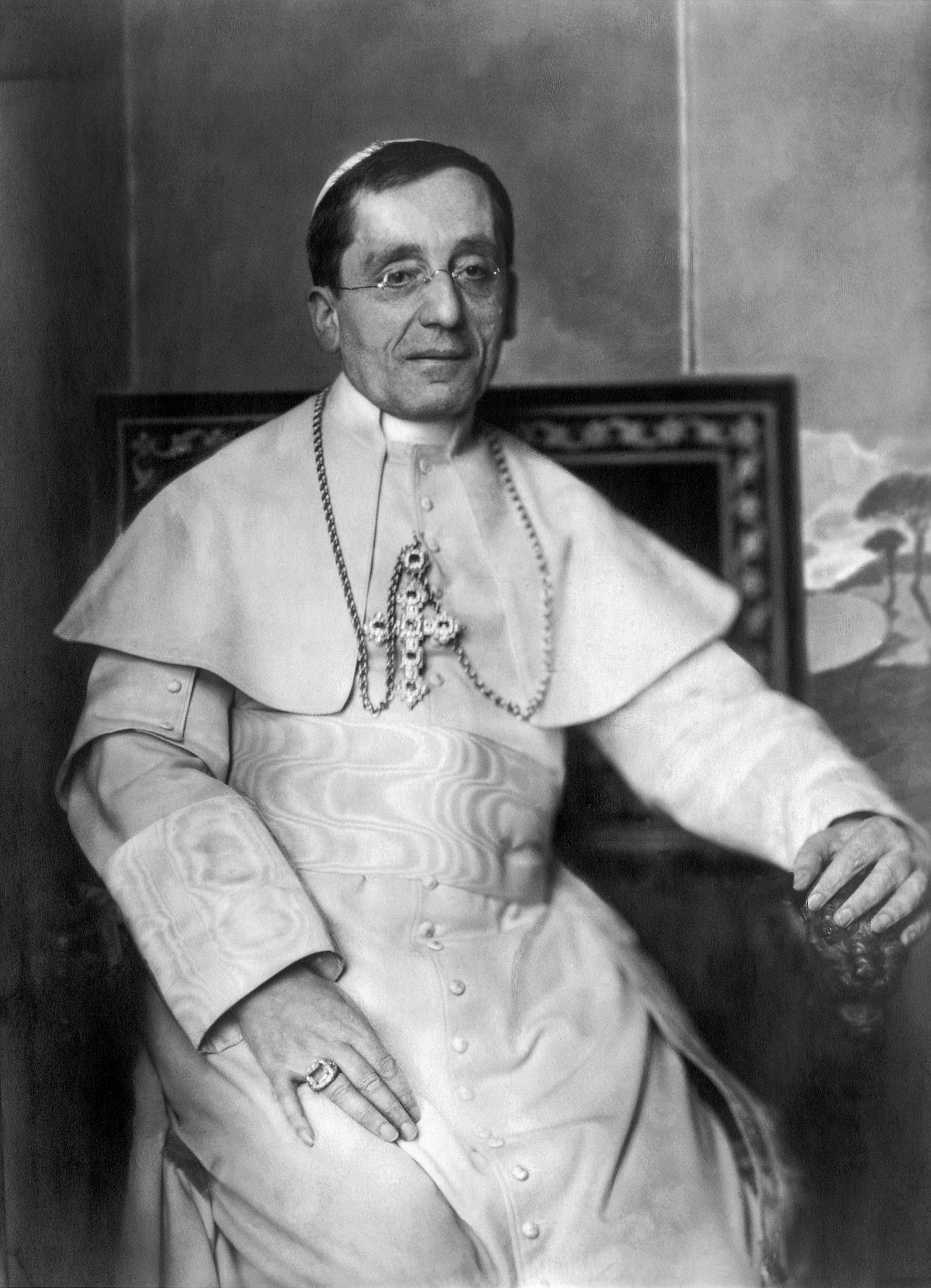
Pope Benedict XV (1915)

With the end of World War I, the general feeling among the American Catholic hierarchy was that they should create a new association of bishops to build on the successes of the NCWC. The American bishops met in February 1919 at Catholic University to discuss this new organization along with other matters. By the end of the meeting, they had decided to hold a yearly conference of what was now called the National Catholic Welfare Council (also known as NCWC)

The bishops also created an administrative committee with seven members to manage the daily business of the NCWC between plenary meetings. Archbishop Edward Hanna of San Francisco was named as the first committee chair and the NCWC headquarters was established in Washington, D.C. The first meeting of bishops was set for September 1919. In 1919, Pope Benedict XV urged the bishops to assist him in promoting the labor reforms first articulated by Pope Leo XIII in Rerum novarum.

=== National Catholic Welfare Conference ===
However, the NCWC soon faced opposition. In February 1920, Archbishop William O'Connell, leader of one of the largest archdiocese in the nation, petitioned the Consistorial Congregation in Rome to ban the NCWC. He claimed that it reflected Gallicanism and diminished the authority of the bishops. Several NCWC members protested the suppression to Pope Benedict XV, saying that the dissolution of the NCWC would make the bishops look autocratic. The pope agree to lift the suppression, but asked the bishops to change the organization's name in 1922 to the National Catholic Welfare Conference.

=== National Conference of Catholic Bishops and United States Catholic Conference ===
In 1966, the American bishops decided to split the NCWC into two organizations with different focuses, but common goals.

- The National Conference of Catholic Bishops (NCCB) was created to work on church affairs within the United States.
- The United States Catholic Conference (USCC) would concentrate on the Catholic church and American society.

=== United States Conference of Catholic Bishops ===
The bishops in 2001 decided to recombine the NCCB and the USCC into one organization, the United States Conference of Catholic Bishops (USCCB).

=== Sexual abuse crisis ===
Starting in the 1980s and continuing into the 21st century, the American Catholic church was hit with a huge wave of revelations of sexual abuse of children by priests and bishops, along with revelations of coverups and mismanagement of the scandals by American bishops. The fact that bishops commonly reassigned clergy accused of abuse from their parish to another parish where they still had access to children was considered to have allowed the abuse to proliferate. The initial USCCB response to the crisis was widely criticized, both within and outside the Catholic church.

In June 2002, the USCCB unanimously passed the Charter for the Protection of Children and Young People, known as the Dallas Charter. The charter committed the American Catholic Church to providing a "safe environment" for all children and youth participating in church-sponsored activities. To accomplish this, the American bishops pledged to establish uniform procedures for handling sex-abuse allegations against priests, lay teachers in Catholic schools, parish staff members, coaches and other people who dealt with children. It also adopted a "zero tolerance" policy towards these people for sexual abuse. In 2004, the USCCB commissioned the John Jay College of Criminal Justice at the City University of New York to conduct an independent investigation to determine the scope of sexual abuse allegations from 1950 to 2002. The college produced the John Jay Report.

Subsequent decades have seen the USCCB grappling with the fallout, which included dozens of court cases resulting in financial settlements with the victims of almost $4 billion. Numerous dioceses declared bankruptcy in an effort to manage the financial impact. The USCCB continues to publish an annual report on its progress in addressing concerns.

Archbishop Gómez in November 2020 issued an apology on behalf of the USCCB to the sexual abuse victims of former Cardinal Theodore McCarrick and to all victims of sexual abuse by clergy.

== Regions ==
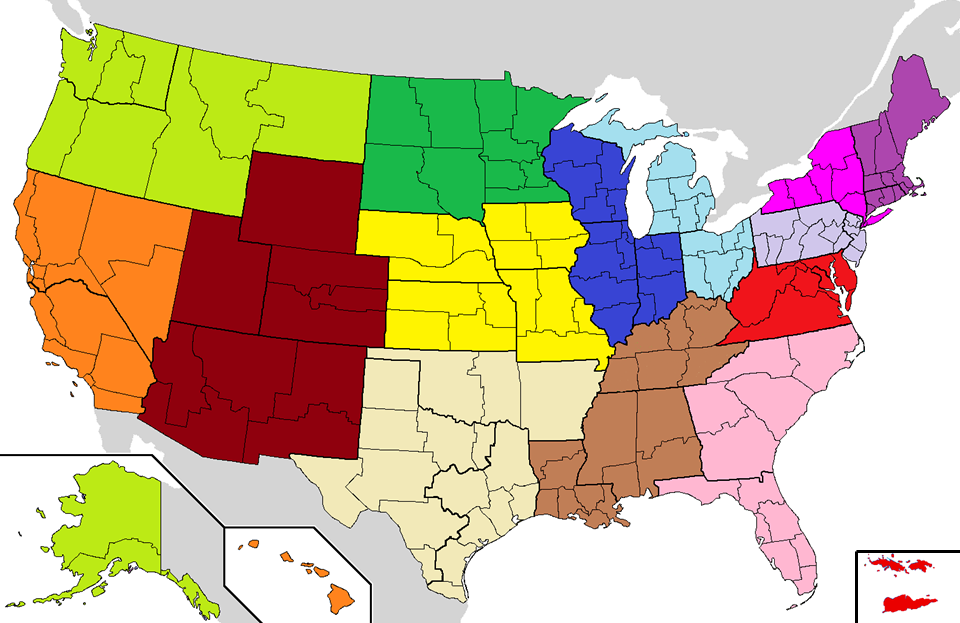
The dioceses and eparchies in the United States are grouped into 15 regions, each represented in a different color.

The American dioceses are grouped into 15 regions.

- Regions I through XIV contain the Latin Catholic dioceses
- The non-territorial Personal Ordinariate of the Chair of St. Peter is part of Region X.
- The Eastern Catholic eparchies (dioceses) constitute Region XV.

== Committees ==
=== National Right to Life ===
During the 1960s, the women's movement in the United States started working on the state level to legalize abortion rights for women. To combat these efforts, the NCCB in April 1967 appointed Reverend James T. McHugh during April 1967 to help coordinate a national Catholic counter-response.

In 1968, the NCCB founded the National Right to Life Committee (NRLC), headed by attorney Juan Ryan. Its goal was to coordinate information and strategy between Catholic anti-abortion groups. As of 2024, the NRLC has affiliates in all 50 states with over 3,000 local chapters. These NRLC affiliate groups were forming in response to efforts to change abortion laws based on model legislation proposed by the American Law Institute (ALI) in Philadelphia.

The NRLC held its first national meeting of chapter leaders in Chicago in 1970 at Barat College. The following year, NRLC held its first convention at Macalester College in St. Paul, Minnesota.

=== Laity, Marriage, Family Life, and Youth ===
The Committee on Laity, Marriage, Family Life, and Youth (LMFLY) develops programs and guidelinesto support lay Catholics, marriages, families, and young people in the United States. It supports marriage through resources on dating, marriage preparation, and family planning (NFP). It supports and advocates for traditional doctrine, including parental rights, family-friendly public policy.

== Issues ==
=== Abortion ===
In 1990, the USCCB hired the public relations firm Hill & Knowlton in New York City to launch a campaign to persuade Catholics and non-Catholics to oppose the Abortion-rights movement. This was part of a persuasive effect to educate the public on abortion as opposed to demonstrations at women's health clinics.

In the November 2023 assembly, the bishops again stated that abortion was a greater threat to life than gun violence, racism, climate change and inequality in health care and was the preeminent priority of the American Catholic Church.

=== Contraception ===
In March 2012, regarding the contraception mandate issued as a regulation under the 2010 Affordable Care Act, which required that employers who do not support contraception but are not religious institutions per se must cover contraception via their employer-sponsored health insurance. USCCB decided to "continue its 'vigorous opposition to this unjust and illegal mandate'".

=== Ecumenicism ===
As of 2021, the USCCB has been in ecumenical discussion with the Pentecostal/Charismatic Churches of North America (PCCNA), as well as discussing the possibility of future theological dialogue between Pentecostalism and Catholicism.

The USCCB is a member of Christian Churches Together, an interdenominational fellowship of Christian denominations and organizations in the United States.

=== Religious liberty ===
The USCCB in 2009 issued the revised Ethical and Religious Directives for Catholic Health Care Services. These directives were first issued in 1971. The main focus of these revisions was guidance for Catholic health care institutions in dealing with governments and non-Catholic organizations. It was sued by the American Civil Liberties Union (ACLU) on the grounds that the directive in some cases caused doctors to refuse treatment of women in an emergency medical situation.

From 2012 to 2018, the USCCB promoted Fortnight for Freedom, a campaign to protest government activities that the USCCB viewed as impinging on religious liberty. The USCCB replaced it in 2018 with Religious Liberty Week.

=== Gun violence ===
The USCCB filed an amicus brief in the 2024 US Supreme Court case of United States v. Rahimi. The USCCB argued that protecting the innocent "is a proper consideration" when regulating firearms: "As the Church teaches, and this Nation's historical traditions demonstrate, the right to bear arms is not an unqualified license that must leave vulnerable family members to live in fear. Abused victims are precisely the people whom a just government is tasked with protecting. The Second Amendment does not stand as a barrier to their safety."

=== Immigration ===
In January 2017, Bishop Joe S. Vásquez, the chairman of the USCCB Committee on Migration, criticized Executive Order 13769, issued by the Trump Administration. The order restricted refugees from several predominantly Muslim nations from entering the United States; it also banned all refugees from the Syrian Civil War from entering the country.

The USCCB in September 2017 condemned the Trump administration's cancellation of the Deferred Action for Childhood Arrivals (DACA) program. DACA had allowed nearly 800,000 young people who arrived in the United States as children of undocumented immigrants to apply for protection from deportation.

At the 2018 USCCB meeting in Fort Lauderdale, Florida, President Cardinal Daniel DiNardo criticized the Trump administration's policies of family separation of undocumented immigrants and the denial of asylum in the United States to women fleeing domestic violence in their home country.

In November 2025, the USCCB issued their first "special pastoral message" in twelve years, expressing solidarity with immigrants and opposition to what they called the "indiscriminate mass deportation" policies of the second Trump administration. In the statement, the Bishops say:

We are disturbed when we see among our people a climate of fear and anxiety around questions of profiling and immigration enforcement. We are saddened by the state of contemporary debate and the vilification of immigrants. We are concerned about the conditions in detention centers and the lack of access to pastoral care. We lament that some immigrants in the United States have arbitrarily lost their legal status.

The bishops voted overwhelmingly in favor of passing the immigration statement, with 216 voting yes, 5 against and 3 abstaining.

=== LGBTQ ===
In June 2020, a USCCB committee praised the Trump Administration for changing a US Department of Health and Human Services ruling regarding sexual discrimination based on gender identity.The statement said that it;

"...will help restore the rights of health care providers—as well as insurers and employers—who decline to perform or cover abortions or 'gender transition' procedures due to ethical or professional objections."

In December 2023, the USCCB clarified Pope Francis' recent remarks on the blessing of same-sex couples and unmarried couples. They said that a priest could bless them, but not in the context of validating their union as a marriage.

=== Politics ===
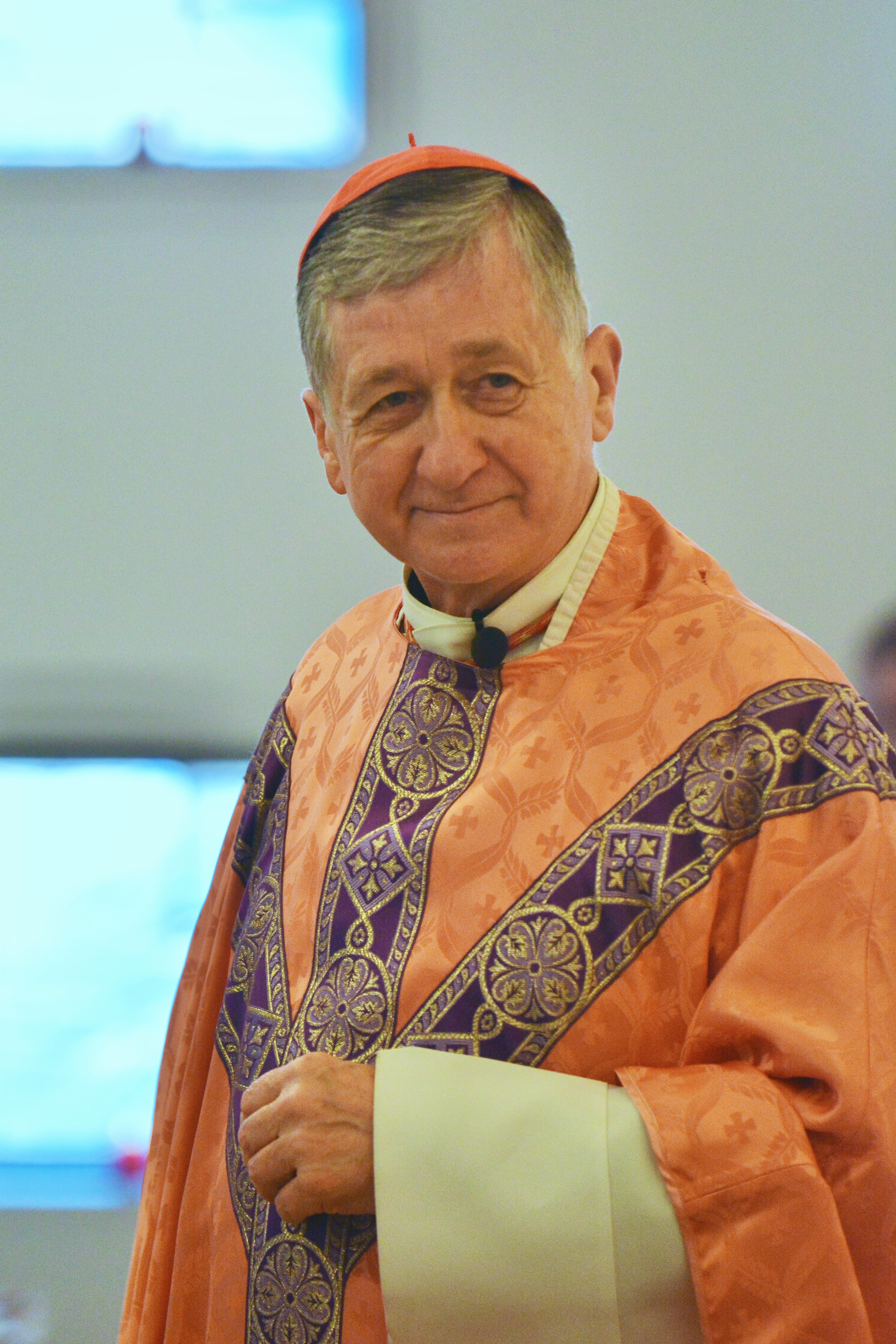
Cardinal Blaise Cupich (2021)

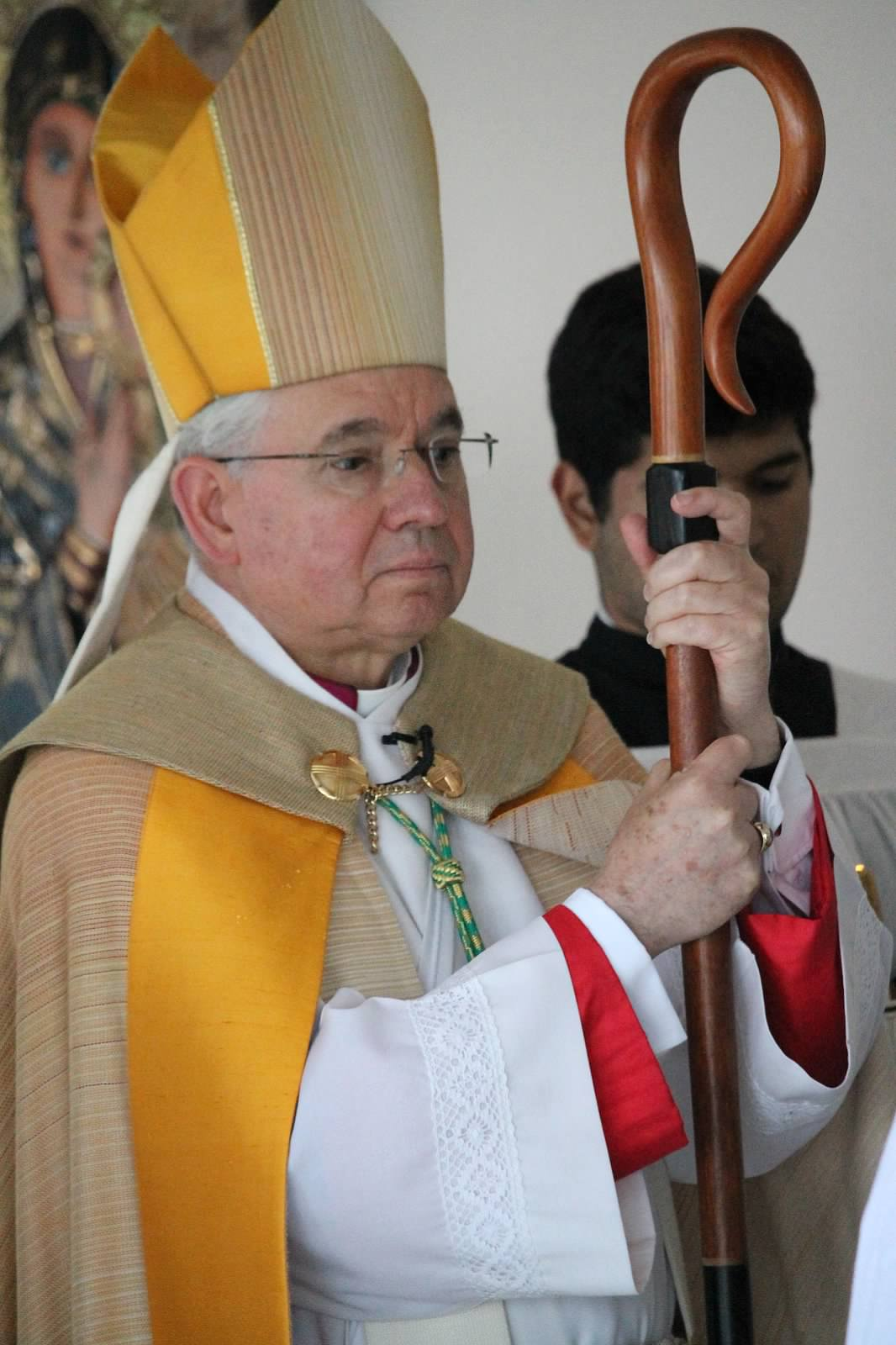
Archbishop José Gómez (2015)

In 2020, some conservative American bishops complained to Gómez after he congratulated US Senator Joe Biden, a Catholic, on his election as president of the United States. In response, Gómez formed a working group to address the "confusion" that could be caused by Catholic politicians who support policies that contravene Catholic teaching.

On January 20, 2021, inauguration day in the United States, Gómez sent Biden a congratulatory letter. The letter said that Gómez was "praying that God grant him wisdom and courage to lead this great nation and that God help him to meet the tests of these times. " However, Gómez also stated that some of Biden's policies,

"...would advance moral evils and threaten human life and dignity, most seriously in the areas of abortion, contraception, marriage, and gender. Of deep concern is the liberty of the Church and the freedom of believers to live according to their consciences."

Several bishops, including Cardinal Blase J. Cupich of Chicago, objected to the Gómez letter. Cupich said that individuals within the USCCB drafted the Biden letter without first consulting with the Administrative Committee. He described the incident as an "institutional failure" of the USCCB; the bishops should have been allowed to approve the Biden letter first. In what America magazine called a "rare rebuke", Cupich released two statements, one of which said,

"Today, the United States Conference of Catholic Bishops issued an ill-considered statement on the day of President Biden's inauguration. Aside from the fact that there is seemingly no precedent for doing so, the statement, critical of President Biden, came as a surprise to many bishops, who received it just hours before it was released."

On March 30, 2021, Gómez wrote to the Congregation for the Doctrine of the Faith (CDF) in Rome, telling them that the USCCB was drafting a new document on the worthiness of Catholic politicians to receive communion.

Cardinal Luis Ladaria, prefect of the CDF, replied to Gómez on May 7th. Ladaria cautioned the USCCB to preserve unity among its bishops in discussing anti-abortion issues. Ladaria also said that abortion and euthanasia were not the only grave issues of Catholic moral teaching. He further stated that any new USCCB provision had to respect the rights of individual bishops in their diocese and the prerogatives of the Vatican. In April 2021, the Gómez working group announced that it was drafting a new document on communion.

=== Racism ===
During the 2020 protests over the murder of George Floyd by police in Minneapolis, Minnesota, Archbishop José Horacio Gómez, the USCCB president, issued a statement condemning Floyd's death. He cited Reverend Martin Luther King Jr.'s words that "riots are the language of the unheard".

=== Israeli–Palestinian conflict ===
Following the official political stance of the Vatican, the USCCB endorses a two-state solution to the Israeli–Palestinian conflict, which it describes as "a secure and recognized Israel living in peace alongside a viable and independent Palestine."

On 11 December 2024, during the ongoing Gaza war, the USCCB and the American Jewish Committee (AJC) published a joint document that condemned antisemitism and anti-Zionism. It states that calling Zionism inherently racist is antisemitic; and that allegations about Zionism being settler-colonialism, or having as its goal the ethnic cleansing of Palestinians, are antisemitic and false.

Later on 25 March, Kairos Palestine, an organization led by Catholic Patriarch Emeritus Michel Sabbah and composed of Catholic, Orthodox, and Protestant Palestinians, sent a letter to the USCCB objecting to the document. Kairos Palestine particularly condemned the document's characterization of anti-Israel sentiment as antisemitic, stated that it ignored "overwhelming evidence" of the ethnic cleansing of Palestinians, and accused the USCCB of alienating Palestinian Christians. The Catholic organization Pax Christi USA issued a statement backing Kairos Palestine.

Archbishop Broglio's response to the letter on 31 March explained that the USCCB partnered with the AJC to combat rising antisemitism, but appeared to not directly respond to the specific objections of Kairos Palestine. On 14 April, Kairos Palestine sent another letter to the USCCB which called Broglio's response "unacceptable", accused the USCCB of sharing responsibility for the plight of Palestinians, and condemned the conflation of the Palestinian cause with antisemitism as "theologically and morally wrong".

== Funding ==
Most funding for the USCCB is raised through national collections, government grants, and diocesan assessments.

== List of presidents and vice-presidents ==
=== Presidents ===
This lists the USCCB presidents, their dioceses or archdioceses and their dates of service:

1. Cardinal John Dearden, Archdiocese of Detroit (1966–1971)
2. Cardinal John Krol, Archdiocese of Philadelphia (1971–1974)
3. Archbishop Joseph Bernardin, later cardinal, Archdiocese of Cincinnati (1974–1977)
4. Archbishop John R. Quinn, Archdiocese of San Francisco (1977–1980)
5. Archbishop John Roach, Archdiocese of Saint Paul and Minneapolis (1980–1983)
6. Bishop James William Malone, Diocese of Youngstown (1983–1986)
7. Archbishop John L. May, Archdiocese of St. Louis (1986–1989)
8. Archbishop Daniel Edward Pilarczyk, Archdiocese of Cincinnati (1989–1992)
9. Cardinal William H. Keeler, Archdiocese of Baltimore (1992–1995)
10. Bishop Anthony Pilla, Diocese of Cleveland (1995–1998)
11. Bishop Joseph Fiorenza, later archbishop, Diocese of Galveston–Houston (1998 – November 13, 2001)
12. Bishop Wilton Daniel Gregory, later cardinal, Diocese of Belleville (November 13, 2001 – November 15, 2004)
13. Bishop William S. Skylstad, Diocese of Spokane (November 15, 2004 – November 13, 2007)
14. Cardinal Francis George OMI, Archdiocese of Chicago (November 13, 2007 – November 16, 2010)
15. Cardinal Timothy M. Dolan, Archdiocese of New York (November 16, 2010 – November 14, 2013)
16. Archbishop Joseph Edward Kurtz, Archdiocese of Louisville (November 14, 2013 – November 15, 2016)
17. Cardinal Daniel DiNardo, Archdiocese of Galveston–Houston (November 15, 2016 – November 12, 2019)
18. Archbishop José Horacio Gómez, Archdiocese of Los Angeles (November 12, 2019 – November 15, 2022)
19. Archbishop Timothy Broglio, Archdiocese for the Military Services, USA (November 15, 2022 – November 11, 2025)
20. Archbishop Paul Coakley, Archdiocese of Oklahoma City (November 11, 2025 – present)

=== Vice-Presidents ===
This lists the USCCB vice-presidents, their dioceses or archdioceses and their dates of service:

1. Cardinal John Krol, Archdiocese of Philadelphia (1966–1971)
2. Coadjutor Archbishop Leo Christopher Byrne, Archdiocese of Saint Paul and Minneapolis (1971–1974)
3. Cardinal John Carberry, Archdiocese of St. Louis (1974–1977)
4. Archbishop John Roach, Archdiocese of Saint Paul and Minneapolis (1977–1980)
5. Bishop James William Malone, Diocese of Youngstown (1980–1983)
6. Archbishop John L. May, Archdiocese of St. Louis (1983–1986)
7. Archbishop Daniel Edward Pilarczyk, Archdiocese of Cincinnati (1986–1989)
8. Archbishop William H. Keeler, later cardinal, Archdiocese of Baltimore (1989–1992)
9. Bishop Anthony Pilla, Diocese of Cleveland (1992–1995)
10. Bishop Joseph Fiorenza, later archbishop, Diocese of Galveston–Houston (1995–1998)
11. Bishop Wilton Daniel Gregory, later cardinal, Diocese of Belleville (1998 – November 13, 2001)
12. Bishop William S. Skylstad, Diocese of Spokane (November 13, 2001 – November 15, 2004)
13. Cardinal Francis George OMI, Archdiocese of Chicago (November 15, 2004 – November 13, 2007)
14. Bishop Gerald Frederick Kicanas, Diocese of Tucson (November 13, 2007 – November 16, 2010)
15. Archbishop Joseph Edward Kurtz, Archdiocese of Louisville (November 16, 2010 – November 14, 2013)
16. Cardinal Daniel DiNardo, Archdiocese of Galveston–Houston (November 14, 2013 – November 15, 2016)
17. Archbishop José Horacio Gómez, Archdiocese of Los Angeles (November 15, 2016 – November 12, 2019)
18. Archbishop Allen Vigneron, Archdiocese of Detroit (November 12, 2019 – November 15, 2022)
19. Archbishop William E. Lori, Archdiocese of Baltimore (November 15, 2022 – November 11, 2025)
20. Bishop Daniel Flores, Diocese of Brownsville (November 11, 2025 – present)

== See also ==
- Catholic Church and politics in the United States
- Catholic News Service
- Collegiality in the Catholic Church
- Historical list of the Catholic bishops of the United States
- History of the Catholic Church in the United States
- List of Catholic bishops of the United States
- List of Catholic dioceses in the United States
- National Federation of Priests' Councils
- Plenary Councils of Baltimore
- Pontifical North American College
- The American College of the Immaculate Conception
- USCCB Publishing
