= James Patrick Keleher =

American prelate (1931–2024)

His Excellency, The Most Reverend James Patrick Keleher
- Archbishop of Kansas City
- Appointed: June 28, 1993
- Installed: September 8, 1993
- Retired: January 15, 2005
- Predecessor: Ignatius Jerome Strecker
- Successor: Joseph Fred Naumann
- Previous post: Bishop of Belleville (1984–1993)

Orders
- Ordination: April 12, 1958 by Samuel Stritch
- Consecration: December 11, 1984 by Joseph Bernardin, William Michael Cosgrove, and Thomas Joseph Murphy

Personal details
- Born: July 31, 1931 Chicago, Illinois, U.S.
- Died: November 9, 2024 (aged 93) Olathe, Kansas, U.S.
- Motto: One body - one spirit

Styles of James Patrick Keleher
- Reference style: His Excellency; The Most Reverend
- Spoken style: Your Excellency
- Religious style: Archbishop

James Patrick Keleher (July 31, 1931 – November 9, 2024) was an American prelate of the Roman Catholic Church. He served as bishop of the Diocese of Belleville in Illinois from 1984 to 1993 and as archbishop of the Archdiocese of Kansas City in Kansas from 1993 to 2005.

== Biography ==
=== Early life and education ===
James Keleher was born on July 31, 1931, on the South Side of Chicago, Illinois, to James and Rita (née Cullinane) Keleher. Rita was born in County Kerry, Ireland. She came to Chicago in the 1920s, later retiring as a registered nurse to raise her children. James Keleher senior was a salesman in Chicago for Will & Baumer Candle Company, a manufacturer of church candles .

The younger James Keleher belonged to St. Felicitas Parish in Chicago. As a child, he considered careers either as a firefighter or a priest. After attending Mount Carmel High School in Chicago for one year, he entered Archbishop Quigley Preparatory Seminary in Chicago, graduating in 1951. He then studied philosophy and theology at St. Mary of the Lake Seminary in Mundelein, Illinois.

=== Priesthood ===
Keleher was ordained to the priesthood for the Archdiocese of Chicago by Cardinal Samuel Stritch on April 12, 1958. After his ordination, Keleher continued his studies at St. Mary of the Lake, obtaining a Doctor of Sacred Theology degree in 1962 with a dissertation on the writings of Augustine of Hippo. He also served during this time as chaplain and confessor to the Benedictine Sisters of Perpetual Adoration at their monastery in Clyde, Missouri.

In 1962, Keleher was named an associate pastor at St. Henry's Parish in the Rogers Park section of Chicago. In 1966, he also became academic dean and teacher of religion and social studies at the north campus of Archbishop Quigley.

In 1969, Keleher was appointed dean of formation at Niles College Seminary in Chicago, then in 1972 took the same position at St. Mary of the Lake. His next position was as rector of the south campus of Archbishop Quigley, serving there until 1978. During this period, he also furthered his studies in spiritual theology at Rome. In 1978, Keleher was named president and rector of St. Mary of the Lake, where he also taught systematic theology.

=== Bishop of Belleville ===
On October 23, 1984, Pope John Paul II appointed Keleher as the sixth bishop of Belleville. He was consecrated at St. Peter's Cathedral in Belleville, Illinois, on December 11, 1984, by Cardinal Joseph Bernardin, with Bishops William Cosgrove and Thomas Murphy serving as co-consecrators.

=== Archbishop of Kansas City ===
Following the retirement of Archbishop Ignatius Strecker, Keleher was named the third archbishop of Kansas City on June 28, 1993, by John Paul II. He was installed at the Cathedral of St. Peter the Apostle in Kansas City, Kansas, on September 8, 1993.

In 1996, Keleher started an education program to fight child sexual abuse in the archdiocese and instituted a background questionnaire for anyone working with children. Keleher established an independent review board in 2002 to investigate and issue recommendations on all allegations of sexual abuse. In 2003, he instituted VIRTUS, a national child abuse prevention program.

On January 7, 2004, John Paul II appointed Bishop Joseph Naumann to serve as coadjutor archbishop for the archdiocese. On February 21, 2004, Keleher requested that parishes and other Catholic institutions within the archdiocese stop inviting politicians who support abortion rights for women to any events. This request was precipitated by the University of St. Mary in Leavenworth, Kansas, inviting then Governor Kathleen Sebelius, a Catholic who supports abortion rights, to speak at an event.

=== Retirement and legacy ===
On January 15, 2005, Keleher submitted his letter of resignation as archbishop of Kansas City to Pope Benedict XVI, having reached the mandatory retirement age of 75 for bishops. Later that year, Keleher started teaching part time at St. Mary of the Lakes Seminary. Keleher also visited state prisons in Kansas on a regular basis, including the celebration of a Chrism Mass in April 2011 at the Topeka Correctional Facility in Topeka, Kansas. After retirement, he was involved in Prison Ministry.

Keleher died in Olathe, Kansas, on November 9, 2024, at the age of 93.

== See also ==
- Catholic Church hierarchy
- Catholic Church in the United States
- Historical list of the Catholic bishops of the United States
- List of Catholic bishops of the United States
- Lists of patriarchs, archbishops, and bishops

== Episcopal succession ==
Catholic Church titles
Preceded by Ignatius Jerome Strecker	Archbishop of Kansas City; 1993–2005	Succeeded by Joseph Fred Naumann
Preceded by John Nicholas Wurm	Bishop of Belleville; 1984–1993	Succeeded by Wilton Daniel Gregory
