= Albert Rudolph Zuroweste =

American prelate

His Excellency, The Most Reverend Albert Rudolph Zuroweste
- Bishop of Belleville
- See: Diocese of Belleville
- Predecessor: Henry J. Althoff
- Successor: William Michael Cosgrove

Orders
- Ordination: June 8, 1924 by Henry J. Althoff
- Consecration: January 29, 1948 by Joseph Schlarman

Personal details
- Born: April 26, 1901 East St. Louis, Illinois, US
- Died: March 28, 1987 (aged 85) Belleville, Illinois, US
- Education: Quincy College; Kenrick Seminary; Catholic University of America

Albert Rudolph Zuroweste (April 26, 1901 – March 28, 1987) was an American Catholic prelate who served as bishop of Belleville in Illinois from 1948 to 1976.

== Biography ==
=== Early life ===
Albert Zuroweste was born on April 26, 1901, in East St. Louis, Illinois, to Henry and Elizabeth (née Holten) Zuroweste. His uncle was Frank Holten, a member of the Illinois House of Representatives. In 1914, Zuroweste entered Quincy College in Quincy Illinois. After graduating in 1918, he entered the Kenrick Seminary in St. Louis, Missouri, studying there until 1924.

=== Priesthood ===
Zuroweste was ordained to the priesthood in Belleville, Illinois, for the Diocese of Belleville by Bishop Henry J Althoff on June 8, 1924. Upon his return to Illinois, he served as a curate at St. Joseph Parish in East St. Louis, Illinois. In 1931, he left St. Joseph to became superintendent of St. John Orphanage in Belleville. He studied at the Catholic University of America in Washington, D.C., during the summer of 1934. Starting in 1934, Zuroweste served as editor of the diocesan newspaper, The Messenger, and as superintendent of Central Catholic High School in Belleville from 1934 to 1947. He was named pastor of St. Joseph Parish in 1940. The Vatican elevated Zuroweste to the rank of domestic prelate in 1945.

=== Bishop of Belleville ===
On November 29, 1947, Zuroweste was appointed the third bishop of Belleville by Pope Pius XII. He received his episcopal consecration at St. Peter's Cathedral in Belleville on January 29, 1948, from Bishop Joseph Schlarman, with Bishops John Cody and Joseph Mueller serving as co-consecrators. In addition to his duties as bishop, Zuroweste became president of the National Catholic Rural Life Conference in 1951 and chair of the Press Department of the National Catholic Welfare Council in 1957. He attended all four sessions of the Second Vatican Council between 1962 and 1965.

In 1969, Zuroweste became embroiled in a racial dispute in Cairo, Illinois. He had sent Reverend Gerald Montroy to Cairo in 1968 to minister to the poor and to African-Americans. After meeting with the local pastor at St. Patrick Catholic Parish, Montroy became convinced that he had no desire to welcome African-Americans to his parish. In response, Montroy reopened St. Columba, a shuttered mission in Cairo founded by the Society of African Missions, and started celebrating masses there for African-American Catholics. He also provided facilities for Black Power activists looking to challenge racial discrimination in that city, including the activist Charles Koen and his United Front organization. Zuroweste came under pressure from White residents of Cairo to recall Montroy, but gave him qualified support after demands from progressive Catholic organizations. After several shooting incidents, Montroy accused a local white group of vigilantism and St. Patrick's pastor of trying to oust him.

In December 1971, Zuroweste excommunicated Reverend Bernard Bodewes, a diocesan priest he had sent to Cairo to help Montroy. Bodewes had sued Zuroweste for $7,350 in damages for withholding his pay since January 1st of that year. Bodewes said that Zuroweste had withheld the pay because he was angry over Bodewes' support of Montroy's initiatives in Cairo. By 1972, Zuroweste took action to evict Montroy and the organizations working in St. Columba.

=== Later life ===
On August 30, 1976, Pope Paul VI accepted Zuroweste's resignation as bishop of Belleville. Albert Zuroweste died on March 28, 1987, in Belleville at age 85.

== Sexual abuse case ==
During a 2008 lawsuit against the Diocese of Belleville, information was revealed about Zuroweste's treatment of a child abuser priest. In 1973 Gina Parks, a 16-year-old parishioner in St. Francisville, Illinois, told diocesan officials that her parish priest, Reverend Raymond Kownacki, had raped and impregnated her. Kownacki also encouraged Parks to have an abortion.

After hearing Parks' story, Zuroweste did not report the allegations to the police or initiate an investigation. Instead, he transferred Kownacki several months later to St. Theresa Parish in Salem, Illinois, without any restrictions. By 1982, allegations surfaced that Kownacki was sexually abusing young boys at St. Theresa, resulting in the 2008 lawsuit.

Catholic Church titles
| Preceded by Henry J. Althoff | Bishop of Belleville; 1948—1976 | Succeeded by William Michael Cosgrove |
