= Glen Provost =

American Catholic prelate (born 1949)

His Excellency, The Most Reverend Glen John Provost
- Bishop of Lake Charles
- Church: Catholic
- Diocese: Lake Charles
- Appointed: March 6, 2007
- Installed: April 23, 2007
- Predecessor: Edward Kenneth Braxton

Orders
- Ordination: June 29, 1975 by Pope Paul VI
- Consecration: April 23, 2007 by Alfred Clifton Hughes, Jude Speyrer, and Charles Michael Jarrell

Personal details
- Born: August 9, 1949 (age 77) Lafayette, Louisiana, US
- Education: Saint Joseph Seminary College; Istituto Santa Maria Institut Catholique; Pontifical University of St. Thomas Aquinas; University of Louisiana-Lafayette University of London
- Motto: Pro venturis serit (Latin for 'Sow for those to come')

Styles of Glen John Provost
- Reference style: His Excellency; The Most Reverend
- Spoken style: Your Excellency
- Religious style: Bishop

Glen John Provost (born August 9, 1949) is an American prelate of the Catholic Church who has served as bishop of the Diocese of Lake Charles in Louisiana since 2007.

== Biography ==
=== Early life ===
Glen Provost was born on August 9, 1949, to Cyrus and Sadie Marie Blanchet Provost in Lafayette, Louisiana. Deciding as a young man to become a priest, Provost entered Saint Joseph Seminary College in Covington, Louisiana. He received a Bachelor of Arts in English Literature from Saint Joseph in 1971.

After his graduation, Provost traveled to Rome to enter the seminary of the Pontifical North American College. Provost studied Italian in Rome at the Istituto Santa Maria. In 1972, he spent time in Paris studying French at the Institut Catholique. In 1974, Provost was awarded a Bachelor of Sacred Theology degree from the Pontifical University of St. Thomas Aquinas in Rome and a Licentiate in Sacred Theology in 1975.

=== Priesthood ===
Provost was ordained to the priesthood for the Diocese of Lafayette by Pope Paul VI on June 29, 1975 in St. Peter’s Basilica in Vatican City.After Provost's ordination, the diocese assigned him as associate pastor at St. Mary Magdalene Parish in Abbeville, Louisiana. He also entered the University of Louisiana-Lafayette (ULL) in Lafayette. He went to London in 1980 to study Victorian language at the University of London. Provost graduated from ULL in 1981 with a Master of Arts in English Literature.

After eight years at St. Mary, Provost was named pastor of St. Leo Parish in Roberts Cove, Louisiana. Provost was moved to the St. John Cathedral Parish in 1985, where he would remain as pastor for the next 13 years. In 1987, he was appointed as a judge on the diocesan tribunal and as a member of the Catholic School Board.In 1991, Bishop Harry Flynn appointed Provost as episcopal vicar and dean of the West Lafayette Deanery.

=== Bishop of Lake Charles ===
Provost was appointed bishop of Lake Charles by Pope Benedict XVI on March 6, 2007. He was consecrated on April 23, 2007 at the Cathedral of the Immaculate Conception in Lake Charles, with Archbishop Alfred C. Hughes as principal celebrant. His installation brought to a close the two-year 'sede vacante' the diocese experienced after his predecessor, Bishop Edward Braxton, was appointed bishop of Belleville on March 15, 2005.Provost speaks French, Italian, and Spanish.

== See also ==
- Catholic Church in the United States
- Hierarchy of the Catholic Church
- Historical list of the Catholic bishops of the United States
- List of Catholic bishops of the United States
- Lists of popes, patriarchs, primates, archbishops, and bishops

Catholic Church titles
| Preceded by Edward Kenneth Braxton | Bishop of Lake Charles; 2007–Present | Succeeded by Incumbent |
