= Immaculate Conception Cathedral School =

Immaculate Conception Cathedral School may refer to:

- Immaculate Conception Cathedral School (Philippines), Quezon City, Philippines
- Immaculate Conception Cathedral School, Roman Catholic Diocese of Lake Charles, Louisiana
- Immaculate Conception Cathedral School (Memphis, Tennessee), Memphis, Tennessee
