= Edward Braxton =

American Roman Catholic retired bishop

His Excellency, The Most Reverend Edward Kenneth Braxton
- Bishop Emeritus of Belleville
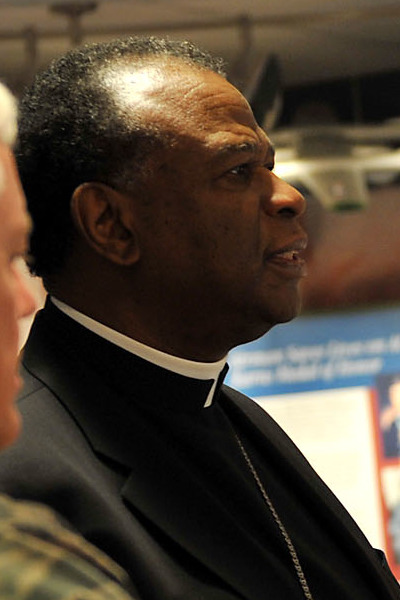
- Bishop Braxton in 2009
- Diocese: Diocese of Belleville
- Appointed: March 15, 2005
- Installed: June 22, 2005
- Retired: April 3, 2020
- Predecessor: Wilton Daniel Gregory
- Successor: Michael G. McGovern
- Previous posts: Bishop of Lake Charles (2001–2005); Auxiliary Bishop of Saint Louis and Titular Bishop of Macomades Rusticiana (1995–2000)

Orders
- Ordination: May 13, 1970 by John P. Cody
- Consecration: May 17, 1995 by Justin F. Rigali, J. Terry Steib, and Paul A. Zipfel

Personal details
- Born: Edward Kenneth Braxton; June 28, 1944 (age 82) Chicago, Illinois, US
- Education: St. Mary of the Lake Seminary (M.A., S.T.L.); Catholic University of Louvain (Ph.D., S.T.D.); University of Chicago Divinity School
- Motto: Mane nobiscum Domine (Stay with us, Lord)

Styles of Edward Kenneth Braxton
- Reference style: His Excellency; The Most Reverend
- Spoken style: Your Excellency
- Religious style: Bishop

Edward Kenneth Braxton (born June 28, 1944) is an American Catholic prelate who served Bishop of Belleville from 2005 to 2020. Braxton previously served as an auxiliary bishop of the Archdiocese of St. Louis from 1995 to 2000 and Bishop of Lake Charles from 2000 to 2005.

== Biography ==
=== Early life ===
Braxton was born on June 28, 1944, in Chicago, Illinois, to Cullen L. Braxton Sr and Evelyn Braxton. He attended Archbishop Quigley Preparatory Seminary and Niles College Seminary, both in Chicago, then St. Mary of the Lake Seminary in Mundelein, Illinois. He earned Bachelor, Masters, and Bachelor of Sacred Theology degrees, along with a Licentiate in Sacred Theology. Before his ordination, Braxton served as a deacon for one year at St. Raymond De Penafort Parish in Mount Prospect, Illinois.

=== Priesthood ===
On May 13, 1970, Braxton was ordained as a priest of the Archdiocese of Chicago by Cardinal John Cody.

In 1973, Braxton entered the Catholic University of Louvain in Leuven, Belgium, earning a Doctor of Religious Studies degree and a Doctor of Sacred Theology degree in systematic theology, summa cum laude. While in Belgium, he ministered at US Armed Forces bases in the area and at Our Lady of Mercy Parish in Brussels.

After returning to Chicago, Braxton served as associate pastor of St. Felicitas Parish. He also began a post-doctoral fellowship at University of Chicago Divinity School. In 1976, Braxton attended the Harvard University Divinity School, occupying the William A. Coolidge Chair of Ecumenical Thought for a year. During this time, he also performed pastoral duties at St. Paul's Parish in Cambridge, Massachusetts. The next year, Braxton became a visiting professor of theology at the University of Notre Dame.

In 1978, Braxton was named chancellor for theological affairs in the Diocese of Cleveland for then Bishop James A. Hickey. When Hickey became Archbishop of Washington in 1980, Braxton became his special assistant for theological affairs. He was one of the first priests to be appointed to this type of collaborative work with a bishop on a full-time basis.

While in Washington, Braxton also worked in ministry at St. John the Baptist Parish in Silver Spring, Maryland. In 1983, Braxton became the scholar in residence at the Pontifical North American College in Rome.

After returning to Chicago in 1983, Braxton was named director of Calvert House, the Catholic Student Center at the University of Chicago, working there until 1986. In 1984, he served as a peritus for the Symposium of Episcopal Conferences of Africa and Madagascar in Kinshasa, Zaire. In August 1985, Braxton addressed the 43rd International Eucharistic Congress in Nairobi, Kenya on "The Eucharist and the Catholic Family."

Braxton's writings have appeared in the Harvard Theological Review, Theological Studies, Irish Theological Quarterly, The New Catholic Encyclopedia, Origins, Commonweal, America, and National Catholic Reporter.

In 1986, Braxton became the official theological consultant in New York City to William H. Sadlier Inc., a publisher of Catholic Religious Education books. While at Sadler, he performed pastoral duties at St. Joseph's Parish in Greenwich Village and at Notre Dame Parish at Columbia University.

In 1992, Braxton returned to Illinois to become pastor of St. Catherine of Siena Parish in Oak Park. While at St. Catherine, Braxton stirred resentment among some parishioners by refusing to allow Sister Teresita Weind to deliver homilies at Mass. In August 1997, Braxton addressed the National Black Catholic Congress on the topic "Take Into account Various Situations and Cultures: Evangelization and African-Americans".

=== Auxiliary Bishop of St. Louis ===
Braxton was appointed an auxiliary bishop of the Archdiocese of Saint Louis and titular bishop of Macomades Rusticiana by Pope John Paul II on March 28, 1995. He was consecrated by Cardinal Justin Rigali on May 17, 1995, at the Cathedral Basilica of Saint Louis.

=== Bishop of Lake Charles ===
Braxton was appointed bishop of the Diocese of Lake Charles in Louisiana on December 12, 2000. He was installed on February 22, 2001.

=== Bishop of Belleville ===
In January 2005, Bishop Wilton Gregory of Belleville was appointed archbishop of the Archdiocese of Atlanta. As was the normal procedure, Cardinal Francis George, then archbishop of Chicago, asked the priests and laity in the Diocese of Belleville for their input on Gregory's replacement. However, before the Vatican received it, Pope John Paul II appointed Braxton as bishop on March 15, 2005. In May of that year, 50 priests from the diocese signed a letter to the Vatican complaining about how Braxton was selected. George later said that John Paul II did not consult him either on the Braxton selection.

Braxton was installed on June 22, 2005, as bishop of Belleville in the Cathedral of Saint Peter in Belleville, Illinois. He served as a member of USCCB's Committees on Education, Science and Human Values, and also of the committee on Scripture Translation.

In January 2006, 24 priests in the diocese signed a letter stating that Braxton was not allowing any of their input into decision-making and that he had an arrogant leadership style. On January 24, 2008, Braxton apologized for mishandling diocese funds. He had used $18,000 that was supposed to go to the Society for the Propagation of the Faith to purchase vestments, altar linens, and office furniture. Braxton said he had mistakenly believed he had discretionary power over these funds.

In February 2012, the Reverend William Rowe, pastor of Saint Mary's Church in Mount Carmel, Illinois, resigned from his post after Braxton expressed concern about "how Father Rowe celebrated the Mass". Following the implementation of the new English translation of the Roman Missal in late November 2011, Braxton had placed greater emphasis on following the translation exactly. However, Braxton's concerns predated that translation's use. He stated that "several meetings ... over the last five years [had] failed to resolve the bishop's concerns." "Several parishioners" had expressed dismay and furnished evidence about Rowe's celebration of the Mass. Rowe said "He mentioned in the letter that we clash in our ecclesiology — our image of the church. He’s right. He seems to consider the church as the bishops’, and my notion is that the church starts with the people." Another priest also resigned after Rowe.

== Retirement ==
On April 3, 2020, Pope Francis accepted Braxton's letter of resignation as bishop of Belleville. The pope named Reverend Michael G. McGovern from Chicago as Braxton's successor.

Catholic Church titles
Preceded by Wilton Daniel Gregory	Bishop of Belleville; 2005 – 2020	Succeeded by Michael G. McGovern
Preceded by Jude Speyrer	Bishop of Lake Charles; 2000–2005	Succeeded by Glen John Provost
Preceded by –	Auxiliary Bishop of St. Louis; 1995–2000	Succeeded by –
