= Diocese of Lake Charles =

Latin Catholic jurisdiction in the US

Coordinates: 30°12′53″N 93°12′31″W

Diocese of Lake Charles Dioecesis Lacus Carolini
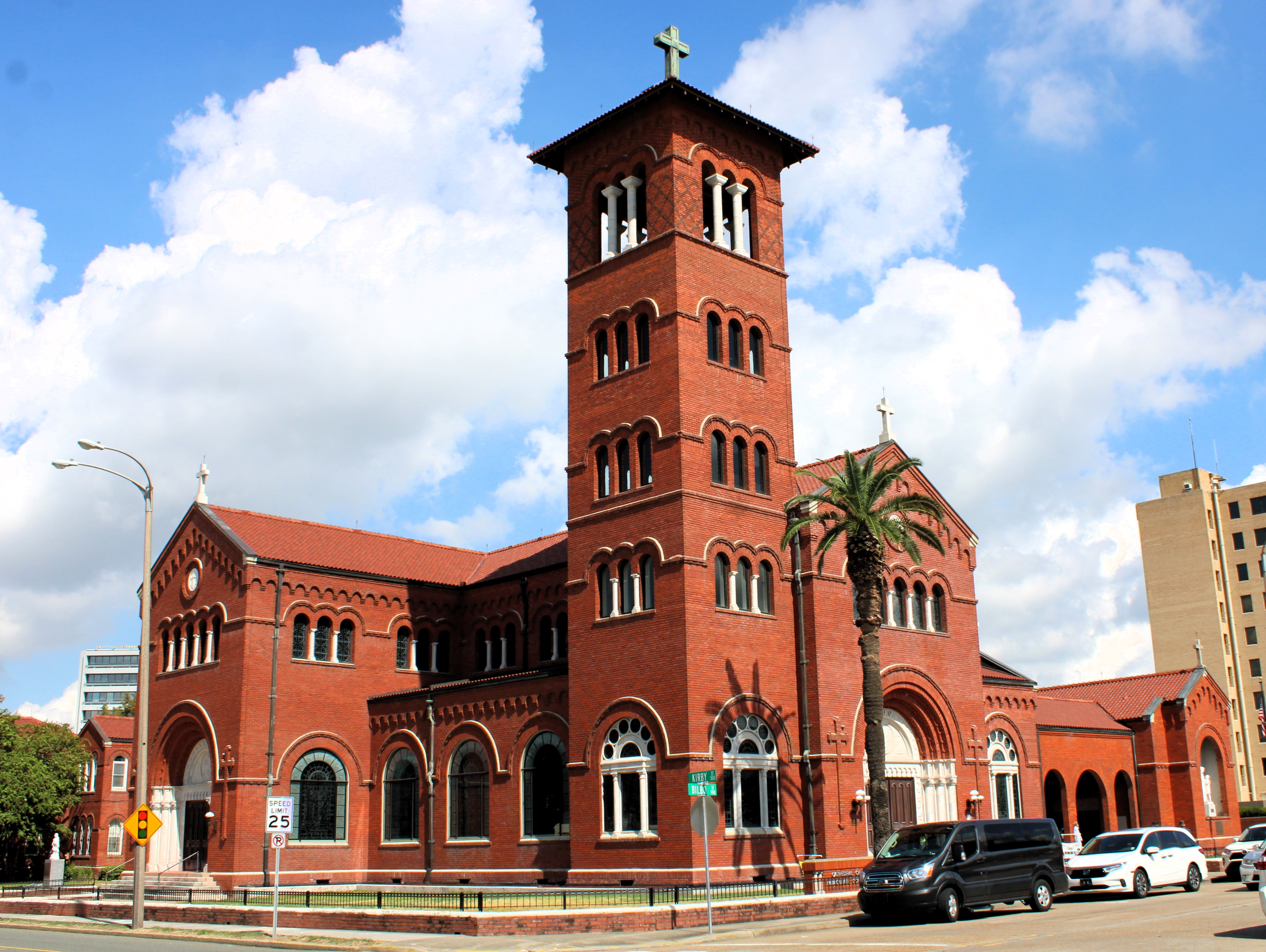
- Cathedral of the Immaculate Conception

- Coat of arms

Location
- Country: United States
- Territory: The Civil Parishes of: Allen, Beauregard, Calcasieu, Cameron, and Jefferson Davis
- Ecclesiastical province: Archdiocese of New Orleans
- Deaneries: 4

Statistics
- Population: 80,519 (29%)
- Parishes: 37
- Schools: 6

Information
- Denomination: Catholic
- Sui iuris church: Latin Church
- Rite: Roman Rite
- Established: January 29, 1980
- Cathedral: Cathedral of the Immaculate Conception
- Patron saint: Mary Immaculate, Mother of Jesus; St. Peter Claver
- Secular priests: 46

Current leadership
- Pope: Leo XIV
- Bishop: Glen John Provost
- Metropolitan Archbishop: James F. Checchio

Map
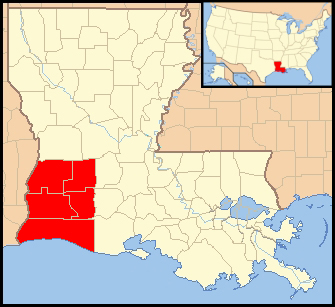

Website
- lcdiocese.org

The Diocese of Lake Charles (Latin: Dioecesis Lacus Carolini), is a diocese of the Catholic Church in southwestern Louisiana in the United States. It is a suffragan see of the metropolitan Archdiocese of New Orleans.

The diocese includes the civil parishes of Allen, Beauregard, Calcasieu, Cameron, and Jefferson Davis. The Cathedral of the Immaculate Conception in Lake Charles is its cathedral church, and Glen John Provost is the bishop.

== History ==
=== 1793 to 1980 ===
During the latter part of the 18th century, when Louisiana was a Spanish colony, there were few Catholics and no churches for them in the Lake Charles area. Pope Pius VI in 1793 erected the Diocese of Louisiana and the Two Floridas, encompassing all of Spanish Louisiana.

France in 1800 gained control of Louisiana with the signing of the Third Treaty of San Ildefonso. However, three years later, the French Emperor Napoleon Bonaparte sold these colonies to the United States in the Louisiana Purchase. Louisiana was now part of the United States. In 1825, the Vatican renamed the Diocese of Louisiana and the Two Floridas as the Diocese of New Orleans.

During the 1850s, missionaries from Texas and Abbeville started visiting the Lake Charles area. The first Catholic chapel in the area, Saint Francis de Sales, was constructed in Lake Charles in 1858 and became a parish in 1869.It was the predecessor of the Church of the Immaculate Conception. The Sisters of Charity of the Incarnate Word from Galveston, Texas, opened St. Patrick's Hospital in Lake Charles in 1908.It is today Christus Ochsner St. Patrick Hospital.

Pope Benedict XV erected the Diocese of Lafayette in Louisiana on January 11, 1918, with territory taken from the Archdiocese of New Orleans. The new diocese included the Lake Charles area for the next 62 years. The Church of the Immaculate Conception in Lake Charles was built in 1913.

=== 1980 to present ===
Pope John Paul II erected the Diocese of Lake Charles on January 29, 1980, taking its territory from the Diocese of Lafayette in Louisiana. He named Jude Speyrer as the first bishop of Lake Charles. Speyrer designated the Church of the Immaculate Conception as the diocesan cathedral. Speyrer retired in 2000 after 20 years as bishop. The second bishop of Lake Charles was Auxiliary Bishop Edward Braxton of the Archdiocese of St. Louis, named by John Paul II in 2000. The same pope selected Braxton in 2005 to serve as bishop of the Diocese of Belleville.

In September 2005, the diocese was hit by Hurricane Rita. The storm destroyed three chapels and heavily damaged four churches. Sacred Heart of Jesus / Saint Katharine Drexel School in Lake Charles also suffered heavy damage. The diocese received $3 million from Catholic Charities USA to aid in its recovery.

To replace Braxton. Pope Benedict XVI in 2007 appointed Glen Provost from the Diocese of Lafayette in Louisiana. Hurricane Ike hit the diocese in 2008. Four churches that were still under restoration from Hurricane Rita were damaged again. The diocese in 2015 launched the Return to the Lord capital campaign to raise $16 million. The plan was to restore the Cathedral of the Immaculate Conception and fund Camp Karol, a Catholic youth camp in Lake Charles.

Several churches and schools in the diocese sustained damage due to Hurricane Laura in August 2020 and Hurricane Delta in October 2020.In 2021, the Institute of Christ the King Sovereign Priest opened the St. Francis de Sales Oratory in Sulphur. The building had served as Our Lady of Prompt Succor Catholic Church until being converted into a secular facility.

=== Sexual abuse ===
Police arrested Mark Broussard, a diocesan priest, in March 2012 on multiple charges of aggravated battery and sexual battery. He was accused of sexually abusing three boys as young as eight-years-old between 1986 and 1989 at Our Lady Queen of Heaven and St. Henry's Parishes in Lake Charles. Diocesan officials knew that he had had sexual contact with at least four other children, but never reported the crimes to law enforcement. Broussard left the priesthood in 1995.

Broussard was ultimately charged with ten counts of abuse. One of Broussard's victims sued the diocese in February 2013. Broussard was convicted in February 2016 of aggravated rape, molestation of a juvenile, and aggravated oral sexual battery. He was sentenced in March 2016 to 250 years in prison.In April 2019, the diocese released a list of 11 clergy with credible accusations of sexual abuse of minors.

== Bishops ==
=== Bishops of Lake Charles ===
1. Jude Speyrer (1980-2000)
2. Edward Kenneth Braxton (2000-2005), appointed Bishop of Belleville
3. Glen John Provost (2007–present)

=== Other diocesan priest who became a bishop ===
- Sam Joseph Galip Jacobs, appointed Bishop of Alexandria in 1989
- Robert P. Boxie III, appointed Auxiliary Bishop of Washington in 2026

== Schools ==
The Diocese of Lake Charles operates six schools, including one high school, St. Louis Catholic High School in Lake Charles.
