= Joseph Henry Leo Schlarman =

American prelate

His Excellency, The Most Reverend Joseph Henry Leo Schlarman
- Archbishop ad personam Bishop of Peoria
- See: Diocese of Peoria
- In office: June 17, 1930; November 10, 1951
- Predecessor: Edmund Michael Dunne
- Successor: William Edward Cousins

Orders
- Ordination: June 29, 1904 by Johannes Baptist Katschthaler
- Consecration: June 17, 1930 by George Mundelein

Personal details
- Born: February 23, 1879 Breese, Illinois, USA
- Died: November 10, 1951 (aged 72) Peoria, Illinois. USA
- Denomination: Roman Catholic
- Education: Quincy College; University of Innsbruck; Pontifical Gregorian University
- Motto: Domine dirige nos (Lord, guide us)

Joseph Henry Leo Schlarman (February 23, 1879 – November 10, 1951) was an American prelate of the Roman Catholic Church. He served as bishop of the Diocese of Peoria in Illinois from 1930 until his death in 1951. In 1951, Schlarman received the personal title of archbishop from the Vatican.

== Biography ==
=== Early life ===
One of ten children, Joseph Schlarman was born on February 23, 1879, in Breese, Illinois, to Bernard and Philomena (née Keyser) Schlarman. His grand-nephew was Stanley Girard Schlarman, a bishop of the Diocese of Dodge City in Kansas. Philomena Schlarman was born in Germany, and his paternal grandparents were from Hanover.

As a young boy, Schlarman walked two miles to school every morning and attended daily mass. For three years after graduating from grade school, he worked the fields in the summer and went to school in the fall, studying until the corn planting season arrived the next spring. Planning to enter medicine, Schlarman studied at Quincy College in Quincy, Illinois, for four years. After deciding to enter the priesthood, Schlarman studied theology at the University of Innsbruck in Innsbruck in Austria-Hungary.

Schlarman was ordained a priest in Brixen in Austria-Hungary by Cardinal Johannes Baptist Katschthaler for the Diocese of Belleville on June 29, 1904. He then attended the Pontifical Gregorian University in Rome, earning a Doctor of Canon Law degree in 1907. After returning to Illinois, Schlarman served as a curate at the Cathedral of Saint Peter Parish in Belleville, Illinois, from 1907 until 1909. He was then appointed chancellor of the diocese.

=== Bishop of Peoria ===
On April 19, 1930, Schlarman was appointed the third bishop of Peoria by Pope Pius XI. He received his episcopal consecration on June 17, 1930, from Cardinal George Mundelein, with Bishops Henry J. Althoff and Edward Hoban serving as co-consecrators, at the Cathedral of Saint Peter. From 1936 to 1937, Schlarman served as chair of Illinois Governor Henry Horner's Commission for Study of Prison Problems.

In 1943 and 1944, Schlarman served as president of the National Catholic Rural Life Conference, an organization founded to improve the quality of life in rural areas. In an address to that conference in November 1944, Schlarman said that the U.S. Government should plan to relocate many war veterans to farming areas once World War II was over. He visited the countryside in Central America and Mexico, and wrote many articles on rural life there. He help plan in 1950 the International Rural Life Congress in Rome, but his health prevented him from attending.

=== Schlarman High School ===
In the early 1940’s, Catholics in the Danville, Illinois area sensed a need for a Catholic high school. Approval for the school was secured from Bishop Joseph H. Schlarman. In 1945, while a site was being secured, the first high school class of 39 students began its freshman year in a specially prepared area of St. Patrick’s Grade School. In April 1946, officials purchased the W. G. Hartshorn estate (called Greystone) at Vermilion Street and Winter Avenue. The mansion had landscaped lawns, a greenhouse and other buildings on 13 acres. Five more acres were purchased, which gave the school frontage on Lake Vermilion. On September 16, 1946, the school officially opened with more than 100 freshmen and sophomores. The school was named Schlarman High School in honor of Bishop Schlarman, who supported the purchase.

=== Death ===
Schlarman was given the personal title of archbishop by Pope Pius XII on June 17, 1951. Suffering from poor health, Schlarman underwent 15 operations and was administered the rite of extreme unction six times. In September 1951, he was well enough to visit Mexico as part of plans to open a seminary in Montezuma, Mexico. He had just published his history book, From Quebec to New Orleans, The Story of the French in America and Mexico, Land of Volcanoes.

Joseph Schlarman died in Peoria on November 10, 1951, from a heart attack, a day after returning from Erie, Pennsylvania, and Chicago. He was age 72. He is buried at St. Mary's Cemetery in Peoria.

== Publications ==
From Quebec to New Orleans, The Story of the French in America and Mexico, Land of Volcanoes.

Catholic Church titles
Preceded by Edmund Michael Dunne	Bishop of Peoria; 1930–1951	Succeeded by William Edward Cousins
