= Michael George McGovern =

American cleric

His Excellency, The Most Reverend Michael George McGovern
- Metropolitan Archbishop of Omaha
- Archdiocese: Omaha
- Appointed: March 31, 2025
- Installed: May 7, 2025
- Predecessor: George Joseph Lucas
- Previous post: Bishop of Belleville (2020-2025)

Orders
- Ordination: May 21, 1994 by Joseph Bernardin
- Consecration: July 22, 2020 by Blase J. Cupich, George J. Rassas, and Edward Braxton

Personal details
- Born: July 1, 1964 (age 62) Chicago, Illinois, US
- Motto: Vos autem dixi amicos (I have called you friends)
- Coat of arms: Michael George McGovern's coat of arms

Styles of Michael George McGovern
- Reference style: His Excellency; The Most Reverend
- Spoken style: Your Excellency
- Religious style: Archbishop

Coat of Arms as bishop of Belleville

Michael George McGovern (born July 1, 1964) is an American Catholic prelate who serves as Metropolitan Archbishop of Omaha.

== Biography ==
=== Early life ===
Michael McGovern was born in Evergreen Park, Illinois. on July 1, 1964 to Joseph and Eleanor McGovern. He grew up in Chicago's Beverly neighborhood and attended Christ the King Grammar School. McGovern then entered St. Ignatius College Prep in Chicago, serving as a lector there and at his family's church.

McGovern entered Loyola University Chicago in 1982, where he earned a Bachelor of Sacred Theology degree in 1986. After working for four years, McGovern decided to enter the priesthood. He enrolled at University of Saint Mary of the Lake in Mundelein, Illinois in 1990. McGovern received a Bachelor of Theology degree from Saint Mary in 1993 and a Master of Divinity degree from it in 1994.

=== Priesthood ===
On May 21, 1994, Cardinal Joseph Bernardin ordained McGovern to the priesthood for the Archdiocese of Chicago in Holy Name Cathedral in Chicago. After his ordination, McGovern was an associate pastor at Queen of the Universe parish in Chicago from 1995 to 1998 and St. Mary in Lake Forest, Illinois from 1998 to 1999. Also in 1998, Cardinal Francis George named McGovern as associate chancellor of the archdiocese. McGovern left St. Mary in 1999 to serve as vice chancellor, then in 2000 as the archbishop’s delegate for extern and international priests. In 2003, the archdiocese assigned him as associate pastor of St. Juliana Parish. McGovern was appointed as pastor of St. Mary Parish in 2004, remaining in that position for the next 12 years.

In addition to his service at St. Mary, Cardinal George appointed McGovern as the dean of Deanery 1-A. In 2013, he became a board member of St. Ignatius. McGovern was transferred from St. Mary to serve as pastor of St. Raphael the Archangel Parish in Old Mill Creek, Illinois in 2016. Cardinal Blase Cupich named him as interim vicar of the archdiocese in February 2020.

=== Bishop of Belleville ===
On April 3, 2020, Pope Francis appointed McGovern as bishop of Belleville. His consecration took place on July 22, 2020, at the Cathedral of Saint Peter in Belleville. His principal consecrator was Cardinal Blase Cupich, with Bishops George J. Rassas, and Edward Braxton serving as co-consecrators.

On October 27, 2020, McGovern removed Reverend Anthony Onyango from his position as administrator for two parishes, citing an allegation of "inappropriate behavior" with a minor.

In July 2022, McGovern announced plans to sell bishop's residence; he would move to a more modest space in the Cathedral of St. Peter rectory. The proceeds would subsidize several ministries and charities, including a fund for expectant mothers and children.

=== Metropolitan Archbishop of Omaha ===
On March 31, 2025, McGovern was appointed by Pope Francis as metropolitan archbishop of Omaha following the resignation of George Joseph Lucas. McGovern was installed on May 7, 2025.

== See also ==
- Catholic Church hierarchy
- Catholic Church in the United States
- Historical list of the Catholic bishops of the United States
- List of Catholic bishops of the United States
- Lists of patriarchs, archbishops, and bishops

Catholic Church titles
Preceded by Edward Braxton	Bishop of Belleville; 2020-2025	Succeeded by Godfrey Mullen
Preceded by George Joseph Lucas	Archbishop of Omaha; 2025-Present	Succeeded by Incumbent
