= Edmund Dunne =

Edmund Dunne may refer to:

- Edmund Francis Dunne, American politician and jurist
- Edmund Michael Dunne, American prelate of the Roman Catholic Church
