= Mary Lynne Gasaway Hill =

American poet, writer and professor

Mary Lynne Gasaway Hill, PhD, FRSA
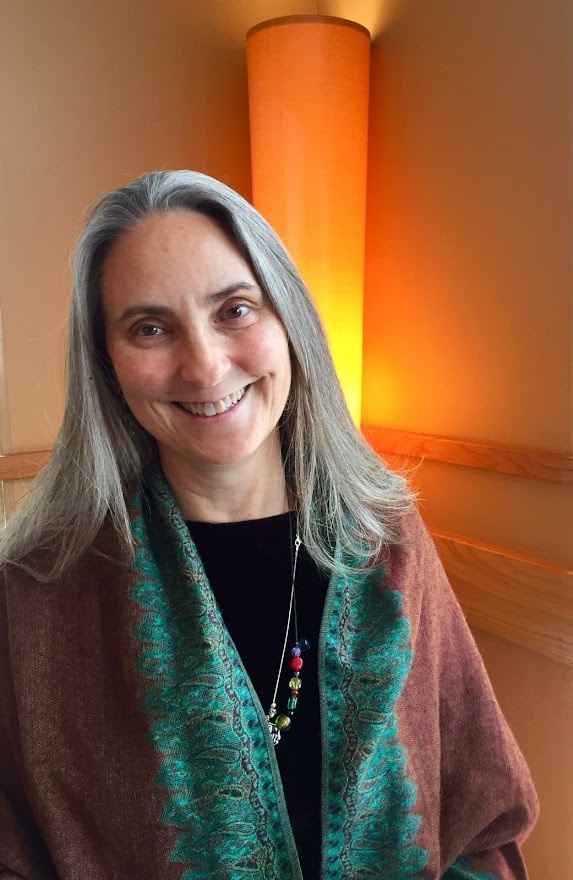

Inaugural Edward and Linda Speed Peace and Justice Fellow
- In office 2015–2016
- Succeeded by: Meghann M. Peace, Ph.D.

Personal details
- Born: July 10, 1964 (age 62) Belleville, Illinois
- Education: St. Mary’s University, Texas, University of Houston, Tulane University
- Occupation: Professor, Poet and Writer

Mary Lynne Gasaway Hill (born 1964) is an American poet, writer and professor. Gasaway Hill is a professor and the inaugural Edward and Linda Speed Peace and Justice Fellow at St. Mary’s University, Texas. She is a Fellow of the Royal Society of Arts.

== Education ==
Gasaway Hill was born in Belleville, Illinois, and was educated at Our Lady Queen of Peace parish school and Althoff Catholic High School.

Gasaway Hill earned her Bachelor of Arts degree in Political Science from St. Mary’s University, Texas in 1986. She received two Master of Arts degrees from St. Mary’s University, Texas in 1990 (Political Science) and 1991 (English) respectively. She then attended the University of Houston earning a Master of Arts in Anthropology degree in 1997, and she earned the Doctor of Philosophy degree in Interdisciplinary Linguistics from Tulane University in 1999.

== Academic career ==
In 2015, Gasaway Hill was appointed the inaugural Edward and Linda Speed Peace and Justice Fellow at St. Mary's University, Texas, where she is a professor.

== Publications ==
She is the author of numerous academic articles and books, including The Language of Protest: Acts of Performance, Identity, and Legitimacy (Palgrave MacMillan, 2018) and Stories from the Wake: The Revolutionary Responses of the Sodality of Bordeaux and Small Christian Communities (NACMS Press, 2005)

Hill also worked with Ginny McNeill Raska, one of Sallie McNeill's descendants, to transcribe, edit, and provide the historical and anthropological context to the original 19th century diary which is the basis of The Uncompromising Diary of Sallie McNeill, 1858-1867 (Texas A&M University Press, 2009).

In 2021, she published the book of poetry, Horizons of Joy: Poetic Thresholds for Winter (River Lily Press, 2021).

== Awards and honors ==
In 2020, she was named as a Fellow of the Royal Society of Arts, in part for her work in the United Kingdom on story, forgiveness, and service locally and internationally at “Storywork: A Summer School in Narrative Practice” at the Corrymeela Community Peace and Reconciliation Centre in Ballycastle, Northern Ireland in 2018 and 2019.

- Alice Franzke Feminist Award, St. Mary’s University, Texas 1990
- Marianist Heritage Award, St. Mary’s University, Texas 2000
- Excellence in Education Award from San Antonio City Council District Seven, 2013
- Inaugural Class of Distinguished Alumni of Althoff Catholic High School, 2015
- Distinguished Faculty Award, St. Mary’s University, Texas 2004
