= Edmund Michael Dunne =

American prelate

His Excellency, The Right Reverend Edmund Michael Dunne
- Bishop of Peoria
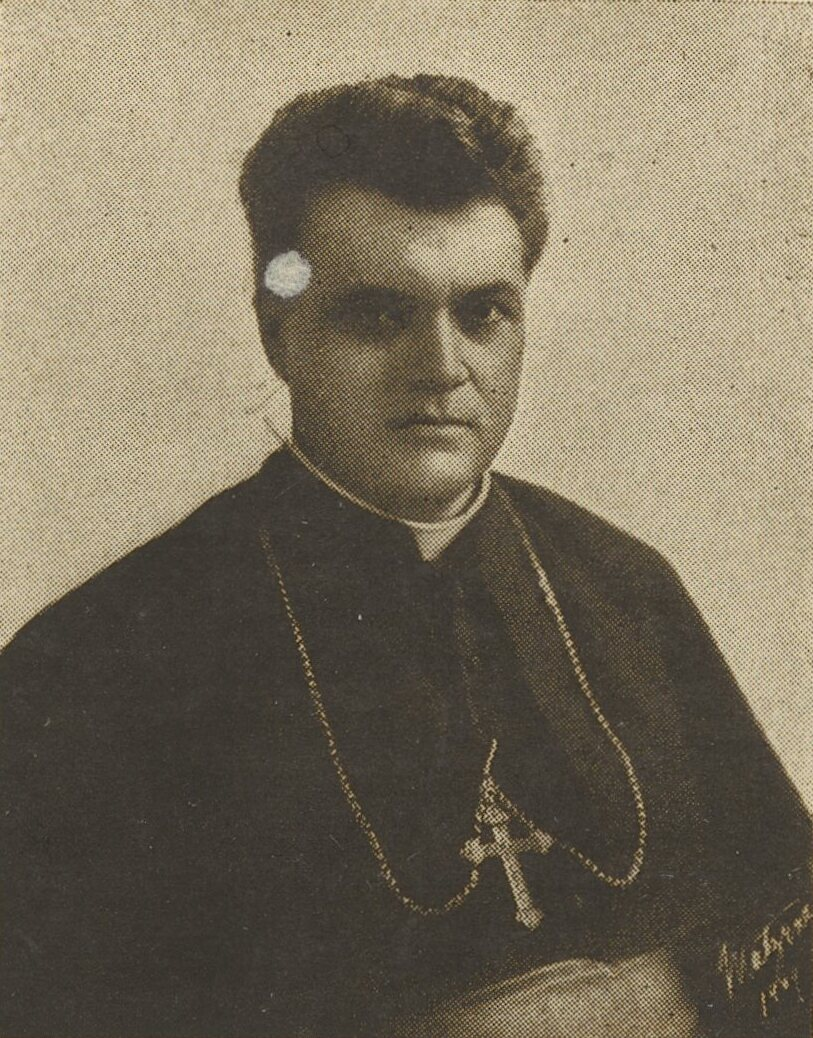
- See: Diocese of Peoria
- In office: September 1, 1909; October 17, 1929
- Predecessor: John Lancaster Spalding
- Successor: Joseph Henry Leo Schlarman

Orders
- Ordination: June 24, 1887 by Patrick Feehan
- Consecration: September 1, 1909 by Diomede Falconio

Personal details
- Born: February 2, 1864 Chicago, Illinois, US
- Died: October 17, 1929 (aged 65)
- Denomination: Roman Catholic
- Education: St. Ignatius College; Niagara University; American College of the Immaculate Conception; Pontifical Gregorian University
- Motto: Defende nos in proelio (Defend us in battle)

Edmund Michael Dunne (February 2, 1864 – October 17, 1929) was an American prelate of the Roman Catholic Church. He served as bishop of the Diocese of Peoria in Illinois from 1909 until his death in 1929.

== Biography ==
=== Early life ===
Edmund Dunne was born on February 2, 1864, in Chicago, Illinois, to an Irish family, and attended the parochial school of Holy Name Cathedral in Chicago He studied at St. Ignatius College in Chicago before entering Niagara University in Lewiston, New York. He completed his theological studies at the American College of the Immaculate Conception in Leuven, Belgium. Dunne could converse in Italian, Polish, Greek and French.

=== Priesthood ===
Dunne was ordained to the priesthood for the Archdiocese of Chicago by Archbishop Patrick Feehan on June 24, 1887. Dunne furthered his studies at the Pontifical Gregorian University in Rome, obtaining a Doctor of Divinity degree in 1890. After returning to Chicago, he received his first pastoral assignment at St. Columbkille Parish in Chicago, where he remained for eight years. He was later named pastor of Guardian Angels Parish and chancellor of the archdiocese.

=== Bishop of Peoria ===
On June 30, 1909, Dunne was appointed as the second bishop of Peoria by Pope Pius X. He received his episcopal consecration on September 1, 1909, from Archbishop Diomede Falconio, with Bishops John Janssen and Peter Muldoon serving as co-consecrators.

During the early 1920s, the future Archbishop Fulton Sheen, a popular television host in the 1950s, was a priest in the diocese. After spending time in pastoral and teaching jobs in the United Kingdom, Dunne told Sheen to return to Peoria in 1925. Both Columbia University in New York and Oxford University in England offered him teaching positions. However, instead of allowing Sheen to take one of these prestigious position, Dunne assigned him as a curate to St. Patrick's, a poor parish in Peoria. Sheen took the assignment without any complaints and enjoyed his time there. Nine months later, Dunne summoned Sheen to his office. Dunne told him:

I promised you to Catholic University over a year ago. They told me that with all your traipsing around Europe, you'd be so high hat you couldn't take orders. But Father Cullen says you've been a good boy at St. Patrick's. So run along to Washington.

Edmund Dunn died on October 17, 1929, at age 65.

== Works ==
- Polemic Chat (1912)
- Memoirs of Zi Pre' (1914)

Catholic Church titles
Preceded by John Lancaster Spalding	Bishop of Peoria; 1909–1929	Succeeded by Joseph Henry Leo Schlarman
