= John Nicholas Wurm =

Fifth Bishop of Belleville, Illinois

His Excellency, The Most Reverend John Nicholas Wurm
- Bishop of Belleville
- See: Diocese of Belleville
- Predecessor: William Michael Cosgrove
- Successor: James Patrick Keleher
- Previous posts: Auxiliary Bishop of St. Louis (1976 to 1981); Titular Bishop of Alestia

Orders
- Ordination: April 3, 1954 by Joseph Ritter
- Consecration: August 17, 1976 by John Carberry

Personal details
- Born: December 6, 1927 St. Louis, Missouri, US
- Died: April 27, 1984 (aged 56) Belleville, Illinois, US
- Motto: Benedicere custodire diligere (To bless, to protect, to love)

Styles of John Nicholas Wurm
- Reference style: The Most Reverend
- Spoken style: His Excellency
- Religious style: Monsignor

John Nicholas Wurm (December 6, 1927 – April 27, 1984) was an American prelate of the Roman Catholic Church. He served as the fifth bishop of the Diocese of Belleville in Illinois from 1981 to 1984. He previously served as an auxiliary bishop of the Archdiocese of St. Louis in Missouri from 1976 to 1981.

== Biography ==
=== Early life ===
John Wurm was born on December 6, 1927, in St. Louis, Missouri, the seventh of fourteen children of Anthony and Rose Wurm. He was baptized on December 18, 1927, at All Souls Church in Overland, Missouri. Wurm attended All Souls Catholic School, the Cathedral Latin School, and Kenrick-Glennon Seminary in St. Louis.

Wurm was ordained a priest for the Archdiocese of St. Louis on April 3, 1954, by Cardinal Joseph Ritter.

=== Auxiliary Bishop of St. Louis ===
Wurm was appointed titular bishop of Plestia and as an auxiliary bishop of St. Louis on June 25, 1976, by Pope Paul VI. Wurm was consecrated bishop on August 17, 1976, at the Cathedral of Saint Louis in St. Louis by Cardinal John Carberry.

=== Bishop of Belleville ===
On September 19, 1981, Wurm was appointed as the fifth bishop of Belleville by Pope John Paul II. Wurm was installed on November 4, 1981.Wurm died on April 27, 1984, in Belleville of cancer.

Catholic Church titles
Preceded by Bolesław Filipiak	Titular Bishop of Plestia; 1976–1981	Succeeded by Anthony Michael Milone
Preceded by –	Auxiliary Bishop of St. Louis; 1976–1981	Succeeded by –
Preceded by William Michael Cosgrove	Bishop of Belleville; 1981–1984	Succeeded by James Patrick Keleher
