= Godfrey Mullen =

American Catholic prelate (born 1966)

His Excellency, The Most Reverend Godfrey Mullen OSB
- Bishop of Belleville
- Church: Catholic Church; Latin Church
- Diocese: Belleville
- Appointed: March 13, 2026
- Installed: May 1, 2026
- Predecessor: Michael George McGovern

Orders
- Ordination: June 5, 1994 by Daniel M. Buechlein
- Consecration: May 1, 2026 by Blase Cupich, Michael George McGovern, and James Golka

Personal details
- Born: January 22, 1966 (age 60) Alton, Illinois, U.S.
- Motto: God loves a cheerful giver

Styles of Godfrey Mullen
- Reference style: His Excellency; The Most Reverend
- Spoken style: Your Excellency
- Religious style: Bishop

Godfrey Mullen, OSB (born January 22, 1966) is an American Catholic prelate who is currently serving as the Bishop of Belleville.

== Early life and education ==
Mullen was born in Alton, Illinois on January 22, 1966. Mullen earned a bachelor's degree in history (1988), a master's degree in theology (1991), and a master of divinity (1994) from St. Meinrad College in Indiana. He later completed a Ph.D. in liturgical studies at The Catholic University of America in 2003. He joined Saint Meinrad Archabbey in Indiana and professed solemn vows as a member of the Order of Saint Benedict on August 15, 1992.

== Priesthood ==
Mullen was ordained a priest on June 5, 1994, and served in many positions in the Diocese of Evansville, including as rector of St. Benedict Cathedral in Evansville, where he also served as dean of the South Deanery and administrator pro tempore of Resurrection Catholic Church. He also held the roles of vicar general and moderator of the curia for the diocese.

Mullen later moved to the Diocese of Belleville, where he became rector of the Cathedral of Saint Peter and served as pastor of both Blessed Sacrament Parish and Queen of Peace Parish. He has also published several articles and books on liturgical topics.

On March 31, 2025, Pope Francis appointed Bishop Michael McGovern of Belleville as the sixth Archbishop of Omaha, creating a vacancy in the diocese. On May 9, 2025, the College of Consultors of the Diocese of Belleville elected Mullen as diocesan administrator to lead the diocese until a new bishop was appointed.

== Episcopal career ==
=== Bishop of Belleville ===
On March 13, 2026, Pope Leo XIV appointed Mullen the tenth Bishop of Belleville. The appointment was announced in Washington, D.C., by Cardinal Christophe Pierre, the Apostolic Nuncio to the United States. He received his episcopal consecration on May 1, 2026, from Cardinal Blase Cupich, with Archbishops Michael George McGovern and James Golka serving as co-consecrators.

== See also ==
- Catholic Church hierarchy
- Catholic Church in the United States
- Historical list of the Catholic bishops of the United States
- List of Catholic bishops of the United States
- Lists of patriarchs, archbishops, and bishops

Catholic Church titles
| Preceded by Michael G. McGovern | Bishop of Belleville; 2026–present | Succeeded by Incumbent |
