= Althoff Catholic High School =

Private high school in Belleville, Missouri, US

Location
- 5401 West Main Street; Belleville, Illinois 62226; United States; 38.5482°N 90.0327°W

Information
- Type: Private school
- Religious affiliation: Roman Catholic
- Established: 1964; 62 years ago
- Oversight: Diocese of Belleville
- Principal: Skip Birdsong
- Grades: 9–12
- Gender: coed
- Enrollment: 305
- Student to teacher ratio: 13:1
- Colors: Navy blue and gold
- Athletics conference: Gateway Metro Conference
- Nickname: The Cru
- Team name: Crusaders
- Accreditation: NCACS
- Newspaper: The Crusader
- Tuition: $9,150-11,250
- Website: althoffcatholic.org

Althoff Catholic High School is a private Catholic institution in Belleville, Illinois, part of the Diocese of Belleville.

== History ==
In 1960, Albert R. Zuroweste, the Bishop of Belleville, met with lay leaders of the Belleville area concerning conditions existing at the Cathedral High School for boys and the Academy of Notre Dame for girls. Since both schools were overcrowded, it was decided that new, co-ed facilities must be provided for students coming in from the area's Catholic grade schools. The high school was dedicated on August 30, 1964, and named in honor of the previous Bishop, Henry J. Althoff. The new high school opened its doors on September 3, 1964.

As of 2008, Althoff has graduated 9,123 students, including 1105 Illinois State Scholars, 2 National Merit Finalists (top 1% of the nation), 91 National Merit commended Students (top 5% in nation), and 22 National Merit Finalists (top 1% in the nation).

== Admissions ==
For potential students, a "Spend-A-Day Program" is offered. When a grade school student does not have school, but Althoff does, they are able to attend classes and lunch with a current ACHS student.

Incoming freshmen must take a placement test, which is used along with 7th and 8th grade transcripts to determine placement in classes. Students with strong grades and scores in the 90% on the placement test are placed in Honors classes.

Transfer students are admitted for the first three years. Seniors are typically not accepted, but it is at the principal's discretion. Transfer requirements include two letters of recommendation, grades, standardized test scores, and transcripts showing that classes taken are similar to Althoff's curriculum.

== Academics ==
Althoff Catholic High School has ten academic departments. These are: art, business, English, foreign language, mathematics, music, physical education, science, social studies, and theology.

Students must take 24 hours to graduate and have more than 100 courses to choose from. Students are required to take four years of theology and English. Three years are required for mathematics, science, and social studies. In addition, Health, Technology Skills, and Information Processing are all required courses for graduation. Two years of an art, music, or foreign language is necessary as well.

To fulfill Althoff's Mission Statement, a retreat each year is required for graduation. Freshmen and Sophomores attend a "Day of Recollection." Juniors attend a closed retreat that is overnight. Lastly, seniors participate in a Senior Service Project. For the first three weeks of January they spend their time giving back to the community. Popular places for this include day cares, grade schools, and nursing homes.

== Athletics ==
The Althoff Crusaders offer both girls and boys athletics, as well as co-ed teams.

Boys athletic teams include: lacrosse, baseball, basketball, football, golf, hockey, soccer, swimming, tennis, volleyball, and wrestling. Girls sports include: basketball, cheerleading, golf, poms, soccer, softball, swimming, tennis, and volleyball. In addition, the co-ed sports are: bowling, track & field, and cross country.

== Notable alumni ==
- Mary Lynne Gasaway Hill, American poet, writer and professor.
- Jordan Goodwin, professional basketball player for Washington Wizards
- Kevin Lisch, member of the 2016 Australian Men's Olympic Basketball team.
- Malcolm L. McCallum, Environmental Scientist, professor
- Jerry Muckensturm, professional football player for the Chicago Bears.
- DaRond Stovall, professional baseball player.
