= John Lancaster Spalding =

American Catholic bishop (1840–1916)

His Excellency, The Right Reverend John Lancaster Spalding
- Bishop of Peoria
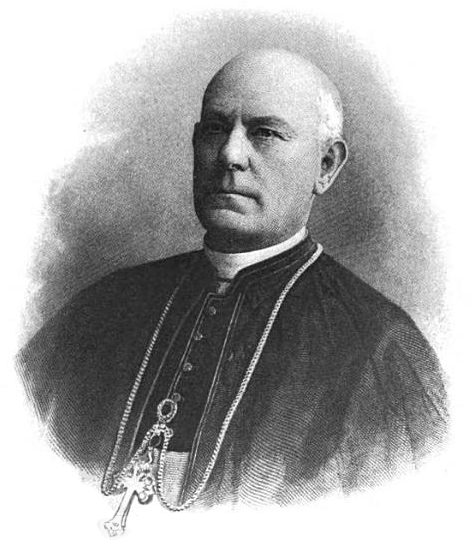
- Church: Catholic
- See: Diocese of Peoria
- Appointed: December 19, 1876
- Successor: Edmund Michael Dunne

Orders
- Ordination: December 19, 1863 by Engelbert Sterckx
- Consecration: May 1, 1877 by John McCloskey

Personal details
- Born: June 2, 1840 Lebanon, Kentucky, US
- Died: August 25, 1916 (age 76) Peoria, Illinois, US
- Education: Mt. St. Mary College; Mount St. Mary's Seminary of the West; American College of the Immaculate Conception

John Lancaster Spalding (June 2, 1840 – August 25, 1916) was an American Catholic author, poet, advocate for higher education, the first bishop of Peoria in Illinois from 1877 to 1908. He was also a co-founder of the Catholic University of America in Washington D.C. and a co-creator of the Baltimore Catechism. Spalding was also a prolific writer on religion and education.

== Biography ==
=== Early years ===
John Spalding was born on June 2, 1840, in Lebanon, Kentucky. His uncle, Martin Spalding, was bishop of Louisville. He was also related to Mother Catherine Spalding, co-founder of the Sisters of Charity of Nazareth.

Spalding graduated in 1856 from St. Mary's College in St. Mary's, Kentucky. He briefly attended Mt. St. Mary College in Emmitsburg, Maryland, then transferred to Mount St. Mary's Seminary of the West in Cincinnati, Ohio. He graduated from Mount St. Mary's in 1859. Martin Spalding then arranged for his nephew to attend the American College of the Immaculate Conception in Louvain, Belgium.

=== Priesthood ===
Spalding was ordained to the priesthood for the Diocese of Louisville in Mechelen, Belgium, by Archbishop Engelbert Streckx on December 19, 1863. After his ordination, Spalding continued his studies at the Belgian Pontifical College in Rome. He returned to Louisville in 1865 to become assistant pastor of the Cathedral of the Assumption Parish. In 1866, Spalding attended the Second Plenary Council of Baltimore as a theologian to Archbishop François Blanchet.

In 1868, Bishop William George McCloskey tasked Spalding with founding the first African-American parish in the diocese. St. Augustine Parish in Louisville opened in 1870. In 1872, Spalding travelled to New York City to write a biography of Martin Spalding, now deceased. During this period, he served as an assistant pastor of the St. Michael Parish in Manhattan.

=== Bishop of Peoria ===
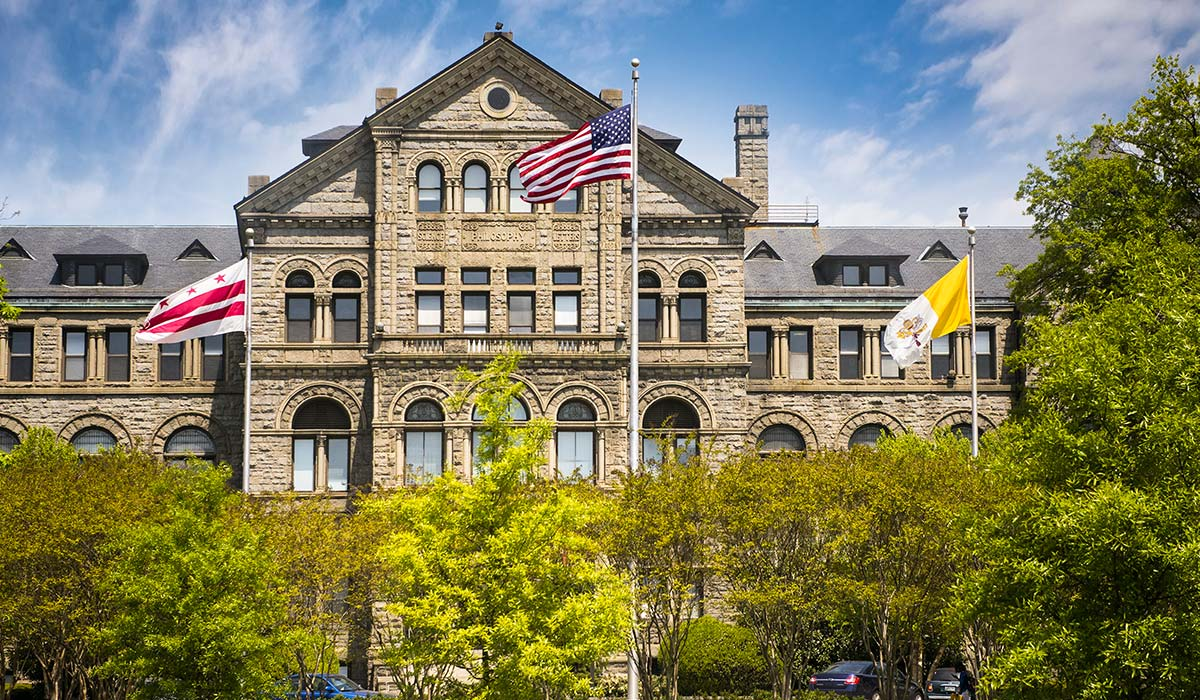
Catholic University of America, Washington, D.C. (2019)

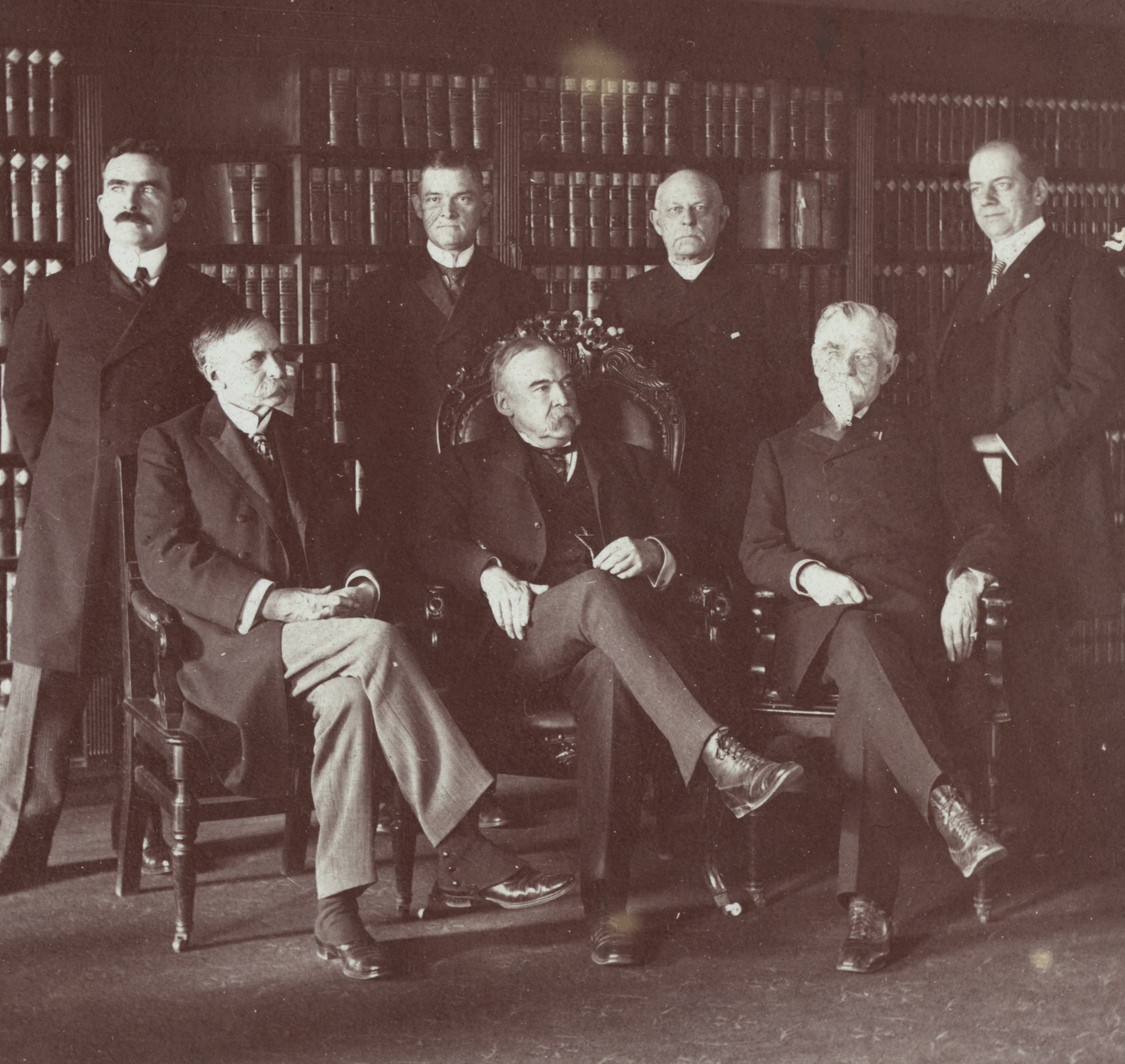
Coal strike arbitration commission. Spalding is standing in the back row, second from the right (1902)

On November 11, 1876, Pope Pius IX appointed Spalding as bishop of the new Diocese of Peoria. He was consecrated at St. Patrick's Old Cathedral in Manhattan on May 23, 1877, by Cardinal John McCloskey, with Coadjutor Bishop Thomas Foley presiding. Spalding founded several Catholic schools in Peoria. He also oversaw the construction of St. Mary's Cemetery in West Peoria, Illinois.

In 1876, Reverend Bernard Baak, pastor of St. Joseph Parish, asked the Sisters of the Third Order of St. Francis in Iowa City, Iowa, to send a contingent of religious sisters to Peoria. Six sisters arrived in Illinois that year and started serving at the city hospital and visiting the sick at home. Shortly after their arrival, Spalding visited the hospital and observed the terrible conditions there. He encouraged them to form a separate congregation in Peoria with the aim of establishing a new Catholic hospital. As their mother superior had no objections, the Sisters of the Third Order of St. Francis of Peoria was established in July 1877. St. Francis Hospital opened in Peoria in 1878.

One of Spalding's ambitions was to found a Catholic university in the United States. He believed it was necessary to educate more American-born priests and to create a Catholic intellectual center in this nation. In 1882, he present his proposal for a university to Pope Leo XIII, who approved it. He also obtained a pledge for $300,000 from family friend Mary Gwendoline Caldwell to start the project. Spalding in 1884 attended the Third Plenary Council of Baltimore, a meeting of all the bishops and archbishops in the United States. The Council approved the acceptance of the Caldwell pledge to start the Catholic University of America.

Another major topic of the Third Plenary Council was the creation of a uniform catechism. The Council authorized the establishment of a commission draft a document.. Spalding and Monsignor Januarius de Concilio of Seton Hall University prepared a draft and distributed it to the bishops. The bishop were to forward their revisions to Spalding, who would report back at the next plenary council. Anticipating long and fruitless discussion, Spalding instead sent the draft directly to Archbishop James Gibbons, noting his changes. Cardinal John McCloskey of New York gave the catechism the imprimatur, Gibbons approved the text, and the catechism was published in April 1885. Though not universally applauded, the Baltimore Catechism remained the standard catechism in the United States for the next eighty years.

Spalding achieved national prominence for helping US President Theodore Roosevelt and banker J. P. Morgan end the Coal Strike of 1902 in Pennsylvania. Spalding served on the arbitration commission that awarded the miners a retroactive 10% wage increase and reduced their work day from 10 to 9 hours. Spalding received an honorary degree from Columbia University in New York City in 1902, and from Western Reserve University in Cleveland in 1904.

=== Retirement and legacy ===
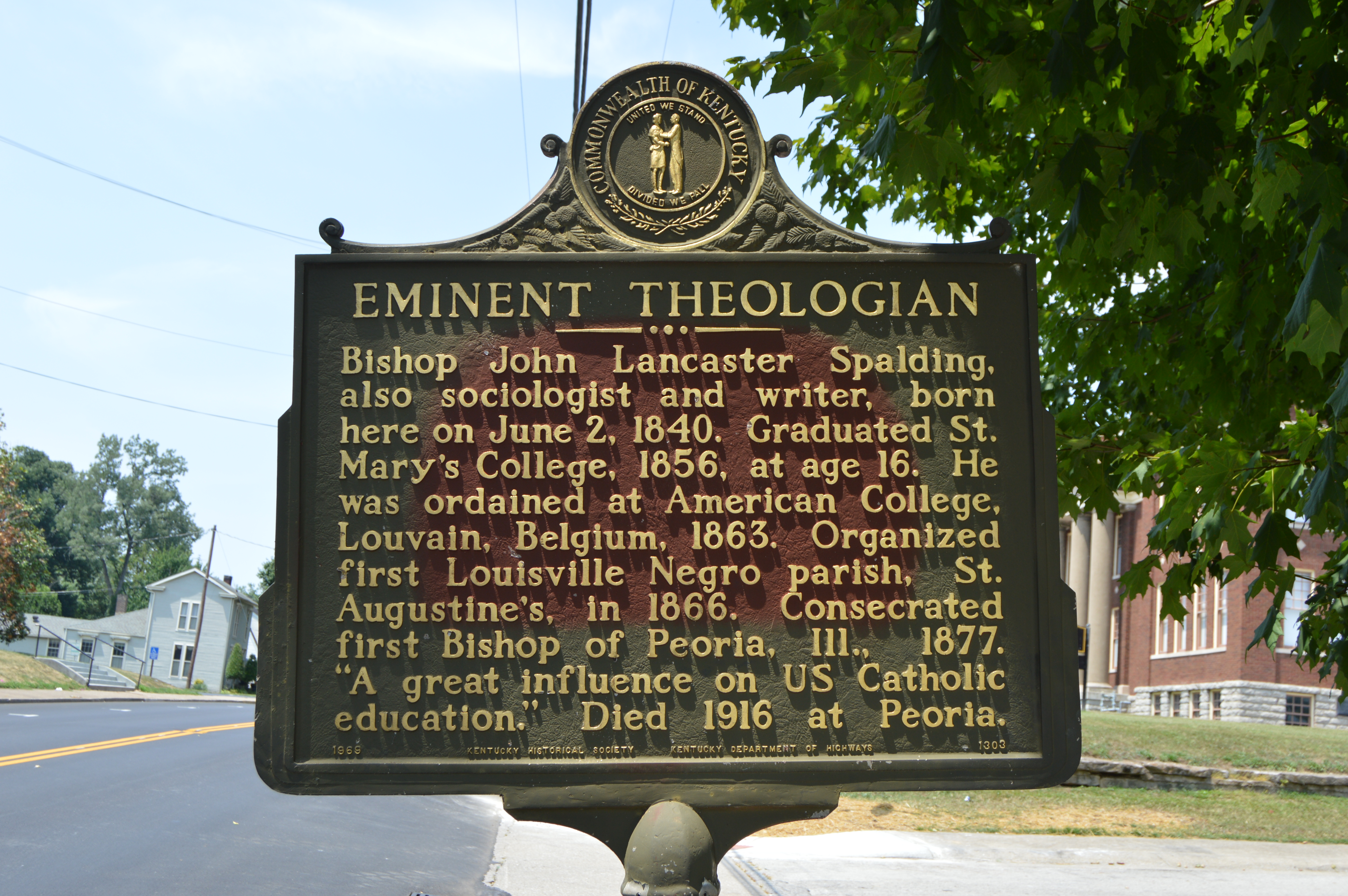
Historical marker commemorating Spalding in Lebanon, Kentucky (2014)

Spalding was paralyzed by a stroke in 1905. Pope Pius X accepted his resignation as bishop of Peoria on September 11, 1908, due to poor health and appointed him titular bishop of Scythopolis with the personal title of archbishop. John Spalding died in Peoria on August 25, 1916, at age 76. The Diocese of Peoria established the John Lancaster Spalding Scholarship, a tuition assistance program for students in the diocese to attend Catholic schools .

The following facilities were named after Spalding:

- The Spalding Pastoral Center, a child care center in Peoria operate by the Diocese of Peoria
- The former Spalding Institute, a Catholic boys high school in Peoria
- The former Spalding Hall at Catholic University of America
- Spalding Catholic School in Alton, Iowa.
- Spalding, Nebraska and Spalding Academy.

== Views on education ==
Spalding believed that education was a fundamental aspect of human life and that it should be grounded in Catholic ideals. He advocated for research in an atmosphere of freedom and improved education of the clergy. Spalding's philosophy of education was centered on the value of human life above all else, and he believed that life should be the ends and means of education. He opposed government interference in education and urged Catholics to support a parochial school system without seeking public financing. Spalding believed that education should be accessible to all, and he was a strong advocate for the education of women, workers, and African Americans. In his writings, Spalding emphasized the role of the teacher and encouraged the development of heroic qualities in students.

== Caldwell sisters ==
William Shakespeare Caldwell, a wealthy Kentucky gas baron, was married to Mary Eliza Breckinridge of the Kentucky Breckinridges. Although Protestant, Mary Eliza had attended Nazareth Academy founded by the Sisters of Charity of Nazareth, and was subsequently baptized Catholic by Bishop Spalding of Louisville. When Mrs. Caldwell died unexpectedly in 1867, "Shake" sought solace in his wife's religion. He founded Sts. Mary and Elizabeth Hospital in Louisville, run by the Sisters of Charity, in her memory; and a home for indigent men in Richmond, operated by the Little Sisters of the Poor. Caldwell moved to New York and enrolled his two daughters, Mary Guendaline and Mary Elizabeth in the Academy of the Sacred Heart on 17th Street. Caldwell died in 1874. Under the terms of his will, he subsidized ten places in the Richmond home for poor individuals of Fredericksburg; He also stipulated that upon reaching the age of twenty-one, his daughters were to donate one-third of their substantial inheritance to establish a Catholic university.

When Mary Guendaline was 21, she gave the money to buy the land for Catholic University and to build Caldwell Hall, which was named after her. Mary Elizabeth funded Caldwell Hall's chapel. Mary Elizabeth married Baron Moritz Curt von Zedtwitz (1851–1896), German Minister to Mexico, and converted to Lutheranism. The sisters travelled extensively in Europe. In 1896, Mary Guendaline married the middle-aged François Jean Louis, Marquis de Montiers-Mérinville in Paris. Bishop John Spalding of Peoria performed the ceremony. In 1904, the sisters broke with the Catholic Church, the Marquise stating that her "honest Protestant blood had asserted itself". She requested that her portrait in Caldwell Hall be removed. According to the New York Times, her actions provoked little surprise as she was in poor health having suffered a stroke two years earlier and "[t]he Marquise is an original character and extremely impulsive." The Marquise separated from her husband in 1905, but paid him an annual stipend of $8,000 in order to keep her title.

In 1906, Mary Elizabeth's book, The Double Doctrine of Rome, in which she takes issue with "Popery", its beliefs, and practices, was published. That same year she sent a letter to The Converted Catholic, stating that Spalding was never their guardian, nor had her parents ever met him.

Spalding was later accused of having an affair with both sisters though the allegation was questionable. The potential for scandal cost Spalding appointment to the See of Chicago and he remained Bishop of Peoria. "[T]here is general consensus that the sisters’ stories about Spalding bore little relation to the facts, that their tragic marriages and psychic illnesses, plus Spalding's unwillingness to arrange an annulment for Mary Elizabeth, contributed to their turning against the church."

== Publications ==
- Essays and Reviews, Hansebooks GmbH (1877)
- Lectures and Discourses, Catholic Publishing Company (1882)
- Education and the Higher Life (1890)
- Aphorisms and Reflections: Conduct, Culture, & Religion (1901)
- Socialism and Labor: And Other Arguments, Social, Political, and Patriotic (1902)
- Religion, Agnosticism and Education, 1902, A.C. McClurg & Company
- Brilliants, From the Writings of Rt. Rev. J. L. Spalding, D.D. 1908

In addition to books published under his own name, Spalding wrote several books and poetry under the pseudonym Henry Hamilton.

- The Poet's Praise
- Opportunity and Other Essays

Catholic Church titles
Preceded by None	Bishop of Peoria; 1877–1908	Succeeded by Edmund Michael Dunne
Preceded by Antonio Maria Bonito	Titular Archbishop of Scythopolis; 1908–1916	Succeeded by Americo Bevilacqua
