= Henry J. Althoff =

American prelate

His Excellency, The Most Reverend Henry John Althoff
- Bishop of Belleville
- See: Diocese of Belleville
- In office: February 24, 1914 - July 3, 1947
- Predecessor: John Janssen
- Successor: Albert Rudolph Zuroweste

Orders
- Ordination: July 26, 1902 by Simon Aichner
- Consecration: February 24, 1914 by James Edward Quigley

Personal details
- Born: August 28, 1873 Aviston, Illinois, US
- Died: July 3, 1947 (aged 73) Belleville, Illinois, US
- Denomination: Roman Catholic
- Parents: Frederick and Theresa (née Poelker) Althoff
- Education: St. Joseph College; St. Francis Solanus College; University of Innsbruck
- Motto: Deus providebit (God will provide)

Henry John Althoff (August 28, 1873 – July 3, 1947) was an American prelate of the Roman Catholic Church. He served as bishop of the Diocese of Belleville in Illinois from 1914 until his death in 1947.

== Biography ==
=== Early life ===
Henry Althoff was born on August 28, 1873, in Aviston, Illinois, to Frederick and Theresa (née Poelker) Althoff. He completed his classical and philosophy studies at St. Joseph College in Teutopolis, Illinois (A.B., 1898) and at St. Francis Solanus College in Quincy, Illinois (M.A., 1899). He then studied theology at the University of Innsbruck in Innsbruck in Austria-Hungary.

=== Priesthood ===
Althoff was ordained to the priesthood in Innsbruck by then Bishop Simon Aichner on July 26, 1902. After returning to Illinois, Althoff served as a curate at a parish in Damiansville, Illinois. In 1903, he was transferred to a parish in East St. Louis, Illinois. He served as pastor of parishes in Okawville, Illinois, and Nashville, Illinois, from 1905 to 1914.

=== Bishop of Belleville ===
On December 4, 1913, Althoff was appointed the second bishop of Belleville by Pope Pius X. He received his episcopal consecration at St. Peter's Cathedral in Belleville, Illinois, on February 24, 1914, from Archbishop James Quigley, with Bishops Peter Muldoon and Paul Rhode serving as co-consecrators. Althoff was noted for his abilities with languages; he was fluent in German, French and Polish, and could maintain a conversation in Croatian, Italian and Lithuanian.

In July 1927, Althoff banned female parishioners from receiving communion if they were wearing makeup, sleeveless tops or low-cut tops. In 1937, Althoff forbade church-sponsored gambling in the diocese, encouraging Catholics to support their parishes by direct contribution rather than parish parties and festivals. Later that year, he banned dancing the night before a holy day. Since New Years Day was a holy day, that meant no parties on New Year's Eve. Atholl was named by the Vatican as an assistant at the pontifical throne on April 15, 1939.

=== Death ===
Henry Althoff died after a three-month illness in Belleville on July 3, 1947, at age 73. Althoff Catholic High School in Belleville is named in his honor.

== Episcopal succession ==
Catholic Church titles
Preceded by John Janssen	Bishop of Belleville; 1914–1947	Succeeded by Albert Rudolph Zuroweste
