= John Janssen =

German-born prelate

His Excellency, The Right Reverend John Janssen
- Bishop of Belleville
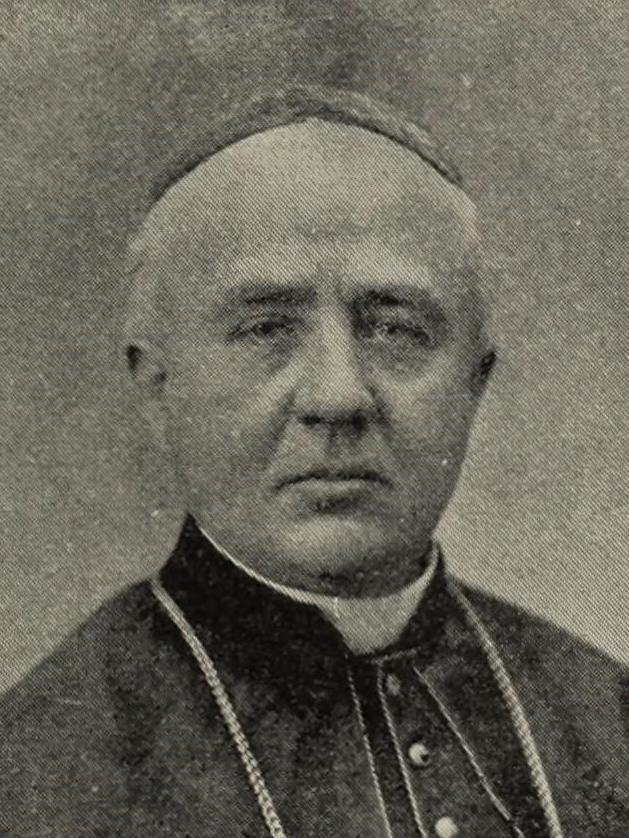
- Church: Roman Catholic Church
- See: Diocese of Belleville
- In office: April 25, 1888—July 2, 1913
- Successor: Henry J. Althoff

Orders
- Ordination: November 19, 1858 by Henry Damian Juncker
- Consecration: April 25, 1888 by Patrick Feehan

Personal details
- Born: March 3, 1835 Keppeln, Rhine Province, Prussia (now Germany)
- Died: July 2, 1913 (aged 78) Belleville, Illinois, USA
- Motto: Ave Maria (Hail Mary)

John Janssen (March 3, 1835 – July 2, 1913) was a German-born prelate of the Roman Catholic Church. He served as the first bishop of the new Diocese of Belleville in Illinois from 1888 until his death in 1913.

== Biography ==
=== Early life ===
Janssen was born on March 3, 1835, in Keppeln, Rheinish in the Kingdom of Prussia (later part of Germany). He studied at the Royal Theological and Philosophical Academy in Munster, Prussia and the Collegium Augustinianum in Goch, Prussia Janssen was recruited in Munster by French Bishop Henry Juncker in 1858 to serve as a priest in the United States.

=== Priesthood ===
After immigrating to the United States, Janssen was ordained to the priesthood by Juncker for the Diocese of Alton in Alton, Illinois on November 19, 1858. After his ordination, he was appointed pastor of Saints Peter and Paul Parish, a German-speaking parish in Springfield, Illinois. Jannsen also ministered to German immigrants in surrounding counties. In 1863, Janssen left his parish to became secretary to Juncker and chancellor of the diocese. He was appointed vicar general of the diocese in 1870, holding that position until 1886. He also served as pastor of St. Boniface Parish in Quincy, Illinois, from 1877 to 1879. Bishop Peter Joseph Baltes eventually appointed Janssen as vicar general. After Baltes' death in 1886, Janssen was named as apostolic administrator for the diocese.

=== Bishop of Belleville ===
Following the division of the Diocese of Alton into the Dioceses of Alton and Belleville, Janssen was appointed bishop of Belleville by Pope Leo XIII on February 28, 1888. He received his episcopal consecration at St. Peter's Cathedral in Belleville, Illinois, on April 25, 1888, from Archbishop Patrick Feehan, with Bishops John Hogan and Louis Fink serving as co-consecrators. By 1902 the diocese contained 104 churches, 94 priests, 64 parochial schools and 50,000 Catholics.

In 1903, at Janssen's request, the Poor Handmaids of Christ religious order set up St. Mary's Hospital in East St. Louis, Illinois. It was open to all patients, regardless of race or religion.

=== Death ===
John Janssen died on July 2, 1913, in Belleview at age 78.

Catholic Church titles
Preceded by none	Bishop of Belleville; 1888—1913	Succeeded by Henry J. Althoff
