= Cathedral of the Immaculate Conception (Lake Charles, Louisiana) =

Historic church in Louisiana, United States

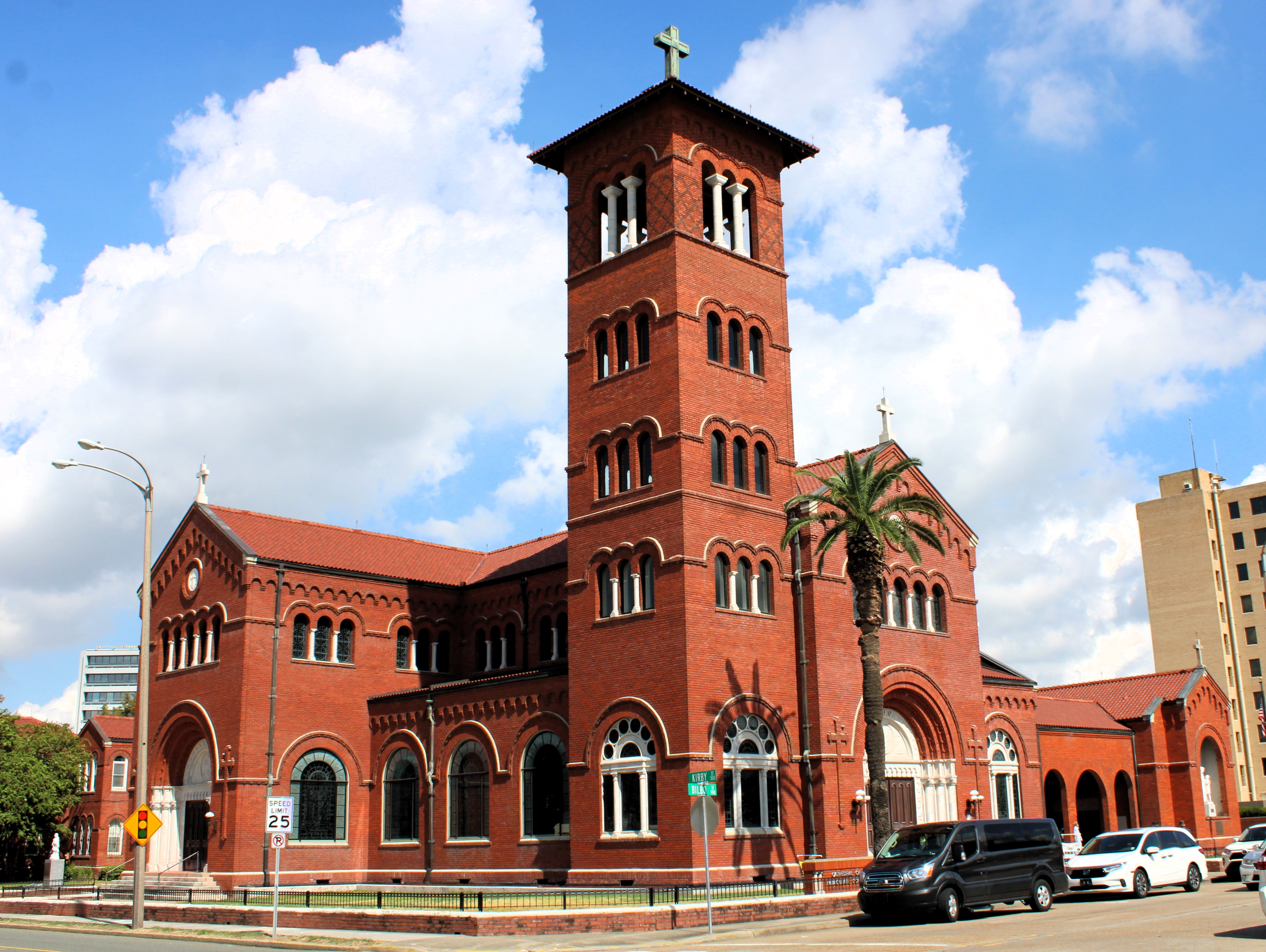
- Cathedral of the Immaculate Conception in 2023
- Cathedral of the Immaculate Conception
- Location: 935 Bilbo Street; Lake Charles, Louisiana
- Country: United States
- Denomination: Catholic Church
- Website: immaculateconceptioncathedral.com

History
- Status: Cathedral/Parish church
- Founded: 1869 (parish)
- Dedication: Immaculate Conception

Architecture
- Functional status: Active
- Architect: Favrot & Livaudais
- Style: Romanesque Revival; Italianate
- Completed: 1913

Specifications
- Materials: Brick

Administration
- Diocese: Lake Charles

Clergy
- Bishop(s): The Most Reverend Glen John Provost, M.A., D.D.
- Rector: Very Reverend Ruben Buller
- Cathedral of the Immaculate Conception
- U.S. National Register of Historic Places
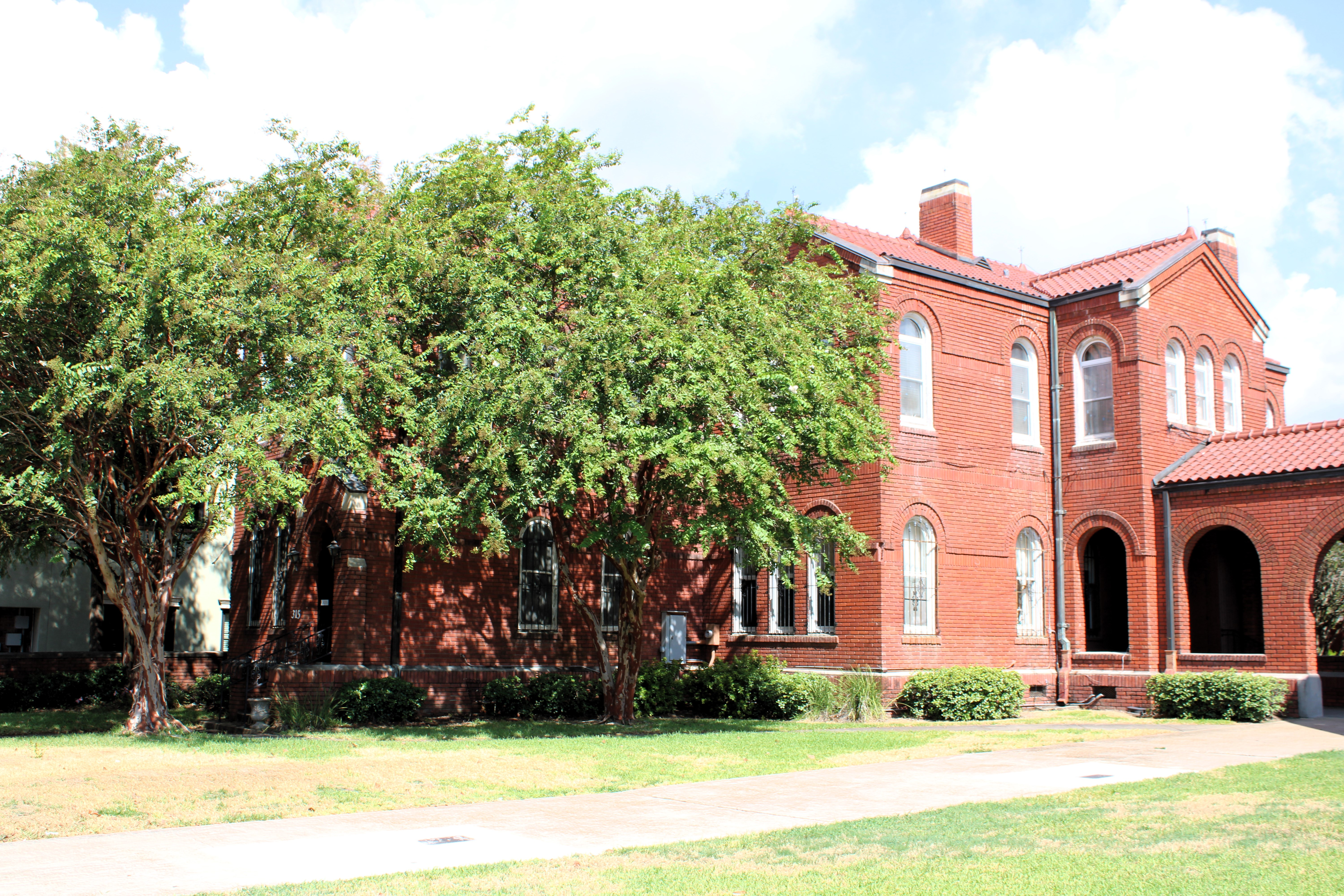
- Rectory

- Location within Louisiana Location within the United States
- Coordinates: 30°13′36″N 93°13′00″W
- Area: 1 acre (0.40 ha)
- Built by: Reinhart and Donovan
- NRHP reference No.: 94001201
- Added to NRHP: October 7, 1994

The Cathedral of the Immaculate Conception is a Catholic cathedral located in Lake Charles, Louisiana, United States. It is the seat of the Diocese of Lake Charles. Immaculate Conception Parish was established in 1869, and it became a cathedral in 1980. The church building, rectory, and a garage are listed together on the National Register of Historic Places.

The cathedral church enshrines a century-old image of the Blessed Virgin Mary of the Immaculate Conception made of Carrara marble. The venerated image was granted a Canonical coronation by Pope Benedict XVI via Pontifical decree signed in 2012. The coronation was presided by Archbishop Carlo Maria Viganò, Apostolic Nuncio to the United States, on August 22, 2013. A full church renovation project was completed in 2019.

== History ==
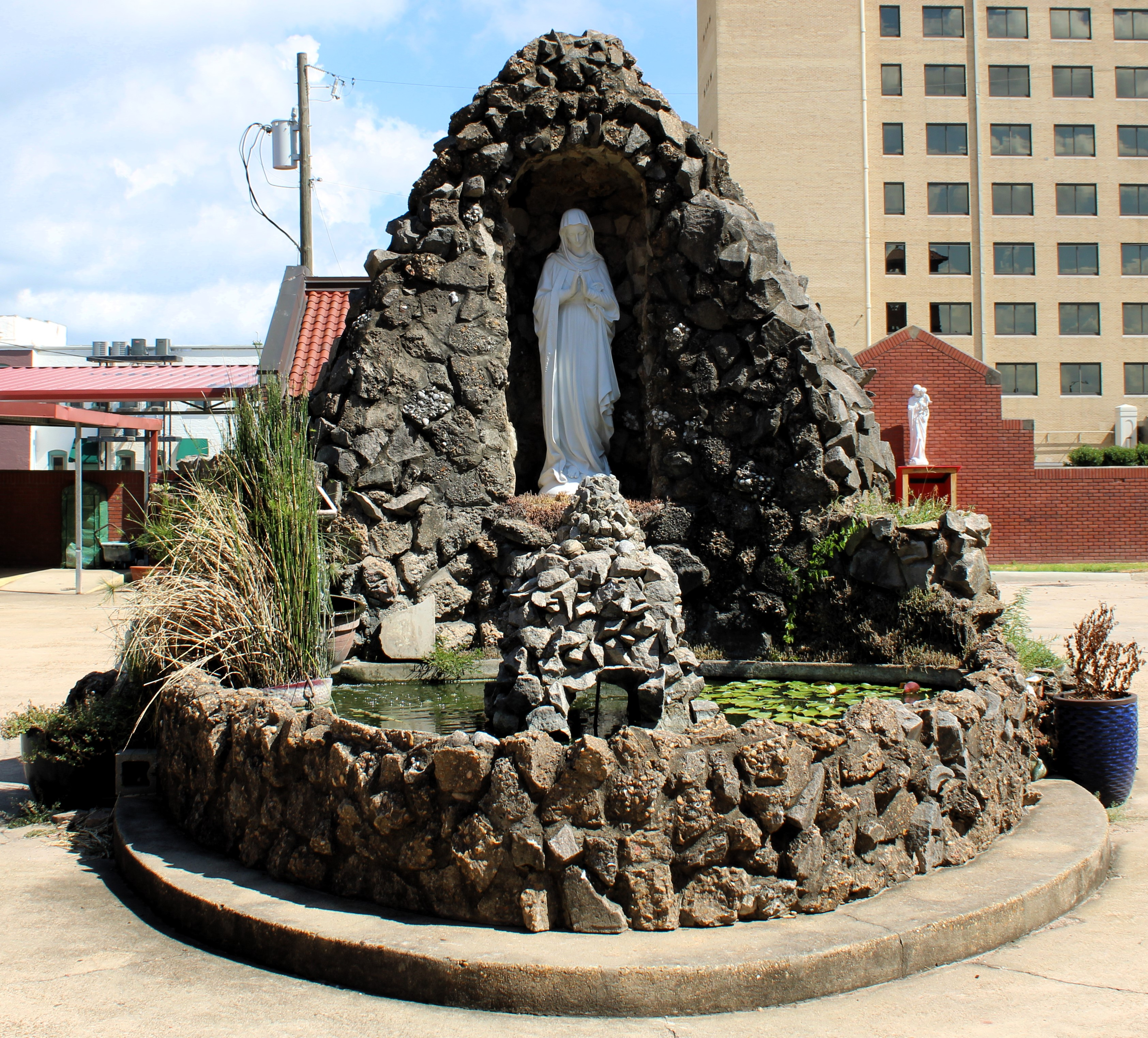
The grotto on the cathedral grounds.

St. Francis de Sales was the first Catholic church in Lake Charles. It was built in 1858 as a mission chapel. The parish was organized in 1869 under the same name and it received its first resident priest at that time. The church was damaged by a hurricane in 1879 and the parish decided to build a new building. The parish was renamed Immaculate Conception at that time, and the new church building was completed in 1881. This church, other parish buildings, as well as neighboring buildings and homes were destroyed in a fire on April 23, 1910.

Plans for the current church were begun at this time. It was designed by the prominent New Orleans architectural firm of Favrot & Livaudais and it was completed in 1913. The attached rectory and garage, which share the church's historic designation, were completed in the same year. The complex was designed in a regional Romanesque Revival style typical of Lombardy in Italy. The three marble altars in the Gothic style were installed in the church in 1923. They were originally in a church in Salt Lake City and were acquired for Immaculate Conception when the church in Utah was remodeled. The marble wainscot was added to the walls of the side aisles and the chancel around 1950. At the same time, the columns in the nave were sheathed in marble and the marble pulpit were added at this time.

A rubble stone grotto that contains a statue of the Blessed Virgin Mary was added to the church property in 1948. A brick wing on the northeast side of the church contains a small chapel. It was designed by the architectural firm of Dunn and Quinn and it was completed in 1973. It matches the church's Romanesque architecture. A courtyard is located between the addition and the church.

On January 29, 1980, Pope John Paul II established the Diocese of Lake Charles and Immaculate Conception became the cathedral for the new diocese.

The church was added to the National Register of Historic Places on October 7, 1994. Its historic significance is attributed to its architectural style. It is the only Romanesque Revival building in Lake Charles, and one of only ten architecturally noteworthy non-residential buildings left in the city after a demolition and modernization campaign from the 1950s to the 1970s.

On August 27, 2020, Hurricane Laura struck the city of Lake Charles. The cathedral and the nearby diocesan chancery building sustained roof damage with the chancery uninhabitable.

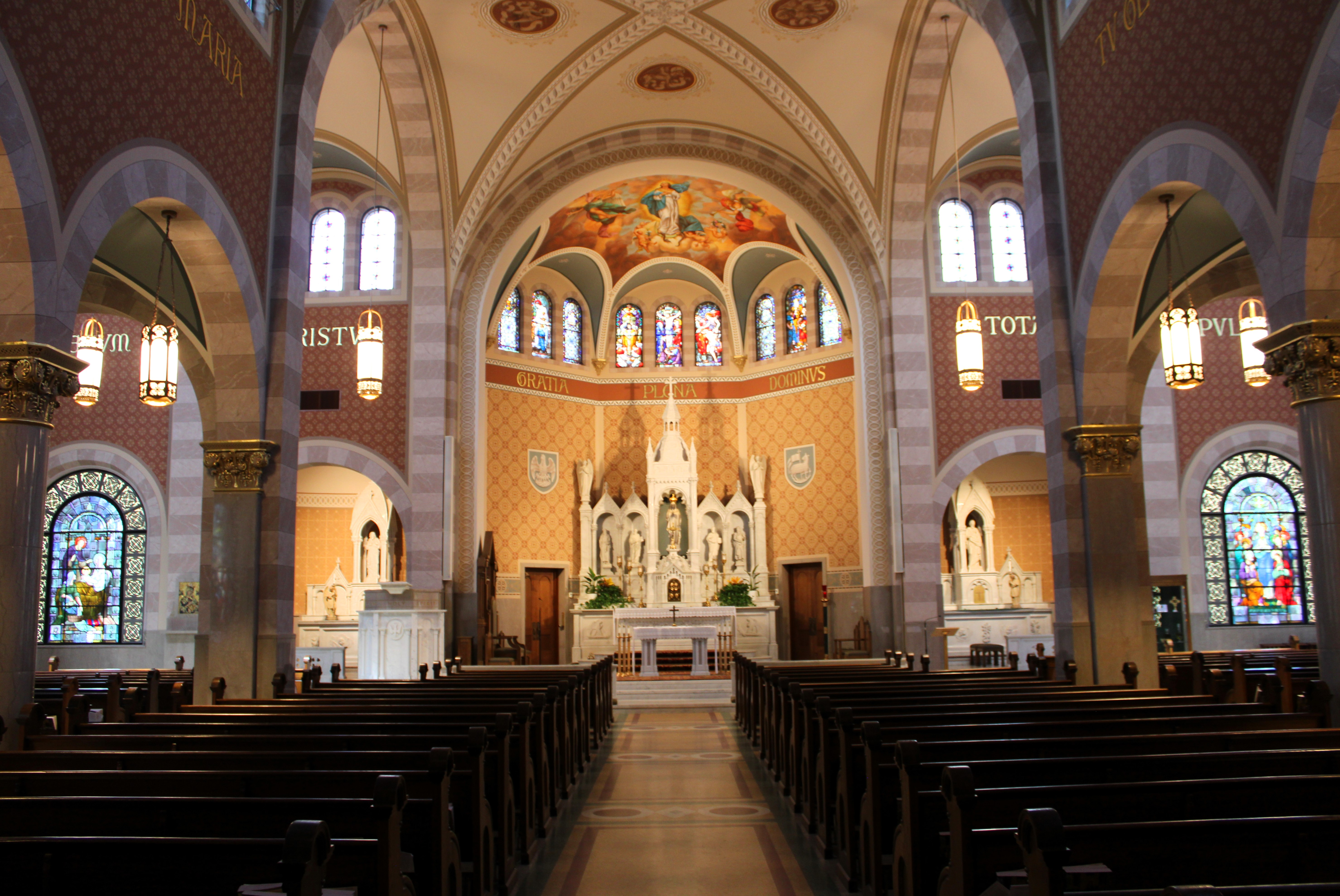
View up the nave toward the chancel.

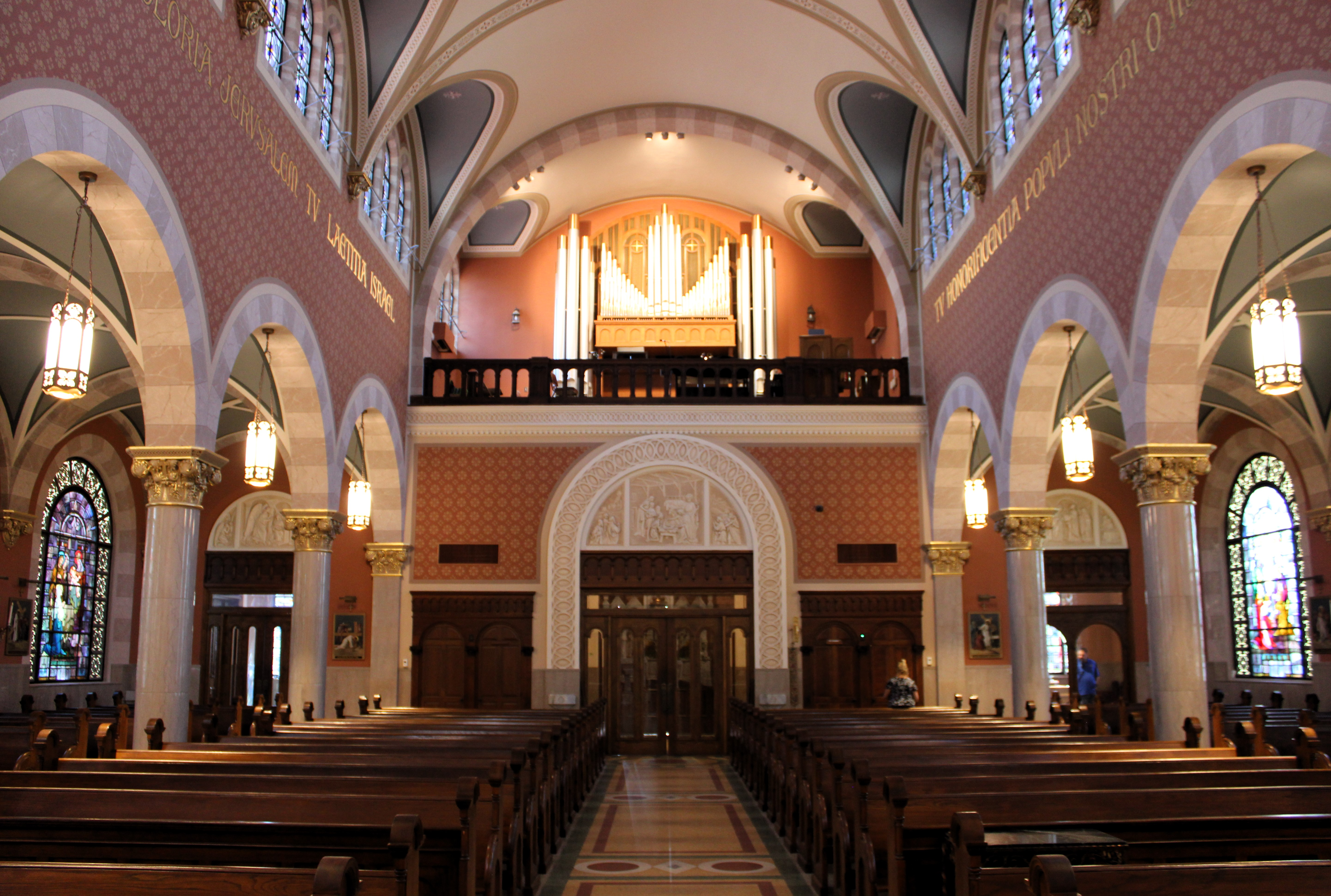
View down the nave toward gallery.

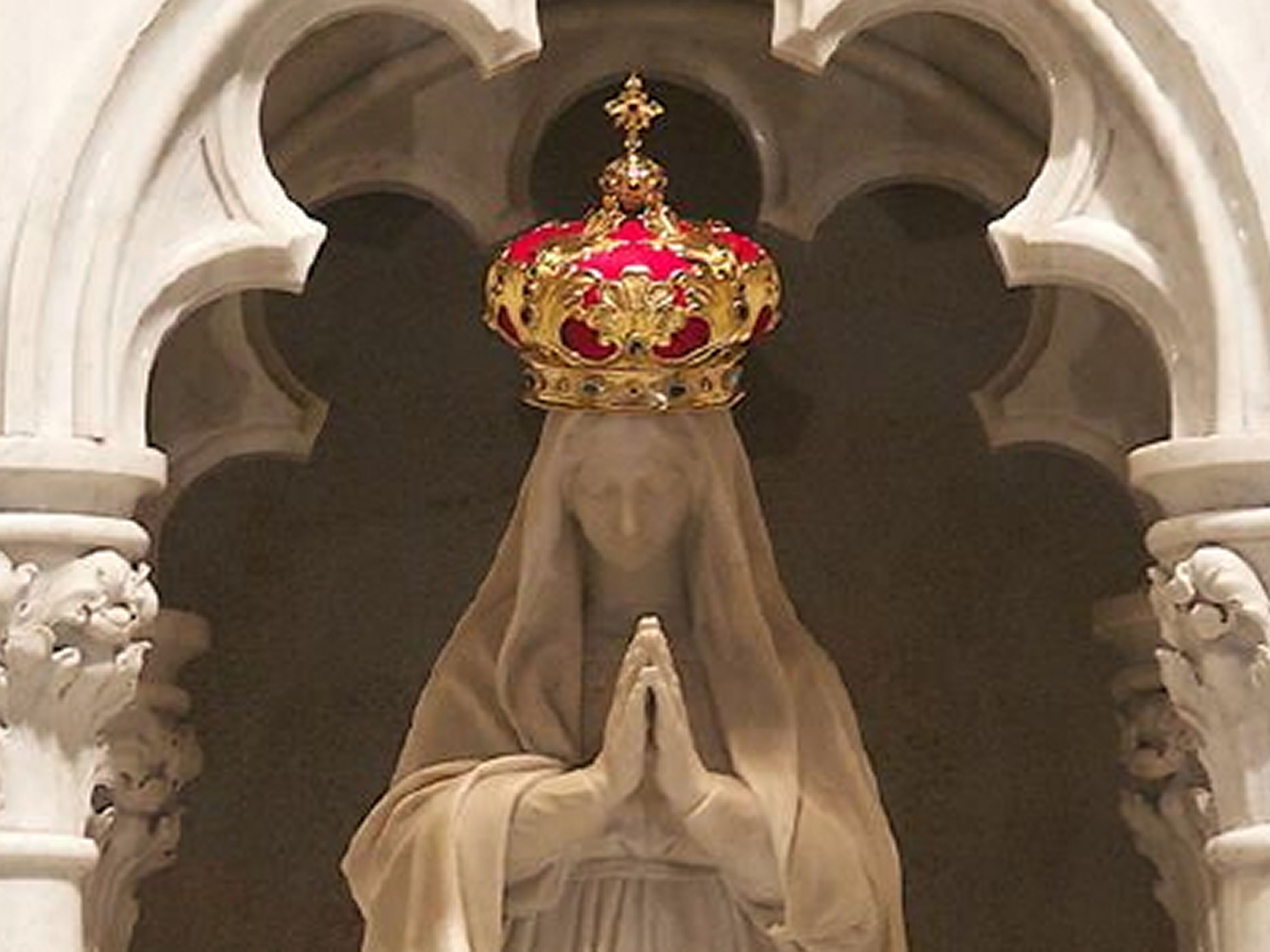
Canonically crowned image of the Virgin Mary.

== School ==
Immaculate Conception Cathedral School is the parish's primary and lower secondary school. It opened on February 19, 1950. As of 2019 it has around 20 teachers and a principal with around 410-430 students. The four-classroom St. Charles Annex addition was established as part of a capital campaign made in 2007; it also has a multipurpose room serving as a library, an art room, and a computer lab.

== See also ==
- National Register of Historic Places listings in Calcasieu Parish, Louisiana
- List of Catholic cathedrals in the United States
- List of cathedrals in the United States
