= Jude Speyrer =

American Roman Catholic bishop (1929–2013)

His Excellency, The Most Reverend Jude Speyrer D.D.
- Bishop of Lake Charles
- See: Diocese of Lake Charles
- In office: 1980–2001
- Successor: Edward Kenneth Braxton

Orders
- Ordination: July 25, 1953 by Maurice Schexnayder
- Consecration: April 25, 1980 by Gerard Louis Frey

Personal details
- Born: April 14, 1929 Leonville, Louisiana, US
- Died: July 21, 2013 (aged 84) Opelousas, Louisiana, US
- Denomination: Roman Catholic
- Motto: To bring glad tidings
- Coat of arms

Jude Speyrer (April 14, 1929 – July 21, 2013) D.D. was an American prelate of the Roman Catholic Church who served as the first bishop of the Diocese of Lake Charles in Louisiana from 1980 to 2000.

== Biography ==
=== Early life ===
Jude Speyrer was born on April 14, 1929, in Leonville, Louisiana, one of 12 children of Emelie and Antoine Speyer. At age 13, he entered Joseph Seminary College, a minor seminary in St. Benedict, Louisiana. He received an Associates of Arts degree there in 1947. He continued his preparation for the priesthood at the Notre Dame Seminary in New Orleans, Louisiana, graduating in 1949 with a Bachelor of Arts degree. That same year, Speyer went to Rome to study at the Pontifical North American College. He transferred in 1950 to the University of Fribourg in Fribourg, Switzerland. Speyer was ordained as a deacon and received a Licentiate of Sacred Theology in 1953.

=== Priesthood ===
Speyrer was ordained to the priesthood for the Diocese of Lafayette in Louisiana at St. John's Cathedral in Lafayette, Louisiana, by Bishop Maurice Schexnayder on July 25, 1953. After his ordination, the diocese assigned Speyrer as an assistant pastor St. Landry Parish in Opelousas, Louisiana. He was later named as chaplain at Our Lady of Wisdom Chapel at the University of Southwestern Louisiana in Lafayette as well as editor of the diocesan newspaper, The Southwest Louisiana Register.

In 1964, Speyer was appointed pastor of Our Lady of the Lake Parish in Lake Arthur, Louisiana, as well as its school administrator. The diocese tasked him in 1969 with founding Our Lady Queen of Peace Parish in Lafayette. The Vatican in 1974 elevated Speyer as chaplain to his holiness. Over the next six years, he served as chancellor and vicar general of the diocese.

=== Bishop of Lake Charles ===
Speyrer was appointed the first bishop of the Diocese of Lake Charles on January 29, 1980, by Pope John Paul II; he was consecrated at the Lake Charles Civic Center in Lake Charles, Louisiana by Bishop Gerard Louis Frey on April 25, 1980. That same year, he started a Sunday morning diocesan television program, Glad Tidings. He helped fund a chapel at the C. Paul Phelps Correctional Center, a state prison outside DeQuincy, Louisiana. In 1995, Speyer started construction of the Saint Charles Center, a retreat and spirituality center in Moss Bluff, Louisiana.

=== Retirement and legacy ===
On December 12, 2000, John Paul II accepted Speyer's resignation as bishop of Lake Charles. In 2008, Speyer established fund for the education of diocesan priests. Jude Speyrer died on July 21, 2013, in Opelousas, aged 84.

== Notes ==
Catholic Church titles
Preceded by None (diocese erected)	Bishop of Lake Charles; 1980–2001	Succeeded by Edward Kenneth Braxton
