= William Michael Cosgrove =

American bishop (1916–1992)

His Excellency, The Most Reverend William Michael Cosgrove
- Bishop of Belleville
- See: Diocese of Belleville
- In office: October 28, 1976 - May 19, 1981
- Predecessor: Albert Rudolph Zuroweste
- Successor: John Nicholas Wurm
- Previous post: Auxiliary Bishop of Cleveland (1968 to 1976)

Orders
- Ordination: December 18, 1943 by Edward Francis Hoban
- Consecration: September 3, 1968 by Clarence George Issenmann

Personal details
- Born: November 26, 1916 Canton, Ohio, USA
- Died: December 11, 1992 (aged 76)
- Denomination: Roman Catholic
- Education: John Carroll University
- Motto: Rejoice in Christ

William Michael Cosgrove (November 26, 1916 – December 11, 1992) was an American prelate of the Roman Catholic Church. He served as bishop of the Diocese of Belleville in Illinois from 1976 to 1981. He previously served as an auxiliary bishop of the Diocese of Cleveland in Ohio from September 3, 1968, to October 28, 1976.

== Biography ==
=== Early life ===
Cosgrove was born on November 26, 1916, in Canton, Ohio. He attended Saint Ignatius High School in Cleveland, Ohio, and John Carroll University in University Heights, Ohio. Cosgrove was ordained to the priesthood for the Diocese of Cleveland by Bishop Edward Francis Hoban in Cleveland on December 18, 1943.

=== Auxiliary Bishop of Cleveland ===
On June 12, 1968, Cosgrove was appointed as an auxiliary bishop of Cleveland and titular tishop of Trisipa by Pope Paul VI. He received his episcopal consecration in Cleveland on September 3, 1968, from Bishop Clarence Issenmann with bishops John Whealon and Harold Perry as co-consecrators.

=== Bishop of Belleville ===
Cosgrove was named the fourth bishop of Belleville on August 30, 1976, by Pope John Paul II. Cosgrove was installed on October 28, 1976. The author Michael Gallagher described Cosgrove as a man of deep social concern who was popular with both clergy and laity.

On May 19, 1981, John Paul II accepted Cosgrove's resignation as bishop of Belleville. William Cosgrove died on December 11, 1992, at age 76. The Bishop William M. Cosgrove Center, a center for the homeless in Cleveland, is named after him.

Catholic Church titles
Preceded by Albert Rudolph Zuroweste	Bishop of Belleville; 1976—1981	Succeeded by John Nicholas Wurm
