= Diocese of Belleville =

Latin Catholic jurisdiction in the US

Coordinates: 38°31′18″N 89°59′43″W

Diocese of Belleville Diœcesis Bellevillensis
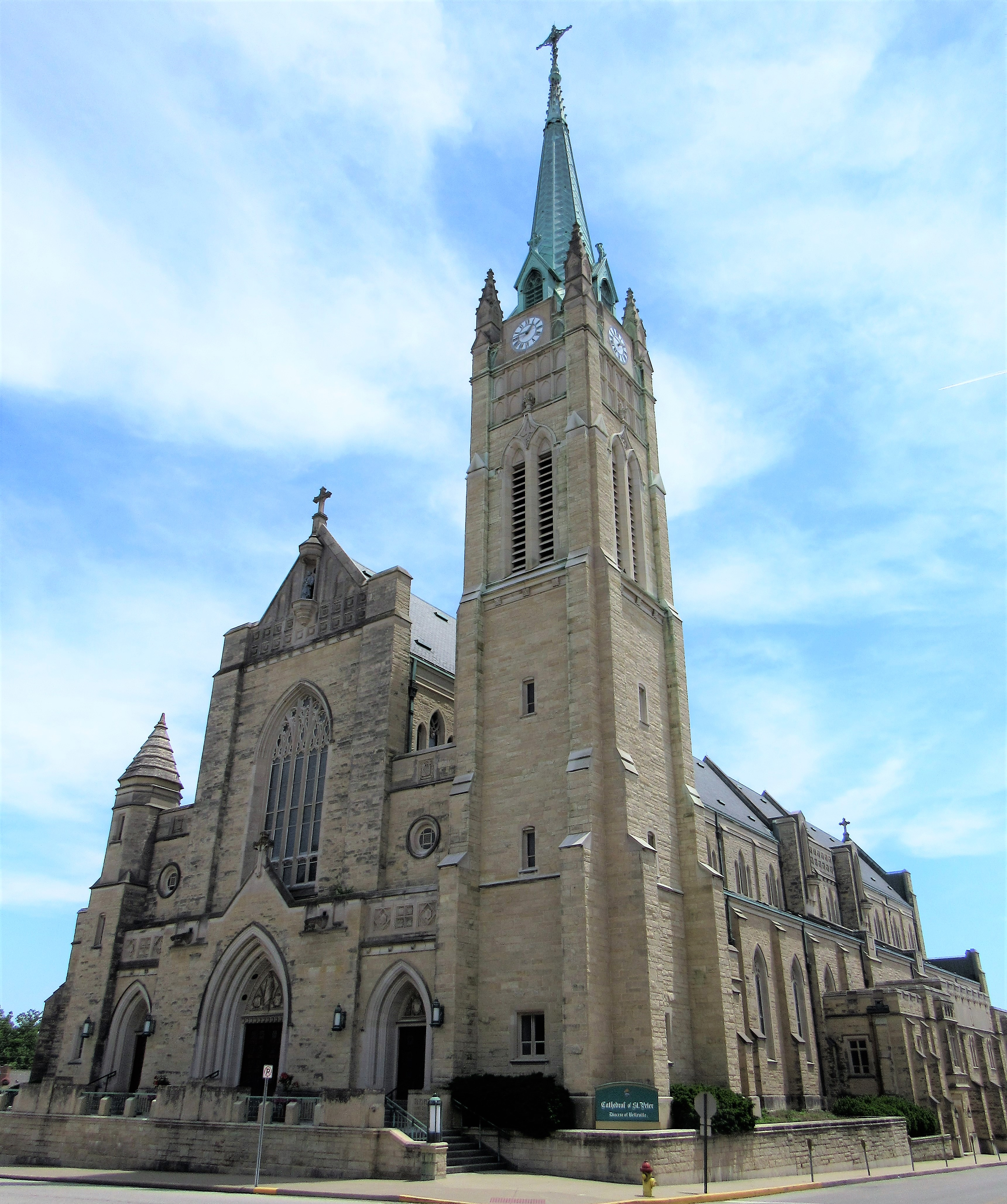
- Cathedral of Saint Peter

- Coat of arms

Location
- Country: United States
- Territory: 28 counties in southern Illinois

Statistics
- Area: 11,678 sq mi (30,250 km^{2})
- Population: Total; Catholics: (as of 2012); 902,000; 118,900 (13.2%)
- Parishes: 101

Information
- Denomination: Catholic
- Sui iuris church: Latin Church
- Rite: Roman Rite
- Established: January 7, 1887 (139 years ago)
- Cathedral: St. Peter's Cathedral
- Patron saint: Immaculate Heart of Mary
- Secular priests: 98 (45 active)

Current leadership
- Pope: Leo XIV
- Bishop: Godfrey Mullen
- Metropolitan Archbishop: Blase J. Cupich
- Bishops emeritus: Edward Braxton

Map
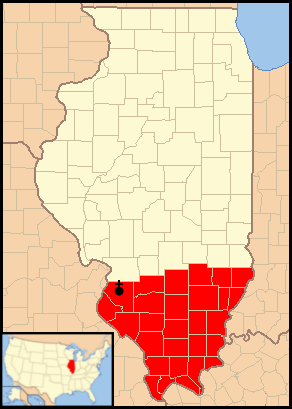

Website
- diobelle.org

The Diocese of Belleville (Latin: Diœcesis Bellevillensis) is a Roman Catholic diocese in the Southern Illinois region of the United States. It is a suffragan see of the Archdiocese of Chicago. The mother church is the Cathedral of Saint Peter in Belleville.

== History ==
=== 1600 to 1700 ===
During the 17th century, the Illinois Country was part of the French colony of New France. The Diocese of Quebec, which had jurisdiction over the colony, sent numerous French missionaries to the region.

According to most sources, the French Jesuit Jacques Marquette was the first missionary in present-day Illinois, building the Immaculate Conception Chapel in Kaskasia in 1675. Some research claims that the Jesuit Claude Allouez spent two months in 1673 in Kaskaskia, performing missionary work.

French missionaries opened the Cahokia mission of Holy Family in 1699. At that time, the Catholics of Cahokia and the surrounding territory, including the city of St. Louis across the river, were attended to by Father De Saintpierre.

An estimated 15,000 to 20,000 Native American converts and French trappers and settlers inhabited ithe region, served by the Jesuit missionaries.

=== 1700 to 1800 ===
The organization of the congregation of Prairie du Rocher, Illinois coincides with the building of the first Fort de Chartres on the Mississippi River in 1720. Jen Le Boullenger, chaplain of the militia stationed at the Fort, was placed in charge of the congregation. The mission church was dedicated to Saint Anne. In 1743, J. Gagnon took charge of the mission, serving there until his death in 1755. A chapel was built in 1734, and dedicated to Saint Joseph.

With the end of the French and Indian War in 1763, the British took control of Illinois.In 1768, Pierre Gibault was appointed vicar general of the Archdiocese of Quebec for the Illinois area.

In 1776, at the start of the American Revolution, the Illinois area was claimed by the new United States. After the American Revolution ended in 1783, Pope Pius VI erected in 1784 the Prefecture Apostolic of the United States, encompassing the entire territory of the new nation. In 1785, the vicar apostolic, John Carroll, sent his first missionary to Illinois. In 1787, the Illinois area became part of the Northwest Territory of the United States. Pius VI created the Diocese of Baltimore, the first diocese in the United States, to replace the prefecture apostolic in 1789.

=== 1800 to 1850 ===
When the Vatican erected the Diocese of Bardstown in Kentucky in 1808, it gained jurisdiction over the Illinois area. St. Patrick's Parish was established by Irish immigrants in Ruma in 1818; its first church was built in 1827. Also in 1818, a French congregation established St. Francis Xavier Parish and built a log cabin church. Six years later in 1824, St. Augustine of Canterbury Parish in Hecker was founded by settlers from England.

In 1827, the Vatican erected the Diocese of St. Louis, giving it jurisdiction over the western half of the new state of Illinois. In 1834, the Vatican erected the Diocese of Vincennes, which included eastern Illinois.

When the Diocese of Chicago was erected in 1843, it included all the Illinois counties from St. Louis and Vincennes.

=== 1850 to 1900 ===
In 1857, Pope Pius IX erected the new Diocese of Alton, transferring all of Southern Illinois from Chicago. The Southern Illinois area would remain part of the Diocese of Alton, for the next 30 years. The first Catholic parish in East St. Louis was St. Patrick's, founded for Irish Catholics in 1861.

In 1875, a contingent of the Hospital Sisters of St. Francis left Münster, Germany, to found St. Elizabeth's Hospital in Belleville. Today it is HSHS St. Elizabeth's Hospital. The Diocese of Belleville was created on January 7, 1887, by Pope Leo XIII. All of its in southern Illinois territory was taken from the Diocese of Alton. The first bishop of the new diocese was John Janssen of Alton, appointed by the pope in 1888. The Sisters of St. Mary of the Third Order of St. Francis opened St. Mary's Infirmary in East St. Louis in 1889.

In 1890, Janssen came into conflict with the parishioners of the Irish St. Patrick's Church. They had refused to accept his appointment of a German pastor and barricaded the church. Janssen then excommuncated all 1,200 members of the parish. Several years later, the Vatican ordered Janssen to lift the excommunications and appoint an Irish pastor. The Franciscan Sisters in 1895 started St. Andrew Hospital in Murphysboro. Today it is SIH St. Joseph Memorial Hospital.

=== 1900 to 1950 ===
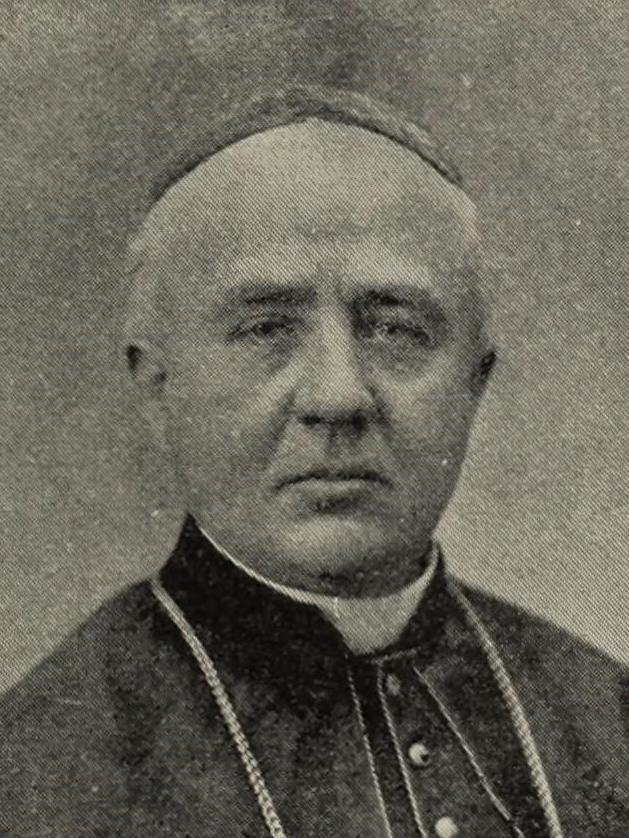
Bishop Janssen (1889)

The first Catholic Parish in Carbondale was St. Francis Xavier, founded in 1900. By 1902, the diocese contained 104 churches, 94 priests, 64 parochial schools and 50,000 Catholics.Janssen died in 1913.

Pope Pius X appointed Henry J. Althoff as bishop of Belleville in 1913 to replace Janssen. In July 1927, Atholl banned female parishioners from receiving communion if they were wearing makeup, sleeveless tops, or low-cut tops.

In 1937, Althoff forbade church-sponsored gambling in the diocese, encouraging Catholics to support their parishes by direct contribution rather than parish parties and festivals. Later that year, he banned dancing the night before a holy day. Since New Year's Day was a holy day, that meant no dancing on New Year's Eve. Althoff died in 1947 after a 20-year tenure as bishop. Pope Pius XII that same year named Albert Zuroweste as the next bishop of Belleville.

=== 1950 to 2000 ===
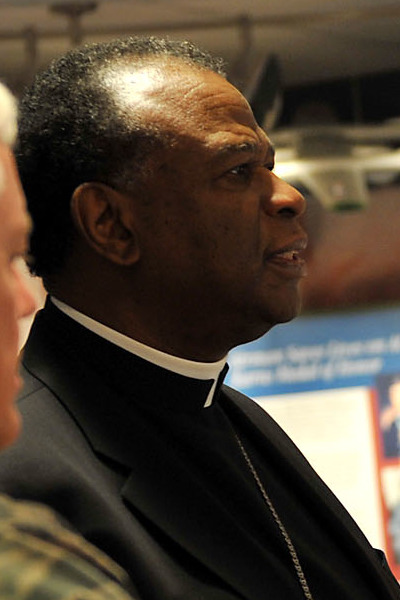
Bishop Braxton (2009)

In 1969, Zuroweste became embroiled in a racial dispute in Cairo, Illinois. He had sent Gerald Montroy to Cairo in 1968 to minister to the poor and to African-Americans. After meeting with the local pastor at St. Patrick Catholic Church, Montroy became convinced that the pastor had no desire to welcome African-Americans to his parish. In response, Montroy reopened St. Columba, a shuttered mission in Cairo previously founded by the Society of African Missions, and started celebrating masses there for African-American Catholics. He also provided facilities for Black Power activists looking to challenge racial discrimination in that city, including Charles Koen and his United Front organization.

When Zuroweste retired in 1977, Pope Paul VI named Auxiliary Bishop William Cosgrove of the Diocese of Cleveland as the next bishop of Belleville. Cosgrove served until his retirement in 1981. His successor, that same year, was John Wurm. Wurm died three years later. John Paul II then appointed James Patrick Keleher of Chicago as the new bishop of Belleville. In 1993, Keleher transferred to become archbishop of Kansas City in Kansas. Auxiliary Bishop Wilton Gregory of Chicago was appointed bishop of Belleville in 1993.

In 1993, Bishop Keleher removed seven priests and one permanent deacon with credible accusations of sexual abuse of minors from ministry.

=== 2000 to present ===
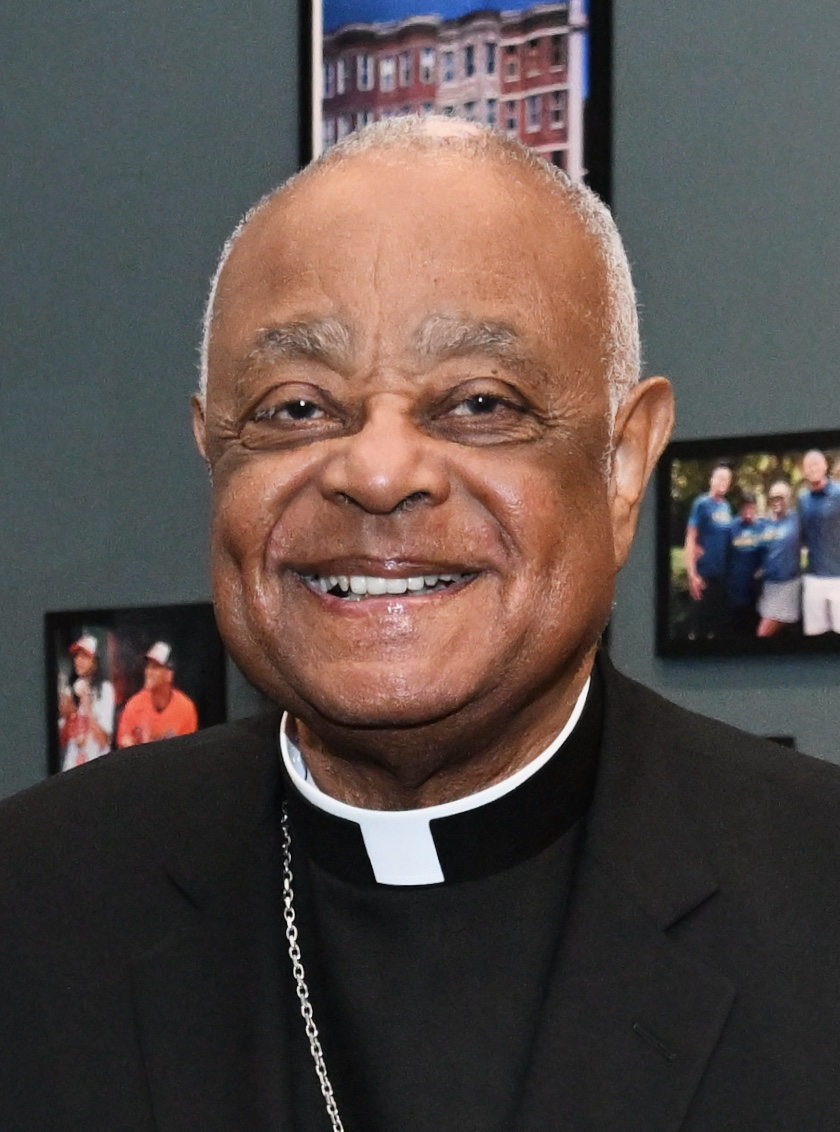
Cardinal Gregory (2024)

In 2004, John Paul II named Gregory as archbishop of the Archdiocese of Atlanta.John Paul II appointed Edward K. Braxton as bishop in 2005. In January 2006, 24 priests in the diocese signed a letter stating that Braxton was not allowing any of their input into decision-making and that he had an arrogant leadership style. On January 24, 2008, Braxton apologized for mishandling diocese funds. He had used $18,000 intended for the Society for the Propagation of the Faith to purchase vestments, altar linens, and office furniture. Braxton said he had mistakenly believed he had discretionary power over these funds. Braxton retired as bishop of Belleville in 2020. A 2008 lawsuit against the diocese revealed Bishop Zuroweste's treatment of a sexual abuse allegation against a priest during the 1970s. In 1973, a parishioner in St. Francisville contacted diocesan officials with the allegation that her parish priest, Raymond Kownacki, had raped and impregnated her. Zuroweste transferred Kownacki to St. Theresa Parish in Salem without any restrictions. By 1982, allegations surfaced that Kownacki was sexually abusing minors at St. Theresa. In 2008, a victim was awarded $2.4 million in compensatory damages and an unexpected $2.6 million in punitive damages. The Vatican laicized Kownacki in 2011.

An Illinois man known as J. Christ sued the diocese for $100,000 in 2014, saying that he was sexually abused in the summers of 1970 and 1971 by Robert J. Vonnahmen at Camp Ondessonk in Ozark. The plaintiff said that Vonnahmen fondled and raped him on many occasions. Removed from ministry in 1993, Vonnahmen was laicized by the Vatican in 2008.

Michael G. McGovern of Chicago was appointed by Pope Francis to succeed Braxton in Belleville in 2020. In July 2022, McGovern announced the planned sale of the diocesan bishop's residence and his move to the Cathedral of St. Peter's rectory. The money from the sale, he announced, would be used for various ministries and charities, including needy pregnant women and children. On May 23, 2023, Illinois Attorney General Kwame Raoul released a report on Catholic clergy child sex abuse in Illinois. The multi-year investigation found that more than 450 Catholic clergy in Illinois abused nearly 2,000 children since 1950.

In March 2025, Francis named McGovern as archbishop of the Archdiocese of Omaha. Pope Leo XVI in March 2026 named Godfrey Mullen of Belleville as McGovern's successor in Belleville.

== Bishops ==
=== Bishops of Belleville ===
1. John Janssen (1887–1913)
2. Henry J. Althoff (1914–1947)
3. Albert Rudolph Zuroweste (1948–1976)
4. William Michael Cosgrove (1976–1981)
5. John Nicholas Wurm (1981–1984)
6. James Patrick Keleher (1984–1993), appointed Archbishop of Kansas City in Kansas
7. Wilton Daniel Gregory (1994–2005), appointed Archbishop of Atlanta
8. Edward Kenneth Braxton (2005–2020)
9. Michael McGovern (2020–2025), appointed Archbishop of Omaha
10. Godfrey Mullen, OSB (2026-present)

=== Auxiliary bishop ===
- Stanley Girard Schlarman (1979-1983), appointed Bishop of Dodge City

=== Other diocesan priest who became bishop ===
- Joseph Henry Leo Schlarman, appointed Bishop of Peoria in 1930 and subsequently named archbishop ad personam

== Education ==
As of 2026, the Diocese of Belleville had three high schools, all of which are in the Greater St. Louis Area, and 23 elementary schools. The uneven distribution of the high schools has led to students from other areas of the diocese along the Indiana or Kentucky borders which are hundreds of miles away from any of the three, choosing to attend high school in neighboring dioceses, such as the Diocese of Evansville or the Diocese of Owensboro instead.

=== High schools ===
- Althoff Catholic – Belleville
- Gibault Catholic High School – Waterloo
- Mater Dei High School – Breese
