= Cathedral of Saint Peter (Belleville, Illinois) =

Catholic cathedral in Illinois, US

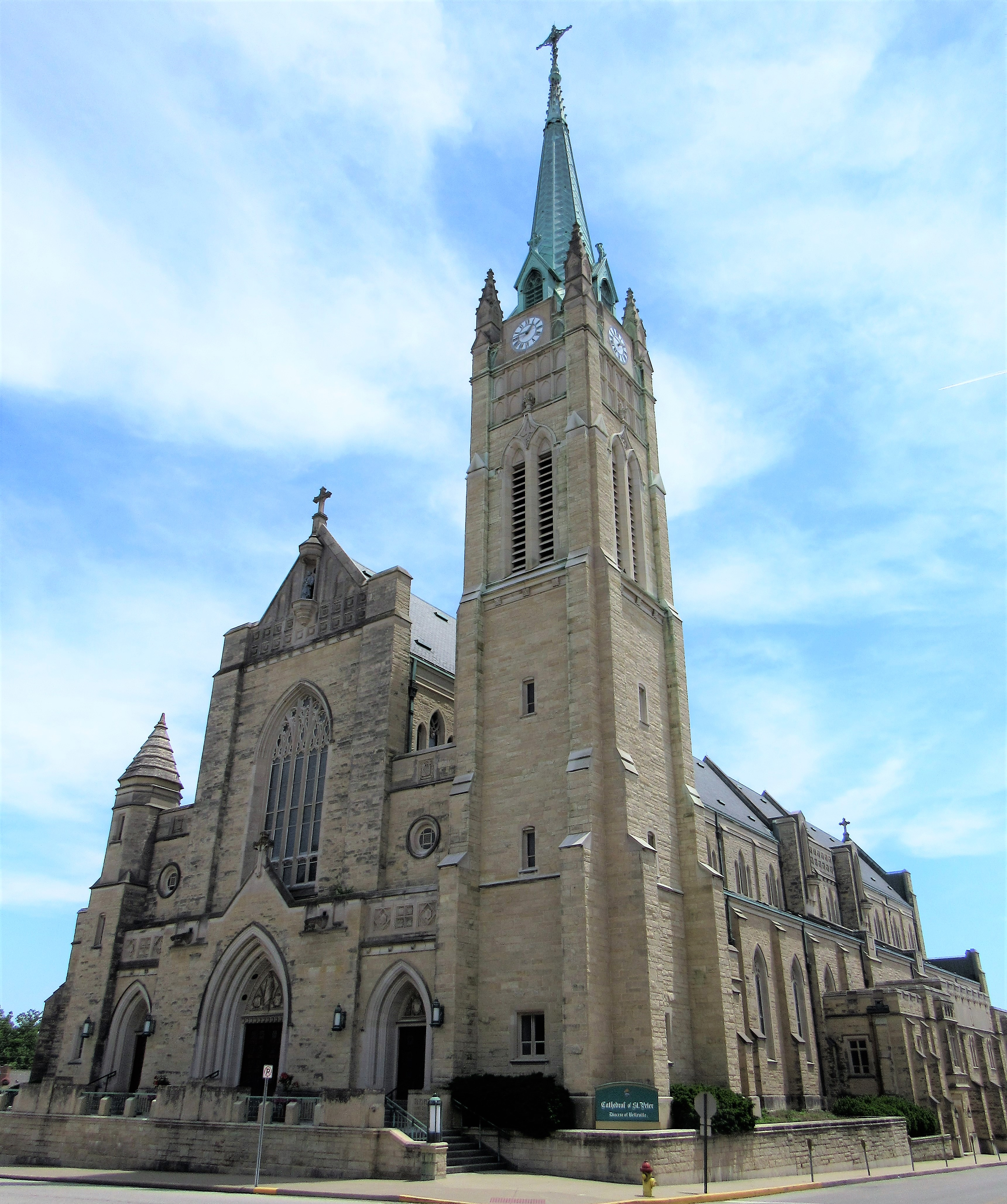

- Location in Illinois
- 38°30′37″N 89°59′17″W
- Location: 200 W. Harrison Street; Belleville, Illinois
- Country: United States
- Denomination: Catholic Church
- Sui iuris church: Latin Church
- Website: cathedralbelle.org

History
- Status: Cathedral
- Founded: 1842

Architecture
- Style: Gothic Revival
- Completed: 1866 (160 years ago)

Specifications
- Capacity: 1,270
- Length: 265 ft (81 m)
- Width: 65 ft (20 m)
- Height: 222 ft (68 m)
- Materials: dolomitic limestone

Administration
- Diocese: Belleville

Clergy
- Bishop: Most Rev. Godfrey Mullen
- Rector: Godfrey Mullen

The Cathedral of Saint Peter is the mother church of the Diocese of Belleville, located in Belleville, Illinois. It is the largest cathedral in the state.

== History ==
=== St. Peter's Church ===
The predecessor to the Cathedral of Saint Peter was Saint Peter Church in Belleville. Originally named St. Barnabas the Apostle, the wood frame structure was constructed in 1842, the first Catholic church in that community. A year later, Belleville became part of the new Diocese of Chicago. In 1847, the church name was changed to Saint Peter. The Vatican in 1853 moved the Bellville area into the new Diocese of Quincy, which a few years later became the Diocese of Alton.

By 1863, the congregation recognized the need for a larger structure. It constructed a brick church on the cathedral's present site, which was dedicated as St. Peter's in 1866. At this time, the congregation was primarily German and masses were celebrated in German and Latin.

=== First Cathedral of Saint Peter ===
In 1887, Pope Leo XIII created the Diocese of Belleville fand named Reverend John Janssen as the first bishop. Janssen designated St. Peter's Church as St. Peter's Cathedral.

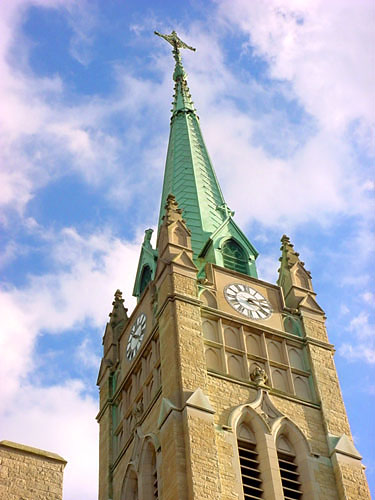
Cathedral spire (2006)

On January 4, 1912, neighborhood children reported a fire in the upper portion of the cathedral. Firefighters were hampered in extinguishing the blaze due to a lack of water pressure to reach the 80 ft (24 m) roof and the 15 °F (−9 °C) temperatures. The fire burned through the roof timbers, which fell and ignited other parts of the structure. After the fire, all that remained of the cathedral were the exterior walls, bell tower and damage pews. A local newspaper estimated the damage at US$100,000 and said that insurance would cover only $40,000 in repairs. The pews were donated to a church in Shiloh, Illinois.

=== Second Cathedral of Saint Peter ===
In building the new cathedral, the diocese incorporated the exterior walls that survived the 1912 fire. Its Gothic architecture was modeled after the Cathedral of Exeter in Exeter, England. The architect Victor Klutho of St. Louis, Missouri. During the construction, a crypt was added to the building.It is the largest cathedral in the state of Illinois.

A second fire in 1937 caused extensive damage inside Saint Peter's on the west side of the nave. The cathedral was temporarily closed for redecoration. By the early 1950s, the mortar joints of the exterior brickwork, damaged by the 1912 fire, needed repair. In 1956, Albert R. Zuroweste resurfaced the exterior brick walls with Winona split-face dolomitic limestone, accented with Indiana limestone.

The diocese in 1966 began a major project to increase the cathedral footprint. Contractors extended the cathedral length, adding a south nave. They also created new sacristies, shrines, and the Blessed Sacrament Chapel. The seating capacity of the building was increased to 1,270. At the same time, the diocese modified the sanctuary to conform to directives of the Second Vatican Council of the early 1960s. The project was completed in 1968.

In 2012, the diocese reinstalled the pulpit and cathedral canopy that had been removed during the 1966 project. The diocese in 2015 displayed the body of Maria Goretti at the cathedral. An Italian saint, she was martyred at age 11 in 1902 in while resisting a sexual assault. Thousands of people lined up to view her remains.

== Cathedral interior ==
The cathedral houses a three-manual, 40-rank organ by the M. P. Moller Company that dates from 1968. A second console has been added along with four ranks of pipes.

== See also ==
- List of Catholic cathedrals in the United States
- List of cathedrals in the United States
