= Sexual abuse scandal in the Roman Catholic Diocese of Peoria =

The sexual abuse scandal in the Peoria diocese is the part of the Catholic sex abuse cases affecting the Roman Catholic Diocese of Peoria in the U.S. state of Illinois.

In May 2023, Illinois Attorney General Kwame Raoul released an investigative report about sexual abuse of minors by Catholic clergy in Illinois. For the Diocese of Peoria, Raoul reported 51 priests with credible accusations of sexual abuse by 142 accusers.

== Allegations against Bishop Myers ==
From 1987 to 2001, John J. Myers was Coadjutor Bishop then Bishop of Peoria. Soon after being reassigned from Peoria to Newark, Myers was appointed to the United States Conference of Catholic Bishops' Ad Hoc Committee on Sexual Abuse, to investigate the Catholic sex abuse cases. The affairs involving John Anderson and Francis Engels had reportedly occurred under his watch.

In 2002, Myers was among the two-thirds of sitting bishops and acting diocese administrators that the Dallas Morning News found had allowed priests accused of sexual abuse to continue working.

== John Anderson ==
John Anderson was first accused in 1993, and was removed from a parish; by 2002, Anderson was the director of the Peoria diocese office for Propagation of the Faith, until he and six other priests were suspended that May by Myers' successor, Bishop Daniel R. Jenky.

== Francis Engels ==
Francis Engels was the subject of numerous complaints, but accusers say the bishop ignored them until the accusers went to the news media in the early 1990s. Myers suspended Engels, but later attempted to re-instate him. Myers later said that he "didn't realize they would be so upset" about re-instatement. In 2005, Engels pleaded guilty (in an Alford plea) to molesting a Peoria altar boy on trips to Milwaukee in the early 1980s; the victim said Engels told him, "If you tell anybody, they're not going to believe you". When the Ad Hoc Committee on Sexual Abuse was reorganized in May 2002, Myers was one of three bishops no longer on the committee.

Engels died in Kewanee, Illinois on June 6, 2019.
