= Diocese of Peoria =

Latin Catholic ecclesiastical jurisdiction in Illinois, United States

Diocese of Peoria Diœcesis Peoriensis
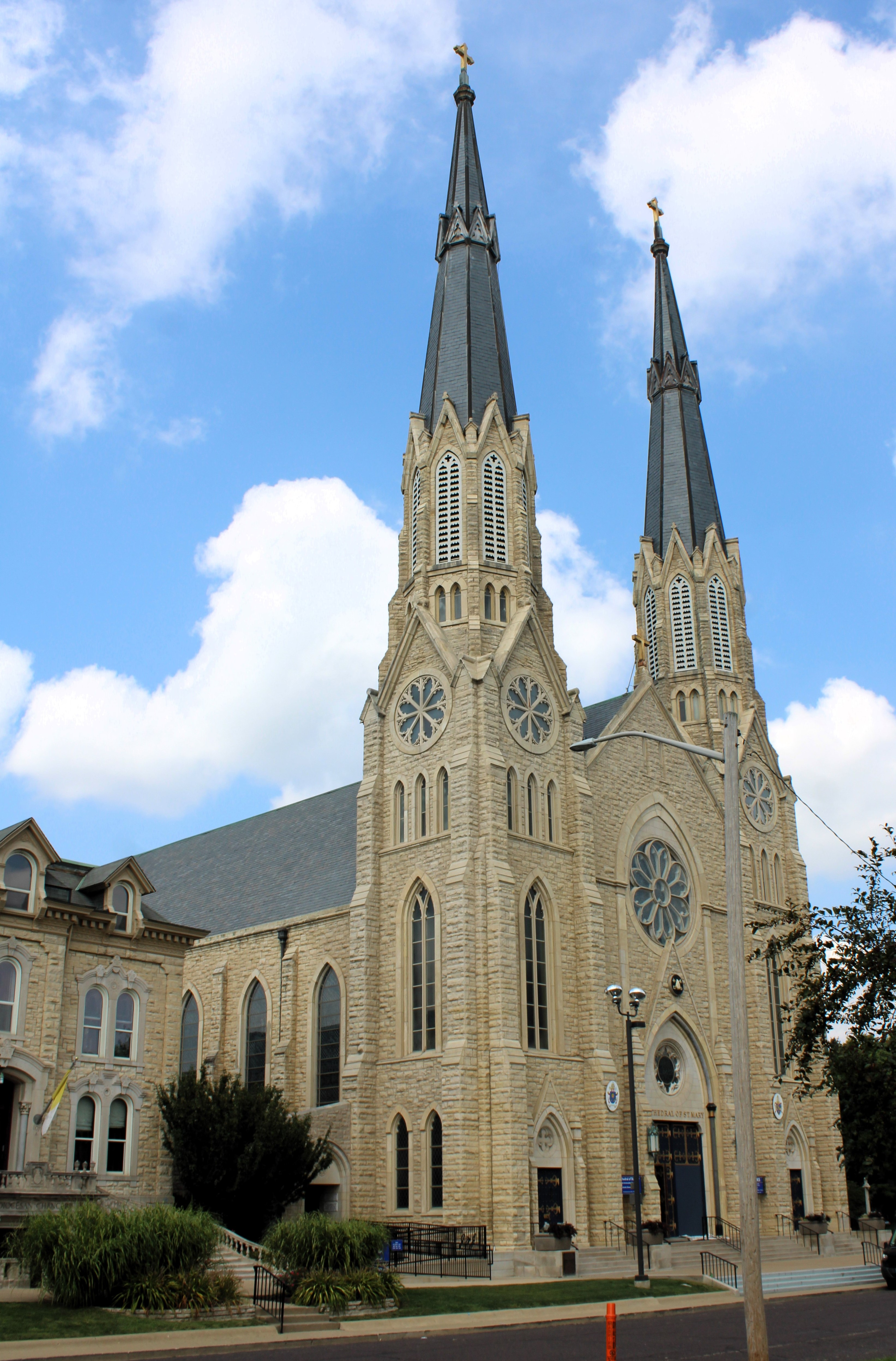
- Cathedral of St. Mary of the Immaculate Conception

- Coat of arms

Location
- Country: United States
- Territory: 26 counties across central Illinois
- Ecclesiastical province: Chicago
- Metropolitan: Chicago

Statistics
- Area: 16,933 sq mi (43,860 km^{2})
- Population: Total; Catholics: (as of 2015); 1,492,335; 121,965 (8.2%)
- Parishes: 158

Information
- Denomination: Catholic
- Sui iuris church: Latin Church
- Rite: Roman Rite
- Established: February 12, 1875 (151 years ago)
- Cathedral: St. Mary's Cathedral
- Patron saint: Immaculate Conception; St. Joseph the Worker; St. Therese of Lisieux

Current leadership
- Pope: Leo XIV
- Bishop: Louis Tylka
- Metropolitan Archbishop: Blase J. Cupich
- Vicar General: Philip D. Halfacre
- Bishops emeritus: Daniel R. Jenky

Map
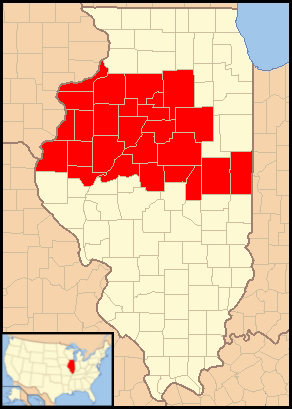

Website
- cdop.org

The Diocese of Peoria (Latin: Diœcesis Peoriensis) is a diocese of the Catholic Church in the north central region of Illinois in the United States. It is a suffragan diocese of the metropolitan Archdiocese of Chicago. The bishop is Louis Tylka. The mother church of the diocese is the Cathedral of St. Mary of the Immaculate Conception in Peoria.

== History ==
=== Early history ===
==== 1670 to 1776 ====
During the 17th century, present-day Illinois was part of the French colony of New France. The Diocese of Quebec, which had jurisdiction over the colony, sent numerous French missionaries to the region.

The French explorers Robert de La Salle and Henri de Tonti in January 1680 built Fort Crèvecoeur near present-day Creve Coeur, Illinois. Mass was celebrated there by three Recollect Fathers: Gabriel Ribourdi, Zenobius Membre, and Louis Hennepin. In 1698, the Jesuit Gabriel Marest was sent by the Diocese of Quebec to minister to the Native American settlement on Peoria Lake, a section of the Mississippi River. Fearing attack from hostile tribes, Marest and the Peoria Lake group later migrated further south along the river. With the end of the French and Indian War in 1763, Great Britain took possession of Illinois and the other French colonies east of the Mississippi River. The French priests then closed their missions in the Mississippi Valley.

==== 1776 to 1875 ====
In 1776, the new United States claimed sovereignty over the area of Illinois. After the American Revolution ended in 1783, Pope Pius VI erected in 1784 the Prefecture Apostolic of the United States, encompassing the entire territory of the new nation. In 1785, Bishop John Carroll sent his first missionary to Illinois. In 1787, the area became part of the Northwest Territory of the United States. Pius VI created the Diocese of Baltimore, the first diocese in the United States, to replace the prefecture apostolic in 1789.

With the creation of the Diocese of Bardstown in Kentucky in 1810, supervision of the Illinois missions shifted there from the Diocese of Baltimore. In 1827, the Diocese of St. Louis assumed jurisdiction over the western half of the new state of Illinois. In 1834, the Vatican erected the Diocese of Vincennes, which included eastern Illinois. Bishop Joseph Rosati of St. Louis sent John Blaise Raho in 1839 to serve the growing Catholic population of central Illinois. He erected St. Patrick's Church in Kickapoo.

In 1843, the Vatican erected the Diocese of Chicago, taking all the Illinois parishes from the Dioceses of St. Louis and Vincennes. St. Mary's, the first Catholic church in Peoria proper, was erected by John A. Drew in 1846. Among his successors as pastor of St. Mary's was the poet Abram J. Ryan.

Many of the early Irish immigrants in Illinois in the mid-1800s came to work on the Illinois and Michigan Canal. Owing to the failure of the contracting company, the workers received their pay in land scrip instead of cash, forcing them to settle on virgin farm land. These Irish farmers joined the existing German immigrants. They were followed by Poles, Slovaks, Slovenians, Croats, Lithuanians, and Italians who came to work in the coal mines. These groups were organized in ethnic parishes with priests of their own nationalities. In 1851, the first Catholic Church in Rock Island, St. James, was opened.

=== Diocese of Peoria ===
==== 1875 to 1930 ====
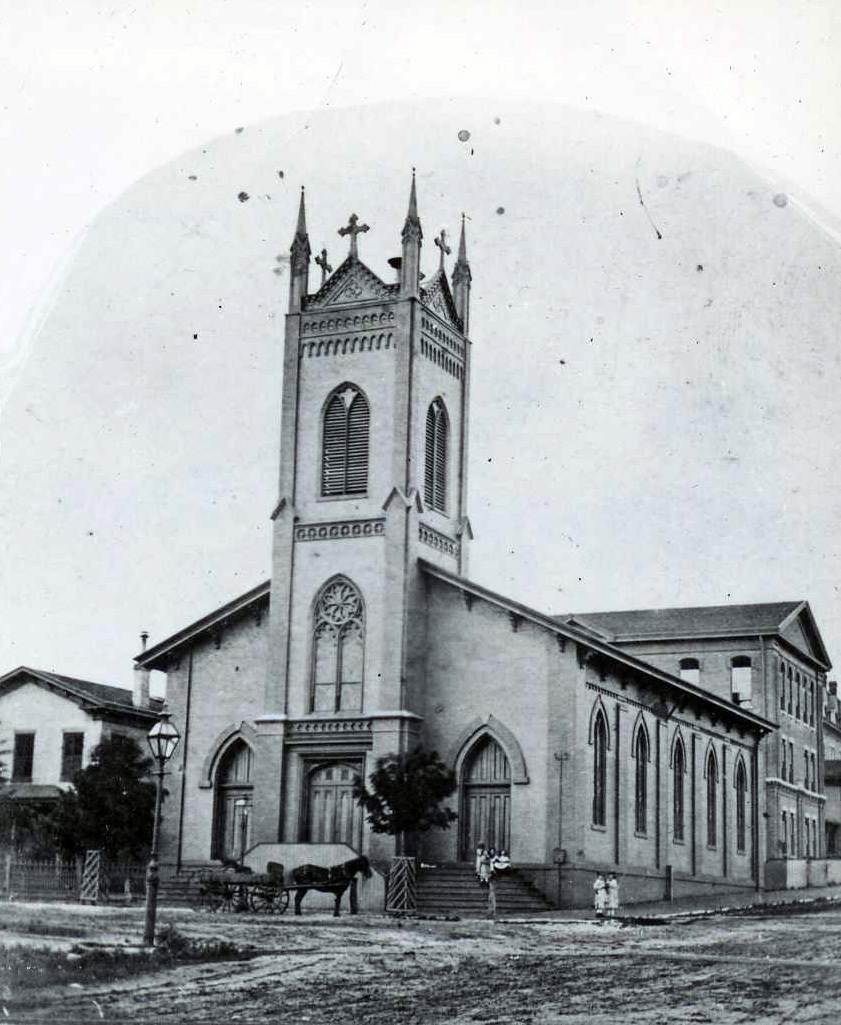
The first St. Mary's Cathedral (1858)

Due to the rapid growth of the Catholic population in central Illinois in the late 19th century, Coadjutor Bishop Thomas Foley of Chicago became concerned about his ability to govern that region along with Chicago. He requested that the Vatican divide the Diocese of Chicago in 1872, but the Vatican did not act on it. After another appeal to the Vatican in 1874, Pope Pius IX on February 12, 1875, erected the new Diocese of Peoria, taking 23 counties from the Diocese of Chicago. The new diocese was bounded on the west by the Mississippi River and on the east by the Indiana border. Peoria was chosen as the see city.

Pius IX appointed John Spalding of the Diocese of Louisville as the first bishop of Peoria in 1876. That same year, six Sisters of the Third Order of St. Francis arrived from Iowa City, Iowa, to care for the sick. They served at the city hospital and made home visits to patients. Shortly after the nuns' arrival, Spalding visited the city hospital. Observing their difficult working conditions, he encouraged them to form a separate congregation with his support. The Sisters of the Third Order of St. Francis of Peoria was established in July 1877. St. Francis Hospital opened in Peoria 1878. Stricken with paralysis in 1905, Spalding resigned as bishop in 1908.

Edmund Dunne of Chicago was the second bishop of Peoria, named by Pope Pius X in 1909. During the early 1920s, the future Archbishop Fulton Sheen, a popular Catholic personality in the post-war period, was a priest in the diocese. After Sheen spent time in pastoral and teaching jobs in the United Kingdom, Dunne ordered him to return to Peoria in 1925. This was despite Sheen's receiving job offers from Columbia University and Oxford University. After a year as a curate, Dunn allowed Sheen to take a position at Catholic University in Washington, DC.

==== 1930 to 1990 ====
After Dunn died in 1929, Pope Pius XI replaced him in 1930 with Joseph Schlarman from the Diocese of Belleville. In 1951, he died after 20 years as bishop of Peoria. Auxiliary Bishop William Cousins of Chicago was the next bishop of the diocese, named by Pope Pius XII in 1952. During his tenure as bishop, Cousins established five new parishes and six new grade schools. Pope John XXIII named Cousins as archbishop of the Archdiocese of Milwaukee in 1958.

To replace Cousins, Pope John XXIII appointed Bishop John Franz from the Diocese of Dodge City in 1959. Franz led initiatives to create 17 new grade schools, two new high schools, one Newman Center, four new parishes, four missions, and elevate eight missions to parish status. He retired in 1971 and Pope Paul VI named Edward O'Rourke of Peoria to replace Franz.

O'Rourke sold the episcopal residence on Glen Oak Avenue in Peoria and moved to a one-bedroom brick ranch house near St. Mary's Cathedral, donating the money to the diocesan fund for retired priests. He established the first diocesan pastoral council in 1974. That same year he replaced the old system of six deaneries by dividing the diocese into fifteen vicariates. He ordained the first permanent deacons of the diocese in 1976.

O'Rourke established the Annual Stewardship Appeal (now known as the Annual Diocesan Appeal) and the Teens Encounter Christ program. He consolidated Costa Catholic School in Galesburg, Illinois, (1972), Jordan Catholic School in Rock Island, (1974), La Salle Catholic School (1978) and Peoria Notre Dame High School (1988). In 1987, Pope John Paul II appointed John J. Myers of Peoria as coadjutor bishop of that diocese to assist O'Rourke.

==== 1990 to present ====
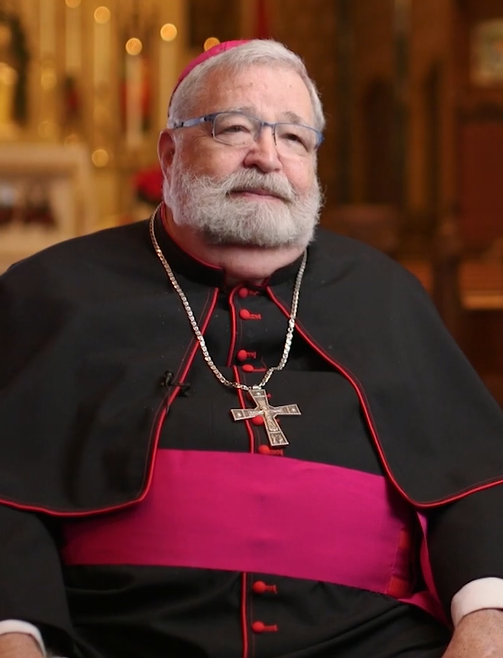
Bishop Jenky (2019)

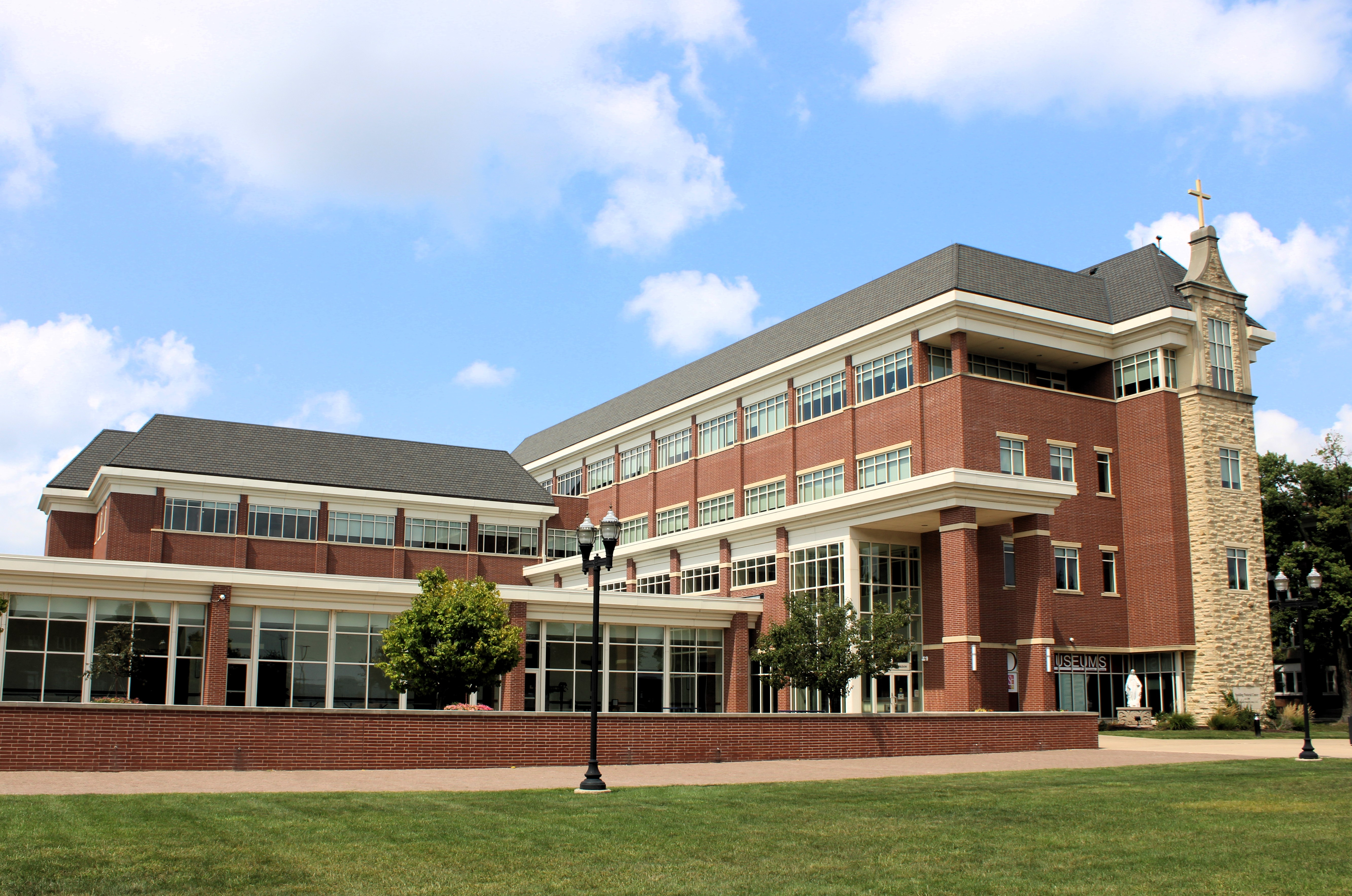
Spalding Pastoral Center in Peoria (2023)

When O'Rourke retired in 1990 after 19 years as bishop, Myers succeeded him. Myers issued an order forbidding Catholic hospitals in the diocese from providing emergency contraception to rape victims, a restriction he later eased. He also fired a teacher at a Catholic high school for inviting a speaker to discuss the ordination of women to the priesthood. During Myers' tenure, the diocese saw a rapid increase in vocations to the priesthood. In 2001, Myers was made archbishop of Newark. Auxiliary Bishop Daniel R. Jenky of the Diocese of Fort Wayne-South Bend was appointed by Pope John Paul II in 2002 to succeed Myers in Peoria.

In 2008, the diocese opened the Fulton J. Sheen Museum in the Spalding Pastoral Center in Peoria. As bishop, Jenky led the canonization cause of Sheen. However, in 2014, citing undocumented verbal agreements, Jenky announced that he would not permit the cause to progress until the Archdiocese of New York transferred Sheen's remains to Peoria from St. Patrick's Cathedral in New York City. After three years of litigation between the diocese and the archdiocese regarding Sheen's wishes, a court ordered his remains to go to Peoria, where they arrived in June 2019.

In November 2018, the diocese removed three retired priests, George Hiland, Duane Leclercq, and John Onderko, from public ministry after determining that all three had been credibly accused of sexual abuse of minors.

On May 11, 2020, Pope Francis named Louis Tylka of the Archdiocese of Chicago as coadjutor bishop of the diocese. When Jenky retired in 2022, Tylka became bishop of Peoria. In May 2023, Illinois Attorney General Kwame Raoul released an investigative report about sexual abuse of minors by Catholic clergy in Illinois. For the Diocese of Peoria, Raoul reported 51 priests with credible accusations of sexual abuse by 142 accusers. The diocese said that none of these priests were still in ministry and all of them had been reported to authorities. In May 2024, Tylka announced a reorganization plan for the diocese. Under the plan, 12 parishes would merge with their neighbors and 107 parishes would merge into 38 new parishes. He cited the shortage of priests and the declining Catholic population in the region for these moves.

== Bishops ==
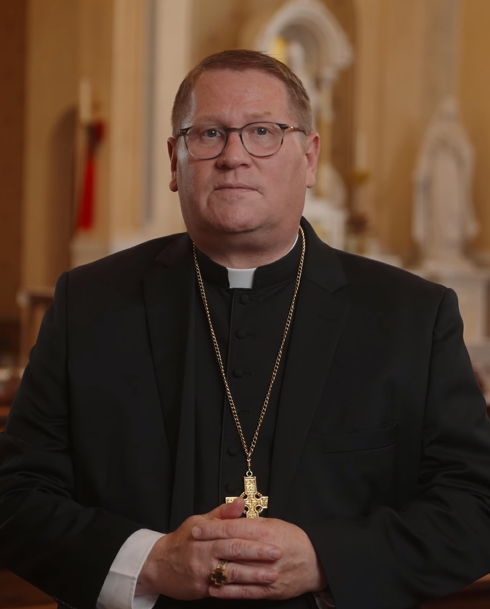
Bishop Tylka (2022)

=== Bishops of Peoria ===
1. John Lancaster Spalding (1876–1908)
2. Edmund Michael Dunne (1909–1929)
3. Joseph Henry Leo Schlarman (1930–1951), appointed archbishop ad personam in 1951
4. William Edward Cousins (1952–1958), appointed Archbishop of Milwaukee
5. John Baptist Franz (1959–1971)
6. Edward William O'Rourke (1971–1990)
7. John Joseph Myers (1990–2001; coadjutor 1987–1990), appointed Archbishop of Newark
8. Daniel Robert Jenky (2002–2022)
9. Louis Tylka (2022–Present; coadjutor 2020–2022)

=== Auxiliary bishops ===
Peter Joseph O'Reilly (1900-1923)

=== Other diocesan priests who became bishops ===
- Gerald Thomas Bergan, appointed Bishop of Des Moines and later Archbishop of Omaha
- Fulton J. Sheen, appointed Auxiliary Bishop of New York and later Bishop of Rochester, and elevated to Archbishop (Titular Archbishop of the historic Archdiocese of Newport in Wales) upon retirement in 1969

== The Catholic Post ==
In 1934, the diocese established a newspaper called The Peoria Register. It originally was part of a chain of diocesan newspapers printed in Denver. In 1969, the name was changed to The Catholic Post. The Post published its final edition on Dec. 24, 2023.

== Education ==
As of 2026, the Diocese of Peoria had seven high schools and 32 elementary/middle schools.

=== High schools ===
- Central Catholic High School – Bloomington
- The High School of St. Thomas More – Champaign
- Schlarman Academy – Danville
- Marquette Academy – Ottawa
- Notre Dame High School – Peoria
- St. Bede Academy – Peru
- Alleman Catholic High School – Rock Island

== Sources ==
- catholic-hierarchy
