= John Franz =

John Franz may refer to:

- John E. Franz (born 1929), American organic chemist
- John Baptist Franz (1896–1992), American Roman Catholic bishop
- Johnny Franz (1922–1977), English record producer
