= Edward William O'Rourke =

His Excellency, The Most Reverend Edward William O'Rourke
- Bishop of Peoria
- See: Diocese of Peoria
- Installed: May 24, 1971
- Term ended: January 22, 1990
- Predecessor: John Baptist Franz
- Successor: John J. Myers
- Other posts: Executive Director, National Catholic Rural Life Conference (1960 to 1971)

Orders
- Ordination: May 28, 1944 by Joseph Henry Leo Schlarman
- Consecration: July 15, 1971 by John Cody

Personal details
- Born: October 31, 1917 Downs, Illinois, US
- Died: September 29, 1999 (aged 81) Peoria, Illinois, US
- Denomination: Roman Catholic Church
- Education: St. Mary of the Lake Seminary
- Motto: To lead by serving

Edward William O'Rourke (October 31, 1917 – September 29, 1999) was an American prelate of the Roman Catholic Church. He served as the sixth bishop of the Diocese of Peoria in Illinois from 1971 to 1990.

== Biography ==
=== Early life ===
One of eleven children, Edward O'Rourke was born on October 31, 1917, in Downs, Illinois, to Martin and Mary (née Hickey) O'Rourke. He decided to become a priest following his confirmation in 1930, and later recalled he "never had a moment of doubt that this was [his] calling." After attending Downs High School (1931–1935) and St. Henry College (1935–1938), he studied at St. Mary of the Lake Seminary in Mundelein, Illinois.

=== Priesthood ===
Edward O'Rourke was ordained to the priesthood for the Diocese of Peoria at St. Mary's Cathedral in Peoria, Illinois, by Bishop Joseph H. Schlarman on May 28, 1944. He then served as an assistant chaplain at the Newman Centre of the University of Illinois at Urbana-Champaign until 1960. During the 1950s, he also helped find housing and employment for hundreds of refugees fleeing Communist regimes in Eastern Europe.

From 1960 to 1971, O'Rourke served as executive director of the National Catholic Rural Life Conference. He helped establish hundreds of economic development committees, cooperatives and other self-help programs in the United States and abroad. During the 1960s, he lectured widely on his experiences in developing countries, traveling more than 140,000 miles to 19 nations in one year alone.

=== Bishop of Peoria ===
On May 24, 1971, O'Rourke was appointed bishop of Peoria by Pope Paul VI. He received his episcopal consecration at St. Mary's Cathedral on July 15, 1971, from Cardinal John Cody, with Bishops John Franz and George Speltz serving as co-consecrators. Later that year, O'Rourke sold the episcopal residence on Glen Oak Avenue in Peoria and moved to a one-bedroom brick ranch house near St. Mary's Cathedral, donating the money to the diocesan fund for retired priests. He established the first diocesan pastoral council in 1974. That same year he established he replaced the old system of six deaneries by dividing the diocese into fifteen vicariates. He ordained the first permanent deacons of the diocese in 1976.

In September 1976, O'Rourke was aboard TWA Flight 355 from New York City to Chicago when it was hijacked by Croatian separatists. The hijackers offered him a chance to leave the plane, but he declined. While being held captive, O'Rourke led the passengers in prayer and tried to persuade the hijackers to surrender.The hijacking ended in Paris, France, without any casualties.

During his tenure, O'Rourke established the Annual Stewardship Appeal (now known as the Annual Diocesan Appeal) and the Teens Encounter Christ program. He consolidated Costa Catholic School in Galesburg, Illinois, (1972), Jordan Catholic School in Rock Island, Illinois, (1974), La Salle Catholic School (1978) and Peoria Notre Dame High School (1988). He suffered from a number of health problems; he underwent hip replacement surgery, suffered a stroke in 1985, and was forced to use a pacemaker.

=== Retirement and legacy ===
On January 22, 1990, Pope John Paul II accepted O'Rourke's resignation as bishop of Peoria. A few months after his retirement, he founded Renaissance Stand, an organization designed to help the long-term unemployed obtain jobs and job training.

Edward O'Rourke died in Peoria on September 29, 1999, at age 81. He is buried in the Bishop's Mausoleum at St. Mary's Cemetery in Peoria.

== Viewpoints ==
=== Poverty ===
O'Rourke was a strong supporter of self-help projects to aid the poor over handouts. He favored private aid over governmental aid because he believed it was too dependent on the political party in power.

=== Rural life ===
In 1960, O'Rourke declared,

"We must not exchange the family farm system for a few 'general farms incorporated.' Such an exchange would be tragic for families on the land and for nations as a whole. In America we have an agriculture which is efficient, which is conducive to good family life, which is a bulwark of religion and democracy. Let us not exchange it for a type of agriculture which has failed in every place and every age in which it has been tried."

In 1967, O'Rourke issued a critique of industrial agriculture, saying,

"It neglects entirely the spiritual, social and cultural values of rural living. It means the uprooting of thousands of rural families...The spiritual, social and cultural values of the farm family and given priority in determining our agricultural priorities."

Catholic Church titles
Preceded by John Baptist Franz	Bishop of Peoria; 1971—1990	Succeeded by John J. Myers
