= Santa Maria delle Grazie a Via Trionfale =

St. Mary of Graces in via Trionfale
- Santa Maria delle Grazie a via Trionfale (in Italian); S. Mariæ Gratiarum ad viam triumphalem (in Latin)
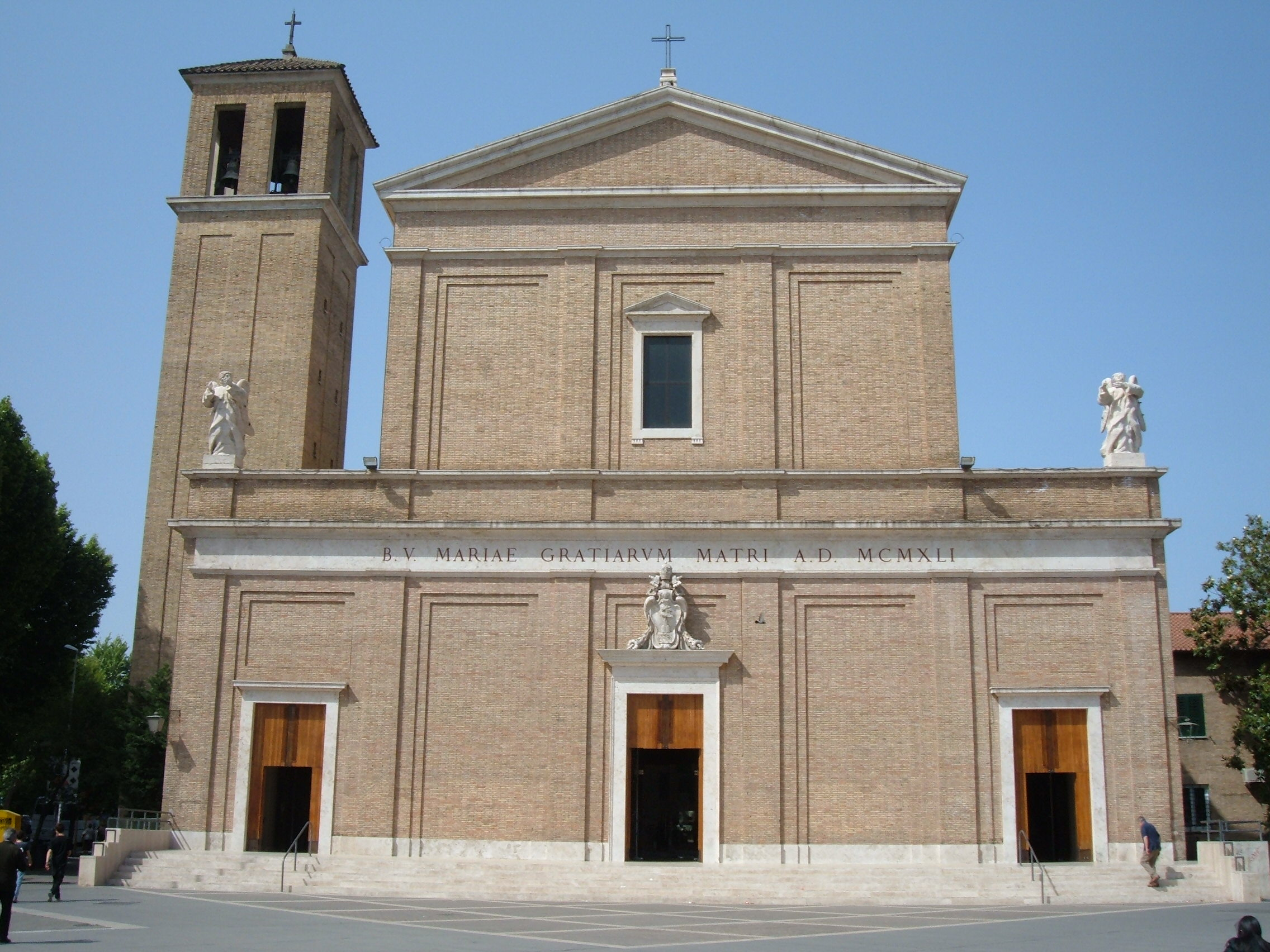
- Facade
- Click on the map for a fullscreen view
- 41°54′26″N 12°26′56″E
- Location: Piazza Santa Maria delle Grazie 5, Rome
- Country: Italy
- Denomination: Roman Catholic
- Tradition: Roman Rite
- Website: Official website

History
- Status: Titular church
- Dedication: Mary, mother of Jesus (as Our Lady of Graces)
- Consecrated: 1941

Architecture
- Architect: Tullio Rossi
- Architectural type: Church
- Groundbreaking: 1940
- Completed: 1941

Administration
- District: Lazio
- Province: Rome

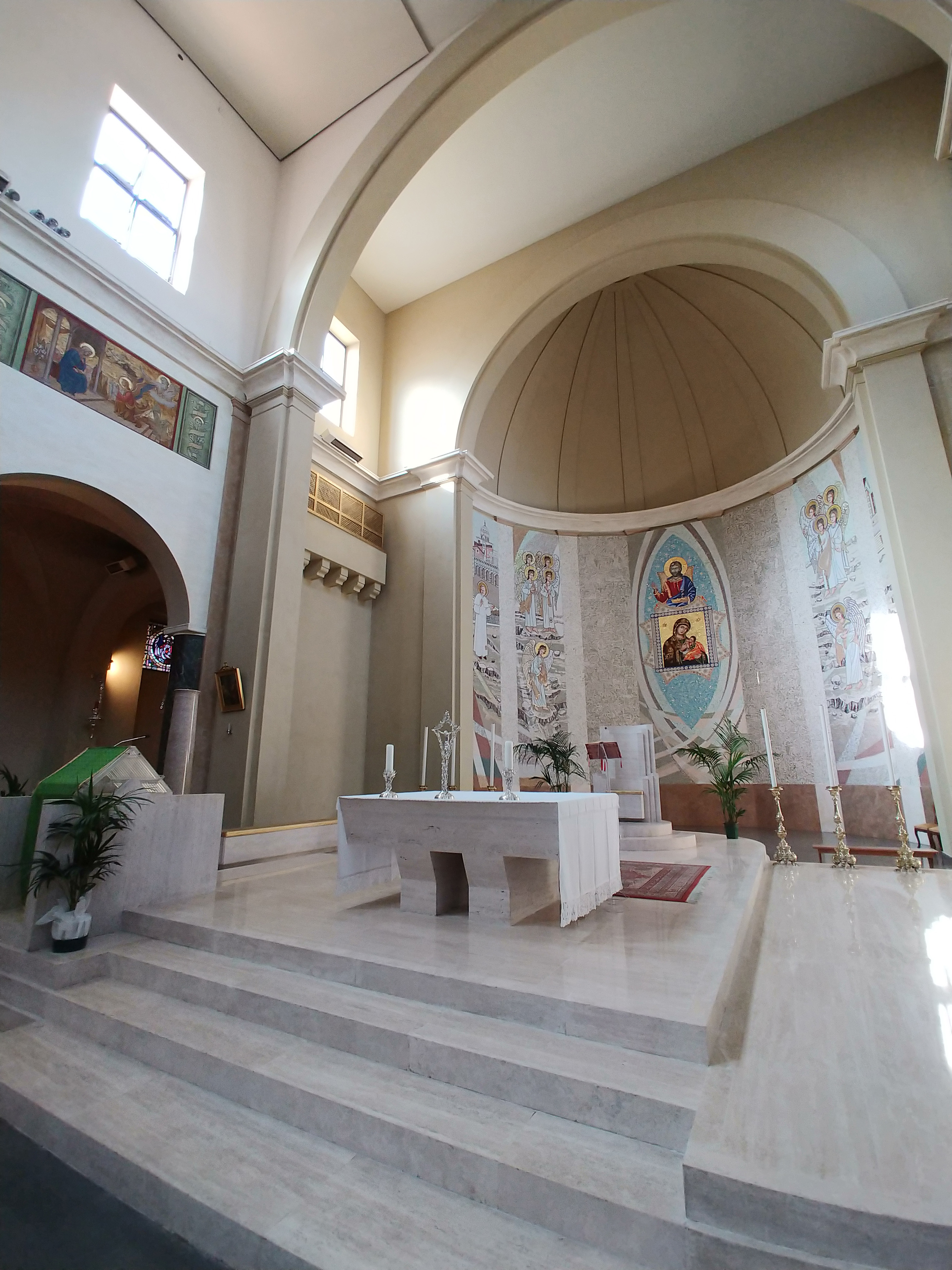
Apse

The church of Santa Maria delle Grazie al Trionfale is a church in Rome, in the Trionfale district, in Piazza Santa Maria delle Grazie.

== History ==
The church was built by the architect and engineer Tullio Rossi in the early forties; it is home parish, erected August 13, 1941 by the decree of the Cardinal Vicar Francesco Marchetti Selvaggiani "Beatissimae Virginis gratiarum", and he inherited the title of Santa Maria delle Grazie outside Porta Angelica, demolished in 1939 for the restructuring of Via di Porta Angelica.

== List of Cardinal Priests ==
- Silvano Piovanelli 25 May 1985 - 9 July 2016
- Joseph William Tobin 19 November 2016 – present
