= Louis Tylka =

American Catholic prelate (born 1970)

His Excellency, The Most Reverend Louis Tylka
- Bishop of Peoria
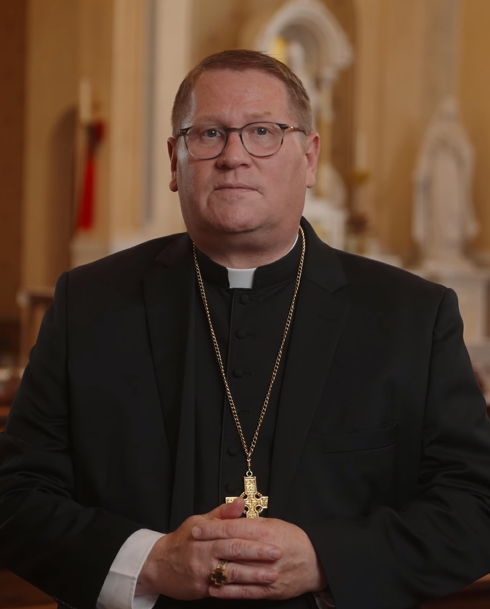
- Bishop Tylka in 2022
- Diocese: Peoria
- Appointed: May 11, 2020 (as Coadjutor)
- Installed: March 3, 2022
- Predecessor: Daniel R. Jenky
- Previous post: Coadjutor Bishop of Peoria (2020-2022)

Orders
- Ordination: May 18, 1996 by Joseph Bernardin
- Consecration: July 23, 2020 by Blase Joseph Cupich, Jerome E. Listecki, Christophe Pierre

Personal details
- Born: May 26, 1970 (age 56) Harvey, Illinois, US
- Education: Purdue University; Saint Joseph College Seminary; University of Saint Mary of the Lake
- Motto: Go make disciples
- Styles
- Reference style: His Excellency; The Most Reverend
- Spoken style: Your Excellency
- Religious style: Bishop

Louis Tylka (born May 26, 1970) is an American Catholic prelate serving as Bishop of Peoria in Illinois since 2022, after 19 months as coadjutor bishop there.

== Biography ==
=== Early life ===
Tylka was born on May 26, 1970, in Harvey, Illinois, to Louis and Norma Tylka. He has five older sisters. The family moved to Hazel Crest, Illinois. Tylka was educated at St. Joseph Grammar School in Homewood, Illinois, and Marian Catholic High School in Chicago Heights, Illinois.

After a year at Purdue University in West Lafayette, Indiana, Tylka decided to enter the priesthood. He transferred in 1989 to Niles College Seminary of Loyola University Chicago, receiving a Bachelor of Arts degree in 1992. He then studied for the priesthood at University of Saint Mary of the Lake in Mundelein, Illinois, receiving a Bachelor of Sacred Theology degree in 1995 and a Master of Divinity degree in 1996.

=== Priesthood ===
On May 18, 1996, Tylka was ordained a priest for the Archdiocese of Chicago by Cardinal Joseph Bernardin at Holy Name Cathedral in Chicago.

After his ordination in 1996, the archdiocese assigned Tylka as associate pastor at St. Michael Parish in Orland Park, Illinois. In 2003, he was transferred to Saints Faith, Hope, and Charity Parish in Winnetka, Illinois to serve the same role. Tylka was appointed pastor of St. Paul VI Parish in North Riverside, Illinois in 2004, remaining there for the next 10 years. In 2014, the archdiocese appointed him as pastor of St. Julie Billiart Parish in Tinley Park, Illinois. Tylka served on the priests council for the archdiocese and in 2015 Cardinal Blase Cupich appointed him as its chair.

=== Coadjutor Bishop and Bishop of Peoria ===
Pope Francis appointed Tylka as coadjutor bishop for the Diocese of Peoria on May 11, 2020. Peoria's Bishop Daniel Jenky had asked for the appointment of a coadjutor because of health problems. Tylka was consecrated at the Cathedral of Saint Mary of the Immaculate Conception in Peoria by Cardinal Blase Cupich on July 23, 2020, with Archbishops Christophe Pierre and Jerome Listecki serving as co-consecrators. (Note: Listecki replaced Jenky, who had placed himself in self-quarantine following exposure to the COVID-19 virus.)

On August 25, 2021, Tylka said that Archbishop Fulton J. Sheen, who served as a priest in Peoria, should be canonized (made a saint). Sheen was due to be beatified in 2019, but Bishop Salvatore Matano had requested a pause in the process.

When Jenky's retirement was accepted by Pope Francis on March 3, 2022, Tylka automatically became the new bishop of the Diocese of Peoria.

== See also ==
- Catholic Church hierarchy
- Catholic Church in the United States
- Historical list of the Catholic bishops of the United States
- List of Catholic bishops of the United States
- Lists of patriarchs, archbishops, and bishops

== Notes ==
Catholic Church titles
Preceded by -	Coadjutor Bishop of Peoria; 2020–2022	Succeeded by -
Preceded by Daniel R. Jenky	Bishop of Peoria; 2022–present	Incumbent
