= Mission sui iuris of the Turks and Caicos Islands =

Latin Catholic ecclesiastical jurisdiction in the Caribbean

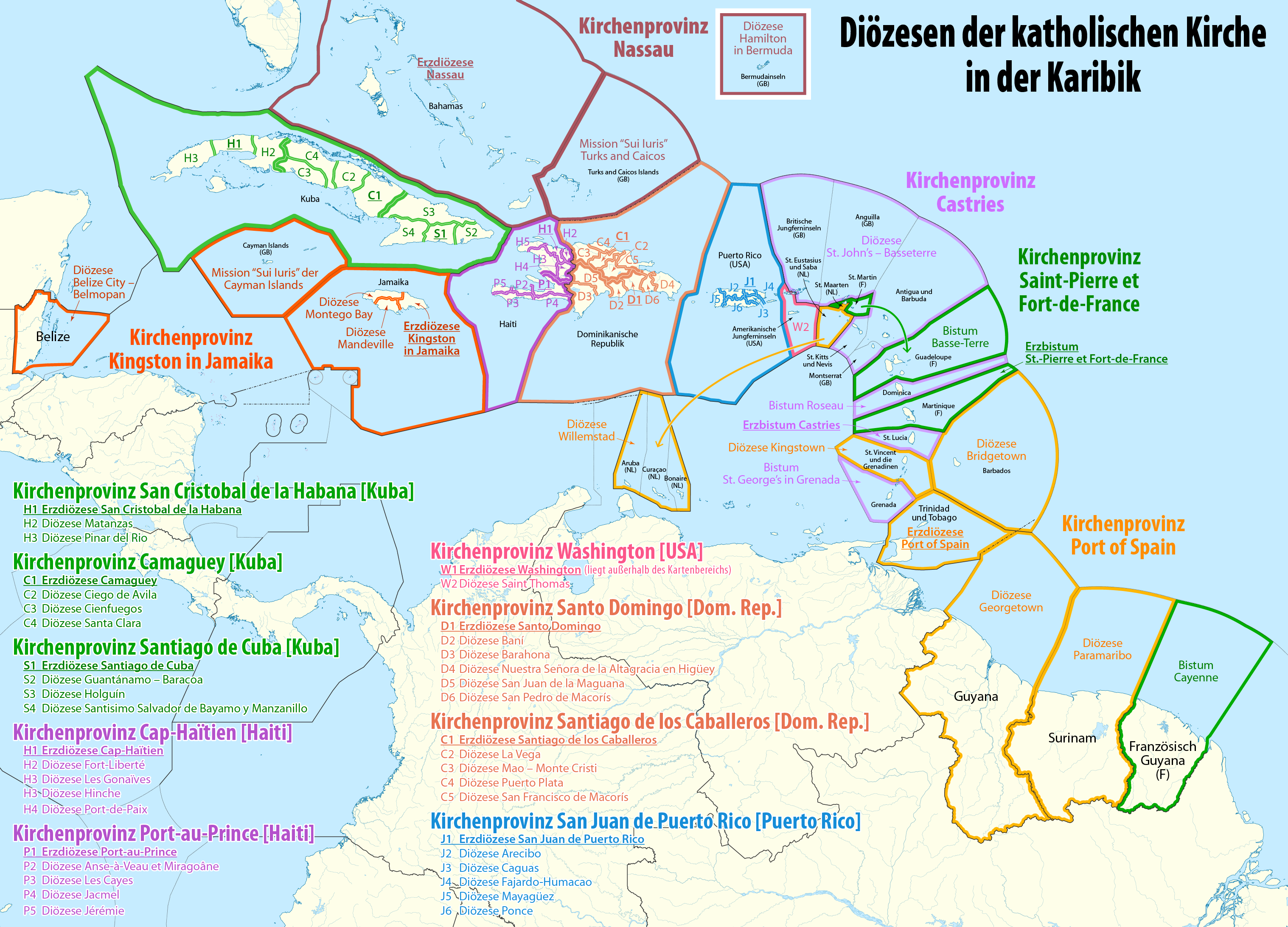
Map of the ecclesiastical provinces and dioceses of the Catholic Church in the Caribbean

The Mission sui iuris of Turks and Caicos (Latin: Missio Sui Iuris Turcensium et Caicensium) is a mission sui iuris of the Latin Catholic Church in the Caribbean. The mission encompasses the entirety of the British dependency of Turks and Caicos. The mission is a suffragan of the Archdiocese of Nassau and a member of the Antilles Episcopal Conference.

The mission of Turks and Caicos was erected from the Archdiocese of Nassau on 10 June 1984. It was initially attached to the Archdiocese of Nassau, with the Archbishop of Nassau serving as the superior and staffed by priests from the Bahamas. On 17 October 1998 it was transferred to the jurisdiction of the Archdiocese of Newark in the United States, and administrative responsibilities passed to Newark on 3 January 1999. The Archbishop of Newark, as the superior of the mission, appoints a vicar general for the Mission and priests from Newark staff its parishes.

== Locations ==
- Holy Family Academy - Catholic school(21.779818°N 72.271926°W)
- Our Lady of Divine Providence parish(21.782062°N 72.252751°W)
- St. Lucy's Chapel(21.491423°N 71.529019°W)
- Holy Cross parish(21.457782°N 71.142161°W)

== Ordinaries ==
1. Lawrence Aloysius Burke S.J. (1984–1998)
2. Theodore Edgar McCarrick (1998–2000), appointed Archbishop of Washington, DC
3. John Joseph Myers (2001–2017)
4. Joseph W. Tobin (2017–present)
