= Obba (town) =

Ancient town in Roman North Africa

Obba was an Ancient town in Roman North Africa. It is now a Latin Catholic titular see.

== Location ==
Obba was near Carthage, in modern Tunisia, and is placed in the Roman province of Africa Proconsularis by the Annuario Pontificio. Sophrone Pétridès is a lone voice in placing it in the split-off Roman province of Byzacena, further south.

According to the Catholic Encyclopaedia, it is the modern Ebba. (Abbah Quşūr?)

Pétridès says the town was situated on the highway from Carthage to Theveste (modern Tebessa), seven miles from Lares (now Lorbeus) and sixteen miles from Altiburus (Henshir Medina).

Werner Huß sees as the most likely location modern Henchir Bou Djaoua or Henchir Merkeb en-Nabi.

== History ==
Polybius mentions the town, under the name of Abba, as the place Syphax retreated to in the Second Punic War (218-201 BC) after Numidian king Masinissa and the Romans burned his camp near Utica, and Livy mentions it as where Syphax linked up with a body of 4000 Celtiberian mercenaries raised by Carthage's Hasdrubal Barca.

== Ecclesiastical history ==
A diocese was established there around 200 AD and of Africa and Christian bishopric, a suffragan of Carthage, the Metropolitan see of the North African ecclesiastical province, in the papal sway.

Three of its bishops are historically known :

- Paul, present at the Council of Carthage (225), called by Cyprianus of Carthage on the matter of lapsi, Christians who performed forced pagan sacrifices to avoid martydom; probably the Paul mentioned in the Martyrology for 19 January, executed under Roman emperor Valerian(us) I 'the Elder' (253–260)
  - Felicissimus, a Donatist schismatic, intervening at the Council of Carthage called in 411 with both bishops of that heresy and Catholics, which had no incumbent for Obba
- Valerianus, attended the Second Council of Constantinople in 553.

It was suppressed having faded, presumably with the 7th century advent of Islam.

== Titular see ==
The diocese was nominally restored as circa 1890 as Latin titular bishopric of Obba (Latin = Curiate Italian) / Obben(sis) (Latin adjective).

It has had the following incumbents, albeit with some intervals, mostly of the fitting Episcopal (lowest) rank, with a single archiepiscopal exception, both secular and regular :

- François-Xavier Corbet, Spiritans (C.S.Sp.) (French) (1898.07.05 – death 1914.07.25) as only Apostolic Vicar of Northern Madagascar (then French Madagascar) (1898.07.05 – 1913.05.20), (see) restyled first Vicar Apostolic of Diégo-Suarez (Madagascar) (1913.05.20 – 1914.07.25)
- Léon-Charles-Joseph Girod, C.S.Sp. (French) (1915.01.13 – death 1919.12.13) as Apostolic Vicar of Loango (then French Congo(-Brazzaville)) (1915.01.13 – 1919.12.13)
- Domenico Comin, Salesians (S.D.B.) (Italian) (1920.03.05 – 1963.08.17) as Apostolic Vicar of Méndez y Gualaquiza (Ecuador) (1920.03.05 – 1951.04.12), (see) restyled as first Apostolic Vicar of Méndez (Ecuador) (1951.04.12 – 1963.08.17)
- Joseph Khiamsun Nittayo (1963.09.13 – 1965.12.18) first as Coadjutor Apostolic Vicar of Bangkok (Thailand) (1963.09.13 – 1965.04.29), then succeeding as last Apostolic Vicar of Bangkok (1965.04.29 – 1965.12.18); later (see) promoted first Metropolitan Archbishop of Bangkok (Thailand) (1965.12.18 – retired 1972.12.18), President of Bishops’ Conference of Thailand (1970 – 1973), died 1998
- Jaime Lachica Sin (1967.02.10 – 1972.01.15) as Auxiliary Bishop of Archdiocese of Jaro (Philippines) (1967.02.10 – 1972.01.15); later Titular Archbishop of Massa Lubrense (1972.01.15 – 1972.10.08) as Coadjutor Archbishop of Jaro (1972.01.15 – 1972.10.08), succeeding as Metropolitan Archbishop of Jaro (1972.10.08 – 1974.01.21), transferred Metropolitan Archbishop of Manila (Philippines) (1974.01.21 – retired 2003.09.15), President of Catholic Bishops’ Conference of the Philippines (C.B.C.P.) (1976 – 1981), created Cardinal-Priest of S. Maria ai Monti (1976.05.24 – death 2005.06.21)
- Erwin Hecht, Missionary Oblates (O.M.I.) (1972.02.03 – 1974.07.01) as Auxiliary Bishop of Diocese of Kimberley (South Africa) (1972.02.03 – 1974.07.01); next succeeded as Bishop of Kimberley (1974.07.01 – retired 2009.12.15), died 2016

BIOs to ELABORATE

- Alberto Giraldo Jaramillo, Sulpicians (P.S.S.) (later Archbishop) (1974.08.08 – 1977.04.26)
- Protacio Gungon (1977.07.08 – 1983.01.24)
- George Patrick Ziemann (1986.12.23 – 1992.07.14)
- José Eduardo Velásquez Tarazona (1994.03.15 – 2000.07.01)
- Gustavo Rodríguez Vega (later Archbishop) (2001.06.27 – 2008.10.08)
- Titular Archbishop Joseph William Tobin, Redemptorists (C.SS.R.) (2010.08.02 – 2012.10.18)
- Rafał Markowski (2013.11.04 – ...), Auxiliary Bishop of the Archdiocese of Warszawa

== See also ==
- List of Catholic dioceses in Tunisia

== Sources and external links ==
- GigaCatholic, with links to titular incumbent biographies

Bibliography

- Pius Bonifacius Gams, Series episcoporum Ecclesiae Catholicae, Leipzig 1931, p. 467
- Stefano Antonio Morcelli, Africa christiana, Volume I, Brescia 1816, p. 248
- J. Mesnage, L'Afrique chrétienne, Paris 1912, p. 63
