= Daniel R. Jenky =

American Catholic prelate

His Excellency, The Most Reverend Daniel Robert Jenky
- Bishop Emeritus of Peoria
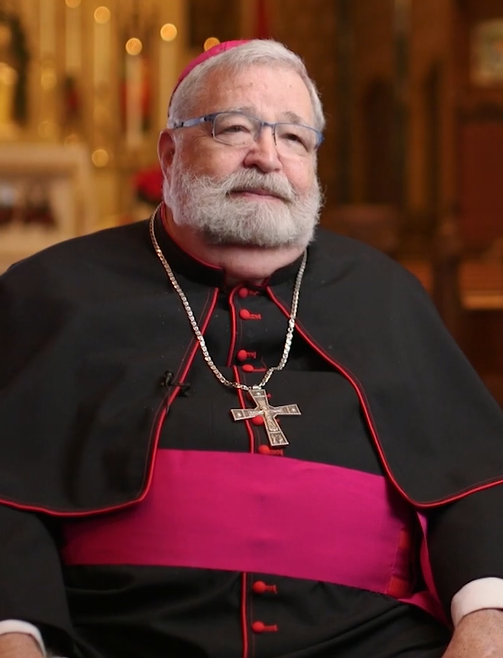
- Bishop Jenky in 2019
- Diocese: Peoria
- Appointed: February 12, 2002
- Installed: April 10, 2002
- Retired: March 3, 2022
- Predecessor: John J. Myers
- Successor: Louis Tylka
- Previous posts: Auxiliary Bishop of Fort Wayne-South Bend and Titular Bishop of Amantia (1997-2002); Rector of Dillon Hall at University of Notre Dame; Teacher at Bourgade Catholic High School in Phoenix, Arizona; Director of Campus Ministry, and Rector of Sacred Heart Church

Orders
- Ordination: April 6, 1974
- Consecration: December 16, 1997 by John Michael D'Arcy, Agostino Cacciavillan, and Charles Asa Schleck

Personal details
- Born: Daniel Robert Jenky; March 3, 1947 (age 79) Chicago, Illinois
- Education: University of Notre Dame
- Motto: His will is our peace

Styles of Daniel Robert Jenky
- Reference style: His Excellency; The Most Reverend
- Spoken style: Your Excellency
- Religious style: Bishop

Daniel Robert Jenky, CSC (born March 3, 1947) is an American prelate of the Roman Catholic Church who served as bishop of the Diocese of Peoria in Illinois from 2002 until his retirement in 2022. He also served as an auxiliary bishop of the Diocese of Fort Wayne-South Bend in Indiana from 1997 to 2002.

== Biography ==
=== Early life and education ===
Daniel Jenky was born on March 3, 1947, in Chicago, Illinois, and attended St. Laurence High School in Burbank, Illinois. He entered the University of Notre Dame in 1965, and the novitiate of the Congregation of Holy Cross at Bennington, Vermont in 1966. In 1970, Jenky obtained a Bachelor of History degree from Notre Dame. In 1973, he made his profession as member of the Congregation of Holy Cross. That same year, he earned his Master of Theology degree and received his diaconate.

=== Ordination and ministry ===
Jenky was ordained to the priesthood for the Congregation of Holy Cross on April 6, 1974. He then taught social studies and religion at Bourgade Catholic High School in Phoenix, Arizona. In 1975, Jenky returned to Notre Dame to become the rector of Dillon Hall, the director of campus ministry, and the rector of Sacred Heart Church, teaching courses as well. In 1985, Jenky became superior of the Holy Cross priests and brothers at Notre Dame.

=== Auxiliary Bishop of Fort Wayne-South Bend ===
On October 21, 1997, Pope John Paul II appointed Jenky as an auxiliary bishop of the Diocese of Fort Wayne-South Bend and titular bishop of Amantia. On December 16, 1997, he received his episcopal consecration from Bishop John M. D'Arcy, with Archbishop Agostino Cacciavillan and Archbishop Charles Schleck serving as co-consecrators. Jenky was assigned as rector of St. Matthew's Cathedral in South Bend, Indiana, and pastor of the parish.

=== Bishop of Peoria ===
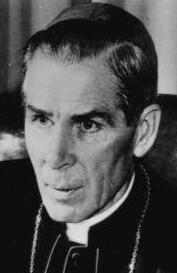
Fulton Sheen (1956)

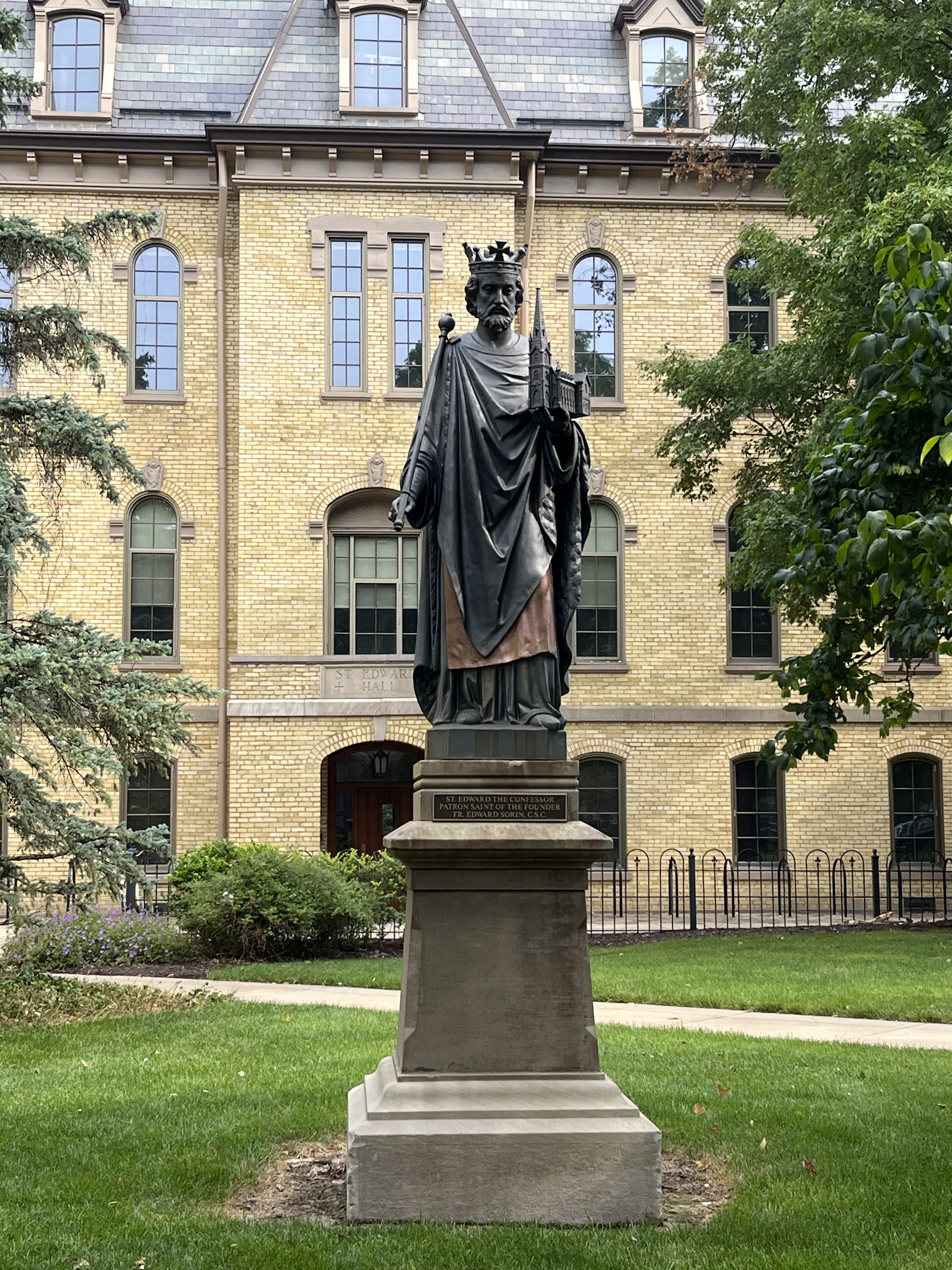
University of Notre Dame, Notre Dame, Indiana (2023)

On February 12, 2002, John Paul II appointed Jenky as bishop of the Diocese of Peoria. He was installed on April 10 at St. Mary's Cathedral in Peoria.

In an April 2012 "Men's March" homily, Jenky denounced the federal Affordable Care Act, President Barack Obama, and members of the U.S. Senate. He compared them to the early persecutors of Christians, barbarians, Nazis and Communists. He also cited "wave after wave of Jihads" and the "Age of Revolution". Jenky continued:

"… the Church will survive the entrenched corruption and sheer incompetence of our Illinois state government, and even the calculated disdain of the President of the United States, his bureaucrats and HHS, and the majority in today's Federal senate."

Over 90 faculty members at Notre Dame protested Jenky's remarks in a letter to Notre Dame President John I. Jenkins. The letter described his remarks as being insensitive and too political in tone. The faculty signers asked Jenky to either retract his statement or resign from the Notre Dame board of fellows.

Local chapters of the NAACP, the ACLU, and the Anti-Defamation League also demanded an apology from Jenky. Some called for the U.S. Internal Revenue Service to investigate Jenky because the diocese, as a tax-exempt, non-profit entity, was supposed to refrain from overtly political comments. Rabbi Daniel Bogard of Peoria's Anshai Emeth Congregation said that Jenky was engaging in demagoguery and using the Holocaust "as a partisan political ploy that trivializes the memory of 13 million innocents killed." In response to the criticism, vicar general James E. Kruse and Diocese of Peoria Chancellor Patricia Gibson said that Jenky was making an analogy to point out what he believed was an erosion of religious freedom and of the freedom of expression, particularly for Christians.

In 2002, Jenky started the canonization cause of Archbishop Fulton J. Sheen, a Peoria native. He requested that the Archdiocese of New York moved Sheen's remains, resting in St. Patrick's Cathedral in Manhattan, to Peoria. Jenky claimed that Archbishop Edward Egan of New York had promised Jenky to move Sheen's remains to Peoria if Jenky began a drive. However, New York archdiocesan officials said they could not find any record of that agreement and refused the request. Jenky then sued the archdiocese in civil court. After three years of litigation, a New York court in 2019 ordered the transfer of Sheen's remains to Peoria.

In February 2018, Jenky was sued along with the other Catholic bishops in Illinois. Two of the plaintiffs claimed sexual abuse by priests in the Diocese of Peoria during the 1970s and 1980s. Attorney Jeff Anderson accused Jenky of providing incomplete lists of priests who were considered credibly accused of sexual abuse. The diocese denied the charges. On August 21, 2018, Jenky made these remarks regarding the 2018 grand jury report in Pennsylvania regarding sexual abuse by priests:

I was truly saddened and deeply disturbed by the recent report from Pennsylvania of the sexual abuse of minors and the failures of some bishops to address of this crisis. I know that many of you share my sorrow. I stand with you. We also stand together in offering support to those who have suffered from these horrible offenses. These crimes harm the victims, weaken many people's faith, and hurt the entire Church.

=== Retirement and legacy ===
On March 3, 2022, Jenky's retirement as bishop of Peoria was accepted by Pope Francis.

== See also ==
- Catholic Church hierarchy
- Catholic Church in the United States
- Historical list of the Catholic bishops of the United States
- List of Catholic bishops of the United States
- Lists of patriarchs, archbishops, and bishops

Catholic Church titles
Preceded by Gyula Márfi	— TITULAR — Titular Bishop of Amantia; 1997–2002	Succeeded by Paul Tschang In-Nam
Preceded by John J. Myers	Bishop of Peoria; 2002–2022	Succeeded by Louis Tylka
Preceded by -	Auxiliary Bishop of Fort Wayne-South Bend; 1997–2002	Succeeded by -
