= Joseph W. Tobin =

American Catholic prelate (born 1952)

His Eminence Joseph W. Tobin CSsR
- Cardinal, Archbishop of Newark
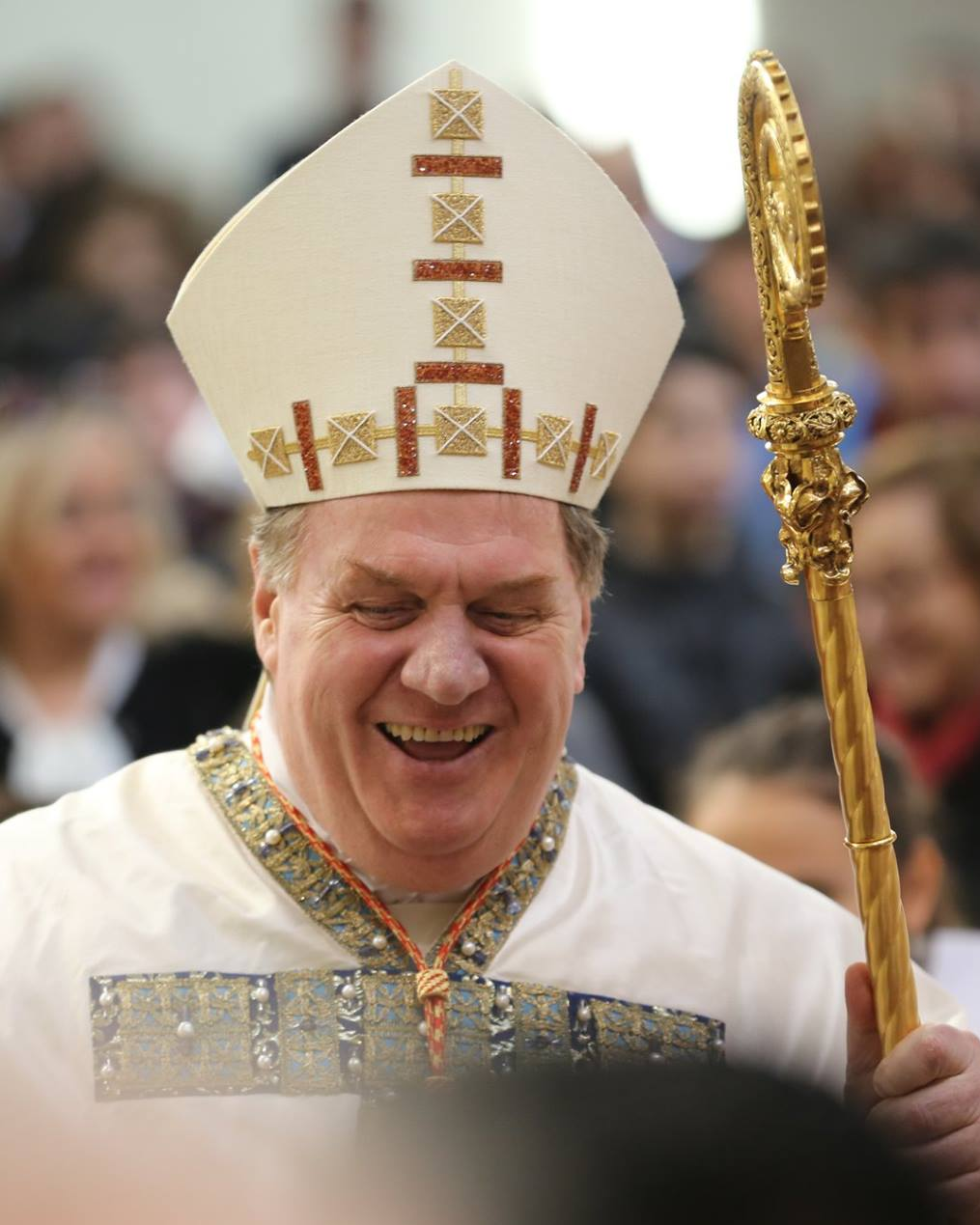
- Tobin in 2017
- Church: Catholic
- Archdiocese: Newark
- Appointed: November 7, 2016
- Installed: January 6, 2017
- Predecessor: John J. Myers
- Other posts: Cardinal Priest of Santa Maria delle Grazie a Via Trionfale (2017‍–‍present); Ecclesiastical Superior of Turks and Caicos (2016‍–‍present)
- Previous posts: Archbishop of Indianapolis (2012‍–‍2016); Secretary of the Congregation for Institutes of Consecrated Life and Societies of Apostolic Life (CICLSAL) (2010‍–‍2012); Titular Archbishop of Obba (2010‍–‍2012); Superior General of the Congregation of the Most Holy Redeemer (1997‍–‍2009)

Orders
- Ordination: June 1, 1978 by William Edward Cousins
- Consecration: October 9, 2010 by Tarcisio Bertone
- Created cardinal: November 19, 2016 by Pope Francis
- Rank: Cardinal Priest

Personal details
- Born: May 3, 1952 (age 74) Detroit, Michigan, US
- Motto: Gaudete in Domino (Latin for 'Rejoice in the Lord')
- Styles
- Reference style: His Eminence; The Most Reverend Eminence
- Spoken style: Your Eminence
- Religious style: Cardinal
- Informal style: Cardinal
- See: Newark

Ordination history
History
Episcopal consecration
- Principal consecrator: Tarcisio Bertone, SDB
- Co-consecrators: Franc Rode, CM; Agostino Vallini
Cardinalate
- Elevated by: Pope Francis
Episcopal succession
Bishops consecrated by Joseph W. Tobin as principal consecrator
- Gregory J. Studerus: 2020
- Elias R. Lorenzo: 2020
- Michael A. Saporito: 2020
- Kevin J. Sweeney: 2020
- Alfonso Vincenzo Amarante: 2023
- Pedro Bismarck Chau: 2025

Joseph William Tobin CSsR (born May 3, 1952) is an American prelate of the Catholic Church. A member of the Redemptorist order, he has been the Archbishop of Newark since 2017. He previously served as the Archbishop of Indianapolis from 2012 to 2016 and as secretary of the Congregation for Institutes of Consecrated Life and Societies of Apostolic Life from 2010 to 2012. He has been a cardinal since November 19, 2016.

== Early life and education ==
Joseph William Tobin was born in Detroit, Michigan, on May 3, 1952, the oldest of the 13 children of Joseph W. Tobin and Marie Terese Kerwin. His parents were immigrants from County Kerry, Ireland. He was baptized five days after his birth at the Church of the Most Holy Redeemer in Detroit, founded and administered by the Congregation of the Most Holy Redeemer (Redemptorists). He later attended the parochial school at the church.

By the time he had graduated, Tobin felt called to serve as a Catholic priest. He applied to join the Redemptorists, who accepted him as a candidate. He then attended St. Joseph's Preparatory College in Edgerton, Wisconsin, the Redemptorist minor seminary. After graduating from St. Joseph's in 1970, he was received into the Redemptorist novitiate to begin his formation as a member. Tobin made his temporary profession of religious vows as a member of the Redemptorists on August 5, 1972, and his perpetual vows on August 21, 1976.

In 1975, Tobin received a Bachelor of Arts degree in philosophy from Holy Redeemer College in Waterford, Wisconsin. He then studied at Mount St. Alphonsus Seminary in Esopus, New York, earning a Master of Religious Education degree in 1977 and a Master of Divinity degree in pastoral theology in 1979.

== Ordination and ministry ==
Tobin was ordained a priest for the Redemptorist Order by Archbishop William Cousins at Holy Redeemer College on June 1, 1978. The following year, Tobin returned to Detroit, where he was appointed the parochial vicar of Holy Redeemer Parish. He was later named pastor there, serving from 1984 to 1990. From 1980 to 1986, he served as an episcopal vicar for the Archdiocese of Detroit, and also assisted at the local diocesan marriage tribunal. From 1990 to 1991, Tobin served as pastor of St. Alphonsus Parish in Chicago, Illinois.

The Redemptorists elected Tobin as their general consultor in 1991 and as their superior general in 1997 He began a second term as superior general in 2003. That same year, he was named vice-president of the Union of Superiors General. Tobin also served as a member of the Council for Relations between the Congregation for Institutes of Consecrated Life and Societies of Apostolic Life and the International Union of Superiors General from 2001 to 2009.

In 2005, Tobin participated in a synod of bishops in Rome. He spent a week in a Spanish-language discussion group that included Archbishop Jorge Mario Bergoglio of Buenos Aires, the future Pope Francis.

Tobin took a sabbatical to Blackfriars Hall Priory in Oxford, England in 2010, residing with the De La Salle Brothers. While there, he pursued his interest in the rise of secularization and secular culture, attending seminars by anthropologist Peter B. Clarke, studying at the Las Casas Institute and taking classes at Blackfriars. Tobin speaks English, Spanish, French, Italian, and Portuguese.

== Roman Curia ==
Coat of arms as Secretary of the Congregation for Institutes of Consecrated Life and Societies of Apostolic Life

In May 2009, the Vatican named Tobin to oversee the professed men's element of the 2010 Apostolic Visitation of the Church in Ireland. On August 2, 2010, Tobin was appointed secretary of the Congregation for Institutes of Consecrated Life and Societies of Apostolic Life (CICLSAL) and titular archbishop of Obba. Tobin became the second American cleric to head CICLSAL. (Note: In 1969, Rev. Edward Heston, C.S.C., an Ohio native, was named secretary of the same Congregation by Pope Paul VI.)Tobin learned of his appointment two weeks before the Vatican announced it. He recalled:

I was painting my mom's house in Ontario when the phone rang. The voice on the other end said it was Cardinal Bertone, and my first thought was that it was a prank, … you know, I thought maybe it was one of the Redemptorists fooling around. Quickly, though, I realized that it really was Bertone, and he said that the Holy Father wants you to do this. My first reaction was to tell him that off the top of my head, I could give him the names of five people much more qualified to do this job than I am. I was completely serious about it. But Cardinal Bertone said no, this is what the Holy Father wants. He said I could take a week to ten days to think about it, so I talked to my superiors, my closest friends in religious life, and my spiritual director.

Tobin received his episcopal consecration in Rome on October 9, 2010. He had said:

[My] hope is that the Vatican's relationship with the local churches can be a sort of creative tension. I think life without tension would be very boring and useless. We can't walk, we can't talk, we can't sing without tension. You need to have tension in your vocal chords and your back, let alone a guitar. However, tension can be destructive. The challenge is to recognise the diversity of gifts and the plurality of churches and the one spirit that unites us. And I think that is the adventure of a lifetime.

When Tobin arrived at CICLSAL, it was already conducting a visitation—a critical inspection of ministries and organization—of the 341 institutes of apostolic women religious in the United States. At the same time, the Congregation for the Doctrine of the Faith (CDF) was conducting a doctrinal assessment of the Leadership Conference of Women Religious (LCWR), focused on its theological orthodoxy.

In December 2010, Tobin said that the Vatican needed to acknowledge the "depth of anger and hurt" among the nuns that was provoked by the CDF visitation, saying it illustrated the need for a "strategy of reconciliation" with women religious. The CDF issued its report on the LCWR in April 2012; Tobin was reportedly unhappy with the report content and the failure of the CDF to consult him before releasing it.

== Archbishop of Indianapolis ==
Coat of arms as Archbishop of Indianapolis

Coat of arms as cardinal (since 2016) and as Archbishop of Indianapolis

On October 18, 2012, Pope Benedict XVI appointed Tobin as archbishop of Indianapolis, a Catholic community of 246,000. He was installed on December 3, 2012. His reassignment from the Curia had been rumored since Tobin expressed his unhappiness with the CDF's highly critical report on the LCWR in April 2012.

In May 2016, the Vatican named Tobin to oversee the Sodalitium Christianae Vitae, a religious community that a Vatican review had found in need of thorough-going reform.

== Cardinal ==
On October 9, 2016, Francis announced that he would make Tobin a cardinal in a papal consistory on November 19, 2016. On that day, Tobin became a Cardinal-Priest of Santa Maria delle Grazie a Via Trionfale. Francis named Tobin a member of the Pontifical Council for Culture on November 11, 2019, a member of the Congregation for Bishops on March 4, 2021 and a member of the Supreme Tribunal of the Apostolic Signatura on June 21, 2021.

Tobin participated in the 2025 papal conclave, and was even considered papabile by a few sources, namely The New York Times. The National Catholic Reporter ran an article highlighting Tobin as a serious candidate, namely due to his charitable works as a Redemptorist, his support for Francis' agenda, and his vocal opposition to Donald Trump. However, all sources noted that there is a longstanding taboo within the church to elect a pope from the dominant global power. Regardless, Chicago-born Robert Francis Prevost would be elected the first ever American-born pope; Leo XIV, although he had largely lived in Peru and Rome since 1983.

== Archbishop of Newark ==
=== Appointment and tenure ===
On November 7, 2016, Francis named Tobin as archbishop of Newark, a city which had, like Indianapolis, never before been headed by a cardinal. He was installed there on January 6, 2017.

== Viewpoints ==
=== Abortion ===
Tobin in 2021 expressed concern about the exclusion of the Hyde Amendment from the proposed 2022 federal budget that President Joe Biden sent to the US Congress. Enacted in 1980, the amendment prohibited the use of federal funds for abortion services to women.

=== Capital punishment ===
In July 2020, Tobin and several other bishops petitioned President Donald Trump to commute the death sentence of Dustin Honken. He had been convicted in 2004 of murdering five people in Iowa, including two children. Tobin remarked that Honken's execution would "...reduce the government of the United States to the level of a murderer and serve to perpetuate a climate of violence which brutalizes our society in so many ways." Honken was executed later that month.

=== Clergy sex abuse ===
On August 17, 2018, the Catholic News Agency reported that six Newark priests had allegedly experienced sexual misconduct by two priests in seminary and ministry in the archdiocese. Tobin responded with a letter to the archdiocesan priests that the same day, saying that he had been unaware of the issue. He encouraged priests to refer media inquiries to the archdiocesan director of communications.

On August 25, 2018, Archbishop Carlo Maria Viganò, a former apostolic nuncio to the United States, released a letter describing a series of warnings to the Vatican regarding alleged sexual misconduct by then-cardinal Theodore McCarrick, a predecessor of Tobin in Newark. Viganò claimed that McCarrick "orchestrated" the appointment of Tobin as Archbishop of Newark. Tobin denounced Viganò's statement for "factual errors, innuendo and fearful ideology." He said that the letter "cannot be understood as contributing to the healing of survivors of sexual abuse" and called for "guaranteeing a safe and respectful environment where all are welcome and breaking down the structures and cultures that enable abuse."

One journalist claims that in a conversation with Tobin that he said that around the time he came to Newark in 2016 he heard "rumors" about McCarrick having slept with seminarians. However, Tobin chose not to believe them, stating that at the time they seemed too "incredulous" to be true.

In August 2020, Tobin disputed a Catholic New Agency in which anonymous priests claimed that a "gay subculture" existed in the archdiocese and in its college seminary.

=== Immigration ===
Tobin is a strong advocate of increased acceptance of migrants into the United States and of a lenient position towards undocumented immigrants. In March 2017, he accompanied 59-year old Catalino Guerrero, an undocumented immigrant, to his deportation hearing. In May 2018, Tobin called on Catholic leaders to resist Trump's immigration policies, saying, "you really have to believe in inflicting cruelty on innocent people to choose to support the policies we've seen in recent months."

In September 2019, Tobin gave a blessing to a crowd gathered outside the Immigration and Customs Enforcement (ICE) office in Newark. They were protesting the immigration policy of the Trump Administration that separated children from parents who were undocumented immigrants. He remarked, "These draconian measures are not a solution to our broken immigration system. They are violations to human dignity."

In January 2026, a day after the killing of Alex Pretti by United States Border Patrol agents in Minneapolis, Tobin denounced ICE as a "lawless organization" and urged Catholics to oppose additional funding for the agency.

=== LGBTQ issues ===
Tobin, in April, welcomed a "pilgrimage" of gay and lesbian Catholics and their families to the archdiocese's cathedral in 2017. In an interview before the Mass, Tobin said,

"The word I use is 'welcome'. These are people that have not felt welcome in other places. My prayer for them is that they do. Today in the Catholic Church, we read a passage that says you have to be able to give a reason for your hope. And I'm praying that this pilgrimage for them, and really for the whole Church, is a reason for hope."

In an interview with NBC's Anne Thompson In April 2019, Tobin said:

"The Church, I think, is having its own conversation about what our faith has us do and say with people in relationships that are same-sex. What should be without debate is that we are called to welcome them." Tobin was then asked about language in the Catechism of the Catholic Church that refers to homosexuality as "intrinsically disordered." Tobin answered, "Well I don't call them 'intrinsically disordered' ... It's very unfortunate language. Let's hope that eventually that language is a little less hurtful."

Tobin in 2019 expressed his support for the 2017 book called Building a Bridge, by Father James Martin, SJ, which called for the church to modify its relationship with LGBT people. Tobin commented that

"in too many parts of our church, LGBT people have been made to feel unwelcome, excluded, and even shamed. Father Martin's brave, prophetic, and inspiring new book marks an essential step in inviting church leaders to minister with more compassion, and in reminding LGBT Catholics that they are as much a part of our church as any other Catholic."

=== Political polarization ===
In June 2014, Tobin warned that the ideological polarization of American political life "helps to contribute to the balkanization of American Catholics into so-called right wing and left wing, or progressive and traditionalist, factions, who point fingers at each other". Speaking at a meeting of the College Theology Society, he said that:

"In my opinion, finger pointing does a great harm to religious life because it makes us defensive ... [and] we feel constantly compelled to defend ourselves against other parties in the church."

=== Tridentine Mass ===
In April 2023, Tobin said that he sympathized with Catholics who were unhappy about restrictions on the Tridentine Mass that were published by Pope Francis in his 2021 moto proprio Traditiones Custodes.

I would say the experience of feeling banished is something that is sadly part of the signs of the times, not simply for people who very much love the Traditional Mass.

=== Women in the church ===
Tobin supports greater roles for women in the Catholic Church. In an interview with The New York Times on December 22, 2017, Tobin said that he "understand[s] the consternation" among women who find themselves frustrated that they are not permitted to become priests. When asked about the possibility of a female cardinal, he responded, "Maybe my theology isn't sophisticated enough, but I don't believe that there's a compelling theological reason why the pope couldn't name a woman cardinal."

== See also ==
- Catholic Church in the United States
- Hierarchy of the Catholic Church
- Historical list of the Catholic bishops of the United States
- List of Catholic bishops in the United States
- Lists of popes, patriarchs, primates, archbishops, and bishops

== Notes ==
Catholic Church titles
| Preceded by Juan Manuel Lasso de la Vega y Miranda | Superior General of the Redemptorists; September 9, 1997 – November 4, 2009 | Succeeded by Michael Brehl |
| Preceded by Gustavo Rodriguez Vega | — TITULAR — Titular Archbishop of Obba; August 2, 2010 – October 18, 2012 | Succeeded by Rafał Markowski |
| Preceded by Gianfranco Gardin | Secretary of the Congregation for Institutes of Consecrated Life and Societies of Apostolic Life; August 2, 2010 – October 18, 2012 | Succeeded by José Rodríguez Carballo |
| Preceded by Daniel Mark Buechlein | Archbishop of Indianapolis; October 18, 2012 – November 7, 2016 | Succeeded by Charles Coleman Thompson |
| Preceded by John Joseph Myers | Archbishop of Newark; November 7, 2016 – | Incumbent |
| Preceded by John Joseph Myers | Ecclesiastical Superior of the Turks and Caicos Islands; November 7, 2016 – | Incumbent |
| Preceded by Silvano Piovanelli | Cardinal-Priest of Santa Maria delle Grazie a Via Trionfale; November 19, 2016 – | Incumbent |
