= Peter Joseph O'Reilly =

Most Reverend Peter J. O'Reilly
- Auxiliary Bishop of Peoria
- Church: Catholic Church
- See: Titular See of Lebedus
- Appointed: January 5, 1968
- In office: September 21, 1900 - December 16, 1923

Orders
- Ordination: June 24, 1877
- Consecration: September 21, 1900 by Sebastiano Martinelli

Personal details
- Born: April 14, 1850 Moynalty, County Meath, United Kingdom of Great Britain and Ireland
- Died: December 16, 1923 (aged 73) Peoria, Illinois

Peter Joseph O'Reilly (April 14, 1850 – December 16, 1923) was an Irish-born bishop of the Catholic Church in the United States. He served as an auxiliary bishop of the Diocese of Peoria from 1900 to 1923.

== Biography ==
Born in the village of Moynalty in County Meath of the United Kingdom of Great Britain and Ireland, Peter O'Reilly was ordained a priest on June 24, 1877. On July 3, 1900 Pope Pius X appointed him as the Titular Bishop of Lebedus and Auxiliary Bishop of Peoria. He was consecrated a bishop by Archbishop Sebastiano Martinelli, O.S.A., the Apostolic Delegate to the United States, on September 21, 1900. The principal co-consecrators were Bishops Henry Cosgrove of Davenport and James Ryan of Alton. O'Reilly continued to serve as an auxiliary bishop until his death on December 16, 1923, at the age of 73.
