= John J. Myers =

American Catholic archbishop (1941–2020)

His Excellency, The Most Reverend John Joseph Myers
- Archbishop of Newark; Ecclesiastical Superior of Turks and Caicos
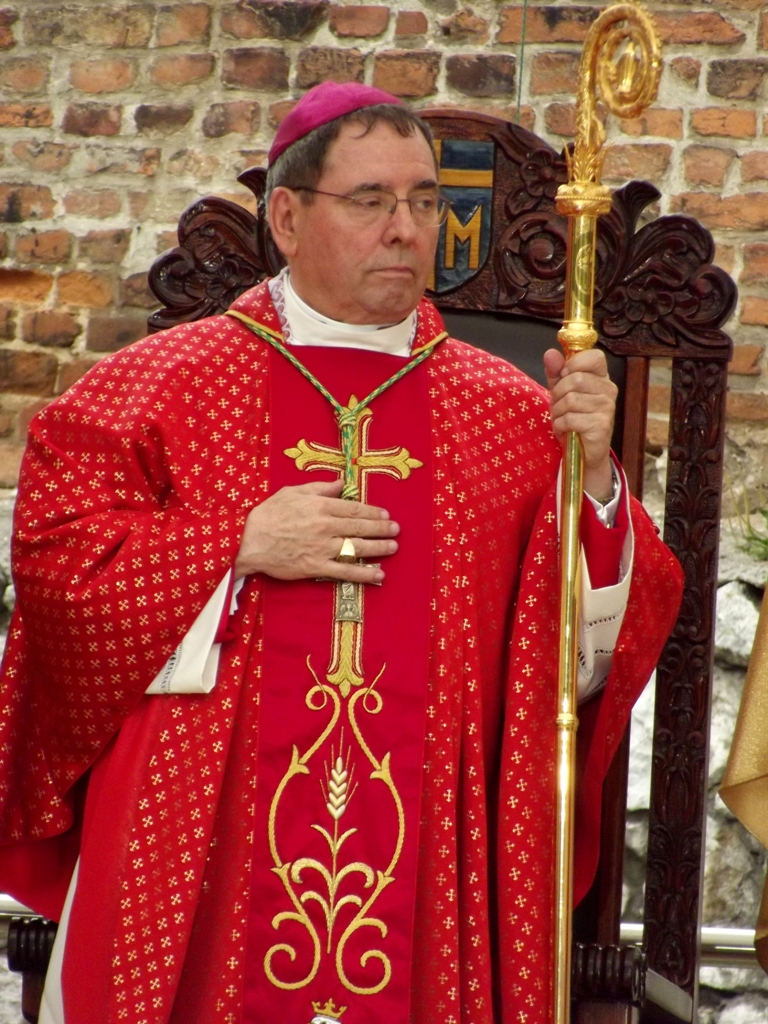
- Archdiocese: Newark
- Appointed: July 24, 2001
- Installed: October 9, 2001
- Term ended: November 7, 2016
- Predecessor: Theodore Edgar McCarrick
- Successor: Joseph William Tobin
- Other post: Ecclesiastical Superior Emeritus of Turks and Caicos
- Previous posts: Bishop of Peoria (1990–2001); Coadjutor Bishop of Peoria (1987–1990)

Orders
- Ordination: December 17, 1966 by Francis Frederick Reh
- Consecration: September 3, 1987 by Edward W. O'Rourke, Thomas C. Kelly, and Donald Wuerl

Personal details
- Born: July 26, 1941 Ottawa, Illinois, U.S.
- Died: September 24, 2020 (aged 79) Ottawa, Illinois, U.S.
- Education: Pontifical Gregorian University; North American College
- Motto: Mysterium ecclesiae luceat (Let the mystery of the church shine forth)

Styles of John Joseph Myers
- Reference style: His Excellency; The Most Reverend
- Spoken style: Your Excellency
- Religious style: Archbishop

Ordination history of John J. Myers
History
Episcopal consecration
- Consecrated by: Edward William O'Rourke
- Date: September 3, 1987
Episcopal succession
Bishops consecrated by John J. Myers as principal consecrator
- Edgar Moreira da Cunha: June 27, 2003
- Gaetano Aldo Donato: May 21, 2004
- John Walter Flesey: May 21, 2004
- Manuel Aurelio Cruz: June 9, 2008

John Joseph Myers (July 26, 1941 – September 24, 2020) was an American prelate of the Roman Catholic Church. He served as bishop of the Diocese of Peoria in Illinois between 1990 and 2001, ecclesiastical superior of Turks and Caicos from 2001 to 2016 and as archbishop of the Archdiocese of Newark in New Jersey during the same period.

== Biography ==
=== Early life ===
John Myers was born on July 26, 1941, in Ottawa, Illinois, the eldest of seven children. The Myers family farmed land near Earlville, Illinois. Myers became an altar server in his parish, St. Theresa, from an early age. He attended the Earlville schools and graduated from Loras College in Dubuque, Iowa in 1963. While he was a student at Loras, Myers studied for the priesthood in Rome under Bishop John Franz.

=== Priesthood ===
Myers was ordained to the priesthood by Bishop Francis Reh at St. Peter's Basilica in Rome for the Diocese of Peoria on December 17, 1966. He studied theology at the Pontifical Gregorian University while attending seminary at the North American College. He received a Licentiate in Sacred Theology, and a Doctor of Canon Law degree.

After his ordination, Myers served as assistant pastor at Holy Family Parish in Peoria for one year. He then went to Washington, D.C., to serve in the Department of International Affairs of the United States Catholic Conference from 1970 to 1971. Returning to Illinois, Myers was appointed as associate pastor of St. Matthew Parish in Champaign, Illinois, from 1971 until 1974.

Myers' positions with the diocese included:

- Administrator of St. Mary Cathedral (1977–1978 and 1984)
- Vice chancellor (1977–1978)
- Vocations director (1977–1987)
- Chancellor (1978–1987)
- Vicar general (1982–1990)

Myers was also a member of the presbyteral council (1968–1970 and 1984–1990) and the board of consultors (1978–1990).

=== Coadjutor Bishop and Bishop of Peoria ===
On July 7, 1987, Pope John Paul II appointed Myers as coadjutor bishop of the Diocese of Peoria to assist Bishop Edward O'Rourke. Myers was consecrated on September 3, 1987, with O'Rourke as the principal consecrator. Archbishops Thomas Kelly and Donald Wuerl served as the co-consecrators.

When the Holy See accepted O'Rourke's resignation as bishop on January 23, 1990, Myers became bishop of Peoria. While bishop, Myers issued an order forbidding Catholic hospitals in the diocese from providing emergency contraception to rape victims, a restriction he later eased. He also fired a teacher at a Catholic high school for inviting a speaker to discuss the ordination of women to the priesthood. During Myers' tenure the diocese saw a rapid increase in vocations to the priesthood, with many seminarians being drawn to his more conservative theology.

In August 2013, the Diocese of Peoria settled a sexual abuse lawsuit for $1.35 million. The plaintiff, Andrew Ward, had accused Thomas Maloney, a diocese priest, of molesting him during the 1990s when he was eight years old. The lawsuit claimed that Myers, then bishop in Peoria, allowed Maloney to remain in ministry despite evidence of prior sexual abuse.

=== Archbishop of Newark ===
On July 24, 2001, Pope John Paul II appointed Myers as the fifth archbishop of the Archdiocese of Newark and third superior of the Mission Sui Iuris of Turks and Caicos. He was installed on October 9, 2001, and the pallium was conferred on June 29, 2002.

In 2001, Myers banned eulogies at funeral masses, saying that some of them were inappropriate and too long. After pushback from parishioners, he reversed himself. On April 1, 2004, Myers criticized a group of law students at Seton Hall University for honoring Supreme Court Justice Sandra Day O'Connor because she allegedly favored abortion rights for women.

In 2002, The Dallas Morning News listed Myers among bishops and diocese administrators who had allowed priests accused of sexual abuse to continue working.

==== Settlements ====
In 2005 and 2007, the Diocese of Metuchen and the Archdiocese of Newark paid financial settlements to two priests who had accused Cardinal Theodore McCarrick of abuse. According to Cardinal Wuerl, no one from the Archdiocese of Newark informed him of these settlements, even though the retired McCarrick began living on the grounds of a seminary in the Archdiocese of Washington.

==== Fugee case ====
In 2001, Michael Fugee, an archdiocese priest at St. Elizabeth's Parish in Wyckoff, New Jersey, was accused of molesting a 14-year-old boy on multiple occasions in the 1990s. Fugee confessed to police in 2001 to fondling a teenage boy, but later recanted it, saying he had been pressured by investigators. He was charged, tried and convicted in 2003 of criminal sexual contact. However, Fugee's conviction was overturned in 2006 by an appellate court. To avoid a retrial, Fugee signed an agreement with the Bergen County, New Jersey, Prosecutor's Office in 2007. He agreed to a lifetime ban working in contact with children. The archdiocese co-signed the agreement, promising it would supervise Fugee.

In September 2009, the archdiocese assigned Fugee as chaplain at Saint Michael's Medical Center in Newark. However, after learning about Fugee's record, Saint Michael's demanded that the archdiocese remove him. The archdiocese later admitted that they never informed the hospital, only the head of the archdiocese chaplain's office. In 2013, Fugee was discovered working in youth ministry at St. Mary's Parish in Colts Neck, New Jersey, a parish in the Diocese of Trenton. Myers said he was unaware of Fugee's youth work and immediately suspended him. There were calls for Myers to resign, including from members of the New Jersey State Legislature, because of his handling of the Fugee case. In early 2014, the Bergen County prosecutors agreed to not press new charges against Fugee if the church laicized him. In May 2014, he was.

==== Coadjutor archbishop ====
On September 24, 2013, Pope Francis named Bishop Bernard Hebda as coadjutor archbishop of the archdiocese to assist Myers. However, on June 15, 2016, Francis named Hebda as the new archbishop of the Archdiocese of Saint Paul and Minneapolis. Hebda was not replaced with another coadjutor.

==== Activities ====
Myers was active in the Canon Law Society of America, having worked with committees dealing with the revised Code of Canon Law, diocesan fiscal officers, lay ministry, and diocesan governance, and served as a member of the CLSA board of governors. He helped present workshops on the revised Code of Canon Law for members of the National Conference of Catholic Bishops.

Myers also served as a consultor to the Pontifical Council for the Interpretation of Legal Texts at the Holy See. He was also a member of the board of trustees at The Catholic University of America; and served on the board of the Pontifical North American College and Mount Saint Mary's Seminary in Emmitsburg, Maryland.

Myers' hobby was writing. He is the co-author with Gary K. Wolf of Space Vulture, a 1950s-style pulp science-fiction novel published by Tor Books in 2008.

==== Retirement home controversy ====
In February 2014, The New York Times reported that Myers planned to retire to a "palace" being expanded to 7,500 square feet (700 m^{2}) at his direction in Pittstown, New Jersey. The home was then assessed at $776,700. The improvements were estimated to cost at least $500,000 with architects' fees. Furnishings promised to add to the existing $500,000 bill.

Archdiocese spokesman Jim Goodness defended the installation of a 14 by 7 feet (4.3 m × 2.1 m) pool by saying "The press says it's a hot tub; it's a whirlpool...He's getting older – there are therapeutic issues." Myers' residence was the object for more opprobrium when the diocese closed an elementary school that helped immigrant children for lack of funds.

NJ.com contrasted Myers' residence with the lifestyle of Pope Francis, said to live frugally. Francis had previously urged bishops to avoid living "like princes." Charles Zech, from the Center for Church Management and Business Ethics at Villanova University business school, said that Myers was ignoring Pope Francis and taking money out of the pockets of parishioners. A petition requesting that Myers sell the property garnered 17,000 signatures. After Myers moved back to Illinois in January 2020, the archdiocese announced that it would sell Myers' residence.

=== Retirement ===
Pope Francis accepted Myers' resignation as archbishop of Newark and superior of the Turks and Caicos on November 7, 2016. Myers moved near his family in Illinois in January 2020, as his physical and mental health declined. He died on September 24, 2020 in Ottawa at age 79.

== Views ==
In May 2004, Myers published a pastoral letter saying that Catholic elected officials who supported abortion rights for women should not be offered communion during mass. This letter prompted the Catholic Governor, James E. McGreevey, a supporter of abortion rights, to state that he would no longer seek communion at mass.

On April 30, 2010, Myers expressed concern about a planned offering of a course on same-sex marriage at Seton Hall University, saying it "troubles me greatly."

Catholic Church titles
| Preceded by Theodore Edgar McCarrick | Archbishop of Newark; July 24, 2001 – November 7, 2016 | Succeeded by Joseph W. Tobin |
| Preceded by Theodore Edgar McCarrick | Ecclesiastical Superior of Turks and Caicos; October 9, 2001 – November 7, 2016 | Succeeded by Joseph W. Tobin |
| Preceded by Edward William O'Rourke | Bishop of Peoria; January 23, 1990 – July 24, 2001 | Succeeded by Daniel Robert Jenky, C.S.C. |
