= Cathedral of Saint Mary of the Immaculate Conception (Peoria, Illinois) =

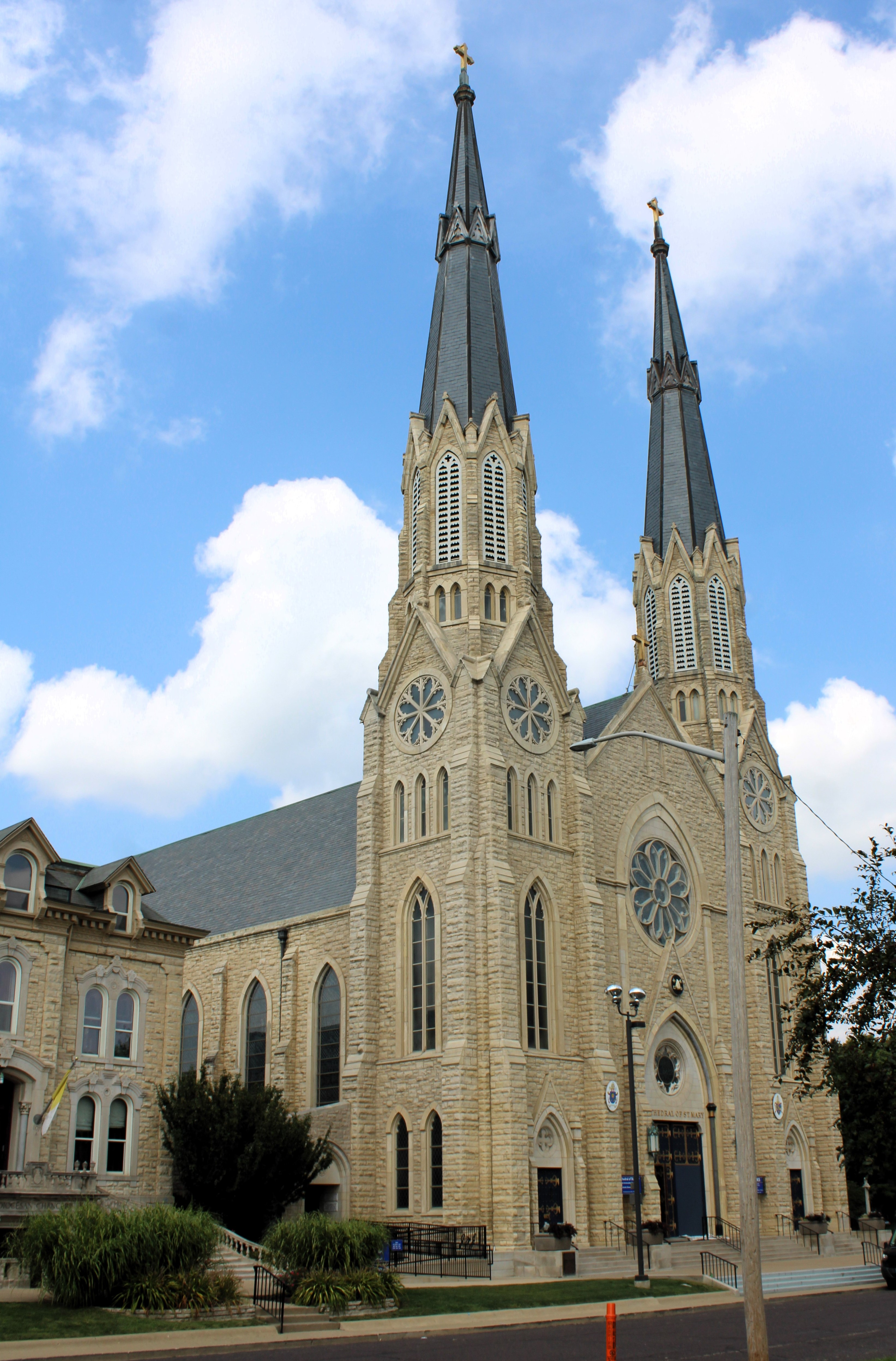
- Cathedral of Saint Mary of the Immaculate Conception in 2023

- Location within Peoria County, Illinois
- 40°41′54.9″N 89°35′6.1″W
- Location: 607 NE Madison Ave. Peoria, Illinois
- Country: United States
- Denomination: Roman Catholic Church
- Website: www.catholicpeoria.com

History
- Status: Cathedral
- Founded: 1846

Architecture
- Functional status: Active
- Architect: Casper Mehler
- Style: Gothic Revival
- Groundbreaking: 1885
- Completed: 1889

Specifications
- Length: 170 feet (52 m)
- Width: 80 feet (24 m)
- Materials: Anamosa Limestone

Administration
- Diocese: Peoria

Clergy
- Bishop: Most Rev. Louis Tylka
- Rector: The Very Rev. William Miller
- St. Mary's Cathedral; Catholic Diocesan Chancery Office
- U.S. Historic district – Contributing property
- Part of: North Side Historic District (ID83003588)
- Added to NRHP: November 21, 1983

The Cathedral of Saint Mary of the Immaculate Conception (commonly known as St. Mary's Cathedral) is a cathedral of the Catholic Church located in Peoria, Illinois, United States. It is the seat of the Diocese of Peoria, where the Catholic televangelist and sainthood candidate Archbishop Fulton J. Sheen was born and raised, and ordained a priest. Since 2019, the cathedral has been his place of burial. The cathedral is listed on the National Register of Historic Places as a contributing property in the North Side Historic District.

== History ==
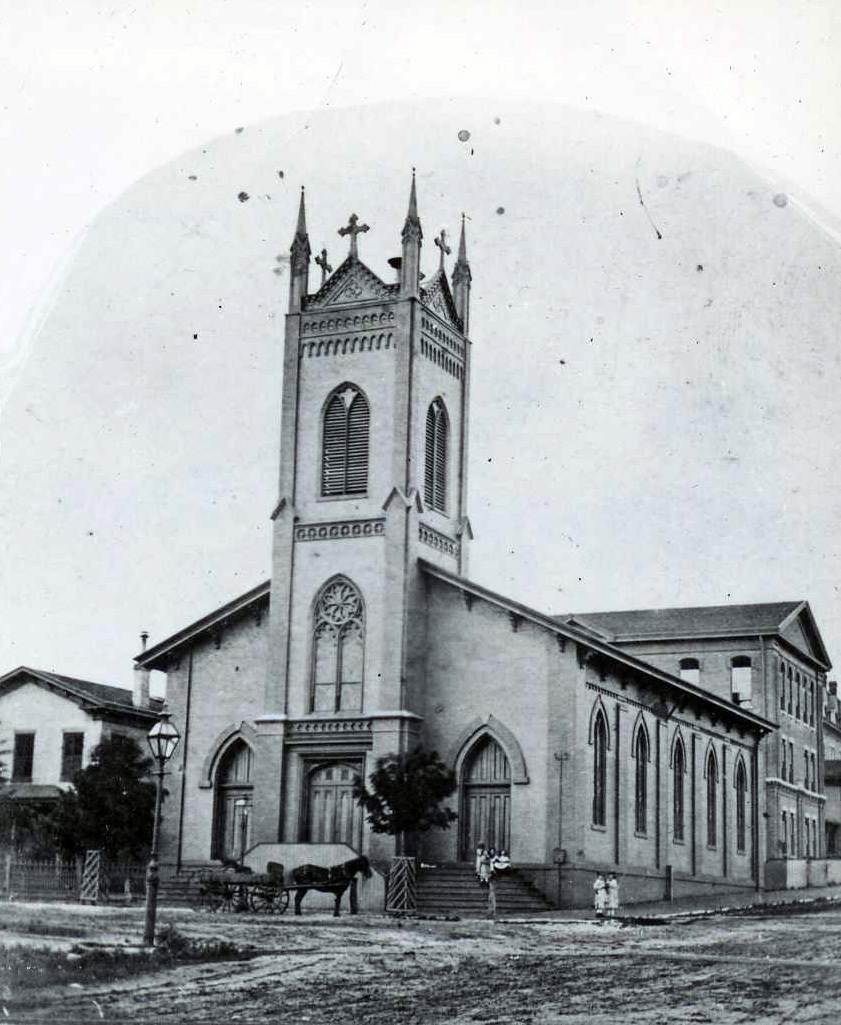
Old St. Mary's

The first Mass in the vicinity of Peoria was celebrated at Fort Crevecoeur, across the Illinois River from the present city. The Récollets stationed at the fort included the Revs. Gabriel Ribourde, Zenobius Membre and Louis Hennepin. Father Reho celebrated Mass in the city of Peoria in 1839, and the Rev. John A. Drew founded St. Mary's Church in 1846. The church that would become the first St. Mary's Cathedral was built in 1851.

Chicago architect Casper Mehler designed the present cathedral to reflect the style of St. Patrick's Cathedral in New York City. The cornerstone was laid on June 28, 1885, by Bishop John Lancaster Spalding. Construction on the cathedral was completed in 1889. The exterior is composed of Anamosa Limestone and the twin spires on the main façade rise to a height of 230 feet (70 m). The painting of the Crucifix on the reredos behind the altar was painted in 1873 by the Spanish artist Yzquierda. It was purchased by Bishop Spalding and originally hung in the old cathedral. It and a bell in the south tower are all that remain of Old St. Mary's, which was taken down in 1898. The present pipe organ, Wicks Organ Company, Opus 1503, was installed in 1936. It features 3,329 pipes.

The cathedral church and the neighboring Bishop's House, now used for other purposes, are among the contributing properties in the North Side Historic District added to the National Register of Historic Places in 1983.

Saint Teresa of Calcutta, better known as Mother Teresa, visited St. Mary's for a mass in her honor in 1995.

The cathedral underwent a major renovation beginning in 2014 and finishing in 2016. The restoration and renovation work was performed by Daprato Rigali Studios.

On June 27, 2019, the remains of Archbishop Fulton J. Sheen were disinterred from St. Patrick's Cathedral in New York, where he was buried in 1979, and transferred to St. Mary's Cathedral. They are entombed in a marble monument at a side altar dedicated to Our Lady of Perpetual Help. The Archdiocese of New York fought a three-year court battle to keep his remains there. As a child, Sheen served as an altar boy in St. Mary's Cathedral and he was ordained a priest here in 1919 for the Diocese of Peoria, which has sponsored his cause for canonization.

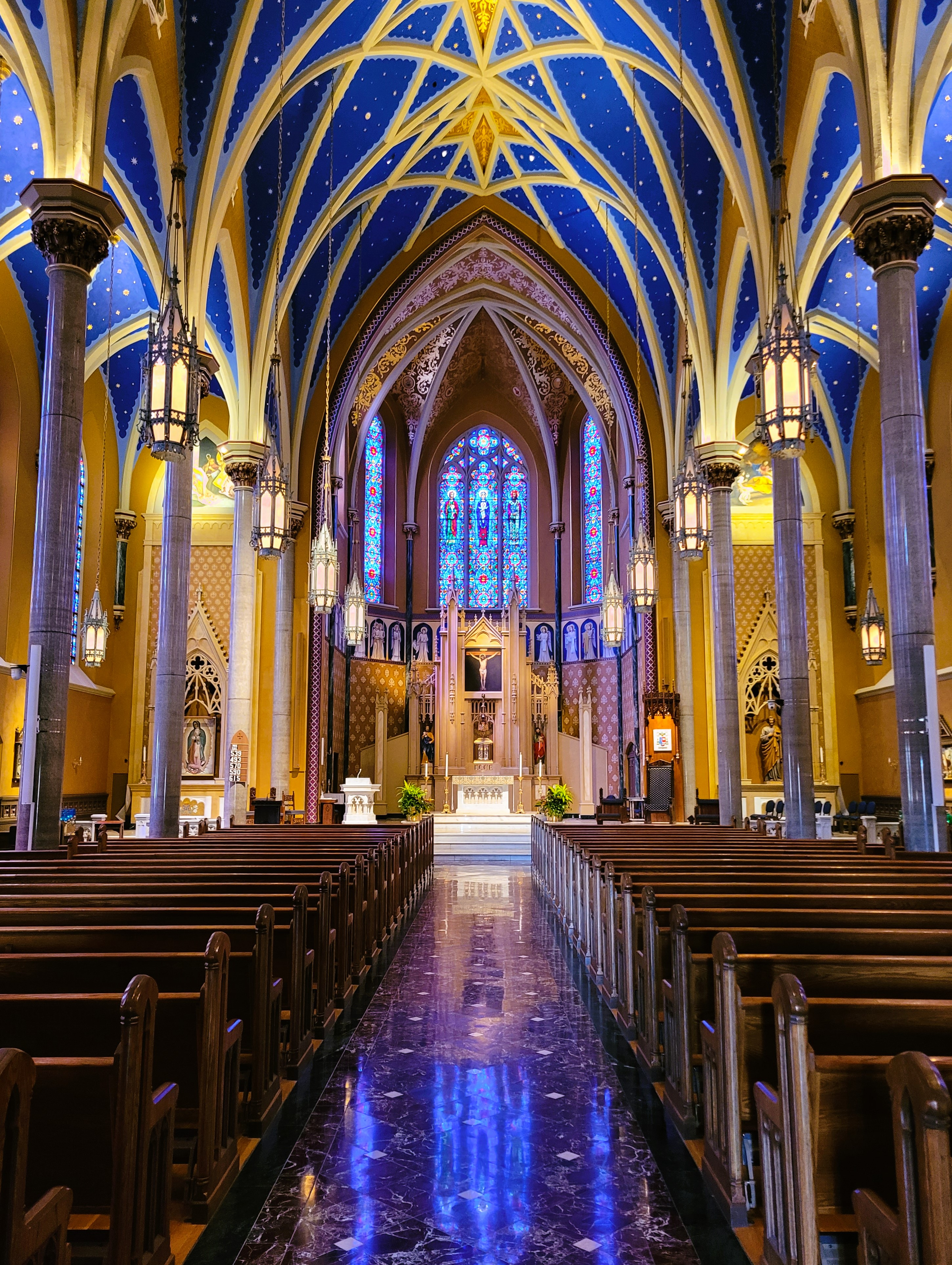
View up the nave toward the chancel

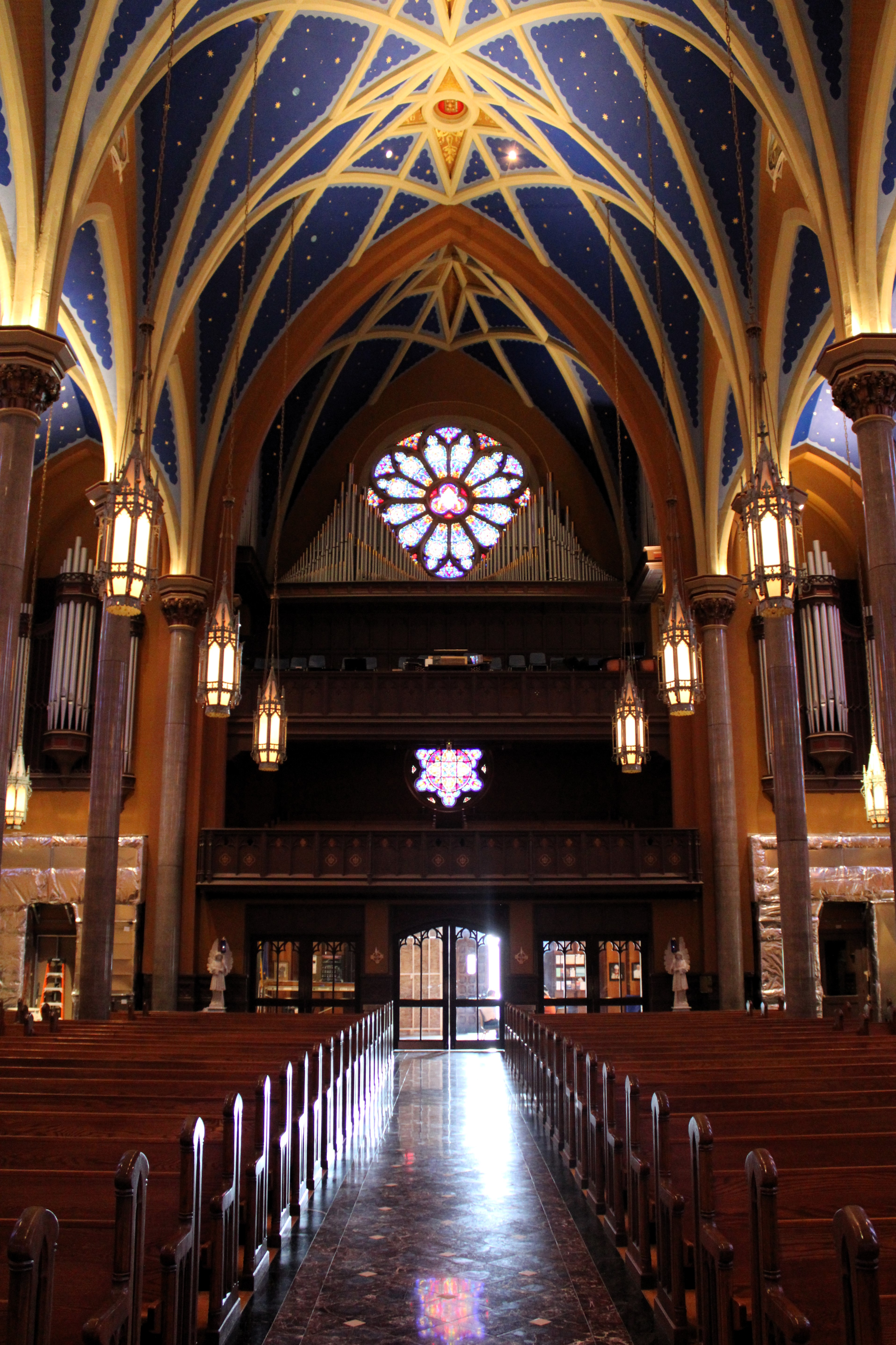
View down the nave toward gallery

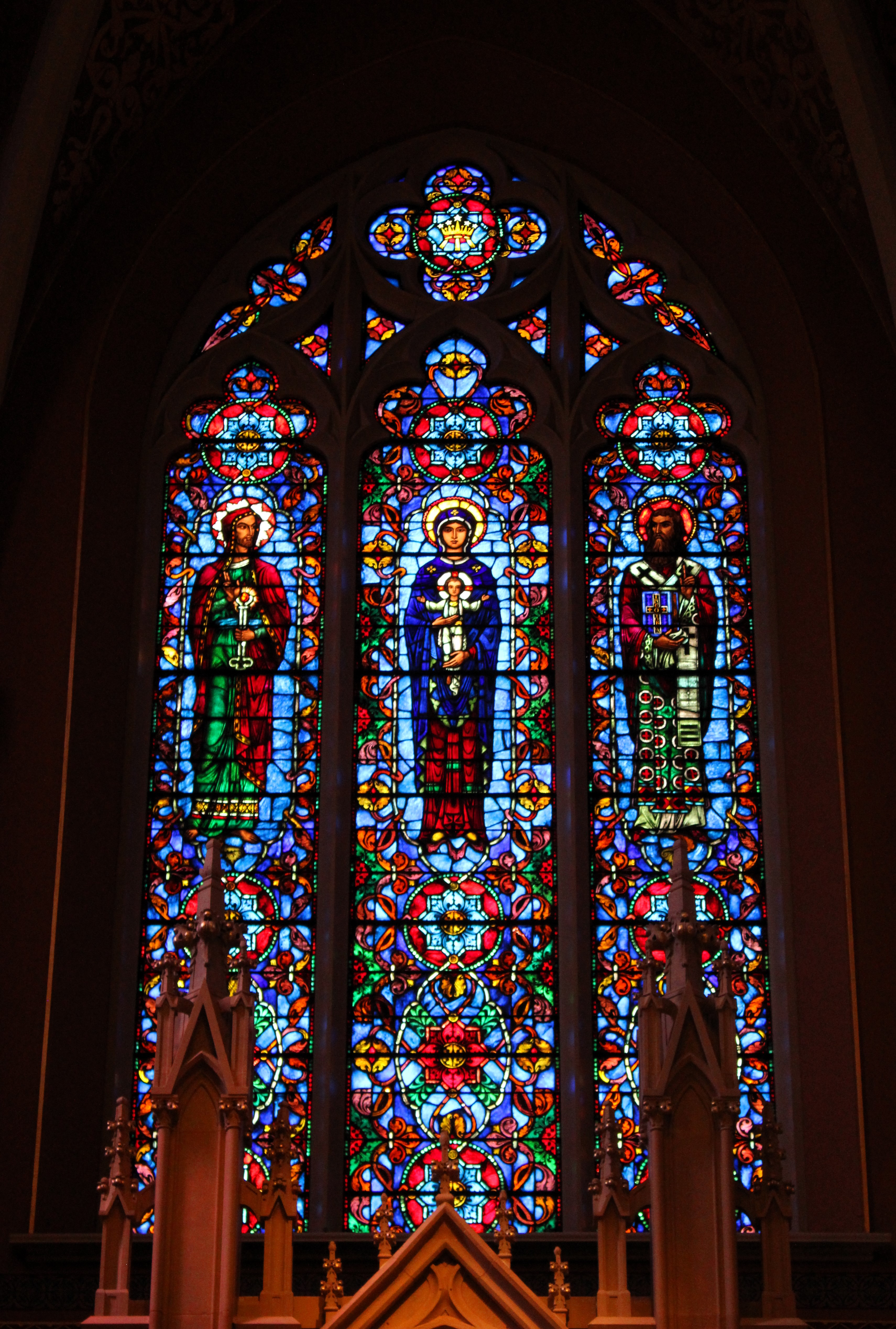
Stained glass window

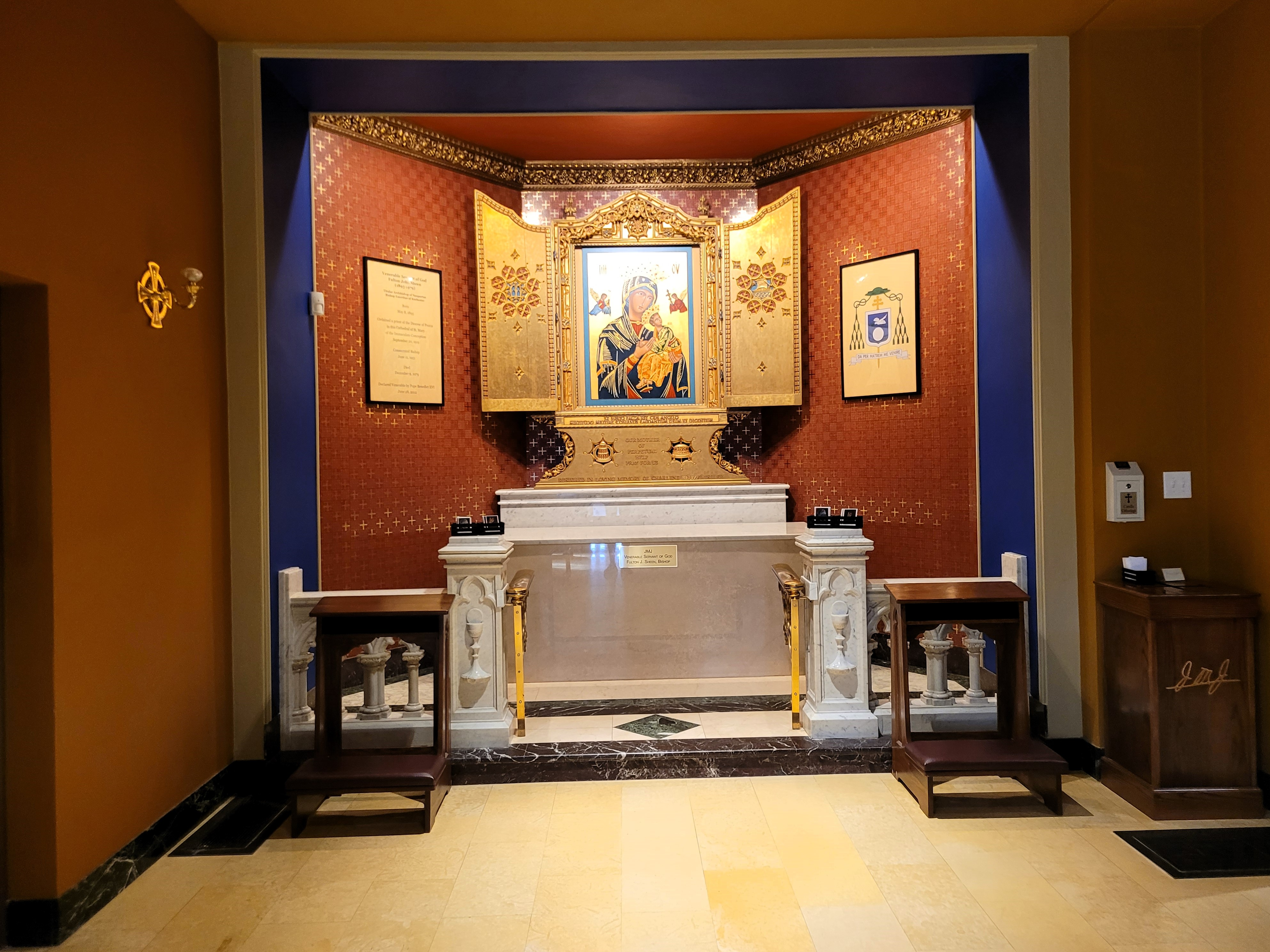
Fulton Sheen tomb

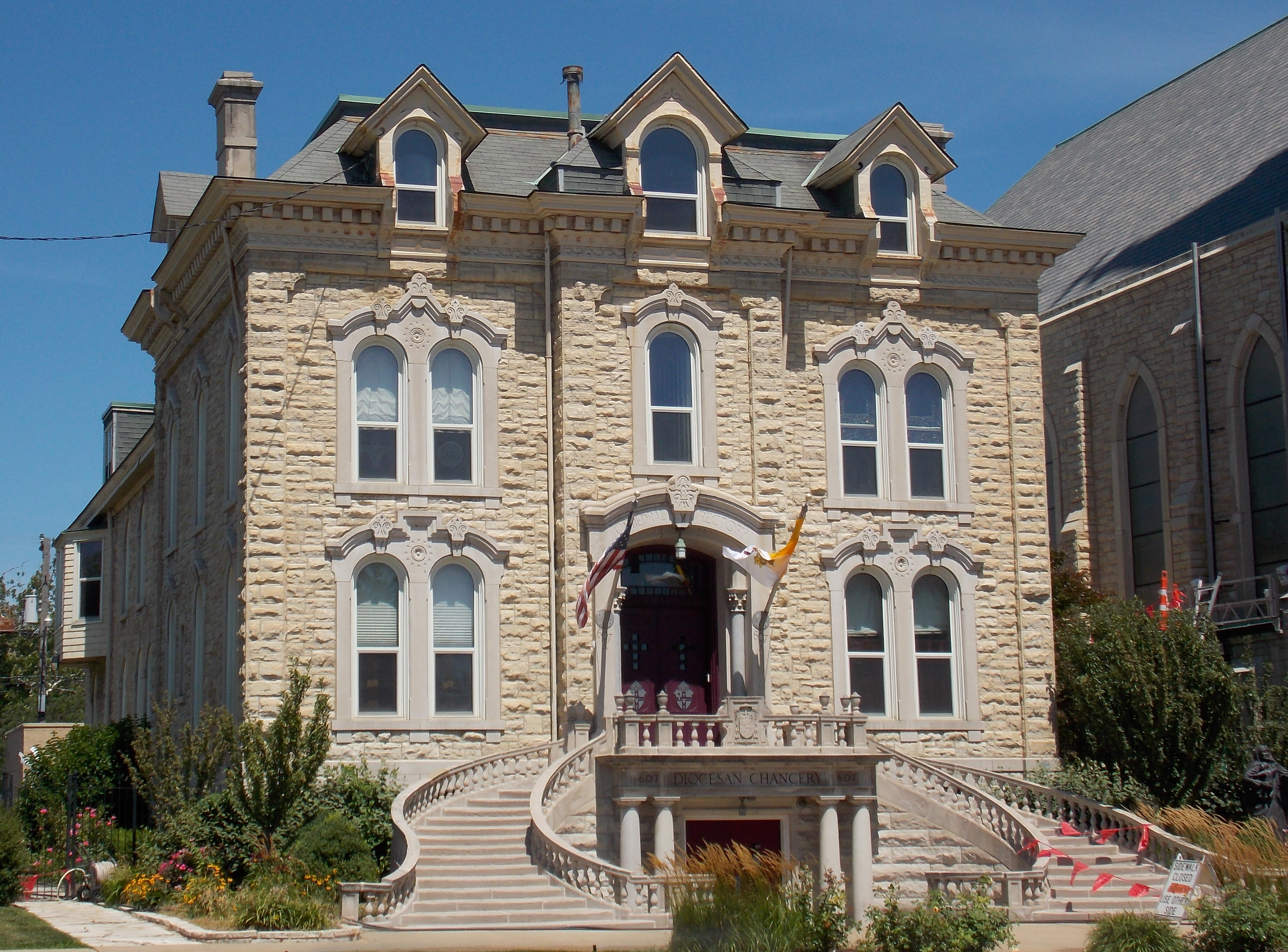
St. Mary's Rectory, formerly the Diocesan Chancery

== Interments ==
- Blessed Fulton J. Sheen

== See also ==
- List of Catholic cathedrals in the United States
- List of cathedrals in the United States
