= Pope Pius IX and Russia =

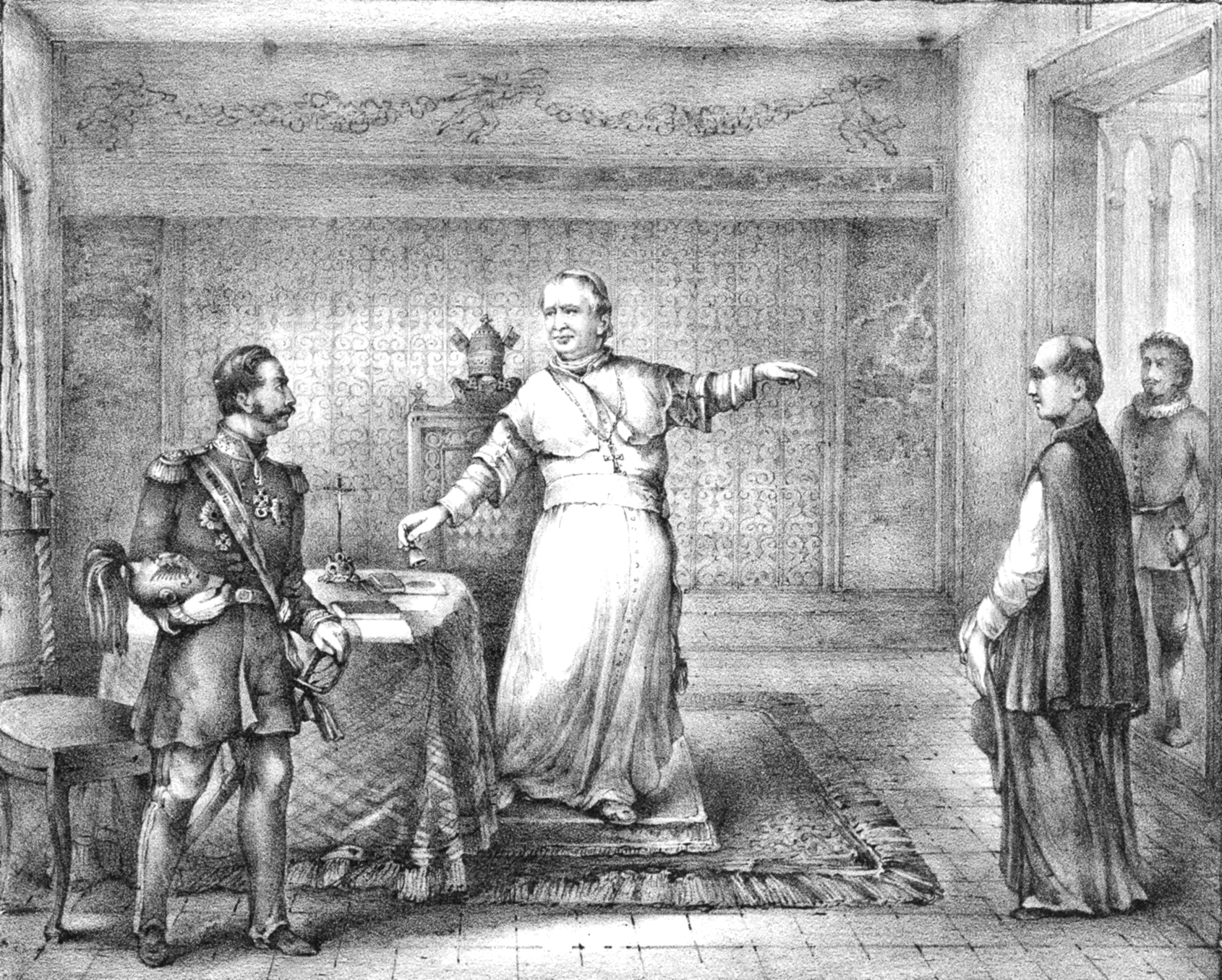
Expulsion of the Russian envoy to the Holy See Felix von Meyendorff by Pope Pius IX for insulting the Catholic faith

Pope Pius IX and Russia includes the relations between the Pontiff and the Russian Empire during the years 1846–1878.

== 1847 Accomodamento ==
The Pontificate of Pius IX began in 1847 with an agreement by which both the government and the Holy See played a part in filling vacant Latin Church episcopal sees in Russia proper and in the Congress Kingdom of Poland.

Pope Pius IX, who faced his own problems with revolutionary movements in his Church State, first tried to position himself in the middle, strongly opposing revolutionary and violent opposition against the Russian authorities, and appealing to them for more Church freedom.

== Polish aspirations and avoiding bloodshed ==
Both the Holy See and the Russian government expressed their full satisfaction, which was not shared by the Russian Orthodox Church. The Accomodamento, while facilitating the establishment of new dioceses, did little to improve the situation of the Catholic Church at the local level.

In 1850, some 32 monasteries were closed and others limited in the recruitment of novices. Local priests were replaced with politically correct candidates, and vacant bishop sees were not allowed to be filled. A special problem continued to be the fate of the Oriental Churches, united with Rome, which were reunified with the Orthodox Church of Russia after the Synod of Polotsk in 1839.

== Relations with Russia after 1861 ==
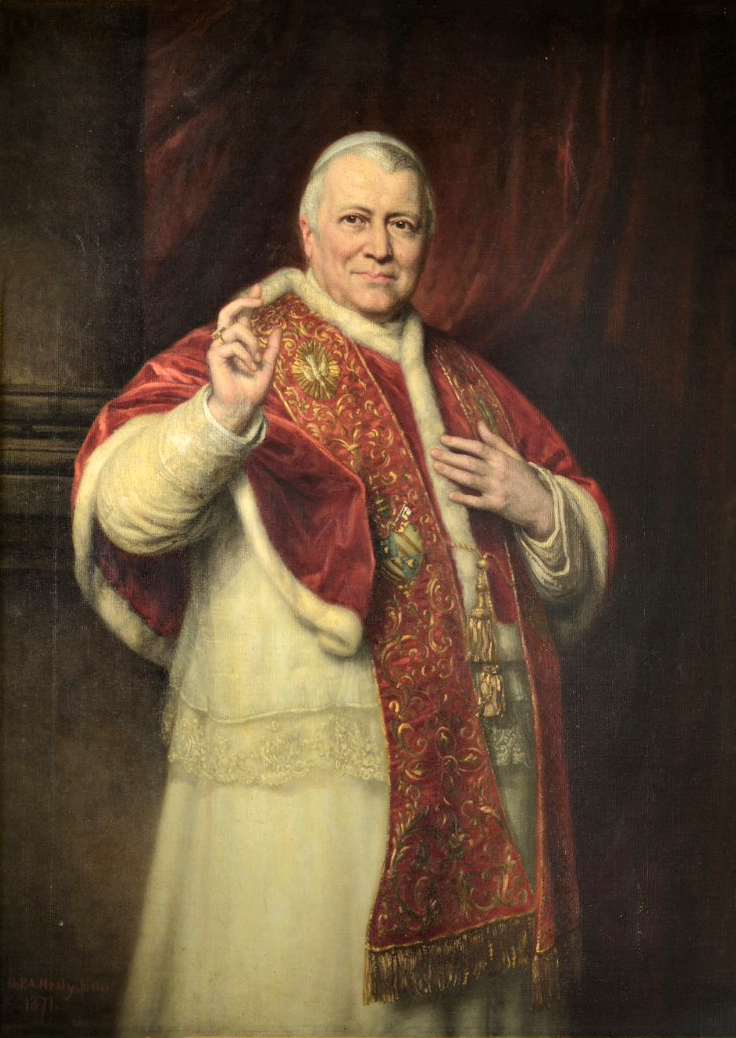
Pope Pius IX in 1871

After long negotiations, and possibly because of the lingering Polish crises, Russia agreed to diplomatic relations with the Vatican in 1861.

Tsar Alexander II claimed that only politically revolutionary elements were punished. On August 20, the Pope protested and ordered a prayer novena for the persecuted Church. But the persecutions worsened: 330 priests were deported, a war tax was imposed on the clergy, and 114 Catholic monasteries were closed.

International protest from Pope Pius enraged the Tsar and his regime, and led to an Austrian intervention, urging the Pope to be silent in the interest of the Polish Catholics. Russia answered with a break of the concordat on December 6, 1863. By 1870, not a single bishop in the Congress Kingdom of Poland was left in his own diocese.

== Diplomacy of Pope Leo XIII ==
Pope Leo XIII (1878–1903) attempted to improve the situation with diplomatic overtures, with little success. The nightmare of the Russian Church continued under him, more pleasant atmospherics not-withstanding. The 19th century dilemma, that impressive Papal condemnations may result in suffering, closure of episcopal sees, and decade-long interruption of religious services for, and education of the faithful, haunted Papal diplomacy in the 20th century, especially during the pontificates of Pope Pius XI, Pope Pius XII and Pope Paul VI.

=== References ===
- Acta Apostolicae Sedis ( AAS), Roma, Vaticano 1922-1960
- Acta et decreta Pii IX, Pontificis Maximi, VolI-VII, Romae 1854 ff
- Acta et decreta Leonis XIII, P.M. Vol I-XXII, Romae, 1881, ff
- Actae Sanctae Sedis, (ASS), Romae, Vaticano 1865
- L. Boudou, Le S. Siege et la Russie, Paris, 1890
- Owen Chadwick, The Christian Church in the Cold War, London 1993
- Handbuch der Kirchengeschichte, VII, Herder Freiburg, 1979, 355-380
- Matthias Erzberger, Erlebnisse im weltkrieg, Stuttgart,
- Herder Korrespondenz Orbis Catholicus, Freiburg, 1946–1961
- Andrey Micewski, Cardinal Wyszynski, A biography, Harcourt, New York, 1984
- Josef Schmidlin Papstgeschichte, Vol I-IV, Köstel-Pusztet München, 1922–1939
- John Gilmary Shea, The Life of Pope Pius IX, New York, 1877

== See also ==
- Foreign relations of the Holy See
