= Zenobius Membre =

French Franciscan Recollect friar and missionary

Zenobius Membré, O.M.R. (1645 – c.1687), was a French Franciscan Recollect friar and missionary in North America.

== Life ==
Membré was born at Bapaume, then in the ancient Province of Artois, and entered the local friary of the Franciscan Recollect Province of St. Anthony. He arrived in Canada in 1675, and in 1679 he accompanied Robert de La Salle to the country of the Illinois, of which he wrote a description. His missionary work there had little success.

In 1681 Membré descended the Mississippi River with La Salle to the Gulf of Mexico, returned with the leader of the expedition to Europe by way of Canada. There he became Guardian of the Franciscan friary in his native city.

Membré returned to American and in 1684, along with two other Franciscans and three Sulpicians, sailed with La Salle, intending to found a colony at the mouth of the Mississippi River, but inaccurate maps and navigational errors caused them to anchor 400 miles (644 km) west, off the coast of Texas near Matagorda Bay. La Salle erected Fort St. Louis, a 50-mile (80 km) overland trek from Matagorda Bay in 1685, near what is now Inez, Texas. Membre endeavored to establish a mission among the Cenis nation (Hasinai). In this he failed.

After about two years Membre was killed, along with Father Maximus Le Cerq, Father Chefdeville, and the small garrison which La Salle had left at the settlement.
