= John Baptist Franz =

Catholic bishop (1896–1992)

His Excellency, The Most Reverend John Baptist Franz
- Bishop of Peoria
- See: Diocese of Peoria
- Installed: August 8, 1959
- Term ended: May 24, 1971
- Predecessor: William Edward Cousins
- Successor: Edward William O'Rourke
- Other post: Bishop of Dodge City (1951–1959)

Orders
- Ordination: June 13, 1920 by John J. Glennon
- Consecration: August 29, 1951 by Samuel Stritch

Personal details
- Born: October 29, 1896 Springfield, Illinois, US
- Died: July 3, 1992 (aged 95) Peoria, Illinois, US
- Denomination: Roman Catholic Church
- Education: Franciscan College; Kenrick Seminary
- Motto: Fide et fortitudine (With faith and fortitude)

Styles of John Baptist Franz
- Reference style: The Most Reverend
- Spoken style: Your Excellency
- Religious style: Monsignor
- Posthumous style: none

John Baptist Franz (October 29, 1896 – July 3, 1992) was an American prelate of the Roman Catholic Church. He served as bishop of the Diocese of Dodge City in Kansas (1951–1959) and bishop of the Diocese of Peoria in Illinois (1959–1971).

== Biography ==
=== Early life ===
John Franz was born on October 29, 1896, in Springfield, Illinois, to Fridolin and Louisa (née Reisch) Franz. His father worked in the meat packing business. He recalled that his parents "provided us an atmosphere that made us conscious we were Catholic and that we belonged to the Church. I never wanted to be anything but a priest."

Franz received his early education at the parochial school of SS. Peter and Paul Parish in Springfield. Between 1910 and 1917, he attended St. Francis Solanus High School and the Franciscan College, both in Quincy, Illinois. Franz then studied at Kenrick Seminary in St. Louis, Missouri.

=== Priesthood ===
Franz was ordained a priest in Webster Groves, Missouri, for the Diocese of Alton by Archbishop John J. Glennon on June 13, 1920. From 1920 to 1927, as a member of the Granite City-based Diocesan Mission Band, he traveled around Central Illinois and Eastern Missouri to give missions and retreats. In 1926, he was assigned to establish a campaign fund for a cathedral complex in Springfield.

Franz became administrator of St. Mary's Parish and superintendent of St. Isidore High School, both in Farmersville, Illinois, in 1927. From 1935 to 1951, he served as rector of the Cathedral of the Immaculate Conception in Springfield. The Vatican named Franz as a papal chamberlain in 1941 and a domestic prelate in 1945.

=== Bishop of Dodge City ===
On May 27, 1951, Franz was appointed the first bishop of the newly erected Diocese of Dodge City by Pope Pius XII. He received his episcopal consecration at the Cathedral of the Immaculate Conception on August 29, 1951, from Cardinal Samuel Stritch, with Bishops Mark Carroll and William O'Connor serving as co-consecrators.

=== Bishop of Peoria ===
On August 8, 1959, Pope John XXIII appointed Franz as bishop of Peoria. From 1962 to 1965, Franz attended the Second Vatican Council in Rome. In response to his implementation of the council's reforms, some people expressed enthusiasm, while others caution to such rapid changes. The political turmoil of the 1960s also added to his challenges, but he still managed to create 17 new grade schools, two new high schools, one Newman Centre, four new parishes, four missions, and elevate eight missions to parish status.

=== Retirement and death ===
On May 24, 1971, Pope Paul VI accepted Franz's resignation as bishop of Peoria. John Franz died in Peoria on July 3, 1992, at age 95. He is buried at St. Mary's Cemetery in Peoria.

Catholic Church titles
Preceded by none	Bishop of Dodge City; 1951–1959	Succeeded by Marion Francis Forst
Preceded by William Edward Cousins	Bishop of Peoria; 1959–1971	Succeeded by Edward William O'Rourke
