= Daniel E. Sheehan =

American prelate of the Catholic Church (1917–2000)

His Excellency, The Most Reverend Daniel Eugene Sheehan
- Archbishop of Omaha; Titular Bishop of Capsus
- Church: Catholic Church
- Archdiocese: Archdiocese of Omaha
- Appointed: June 11, 1969
- Installed: August 11, 1969
- Term ended: May 4, 1993
- Predecessor: Gerald Thomas Bergan
- Successor: Elden Francis Curtiss

Orders
- Ordination: May 23, 1942 by James Hugh Ryan
- Consecration: March 19, 1964 by Gerald Thomas Bergan

Personal details
- Born: May 14, 1917 Emerson, Nebraska, U.S.
- Died: October 24, 2000 (aged 83) Omaha, Nebraska, U.S.
- Education: Catholic University of America

Daniel Eugene Sheehan (May 14, 1917 – October 24, 2000) was an American prelate of the Roman Catholic Church. He served as Archbishop of Omaha from 1969 to 1993. He previously served as an auxiliary bishop of the same archdiocese from 1964 to 1969.

== Biography ==
=== Early life ===
Daniel Sheehan was born on May 14, 1917, in Emerson, Nebraska. He studied theology at Kenrick Seminary in St. Louis, Missouri, where he graduated with honors in 1942.

Sheehan was ordained to the priesthood for the Archdiocese of Omaha by Archbishop James Hugh Ryan on May 23, 1942. After his ordination, Sheehan was assigned to St. Cecilia's Cathedral in Omaha. He then attended the Catholic University of America in Washington, D.C., receiving a degree in canon law. After returning to Omaha, he served as chancellor and tribunal judge.

=== Auxiliary Bishop of Omaha ===
On January 4, 1964, Sheehan was appointed auxiliary bishop of Omaha and Titular Bishop of Capsus by Pope Paul VI. He received his episcopal consecration on March 19, 1964, from Archbishop Gerald Bergan, with Bishops John Paschang and James Casey serving as co-consecrators, at St. Cecilia Cathedral.

=== Archbishop of Omaha ===
Sheehan was named by Paul VI as the third archbishop of the Archdiocese of Omaha on June 11, 1969. He was installed on August 11, 1969, the first native son of the archdiocese to become archbishop. During his tenure, Sheehan has earned a national reputation for his support of Catholic education. His campaign for educational excellence raised more than $26 million to improve Catholic education in the Omaha Metropolitan Area. In recognition of his dedication to Catholic schools, the National Catholic Educational Association presented him with the Elizabeth Ann Seton Award in 1992.

In response to the reforms of the Second Vatican Council, Sheehan led efforts to establish the Archdiocesan Pastoral Council (APC) in the early 1970s. He gathered representatives from the ranks of the clergy, religious communities and laity to lay the groundwork for a pastoral council that would share in the local church's decision-making process. Due to APC action, emphasis has been placed on improving family life, youth and young adult ministry, evangelization, social and rural life issues and Hispanic ministry. He led large capital campaigns to raise millions of dollars for archdiocesan improvements, including a $4.5 million refurbishment of the St. James Center. His final campaign had a goal of $25 million to pay for the building of Skutt Catholic High School and other capital needs in the Archdiocese of Omaha and its parishes

=== Retirement and legacy ===
Pope John Paul II accepted Sheehan's resignation as archbishop of Omaha on May 4, 1993. Daniel Sheehan died in Omaha on October 24, 2000, at age 83.

In 2002, it was revealed Sheehan failed to remove Rev. Thomas Sellentin after numerous allegations of sexual abuse.

Catholic Church titles
Preceded by Gerald Thomas Bergan	Archbishop of Omaha; 1969–1993	Succeeded by Elden Francis Curtiss
Preceded by –	Auxiliary Bishop of Omaha; 1964–1969	Succeeded by –
