= Joseph A. Suneg =

American member of the Catholic clergy

Msgr. Joseph A. Suneg, ca 1973

Joseph Anthony Suneg (11 October 1897 – 21 May 1989) was ordained a priest of the Catholic Church in the United States and later elevated to Domestic Prelate by Pope Pius XII in official recognition of his service to the growth of the Catholic Church in Omaha. He established the landmark 12-acre St. Margaret Mary Church campus in the heart of Omaha adjacent to University of Nebraska at Omaha and Memorial Park (Omaha) on U.S. Route 6 (Dodge Street). His only assignment lasted forty-six years—the entirety of his active priestly career.

== Early life ==
József Anton Szunega was born in Bačka Palanka, at that time part of the Austro-Hungarian Empire settled by the Danube Swabians. He was baptized on the day of his birth at the Church of the Immaculate Conception of the Blessed Virgin Mary. In 1906, he emigrated to the United States sailing aboard the SS Zeeland (1900) from Antwerp with his mother and three sisters. They arrived in New York on September 4, 1906, settling in Cleveland, Ohio (his father Johann, a peddler, arrived earlier, on July 20, 1906). Rev. Nicholas Pfeil, pastor of St. Peter Church (Cleveland, Ohio) encouraged Joseph to consider a vocation. "The good old pastor in Cleveland -- I was an altar boy for him. He'd ask me what I was going to be... Just to please the old man, I'd say a priest." In 1911 after graduation from eighth grade, Joseph entered Pontifical College Josephinum in Columbus, Ohio. Before he completed his studies, his father died, leaving the family financially unstable and forcing Joseph to consider withdrawal from seminary. His two older sisters went to work as seamstresses to support the family and ensure his education at the seminary.

While at Pontifical College, Sunega became acquainted with Edward Joseph Hunkeler a fellow seminarian who told him of the wide open spaces and the fresh country air of Nebraska. The idea of a rural German-speaking community appealed to the young Sunega, who felt that Ohio was becoming too crowded. He decided to move west to Nebraska.

Sunega was ordained by the Most Reverend P. Fumasoni-Biondi, D.D., Apostolic Delegate to the United States, at the Pontifical College Josephinum on Monday, June 11, 1923. He offered his first solemn mass on Sunday, June 17, 1923, at St. Ignatius of Antioch church in Cleveland.

== Priesthood ==
A month after his ordination on June 11, 1923, Bishop Jeremiah James Harty appointed Suneg to St. Margaret Mary parish in Omaha; not the country setting he had hoped for. Established only four years earlier in 1919 (yet without a permanent church), the parish had been trying to pull itself out of its financial problems. Early in 1924, pastor Father Leo Patrick was transferred and Suneg was appointed administrator of the parish. Suneg chipped away steadily at the $60,000 debt. He lived frugally. He managed without an assistant, relying on part-time help first from the Jesuits at Creighton University and later from the Missionary Society of St. Columban.

When Suneg's mother Mary and sister Anna came to Omaha to keep house for him, the family purchased a home on the southeast corner of 50th and California Streets. This freed space in the former parish house, and Suneg remodeled the house to make another classroom on the first floor and a music room and lunch room for the nuns on the second floor. Whenever possible, Suneg saved the parish money by doing the work himself.

Suneg was known for his habits of thrift and reuse. Among the waste materials Suneg turned to ornamental purposes include iron grills once part of the George W. Lininger Art Museum, chandeliers from the Burlington Station (Omaha, Nebraska), and wooden slabs from a beer vat in the old Metz Brewery. Suneg described his thrift as a hobby and means of renewing interest in the rest of life's work: "Do not wait, therefore, until you have time to kill to follow your hobby. It will keep you mentally alert and physically fit. Your chosen life's work will not be a mere drudgery, a worrisome monotony. You will find renewed interest, enthusiasm and real joy in your daily occupation."

Suneg maintained a close working relationship with Fr. Edward Flanagan, founder of Boys Town, Nebraska, which was until 1953 located within the boundaries of St. Margaret Mary Parish. Fellow European immigrants, Fr. Flanagan had been ordained a priest at the University of Innsbruck in 1912 in Suneg's native land. As one documented example, Suneg worked closely with Fr. Flanagan on marriage arrangements to resolve the case of Japanese Americans Raymond Uchiyamada and Barbara Saneto who had been interred at Camp Manzanar in California during the Second World War. Fr. Flanagan secured release of a number of interred Japanese-Americans out of Camp Manzanar in exchange for employment at his home for boys near Omaha. With Saneto a parishioner of St. Margaret Mary, Suneg (as pastor) approved Fr. Flanagan's request for the Uchiyamada/Saneto wedding at Boys Town in a March 10, 1944 letter followed by Flangan's thank you reply in a letter on the very day of the ceremony, March 14, 1944.

== Building a parish ==
=== Groundwork ===
By 1926 the congregation had grown to eighty families and it was becoming evident that the temporary worship space above the school would soon be inadequate. Suneg began to plan for a new church even though the parish was deeply in debt. When six and a half acres became available near 62nd and Dodge Streets, Suneg saw it as the site of a new church. He wanted to buy the properties, but Bishop Joseph Rummel did not think so much land was necessary.

When Suneg was named pastor on April 20, 1928 the parish had expanded to nearly 200 families. As a result, the diocesan Board of Consultors proceeded to authorize the purchase of the Dodge Street property on June 4, 1929. Despite struggling through the effects of the Great Depression, the mortgage on the temporary church-school had been pared to $25,000 and the parishioners were supportive of their pastor. Suneg suggested it was time to start subscriptions to raise money for the new church. A letter from Bishop Rummel dated March 12, 1931, congratulated Suneg and the parish on the reduction of the debt. A new church committee was formed in May 1931.

=== Construction ===
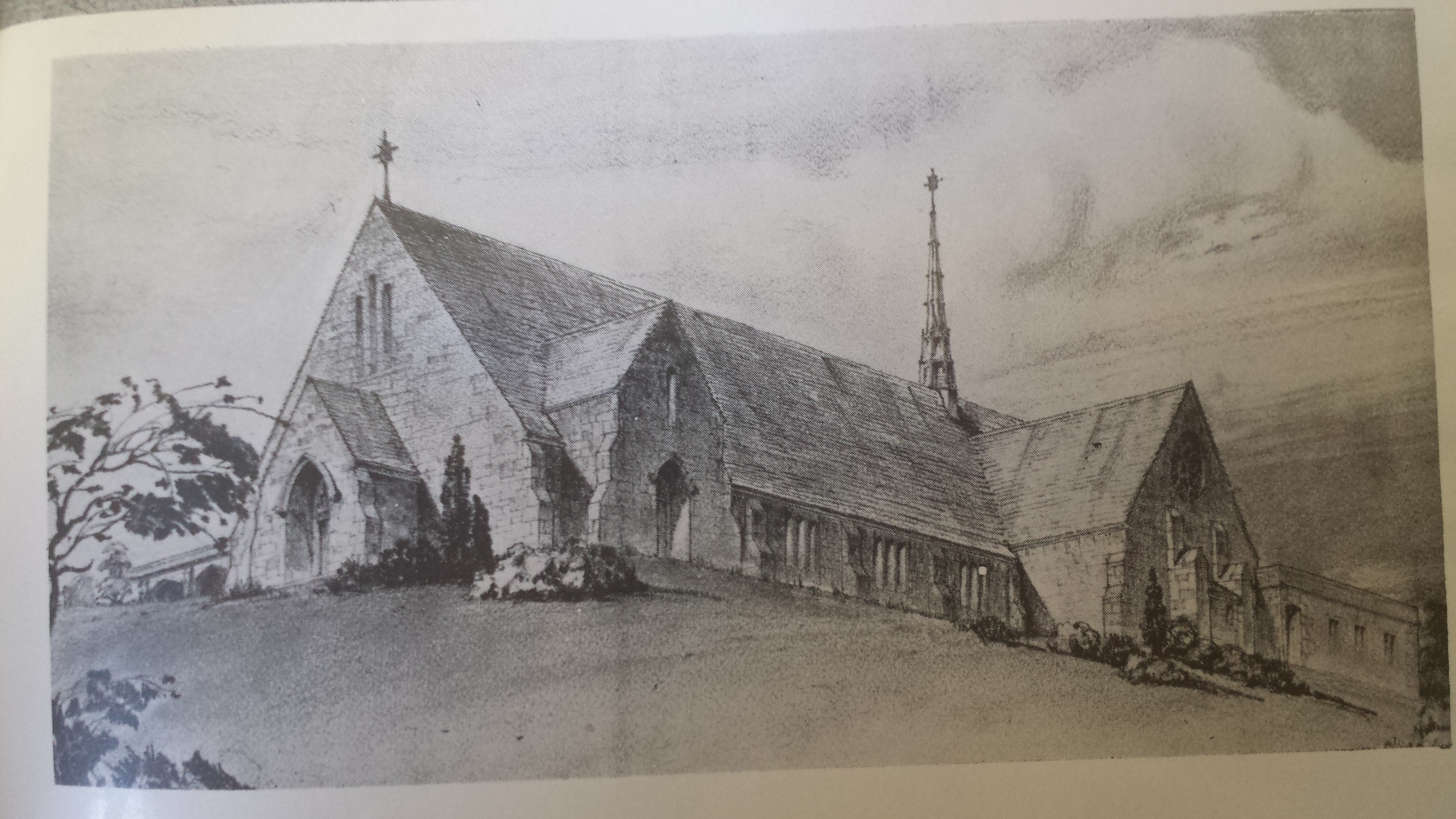
Leo A Daly architectural rendering, St. Margaret Mary Church, Omaha, 1941

After three design concepts, one of which was highlighted in a 1939 national architectural trade journal, and another for its innovative use of salvaged granite from the planned razing of the Old Post Office (Omaha, Nebraska), Suneg settled on an English Gothic architecture design with Early English Gothic period details such as a rusticated stone exterior, steep pitched roof, and open nave emphasizing horizontality, simple lines, and fine proportions. Charles Jay Connick of Boston designed the stained glass windows. The architect Leo A Daly was chosen and in May 1941 ground was broken. On Sunday, June 14, 1942 with 800 persons in attendance, Archbishop James Hugh Ryan dedicated the new church. The total cost of the building was approximately $150,000.

Throughout his tenure as pastor, Father Suneg's leadership and vision seamlessly balanced such historical continuity with evolving liturgical functionality. For example, original 1941 Pre-Vatican II interior layout design features such as the chancel sanctuary with high altar and altar rails have been retained with the addition of a versus populum altar installed by Msgr. Suneg in the mid 1960s from a modified console table. Other examples of Father Suneg's original handicraft included the hand-hammered copper front doors and the mosaic backdrop behind the Mary statue in the bell tower chapel.

Construction of the new school located to the east of the church was started in 1950 and completed by September 1951.

Next, a 112-foot bell tower (which had been eliminated from the original church blueprints) became a reality. At 4 p.m. on Sunday, January 6, 1963, Archbishop Gerald Thomas Bergan led the dedication of the Leo A Daly designed tower and the new chapel at its base. The $200,000 addition had been completed the previous spring. The chapel is a memorial to William Foxley and the tower a memorial to Daniel J. Gross. The tower holds four bells. Bells number 2 and 3 were cast by Petit & Fritsen of Holland and paid for by Dr. Joseph Pleiss as a memorial to his wife Ida M. Pleiss. Bells number 1 and 4 were cast by McShane Bell Foundry of Baltimore. The 6,052 lbs (tone B♭) McShane bell was acquired by Msgr. Suneg in 1962 from Immaculate Conception parish in Leavenworth, Kansas. It was commissioned in 1885 by the first bishop of the Diocese of Leavenworth, Louis Mary Fink O.S.B. as a gift to the recently constructed Cathedral of the Immaculate Conception, which stood on that site since 1868. By 1947, the Diocese of Leavenworth was suppressed and assumed into the larger Roman Catholic Archdiocese of Kansas City in Kansas. And following a 1961 fire that destroyed the Cathedral, the parish no longer needed the large bell when a new, smaller church was constructed. Msgr. Suneg paid $3,600 for the bell which was installed with the others in 1965.

Throughout his life, from his seminary days at the Josephinum through retirement at Marianna, Suneg was known for his native artistic ability and craftsmanship. St. Margaret Mary parish in Omaha today stands as a lasting memorial to his priestly zeal and artistry.

== Later years ==
In official recognition of his valuable service to the growth of the Catholic Church in Omaha, in 1957 Suneg was elevated to the title of Monsignor, a Domestic Prelate of Pope Pius XII.

In 1969 Suneg retired to Marianna—a wooded retreat of 160 acres he founded near Cedar Bluffs, Nebraska in the 1930s. He decided he would share his property with other retired priests throughout the country and invited interested priests to build homes at his country retreat.

Creighton University bestowed Suneg with the Honorary Alumnus Citation on January 29, 1970. He was recognized as the "father" of one of Omaha's largest parishes (1,500 families), having supervised the construction and development of both church and school from the ground up. During his tenure as pastor of St. Margaret Mary, Monsignor Suneg devoted many years of service to the Building Board of the Omaha Archdiocese. After 46 years of pastoral responsibilities, he continued to labor on behalf of the priests of the Archdiocese of Omaha.

Less than one year before his death, during a June 1988 interview looking back on his long and fruitful priesthood, Monsignor Suneg remarked, "The sacrifice of the mass is the biggest thing in my life. There is nothing else to take its place."

== Death ==
Monsignor Joseph A. Suneg died on Sunday, May 21, 1989 at Merrick Manor in Fremont, Nebraska. He was 91. Suneg had been hospitalized since November 1988. The apparent cause of death was congestive heart failure and pneumonia, said the Rev. Tom Magnuson, assistant pastor of St. Patrick Church in Fremont. He is interred at Holy Sepulchre Cemetery in Omaha.
