= St. Margaret Mary Church (Omaha) =

Church in Nebraska, United States

Coordinates: 41°15′39″N 96°00′27″W

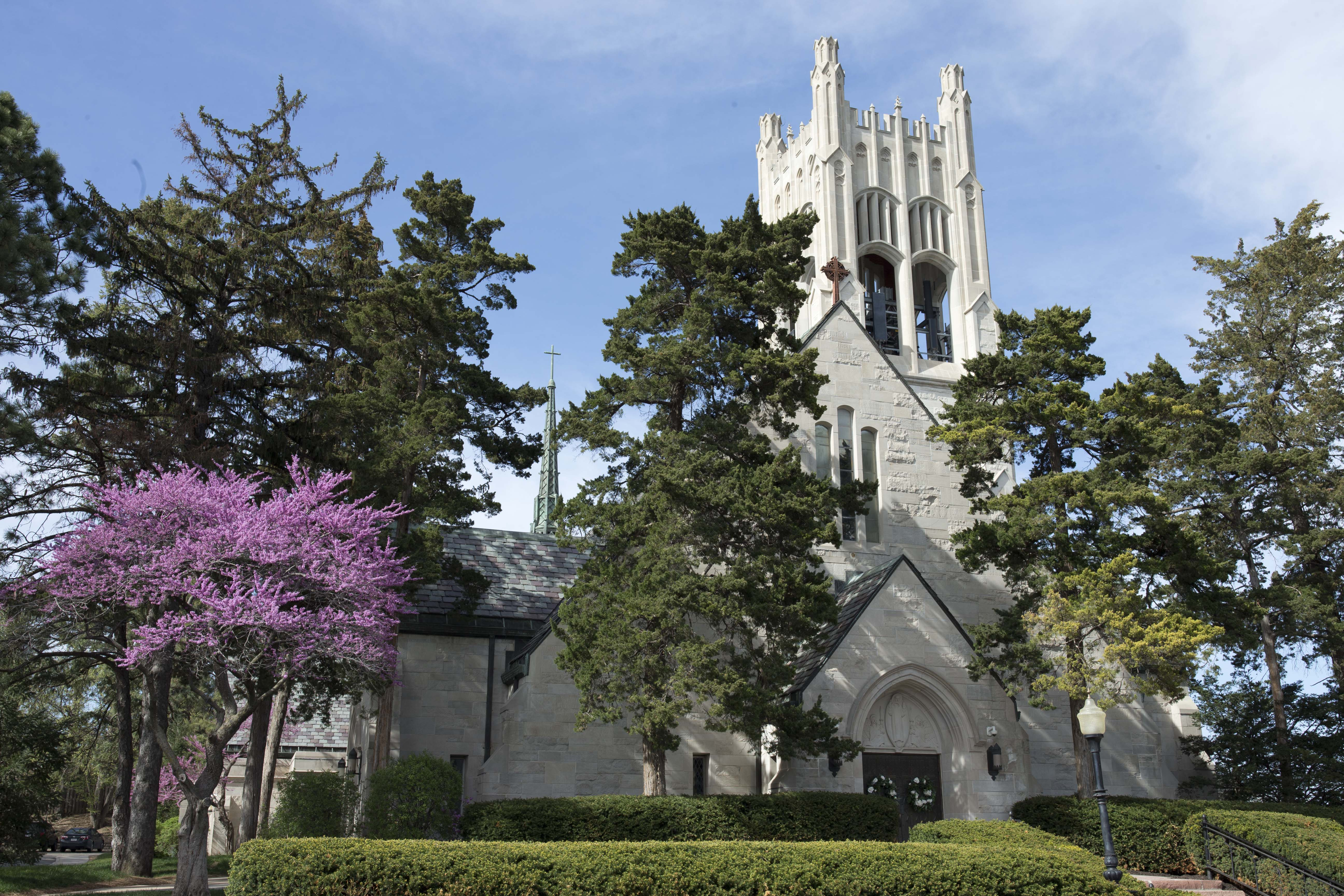
- St. Margaret Mary Church during springtime
- St. Margaret Mary Church
- Location: 6116 Dodge Street; Omaha, NE
- Country: United States
- Denomination: Roman Catholic Church
- Website: www.smmomaha.org

History
- Founded: 1919
- Dedicated: September 7, 1919

Architecture
- Architectural type: Rural English Gothic
- Completed: June 14, 1942
- Construction cost: $150,000

Specifications
- Capacity: 800
- Materials: Indiana limestone

Administration
- Diocese: Archdiocese of Omaha

Clergy
- Bishop: George Joseph Lucas

The St. Margaret Mary Church is a parish of the Catholic Church in Omaha, Nebraska, part of the Archdiocese of Omaha. The limestone church with High Gothic bell tower is prominently situated on a ridge overlooking Elmwood Creek along the original route of the Lincoln Highway, today known as U.S. Route 6 in the Fairacres Historic District. Adjacent to Memorial Park (Omaha) and the University of Nebraska Omaha it is widely known for its display of an enshrined relic of St Margaret Mary Alacoque, the French Catholic Visitation nun and mystic who promoted devotion to the Sacred Heart of Jesus.

== History ==
Jeremiah James Harty, bishop of Omaha, commissioned Fr. Leo Patrick to establish a parish in the Dundee area in 1919. He celebrated the first Mass at 8 am on Sunday, September 7, 1919, in the dance hall above Ernest Buffett’s (Warren Buffett’s grandfather) grocery store. The new parish remained unnamed until the canonization of St Margaret Mary Alacoque on Ascension Thursday, May 13, 1920, by Pope Benedict XV. On that same day, the bishop placed the young parish under this new saint's protection.

== Architecture ==
In 1941, Fr. Joseph A Suneg commissioned Leo A Daly, the firm whose many credits include the Cathedral of Our Lady of the Angels and the National World War II Memorial, to design the Rural English Gothic church. Parson's Construction Company began work the autumn before Japan’s attack on Pearl Harbor and just nine months later on June 14, 1942, the dedication mass was celebrated.

With a floorplan of 132' x 44′ the church has the same three-to-one proportions as Solomon's Temple in Jerusalem as well as the Sistine Chapel in Vatican City. In 1952, Italian artist Sirio Tonelli installed his reproduction of "The Frieze of the Prophets" by American portraitist John Singer Sargent on the sanctuary wall. The stained glass windows were designed by the famed Charles Jay Connick studio of Boston. In conformity with its Gothic character, a foliate disgorging Green Man adorns the north exterior wall beneath the rose window.

At least six other churches have been modeled after this Daly design including St Mary’s of Omaha, St Patrick’s of North Platte (NE), St Ann’s of Vail (IA), St Philip Neri of Omaha, St Paul’s Lutheran of West Allis (WI), and Cloister’s on the Platte of Gretna (NE).

In 1963, the iconic 112-foot-tall Leo A Daly-designed High Gothic bell tower was dedicated by Archbishop Gerald Thomas Bergan in memory of attorney Daniel J Gross. The belfry includes four bronze bells. The largest at 6,052 lbs. (tone “B flat”) was cast by the McShane Bell Foundry in 1885. It was salvaged from the Cathedral of the Immaculate Conception in the Roman Catholic Diocese of Leavenworth, Kansas, after a catastrophic fire in 1962.

In 2017, the former baptistery was converted into a Eucharistic Adoration chapel.

== Parish school ==
In 1920, the first classes were held in a parish house at 5002 California Street. By 1922 a new combination school/church was opened next door at 608 N 50th Street. It wasn't until 1951 that the school moved to its current location at 123 N 61st Street. Leo A Daly designed an edifice architecturally inspired by the Cotswolds region of central-southwest England. In 2008 it was recognized as a "National Blue Ribbon School Program" by the U.S. Department of Education.

== First-class relic ==
Inside the church, a first-class relic of St. Margaret Mary Alacoque is permanently ensconced in a reliquary at the base of the statue bearing her likeness. A March 26, 1955, document of authenticity signed by the Chaplain of the Visitation of St. Mary at Paray-le-Monial, Roman Catholic Diocese of Autun, France, certifies that “…authentic parcels of the ashes of St. Margaret Mary have been deposited and enshrined within a silver reliquary, adorned with a metal crown of thorns, round in shape, with a glass on its anterior face, closed with cords of red silk and sealed with the seal of the said monastery affixed once, on red wax of Spain.”

== Winter solstice ==
On December 21 each year at 7:46 am CST a winter solstice viewing takes place on the east lawn where the award-winning 1927 bronze statue of St. Francis of Assisi, entitled “The Canticle of the Sun” by Professor Arturo Tomagnini of Turin, aligns perfectly with the rising sun.

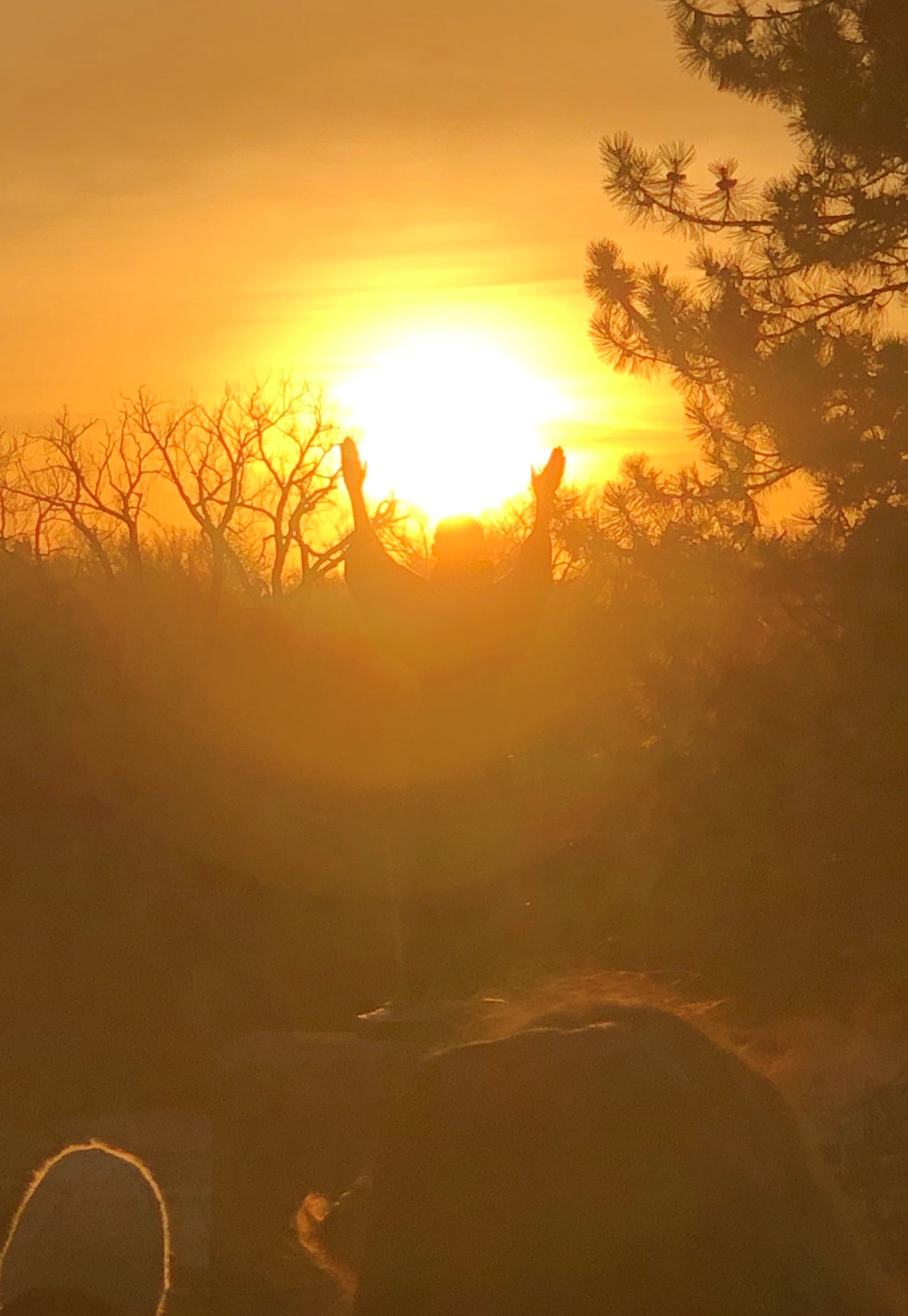
"From this hillside a sun was born into the world. Let him who wants to name this site correctly, not say Ascesi but Orient, if he would name it rightly.” (Dante - Canto 11 of Paradiso)
