= Central Catholic High School (West Point, Nebraska) =

Private coeducational school in West Point, Nebraska, United States

Location
- 419 East Decatur Street; West Point, (Cumming County), Nebraska 68788-1560; United States
- Coordinates: 41°50′34″N 96°42′28″W

Information
- Type: Private, coeducational
- Religious affiliation: Roman Catholic
- Principal: Kate E. Hagemann
- Grades: 9–12
- Colors: Blue and white
- Team name: Bluejays
- Accreditation: North Central Association of Colleges and Schools
- Website: westpointcentralcatholic.org

Central Catholic High School is a Roman Catholic high school in West Point, Nebraska, United States. It is located in the Roman Catholic Archdiocese of Omaha.

== Athletics ==
Central Catholic is a member of the Nebraska School Activities Association. The school has won the following NSAA State Championships:

- Girls' volleyball - 2001, 2002, 2003, 2004 (runner-up - 1999, 2006)
- Boys' basketball - 1998, 1999, 2010 (runner-up - 2003,2017)
- Girls' basketball - 2002, 2003, 2004, 2005 (runner-up - 2006), 2017
- Boys' football - 2010, (runner-up-2011,2017)
