= Archbishop Bergan High School =

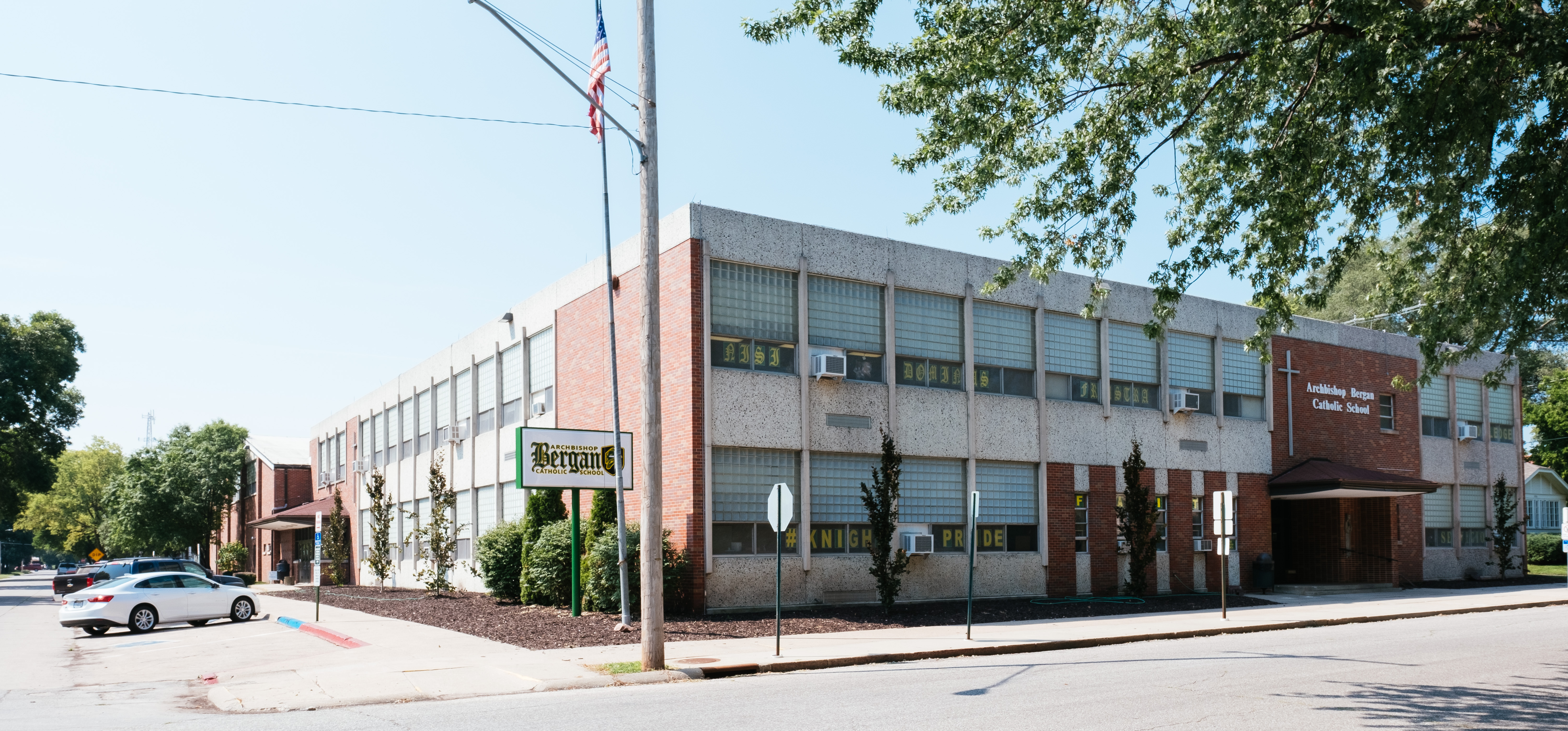

Location
- 545 East 4th Street; Fremont, (Dodge County), Nebraska; 68025-5105; United States; 41°25′56″N 96°29′30″W

Information
- Type: Private, coeducational
- Religious affiliation: Roman Catholic
- Established: 1950
- President: Fr. Walter Nolte
- Principal: Dan Koenig
- Grades: K–12
- Colors: Green and gold
- Team name: Knights
- Accreditation: North Central Association of Colleges and Schools
- Website: www.berganknights.org

Archbishop Bergan High School is a private, Roman Catholic high school in Fremont, Nebraska, United States. It is located in the Roman Catholic Archdiocese of Omaha.

== Background ==
Archbishop Bergan High School was established in 1950 as St. Patrick's High School. When the school relocated to its current location in 1960, it was renamed after Gerald Thomas Bergan, archbishop of the Omaha diocese from 1948 to 1969.

In 2010, a new building was constructed for the grade school, with Pre-K-6th grade at the new building, and 7-12th grades at the high school building.

== Activities ==
Archbishop Bergan is a member of the Nebraska School Activities Association and the Centennial Conference. The school has won the following NSAA State Championships:

- Boys' football - Champion: 1979, 2021
- Boys' basketball - Champion: 1979-80, 1986–87, 2007–08, 2013-14, 2024-25, 2025-26
- Boys' golf - Champion: 2009
- Girls' volleyball - Champion: 2018
- Girls' basketball - Champion: 2018-19

== Notable alumni ==
- Zach Wiegert, former football player in the NFL
