= Mercy High School (Omaha, Nebraska) =

Private all-girls school in Omaha, Nebraska, United States

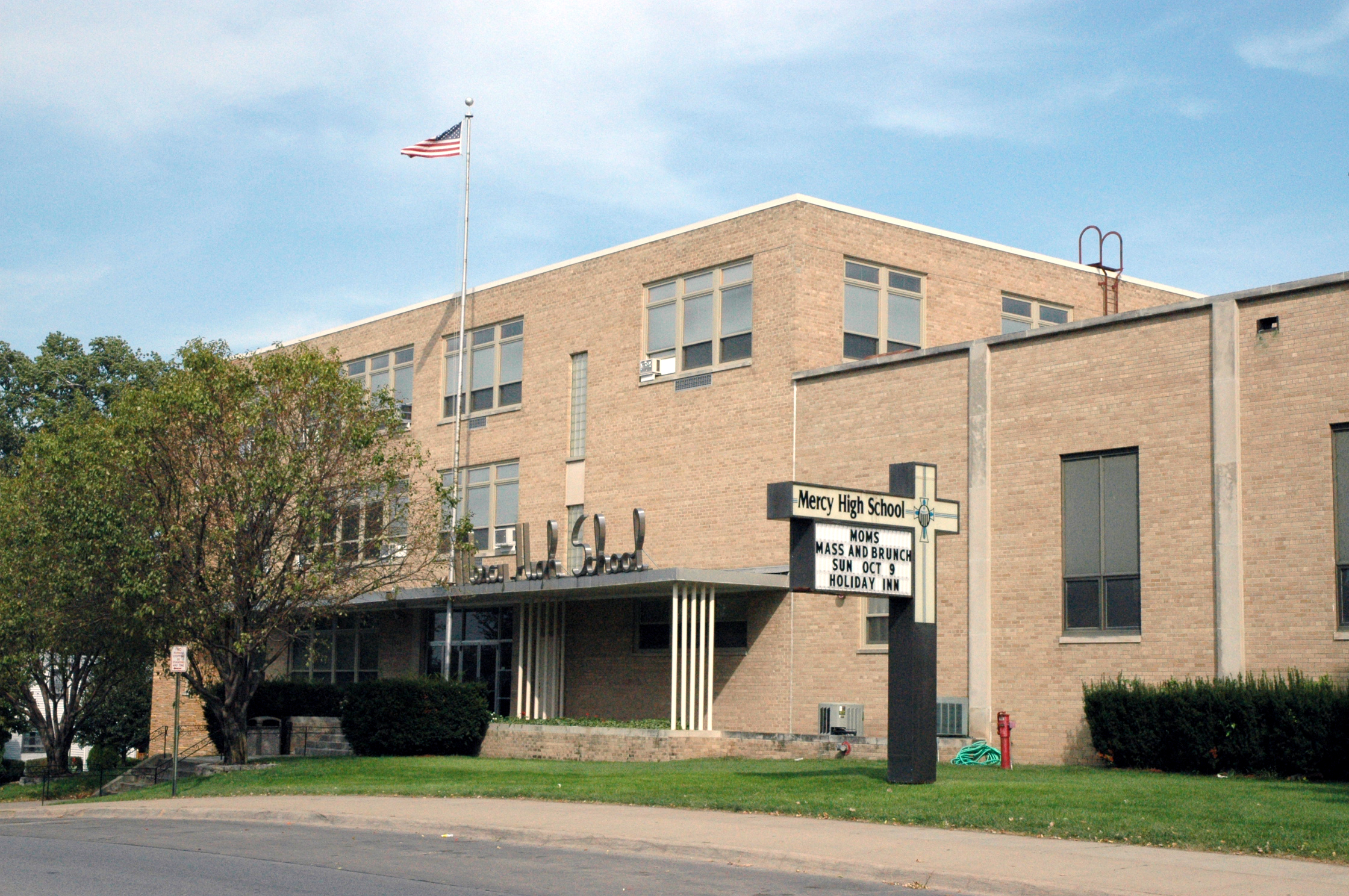

Location
- 1501 South 48th Street; Omaha, (Douglas County), Nebraska 68106-2504; United States
- 41°14′41″N 95°59′6″W

Information
- Type: Private, all-girls
- Motto: "Where Mercy Girls Become Women of Mercy"
- Religious affiliation: Roman Catholic
- Established: 1955
- Grades: 9–12
- Average class size: 19
- Student to teacher ratio: 13:1
- Colors: Blue and gold
- Team name: Monarchs
- Accreditation: North Central Association of Colleges and Schools
- Tuition: Negotiated
- Affiliation: Sisters of Mercy
- Website: www.mercyhigh.org

Mercy High School is a private, all-girls, Roman Catholic high school in Omaha, Nebraska, United States, sponsored by the Sisters of Mercy. It is located in the Roman Catholic Archdiocese of Omaha. Each family meets with the President at the start of 9th grade to agree upon what they will pay for tuition. Mercy has approximately 280 students, 27 percent of whom are minorities. 98 percent of the graduating class goes on to college.

== Background ==
Mercy High School is one of 41 high schools owned and operated by the Sisters of Mercy.

== Notable alumni ==
- Erin Bow, class of 1990: author

== Activities ==
Omaha Mercy is a member of the Nebraska School Activities Association. The school has won the following NSAA State Championships:

- Girls' volleyball – 1978
- Girls' basketball – none (runner-up 1981)
- Girls' soccer – none (runner-up 2007)
- Speech – none (runner-up 2009)
