= Elden Francis Curtiss =

American prelate of the Roman Catholic Church

His Excellency, The Most Reverend Elden Francis Curtiss
- Archbishop Emeritus of Omaha
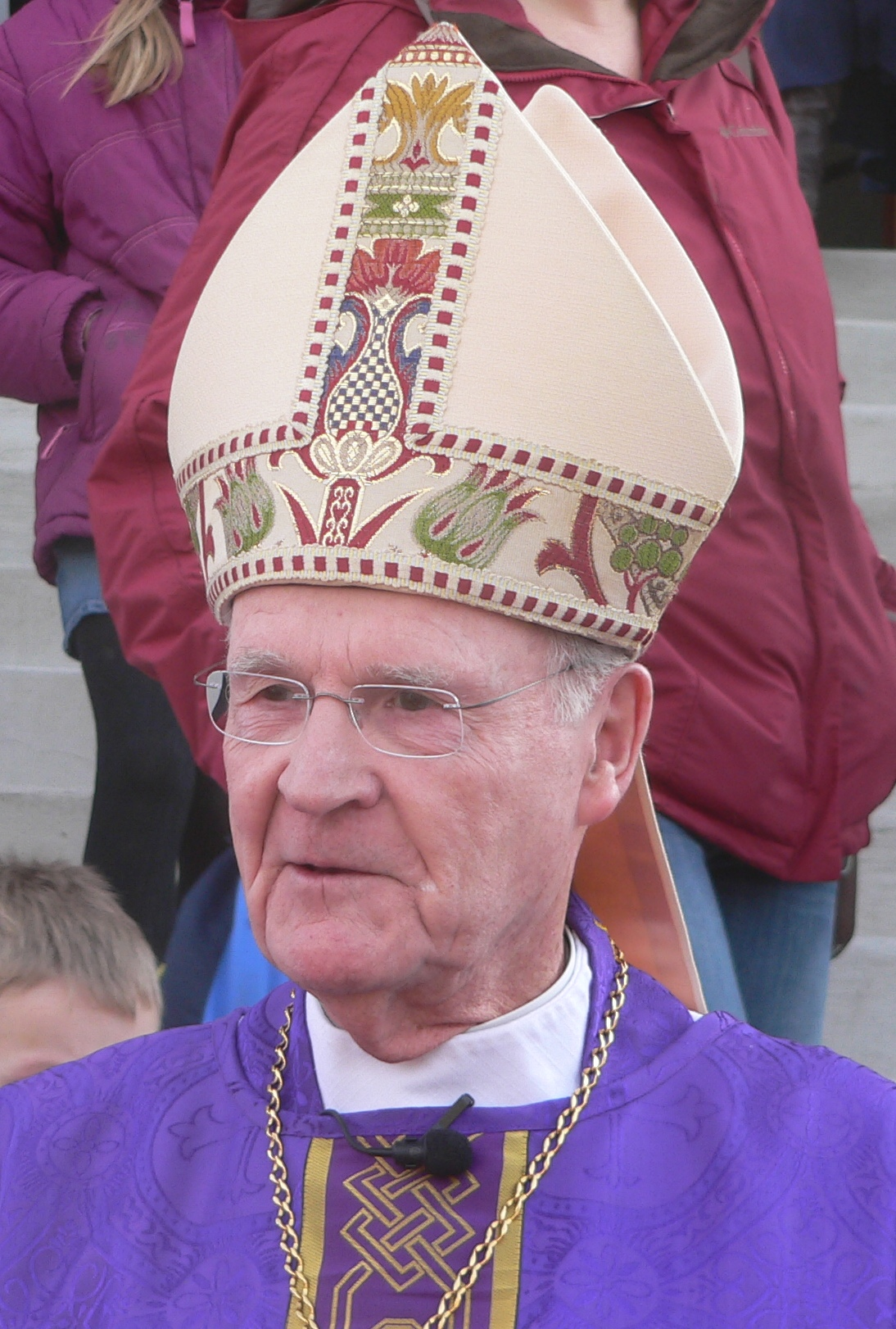
- Archbishop Curtiss in 2013
- Archdiocese: Omaha
- Appointed: May 4, 1993
- Installed: June 25, 1993
- Retired: June 3, 2009
- Predecessor: Daniel E. Sheehan
- Successor: George Joseph Lucas
- Previous post: Bishop of Helena (1976-1993)

Orders
- Ordination: May 24, 1958 by Francis Peter Leipzig
- Consecration: April 28, 1976 by Cornelius Michael Power, Thomas Joseph Connolly, and Francis Peter Leipzig

Personal details
- Born: June 16, 1932 (age 93) Baker City, Oregon, United States
- Denomination: Roman Catholic
- Education: Fordham University; University of Portland; University of Notre Dame
- Motto: That we may all be one

Styles of Elden Francis Curtiss
- Reference style: His Excellency; The Most Reverend
- Spoken style: Your Excellency
- Religious style: Archbishop

Elden Francis Curtiss (born June 16, 1932) is an American prelate of the Roman Catholic Church. He served as bishop of the Diocese of Helena in Montana from 1976 to 1993, and as archbishop of the Archdiocese of Omaha in Nebraska from 1993 to 2009.

== Biography ==
=== Early life ===
Elden Curtiss was born on June 16, 1932, in Baker City, Oregon, the eldest of four sons of Elden and Mary (née Neiger) Curtiss. He studied at St. Edward Seminary in Kenmore, Washington.

Curtiss was ordained to the priesthood at Saint Francis Cathedral in Baker City for the Diocese of Baker by Bishop Francis P. Leipzig on May 24, 1958. After his ordination, the diocese assigned Curtiss to parishes in Lakeview, La Grande, and Jordan Valley, Oregon, and served as a hospital chaplain.

Curtiss furthered his studies at Fordham University in New York City, at the University of Portland in Portland, Oregon, and at the University of Notre Dame in Notre Dame, Indiana, acquiring a Master of Divinity degree and a Master of Arts degree in education administration. Curtiss served as director of information and as superintendent of schools in the diocese. In 1970, he joined the faculty of Mount Angel Seminary in Saint Benedict, Oregon; in 1972, he was appointed president-rector of the seminary.

=== Bishop of Helena ===
On March 4, 1976, Curtiss was appointed as the seventh bishop of Helena by Pope Paul VI. He was consecrated on April 28, 1976, by Archbishop Cornelius Power. Curtiss selected as his episcopal motto: "That We May All Be One" (John 17:21).

=== Archbishop of Omaha ===
Curtiss was named the fourth archbishop of Omaha by Pope John Paul II on May 4, 1993. Succeeding the retiring Archbishop Daniel Sheehan, Curtiss was installed on June 25, 1993.

Curtiss led a capital campaign that funded a retirement home for priests and repairs to St. Cecilia Cathedral in Omaha. He was also able to subsidize tuition at Catholic high schools and increase the endowment for seminarians.

For the US Conference of Catholic Bishops (USCCB), Curtiss served as episcopal advisor to Serra International and as member of the Committee on Marriage and Family Life and the Ad Hoc Committee for the implementation of the National Strategy for Vocations. He was also a board member for the Catholic Church Extension Society and Kenrick-Glennon Seminary in Shrewsbury, Missouri.

During his tenure as bishop of Helena, Curtiss chose to reassign a priest who had been accused of pedophilia in 1959, later admitting that he had not properly examined the church's personnel file on the individual concerned. Curtiss faced similar criticism in 2001 in regard to a priest accused of accessing child pornography. Curtiss, it was alleged, had failed to bring the case to the attention of the authorities, and had chosen to send the priest for counseling and to reassign the priest, removing him from his high-school teaching position but reassigning him to a middle school.

=== Retirement and legacy ===
Upon reaching his 75th birthday in 2007, Curtiss submitted his resignation as archbishop of Omaha to the Vatican, as required by church law. In 2009, Pope Benedict XVI accepted his resignation and named Bishop George J. Lucas as his successor.

In 2009, Curtiss stated that the bishops had "learned the hard way", but that the church was better now that it had gone through the process of responding to the sexual abuse issues.

== See also ==
- Catholic Church hierarchy
- Catholic Church in the United States
- Historical list of the Catholic bishops of the United States
- List of Catholic bishops of the United States
- Lists of patriarchs, archbishops, and bishops

== Episcopal succession ==
Catholic Church titles
Preceded by Raymond Gerhardt Hunthausen	Bishop of Helena; 1976–1993	Succeeded by Alexander Joseph Brunett
Preceded by Daniel Eugene Sheehan	Archbishop of Omaha; 1993–2009	Succeeded by George Joseph Lucas
