= Cedar Catholic High School =

Private coeducational school in Hartington, Cedar County, Nebraska, United States

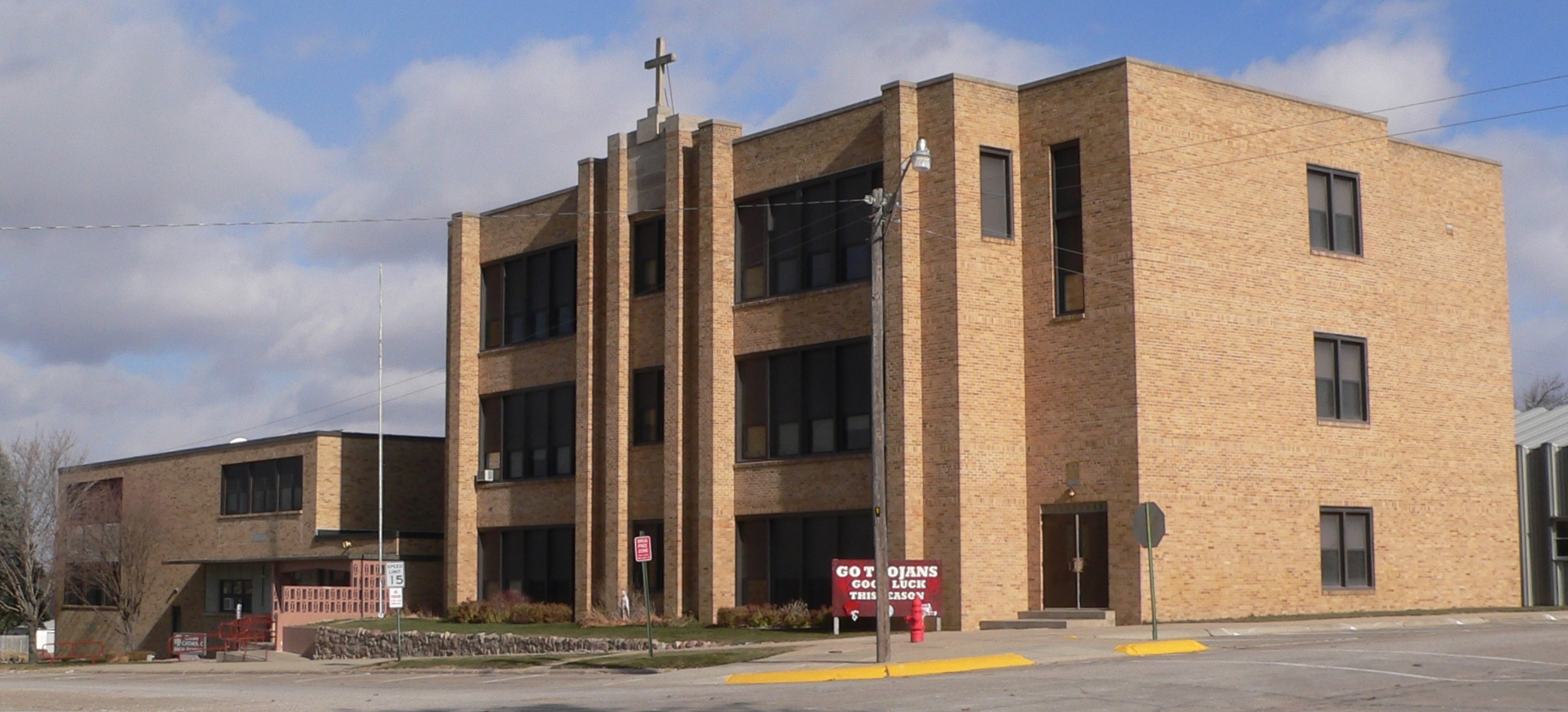

Location
- 401 South Broadway; Hartington, Cedar County, Nebraska 68739; United States; 42°36′59″N 97°15′53″W

Information
- Type: Private, coeducational
- Religious affiliation: Roman Catholic
- Established: 1901
- Teaching staff: 16.1 (on an FTE basis)
- Grades: 7–12
- Student to teacher ratio: 11.2
- Colors: Red and white
- Fight song: Washington and Lee Swing
- Mascot: Trojans
- Team name: Trojans
- Website: www.cedarcatholic.org

Cedar Catholic High School is a private, Roman Catholic high school in Hartington, Nebraska, United States. It is located in the Roman Catholic Archdiocese of Omaha.

== History ==
The school was founded in 1901 as Holy Trinity School, established by Holy Trinity Catholic Church in Hartington, NE. In the 1963 at the direction of Archbishop Gerald T. Bergan, Cedar Catholic High School was established as a central high school and supported by ten Catholic parishes in Cedar County, Nebraska. The elementary Catholic school in Hartington, NE retains the Holy Trinity name.

== Athletics ==
Cedar Catholic is a member of the Nebraska School Activities Association. The school has won the following NSAA state championships:

- Boys' basketball—1980, 1984
- Boys' golf—1995, 2005, 2009
- Girls' volleyball—1989, 2012, 2022
- Girls' basketball—1986
- Boys' bowling—2012

== Notable alumni ==
- Russ Hochstein, NFL player for the Denver Broncos, former player for the Nebraska Cornhuskers; two-time Super Bowl Champion with the New England Patriots (XXXVIII, XXXIX)
- Charles Thone, US Representative 1971–79, governor of Nebraska 1979-83
