= Pasi Organ Builders =

Organ manufacturer and restorer

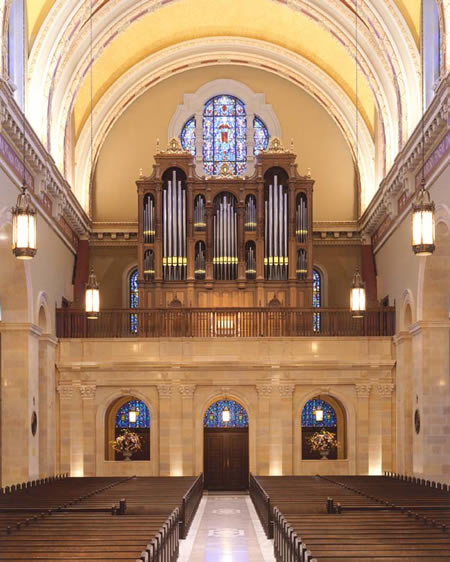
The Pasi Organ Opus 14 at St. Cecilia Cathedral in Omaha, Nebraska

Pasi Organ Builders, based in Roy, WA, manufactures mechanical action organs and restores historic instruments. Martin Pasi received his first formal experience in organ building during a four-year apprenticeship with the Rieger Company in his native Austria. After working in Austria and in the United States, Pasi set up his own studio, Pasi Organ Builders, in 1990 in a former school building in Roy, Wash.

Pasi's organs, although historically informed, tend to be less dogmatic in their visual design than those of his contemporaries. Earlier instruments, such as Opus 2 (Redmond, WA) follow traditional German casework patterns, while later examples, especially Opus 15 (Chicago, IL) and Opus 17 (Solebury, PA), feature radical visual designs. Overall, Pasi's cases are highly eclectic and, at the same time, very traditional in their proportions and construction techniques.

Pasi first achieved notability with his Opus 4, a two-manual instrument in Lynnwood, WA completed in 1995. In particular, the instrument stands out for its gentle voicing and use of historical Italian organs as models for both pipe construction and visual design. Pasi's familiarity with European organs stems both from his Austrian nativity and restoration work on several instruments, including two Italian chamber organs. Historical influences are especially evident in his Opus 14, a 55 stop dual temperament organ at St. Cecilia Cathedral in Omaha, Nebraska. This instrument is one of only a few in the world with the ability to play in both meantone and well-tempered tuning systems.

The idea of a dual-temperament organ for Saint Cecilia Cathedral developed in early conversations between organ builder Martin Pasi and cathedral organist and music director Kevin Vogt, and was inspired by the dual-temperament organs at Stanford University (C.B. Fisk, Op. 85) and the Wegscheider organs at the Allstedt Schloßkapelle (Op. 1) and Dresden-Wilschdorf (Op. 21). While the two temperaments of the Stanford Fisk are made possible by five extra pipes per octave, and the smaller Wegscheider organs boast six extra pipes per octave, 29 stops of Pasi Op. 14, contain eight extra notes per octave, tipping the scale of the concept from a single organ with extra pipes to the equivalent of two organs which share a third of their pipes. The abundance of extra pipes allows the circulating temperament to accommodate much of the Romantic and modern repertoires, while retaining enough key color to bring Baroque music alive and to lock into tune the mixtures and reeds in the best keys.

Following the completion of over 30 organs, Martin Pasi died on September 6, 2026.

== Bibliography ==
- Schnurr, Stephen J., Northway, Dennis Edward. Pipe organs of Chicago, Volume 1. (Chauncey Park Press, 2005)
- Kassel, Richard, The Organ: an Encyclopedia (Taylor & Francis Group, 2006).
- Vogt, Kevin Christopher, THE EMBODIMENT OF HARMONY: A History of Organs in the Roman Catholic Cathedrals of Omaha Culminating in an Organ by Martin Pasi With Two Temperaments (2007)
- Schnurr, Stephen J., Northway, Dennis Edward. Pipe organs of Chicago, Volume 2. (Chauncey Park Press, 2009)

== Discography ==
Bach, Improvisation and the Liturgical Year. Trinity Lutheran Church, Lynnwood, WA. Pamela Ruiter-Feenstra, Organist. rzcd-5016.

Craig Cramer on the Pasi Organ. Craig Cramer, Organist. Dulcian Productions.

Aaron David Miller Plays J.S.Bach, Sweelinck, Mendelssohn and Improvises on the Pasi Organ. Aaron David Miller, Organist. Dulcian Productions.

BUXTEHUDE: Organ Works, Vol. 5, St. Cecilia Cathedral, Omaha, Nebraska. Julia Brown, Organist. Naxos Catalogue No: 8.557555

BUXTEHUDE: Organ Works, Vol. 6, St. Cecilia Cathedral, Omaha, Nebraska. Julia Brown, Organist. Naxos Catalogue No: 8.570311

BUXTEHUDE: Organ Works, Vol. 7, St. Cecilia Cathedral, Omaha, Nebraska. Julia Brown, Organist. Naxos Catalogue No: 8.570312

George Ritchie Plays J. S. Bach, Volume 6 St. Cecilia Cathedral, Omaha, Nebraska. George Ritchie, Organist. Raven OAR-740
