= Old Post Office (Omaha, Nebraska) =

U.S. post office 1898-1966

Coordinates: 41.25986°N 95.93729°W

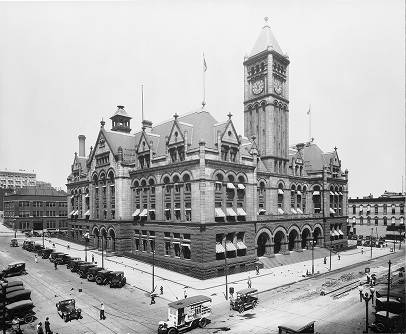
- The Old Post Office in 1921.
- Interactive map of the Old Post Office area

General information
- Architectural style: Richardson Romanesque
- Location: Omaha, Nebraska, United States
- Construction started: 1898
- Completed: 1906
- Demolished: 1966
- Cost: $2,000,000
- Client: United States Postal Service

Design and construction
- Architect: John Latenser, Sr.
- Engineer: O.J. King

The Old Post Office was located at 16th and Dodge Streets in Omaha, Nebraska. Built in 1898, the building was demolished in 1966. During the process of being demolished, the building, along with the Old City Hall, became a rallying force for historic preservation in Omaha.

== About ==
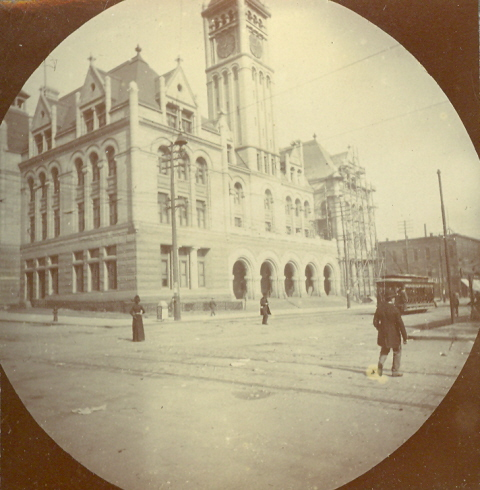
A 1900 street scene including the Old Post Office.

The Old Post Office began construction in 1892 with $1.2 million in appropriations from the federal government. The outside of the building was covered with St. Cloud pink granite on the first story; on the next three floors sandstone was used. Polished granite columns held up stone archways on each of the five entrances, and on the east side was the main entrance. It was capped with a 190-foot (58 m) clock tower, with clocks on all four sides. A copper roof covered the entire building, except for the atrium court in the center, which was covered by a 100-foot (30 m)-square skylight. In the early years the building was identified as "The Custom House".

A formal opening was held in 1898; however, because of delays the building was not completely finished until 1906. The building was first identified for demolition by Omaha's civic leaders in the 1930s, who thought of it as an eyesore in a modern metropolitan city. Additionally, they believed that the prime commercial real estate it sat on could be better utilized.

In the early 1960s the General Services Administration declared the building too costly to maintain and quickly built a new facility. Despite several suggested plans to renovate the facility, First National Bank of Omaha demolished the building in 1966. One innovative idea was suggested by Joseph A. Suneg as early as February 12, 1939. He was planning a design for a new Catholic church at 62nd and Dodge Street and proposed salvaging the granite blocks. They would be marked, stored and later reconstructed into a church patterned after the post office.

More than 50 years after the building was razed, Douglas County Historical Society created the Ethel C. Flannigan Memorial Architectural Garden that showcases four granite pieces salvaged from the 1898 structure.

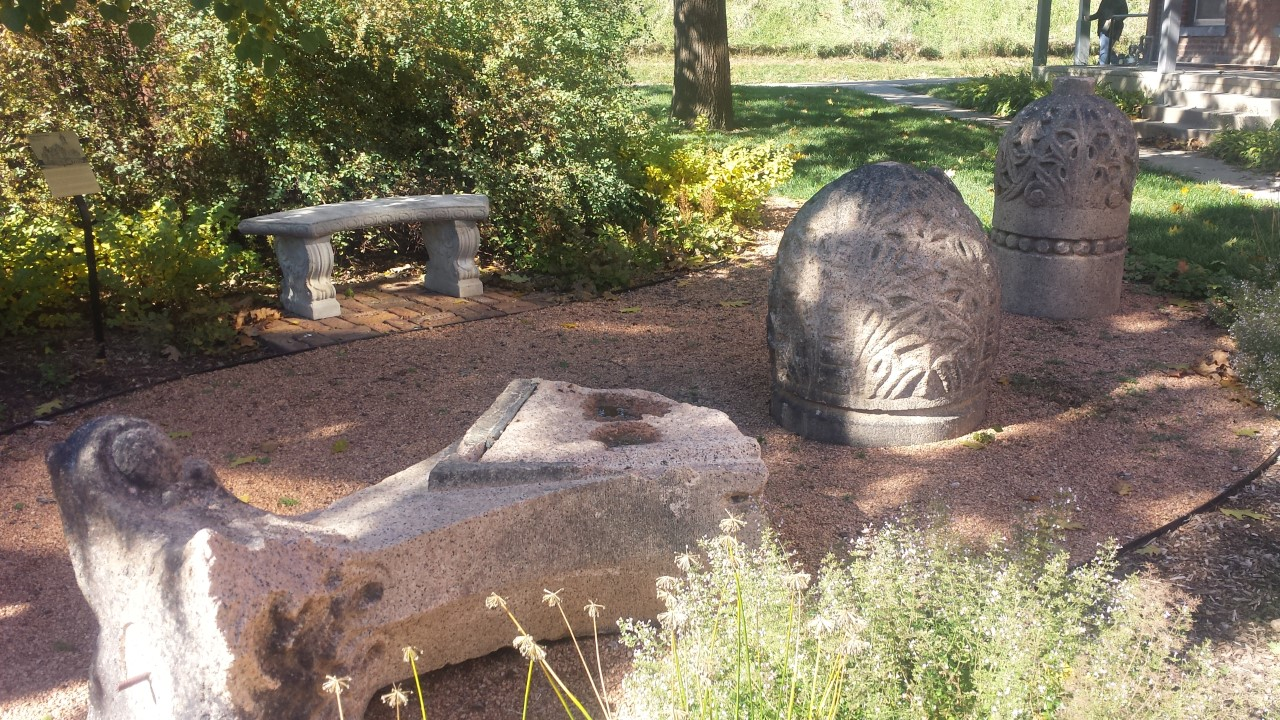
Granite architectural elements salvaged from the Old Post Office (Omaha)

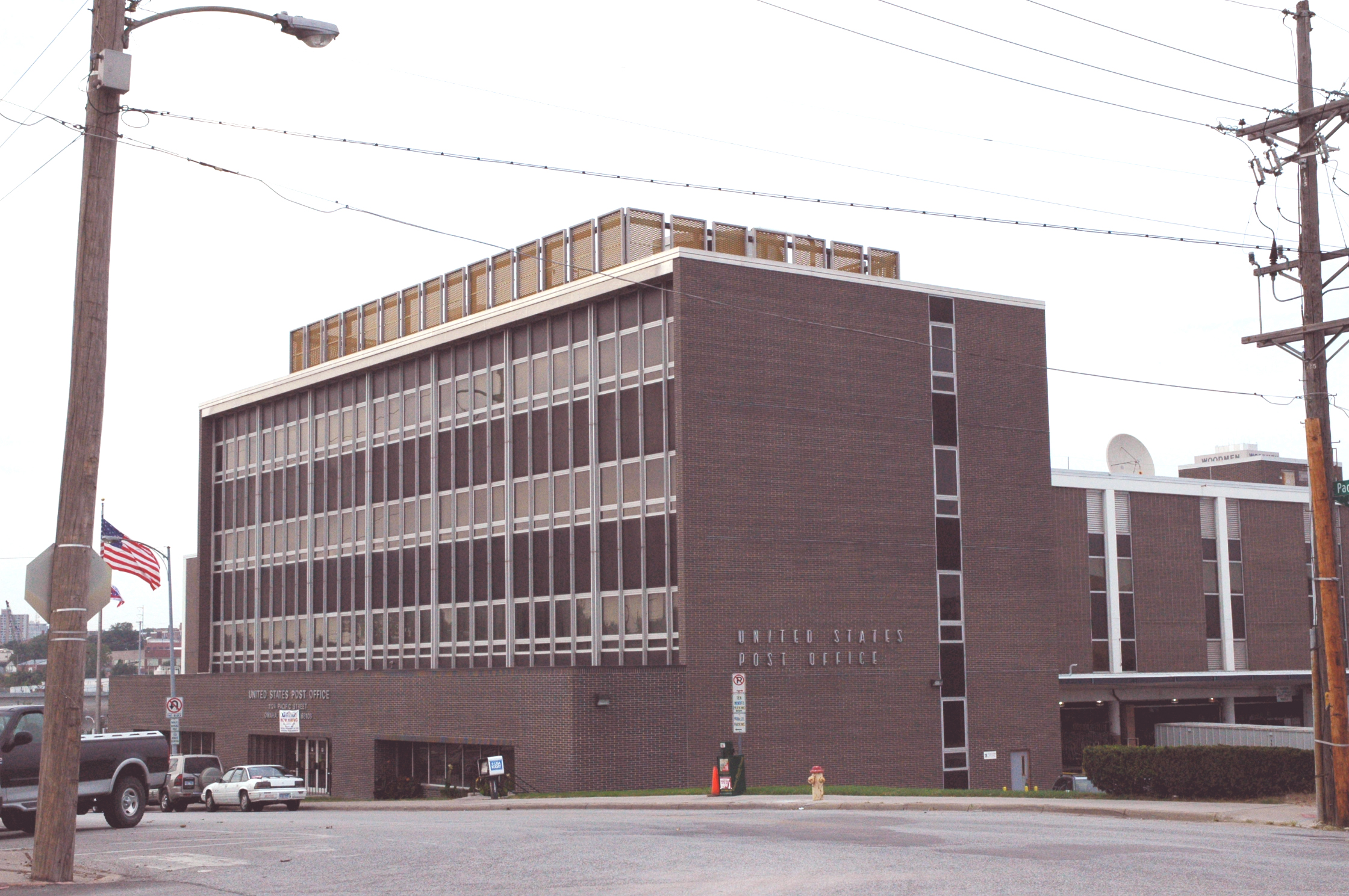
The new post office in Omaha.

In 1966 the City of Omaha approved a plan for First National Bank to build an office tower and adjoining high-rise Hilton Hotel complex on the site of the Old Post Office. The City allowed the new buildings to be built on 16th Street which effectively blocked the main north-south street connecting the downtown commercial district with the adjacent North Omaha area. Critics charged that the closure of 16th Street was a heavy-handed attempt to inhibit the flow of blacks from the predominantly African-American North Omaha at a time of a fear of rising social unrest and riots nationwide.

== Legacy ==
Landmarks, Inc., was organized in 1965 because of concern for the imminent demolition of the Old Post Office. The group has organized the Omaha community around saving the city's landmarks.

== See also ==
- History of Omaha
- Downtown Omaha
