= Marian High School (Nebraska) =

Location
- 7400 Military Avenue; Omaha, (Douglas County), Nebraska 68134; United States; 41°18′0″N 96°1′40″W

Information
- Type: Private, all-girls
- Religious affiliations: Roman Catholic, Servants of Mary
- Established: 1955
- President: Michele Ernst
- Principal: Susan Sullivan
- Grades: 9–12
- Enrollment: 700 (2016-2017)
- Colors: Royal blue and white
- Team name: Crusaders
- Accreditation: North Central Association of Colleges and Schools
- Website: marianhighschool.net

Marian High School is a private, Catholic college preparatory school for young women located in Omaha, Nebraska, United States. It is located in the Roman Catholic Archdiocese of Omaha. Marian was founded in 1955 by the Servants of Mary. Its 23-acre (93,000 m^{2}) campus is located in the north central portion of Omaha, near the junction of Military Avenue and 72nd Street.

Marian has won the U.S. Department of Education Blue Ribbon Award for Academic Excellence twice. It is the only Class A, North Central accredited college preparatory high school in the state of Nebraska for girls. The school's athletic teams are known as the Crusaders.

== Academics ==
Academic focus areas include science, math, languages, fine arts, social studies and religion. Marian has been a North Central Accredited college preparatory school for almost two decades. There are 37 honors courses, ten advanced placement courses and ten dual enrollment classes that allow students to proceed at a more rapid pace and/or to approach subjects in more depth. Marian is a Catholic school sponsored by the Servants of Mary and warmly welcomes students of all religious, cultural and economic backgrounds.

Marian High School is a member of:

- The National Catholic Educational Association (NCEA)
- The National Association of Secondary School Principals (NASSP)
- The Association for Supervision and Curriculum Development (ASCD)
- Women's Schools Together (WST)
- The Nebraska School Activities Association (NSAA)

Marian is accredited by the State of Nebraska and the North Central Association Commission on Accreditation NCA as a college preparatory school.

== Student activities and events ==
Marian High School provides numerous clubs, sports, and activities for involvement outside of the classroom.

=== Athletics ===
Marian's athletic program consists of nine Class A state-sanctioned sports: volleyball, cross country, softball, golf, basketball, track & field, swimming & diving, tennis and soccer. They have won 71 state championships in eight sports since the Nebraska School Activities Association began sanctioning girls' sports in 1971.

=== State championships ===
State championships
Season	Sport	Number of championships	Year
Fall	Cross country	7	1998, 1999, 2003, 2004, 2005, 2006, 2007
Fall	Softball	2	2015, 2022
Fall	Volleyball	8	1972, 1983, 1999, 2009, 2013, 2014, 2015, 2017
Fall	Golf	11	1974, 1975, 1985, 1986, 1989, 2005, 2006, 2007, 2008, 2009, 2010
Winter	Basketball	3	1985, 2000, 2001
Winter	Swimming	16	1973, 1980–81, 1982, 1998, 2000, 2001, 2002, 2003, 2004, 2005, 2006, 2007, 2015, 2020, 2021, 2023
Spring	Soccer	14	1989, 1990, 1996, 1998, 1999, 2000, 2001, 2002, 2003, 2010, 2012, 2014, 2016, 2017
Spring	Tennis	7	1976, 2006, 2008, 2009, 2010, 2011, 2013
Spring	Track & field	0	
Total		68	

=== Walk-a-Thon ===
The Walk-A-Thon is an all-student facilitated fundraiser for the school. Participating students are responsible for collecting pledges from the community. Each student walks a certain mileage with their class based on the amount of money their class collected, on the day of Walk-A-Thon. The winner gets to pick color and field day theme first, in order of placement in the Walk-A-Thon.

=== Surprise Day ===
Surprise Day is an event planned each year by the Student Board, usually occurring early in the second semester. It involves a half-day of games and entertainment instead of scheduled classes. Students do not find out the date of Surprise Day until lunch on Surprise Day when a special announcement is made that lets students know their remaining classes for the day have been canceled and what activities they can expect. In recent years, bouncy castles, therapy dogs, face painting, and massage chairs have all been featured in the Surprise Day events.

=== gnimocemoH ===
gnimocemoH, which is "homecoming" spelled backwards, is Marian's approach to homecoming. Instead of a football game, Marian hosts a spirited faculty-versus-student volleyball game. Later that evening, students attend an informal dance where they don wacky attire and crown the neeuQ (Queen), usually known as Marian's most spirited student. The gnimocemoH dance is planned and executed by the Senior Class Officers: the student government board for the eldest class of students in the school.

=== Field Day ===
Field Day is held on the last Friday in April and is Marian's largest event of the year. Students spend the week leading up to Field Day making costumes, decorating PVC structures in an event called Walls, building mascots, learning songs, developing skits, and perfecting routines, all in anticipation of winning the coveted Field Day trophy. Students work with their graduating class and compete against the other grade years. During Field Week, building begins Monday at noon and all work must be completed by 4 p.m. Thursday. Each class picks two colors and a theme during Color Block several weeks prior to Field Day and is limited to those colors when creating all of their materials.

In early iterations of the competition, students would decorate the school's hallways (rather than PVC structures) for Walls Night. This was stopped by the local fire department for its potential fire hazards. Additionally, early versions of the competition also included a parade where students would build floats with their peers.
