= Russ Hochstein =

American football player (born 1977)

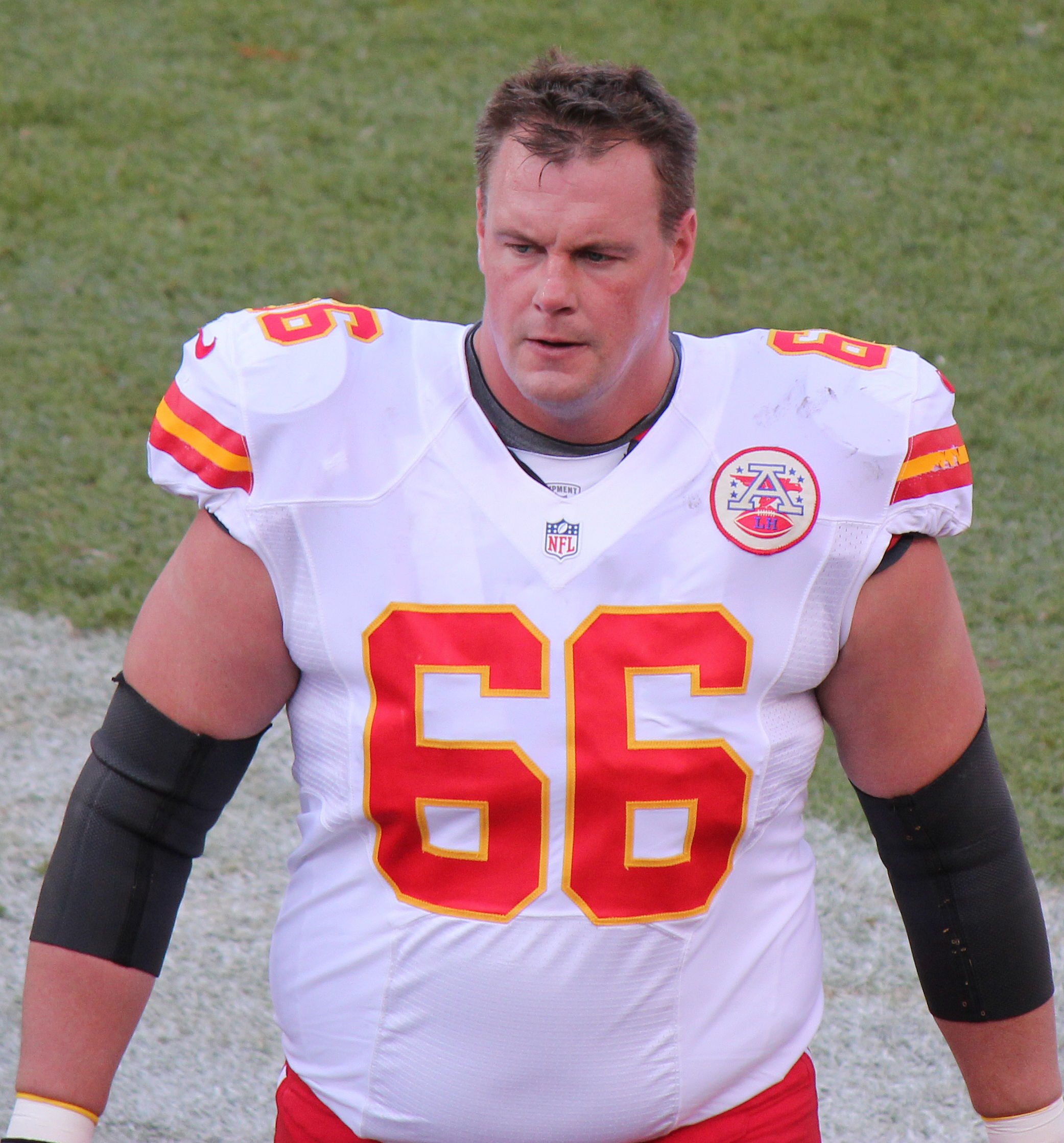
- Hochstein with the Kansas City Chiefs in 2012

No. 65, 71, 66
- Position: Center

Personal information
- Born: October 7, 1977 (age 49); Hartington, Nebraska, U.S.
- Listed height: 6 ft 4 in (1.93 m)
- Listed weight: 300 lb (136 kg)

Career information
- High school: Cedar Catholic (Hartington)
- College: Nebraska (1996–2000)
- NFL draft: 2001: 5th round, 151st overall pick

Career history
- Tampa Bay Buccaneers (2001–2002); New England Patriots (2002–2008); Denver Broncos (2009–2011); Arizona Cardinals (2012)*; Kansas City Chiefs (2012)
- * Offseason or practice squad member only

Awards and highlights
- 2× Super Bowl champion (XXXVIII, XXXIX); National champion (1997); First-team All-American (2000); 2× Second-team All-Big 12 (1999, 2000)

Career NFL statistics
- Games played: 149
- Games started: 37
- Fumble recoveries: 1
- Stats at Pro Football Reference

Russ Hochstein (born October 7, 1977) is an American former professional football player who was a center in the National Football League (NFL). After playing college football for the Nebraska Cornhuskers, he was selected by the Tampa Bay Buccaneers in the fifth round of the 2001 NFL draft. He played for the Buccaneers for two seasons from 2001 to 2002 (but was released in 2002 before the team won the Super Bowl), the New England Patriots for seven seasons from 2002 to 2008 (earning two Super Bowl rings with the team), and the Denver Broncos for three seasons from 2009 to 2011.

== Early life ==
Hochstein was born in Hartington, Nebraska and is a graduate of Cedar Catholic High School, where he was an award-winning performer in school plays, and a letterman in football, basketball, and track and field. In football, he played the offensive line, defensive line and middle linebacker positions, and finished his high school career with 18 sacks, 309 tackles, eight fumble recoveries, and two interceptions.

== Professional career ==
=== Tampa Bay Buccaneers ===
Hochstein was selected by the Tampa Bay Buccaneers in the fifth round of the 2001 NFL draft.

=== New England Patriots ===
Hochstein signed with the New England Patriots in 2002. He started in 2003 after Damien Woody (who had moved from Center to fill in for the injured Mike Compton) was injured in the first round of the playoffs. After Damien Woody left for Detroit in the 2004 offseason, Hochstein started the first two games of the 2004 season before filling in at Tight end, offensive tackle and Fullback in the remaining regular season games and Super Bowl XXXIX. Hochstein started the final seven games of the 2005 season at center when Dan Koppen was injured and started a career high eight games in 2007 at center and right guard for the New England Patriots. He remained a special teams contributor and first choice backup interior offensive lineman.

=== Denver Broncos ===
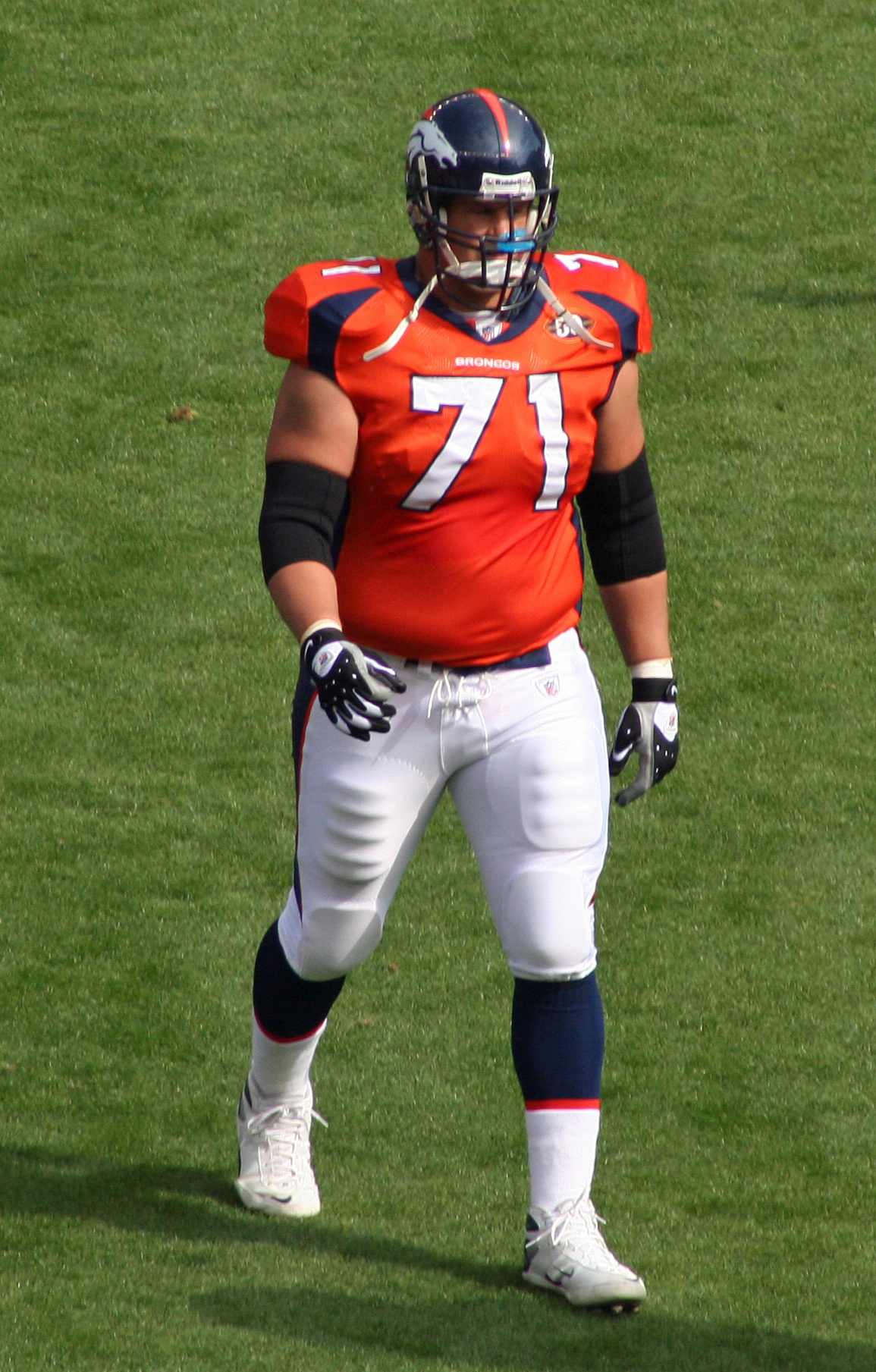
Hochstein while with the Denver Broncos.

Hochstein was traded to the Denver Broncos in exchange for a seventh-round selection (which the Patriots had sent with Le Kevin Smith in a prior trade) in the 2010 NFL draft on August 25, 2009. The move reunited Hochstein with Broncos head coach and former Patriots offensive coordinator Josh McDaniels.

Hochstein started 10 of the 15 games in which he played for the Broncos in 2009. He was placed on season-ending injured reserve with a knee injury on December 28. He was re-signed by the Broncos on March 5, 2010.

=== Arizona Cardinals ===
On July 26, 2012, Hochstein signed a one-year contract with the Arizona Cardinals. He was released during the final cutdown period.

=== Kansas City Chiefs ===
The Kansas City Chiefs signed Hochstein on September 25, 2012.
