= Wegscheider =

Wegscheider is a surname. Notable people with the surname include:

- Julius Wegscheider (1771–1849), German theologian
- Kurt-Curry Wegscheider (born 2001), Central African basketball player
- Rudolf Wegscheider (1859–1935), Austrian chemist
- Kristian Wegscheider (born 1954), german organ builder
