= Archdiocese of Omaha =

Latin Catholic jurisdiction in Nebraska, United States

Archdiocese of Omaha Archidioecesis Omahensis

Catholic
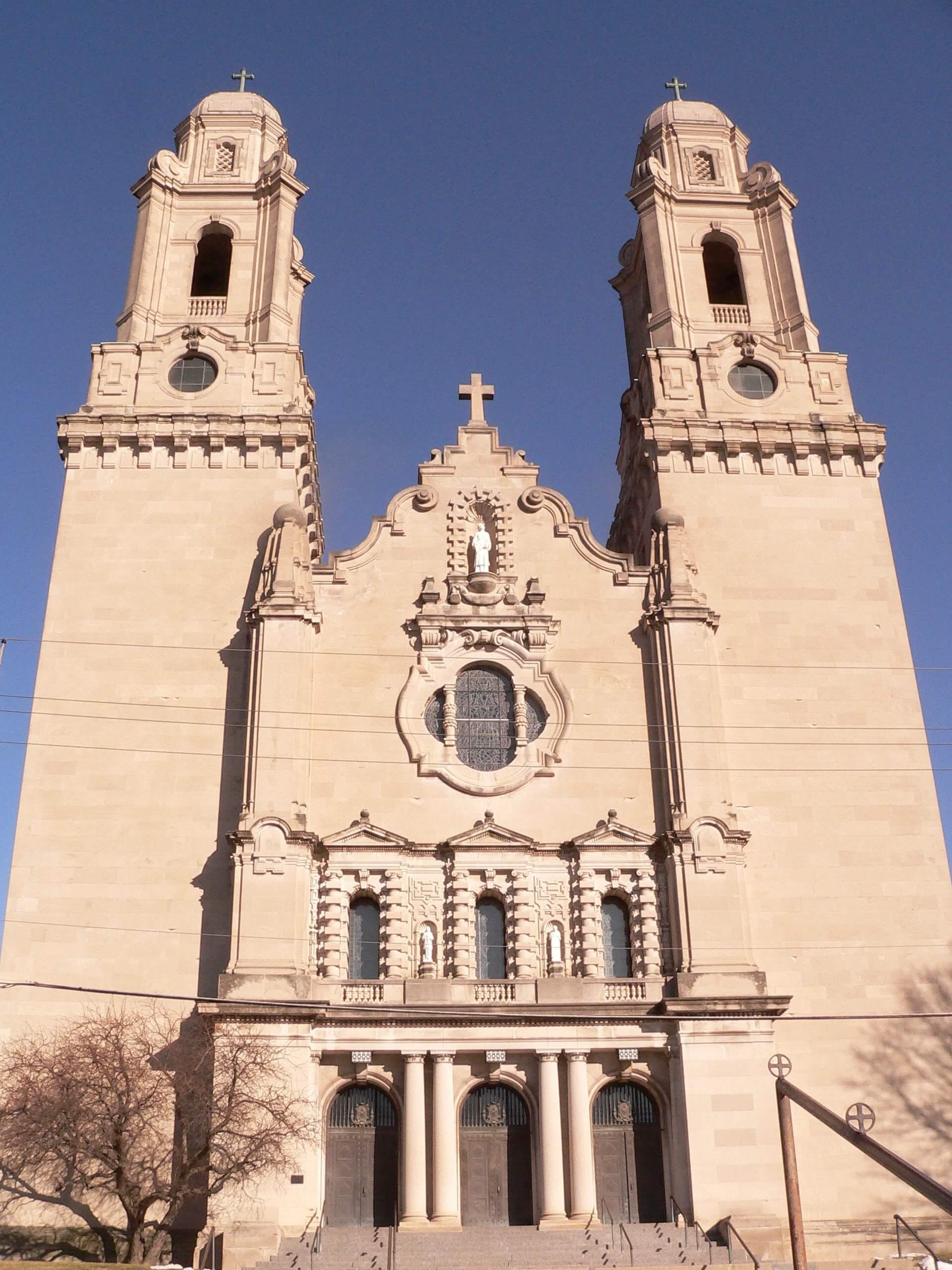
- St. Cecilia Cathedral

- Coat of Arms

Location
- Country: United States
- Territory: 23 counties in northeastern Nebraska
- Episcopal conference: United States Conference of Catholic Bishops
- Ecclesiastical region: Region IX
- Ecclesiastical province: Omaha

Statistics
- Area: 14,051 sq mi (36,390 km^{2})
- Population: Total; Catholics: (as of 2023); ▲1,047,607; ▲238,731 (▼22.8%)
- Parishes: ▼122

Information
- Denomination: Catholic Church
- Sui iuris church: Latin Church
- Rite: Roman Rite
- Established: January 6, 1857 (169 years ago)
- Cathedral: St. Cecilia Cathedral
- Patron saint: Saint Cecilia
- Secular priests: 165

Current leadership
- Pope: Leo XIV
- Archbishop: Michael George McGovern
- Vicar General: Scott A. Hastings
- Judicial Vicar: James R. de Anda
- Bishops emeritus: Elden Francis Curtiss, George Joseph Lucas

Map
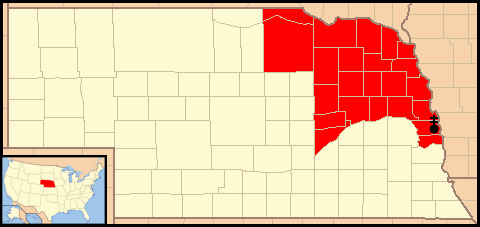

Website
- www.archomaha.org

The Archdiocese of Omaha (Latin: Archidioecesis Omahensis) is a diocese of the Catholic Church in northeastern Nebraska in the United States. Its mother church is St. Cecilia Cathedral in Omaha; as of 2025, the archbishop is Michael George McGovern.

== Territory ==
The Archdiocese of Omaha includes 23 counties in northeast Nebraska: Boyd, Holt, Merrick, Nance, Boone, Antelope, Knox, Pierce, Madison, Platte, Colfax, Stanton, Wayne, Cedar, Dixon, Dakota, Thurston, Cuming, Dodge, Burt, Washington, Douglas, and Sarpy.

== History ==
=== 1838 to 1888 ===
The first Catholic missionary to visit present-day Nebraska was Peter De Smet, a Jesuit priest who crossed the Missouri River into the territory to baptize two infants of the Otoe people near present-day Bellevue in 1838. At that time, the area was under the jurisdiction of the Diocese of St. Louis. DeSmet later traveled along the Platte River to a council of the tribes.

In the mid-19th century, the Omaha area was part of the Nebraska Territory, a vast jurisdiction that covered five states in the Northern Plains and the Rocky Mountains. For the Catholic church, the Nebraska Territory fell under the Apostolic Vicariate of Indian Territory (East of the Rocky Mountains). The first church of any denomination in Nebraska was St. Mary's, established in Omaha in 1856.

In 1857, Pope Pius IX established a smaller jurisdiction, the Apostolic Vicariate of Nebraska. He named James O'Gorman as the apostolic vicar in 1859. When O'Gorman arrived in Omaha, he had three priests to assist him; he ordained another priest later that year.

The construction of the Union Pacific Railroad in 1867 brought more Catholic immigrants into Nebraska. Due to the poverty of his vicariate, O'Gorman relied heavily on financial support from the Society for the Propagation of the Faith in Lyon, France, along with the Leopoldine Society of Austria-Hungary and the Ludwig Missionsverein of the Kingdom of Bavaria.

Many Irish immigrants working on the railroad in Nebraska were suffering injuries and illnesses. This prompted O'Gorman to plan a Catholic hospital in Omaha. Having a location for the hospital, he tasked the Sisters of Mercy to raise funds for it. The new hospital opened in 1870. O'Gorman also worked with the Sisters of Mercy to open Mount Saint Mary's Academy, the first Catholic girls school in Omaha. By the time O'Gorman died in 1874, the vicariate had 19 priests serving 12,000 Catholics in 20 parishes and 56 missions.

The second apostolic vicar of Nebraska was James O'Connor, appointed by Pius IX. In 1883, Pope Leo XIII erected the Apostolic Vicariate of Montana, taking sections of Montana from the Vicariate of Nebraska.

=== 1888 to 1900 ===
Leo XIII suppressed the Apostolic Vicariate of Nebraska in 1888 and replaced it with the Diocese of Omaha, covering all of Nebraska and Wyoming. O'Connor became the first bishop of Omaha. During his tenure as bishop, O'Connor introduced the Franciscan Fathers, the Poor Clares, the Religious of the Sacred Heart, the Benedictines, and the Sisters of Providence to the diocese. In 1879, he founded Creighton School, later to become Creighton College, in Omaha.

In 1887, Leo XIII erected the Dioceses of Cheyenne and Lincoln, taking their territory from the Diocese of Omaha. At this point, the diocese only included eastern Nebraska. With the assistance of Sister Katharine Drexel, O'Connor founded the Sisters of the Blessed Sacrament, a religious order for Native Americans and African Americans, in 1889. O'Connor died in 1890.

The next bishop of Omaha was Bishop Richard Scannell from the Diocese of Concordia in Kansas, named by Leo XIII in 1891. Under his governance, the cornerstone of St. Cecilia Cathedral was laid in 1907. He also oversaw the diocese's expansion to 95 parishes, serving more than 80,000 Catholics. The number of parochial schools and diocesan priests more than doubled and there were increases in the number of religious men and women.

Scannell erected the St. Joseph Mercy Hospital in Omaha in 1892. In 1895, the Good Shepherd Sisters founded the Good Shepherd Home, a residence for troubled girls. He also introduced the following religious orders to the diocese:

- Third Order Regular of St. Francis
- Sisters of St. Joseph
- Presentation Sisters
- Sisters of the Resurrection
- Sisters of St. Benedict
- Sisters of the Blessed Sacrament
- Good Shepherd Sisters
- Dominicans
- Felicians
- Ursulines
- Franciscan.

=== 1900 to 1945 ===
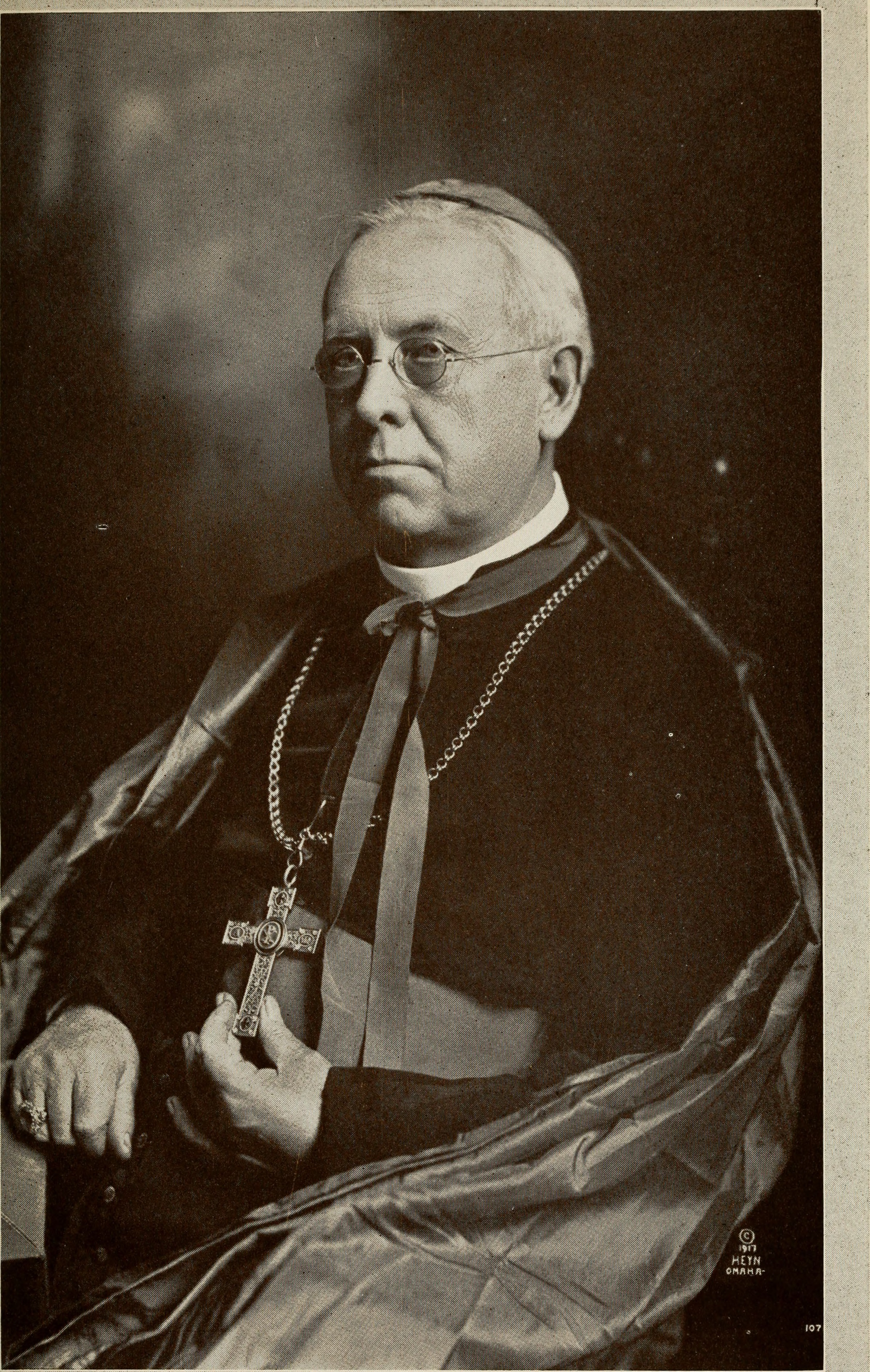
Bishop Harty (pre-1917)

In 1912, Pope Pius X erected the Diocese of Kearney, taking its territory from the Diocese of Omaha. Four years later, Pope Benedict XV added several more counties from Omaha to Kearney. Scannell died in 1916.

Archbishop Jeremiah Harty from the Archdiocese of Manila in the Philippines was named bishop of Omaha by Benedict XV in 1916. Though appointed a bishop, Harty retained the personal title of archbishop. In 1917, Harty expressed skepticism of Edward J. Flanagan's establishment of Boys Town, a home for troubled boys in Nebraska. However, Harty later endorsed its goals. The Sisters of Mercy opened the College of Saint Mary for women in Omaha in 1923. Harty died in 1927.

Joseph Rummel replaced Harty in 1928. Rummel became archbishop of the Archdiocese of New Orleans in 1935. James Ryan, rector of Catholic University of America in Washington, D.C., and titular bishop of Modra, was the next bishop of Omaha.

=== 1945 to 1993 ===
Pope Pius XII elevated the Diocese of Omaha to the Archdiocese of Omaha on August 4, 1945. The pope named Ryan as the first archbishop of Omaha. Ryan died in 1947.

The second archbishop of Omaha was Bishop Gerald Bergan of the Diocese of Des Moines, appointed in 1948. During his administration, more than $80 million was spent for new Catholic schools, churches, and hospitals in the archdiocese. This caused him to become known as the "building bishop". After Bergan retired in 1969, Auxiliary Bishop Daniel E. Sheehan of Omaha succeeded him.

Sheehan's campaign for educational excellence raised more than $26 million to improve Catholic education in the Omaha Metropolitan Area. In response to the reforms of the Second Vatican Council, Sheehan established the Archdiocesan Pastoral Council (APC) in the early 1970s. He gathered representatives from the clergy, the religious communities and the laity to share in the archdiocesan decision-making process. The APC placed emphasis on improving family life, youth and young adult ministry, evangelization, social and rural life issues and Hispanic ministry. Sheehan led capital campaigns to raise funds for archdiocesan improvements, including a $4.5 million refurbishment of the St. James Center. His final campaign had a goal of $25 million to build Skutt Catholic High School in Omaha and take care of other capital needs in the archdiocese. Sheehan retired in 1993.

=== 1993 to present ===
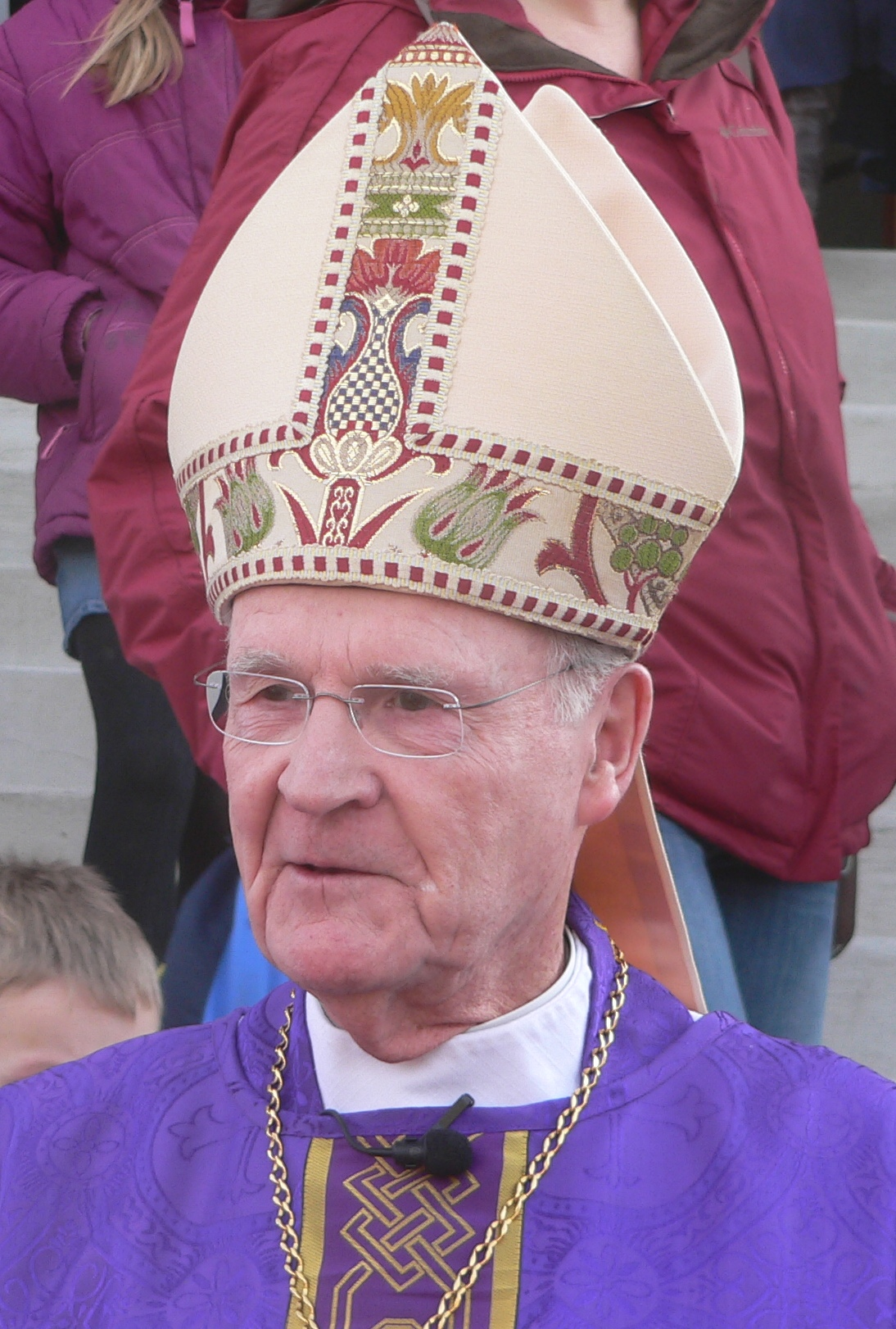
Archbishop Curtiss (2013)

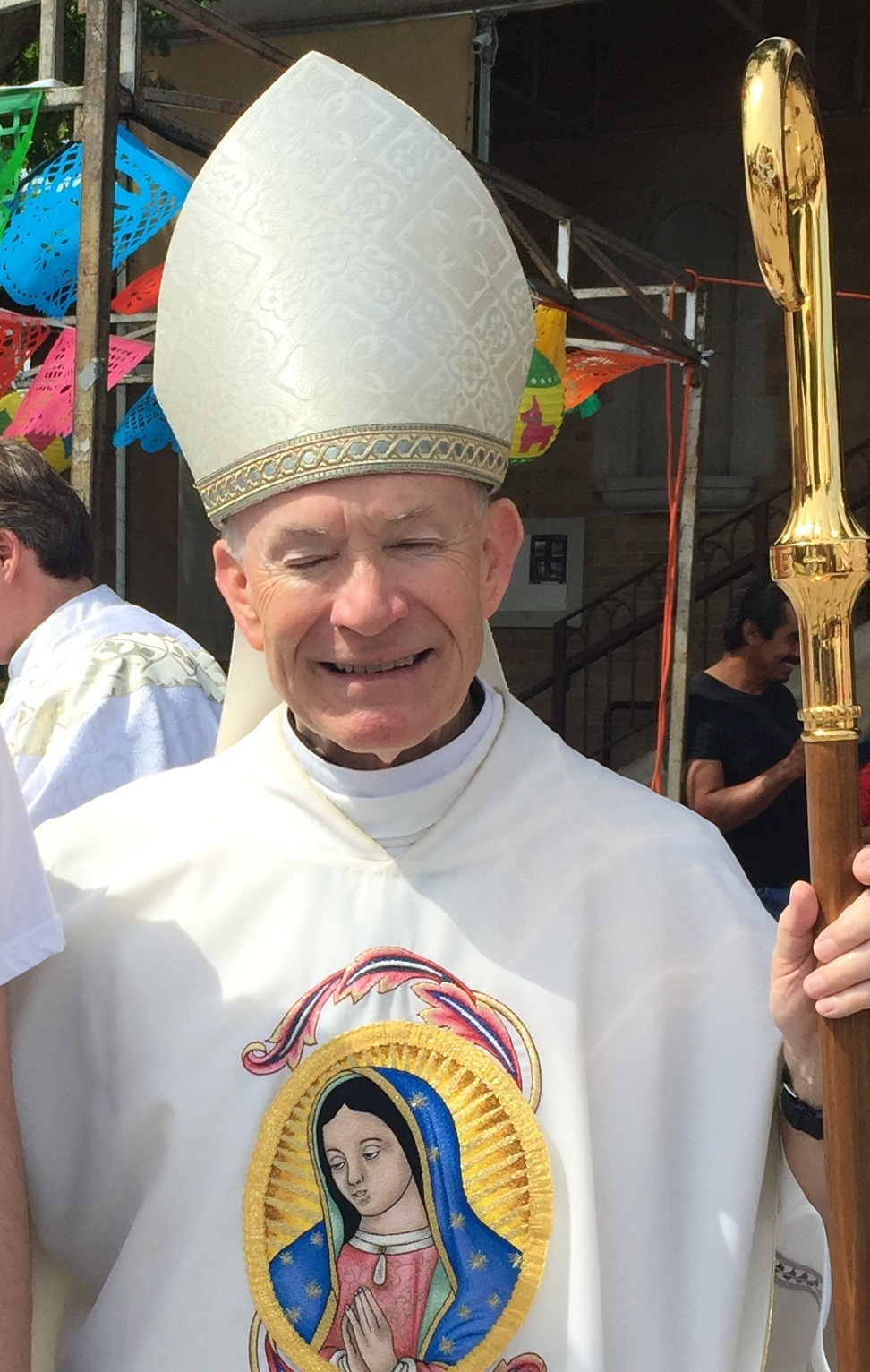
Archbishop Lucas (2023)

Pope John Paul II in 1993 appointed Bishop Elden Curtiss of the Diocese of Helena as the next archbishop of Omaha. Curtiss retired in 2009. That same year, Pope Benedict XVI named Bishop George Joseph Lucas of the Diocese of Springfield in Illinois as the fifth archbishop of Omaha.

Lucas denied the Intercessors' application and sent the community a list of mandatory reforms. After they refused, Lucas revoked official approval for the group. The community dissolved soon after.

On March 31, 2025, Pope Francis accepted Lucas resignation and named Bishop Michael George McGovern from the Diocese of Belleville as his successor.

=== Sexual abuse scandal ===
During the 1980s and 1990s, John Fiala amassed accusations of inappropriate behavior toward boys in the Archdiocese of Omaha. However, when Fiala tried to transfer to the Archdiocese of San Antonio in 1995, officials in Omaha gave him a clean bill of health. Fiala was convicted in Texas of attempted murder in 2010 and sentenced to 40 years in prison. In 2014, he was convicted of sexually abusing the boy and was sentenced to 30 years in prison.

Daniel Herek, a priest serving in Omaha, was convicted in 1998 of sexually assaulting and videotaping a 14-year-old boy and was sentenced to 20 months to five years in prison. He was laicized. In 2002, a jury awarded $800,000 from the archdiocese to a boy who had been abused by Herek.

In 2002, Archbishop Curtiss removed Thomas Sellentin, an archdiocesan priest, from public ministry after Sellentin admitted sexually abusing boy over a 30-year period. In 2003, three brothers sued the archdiocese, stating they had all been abused by Sellentin. Sellentin was laicized in 2019.

In November 2018, the archdiocese released the names of 38 priests and other clergy members who have been credibly accused of sexual misconduct, an action requested by the state's top prosecutor. The archdiocese acknowledged that it did not record reports of sexual abuse until 1978.

== Bishops ==
Archbishop of Omaha
- Archbishopric

catholic
- The coat of arms of the Archbishop Michael George McGovern
- Incumbent; Michael George McGovern

Location
- Ecclesiastical province: Metropolitan Archdiocese of Omaha

Information
- First holder: James Myles O'Gorman
- Denomination: Catholic Church
- Sui iuris church: Latin Church
- Established: 1859
- Diocese: Diocese of Omaha
- Cathedral: St. Cecilia Cathedral

Website
- archomaha.org

=== Apostolic Vicars of Nebraska ===
1. James Myles O'Gorman (1859–1874)
2. James O'Connor (1876–1890)

=== Bishops of Omaha ===
1. James O'Connor (1876–1890)
2. Richard Scannell (1891–1916)
3. Jeremiah James Harty (1916–1927), Archbishop (personal title)
4. Joseph Francis Rummel (1928–1935), appointed Archbishop of New Orleans
5. James Hugh Ryan (1935–1947) became Archbishop of Omaha in 1945

=== Metropolitan Archbishops of Omaha ===
1. James Hugh Ryan (1935–1947)
2. Gerald Thomas Bergan (1947–1969)
3. Daniel E. Sheehan (1969–1993)
4. Elden Francis Curtiss (1993–2009)
5. George Joseph Lucas (2009–2025)
6. Michael George McGovern (2025–present)

=== Auxiliary bishops ===
- Daniel E. Sheehan (1964–1969), appointed Archbishop here
- Anthony Michael Milone (1981–1987), appointed Bishop of Great Falls-Billings

=== Other diocesan priests who became bishops ===
- Blase Joseph Cupich, appointed Bishop of Rapid City in 1998; future cardinal
- William Joseph Dendinger, appointed Bishop of Grand Island in 2004
- Joseph Gerard Hanefeldt, appointed Bishop of Grand Island in 2015
- Edward Joseph Hunkeler, appointed Bishop of Grand Island in 1945
- Patrick Aloysius Alphonsus McGovern, appointed Bishop of Cheyenne in 1912
- John Linus Paschang, appointed Bishop of Grand Island in 1951

Ralph Bernard O'Donnell, appointed Bishop of Jefferson City in 2025

== Omaha Catholic schools ==
The Omaha Catholic Schools is a school district in the Archdiocese of Omaha. Over 19,000 students attend Omaha Catholic Schools each year. As of 2025, the school district was composed of:

- 51 elementary schools
- Five private, single-sex high schools
- Three coed high schools in Metro Omaha
- Seven coed rural and middle high schools

=== High schools ===
School	Type	City	Address	Founded
All Saints Catholic School	K-8	Omaha	1335 S. 10th St.	
Archbishop Bergan High School	6–12	Fremont	545 East 4th St.	1950
Cedar Catholic Junior Senior High School	Rural	Hartington	401 South Broadway	1905
Creighton Prep	All boys	Omaha	7400 Western Ave.	1878
Duchesne Academy of the Sacred Heart	All girls	Omaha	3601 Burt St.	1881
Gross Catholic High School	Private	Bellevue	7700 South 43rd St.	1968
Guardian Angels Central Catholic High School	Rural	West Point	419 East Decatur	1885
Marian High School	All girls	Omaha	7400 Military Ave.	1955
Mercy High School	All girls	Omaha	1501 South 48th St.	1955
Mount Michael Benedictine School	All boys	Omaha	22520 Mount Michael Rd	1953
Norfolk Catholic School	Rural	Norfolk	2300 Madison Ave.	1926
Pope John XXIII Central Catholic High School	Rural	Elgin	303 Remington St.	1967
Roncalli Catholic High School	Private	Omaha	6401 Sorensen Pwy.	1974
St. Mary's High School	K-12	O'Neill	300 North 4th St.	1900
Scotus Central Catholic	Rural	Columbus	1554 18th Ave.	1889
Skutt Catholic High School	Private	Omaha	3131 S. 156th St.	1993

== Suffragan sees ==
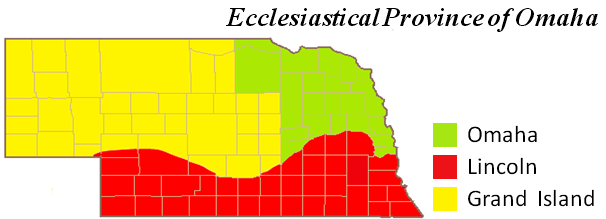
Ecclesiastical Province of Omaha

- Diocese of Grand Island
- Diocese of Lincoln
