= St. Cecilia Cathedral (Omaha) =

Historic church in Nebraska, United States

- St. Cecilia's Cathedral
- U.S. National Register of Historic Places
- Omaha Landmark
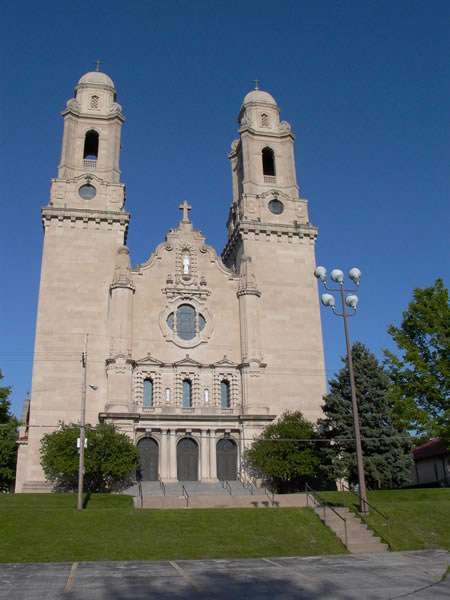
- St. Cecilia Cathedral
- Location: Omaha, Nebraska
- Coordinates: 41°15′59.4″N 95°58′19.9″W
- Built: 1905
- Architect: Thomas Rogers Kimball
- Architectural style: Spanish Renaissance Revival
- NRHP reference No.: 79001442

Significant dates
- Added to NRHP: January 25, 1979
- Designated OMAL: May 22, 1979

Saint Cecilia Cathedral is the cathedral church of the Roman Catholic Archdiocese of Omaha in Omaha, Nebraska, in the United States. Located at 701 North 40th Street in the Gold Coast Historic District, the cathedral was ranked in 1905 as one of the ten largest cathedrals in the country. It is listed on the National Register of Historic Places.

== History ==
=== 1887 to 1950 ===
In 1887, Bishop James O'Connor, leader of the Apostolic Vicariate of Nebraska, erected Saint Cecilia Parish in the western area of Omaha. The parishioners had already constructed a small wooden church on a leased property with a 50 feet (15 m) bell tower. It was close to a railway line, making it easy for Catholics from other parts of the city to worship there. It was dedicated in 1888. Also in 1888, Pope Leo XIII elevated the Apostolic Vicariate of Nebraska into the Diocese of Omaha, with Saint Philomena Church designated as its first cathedral.

In 1898, the lease on the Saint Cecilia property ran out. Although the landlord said he would extend the lease, the parish leaders thought it wise to plan to move the wooden church to a property they owned. Then in 1901, Bishop Richard Scannell decided that this parish property should become the site of the new Saint Cecilia Cathedral, replacing Saint Philomena. In 1904, the Saint Cecilia wooden church was moved to a section of the property, to serve the parish until the cathedral was constructed next to it.

Scannell hired the architect Thomas Rogers Kimball of Omaha to design the new cathedral. The cathedral plans were finalized in 1905. Scannell and the construction committee agreed that the diocese should not go into debt over this project and decided to build the cathedral at a slow pace. Many Catholics in the diocese disagreed with the choice of its location as being too far from the population centers. The cornerstone was laid on October 6, 1907, with 30,000 spectators watching the ceremony. The first mass in the unfinished cathedral was held in 1916. In 1917, a severe windstorm blew the scaffolding off the cathedral onto the wooden church, demolishing it. In 1945, Pope Pius XII elevated the Diocese of Omaha to the Archdiocese of Omaha.

=== 1950 to present ===
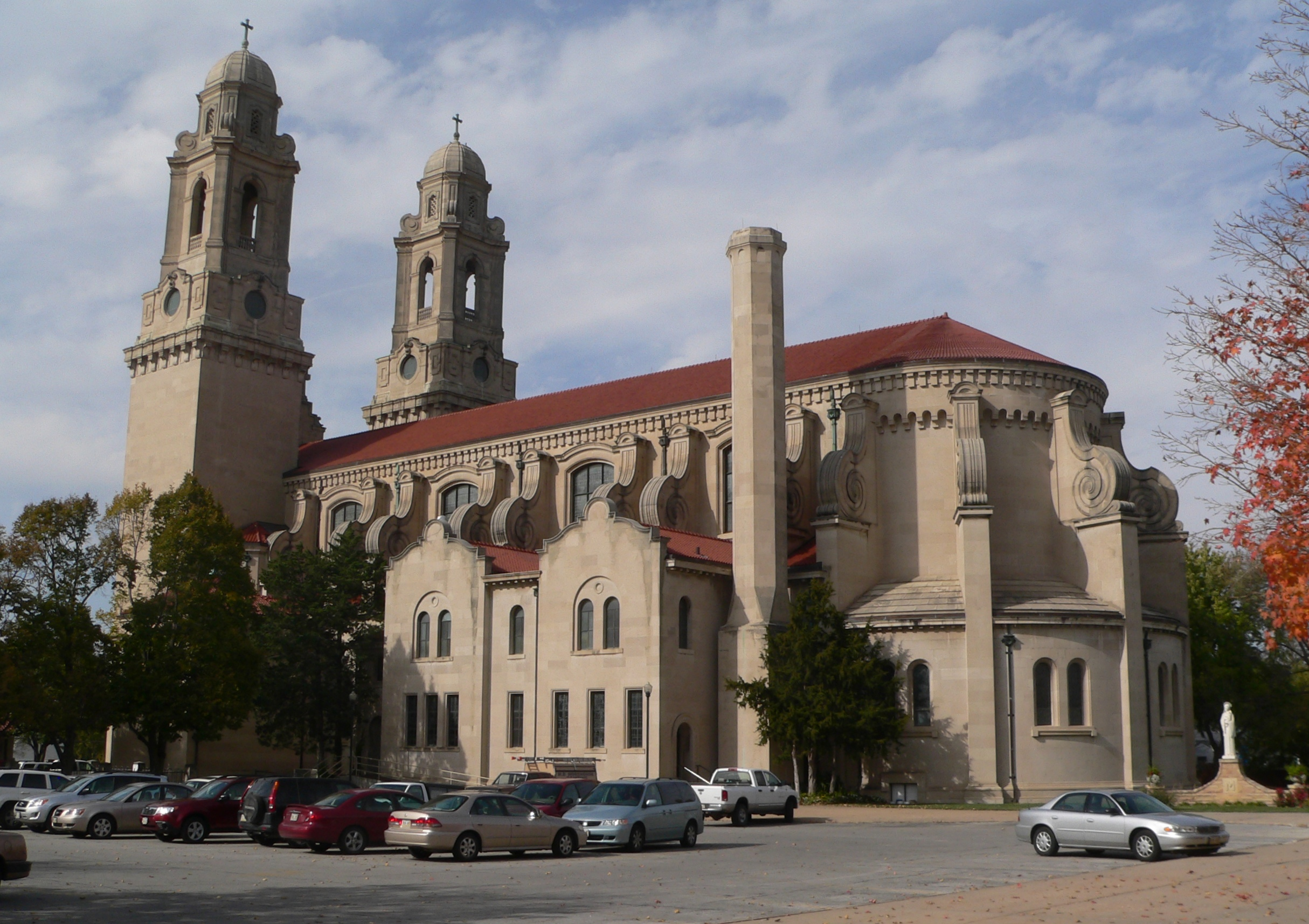
Saint Cecilia Cathedral (2011)

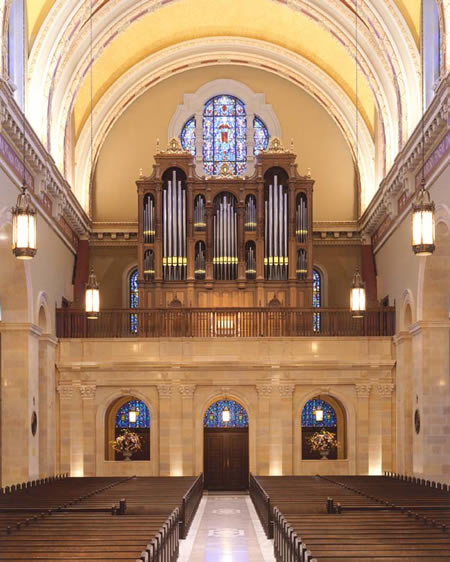
Pipe organ, Saint Cecilia Cathedral (2005)

After decades of construction, Saint Cecilia was finally consecrated in 1959. In 2004, a $1.2 million pipe organ was installed in the cathedral.

In 2007, a painting of The Virgin Immaculata was stolen from Saint Cecilia. The painting was an 8-by-5-foot (2.4 by 1.5 m) image, part of a collection donated to the cathedral in 2002. It had an estimated value of $100,000. An Omaha man in 2009 pleaded no contest to the theft; the painting, sold in Mexico, was never recovered.

Two men in 2015 robbed an elderly woman of her purse in the lobby of Saint Cecilia, with one man punching the woman in the face. Both men were later apprehended. The victim, who was not seriously injured, said she forgave her assailants.

The archdiocese in February 2025 announced plans to create a $8.2 memorial garden and outdoor plaza on the cathedral grounds, completing the plan created by the architect in 1905.

== Design ==
Ranked among the ten largest cathedrals in the United States when it was completed, Saint Cecilia's Cathedral is 255 feet (78 m) long, 158 feet (48 m) wide, and 222 feet (68 m) high.

The cathedral was built in the Spanish Renaissance Revival, rather than the European Gothic architecture popular in the early 20th century. The roof is covered with Ludowici tiles and the walls have a steel frame under masonry walls made of Bedford limestone.

== Organ ==
The cathedral organ was built by Pasi Organ Builders and inaugurated in 2004. The instrument has 55 stops, three manuals and pedals. A unique feature of the organ is the option of playing 29 of the stops in either meantone or Wegscheider well-tempered tuning (the remaining stops being well-tempered).

== See also ==
- List of Catholic cathedrals in the United States
- List of churches in Omaha, Nebraska
