= Gerald Thomas Bergan =

American clergyman

His Excellency, The Most Reverend Gerald Thomas Bergan
- Archbishop of Omaha; Titular Archbishop of Tacarata
- See: Archdiocese of Omaha
- Installed: February 7, 1948
- Term ended: June 11, 1969
- Predecessor: James Hugh Ryan
- Successor: Daniel E. Sheehan
- Other posts: Bishop of Des Moines (1934–1948)

Orders
- Ordination: October 28, 1915 by Basilio Pompilj
- Consecration: June 13, 1934 by George Mundelein

Personal details
- Born: January 26, 1892 Peoria, Illinois, US
- Died: July 12, 1972 (aged 80) Omaha, Nebraska, US
- Denomination: Roman Catholic Church
- Education: St. Viator College; Pontifical North American College
- Motto: Nisi Dominus frustra (Everything is in vain without God)

Ordination history of Gerald Thomas Bergan
History
Episcopal consecration
- Consecrated by: George Mundelein
Episcopal succession
Bishops consecrated by Gerald Thomas Bergan as principal consecrator
- John Joseph Boylan: February 17, 1943
- John Linus Paschang: October 9, 1951
- Tomás Guilherme Murphy, C.Ss.R.: January 2, 1963
- Daniel E. Sheehan: March 19, 1964

Gerald Thomas Bergan (January 26, 1892 – July 12, 1972) was an American clergyman of the Roman Catholic Church. He served as bishop of the Diocese of Des Moines in Iowa (1934–1948) and archbishop of the Archdiocese of Omaha in Nebraska (1948–1969).

== Biography ==
=== Early life ===
Gerald Bergan was born on January 26, 1892, in Peoria, Illinois, to William and Mary (née O'Connell) Bergan. After graduating from Spalding Institute, a Catholic high school in Peoria, he attended St. Viator College in Bourbonnais, Illinois, where he excelled in athletics. Bergan continued his studies at the Pontifical North American College in Rome.

=== Priesthood ===
Bergan was ordained to the priesthood in Rome for the Diocese of Peoria on October 28, 1915 by Cardinal Basilio Pompilj. Upon his return to the United States, he served as chancellor and vicar general of the diocese, and rector of the Cathedral of St. Mary of the Immaculate Conception in Peoria.

=== Bishop of Des Moines ===
On March 24, 1934, Bergan was appointed the third bishop of the Diocese of Des Moines by Pope Pius XI. He received his episcopal consecration at the Cathedral of St. Mary of the Immaculate Conception on June 13, 1934, from Cardinal George Mundelein, with Bishops Joseph Schlarman and Henry Rohlman serving as co-consecrators. As bishop, Bergan established a diocesan newspaper called The Messenger.

At the Ninth National Eucharistic Congress in St. Paul, Minnesota, in 1941, Bergan spoke on labor-management relations. Bergan asserted that the employer must engage with workers in collective bargaining. He also called for a single union for both labor and capital, and suggested that senior employees should have a share in the management of an enterprise.

=== Archbishop of Omaha ===
Bergan was named by Pius XII as the second archbishop of Omaha on February 7, 1948. During his administration, the archdiocese spent over $80 million on schools, churches, and hospitals. This activity gained Bergen the nickname of "building bishop". Between 1962 and 1965, Bergan attended all four sessions of the Second Vatican Council in Rome.

=== Retirement ===
On June 11, 1969, Pope Paul VI accepted Bergan's resignation as archbishop of Omaha and appointed him as titular archbishop of Tacarata. He resigned his titular see on January 28, 1971, and died in Omaha on July 12, 1972, at age 80.

== Legacy ==
The following institutions are named after Bergen:

- CHI Health Creighton University Medical Center - Bergan Mercy in Omaha, Nebraska
- Archbishop Bergan High School in Fremont, Nebraska
- The former Bergan High School in Peoria. In 1964, Bergan officiated at the school's dedication.

Catholic Church titles
Preceded by Thomas William Drumm	Bishop of Des Moines; 1934–1948	Succeeded by Edward Celestin Daly, OP
Preceded by James Hugh Ryan	Archbishop of Omaha; 1948–1969	Succeeded by Daniel E. Sheehan
