= James Hugh Ryan =

American prelate of the Catholic Church (1886–1947)

His Excellency, The Most Reverend James Hugh Ryan
- Archbishop of Omaha; Titular Bishop of Modra
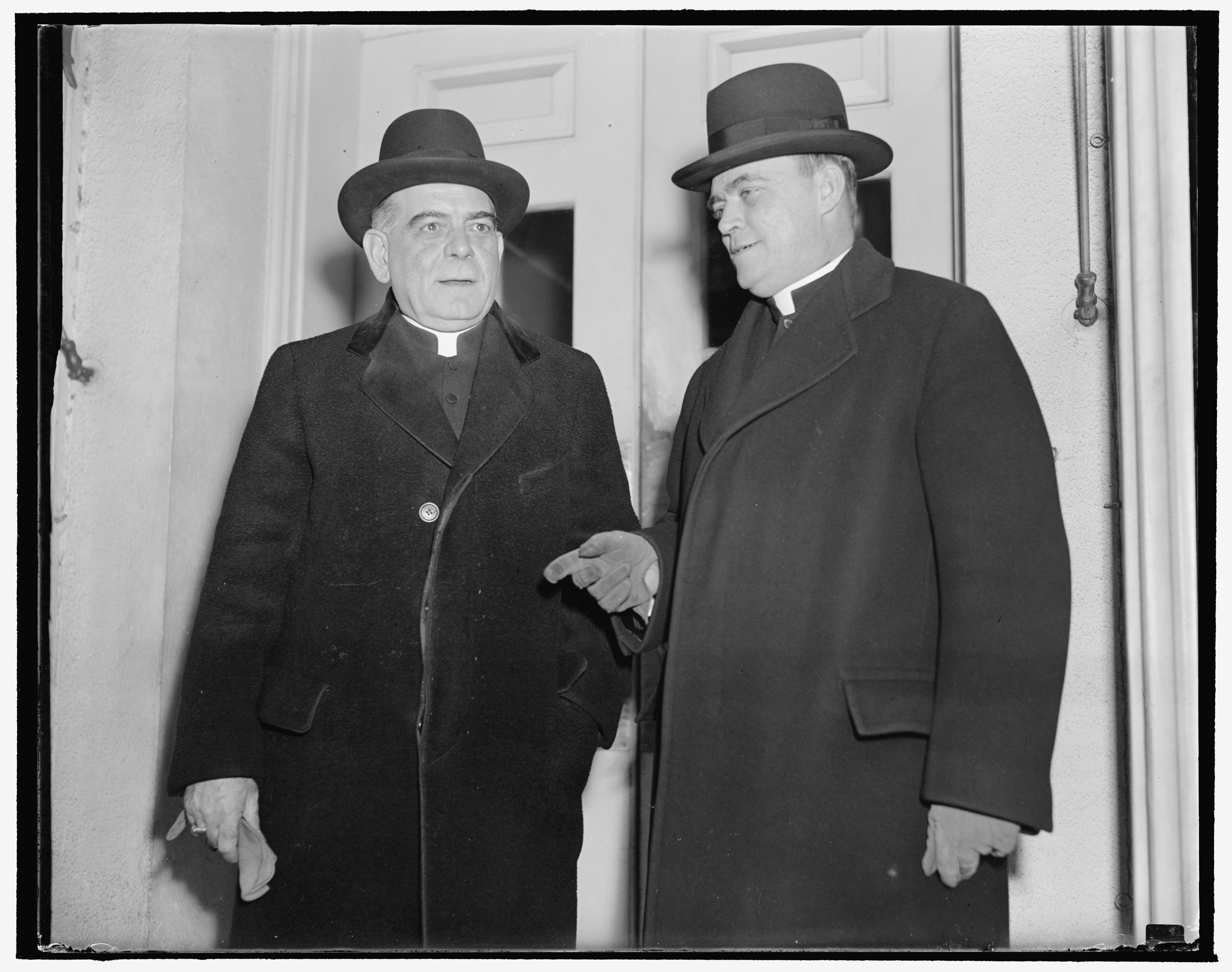
- Church: Catholic Church
- Archdiocese: Archdiocese of Omaha
- Installed: August 3, 1935
- Term ended: November 23, 1947
- Predecessor: Joseph Francis Rummel
- Successor: Gerald Thomas Bergan
- Other post: Rector of the Catholic University of America

Orders
- Ordination: June 5, 1909
- Consecration: October 25, 1934 by Joseph Chartrand

Personal details
- Born: December 15, 1886 Indianapolis, Indiana, U.S.
- Died: November 23, 1947 (aged 60)
- Education: Duquesne University; Mount St. Mary's Seminary of the West; Urban College of Propaganda; Roman Academy

James Hugh Ryan (December 15, 1886 – November 23, 1947) was an American prelate of the Roman Catholic Church. He served as rector of the Catholic University of America from 1928 to 1935, and as bishop and later archbishop of the Archdiocese of Omaha from 1935 until his death.

== Biography ==
=== Early life ===
James Ryan was born on December 15, 1886, in Indianapolis, Indiana, to John Marshall and Brigid (née Rogers) Ryan. John Ryan worked as superintendent of motor power of the Lake Erie and Western Railroad. James Ryan attended Duquesne University in Pittsburgh, Pennsylvania, and Mount St. Mary's Seminary of the West in Cincinnati, Ohio. He then went to Rome, where he earned Bachelor of Sacred Theology (1906) and Doctor of Sacred Theology degrees (1909) from the Urban College of Propaganda and a Ph.D. from the Roman Academy (1908).

=== Priesthood ===
Ryan was ordained to the priesthood in Rome on June 5, 1909. Following his return to Indiana, he was appointed chaplain of the Sisters of Providence of Saint Mary-of-the-Woods in Indiana and professor of psychology at St. Mary-of-the-Woods College in Saint Mary-of-the-Woods, Indiana, from 1911 to 1921.

Ryan then began his career at the Catholic University of America in Washington, D.C., where he served as instructor in philosophy (1922–26) and associate professor of philosophy (1926–28). In July 1928 he was named the fifth rector of the university. During his administration, he reorganized and rebuilt the university, also instituting nursing courses and a School of Social Work and expanding the graduate school to admit 800 students.

Ryan became a well-known and powerful figure in Washington. He was once received by President Franklin D. Roosevelt, and his send-off party was attended by the likes of Ambassador Hans Luther, Assistant Attorney General Joseph B. Keenan, Justice Pierce Butler, Postmaster General James Farley, Secretary Henry A. Wallace, and Canon Anson Phelps Stokes. Ryan served as the first executive secretary of the National Catholic Welfare Council (1920–28), and was raised to the rank of domestic prelate in 1927 and of protonotary apostolic in 1929.

=== Titular Bishop of Modra ===
On August 15, 1933, Ryan was appointed titular bishop of Modra by Pope Pius XI, in acknowledgment of his accomplishments as rector. He received his episcopal consecration on October 25, 1933, from Bishop Joseph Chartrand, with Bishops Thomas Edmund Molloy and Joseph Ritter serving as co-consecrators, at the National Shrine of the Immaculate Conception in Washington, D.C.

=== Bishop and Archbishop of Omaha ===
Following the appointment of Bishop Joseph Rummel to Archbishop of New Orleans in March 1935, Ryan was named the fifth bishop of the Diocese of Omaha on August 3, 1935. In 1939, he was sent to South America to "develop cultural relationships" on behalf of the American Catholic Church and the U.S. Department of State. Following his return, he declared, "The foundation has been laid for a 'Catholic front' to protect democracy in this hemisphere."

When the Diocese of Omaha was elevated to the rank of an archdiocese, Ryan became its first Archbishop on August 4, 1945. He died two years later from a heart attack at age 60.

Academic offices
Preceded by Thomas Joseph Shahan	Rector of CUA; 1928–1935	Succeeded by Joseph M. Corrigan
Catholic Church titles
Preceded by Joseph Francis Rummel	Archbishop of Omaha; 1935–1947	Succeeded by Gerald Thomas Bergan
