= Nebraska School Activities Association =

Activities association in Nebraska

- Formation: 1910; 116 years ago
- Headquarters: 500 Charleston St., Lincoln, Nebraska, United States 68501
- Members: 305 Schools
- Executive Director: Jay Bellar
- Affiliations: National Federation of State High School Associations
- Staff: 13
- Website: www.nsaahome.org
- Formerly called: Nebraska High School Athletics Association

The Nebraska School Activities Association (NSAA) is a statewide organization which oversees interscholastic competition between high schools in the U.S. state of Nebraska. The NSAA was founded in 1910 as the Nebraska High School Athletic Association, and rebranded to its current name in 1949. The NSAA is the only interscholastic activities association in Nebraska, thus, it serves both public and private schools.

== History ==
The Nebraska School Activities Association was preceded by the Nebraska Interscholastic Athletic Association, which was formed in 1900. In 1910, members of the organization left and formed the Nebraska High School Athletic Association. The organization began with fourteen schools and passed a constitution the following year. However, due to overall disagreements with said constitution, the organization lost members and was dissolved for years later. In 1916, the organization was re-established and made major changes to its constitution, bringing back interest.

In 1935, the Nebraska School Athletic Association was reorganized, consolidating all sponsorship activities under one head. That same year the organization changed its name to the Nebraska High School Activities Association. In 1949, the organization expanded to elementary schools and changed its name again to the Nebraska School Activities Association.

The organization moved into its current headquarters at 500 Charleston Street in March 2008. In 2025, during efforts from the federal and state government to ban transgender people in sports, the organization announced that it would comply with Donald Trump's executive order banning transgender athletes in women's sports teams. Previously, the organization allowed transgender people to participate in sports aligning with their gender identity and allowed for cross-gender participation under specific circumstances. However, as part of complying with the order, the organization made those decisions the schools choice.

== Classifications ==
The NSAA divides schools into classes, which are continuously assessed by examination of the size of the school's enrollment. Each activity has a varying number of classes, based on the amount of participating schools and the nature of the activity. As such, some classifications separate further into divisions, which are denoted by a "1" or "2" following the classification's letter. Additionally, each activity has its own standards for classification, meaning that a school may compete in a different classification for separate activities.

For the sports of football, volleyball, softball, basketball and baseball, only the enrollment for the gender playing the sport are counted.

In football, schools with boys enrollments of 55 or fewer in November of an odd-numbered year are eligible to compete for 8-man state championships for the succeeding two seasons (the threshold was 47 until it was raised for the 2026 and 2027 reclassification cycle). Schools with boys enrollments of 27 or fewer are eligible for 6-man title honors.

Unlike many states, the NSAA allows schools to play in a lower classification than their enrollment dictates. Schools exercising this option are ineligible for the postseason. This is most common in football, where some schools which have more than 55 boys enrolled choose to play 8-man. Schools may also elect to play in a higher classification.

| Class | Notes | Ref. |
|---|---|---|
| AA | Only used for music-based activities; based on ensemble size. | |
| A | Consists of schools with total enrollment of 850 students or more (except football, whose minimum is 425 boys), does not separate into divisions. Football teams play standard 11-man football. | |
| B | Does not separate into divisions. Football teams play standard 11-man football. | |
| C | In certain activities (football, volleyball, basketball), Class C separates into C-1 and C-2 divisions. Football teams play standard 11-man football. | |
| D | In certain activities, Class D separates into D-1, D-2, D-3 (football only), and D-6 (football only) divisions. D-1, D-2, and D-3 teams play 8-man football; D-6 plays 6-man football (a version of the sport invented in Nebraska). D-6 was established in 2018 and is a revival of the original Class D-3, which the NSAA governed from 1987 to 1998 (from 1999 to 2017, 6-man football in Nebraska was organized by associations other than the NSAA). In 2026, a third division of 8-man football was added, taking on the D-3 name. | |

== Sponsored Activities ==
=== Fall ===
- Boys and Girls Cross Country
- Football
- Girls Golf
- Softball
- Boys Tennis
- Volleyball

=== Winter ===
- Boys and Girls Basketball
- Boys and Girls Swimming and Diving
- Boys and Girls Wrestling
- Bowling

=== Spring ===
- Baseball
- Boys Golf
- Boys and Girls Soccer
- Girls Tennis
- Boys and Girls Track and Field

=== Year Round ===
- Debate
- Journalism
- Music
- Play Production
- Speech

== Other Activities ==
=== Unified Sports ===
In coordination with the Special Olympics, The NSAA developed a set of activities which allow students with and without intellectual disabilities to participate together in a shared competition. Currently, the NSAA offers two Unified Sports; Unified Bowling and Unified Track and Field.

=== Non-Sponsored Activities ===
Due to Title IX restrictions, limited participation of schools, or other reasons; certain activities are not sponsored by the NSAA, but, though external organizations, high school level competition is provided to Nebraskan high schools. Some of these activities include Cheer and Dance, Ice Hockey, and Trap Shooting. Often, schools organize non-sponsored activities as clubs, as a way to keep school affiliation regulated.
