= Basilica of the Co-Cathedral of the Sacred Heart =

Historic church in Charleston, West Virginia, United States

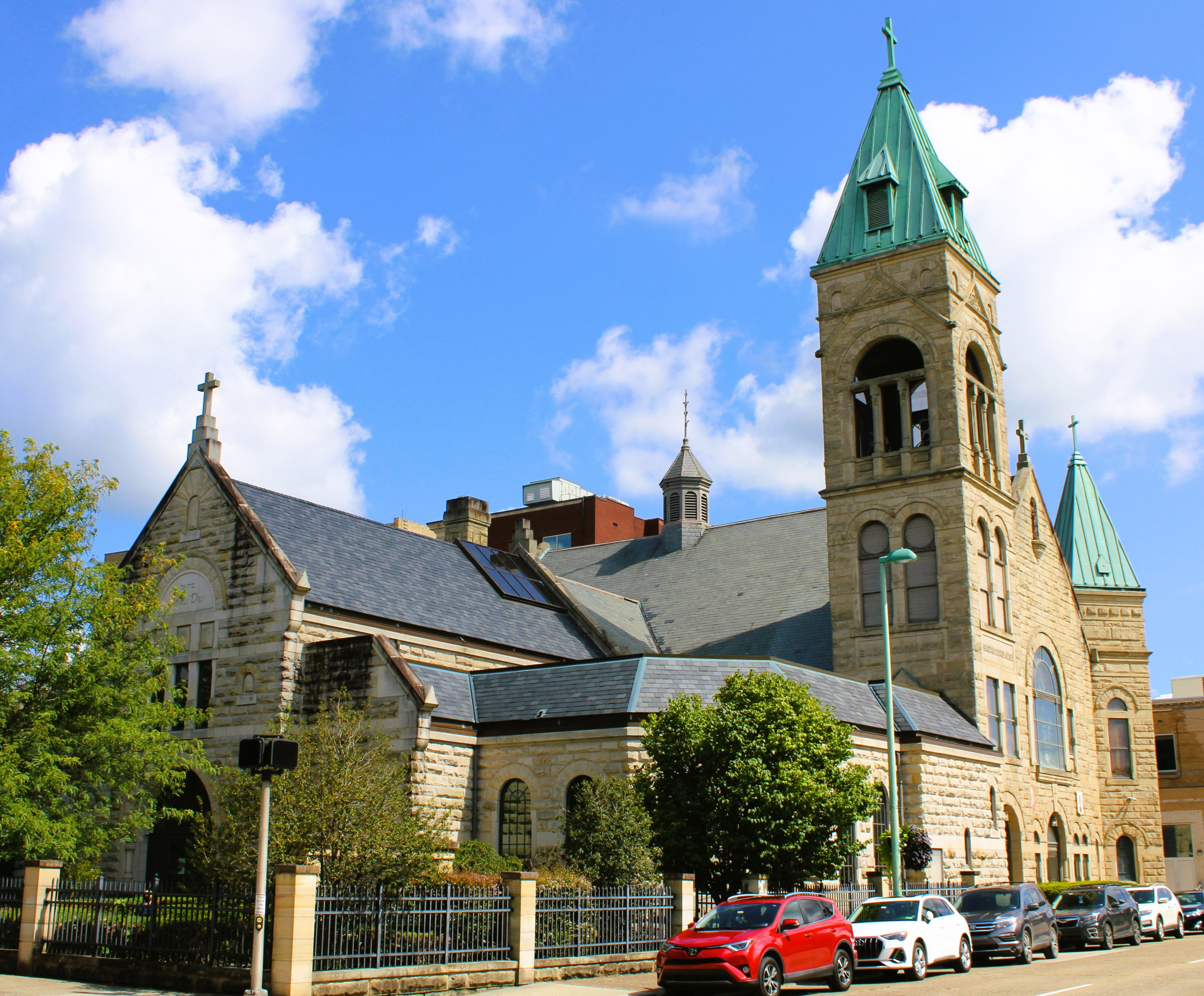
- The basilica in 2023
- Basilica of the Co-Cathedral of the Sacred Heart
- Location: 1114 Virginia Street, East; Charleston, West Virginia
- Country: United States
- Denomination: Roman Catholic Church
- Website: www.sacredheartcocathedral.com

History
- Founded: 1866

Architecture
- Architect: H.B. Lowe
- Style: Romanesque Revival
- Groundbreaking: 1895
- Completed: 1897

Specifications
- Materials: Limestone

Administration
- Diocese: Wheeling-Charleston

Clergy
- Bishop: Most Rev. Evelio Menjivar-Ayala
- Rector: Donald X. Higgs
- Sacred Heart
- U.S. Historic district – Contributing property
- Part of: Downtown Charleston Historic District (ID06000166)
- Added to NRHP: March 24, 2006

The Basilica of the Co-Cathedral of the Sacred Heart is a cathedral church and a minor basilica located in Charleston, West Virginia, United States. Along with the Cathedral of St. Joseph in Wheeling it is the seat of the Catholic Diocese of Wheeling-Charleston.

== History ==
=== First Sacred Heart Church ===
During the first part of the 19th century, Charleston was part of the State of Virginia; the few Catholics in the city were under the jurisdiction of the Diocese of Richmond. The first Catholic priest to visit present-day West Virginia arrived in 1832. The next recorded visit by a priest was that of Alexander L. Hitzelberger of Norfolk, Virginia in 1836. While visiting visited relatives in Charleston, Hitzelberger celebrated a mass in the city courthouse. Bishop Richard Vincent Whelan of Richmond visited Charleston in 1842.

Pope Pius IX established the Diocese of Wheeling on July 19, 1850, which covered the entire West Virginia area. The pope named Whelan as its first bishop. At this time, Charleston did not yet have a parish. Various priests visited the area periodically to celebrate mass, baptize infants and perform marriages. A Reverend Joseph Stenger settled in Charleston, in what was now the State of West Virginia, for a short time in 1862. However, he soon left because the American Civil War of 1861 to 1865 had made his ministry untenable. After the end of the war, Stenger returned to Charleston in 1866. He began celebrating mass at on the second floor of B. Ward's store on Front Street in Charleston.

On August 1, 1866, Whelan erected Sacred Heart Parish. At that time, the parish had 63 families scattered over six counties as parishioners. Whelan purchased a two-story brick building in Charleston to serve as a church and school. In 1869, the Sacred Heart congregation constructed a 60 by 25 feet (18.3 m × 7.6 m) frame church for $1,500.00. The first assistant pastor assigned to Sacred Heart in 1870 was the Terence I. Duffy. He and Stenger soon established mission churches in the area. The parish in 1872 constructed a new school building.

By 1875, the existing Sacred Heart Church was too small for the growing parish. Stenger started fundraising for a new church, receiving contribution from prominent Protestants in the city. The parish in 1887 opened Mount Olivet Cemetery. A parish census in 1892 showed an enrollment of 140 congregants. Also in 1892, Stanger selected H.B. Lowe of Lexington, Kentucky, as architect for the new church, spending $600 to design the new building.

=== Second Sacred Heart Church ===
The second Sacred Heart Church was dedicated in December 1897. Stenger died in 1900. In 1901, a group of Capuchin priests took over the operation of Sacred Heart Parish. They constructed a new rectory in 1902.

The Capuchins purchased the first pipe organ for the parish in 1905. They installed a new marble high altar in the sanctuary along with stained glass windows from Munich, Germany in 1909. The parish placed three bells placed in the tower in 1911:

- St. Richard, weighing 2,600 pounds (1,200 kg)
- St. Joseph, 1,500 pounds (680 kg) a
- Blessed Virgin, 700 pounds (320 kg)

In 1948, the Capuchins purchased a Wurlitzer electronic organ for $4,500.00 to replace the 1905 pipe organ.

The St. Cecilia's Guild started a weekly bingo to raise the money for a new Kilgen pipe organ, which cost $31,832.48. The interior of the church was extensively renovated from 1950 to 1951 and the front portion of the current rectory was completed the following year. The Capuchins in 1956 established a new baptistry and remodeled the two sacristies.

The parish completed a new convent in 1958. New pews were installed in the church in 1958 for $11,429. The stained glass windows were repaired in 1960 and exterior of the church was sandblasted in 1961. The painter John L. Baker of Hickory, Pennsylvania, created an artwork on the sanctuary ceiling in 1966.

=== Sacred Heart Co-Cathedral ===
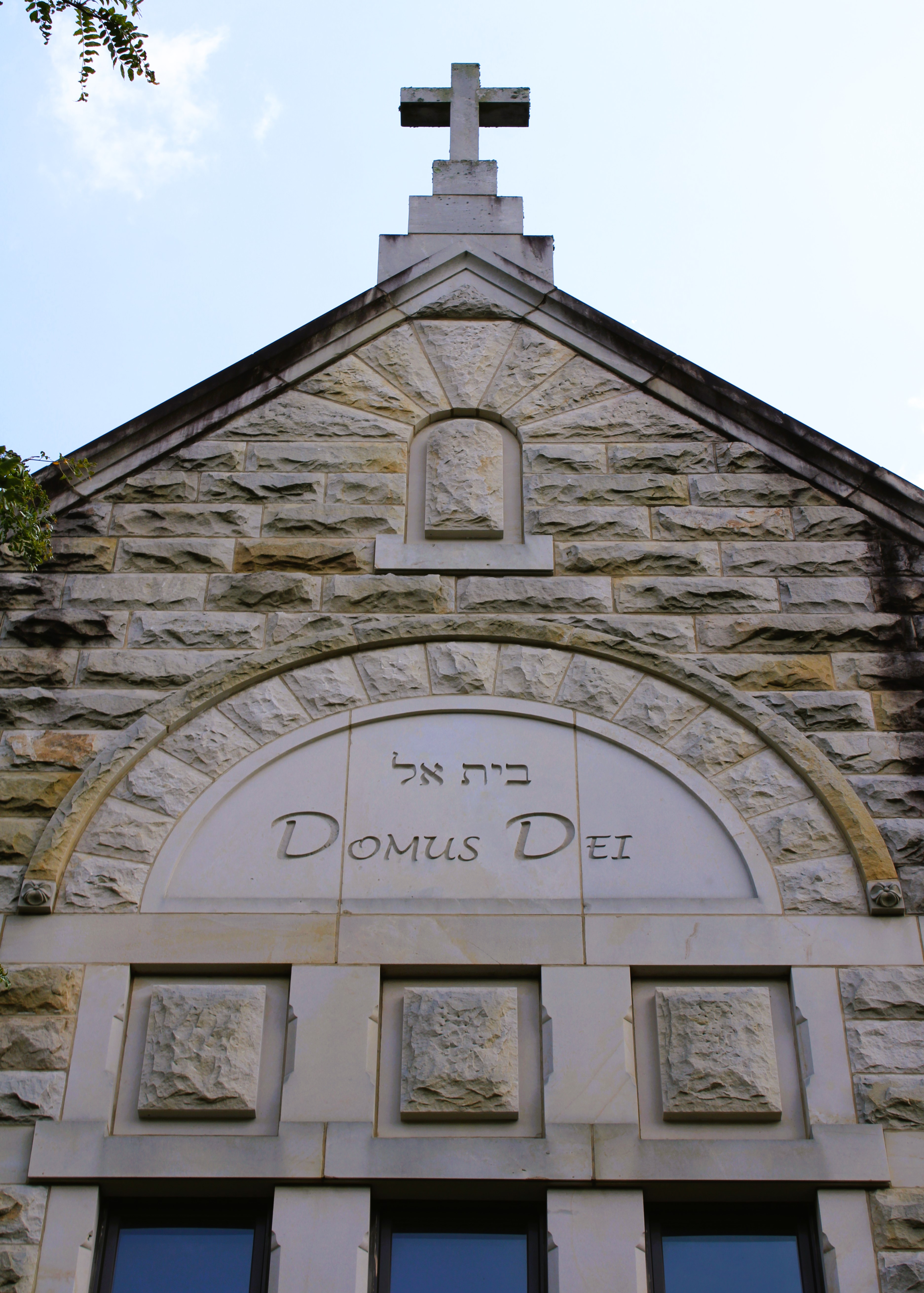
Front entrance (2023)

On October 4, 1974, Pope Paul VI renamed the Diocese of Wheeling as the Diocese of Wheeling-Charleston and designated Sacred Heart Church as the co-cathedral for the diocese. In 1980, the Capuchins left the parish after ministering there for 79 years. A diocesan priest, Edward Sadie, became the cathedral rector.

Various renovation and building projects occurred in the 1980s. The parish initiated a capital fund drive called "Growth In Faith Together" to renovate the cathedral interior and exterior. The project included air-conditioning, cleaning and repairing the stained glass windows and the installation of a Schantz 58-rank, three-manual pipe organ (opus 1765). The parish purchased the former Kanawha Valley Hospital building in Charleston to construct a parking lot and in 1985 dedicated the John XXIII Pastoral Center. New carpeting was installed in the sanctuary and furniture maker Edward Hillenbrand created a new mahogany cathedra, ambo and altar. Bishop Francis B. Schulte dedicated the completed cathedral in 1988.

In 1993, the parish purchased Riverview Terrace for $1.23 million to become a complex for the elderly. The parish joined with the First Presbyterian Church in Charleston to construct two houses for Habitat for Humanity.

During the early 2000s, the parish purchased the parking lot of the Charleston newspaper. It also, remodeled the Cenacle Retreat property for parish office space and apartments for the parish clergy, renaming it the Cordis Center. The parish also renovated Sacred Heart and added a new gathering space to the structure.

=== Basilica of the Co-Cathedral of the Sacred Heart ===
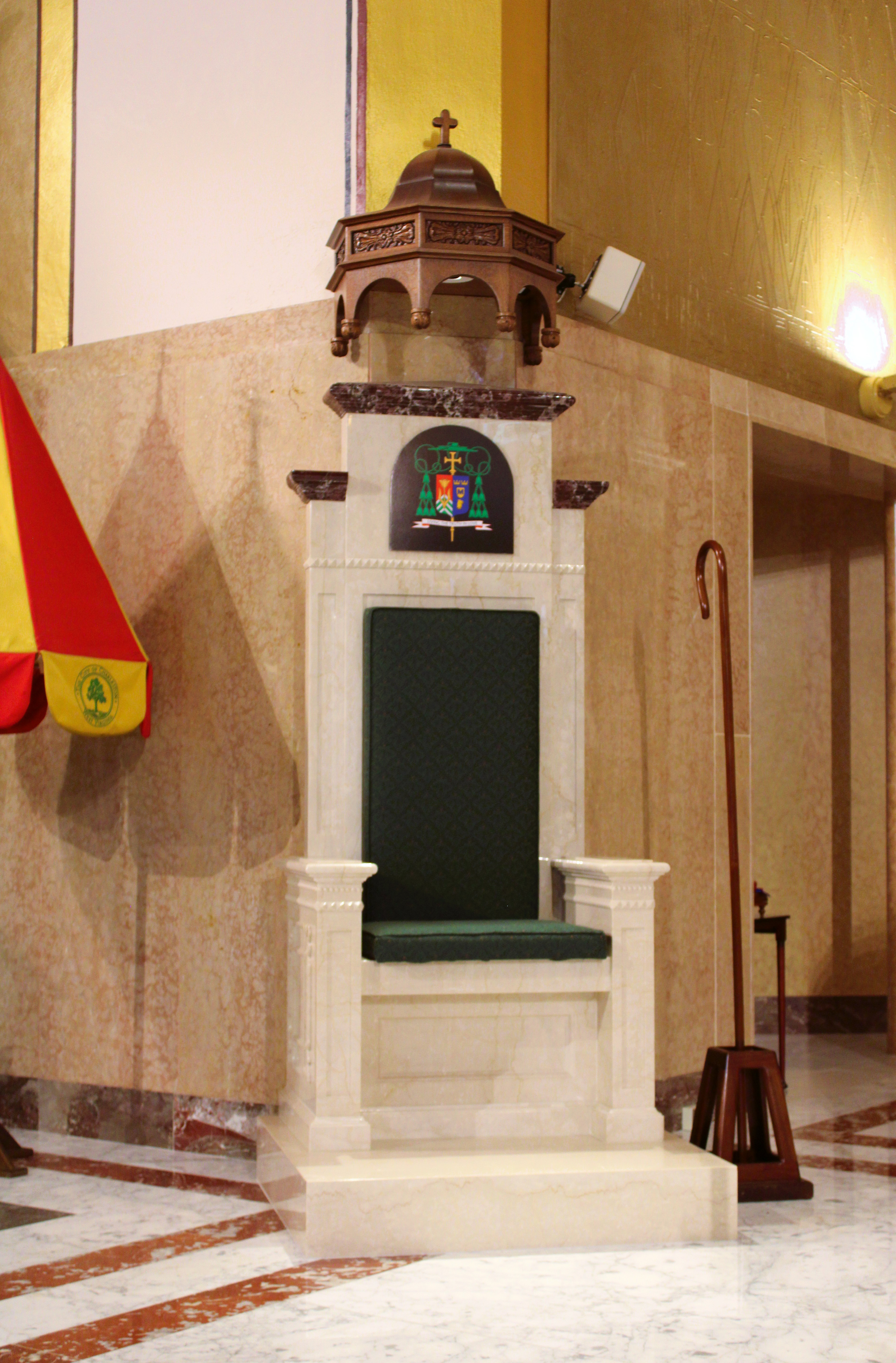
Marble cathedra (2023)

On November 9, 2009, Pope Benedict XVI raised Sacred Heart to a minor basilica. The basilica in 2013 announced that it was converting the Riverview Terrace apartments into condominiums. Current residents were allowed to continue renting their units, but they were faced with significant rent increases. This action prompted a lawsuit against the basilica .

In 2017, Bishop Michael Bransfield began a controversial renovation of the basilica. Using money from a hospital trust fund, Bransfield embarked spent $2.3 million dollars installing marble floors and replacing the mahogany cathedra, ambo and altar with expensive marble ones. He never consulted the hospital board of trustees or basilica officials. Bransfield retired in 2018; a Vatican investigation later criticized his lavish spending along with allegations of sexual abuse against him.

The basilica campus is a contributing property in the Downtown Charleston Historic District on the National Register of Historic Places.

== Cathedral schools ==
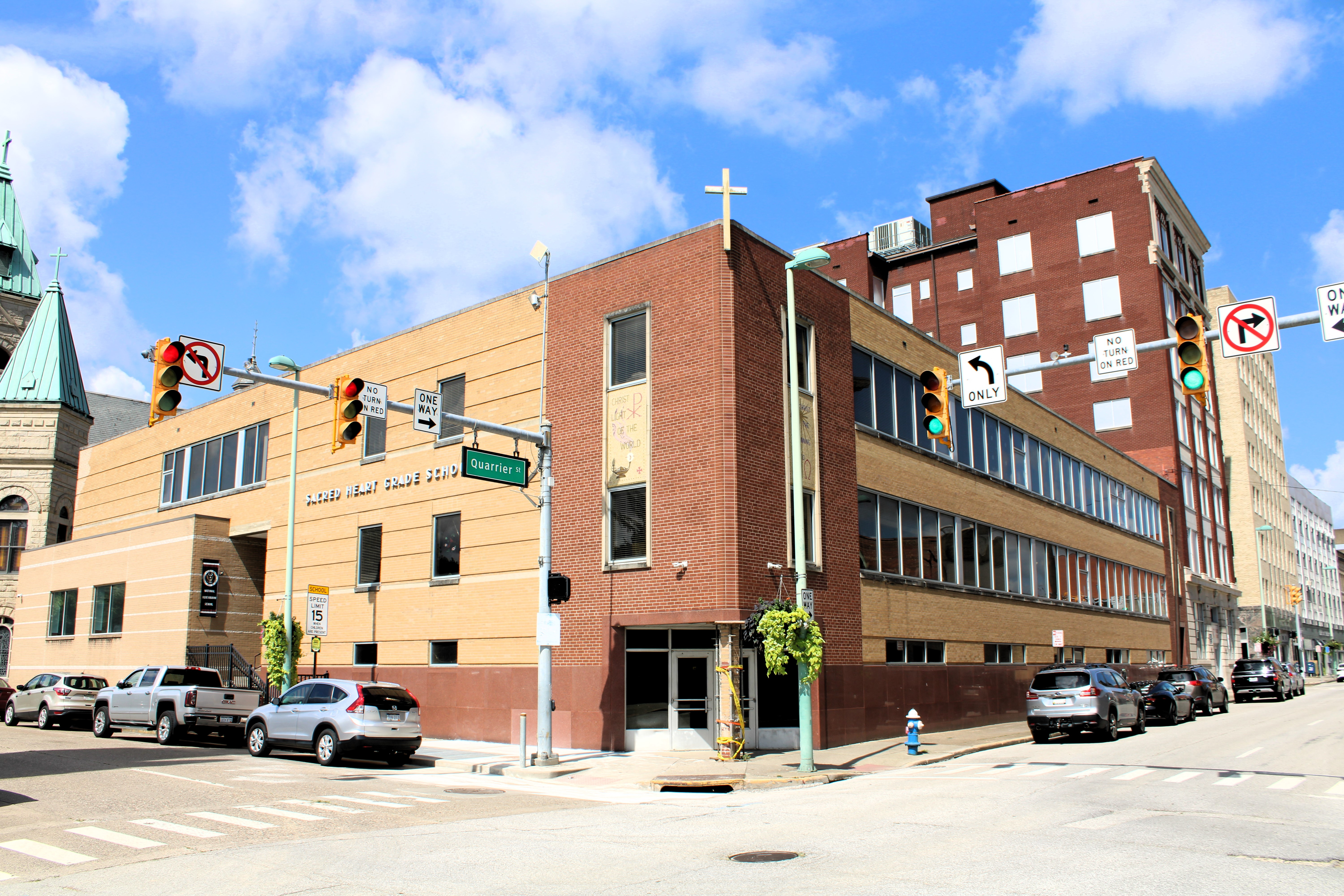
Sacred Heart Grade School

The first school at Sacred Heart opened in 1866 in the Dunbar Building that served as a combination church and school. For the rest of the 19th century the school was in financial trouble. It closed in 1868.

In 1870, the Sisters of St. Joseph reopened the cathedral school. At the same time, they established a boarding school named St. Mary's Academy. The school occupied a new building in 1872, but it closed again in 1892. St. Mary's Academy closed in 1895. The Franciscan Sisters of Penance and Christian Charity reopened the cathedral school in 1903 and constructed a new convent in 1904.

The parish opened a new school building in 1920, and the first high school classes began in 1922. They purchased and renovated a building to house the high school in 1927. Bishop John Swint laid the cornerstone for a new high school in 1940 and the building opened the following year as Charleston Catholic High School. The grade school was remodeled in 1942 and the Dunbar Building, which had served as grade school, convent, rectory for the Capuchins, school, first high school, parish hall, and parish library was demolished. The grade school added kindergarten classes in 1952 and a third floor to the high school building in 1956. The current grade school building opened in 1962 at a cost of $521,140.

The cathedral grade school constructed a new playground in 1986, and renovated Seton Hall in 1990 with classrooms on second and third floors and space for the After School Care Program on the first floor. In the 1990s, the high school initiated a $3.5 million fund drive to fund a new science wing.

Cathedral campus images

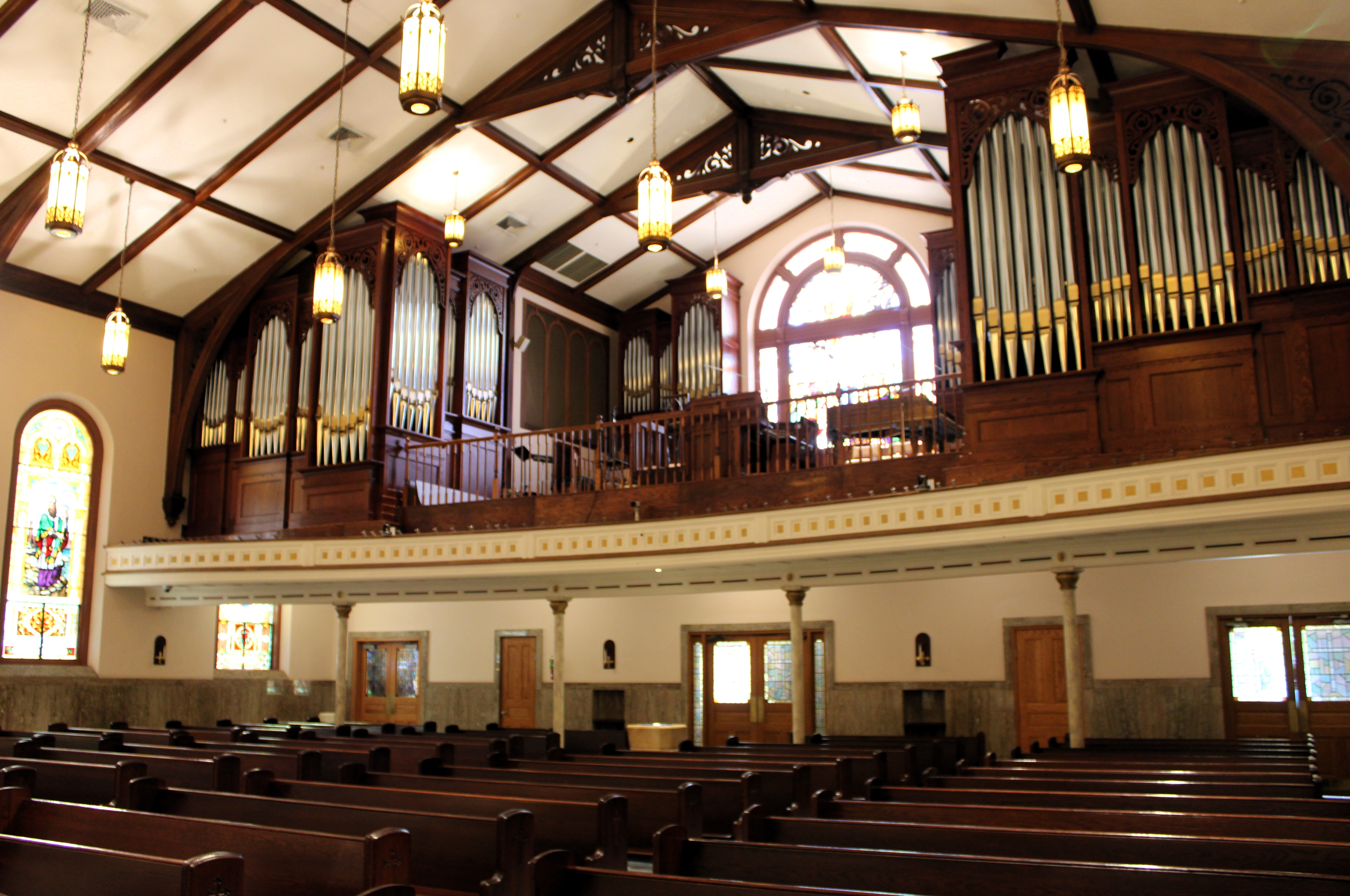
Pipe organ in rear gallery (2023)

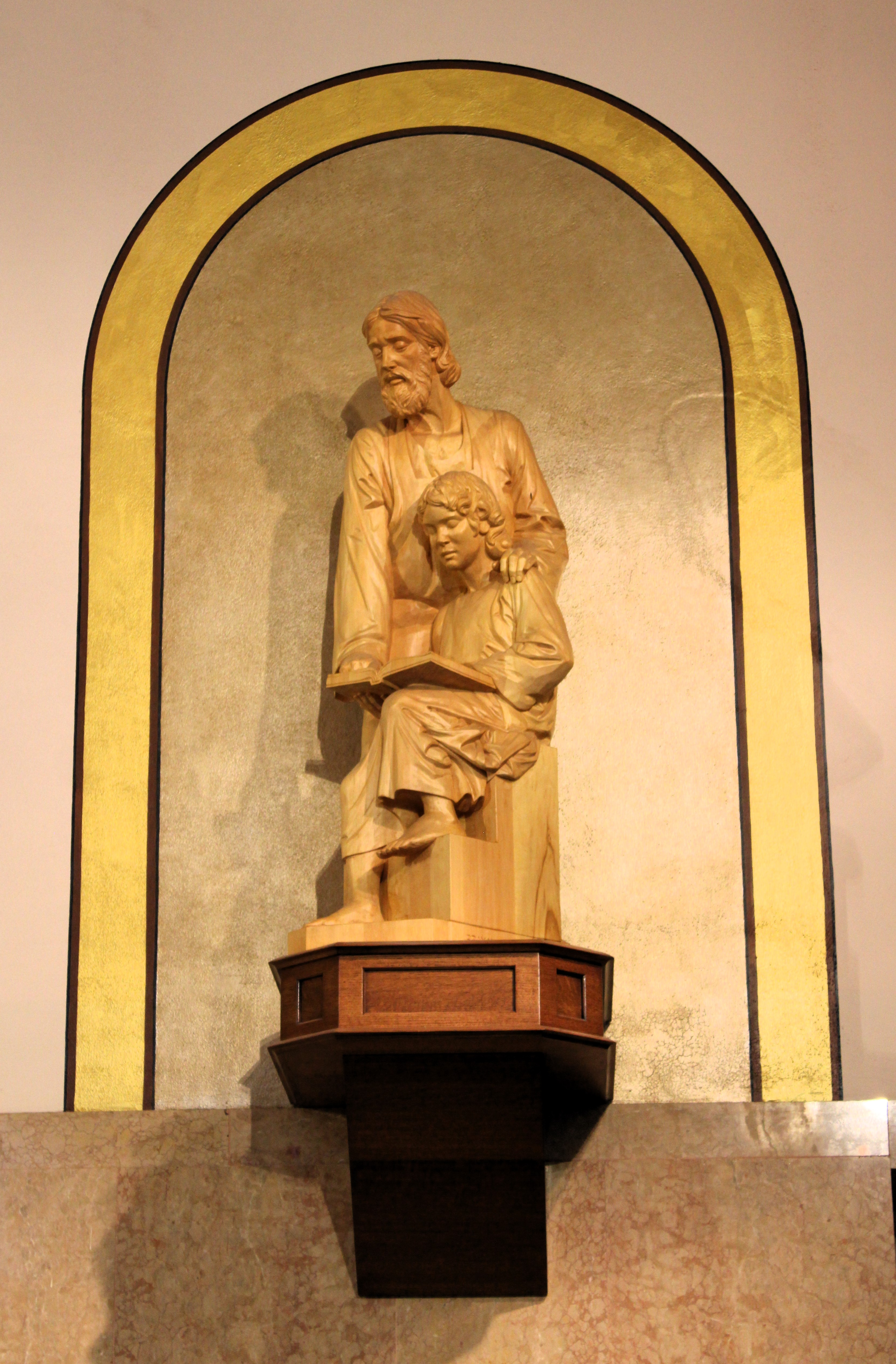
Cathedral shrine (2023)

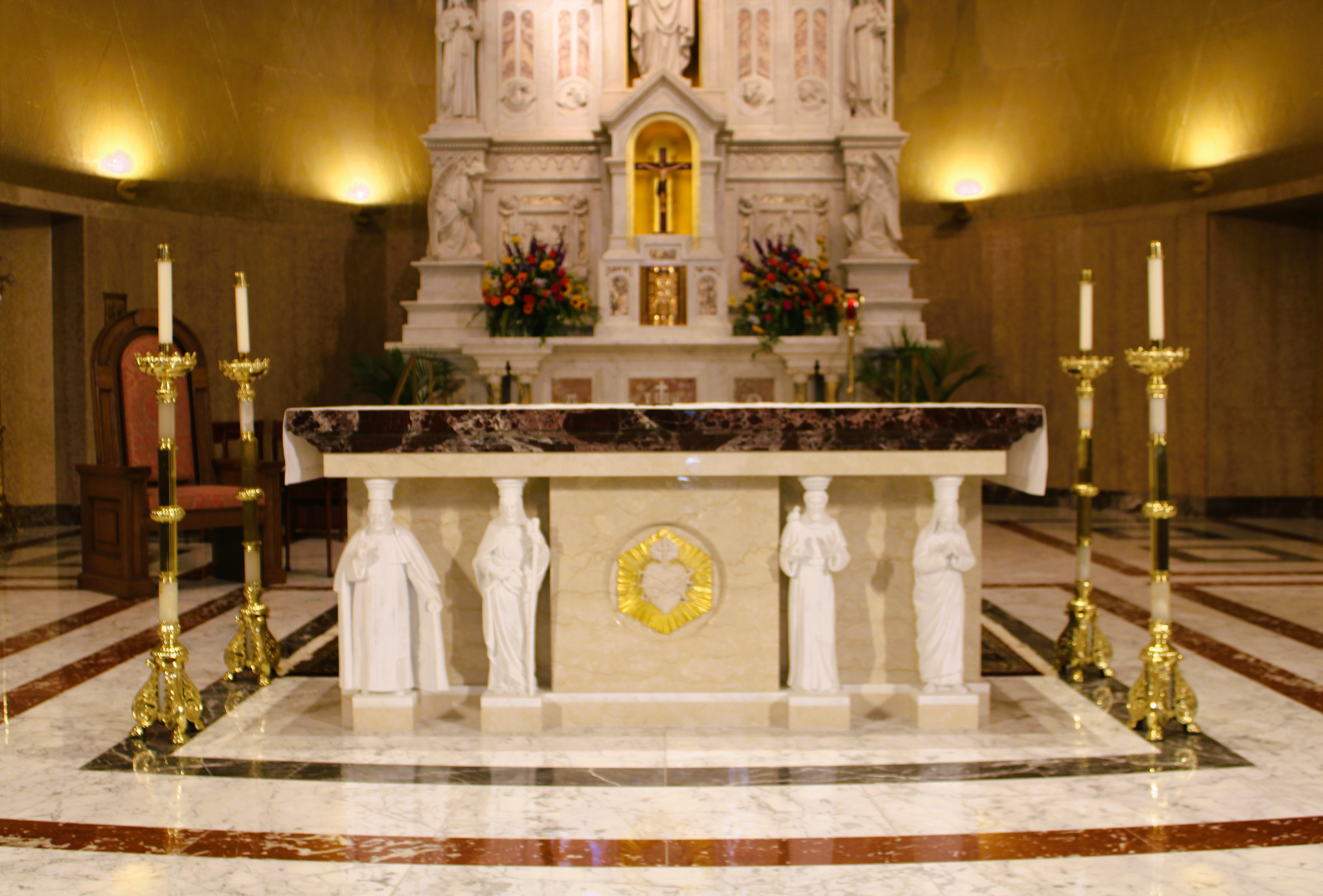
Altar (2023)

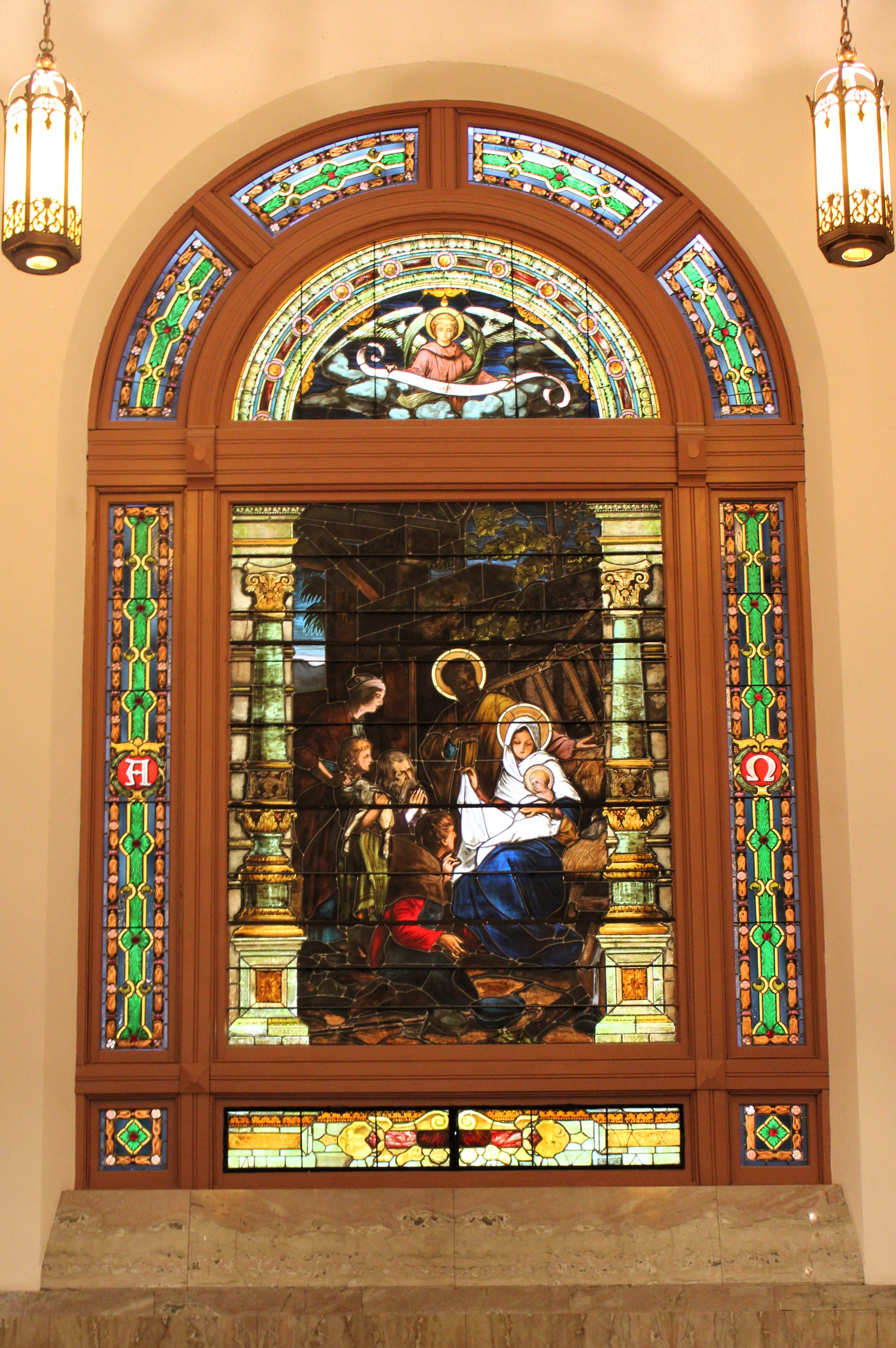
Nativity stained glass window (2023

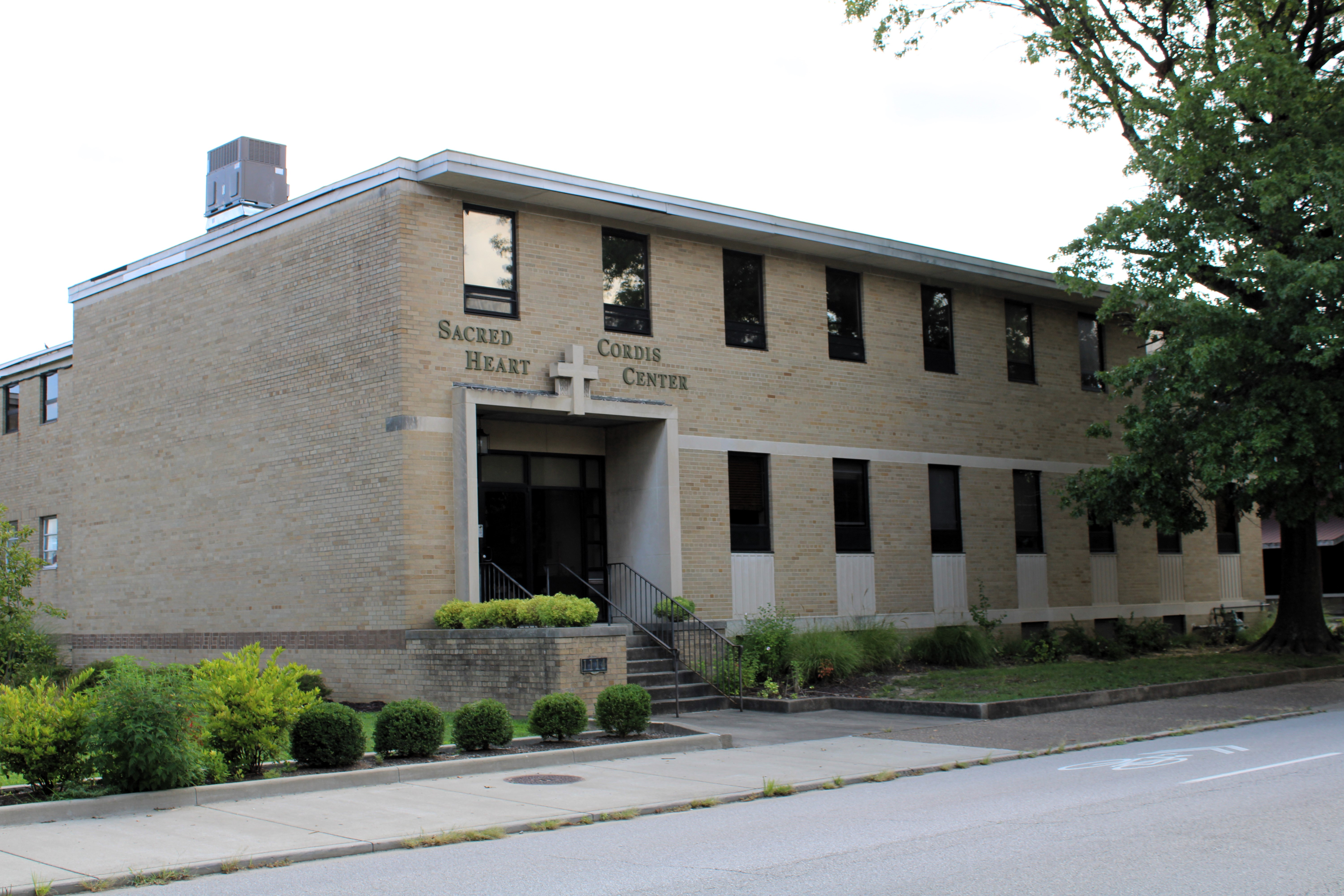
Cordis Center housing rectory and parish offices (2023)

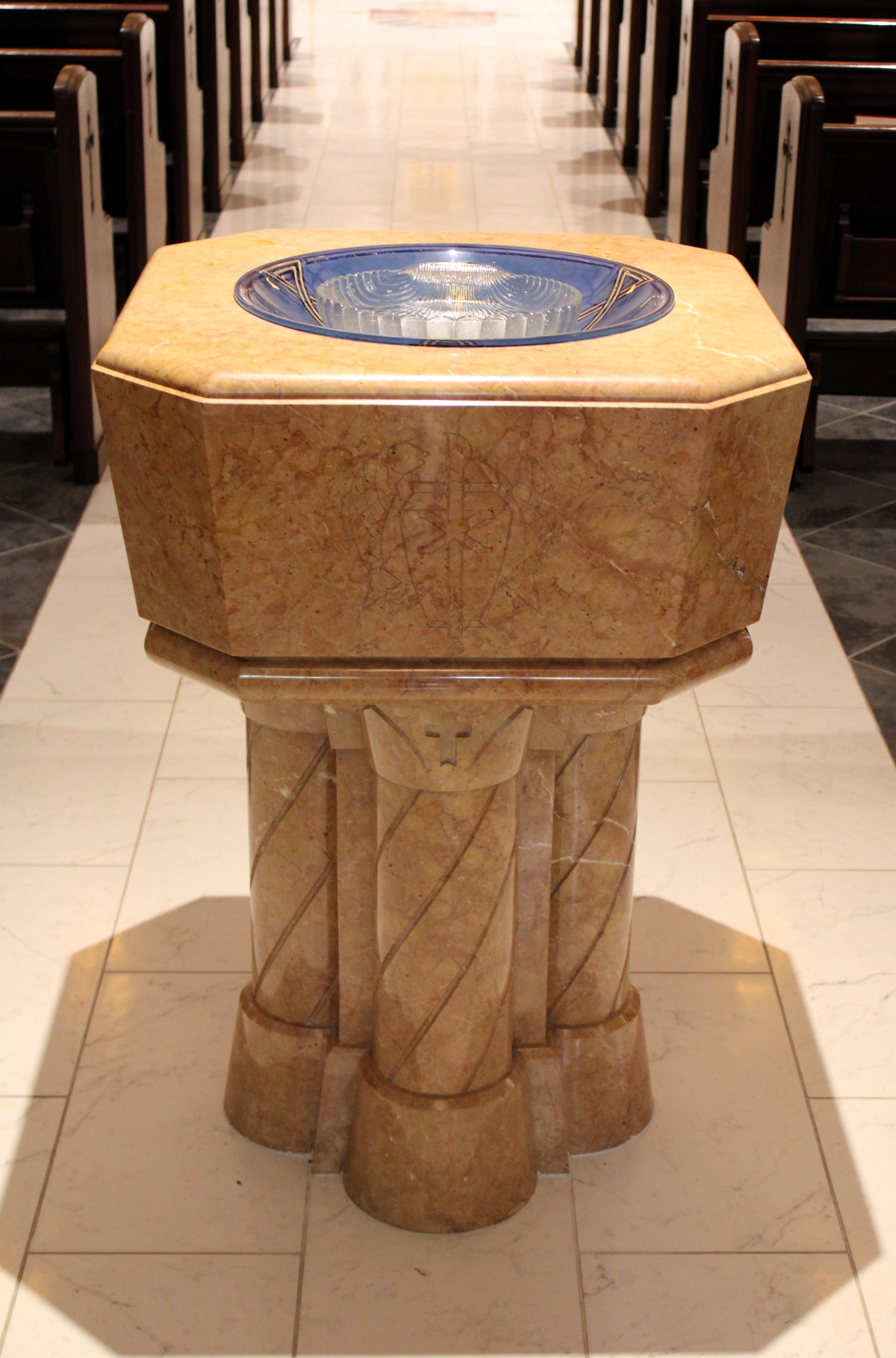
Baptismal font )2023)

== See also ==
- List of Catholic cathedrals in the United States
- List of cathedrals in the United States
