= Peter Richard Kenrick =

Bishop of St. Louis, Missouri and Catholic archbishop west of the Mississippi River

Most Reverend Peter Richard Kenrick
- Archbishop of St. Louis
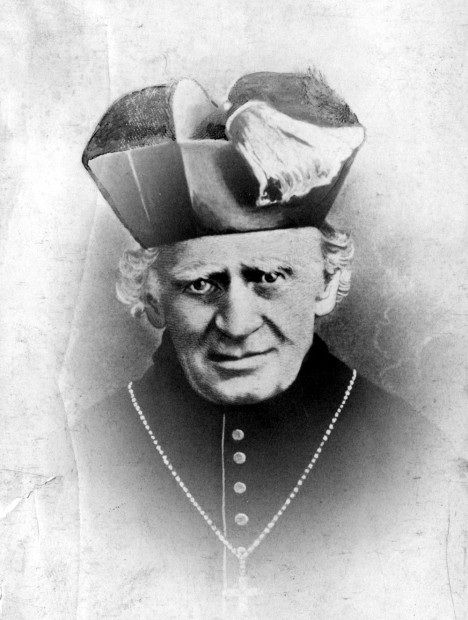
- Church: Catholic Church
- Appointed: July 20, 1847
- Term ended: May 21, 1895
- Predecessor: Joseph Rosati, C.M.
- Successor: John Joseph Kain
- Other posts: Titular Bishop of Draso (1841–1843); Coadjutor bishop of St. Louis (1841–1843); Bishop of St. Louis (1843–1847); Titular Archbishop of Marcianopolis (1895–1896)

Orders
- Ordination: March 6, 1832 by Daniel Murray
- Consecration: November 30, 1841 by Joseph Rosati

Personal details
- Born: September 17, 1806 Dublin, United Kingdom of Great Britain and Ireland
- Died: March 4, 1896 (aged 89) St. Louis, Missouri, US
- Buried: Calvary Cemetery, St. Louis
- Signature: Peter Richard Kenrick's signature

Ordination history of Peter Richard Kenrick
History
Episcopal consecration
- Consecrated by: Joseph Rosati, C.M.
- Date: November 30, 1841
Episcopal succession
Bishops consecrated by Peter Richard Kenrick as principal consecrator
- James Oliver Van de Velde, S.J.: September 16, 1827
- John McGill: July 23, 1850
- John Baptiste Miège, S.J.: March 25, 1851
- Anthony O'Regan: July 25, 1854
- James Duggan: May 3, 1857
- Clement Smyth, O.C.S.O.: May 9, 1857
- James O'Gorman, O.C.S.O.: May 8, 1859
- James Whelan, O.P.: May 8, 1859
- Thomas Langdon Grace, O.P.: July 24, 1859
- Patrick Feehan: November 12, 1865
- John Hennessy: September 30, 1866
- Joseph Melcher: July 12, 1868
- John Joseph Hogan: September 13, 1868
- Patrick John Ryan: April 14, 1872
- Thomas Bonacum: November 30, 1887
- Thomas Bonacum: November 30, 1887
- John Joseph Hennessy: November 30, 1888

Peter Richard Kenrick (August 17, 1806 – March 4, 1896) was an Irish Catholic priest who served as Bishop of St. Louis from 1843 to 1895. The see was made an archdiocese in 1847, when he was called as the first archbishop west of the Mississippi River. The archdiocese covered nearly all the territory of the Louisiana Purchase. He served in this position for nearly 50 years, until months before his death.

Kenrick was born and raised in Dublin, Ireland, where he was educated at Maynooth College and ordained as a priest in 1832. He and his older brother Francis Kenrick both served all their lives as priests and officials in the Catholic Church in the United States. For a time they both served in Philadelphia, Pennsylvania.

== Early life ==
Peter Richard Kenrick was born in Dublin on August 17, 1806 to Thomas Kenrick and Jane Eustace Kenrick. His uncle, Reverend Richard Kenrick, was the curate of a Catholic church in Dublin. Reverend Francis Kenrick, Peter's brother, was also a priest. Thomas Kenrick, who worked as a scrivener, died in 1817.

After Thomas' death, Richard Kenrick helped educate Peter, who soon became a scrivener himself. During this period, Peter Kenrick worked with the poet James Clarence Mangan. Deciding to become a priest also, Peter Kenrick in 1827 entered the Royal College of St. Patrick, the major seminary for the Irish Catholic Church in Maynooth for five years of study.

== Priesthood ==
Peter Kenrick was ordained to the priesthood on March 6, 1832 by Archbishop Daniel Murray of Dublin in chapel at St. Patrick's College. After his ordination, Peter Kenrick served as a curate at St Patrick's Cathedral in Dublin and at a parish church in Rathmines. Francis, who had been serving as coadjutor bishop in the Diocese of Philadelphia since 1830, urged Peter to come work with him. However, Peter would not consider leaving Ireland until their mother died in 1832.

Peter Kenrick embarked from Liverpool, England, on September 4, 1833 on the ship New York. He arrived in New York City on October 7, then immediately proceeded to Philadelphia. Peter then accompanied Francis to the Second Provincial Council, a meeting of bishops in Baltimore, Maryland.

After the council, Peter joined the faculty of the St. Charles Borromeo Seminary in Philadelphia. He and Francis were the only professors. In 1834, Peter Kenrick was named as assistant pastor at St. Mary's Church in Philadelphia. Since the parish trustees had fought with Francis a few years earlier, he wanted someone he could trust on the staff there.

Francis sent Peter to Pittsburgh, Pennsylvania, in November 1837 to investigate the creation of a new diocese there. For the next three months, Peter served as pastor at St. Paul Parish in that city. He reported to Francis that the city was ready for a diocese.

In June 1838, Peter sailed from New York to Ireland. He wanted to recuperate from the harsh winter in Pittsburgh, plus Francis had asked him to recruit more priests and submit his writings to the Vatican for approval. Peter was also considering entering the Jesuits Order. After a month in Ireland, he traveled to London, Lyon in France and finally Rome. After abandoning his plan to become a Jesuit, Peter Kenrick returned to Philadelphia in 1840.

== Coadjutor Bishop of St. Louis ==
On April 4, 1841, Peter Kenrick was appointed coadjutor bishop of the Diocese of Saint Louis by Pope Gregory XVI. The Vatican was sending Bishop Joseph Rosati of Saint Louis to Haiti on a diplomatic mission and he wanted a bishop to run his diocese. Peter was consecrated bishop on November 30, 1841, in Philadelphia at St. Mary's Church by Rosati, with Francis serving as a co-consecrator.

At the time, the Diocese of St. Louis covered vast stretches of the American Great Plains up to the Rocky Mountains. The Catholic population in St. Louis was primarily French, but with growing Irish and German numbers. It had 65 churches and 75 Native American missions.

Arriving in St. Louis in December 1841, Peter soon discovered that the diocese was deeply in debt due to the construction of its cathedral. The diocese also needed more priests and more churches to serve its growing population. One of his first actions was to celebrate masses in the cathedral in English instead of French to assist the growing English-speaking population. He also tried to recruit a German-speaking priest. He sold off some church properties and successfully solicited donations from Catholic societies in Austria-Hungary and France.

Peter in 1842 visited southern Missouri and Arkansas, then went west to Kansas City. He performed confirmations on 300 Potawatomi converts near present-day Sugar Creek, Kansas. Kenrick's travels convinced him that the Vatican needed to erect new dioceses in these areas if the Catholic Church was going to flourish. In April 1843, Peter attended the Fifth Provincial Council in Baltimore, where the bishops decided to ask the Vatican to create new dioceses in Chicago, Milwaukee and Little Rock, reducing the size of the Diocese of St. Louis.

== Bishop of St. Louis ==
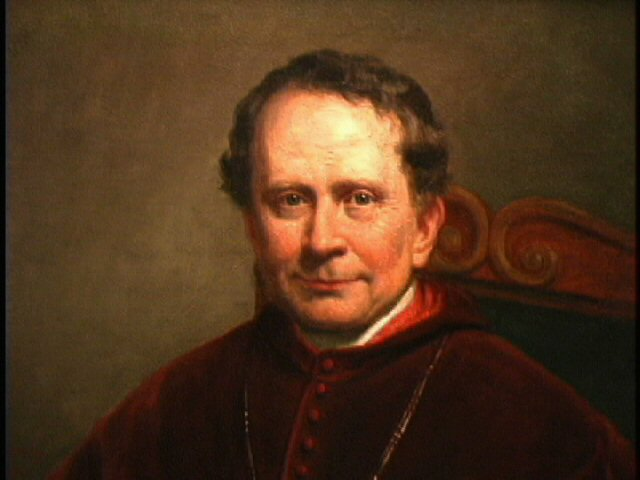
Bishop Francis Kenrick

In 1843, after several months of illness, Rosati died in Rome. Peter Kenrick automatically succeeded him on September 25, 1843 as the third bishop of St. Louis. By this time, an economic downturn in St. Louis had made the diocesan finances fragile again. He expressed frustration with the lack of understanding in Rome of the problems inherent with a frontier diocese.

Peter founded a Catholic newspaper for the diocese, the Catholic Cabinet, in 1843. It lasted for two years. He attended the Sixth Provincial Council in 1846, where he was invited to deliver a memorial speech for the deceased bishops. Having received sizable donations from Europe and recruited more priests from the there, the diocese was now in better shape.

=== Archbishop of St. Louis ===
On July 20, 1847, Pope Pius IX elevated the Diocese of St. Louis to an archdiocese, with Peter as its first archbishop. Some bishops believed that Francis had pushed the Vatican to elevate St. Louis, but he denied it.

Kenrick made frequent visits to parishes outside of St. Louis. On some occasions, his audience was composed primarily of curious Protestants. He sometimes brought a German-speaking priest with him if he anticipated addressing a German congregation. During the summer of 1849, a cholera epidemic broke out in St. Louis. Peter spent considerable time visiting the sick in hospitals. That same year, he attended the Seventh Provincial Council in Baltimore.

By this time, Peter's relationships with the Jesuits had deteriorated. He believed that they were neglecting their missions for Native Americans in the west and were spending too much money on institutions in St. Louis. The Jesuits felt that Peter was jealous of their success in gaining converts to Catholicism. However, the Jesuit provincial eventually smoothed out their relationship with Peter.

With the onset of the American Civil War in 1860, Missouri was bitterly divided between loyalists to the US Government and those favoring the Confederate States of America. Peter ordered his priests to stay away from political involvement and maintained a strict neutrality on the issue. An investigation by the Archdiocese in 2024 indicated its clergy, including Peter, owned as many as 70 enslaved individuals up until the end of the war. In July 1863, Francis died in Baltimore. When the city authorities ordered the flying of the American flag from all churches, Peter refused.

With end of the war in 1865, the Missouri Constitutional Convention, passed a measure requiring all clergy in the state to take a so-called "ironclad oath" to the US Government. Peter banned his clergy from taking the oath. One priest, Reverend John A. Cummings, went to jail rather than comply with law. He filed a suit, supported by Peter and Protestant clergy, that reached the United States Supreme Court. It ruled that it was unconstitutional for the government to demand that people take this oath.

In 1866, while traveling to the Second Plenary Council in Baltimore, Peter stopped in Newport, Rhode Island, to spend some time by ocean, then visited Montreal, Quebec.

== Later life ==
After harassment by his detractors and members of the curia made life difficult for him, Kenrick turned over the administration of the archdiocese to his coadjutor bishop, Patrick John Ryan, in 1871. When Ryan was appointed Archbishop of Philadelphia, Kenrick took back active administration of the archdiocese.

During the period when the Knights of Labor, a strongly Roman Catholic labor union and the first national labor union, turned to violence in seeking their goals, Peter vocally opposed them and condemned their actions. However, the higher-ranking Cardinal James Gibbons, the Archbishop of Baltimore, overruled his objections.

In 1893, Kenrick's attempt to name his coadjutor bishop failed when his nominee did not win the support of his fellow bishops. The Vatican named Bishop John Joseph Kain from the Diocese of Wheeling to fill the role instead. Kenrick's conflicts and failed communication with Kain lent a note of discord to his final years. While Kenrick continued as archbishop, Kain administered the archdiocese.

With advancing age, Kenrick became increasingly infirm. In 1895, Pope Leo XIII removed Peter from ministry due to his increasing dementia.

== Death and legacy ==
Peter Kenrick died on March 4, 1896. One cardinal, eight archbishops, 20 bishops and 400 priests attended his funeral. He is buried in Calvary Cemetery in St. Louis. Kenrick had established this cemetery on the property of a farm he bought.

The seminary of the Archdiocese of St. Louis, Kenrick-Glennon Seminary, formerly known as Kenrick Theological Seminary, is named in his honor.

== Publications ==
- The Holy House of Loretto (1840)
- The Month of Mary (1840)
- Validity of Anglican Ordinations examined (1841)

Catholic Church titles
Preceded by Bishop Joseph Rosati	Archbishop of St. Louis; 1843–1895	Succeeded by John Joseph Kain
