= John Joseph Kain =

American Catholic bishop

The Most Reverend John Joseph Kain
- Archbishop of St. Louis
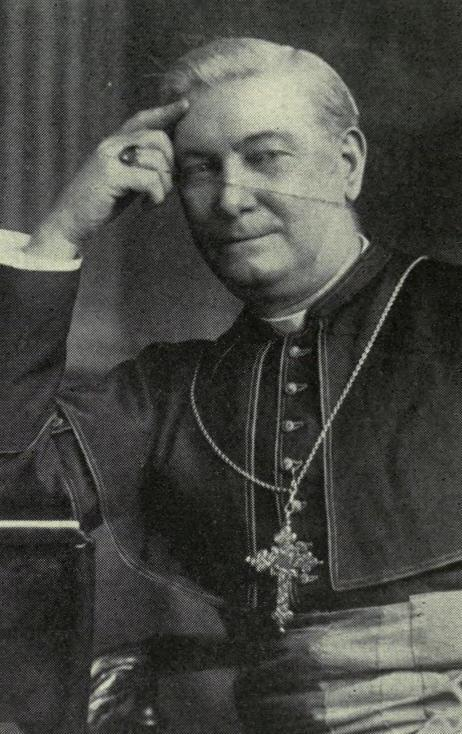
- Church: Catholic Church
- Archdiocese: St. Louis
- Installed: May 21, 1895
- Term ended: October 13, 1903
- Predecessor: Peter Richard Kenrick
- Successor: John J. Glennon
- Previous posts: Coadjutor Archbishop of St. Louis (1893–1895); Bishop of Wheeling (1875–1893)

Orders
- Ordination: July 2, 1866 by Martin John Spalding
- Consecration: May 23, 1875 by James Roosevelt Bayley

Personal details
- Born: March 1840 Martinsburg, Virginia, U.S.
- Died: October 13, 1903 (aged 63) Baltimore, Maryland, U.S.
- Education: St. Charles College; St. Mary's Seminary
- Motto: Pro Deo Et Patria (Latin for 'For God and Country')

John Joseph Kain (March 1840 (Note: While some sources give a birth date of May 31, 1841, his baptism record indicates that he was baptized on that date but born in March 1840.) – October 13, 1903) was an American prelate of the Catholic Church. He served as Bishop of Wheeling from 1875 to 1893 and as Archbishop of St. Louis from 1895 until his death in 1903.

== Early life and education ==
John Kain was born in March 1840 in Martinsburg, Virginia, which is now part of West Virginia. He was the son of Jeremiah and Ellen (née Murphy) Kain. His parents were Irish immigrants from County Cork, and his father worked for the Baltimore and Ohio Railroad. He was baptized on May 31, 1841, by Father Richard Vincent Whelan, whom Kain would later succeed as Bishop of Wheeling. At his confirmation, he took the middle name Joseph.

Kain received his early education at Martinsburg Academy, where he was taught by Thomas Becker. At the age of sixteen, he enrolled at St. Charles College, a minor seminary in Ellicott City, Maryland. There, he established a lifelong friendship with one of his classmates, John J. Keane. He then continued his studies at St. Mary's Seminary in Baltimore, earning a baccalaureate in theology maxima cum laude. While Kain prepared for the priesthood, one of his sisters joined the Sisters of Charity.

== Priesthood ==
On July 2, 1866, Kain was ordained a priest by Archbishop Martin John Spalding in Baltimore. His first and only assignment as a priest was as pastor of St. Peter's Church in Harpers Ferry, West Virginia. At the time, the parish covered eight counties in West Virginia and four counties in Virginia. He dedicated most of his tenure to restoring Catholic communities after Civil War, repairing churches at Harpers Ferry and Martinsburg and entirely rebuilding churches at Winchester and Berkeley Springs.

== Episcopal career ==
=== Diocese of Wheeling ===
Following the death of Bishop Whelan (who had baptized Kain as a child) of the Diocese of Wheeling in July 1874, Kain was appointed to succeed him as the second Bishop of Wheeling by Pope Pius IX on February 12, 1875. He received his episcopal consecration on the following May 23 from Archbishop James Roosevelt Bayley at the Cathedral of St. Joseph, with Bishops Thomas Becker (Kain's former teacher) and James Gibbons serving as co-consecrators.

At the beginning of Kain's tenure in 1875, the Diocese of Wheeling contained 29 priests and 48 churches to serve a Catholic population of 18,000. By the end of his tenure in 1893, there were 35 priests, 64 churches, and 20,000 Catholics.

Although Kain would become a longtime ally of Bishop Gibbons of the Diocese of Richmond (later archbishop of Baltimore and a cardinal), they had a dispute over their diocesan boundaries early into Kain's tenure in Wheeling. At the time, the Diocese of Wheeling covered all of West Virginia except for eight counties, which belonged to the Diocese of Richmond; meanwhile, the Diocese of Richmond included all of Virginia except for 18 counties that belonged to the Diocese of Wheeling. In 1876, Kain petitioned the Holy See to adjust the two dioceses to align with state boundaries. Gibbons objected to this proposal, refusing to cede the "most populous Catholic territory" of the eastern panhandle of West Virginia and pointing out that Martinsburg was closer to Richmond than Wheeling. Consequently, the Holy See declined to change the diocesan boundaries; it would not be until 1974 that Wheeling's Virginia territory was given to Richmond and Richmond's West Virginia territory was given to Wheeling.

Kain attended the third Plenary Council of Baltimore (1884), where he took a prominent role in discussions on the Baltimore Catechism, clerical trials, and spiritual care of immigrants.

=== Archdiocese of St. Louis ===
By 1892, Archbishop Peter Richard Kenrick was 86 years old and had led the Archdiocese of St. Louis for 49 years. In November of that year, a terna, or list of candidates, for a coadjutor archbishop to Kenrick was submitted by the priests of the archdiocese—including Kain, Bishop John Lancaster Spalding of Peoria, and Bishop Edward Fitzgerald of Little Rock. The bishops of the archdiocese also submitted a terna, including Kain, Spalding, and Bishop Silas Chatard of Indianapolis. Cardinal Gibbons strongly recommended Kain to the Holy See, as Spalding did not want the position and Chatard had not been supported by the St. Louis clergy. On June 16, 1893, Pope Leo XIII named Kain as coadjutor to Kenrick with the honorary position of titular archbishop of Oxyrynchus.

Upon his arrival in St. Louis, however, Kain had a contentious relationship with Kenrick. Kenrick had originally wanted the vicar general of the archdiocese to become his coadjutor but had been overruled by his fellow clergy. He also did not appreciate it when Kain took up quarters in the archbishop's residence. Kain exercised limited authority until December 1893, when the Holy See named him apostolic administrator of the archdiocese. Kenrick later resigned on May 21, 1895, and Kain automatically succeeded him as the second Archbishop of St. Louis. After the Italian-born Joseph Rosati and the Irish-born Kenrick, Kain was the first American-born leader of the Archdiocese of St. Louis.

At the beginning of Kain's tenure in 1895, the Archdiocese of St. Louis contained 312 priests, 231 churches, 128 parochial schools, nine hospitals, three orphanages, and a Catholic population of 200,000. By the end of his tenure in 1903, there were 437 priests, 252 churches, 141 parochial schools, 16 hospitals, seven orphanages, and 220,000 Catholics. In 1893, he opened Kenrick Seminary. While he did not live long enough to see the completion of the Cathedral of St. Louis, he purchased the property on Lindell Boulevard for a new cathedral.

== Death and legacy ==
In 1903, as his health began to fail, Kain requested a coadjutor archbishop and submitted a terna to the Holy See including Bishops John J. Glennon of Kansas City, Edward Joseph Dunne of Dallas, and Sebastian Gebhard Messmer of Green Bay. Glennon was appointed in April of that year.

The next month, in May 1903, Kain took up residence at St. Agnes Hospital in Baltimore. He remained there for five months, dying on October 10 at the age of 63. His Requiem Mass was celebrated by Cardinal Gibbons, with Archbishop Keane delivering the eulogy. He is buried in Calvary Cemetery.

Rosati-Kain Academy in St. Louis is partially named in his honor.

== Views ==
In the 1913 Catholic Encyclopedia, Kain was described as "an admirable exemplar of progressive conservatism and conservative progressiveness."

During the late 19th century, Catholic bishops of the United States were generally divided between liberals, like Cardinal Gibbons and Archbishop John Ireland, who supported reform and adapting the Church to American values; and conservatives, like Archbishop Michael Corrigan and Bishop Bernard John McQuaid, who favored strict adherence to Vatican policies and traditions. Kain was generally aligned with the liberal faction. After Rev. David Phelan, pastor of Our Lady of Mount Carmel in St. Louis and editor of The Western Watchman, repeatedly denounced "[Archbishop] Ireland and his clique," Kain suspended his newspaper. Furthermore, when Kain was being considered for a post in the Archdiocese of San Francisco in 1883, the conservative Bishop McQuaid wrote to Cardinal Giovanni Simeoni that Kain was "childish in his manner [and] frivolous in spirit"; McQuaid also said that Kain "has a great deal of backbone" in a 1894 letter to Archbishop Corrigan.

Kain took a tolerant view of secret societies, which the Church generally considered as incompatible with Catholic doctrine. In 1890, a Catholic newspaper printed a quote from Kain saying that Freemasonry in France and Italy was the enemy of Christianity but, in the United States and England, was essentially Christian. Given the papal ban of Freemasonry, Cardinal Simeoni of the Congregation for the Propagation of the Faith consequently asked Cardinal Gibbons to investigate the matter; Gibbons later told Simeoni that Kain had repudiated his statement. In 1894, the Holy Office condemned the Odd Fellows, Sons of Temperance, and Knights of Pythias. However, Kain refused to publish the decree in the Archdiocese of St. Louis, writing to Gibbons that "the majority of [bishops] were opposed to the condemnation of those societies."

== Sources ==
- Rothensteiner, John E. (1928). History of the Archdiocese of St. Louis. Vol. II.

Catholic Church titles
Preceded by Richard Vincent Whelan	Bishop of Wheeling; 1875–1893	Succeeded by Patrick James Donahue
Preceded by Peter Richard Kenrick	Archbishop of St. Louis; 1893–1903	Succeeded by John J. Glennon
