= Parkersburg Catholic High School =

Location
- 3201 Fairview Avenue; Parkersburg, (Wood County), West Virginia 26104-2111; United States; 39°16′53″N 81°31′20″W

Information
- Type: Private, Coeducational
- Motto: Empowered by Knowledge, Transformed by Faith
- Religious affiliation: Roman Catholic
- Established: 1958
- Oversight: Diocese of Wheeling-Charleston
- Grades: 6–12
- Average class size: 12
- Hours in school day: 7
- Colors: Navy Blue and White
- Athletics: Basketball,Track, Cross Country, Soccer, Volleyball, Tennis, Golf, Cheer
- Athletics conference: Little Kanawha Conference
- Mascot: Crusader
- Team name: Crusaders
- Rival: St. Marys, Williamstown, Wirt Co.
- Accreditation: North Central Association of Colleges and Schools
- Tuition: $9,322 depending on student's faith
- Communities served: Wood County, WV; Washington County, OH; (Mid-Ohio Valley)
- Athletic Director: Larry Thompson
- Website: https://parkersburgcatholic.com/

Parkersburg Catholic High School is a private, Roman Catholic high school in Parkersburg, West Virginia. It is part of the Roman Catholic Diocese of Wheeling-Charleston.

== History ==
Parkersburg Catholic was opened in 1950, located at the corner of 9th and Juliana Sts. It was moved to a new site on Fairview Ave. in 1958. It was the first Catholic high school in the area. Originally known as St. Francis Xavier High School, the name was changed to its present name in 1954. It began with its highest level as the 9th Grade, then expanded each year thereafter. It now hosts grades 6–12, with 80 students enrolled on average.

Hail to alma mater hail,
Never will our loyalties fail,
Hardships and studies,
Laughter and buddies,
Make us one,
Never will the memories die,
Through the years of days by,
We will be true forever,
To Parkersburg Catholic High.

== Notable alumni ==
- Mary Ostrowski, former U.S. National Team gold medalist, West Virginia Sports Hall of Fame.
