= Mark E. Brennan =

American Catholic prelate (born 1947)

His Excellency, The Most Reverend Mark E. Brennan
- Bishop Emeritus of Wheeling-Charleston
- Diocese: Wheeling-Charleston
- Appointed: July 23, 2019
- Installed: August 22, 2019
- Retired: May 1, 2026
- Predecessor: Michael J. Bransfield
- Successor: Evelio Menjivar-Ayala
- Previous posts: Auxiliary Bishop of Baltimore and Titular Bishop of Rusibisir (2017-2019)

Orders
- Ordination: May 15, 1976 by William Wakefield Baum
- Consecration: January 19, 2017 by William E. Lori, Edwin Frederick O'Brien, and Donald Wuerl

Personal details
- Born: February 6, 1947 (age 79) Boston, Massachusetts, US
- Education: Brown University; Christ the King Seminary; Pontifical Gregorian University
- Motto: Living the truth in love
- Styles
- Reference style: His Excellency; The Most Reverend
- Spoken style: Your Excellency
- Religious style: Bishop

Mark Edward Brennan (born February 6, 1947) is an American Catholic prelate who served as Bishop of Wheeling-Charleston from 2019 to 2026. He previously served as an auxiliary bishop for the Archdiocese of Baltimore from 2017 to 2019.

== Biography ==
=== Early years ===
Brennan was born on February 6, 1947, in Boston, Massachusetts. He attended public elementary and junior high schools before attending St. Anthony Catholic School in Washington, D.C. He received a Bachelor of Arts degree in history in 1969 from Brown University in Providence, Rhode Island.

By the time he graduated from Brown in 1969, Brennan had decided to become a priest. He completed one year of philosophy studies at Christ the King Seminary in Buffalo, New York, before assuming residence at the Pontifical North American College in Rome in 1970. He earned a Bachelor of Sacred Theology degree in 1973 and a Master of Theology degree in 1974 from the Pontifical Gregorian University in Rome. Brennan was ordained to the diaconate on May 10, 1973, in Rome.

After returning to the United States, Brennan served diaconal assignments at the following parishes:

- Our Lady Queen of Peace in Washington in the summer of 1973
- St. Aloysius in Leonardtown, Maryland, from 1974 to 1975
- St. John in Clinton, Maryland, from 1975 to 1976

=== Priestly ministry ===
Brennan was ordained to the priesthood for the Archdiocese of Washington by Archbishop William Baum at the Cathedral of St. Matthew the Apostle in Washington on May 15, 1976. After his ordination, the archdiocese assigned Brennan as parochial vicar in the following Maryland parishes:

- Our Lady of Mercy, Potomac (1976–1981). From 1978 to 1981, he also served on the priest council.
- St. Pius X, Bowie (1981–1985)

In 1985, the archdiocese sent Brennan to the Dominican Republic and Colombia to study Spanish language and their cultures for one year. After returning to Maryland, he was appointed parochial vicar of St. Bartholomew Parish in Bethesda. After two years at St. Bartholomew, Archbishop James Aloysius Hickey named Brennan as the director of priestly vocations. He would hold that position for the next ten years.

Brennan was named pastor of St. Thomas the Apostle Parish in Washington in 1998. That same year, the archdiocese appointed him to the college of consultors for a three-year term. In 2003, Brennan was transferred to the pastorate of St. Martin of Tours Parish in Gaithersburg, Maryland. He remained at St. Martin's until his consecration as bishop.

Brennan's other archdiocese posts included:

- member of the college of consultors a second time, 2011 to 2016
- Vicar Forane, 2002 to 2005
- advocate on the metropolitan tribune, 2006

== Episcopal career ==
=== Auxiliary Bishop of Baltimore ===
Coat of arms as auxiliary bishop of Baltimore

Pope Francis appointed Brennan as auxiliary bishop of Baltimore and titular bishop of Rusibisir on December 5, 2016. He was consecrated at the Cathedral of Mary Our Queen in Baltimore by Archbishop William E. Lori on January 19, 2017.

=== Bishop of Wheeling-Charleston ===
On July 23, 2019, Francis named Brennan as bishop of Wheeling-Charleston to succeed Bishop Michael J. Bransfield. Bransfield had retired in 2018, having been sanctioned by the Vatican "for financial crimes and sexual harassment". Brennan was installed at Wheeling's Cathedral of Saint Joseph on August 22, 2019. Asked in 2019 to comment about Bransfield's personal spending using church funds, Brennan said:

Self-indulgence by a bishop, a pastor or anybody else by the Church is just not right. That’s the people’s money. We’re supposed to use the resources people give for the good of the mission of the Church. That’s the point of collecting all of these funds. We’re not supposed to be using the resource of the Church for self-indulgent purposes, and that can take many different forms.

In November 2019, at the request of Francis, Brennan submitted a plan of amends to Bransfield that called him to repay $792,000 to the diocese. Bransfield had previously failed to submit his own plan of amends to the Vatican. In August 2020, the diocese settled a lawsuit brought by several men who had accused Bransfield of sexual assaulting them. The details of the settlement were not released.

Brennan in February 2021 reinstated the diocesan pastoral council, a lay-people advisory group that had been disbanded by Bransfield. In 2022, having reached age 75, Brennan submitted his resignation to the Vatican as bishop of Wheeling-Charleston, as dictated by canon law.

On May 1, 2026, Pope Leo XIV accepted Brennan's resignation and announced Evelio Menjivar-Ayala, Auxiliary Bishop for the Archdiocese of Washington, as Brennan's successor.

== See also ==
- Catholic Church hierarchy
- Catholic Church in the United States
- Historical list of the Catholic bishops of the United States
- List of Catholic bishops of the United States
- Lists of patriarchs, archbishops, and bishops

Catholic Church titles
Preceded by Michael J. Bransfield	Bishop of Wheeling–Charleston; 2019–2026	Succeeded by Evelio Menjivar-Ayala
Preceded by –	Auxiliary Bishop of Baltimore; 2017–2019	Succeeded by –
