= John McGill (bishop) =

American Catholic prelate (1908–1872)

His Excellency, The Right Reverend John McGill
- Bishop of Richmond
- Church: Roman Catholic Church
- See: Richmond
- In office: November 10, 1850– January 14, 1872
- Predecessor: Richard Vincent Whelan
- Successor: James Gibbons

Orders
- Ordination: May 1, 1835 by John Baptist Mary David
- Consecration: November 10, 1850 by Peter Richard Kenrick

Personal details
- Born: November 4, 1809 Philadelphia, Pennsylvania, USA
- Died: January 14, 1872 (aged 62) Richmond, Virginia, USA
- Education: St. Joseph's College
- Motto: In fide vivo (I live in faith)

John McGill (November 4, 1809 – January 14, 1872) was an American prelate of the Roman Catholic Church. He served as bishop of the Diocese of Richmond in Virginia from 1850 until his death in 1872.

== Biography ==
=== Early life ===
The oldest of ten children, John McGill was born on November 4, 1809, in Philadelphia, Pennsylvania, to James and Lavinia (née Dougherty) McGill, immigrants from County Donegal, Ireland. Following the birth of their sixth child, his parents moved the family to Bardstown, Kentucky, in 1819. At age 11, McGill entered St. Joseph's College, where he studied the classics. In 1824, wanting to go into the priesthood, he went to St. Thomas' Seminary in Bardstown. However, he dropped out after two years to study law under future Kentucky Governor Charles A. Wickliffe in Bardstown

After getting his law license, McGill moved to New Orleans to practice law. Six months later, he returned to Kentucky to work with newly elected U.S. Representative Thomas Chilton. Despite his great financial success as a lawyer, McGill decided to resume his preparation for the priesthood by entering St. Mary's Seminary in Baltimore, Maryland.

=== Priesthood ===
McGill was ordained to the priesthood at St. Joseph's Cathedral in Bardstown, Kentucky, for the Diocese of Bardstown by Bishop John David on June 13, 1835. After his ordination, McGill served as an assistant priest at St. Peter's Parish in Lexington, Kentucky, and at the Assumption Cathedral Parish in Louisville. In 1838, Coadjutor Bishop Guy Ignatius Chabrat sent McGill to Europe to accompany the frail Bishop Benedict Flaget back to Kentucky. This gave McGill a chance to see Rome and recuperate from his own illness.

In 1839, McGill was appointed editor of the Catholic Advocate, which he used to attack Protestantism. He engaged in a written dispute with an Episcopalian minister about the history of the Church of England. McGill also traded opinions with five other Protestant ministers in the local papers. McGill later became an assistant to Ignatius A. Reynolds, then vicar general of the diocese. McGill was named as pastor of St. Louis' Parish in Louisville.

=== Bishop of Richmond ===
On July 23, 1850, Pope Pius IX divided the Diocese of Richmond into two small dioceses, Richmond and Wheeling, and appointed McGill as the third bishop of Richmond. He received his episcopal consecration on November 10, 1850, at St. Joseph's Cathedral from Archbishop Peter Kenrick, with Bishops Richard Miles and Martin Spalding serving as co-consecrators.

When McGill arrived in Richmond in December 1850, the diocese had 7,000 Catholics, eight priests, and 10 churches. He went to Rome in 1854 to be present at the definition of the Immaculate Conception, and convened the first diocesan synod in 1855. During his tenure, Virginia was devastated by yellow fever and cholera epidemics.

During the American Civil War, Catholics in the South were unable to purchase Catholic books published in the North. To fill the gap, McGill wrote, "The True Church Indicated to the Inquirer" and "Our Faith, the Victory", republished as "The Creed of Catholics". He also visited Union Army prisoners of war in the Libby Prison in Richmond, doing what he could to aid them. In 1867, McGill brought the Sisters of Charity from Emmitburgh, Maryland, to set up a school in the diocese. According to his contemporaries, McGill was a very kind person, good with children and supportive of his priests. An accomplished speaker, McGill addressed congregations in Cincinnati, Charleston, Louisville, and Baltimore, as well as in Paris and Rome.

McGill attended the First Vatican Council in Rome from 1869 to 1870, where he supported papal infallibility. While in Rome, he suddenly lost vision in one eye and started experiencing other symptoms. By the time he returned to Richmond, his health had worsened.

=== Death ===
John McGill died of stomach cancer on January 14, 1872, at Richmond, aged 62.

== Works ==
- Our Faith, the Victory: or, A Comprehensive View of the Principal Doctrines of the Christian Religion, Baltimore: Kelly & Piet, 1865.

== Episcopal succession ==
Catholic Church titles
Preceded by Richard Vincent Whelan	Bishop of Richmond; 1850—1872	Succeeded by James Gibbons
