= James Edward Michaels =

American Catholic bishop

His Excellency, The Most Reverend James Edward Michaels S.S.C.M.E.
- Auxiliary Bishop of Wheeling-Charleston; Titular Bishop of Verbe
- Archdiocese: Baltimore
- Diocese: Wheeling-Charleston
- Previous post: Auxiliary Bishop of Kwangju (1966 to 1973)

Orders
- Ordination: December 21, 1951 by William Edward Cousins
- Consecration: April 15, 1966 by Leo Binz

Personal details
- Born: May 30, 1926 Chicago, Illinois, US
- Died: September 21, 2010 (aged 84)
- Motto: In viam pacis (In the way of peace)

Styles of James Edward Michaels
- Reference style: The Most Reverend
- Spoken style: Your Excellency
- Religious style: Bishop

James Edward Michaels S.S.C.M.E. (May 30, 1926 – September 21, 2010) was an American prelate of the Catholic Church who served as an auxiliary bishop of the Diocese of Wheeling-Charleston in West Virginia from 1973 to 1987. He previously served as an auxiliary bishop of the Archdiocese of Kwangju in South Korea from 1966 to 1973. He was a member of the Missionary Society of St. Columban (Columbans).

== Early life ==
James Michaels was born on May 30, 1926, in Chicago, Illinois. He was ordained to the priesthood in Chicago by Archbishop William Edward Cousins on December 21, 1951, for the Columbans.

== Auxiliary Bishop of Kwangju ==
On February 15, 1966, Pope Paul VI named Michaels as an auxiliary bishop of Kwangju and titular bishop of Verbe. He was consecrated on April 15, 1966, by Archbishop Leo Binz of Saint Paul. The principal co-consecrators were Archbishop Harold Henry and Bishop William O'Connor.

== Auxiliary Bishop of Wheeling-Charleston ==
On April 3, 1973, Michaels was appointed auxiliary bishop of Wheeling-Charleston by Paul VI. Michaels resigned as bishop of Wheeling-Charleston on September 22, 1987. He died on September 21, 2010.
