= Evelio Menjivar-Ayala =

Salvadoran American Catholic prelate (born 1970)

His Excellency, The Most Reverend Evelio Menjivar-Ayala
- Bishop of Wheeling-Charleston
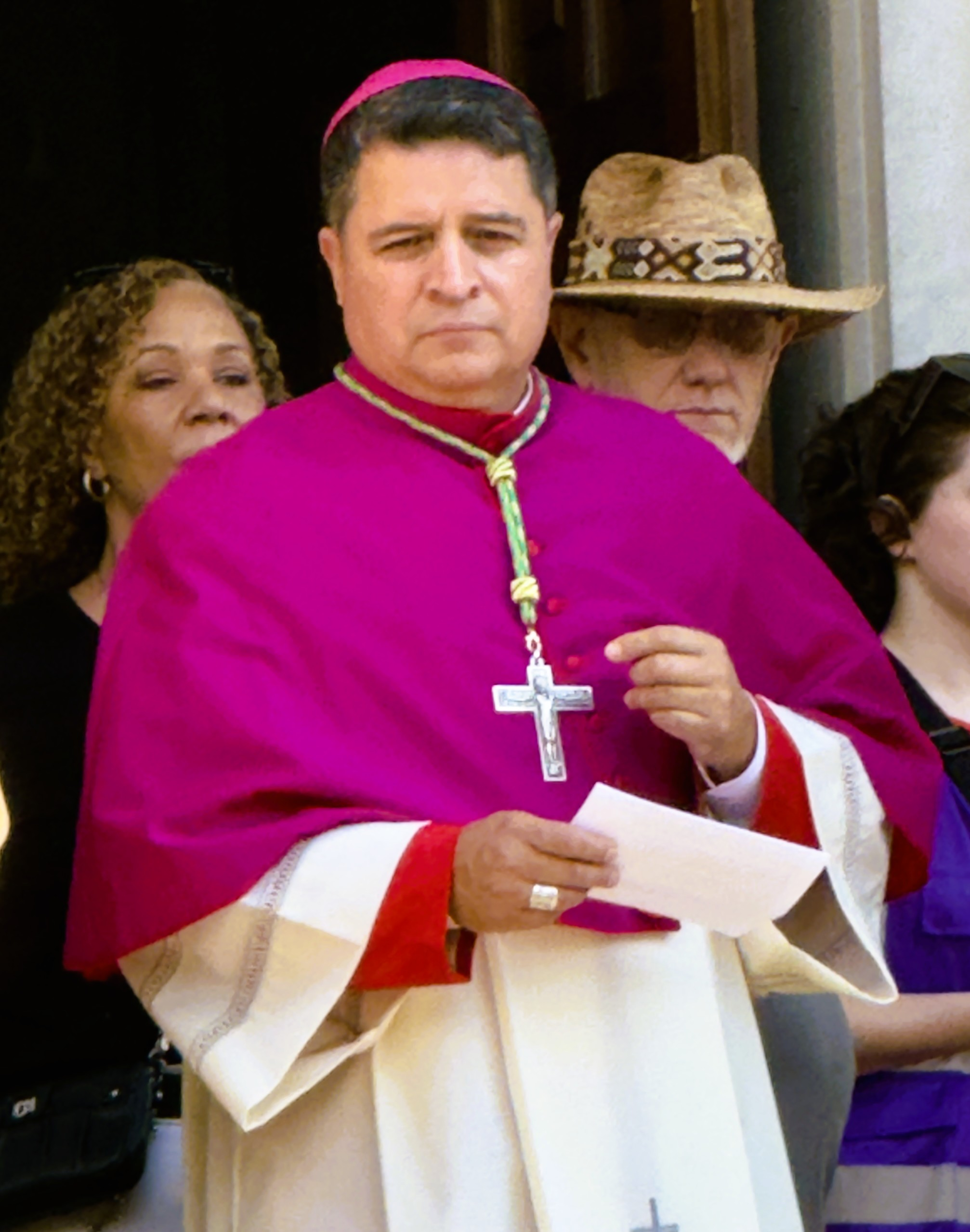
- Menjivar-Ayala in 2025
- Diocese: Wheeling-Charleston
- Appointed: May 1, 2026
- Installed: July 2, 2026
- Predecessor: Mark E. Brennan
- Previous post: Auxiliary Bishop of Washington and Titular Bishop of Aëtus (2023–2026)

Orders
- Ordination: May 29, 2004 by Theodore McCarrick
- Consecration: February 21, 2023 by Wilton Daniel Gregory, Mario E. Dorsonville, and Roy Edward Campbell

Personal details
- Born: August 14, 1970 (age 56) Chalatenango, El Salvador
- Education: St. John Vianney College Seminary; Pontifical University of Saint Thomas Aquinas; Pontifical Urban University
- Motto: Ibat cum illis (Latin for 'He walked with them')
- Styles
- Reference style: His Excellency; The Most Reverend
- Spoken style: Your Excellency
- Religious style: Bishop

Evelio Menjivar-Ayala (born August 14, 1970) is a Salvadorian American Catholic prelate serving as Bishop of Wheeling–Charleston since 2026. When made an auxiliary bishop of the Archdiocese of Washington in 2023, he was the first Salvadoran-born bishop in the country.

== Biography ==
=== Early life ===
Menjivar-Ayala was born on August 14, 1970, in Chalatenango, El Salvador. As a teenager, he made three attempts to enter the United States illegally. Finally, in 1990, he and his brother were smuggled in the trunk of a car over the border crossing between Tijuana and San Diego. Over the next several years, while studying English and earning his GED, he worked janitorial and construction jobs in California and then in Washington, where he arrived in 1990.

Deciding to become a priest, he entered the St. John Vianney College Seminary in Miami, Florida, in 1995, where he earned his bachelor's degree in philosophy in 1999.

Menjivar-Ayala was sent to the Pontifical North American College in Rome in 1999 and received a Master of Theology degree from the Pontifical University of Saint Thomas Aquinas in 2002. He completed further studies at the Scalabrini International Migration Institute (SIMI), part of the Pontifical Urban University in Rome, where he earned a licentiate. Menjivar-Ayala was ordained a deacon in St. Peter's Basilica on October 10, 2002, by Archbishop Timothy M. Dolan.

=== Priesthood ===
On May 29, 2004, Menjivar-Ayala was ordained a priest of the Archdiocese of Washington by Cardinal Theodore McCarrick at the Basilica of the National Shrine of the Immaculate Conception in Washington. He became an American citizen in 2006.

The archdiocese assigned Menjivar-Ayala as parochial vicar for Mother Seton in Germantown, Maryland (2004 to 2008), Saint Bartholomew the Apostle in Bethesda, Maryland (2009), the Cathedral of Saint Matthew the Apostle in Washington (2009 to 2013), and then pastor of Our Lady Queen of the Americas Parish in Washington (2013-2017), and of St. Mary's Church in Landover Hills, Maryland (2017-2022).

== Episcopal career ==
=== Auxiliary Bishop of Washington ===
Coat of arms as auxiliary bishop of Washington

Pope Francis appointed Menjivar-Ayala as an auxiliary bishop of Washington on December 19, 2022. He was consecrated on February 21, 2023, by Cardinal Wilton Gregory at the Cathedral of St. Matthew the Apostle. The co-consecrators were Bishop Mario Dorsonville and Auxiliary Bishop Roy Campbell. He was the first Salvadoran-born bishop in the country. His took his motto, Ibat cum illis ("He walked with them"), from Luke 24:15.

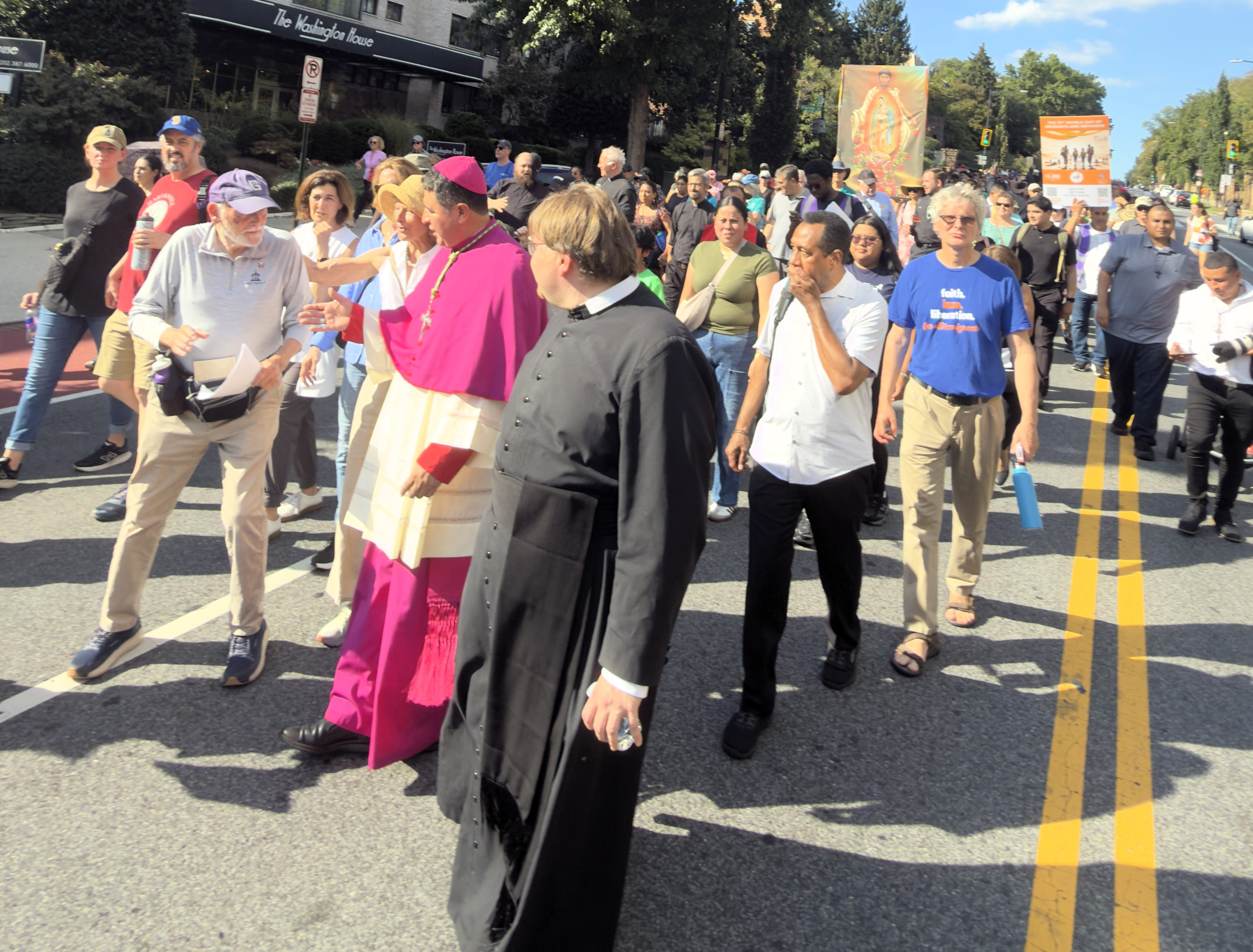
Menjivar-Ayala during the 111th World Day of Migrants and Refugees, 2025

=== Bishop of Wheeling-Charleston ===
On May 1, 2026, Pope Leo XIV appointed Menjivar-Ayala the tenth bishop of Wheeling-Charleston. He was installed on July 2, 2026.

== See also ==
- Catholic Church hierarchy
- Catholic Church in the United States
- Historical list of the Catholic bishops of the United States
- List of Catholic bishops of the United States
- Lists of patriarchs, archbishops, and bishops

== Episcopal succession ==
Catholic Church titles
Preceded by -	Auxiliary Bishop of Washington; 2023–2026	Succeeded by -
Preceded by Mark E. Brennan	Bishop of Wheeling-Charleston; 2026–present	Succeeded by Incumbent
