= Diocese of Wheeling–Charleston =

Latin Catholic jurisdiction in the United States

Coordinates: 40°04′13″N 80°41′55″W

Diocese of Wheeling–Charleston Dioecesis Vhelingensis–Carolopolitana
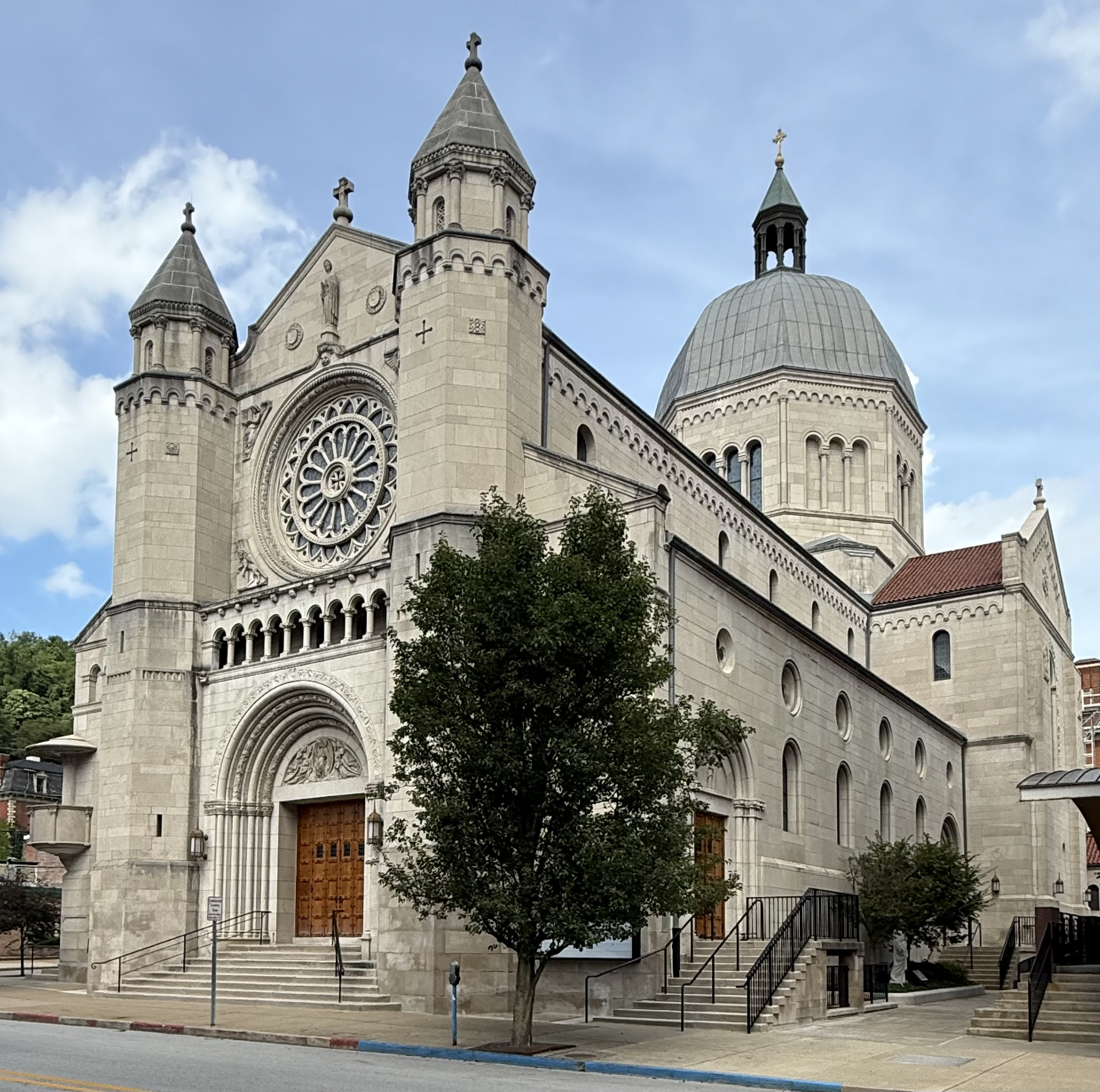
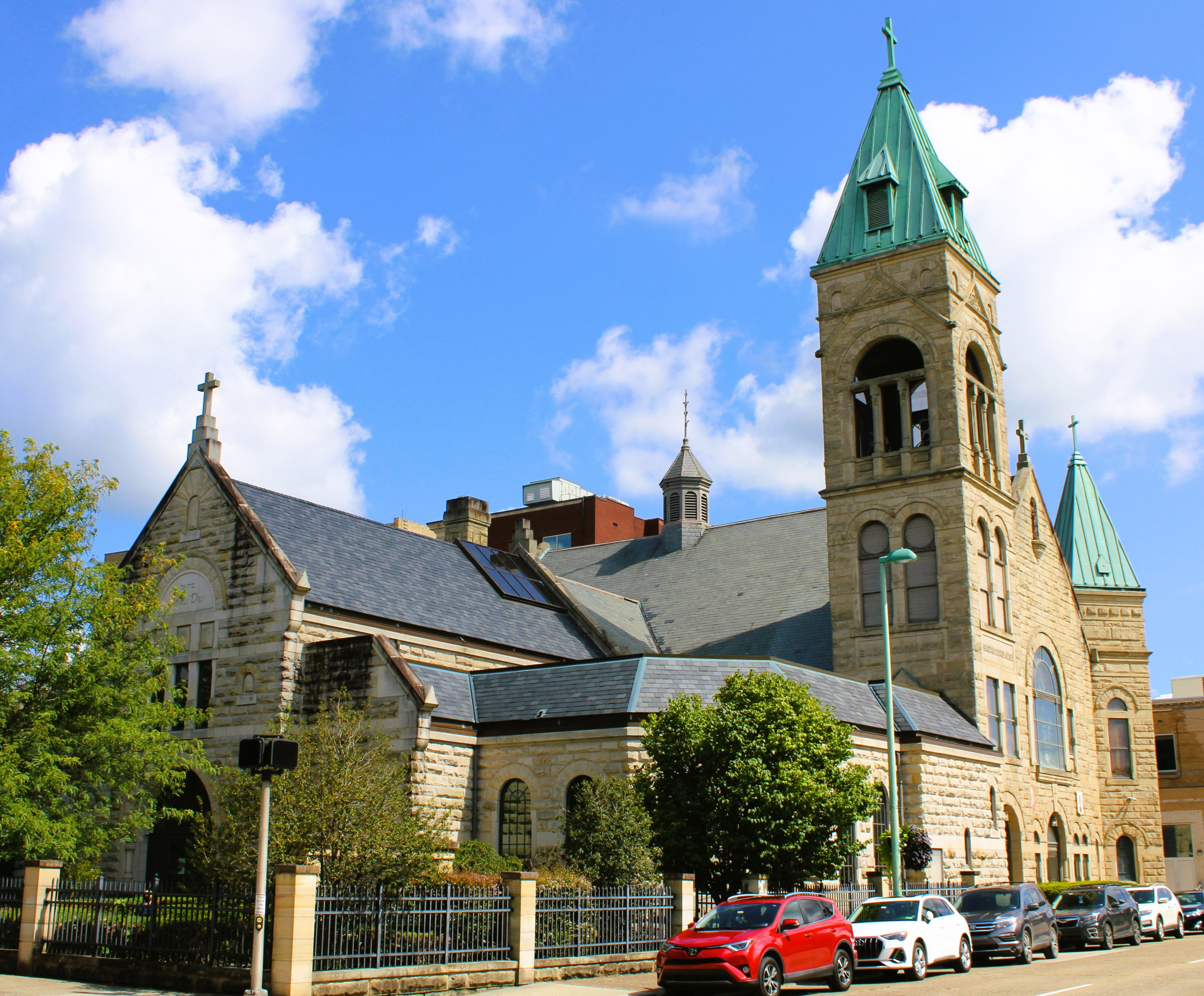
- Cathedral of Saint Joseph Basilica of the Co-Cathedral of the Sacred Heart

- Coat of arms

Location
- Country: United States
- Territory: West Virginia
- Ecclesiastical province: Baltimore

Statistics
- Area: 24,282 sq mi (62,890 km^{2})
- Population: Total; Catholics: (as of 2018); 1,818,470; 109,260 (6%)
- Parishes: 91

Information
- Denomination: Catholic Church
- Sui iuris church: Latin Church
- Rite: Roman Rite
- Established: July 19, 1850 (176 years ago)
- Cathedral: Cathedral of Saint Joseph (Wheeling)
- Co-cathedral: Basilica of the Co-Cathedral of the Sacred Heart (Charleston)

Current leadership
- Pope: Leo XIV
- Bishop: Evelio Menjivar-Ayala
- Metropolitan Archbishop: William E. Lori
- Bishops emeritus: Mark E. Brennan

Map
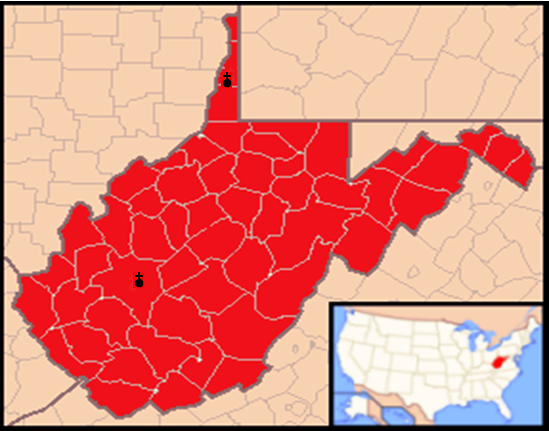

Website
- dwc.org

The Diocese of Wheeling–Charleston (Latin: Dioecesis Vhelingensis–Carolopolitana) is a diocese of the Catholic Church comprising West Virginia in the United States. It is a suffragan diocese of the Archdiocese of Baltimore. Evelio Menjivar-Ayala is the bishop. The diocese maintains two cathedrals: the Cathedral of Saint Joseph in Wheeling and the Basilica of the Co-Cathedral of the Sacred Heart in Charleston.

== History ==
=== 1700 to 1850 ===
Before the American Revolution, few Catholics lived in present-day West Virginia, then part of the British Colony of Virginia. The colonial government in Virginia in the late 1600s had outlawed the practice of Catholicism in the colony.

After the end of the American Revolution in 1783, Pope Pius VI erected the Prefecture Apostolic of the United States in 1784, encompassing the entire United States. Five years later, he converted the prefecture into the Diocese of Baltimore.

With the 1786 passage of Virginia Statute for Religious Freedom, proposed by future US President Thomas Jefferson, Catholics were granted religious freedom in the new state of Virginia. Pope Pius VII erected the Diocese of Richmond in 1820, taking all of Virginia (except for two eastern counties) and present day West Virginia from the Archdiocese of Baltimore. The pope named Patrick Kelly as the first bishop of the new diocese. The first Catholic parish in Wheeling was St. James, a small log cabin church established in 1822 to serve Irish and German immigrants.

During the 1840s, Richard Vincent Whelan was serving as the second bishop of Richmond. He became concerned that his growing diocese was too vast to administer. He therefore requested that the Vatican divide the diocese into two, using the Allegheny Mountains as a natural boundary.

=== 1850 to 1894 ===
Bishop Whelan (pre-1914)

Pope Pius IX on July 19, 1850, erected the Diocese of Wheeling, containing the area of Virginia south of the Pennsylvania state border and west of the Allegheny Mountains. Pius IX appointed Whelan as the first bishop of the new diocese.

During his first year as bishop, Whelan founded Wheeling Hospital, the only medical facility between Pittsburgh, Pennsylvania, and Cincinnati, Ohio. Three years later, a contingent of religious sisters of the Sisters of Saint Joseph arrived from MIssouri to staff it. Today it is WVU Medicine Wheeling Hospital. Whelan in 1856 opened the Children; Home, an orphanage in Wheeling that was also staffed by the Sisters of St. Joseph. Today it is the St. John's Home for Children.

During Whelan's 24-year tenure as bishop, he built 42 churches and opened nine schools. The first church in Charleston, Sacred Heart, was constructed in 1869. By the time of his death in 1874, the Catholic population of the diocese numbered around 18,000.

Pope Leo XIII replaced Whelan with John Kain from Wheeling in 1875. After 18 years, Leo XIII named Kain as coadjutor archbishop of the Archdiocese of St. Louis in 1893 and appointed Patrick Donahue of Baltimore as the new bishop of Wheeling in 1894.

=== 1894 to 1948 ===
Donahue established 38 parishes, six missions, four hospitals, two monasteries, an orphanage and several schools in the diocese. He also established the first official diocesan periodical, The Church Calendar, in 1895 and held the sixth diocesan synod in 1899. The number of priests serving the diocese more than tripled and the number of Catholics increased from 20,000 to 62,000. For all these many achievements, he earned the nickname of the "Great Builder." The Pallottine Missionary Sisters in 1913 opened Sacred Heart Hospital in Richwood, their first hospital in West Virginia. They established a second hospital in 1921, St. Joseph's Hospital in Buckhannon.

In 1922, Pope Pius XI appointed John Swint as an auxiliary bishop of Wheeling. When Donahue died later that year, the pope named Swint as Donahue's replacement. While the diocese had long served the Italian, Irish, and Polish immigrant groups, the major population growth came during Swint's tenure. In 1924, the Pallottines opened St. Mary's Hospital in Huntington in 1924. Today it is St. Mary's Medical Center.

During Swint's 40 years as bishop, the population of the diocese doubled. He oversaw the building of a new cathedral, 100 churches, 52 elementary and high schools.

=== 1948 to 1960 ===
In 1948, Swint threatened to excommunicate any Catholic women from the diocese who participated in the Miss West Virginia competition for the Miss America pageant. He called the pageant "pagan" and stated that if "nakedness" were removed from the pageant, it would "fall to pieces". Two Catholic women withdrew from competition. However, a third Catholic contestant, Mariruth Ford, ignored Swint's ban and participated, winning the competition.

In 1952, Swint condemned the planned opening of a Planned Parenthood clinic in Parkersburg that would provide contraception and other health care services to women. He said it was part of a national plan by doctors to break the Catholic Church's ban on artificial birth control. Swint received the personal title of archbishop from the Vatican in 1954.In 1954, Swint opened Wheeling College, to be run by the Society of Jesus. Today it is Wheeling University.

=== 1960 to 1985 ===
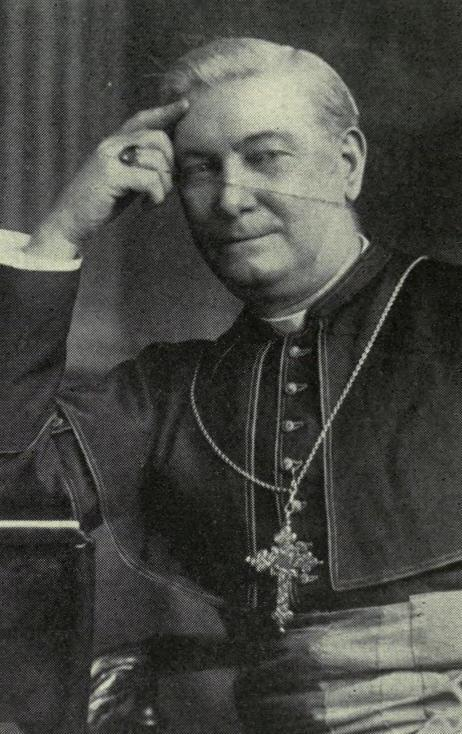
Bishop Kain (1903)

In 1961, Pope John XXIII appointed Auxiliary Bishop Joseph Hodges of Richmond as coadjutor bishop in Wheeling to assist Swint. Swint died the next year and Hodges automatically succeeded him as bishop.

Hodges dedicated much of his administration to implementing the reforms of the Second Vatican Council in the diocese, establishing a liturgical commission, a priests' senate, the Sisters' Council, and the Cursillo movement. A strong supporter of ecumenism, Hodges established a Commission for Religious Unity in 1964, co-founded the Joint Commission of Roman Catholics and Episcopalians in 1978 with the episcopal bishop of West Virginia, and joined the West Virginia Council of Churches in 1981. He mandated parish councils in 1968, introduced extraordinary ministers to the diocese in 1970 and permanent deacons in 1975, and renovated the exterior and interior of St. Joseph's Cathedral in Wheeling in 1973.

When the State of West Virginia was admitted to the Union in 1863 during the American Civil War, the new state line with Virginia did not match the diocesan boundaries. Some West Virginia parishes remained in the Diocese of Richmond while some Virginia parishes went to the Diocese of Wheeling. In May 1974, Pope Paul VI remedied this geographic disparity by transferring the West Virginia parishes to the Diocese of Wheeling and the Virginia parishes to the Diocese of Richmond. Paul VI renamed the Diocese of Wheeling as the Diocese of Wheeling–Charleston in August 1974.He designated the Church of the Sacred Heart in Charleston, West Virginia as the co-cathedral. Hodges died in 1985.

=== 1985 to present ===
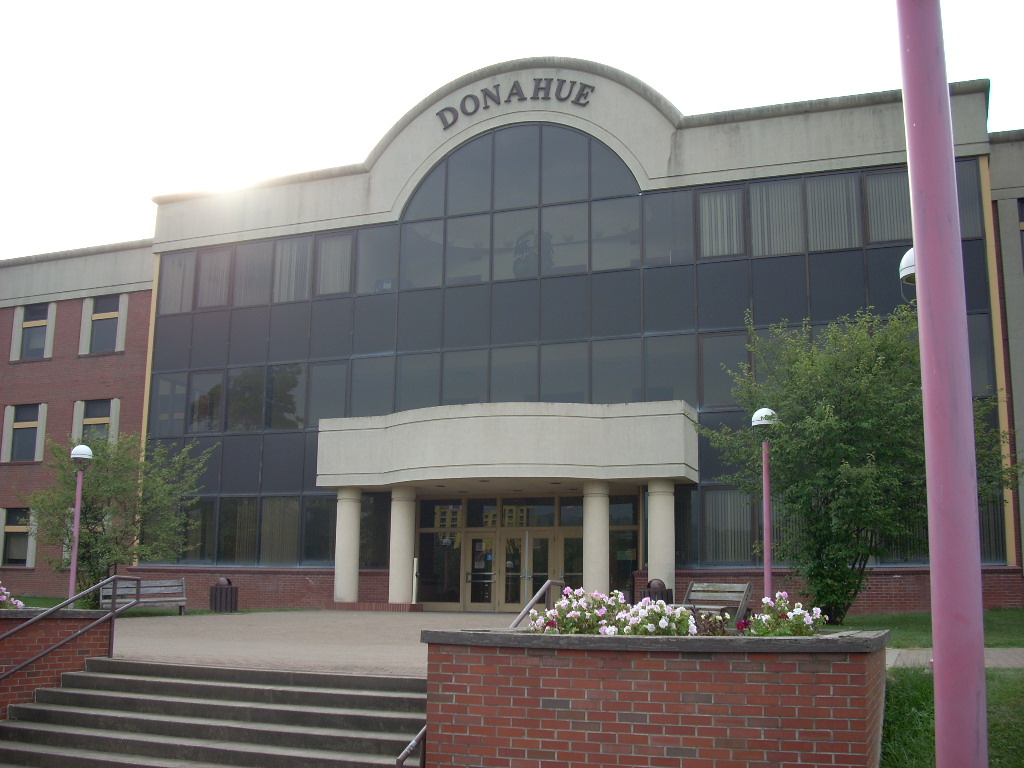
Wheeling University, Wheeling, West Virginia (2007)

Pope John Paul II named Auxiliary Bishop Francis B. Schulte from the Archdiocese of Philadelphia as the new bishop of Wheeling-Charleston in 1985. In 1988, the pope appointed Bernard Schmitt as auxiliary bishop of the diocese. A year later, Schulte was made archbishop of the Archdiocese of New Orleans. Schmitt replaced him in West Virginia. Schmitt resigned in 2004. His successor was Michael J. Bransfield. Pope Benedict XVI raised Sacred Heart to a minor basilica on November 9, 2009.

In 2018, Pope Francis accepted the resignation of Bransfield and appointed Archbishop William E. Lori as apostolic administrator. Francis then instructed Lori to investigate allegations of sexual harassment of adults by Bransfield. In 2019, Auxiliary Bishop Mark E. Brennan from Baltimore became the new bishop.

Brennan in February 2021 reinstated the diocesan advisory council, which had not met since 2006. On May 1, 2026, Pope Leo XIV accepted Brennan's resignation and appointed Evelio Menjivar-Ayala, Auxilary Bishop of Washington, as the tenth bishop of the diocese.

== Tracy portfolio ==
The Diocese of Wheeling-Charleston owns a multi-million dollar investment portfolio that it received as a donation by Sara Tracy in the early 20th century. Born in 1827 in New York City, Tracy had inherited a large estate from her brother, Edward Tracy. While on an ocean voyage to Rome in 1899, she met Bishop Donahue. During the trip, Donahue counseled Tracy on a personal matter. As they disembarked in Europe, Tracy gave him a $5,000 donation for the diocese.

During her lifetime Tracy continued to support the diocese and willed her entire estate to Donahue. The proceeds allowed Donahue to establish Wheeling College in Wheeling, build other facilities across the diocese and found several outreach ministries. The investments brought substantial revenues for the diocese over decades. As of 2020, the Tracy portfolio exceeded $286 million in value. Annual royalty revenues were $13.9 million, with total revenues from investments exceeding $15 million for that year.

== Sexual abuse ==
In November 2018, the diocese released the names of 18 clergy who had been "credibly accused" of sexually abusing minors while serving in the diocese. The list also revealed the names of 13 priests who were transferred to the diocese after being accused of committing sex abuse in other dioceses. Reported incidents of sex abuse on this list date back to 1950. Eleven of the clergy on the list were deceased at the time of its release.

Four lawsuits were filed against the diocese in 2020 regarding Victor Frobas, a priest and teacher at St. Paul's Catholic School in Weirton in the early 1980s. The lawsuit asserted that the diocese was aware of sexual abuse allegations against Frobas from his time in the Archdiocese of Philadelphia as well as in Weirton. In 1988, Frobas pleaded guilty to sexually molesting minors in Kirkwood, Missouri and was sentenced to four years in prison. He died in 1993, soon after being indicted in Massachusetts on sexual abuse charges.

== Bransfield scandal ==
In July 2019, Pope Francis banned Bransfield from public ministry and from residing in the diocese. In August 2019, the diocese settled a sexual abuse lawsuit brought against it and Bransfield. The plaintiff, a former altar server, claimed that Bransfield had sexually assaulted him in 2014.

In September 2019, a former seminarian known as JE sued the diocese and Bransfield. The plaintiff cited several occasions in 2017 and 2018 in which Branfield abused him sexually. In July 2023, JE and the diocese reached a financial settlement to the case.

In November 2019, Bishop Brennan ordered Bransfield to take the following actions:

- Pay more legal settlements to his victims
- Pay the diocese $792,638 in restitution
- Pay the Internal Revenue Service $110,000 in back taxes
- Apologize "for the severe emotional and spiritual harm his actions caused" to his victims and to the diocese.

Also in November 2019, Brennan revoked some of Bransfield's retirement benefits and barred him from being buried in the diocesan cemetery. The directive was believed to be a rare or unprecedented example of a bishop being ordered to pay restitution. The Vatican later agreed to lower Bransfield's required restitution. In August 2020, Bransfield paid the diocese $441,000 and issued an apology. Bransfield died in May 2026.

== Bishops ==
Bishop Donahue (pre-1914)

=== Bishops of Wheeling ===
1. Richard Vincent Whelan (1850–1874)
2. John Joseph Kain (1875–1893), appointed Coadjutor Archbishop of St. Louis and later succeeded to that see
3. Patrick James Donahue (1894–1922)
4. John Joseph Swint (1922–1962), appointed Archbishop ad personam in 1954
5. Joseph Howard Hodges (1962–1974; coadjutor bishop 1961–1962); title changed with title of diocese

=== Bishops of Wheeling–Charleston ===
1. Joseph Howard Hodges (1974–1985)
2. Francis B. Schulte (1985–1989), appointed Archbishop of New Orleans
3. Bernard William Schmitt (1989–2004)
4. Michael Joseph Bransfield (2004–2018)
5. Mark E. Brennan (2019–2026)
6. Evelio Menjivar-Ayala (2026-present)

=== Auxiliary bishops of Wheeling ===
- John Joseph Swint (1922), appointed Bishop of Wheeling
- James Edward Michaels, S.S.C.M.E. (1973–1974); title changed with title of diocese

=== Auxiliary bishops of Wheeling–Charleston ===
- James Edward Michaels, S.S.C.M.E. (1974–1987)
- Bernard William Schmitt (1988–1989), appointed bishop of Wheeling–Charleston

=== Coadjutor bishop ===
Thomas John McDonnell (1951–1961); died before succession

== Vicariates ==
The Diocese of Wheeling-Charleston has seven vicariates.

== Education ==
As of 2026, the Diocese of Wheeling-Charleston had six high schools and 18 elementary schools.

=== Present high schools ===
- Charleston Catholic High School – Charleston
- Madonna High School – Weirton
- Notre Dame High School – Clarksburg
- Parkersburg Catholic High School – Parkersburg
- St. Joseph Central Catholic High School – Huntington
- Wheeling Central Catholic High School – Wheeling

== Universities ==
- Wheeling University – Wheeling
- Catholic International University – online university headquartered in Charleston
