= Richard Vincent Whelan =

American prelate

His Excellency, The Right Reverend Richard Vincent Whelan
- Bishop of Wheeling
- Church: Roman Catholic Church
- See: Diocese of Wheeling
- In office: July 23, 1850 – July 7, 1874
- Predecessor: Patrick Kelly
- Successor: John Joseph Kain
- Previous post: Bishop of Richmond (1841–1850)

Orders
- Ordination: May 1, 1831 by Jean-François-Étienne Borderies
- Consecration: March 21, 1841 by Samuel Eccleston

Personal details
- Born: January 28, 1809 Baltimore, Maryland, USA
- Died: July 7, 1874 (aged 65) Baltimore
- Education: Mount St. Mary's College; Seminary of Saint-Sulpice

Richard Vincent Whelan (January 28, 1809 – July 7, 1874) was an American Catholic prelate who served as bishop of Wheeling in Virginia (later West Virginia) from 1850 to 1874. He previously served as bishop of Richmond in Virginia from 1841 to 1850.

== Biography ==
=== Early life ===
Richard Whelan was born on January 28, 1809, in Baltimore, Maryland. At age ten, he was enrolled at Mount St. Mary's College in Emmitsburg, Maryland where he studied the classics. Following his graduation with the highest honors in 1826, Whelan completed his theological studies at the Seminary of Saint-Sulpice in Paris, France.

=== Priesthood ===
Whelan was ordained to the priesthood for the Diocese of Richmond by Bishop Jean-François-Étienne Borderies in Versailles, France, on May 1, 1831. Returning to Maryland, Whelan became a faculty member and business manager at Mount St. Mary's, and also served as pastor of a parish in Harper's Ferry, then in Virginia. His pastoral responsibilities included missions at Martinsburg, Winchester and Bath, all in Virginia at that time These communities, separated by long distances, contained many families who could not access Catholic institutions of any kind.

=== Bishop of Richmond ===
On December 19, 1840, Whelan was appointed the second bishop of Richmond by Pope Gregory XVI. He received his episcopal consecration in Baltimore at the Cathedral of the Assumption of the Blessed Virgin Mary on March 21, 1841, from Archbishop Samuel Eccleston, with Bishops Benedict Fenwick and John Hughes serving as co-consecrators, at Baltimore.

Since the departure of Bishop Patrick Kelly in 1822, the Diocese of Richmond had been vacant. During that period, Richmond had become a stronghold of the Know-Nothing political party, known for its anti-Catholic bigoty and violence. The diocese only had six priests.

Soon after his arrival in Richmond, Whelan appealed to the Societies for the Propagation of the Faith in Paris, Lyon, France, and Vienna in the Austrian Empire to recruit priests for the diocese. He also established a seminary college outside Richmond, where he resided and taught classes whenever he was in town. Whelan also established several parishes, missions and schools.

=== Bishop of Wheeling ===
In 1848, Whelan petitioned Pope Pius IX to divide the Diocese of Richmond into two dioceses, with the Allegheny Mountains serving as the boundary. The pope erected the new Diocese of Wheeling on the western slope of the Alleghenies on July 19, 1850, and appointed Whelan on July 23, 1850, as its first bishop. Pope Pius named John McGill as the new bishop of Richmond.

The new Diocese of Wheeling had only two or four Catholic churches and two or six Catholic priests. It consisted of several distinct valleys, with many immigrants but limited funds and access to social services. Whelan became known for his resourcefulness, even performing carpentry and stonework himself. He also had to deal with anti-Catholicism or Know-Nothings in the diocese. When a papal nuncio was scheduled to visit in Wheeling in 1853, Whelan was worried about his security. When the nuncio arrived, Whelan ringed the cathedral with supporters to protect him.

In 1861, the State of Virginia seceded from the United States to join the Confederate States of America at the start of the American Civil War. However, public sentiment in the Wheeling area opposed secession. A group established the Restored Government of Virginia in Wheeling and elected lawyer Francis H. Pierpont as its provisional governor. Whelan believed the Restored Government was illegitimate and refused to take a loyalty oath to it. In response, the Wheeling government wanted to arrest him. However, U.S. President Abraham Lincoln refused to allow it. Secretary of War Edwin M. Stanton sent a letter to the Restored Government on May 21, 1862, saying:

"The President being informed that you intend or threaten to arrest Bishop Whelan, the Catholic Bishop of your city, he directs that you take no action against the Bishop without the President's order."

No actions were taken against Whelan during the course of the war. The Diocese of Wheeling became part of the new State of West Virginia in 1863.

Whelan invited several religious congregations to send followers to the diocese to provide needed social services. By the time he died, the diocese had 48 churches, 29 priests, three religious congregations of women, six schools for girls, a school for boys, an orphanage, and a hospital. From 1869 to 1870, Whelan attended the First Vatican Council in Rome, where he opposed papal infallibility because he thought such a declaration would be untimely.

== Death and legacy ==
Whelan fell ill in 1874 and was brought to St. Agnes Hospital in Baltimore for treatment. Richard Whelan died in Baltimore on June 7, 1874, at age 65. A residence hall at Wheeling Jesuit University in Wheeling is named after him.

== Other sources ==
Tricia Pyne, Faith in the Mountains: A History of the Diocese of Wheeling-Charleston (2000)

Catholic Church titles
Preceded by Patrick Kelly	Bishop of Richmond; 1841—1850	Succeeded by John McGill
Preceded by none	Bishop of Wheeling; 1850—1874	Succeeded by John Joseph Kain
