= Michael J. Bransfield =

American Catholic prelate and convicted sex offender (1943–2026)

His Excellency, The Most Reverend Michael J. Bransfield
- Bishop of Wheeling-Charleston
- Province: Baltimore
- Diocese: Wheeling-Charleston
- Appointed: December 9, 2004
- Installed: February 22, 2005
- Retired: September 13, 2018
- Predecessor: Bernard William Schmitt
- Successor: Mark E. Brennan
- Previous post: Rector, Basilica of the National Shrine of the Immaculate Conception (1990–2004)

Orders
- Ordination: May 15, 1971 by John Krol
- Consecration: February 22, 2005 by William Henry Keeler

Personal details
- Born: Michael Joseph Bransfield; September 8, 1943 Philadelphia, Pennsylvania, US
- Died: May 7, 2026 (aged 82) Pennsylvania, US
- Motto: Thy will be done
- Styles
- Reference style: His Excellency; The Most Reverend
- Spoken style: Your Excellency
- Religious style: Bishop

Michael Joseph Bransfield (September 8, 1943 – May 7, 2026) was an American Catholic prelate who served as Bishop of Wheeling-Charleston from 2005 to 2018.

After Bransfield retired in 2018, a church investigation led by Archbishop William E. Lori of Baltimore and five lay experts examined "multiple allegations of sexual harassment of adults and financial improprieties" leveled against him. They found that the accusations of sexual harassment were credible and detailed Bransfield's diversion of diocesan funds to support a lavish lifestyle and drug addictions.

In July 2019, Pope Francis banned Bransfield from residing in the Diocese of Wheeling-Charleston and ordered him not to “preside or to participate anywhere in any public celebration of the Liturgy," thus barring him from engaging in public ministry within the Catholic Church. Church leaders—some of whom had previously received gifts from Bransfield—were criticized for failing to respond to initial complaints concerning Bransfield and for later weakening restitution requirements.

== Biography ==
=== Early life ===
Michael Bransfield was born on September 8, 1943, in Philadelphia, Pennsylvania, and attended Catholic schools in Philadelphia. He earned a Bachelor of Philosophy degree and a Master of Divinity degree from St. Charles Borromeo Seminary in Wynnewood, Pennsylvania.

=== Priesthood ===
Bransfield was ordained to the priesthood at the Cathedral of Saints Peter and Paul in Philadelphia by Cardinal John Krol on May 15, 1971. Bransfield received a Master of Philosophy degree from Catholic University of America in Washington, D.C. He was later a teacher and chaplain at Lansdale Catholic High School in Lansdale, Pennsylvania, and the chairman of its religion department. In 1987, Pope John Paul II named Bransfield as an honorary prelate.

Bransfield was named assistant director and director of liturgy (1980), director of finance (1982), and director (1986) at the National Shrine of the Immaculate Conception in Washington, D.C. When the shrine was named a basilica in 1990, Bransfield was appointed its first rector, serving in this position until 2004.

=== Bishop of Wheeling-Charleston ===
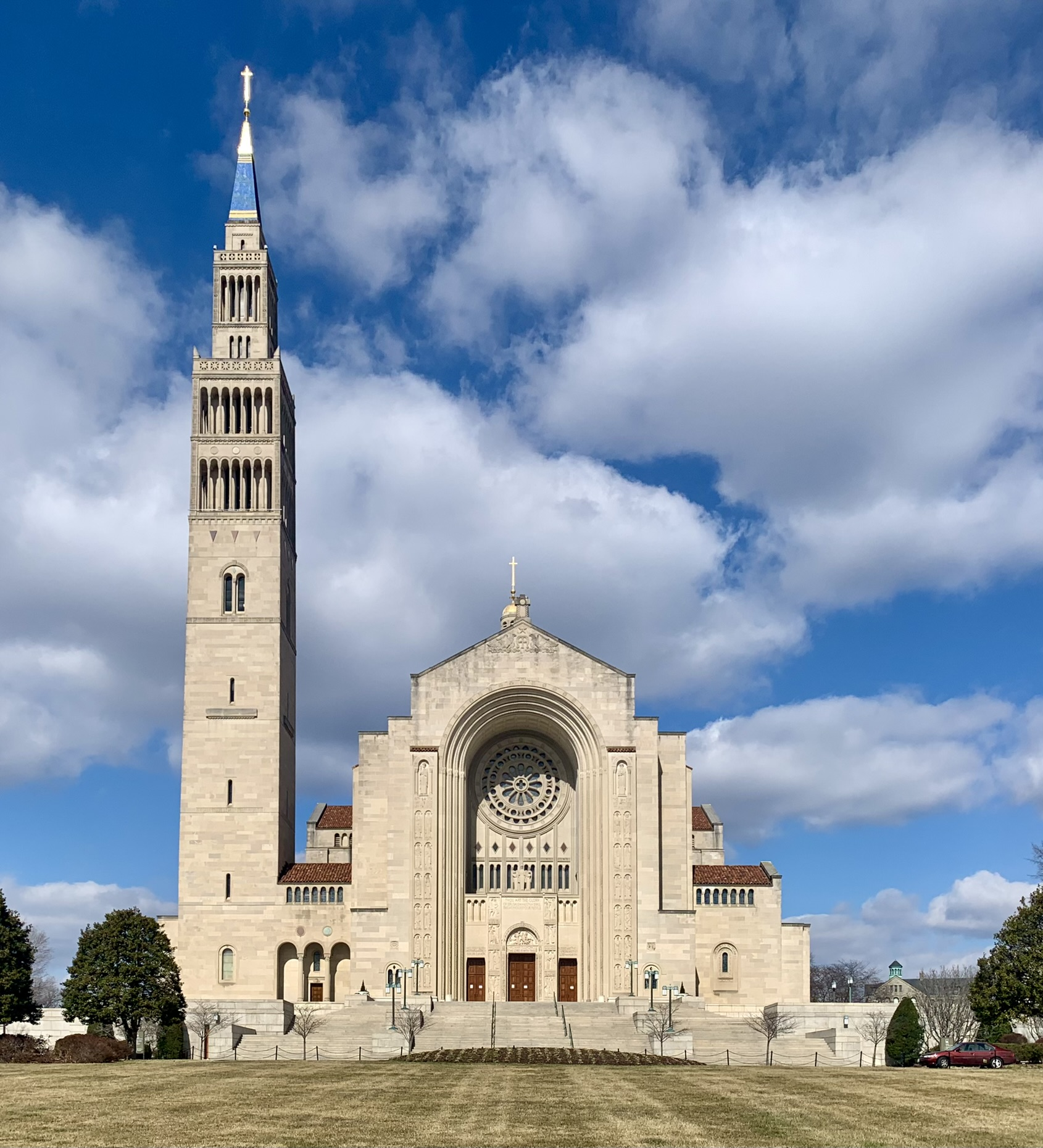
Basilica of the National Shrine of the Immaculate Conception, Washington, D.C. (2022)

On December 9, 2004, John Paul II appointed Bransfield as bishop of Wheeling-Charleston. He was consecrated on February 22, 2005, by Cardinal William Keeler, with Cardinal Theodore McCarrick and Bishop Bernard Schmitt as co-consecrators, at St. Joseph's Cathedral in Wheeling, West Virginia.

As a bishop, Bransfield was elected president of The Papal Foundation, a Catholic nonprofit organization that distributes funds to charitable organizations. Within the United States Conference of Catholic Bishops (USCCB), he served a term as treasurer, and as a member of the Conference's Communications Committee and the National Collections Committee; he also co-authored a set of diocesan financial guidelines approved by the USCCB in 2002.

Bransfield was a member of the boards of trustees of the St. Charles Borromeo Seminary and the Basilica of the National Shrine of the Immaculate Conception.

=== Accusations of sexual abuse and harassment ===
In April 2012, the Associated Press reported that Bransfield had been accused of sexual abuse of a boy in the Archdiocese of Philadelphia. Accusations against Bransfield had been raised in testimony by a witness at the trial of two Philadelphia priests, one charged with attempted rape and the other with failing to report sexual abuse. Bransfield was not charged with a crime and denied ever sexually abusing anyone.

=== Resignation ===
When he turned 75 in September 2018, Bransfield submitted his resignation to the pope as required by canon law. His resignation was immediately accepted by Pope Francis, who named Archbishop William E. Lori of Baltimore as apostolic administrator of the diocese. At the time of Bransfield's resignation, he was described as an associate of McCarrick.

=== Death ===
Bransfield died on May 7, 2026, at the age of 82. His death was announced by the Wheeling-Charleston Diocese in a statement and confirmed that Bransfield would not be buried in West Virginia. Prior to his death, he had been barred from being buried at the diocesan cemetery in West Virginia by Bishop Mark E. Brennan. At the time of his death, he had moved back to his family property near Philadelphia.

== Investigations and aftermath ==
After Bransfield resigned, Pope Francis directed Archbishop Lori to conduct an investigation into allegations that Bransfield sexually harassed adults. The investigation was prompted by an August 2018 letter to Lori from Monsignor Kevin Quirk, a canon lawyer and top aide to Bransfield. In the letter, Quirk alleged that Bransfield had engaged in drug and alcohol abuse, sexual harassment, and financial impropriety.

In 2019, the five lay investigators overseen by Lori submitted a 60-page report on Bransfield to the Vatican. A copy of the Lori report was obtained by The Washington Post, which reported on the findings in June 2019. Lori released a letter to the priests and laity of the diocese about the investigation on the same day as the Post article. The Post published the full Lori report in December 2019.

=== Sexual harassment ===
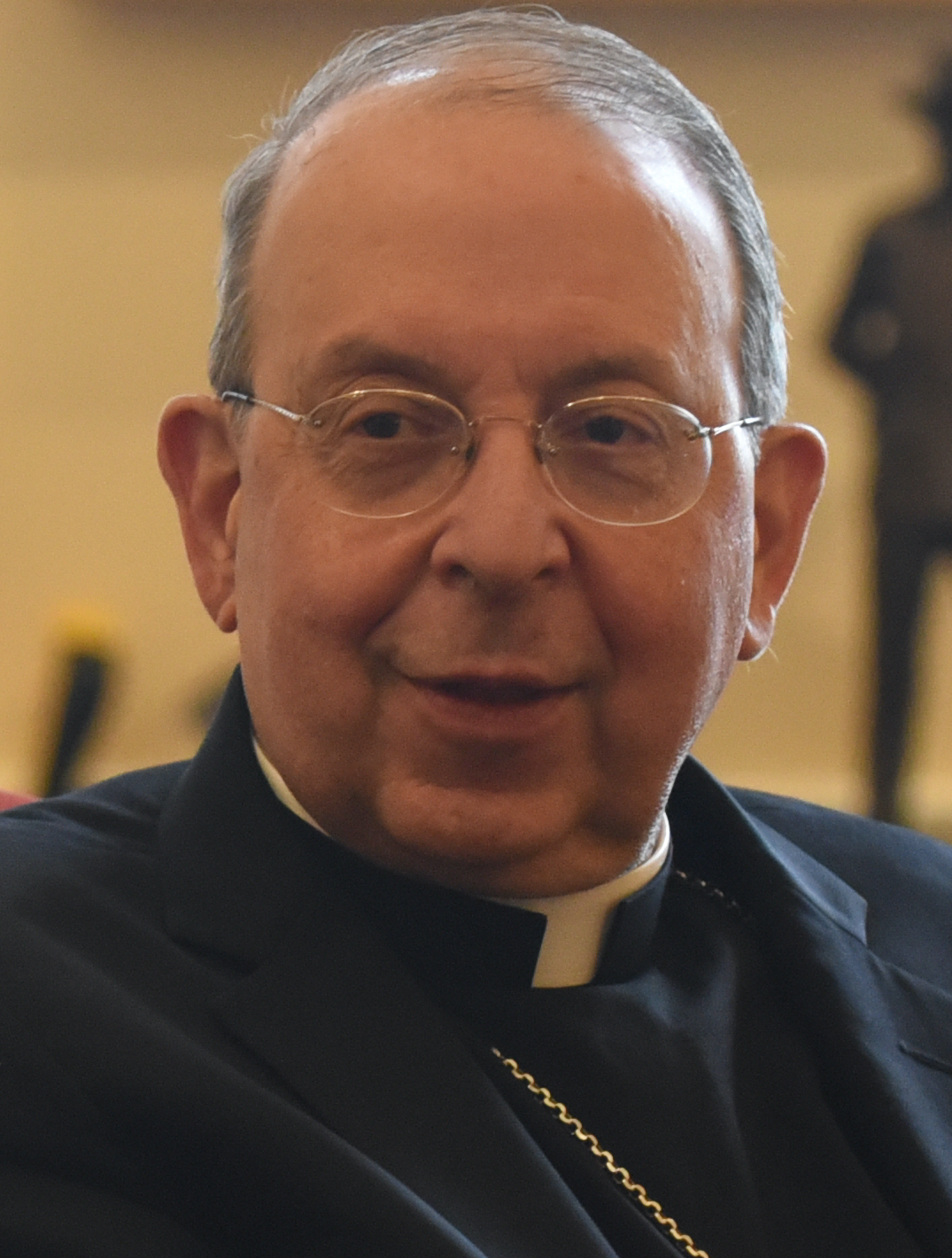
Archbishop Lori (2022)

The Lori investigative team determined that the allegations that Bransfield had sexually harassed adults were "credible". The report stated: "The team uncovered a consistent pattern of sexual innuendo, and overt suggestive comments and actions toward those over whom the former bishop exercised authority," specifically seminarians and young priests. According to a diocesan spokesman, the investigation "found that no criminal activity was undertaken", and the Lori report was not submitted to law enforcement. Lori stated that "the investigation found no conclusive evidence of sexual misconduct with minors by the former bishop during its investigation." The Washington Post reported the opposite conclusion, stating that the report reads:

“We did not find conclusive evidence that Bishop Bransfield committed sexual misconduct with minors; however, there is significant reason for concern that this occurred,” the report stated, citing “several troubling incidents” involving altar servers.

As summarized in the Washington Post, the Lori report gave the accounts of nine men in the diocese who accused Bransfield "of touching or groping them, kissing or exposing himself to them or of commenting on their bodies." The report stated that the diocese's judicial vicar had attempted to ensure that altar servers were not left alone with Bransfield. The report did not name the complainants; Lori said that information was withheld "due to privacy concerns and at the request of those who alleged harassment by Bishop Bransfield."

The Lori report also stated that;

- Sexual abuse complaints were raised against Bransfield when he was a teacher at Lansdale High School and rector of the Basilica
- The vicar for clergy in the diocese reported that at least six clerical assistants to Bransfield "were broken by" their experiences working under him;
- As bishop, Bransfield abused alcohol and prescription drugs, including oxycodone, and this "likely contributed to his harassing and abusive behavior."

In an interview with investigators, Bransfield denied engaging in any sexual misconduct.

=== Financial impropriety ===
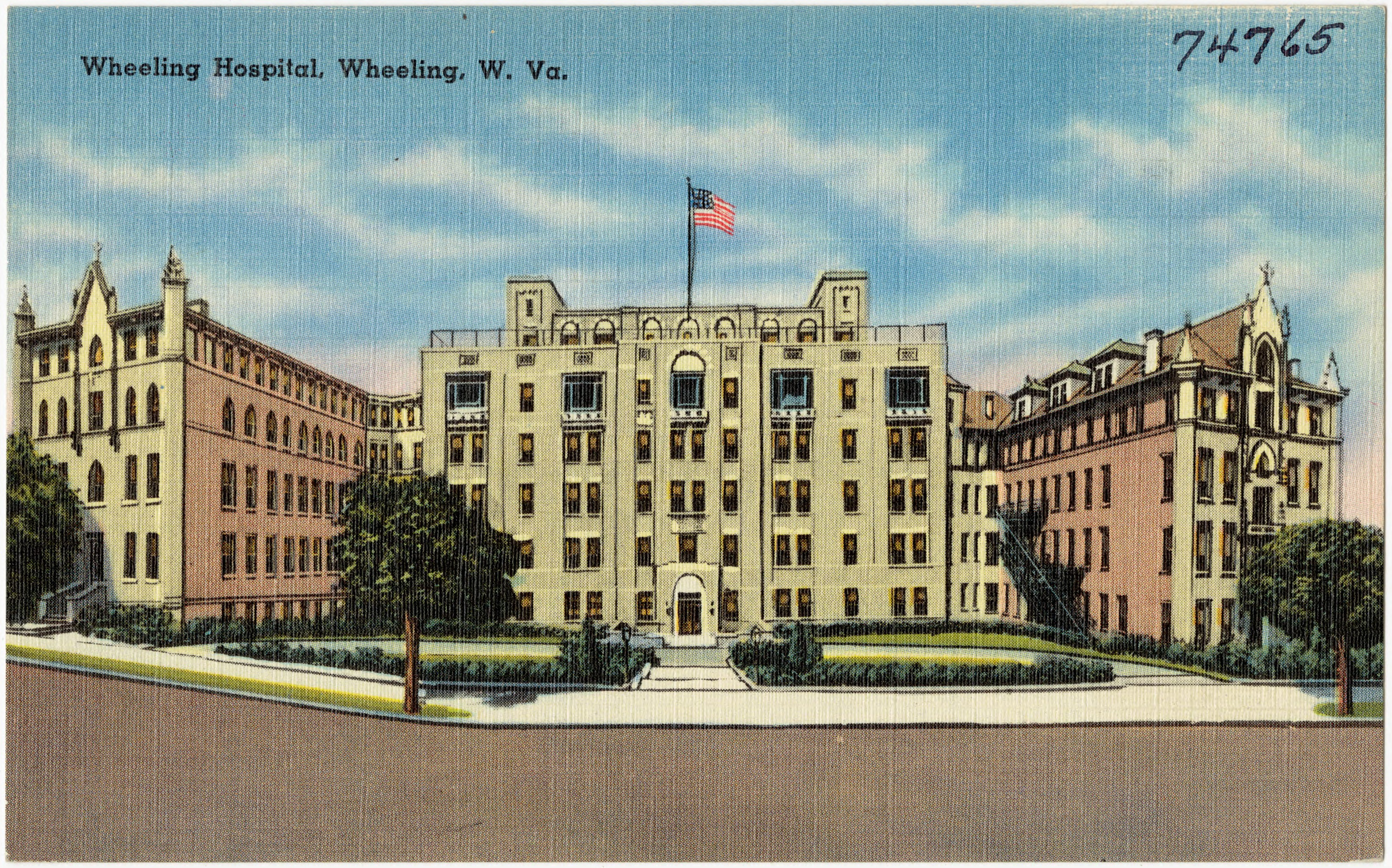
Wheeling Hospital, Wheeling, West Virginia (1950)

The Lori investigation also found that over ten years, Bransfield gave a total of $350,000 in cash gifts to other Catholic clerics, "including young priests he is accused of mistreating and more than a dozen cardinals in the United States and at the Vatican." Bransfield wrote the checks from his personal account, and the diocese reimbursed him for the value of the gifts. The gifts came in the form of at least 565 checks made out to the clerics by name. The Lori report also found that Bransfield, along with several subordinates, spent:

- Approximately $1,000 per month on alcohol
- $182,000 for fresh flowers delivered daily to the chancery
- $4.6 million to renovate Bransfield's church residence after a fire damaged a single bathroom
- Church funds for a personal chef and chauffeur
- $2.4 million for corporate jet, limo services, and hotel stays.

The Lori report found that the diocese's financial board was "extremely passive" and lacked adequate financial controls, with "an almost complete absence of any meaningful review of financial decisions." (Note: The diocese was organized as a corporation sole, giving Bransfield extremely broad authority to use diocesan funds without effective oversight. Bransfield could, for example, both initiate and approve payments to himself.) The investigators concluded that "Bishop Bransfield adopted an extravagant and lavish lifestyle that was in stark contrast to the faithful he served and was for his own personal benefit."

Bransfield denied the findings of the Lori report, but provided no details to corroborate his denial. In a July 2019 interview, he argued that his financial decisions as bishop were justified and approved by diocesan financial officials.

One of Bransfield's other changes was that, as head of the board of the Wheeling Hospital, he appointed consultants who improved the financial standing of the hospital, a long-time money-loser, but at the cost of allegedly improperly billing Medicare and Medicaid. Once the hospital was making money, he moved much of its revenue into a charity controlled personally by him, which sent some of the gifts to other prelates and officials described above. The hospital's apparent windfall was short-lived, as a Justice Department lawsuit eventually required the hospital to pay back $50 million in a settlement.

==== Early warnings of financial impropriety ====
Beginning in 2012, multiple parishioners in Bransfield's diocese complained to church authorities in the United States and the Vatican that Bransfield was engaged in financial abuses, but these complaints were not acted upon. Archbishop Lori, Archbishop Carlo Viganò, then the papal nuncio to the United States; Cardinal Raymond Burke, then the leader of the Apostolic Signatura at the Vatican; and Archbishop Peter Wells, an official at the Vatican Secretariat of State, all received these complaints. Viganò, Burke, Wells, and Lori were also recipients of cash gifts from Bransfield.

Between 2005 and 2018, Bransfield had paid $350,000 to clergy in the United States and in the Vatican in what an aide described as an effort to "purchase influence". In July 2019, after the Washington Post reported on the early warnings, "Wells, Burke and Lori said the gifts did not influence how they responded to parishioners' complaints," while "Viganò said he did not recall receiving complaints and did not give Bransfield favorable treatment" and said that he had donated the funds to charity shortly after the gift was made.

=== Recommendations of the investigative team ===
The Lori report "recommended Bransfield be stripped of powers as bishop, removed from ministry and forced to pay restitution" and also recommended that Bransfield's three top aides be removed from office.

=== Church disciplinary action ===
In March 2019, following the delivery of the investigators' report, Lori removed Bransfield from "any priestly or episcopal ministry either within the Diocese of Wheeling-Charleston or within the Archdiocese of Baltimore" pending review of the report by the Holy See. In June 2019, Bransfield's three former top aides resigned.

In July 2019, Pope Francis banned Bransfield from living in the Diocese of Wheeling-Charleston and forbade him from presiding over or participating "in any public celebration of the Liturgy." Though Bransfield was not laicized, these measures permanently excluded him from engaging in any form of public ministry in the Catholic church.

Pope Francis also directed that Bransfield's replacement as bishop determine how Bransfield should "make personal amends" for his actions. Baltimore Auxiliary Bishop Mark E. Brennan was appointed Bishop of Wheeling-Charleston in late July 2019, and installed in August 2019.

=== Restitution ===
In November 2019, Brennan ordered Bransfield to pay restitution of $792,638 to the diocese and to issue an apology "for the severe emotional and spiritual harm his actions caused" to his victims and to the diocese. Brennan also directed Bransfield to pay $110,000 in unpaid taxes to the US Internal Revenue Service. Brennan also revoked some of Bransfield's retirement benefits and barred him from burial in the diocesan cemetery. Brennan's directive is believed to be a rare, perhaps unprecedented, example of a bishop being ordered to pay restitution.

In early August 2020, Brennan indicated that Bransfield was not responding to him and had failed to apologize or respond to the restitution directive of November 2019. Later in August 2020, the Vatican approved a reduced restitution package; Bransfield wrote a letter of apology that took no direct responsibility (apologizing for "any scandal or wonderment caused by words or actions attributed to me during my tenure as Bishop") and agreed to pay $441,000 in restitution to the diocese. However, Bransfield continued to maintain, "I believed that such reimbursements to me were proper." Under the Vatican agreement, Bransfield was to receive a monthly stipend from the Diocese of Wheeling-Charleston and have the diocese pay his health insurance coverage. Bransfield also retained his title as bishop. Many West Virginia parishioners were critical of Bransfield's lack of remorse and his apology letter saying he believed he did nothing wrong.

The diocese said it would reimburse the costs of mental health assistance for "known victims" of Bransfield. Lori, as apostolic administrator, also directed the creation of a "third-party reporting system" for allegations against bishops of the diocese.

The Survivors Network of those Abused by Priests (SNAP) called for a law enforcement investigation and criticized the church discipline imposed against Bransfield by Brennan as insufficient because they suggested "that Bransfield alone should make reparations." SNAP called for consequences for Church officials who concealed, or failed to address, Bransfield's conduct.

=== Civil lawsuits ===
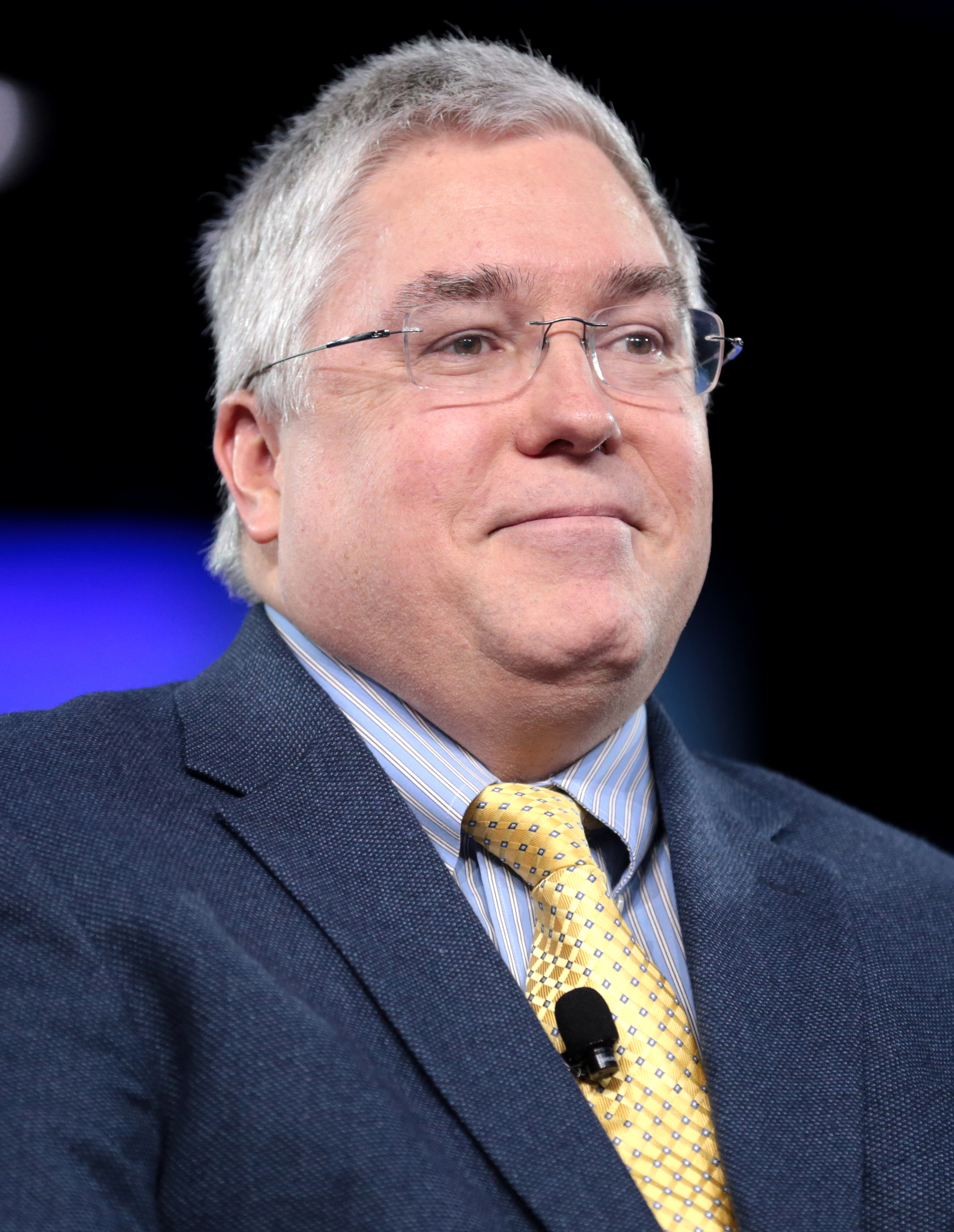
West Virginia Attorney General Patrick Morrisey (2017)

In March 2019, a former personal altar boy for Bransfield sued the Diocese of Wheeling-Charleston, alleging that Bransfield had sexually harassed him for years and sexually assaulted him in 2014. The suit was settled on confidential terms in August 2019.

Also in March 2019, West Virginia Attorney General Patrick Morrisey filed a civil lawsuit on behalf of the State of West Virginia against the Diocese of Wheeling-Charleston and Bransfield, alleging violations of West Virginia consumer protection laws. The complaint specifically alleges that the diocese advertised itself as a safe place for children while "knowingly employed pedophiles and failed to conduct adequate background checks" on workers in Catholic schools and camps. The lawsuit was groundbreaking because it named a diocese as a defendant rather than individual priests, and because it sought to make use of consumer-protection law to obtain discovery of church records.

In September 2019, a second sex-abuse lawsuit was filed in state court in Ohio County, West Virginia, against Bransfield by a former seminarian who accused Bransfield of sexual harassment. As of August 2020, one of the two sex abuse lawsuits filed against Bransfield was still ongoing, while the other was settled out of court.

=== Criminal investigation ===
In October 2019, the Washington Post reported that police were investigating an allegation that Bransfield molested a 9-year-old girl during a September 2012 pilgrimage to the Basilica of the National Shrine of the Immaculate Conception. The Diocese of Wheeling-Charleston was subpoenaed for documents in connection with the investigation. Bransfield denied the allegation.

On August 15, 2021, Bransfield issued a statement apologizing for his actions. Bishop Brennan in September 2021 made this comment about the apology: "For my part, I found his apology self-serving and lacking in any recognition of, or contrition for, actually having offended people."

== Notes ==
Catholic Church titles
Preceded by Bernard William Schmitt	Bishop of Wheeling-Charleston; 2004–2018	Succeeded by Mark E. Brennan
Preceded by none	Rector of the Basilica of the National Shrine of the Immaculate Conception; 1990–2004	Succeeded by Walter R. Rossi
