= Cathedral of Saint Peter (Kansas City, Kansas) =

Cathedral of St. Peter
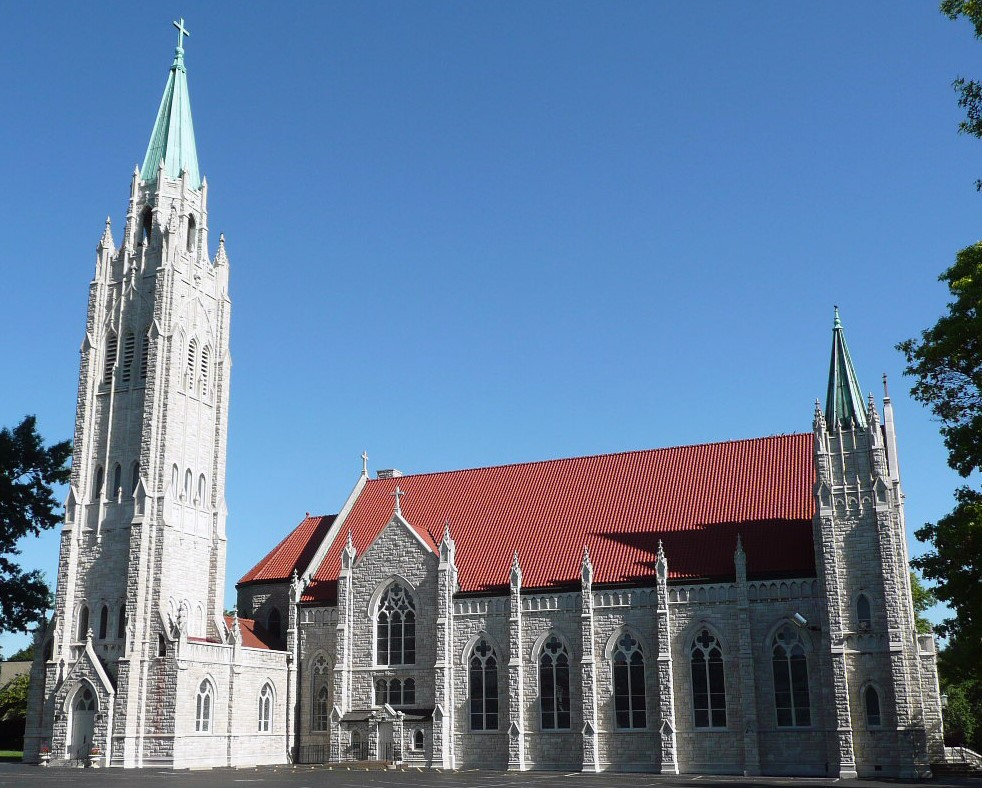
- Cathedral viewed from the south

- Location in Kansas Cathedral of St. Peter (the United States)
- 39°06′37″N 94°38′42″W
- Location: 409 N. 15th St. Kansas City, Kansas
- Country: United States
- Denomination: Roman Catholic
- Website: www.cathedralkck.org

History
- Status: Cathedral/Parish
- Founded: 1907
- Dedication: St. Peter the Apostle
- Dedicated: September 5, 1927
- Consecrated: 1948 (as a cathedral)

Architecture
- Style: Gothic Revival
- Groundbreaking: 1925
- Completed: 1927

Specifications
- Height: 145 feet (44 m)
- Materials: Carthage stone

Administration
- Diocese: Kansas City in Kansas

Clergy
- Archbishop: Most Rev. William Shawn McKnight
- Rector: Very Rev. Anthony J. Saiki, J.C.L.

The Cathedral of Saint Peter is a Roman Catholic cathedral in Kansas City, Kansas, United States and is the seat of the Roman Catholic Archdiocese of Kansas City in Kansas.

== History ==
At the turn of the 20th century, Kansas City, Kansas, was part of the Diocese of Leavenworth. In October 1907, Bishop Thomas Lillis appointed Reverend Bernard Kelly to found St. Peter's Parish in downtown Kansas City. Kelly celebrated the first mass for the parish at the bishop's residence on Sandusky Avenue in December 1907. Kelly immediately started fund raising for a parish church and school. He was able to lay the cornerstone for the facilities on March 14, 1908. St. Peter Church was dedicated on September 7, 1908. The St. Peter School opened with 95 elementary students and ten high school students.

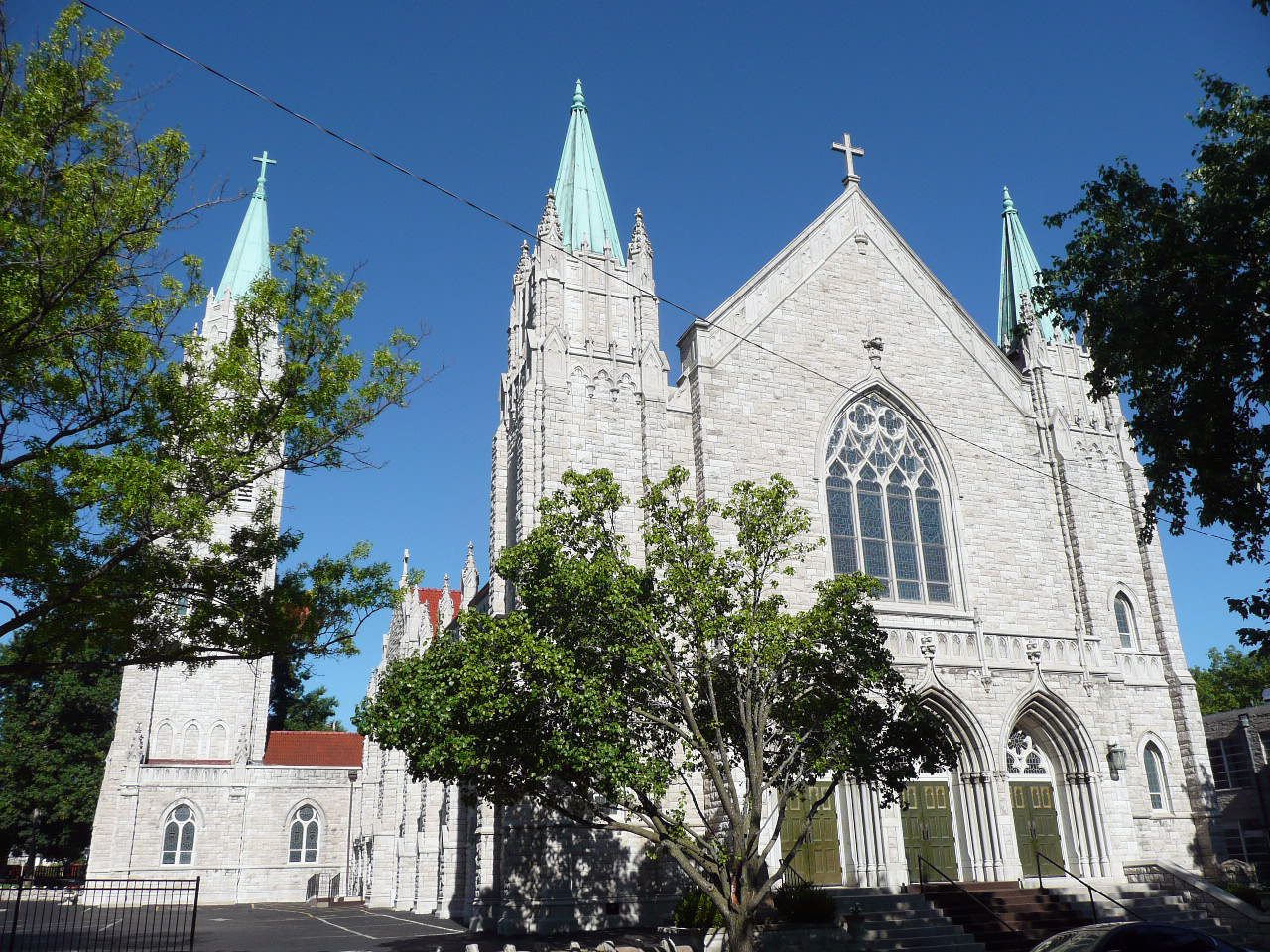
East facade, Cathedral of Saint Peter (2015)

The parish constructed a rectory in 1917. Due to the rapid growth of the parish, construction began on a new church building in 1925. The first mass was celebrated in the new St. Peter Church on August 1, 1927, and it was dedicated on September 5, 1927. By 1937, the school enrollment had risen to 350.

On May 10, 1947, Pope Pius XII suppressed the Diocese of Leavenworth and erected the Diocese of Kansas City in its place. Bishop George Donnelly consecrated St. Peter's as a cathedral in 1948. Twelve gold crosses that represent the twelve apostles were placed between the Stations of the Cross. A portable cathedral was placed in the sanctuary. That same year, a fire destroyed the St. Peter School. This event prompted the parish to build a new, safer school.

Pius XII in August 1952 elevated the Diocese of Kansas City to the Archdiocese of Kansas City. In 1955, the parish opened its new school building A parish center was built in 1992, and the interior of the cathedral was renovated in 1998. In 2006 there were only 110 students enrolled at St. Peter's School. The archdiocese consolidated the parochial schools in eastern Wyandotte County into Resurrection Catholic School in 2007 using the St. Peter's School building.

In 2007, the cathedral parish observed its centennial. A statue of St. Joseph the Worker was placed in the Centennial Courtyard and a time capsule, to be opened in 2057, was buried in the cathedral campus.

== Pastors and rectors ==
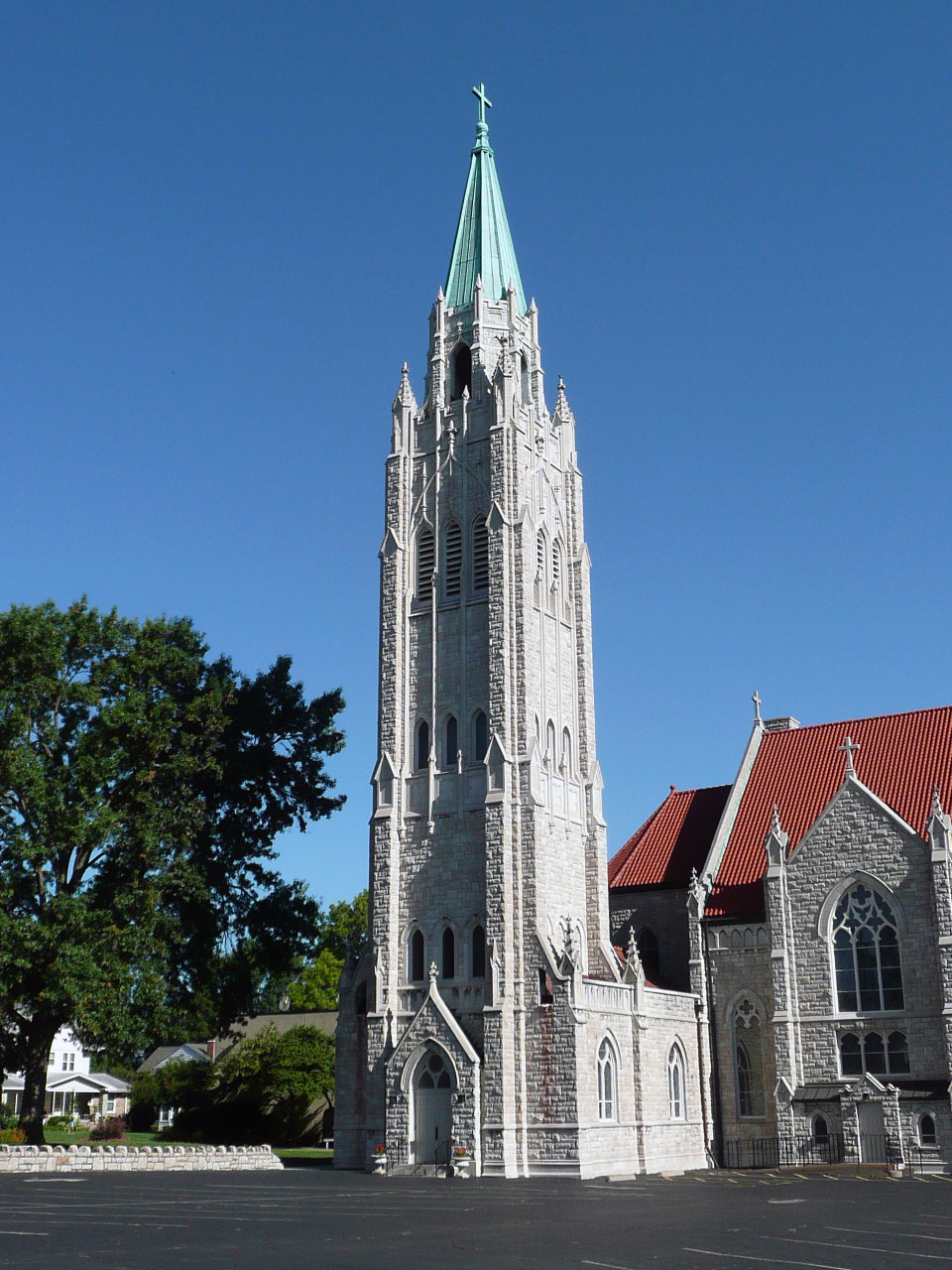
Tower on the southwest corner of the cathedral.

The following priests have served St. Peter's as its pastor. Since 1947 they have also served as rector of the cathedral:

- Reverend Bernard S. Kelly, 1907 – 1909
- Reverend Bernard Mohan, 1909
- Monsignor Patrick McInerney, 1909 – 1911
- Monsignor Francis M. Orr, 1911 – 1937
- Monsignor James P. McKenna, 1938 – 1966
- Very Reverend Leo T. Lutz, 1966 – 1967
- Monsignor J. Kenneth Spurlock, 1967 – 1983
- Very Reverend Thomas Tank, 1983 – 1986
- Monsignor Henry Gardner, 1986 – 1991
- Monsignor William Curtin, 1991 – 1996
- Monsignor Thomas Tank, 1996 – 2003
- Monsignor Gary Applegate, 2003 – 2005
- Monsignor Robert Bergman, 2005 – 2009
- Very Reverend Harold Schneider, 2009 – 2019
- Very Reverend Oswaldo Sandoval, 2019 – 2020
- Very Reverend Anthony J. Saiki, 2020 – present

== See also ==
- List of Catholic cathedrals in the United States
- List of cathedrals in the United States
