= Joseph Fred Naumann =

American Catholic prelate (born 1949)

His Excellency, The Most Reverend Joseph Fred Naumann
- Archbishop Emeritus of Kansas City in Kansas
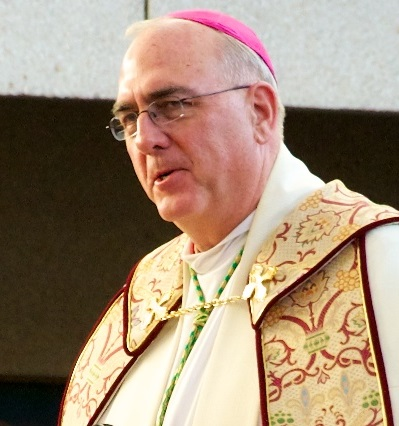
- Church: Catholic Church
- Archdiocese: Kansas City in Kansas
- Appointed: January 7, 2004
- Installed: January 15, 2005
- Retired: April 8, 2025
- Predecessor: James Patrick Keleher
- Successor: W. Shawn McKnight
- Previous posts: Coadjutor Bishop of Kansas City in Kansas (2004‍–‍2005); Auxiliary Bishop of St. Louis and Titular Bishop of Caput Cilla (1997‍–‍2004)

Orders
- Ordination: May 24, 1975 by John Joseph Carberry
- Consecration: September 3, 1997 by Justin F. Rigali, Edward Joseph O'Donnell, and Edward Braxton

Personal details
- Born: June 4, 1949 (age 77) St. Louis, Missouri, US
- Education: Cardinal Glennon College Seminary; Kenrick Seminary
- Motto: Vitae victoria erit (Latin for 'Life will be victorious')

Styles of Joseph Fred Naumann
- Reference style: His Excellency; The Most Reverend
- Spoken style: Your Excellency
- Religious style: Archbishop

Ordination history of Joseph Fred Naumann
History
Diaconal ordination
- Ordained by: Charles Roman Koester
Priestly ordination
- Ordained by: John Joseph Carberry
Episcopal consecration
- Principal consecrator: Justin F. Rigali
- Co-consecrators: Edward Kenneth Braxton, Edward Joseph O'Donnell
Episcopal succession
Bishops consecrated by Joseph Fred Naumann as principal consecrator
- Michael O. Jackels: 2005
- John B. Brungardt: 2011
- Edward J. Weisenburger: 2012
- Carl A. Kemme: 2014

Joseph Fred Naumann (born June 4, 1949) is an American Catholic prelate who served as Archbishop of Kansas City in Kansas from 2004 to 2025. He previously served as an auxiliary bishop for the Archdiocese of St. Louis in Missouri from 1997 to 2004.

== Biography ==
=== Early life ===
Joseph Naumann was born on June 4, 1949, in St. Louis, Missouri, to Fred and Louise (née Lukens) Naumann. He himself never knew his father, who was murdered before he was born.

He graduated from St. Louis Preparatory Seminary South in St. Louis in 1967 and from Cardinal Glennon College in St. Louis in 1971. He then served as a deacon at a parish in Florissant, Missouri, and completed his theological studies at Kenrick Seminary in Shrewsbury, Missouri.

=== Priesthood ===
Naumann was ordained to the priesthood on May 24, 1975, for the Archdiocese of St. Louis by Cardinal John Carberry. After his ordination, he was assigned as an associate pastor of St. Dominic Savio Parish in Affton, Missouri. Naumann was transferred in 1979 to become associate pastor of Our Lady of Sorrows Parish in St. Louis.

In 1984, Naumann was placed as a part-time curate at Most Blessed Sacrament Parish in St. Louis, while working as coordinator of the pro-life committee for the archdiocese. Naumann was sent in 1989 to Ascension Parish in Normandy, Missouri, remaining there for the next five years. He was named vicar general of the archdiocese in 1994.

=== Auxiliary Bishop of St. Louis ===
He received his episcopal consecration on September 3, 1997, from Archbishop Justin Rigali, with Bishops Edward O'Donnell and Edward Braxton serving as co-consecrators. As auxiliary bishop of the Archdiocese of St. Louis and titular bishop of Caput Cilla, Naumann continued to work as vicar general. He was named as apostolic administrator of the archdiocese in October 2003.

=== Archbishop of Kansas City in Kansas ===
John Paul II named Naumann as the coadjutor archbishop of the Archdiocese of Kansas City, Kansas, on January 7, 2004, serving under Archbishop James Keleher. When Keleher resigned as archbishop on January 15, 2005, Naumann succeeded him.

Naumann sits on the committees on Pro-Life and on Communications within the United States Conference of Catholic Bishops (USCCB) as well as the Kenrick-Glennon Seminary Board of Trustees and the board of regents for Conception Seminary. He is also chair of the Kansas Catholic Conference.

On April 21, 2015, Naumann was also appointed apostolic administrator for the Diocese of Kansas City–Saint Joseph. He served in this role until November 4, 2015, when James Johnston Jr. was installed as bishop there. Naumann was elected chairman of the USCCB Committee on Pro-Life Activities on November 14, 2017, defeating by a narrow margin Cardinal Blase Cupich.

After sexual abuse allegations were made against Bishop John Brungardt of the Diocese of Dodge City in February 2021, the Congregation for the Doctrine of the Faith in Rome directed Naumann to open a canonical preliminary investigation into them. In March 2022, Naumann announced that the investigation had exonerated Brungardt.

=== Retirement ===
On April 8, 2025, Pope Francis accepted Archbishop Naumann's resignation as archbishop. On December 17, 2025, he moved into his new home built on the ground of the monastery of the Little Brothers of the Lamb in Kansas City.

== Viewpoints ==
=== Abortion ===
Naumann interprets Canon 915 in the 1983 Code of Law as directing priests to deny communion to Catholic politicians who support abortion rights and euthanasia. He stated that he tried to persuade Kathleen Sebelius, then Governor of Kansas, to change her stand on abortion. After she refused to do so, he denied her communion. Naumann's archdiocese later spent $2.45 million in support of a proposed amendment to the Kansas constitution to protect the unborn, which was defeated by a 59 to 41% margin.

=== Murder of his Father and the Death Penalty ===
Naumann's father, Fred, was murdered in December of 1948 by an employee he had just fired. The employee slashed Naumann's throat, and he died before reaching the hospital.

His mother was three months pregnant with the future archbishop.

In a 2020 video for the Catholic Mobilizing Network in response to the Department of Justice and the Federal Bureau of Prisons resuming executions after 20 years, Naumann said: “The suffering and the circumstances of each family who has lost a loved one by a violent crime are unique. I do not presume to be able to speak for all victims of murder. Yet, I did witness how my mother struggled to provide for our family without the benefit of my father, and the pain that she suffered as a result of losing the love of her life. I also know what it is like for children to grow up without a father. In advocating for the abolition of the death penalty and pleading for the federal government not to continue with the resumption of capital punishment, it is not my intention to minimize the pain and loss of individuals and families who have suffered the death of a loved one as a result of a violent crime."

He has also testified in front of the Kansas legislature against the death penalty.

After his retirement as Archbishop, Naumann shared his testimony in the National Catholic Register. Just three months later, he would write another testimony in the Register in the aftermath of Charlie Kirk's assasaination.

=== Political Involvements ===
On October 22nd, 2026 Naumann was one of 12 Catholic bishops that met and prayed with President Donald Trump. The meeting brought controversies due to the timing of the 2026 midterm elections and Catholic churches official "pro-life" stance on condemnation of sexual predators and abusers. Though many of the Catholic bishops in attendance have made statements about the prayer being used to exploit them for political gain and that they regret attended, Naumann has not made any follow up statements.

Catholic Church titles
Preceded by James Patrick Keleher	Archbishop of Kansas City; 2005–2025	Succeeded by William Shawn McKnight
Preceded by —	Auxiliary Bishop of St. Louis; 1997–2004	Succeeded by —
