= Paul Clarence Schulte =

Roman Catholic archbishop in the United States

The Most Reverend Paul Clarence Schulte
- Archbishop of Indianapolis
- Church: Roman Catholic
- Archdiocese: Indianapolis
- Elected: July 20, 1946
- Predecessor: Joseph Ritter
- Successor: George Biskup

Orders
- Ordination: July 11, 1915 by Samuel Stritch
- Consecration: September 21, 1937 by John J. Glennon

Personal details
- Born: March 18, 1890 Fredericktown, Missouri
- Died: February 17, 1984 (aged 93) Indianapolis, Indiana
- Education: St. Francis Solanus College Kenrick Seminary

Styles of Paul Schulte
- Reference style: The Right Reverend
- Spoken style: Your Excellency
- Religious style: Bishop
- Posthumous style: none

Paul Clarence Schulte (March 18, 1890 – February 17, 1984) was an American prelate of the Roman Catholic Church. He served as archbishop of the Archdiocese of Indianapolis in Indiana from 1946 to 1970. He previously served as bishop of the Diocese of Leavenworth in Kansas from 1937 to 1946.

== Biography ==
=== Early life ===
Paul Schulte was born on March 18, 1890, in Fredericktown, Missouri, to Frederick and Anna (née Priggel) Schulte. After graduating from St. Francis Solanus College in Quincy, Illinois in 1912, he returned to Missouri and studied at Kenrick Seminary in St. Louis. He was ordained to the priesthood on June 11, 1915.

=== Bishop of Leavenworth ===
On May 29, 1937, Schulte was appointed Bishop of Leavenworth by Pope Pius XI. He received his episcopal consecration on the following September 21 from Archbishop John Glennon, with Bishops Christopher Byrne and Christian Winkelmann serving as co-consecrators, at the Cathedral of St. Louis.

=== Archbishop of Indianapolis ===
Schulte was appointed as the second archbishop of the Archdiocese of Indianapolis on July 20, 1946. Archbishop Amleto Giovanni Cicognani, the apostolic delegate to the United States, installed him on October 10, 1946. Schulte's tenure saw the Catholic population of Indianapolis rise from 44,000 to 92,000 over a twenty-year period. He also concentrated on building churches in new suburban areas of cities and expanding educational opportunities. When Fr. Raymond Bosler, former editor of the Indiana Catholic and Record, wrote a scathing article about Cardinal Pedro Segura's attitude toward Protestants entitled "The Cardinal Called the Cops 400 Years Too Late," Schulte responded by saying, "I thought your headline was a little flippant".

Schulte was appointed an assistant at the pontifical throne on February 3, 1961, and attended the Second Vatican Council from 1962 to 1965.

=== Retirement ===
After twenty-three years of service, he resigned his post as Archbishop on January 3, 1970, the same date on which he was made Titular Archbishop of Elicroca.

Schulte died at the St. Augustine Home for the Aged in Indianapolis, at age 93. He was buried at the Calvary Chapel Mausoleum on February 22, 1984.

St. Patrick's Parish in Terre Haute, Indiana, operated a small high school for a number of years. However, many people across Terre Haute began petitioning Archbishop Paul Schulte for a new high school. On January 9, 1952, Archbishop Schulte approved the new school to be named Paul C. Schulte High School; ground was broken on Nov. 16, 1952, for the new co-educational Catholic high school that would serve all the parishes of the city.

The school was placed under the patronage of The Immaculate Heart of Mary, and opened Sept. 14, 1953 with 256 students. Rev. Joseph Beechem was the principal; the faculty consisted of six nuns and five secular teachers, in addition, an assistant pastor from each of the Terre Haute parishes taught religion.

The school began to experience financial problems in the 1971–1972 school year. In response, parish assessments and student tuition were raised. However, by February of the 1975–76 school year, conditions were such that the Terre Haute Deanery Board voted to close the school.

The student body organized a fund-raising drive that made it possible to continue for one more year. In May 1977, the Board decided that the school would have to close at the end of that summer.

By 2010, portions of the school building were being razed as the building had reached the end of its useful life.

Catholic Church titles
Preceded by Francis Johannes	Bishop of Leavenworth; 1937–1946	Succeeded by George Joseph Donnelly
Preceded by Joseph Elmer Ritter	Archbishop of Indianapolis; 1946–1970	Succeeded by George Joseph Biskup
