= Ronald Michael Gilmore =

American prelate

His Excellency, The Most Reverend Ronald Michael Gilmore
- Bishop Emeritus of Dodge City
- Archdiocese: Kansas City in Kansas
- Diocese: Dodge City
- Appointed: May 12, 1998
- Installed: July 16, 1998
- Retired: December 15, 2010
- Predecessor: Stanley Girard Schlarman
- Successor: John Balthasar Brungardt

Orders
- Ordination: July 7, 1969 by David Monas Maloney
- Consecration: July 16, 1998 by James Patrick Keleher, Eugene John Gerber, and Stanley Girard Schlarman

Personal details
- Born: April 23, 1942 (age 84) Pittsburg, Kansas
- Motto: Be still and know

Styles of Ronald Michael Gilmore
- Reference style: His Excellency; The Most Reverend
- Spoken style: Your Excellency
- Religious style: Bishop

Ronald Michael Gilmore (born April 23, 1942) is an American prelate of the Roman Catholic Church. He served as the fifth bishop of the Diocese of Dodge City in Kansas from 1998 to 2010.

== Biography ==
=== Early life and education ===
Ronald Gilmore was born on April 23, 1942, in Pittsburg, Kansas, to Leo and Maxine (née McColm) Gilmore. He attended St. Mary's High School (now St. Mary's Colgan) in Pittsburg, Kansas, from 1956 to 1959, and graduated in 1960 from St. John Vianney High School in Elkhorn, Nebraska.

From 1960 to 1962, Gilmore studied at Immaculate Conception Seminary in Conception, Missouri. He participated in the Catholic Social Service in Wichita, Kansas, in the Cuban Refugee Program until 1963, working with 20 Cuban boys at what was then called Mariana House. Gilmore also attended the University of Ottawa in Ottawa, Ontario (1963–1969), obtaining a Bachelor of Philosophy degree and degrees in theology.

=== Priesthood ===
Gilmore was ordained to the priesthood for the Diocese of Wichita at the Cathedral of the Immaculate Conception in Wichita by Bishop David Maloney on June 7, 1969. After his ordination, Gilmore served as an associate pastor at Blessed Sacrament Parish in Wichita. From 1971 to 1973, he pursued his doctoral studies in theology in Canada.

Upon his return to Kansas in 1973, Gilmore was assigned to the Passionist Monastery in St. Paul. Kansas. He did pastoral work at Magdalen Parish in Wichita (1973–1975) and at St. Teresa Parish in Hutchinson, Kansas (1975–1981). Gilmore also served as assistant chancellor for the diocese.

Gilmore served as a chaplain and religious teacher at Trinity Catholic High School in Hutchinson and chair of the executive committee for the Holy Family Center for the developmentally disabled. In 1981, Gilmore became the administrator of St. Agnes Parish in Castleton, Kansas. In 1982, he became was the first pastor of St. Elizabeth Ann Seton Parish in Wichita. He was named chancellor in August 1983, and vicar general and moderator of the curia in June 1988. In May 1998, the Vatican raised Gilmore to the rank of monsignor.

In 1995, Gilmore handled a claim from the three Alberts brothers, who all claimed to have been sexually abused in 1957 by Reverend William Wheeler. In a written response, Gilmore told the men that there was no proof that Wheeler was a sexual predator and that the burden of proof was on them. Gilmore offered them free psychological evaluations. The Alberts brothers sued the diocese in 1996, but the case was dismissed in court because the statute of limitations had expired.In February 2021, Wheeler, now deceased, was investigated by the Kansas Bureau of Investigation and the diocese added his name to the list of diocese priests with credible accusations of sexual abuse of minors.

=== Bishop of Dodge City ===
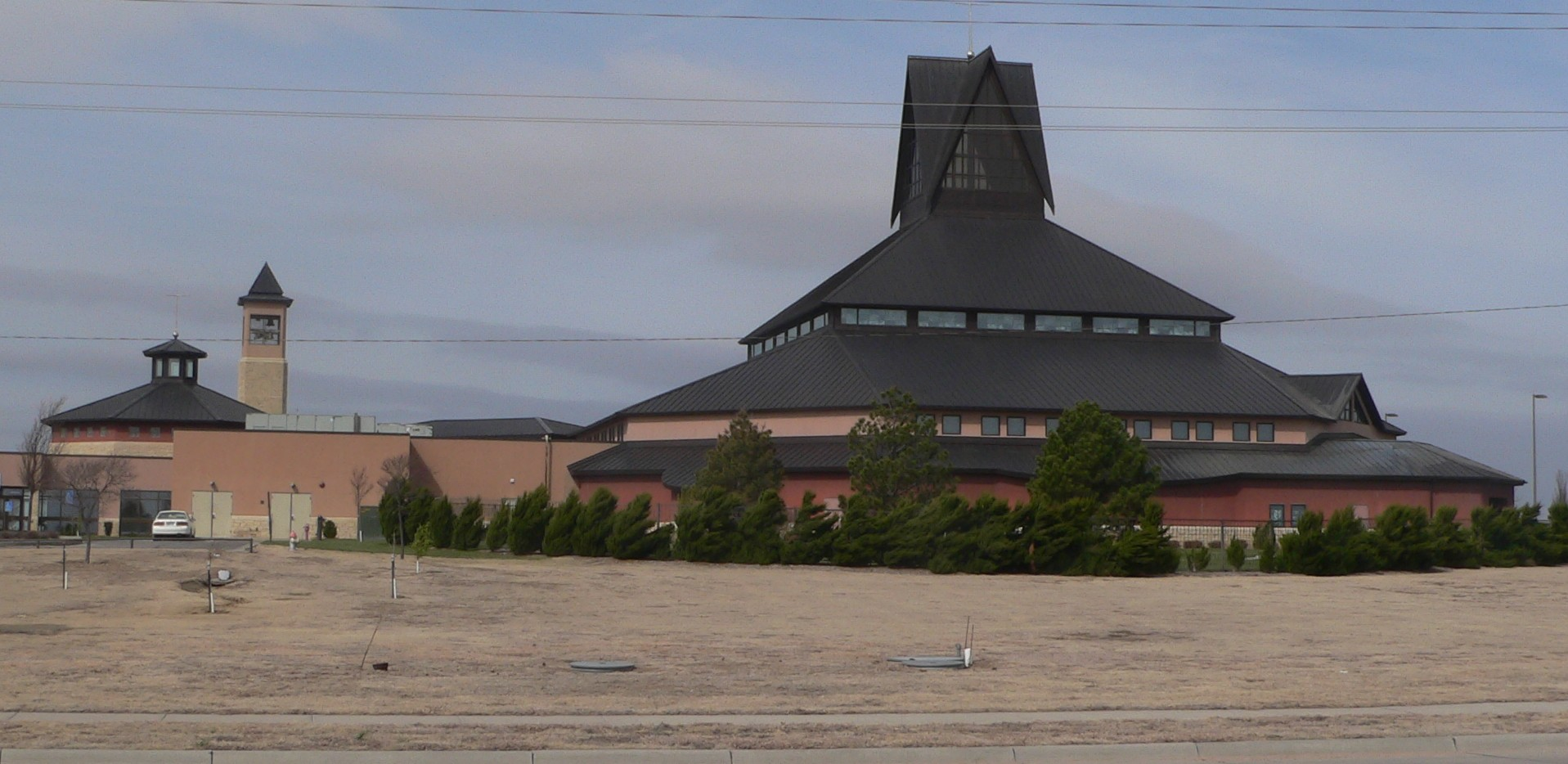
Our Lady of Guadalupe Cathedral, Dodge City, Kansas (2016)

On May 12, 1998, Pope John Paul II appointed Gilmore as the fifth bishop of the Diocese of Dodge City. He was consecrated at St. Dominic Catholic Church in Garden City on July 16, 1998, by Archbishop James Keleher, with Bishops Eugene Gerber and Stanley Schlarman serving as co-consecrators. Gilmour selected as his episcopal motto: "Be Still and Know" Psalms 46:10.

In 2001, the new Cathedral of Our Lady of Guadalupe in Dodge City was dedicated. Within the United States Conference of Catholic Bishops, Gilmore sat on the Stewardship Committee.

=== Retirement ===
On December 15, 2010, Pope Benedict XVI accepted Gilmore's letter of resignation as bishop of Dodge City. Gilmore had requested early retirement at age 68 from the pope because he felt the position had become a burden.

== See also ==
- Catholic Church hierarchy
- Catholic Church in the United States
- Historical list of the Catholic bishops of the United States
- List of Catholic bishops of the United States
- Lists of patriarchs, archbishops, and bishops

== Episcopal succession ==
Catholic Church titles
Preceded by Stanley Girard Schlarman	Bishop of Dodge City; 1998–2010	Succeeded by John Balthasar Brungardt
