= John Balthasar Brungardt =

Catholic bishop

His Excellency, The Most Reverend John Balthasar Brungardt
- Bishop of Dodge City
- Church: Catholic Church
- Archdiocese: Kansas City in Kansas
- Diocese: Dodge City
- Appointed: December 15, 2010
- Installed: February 2, 2011
- Predecessor: Ronald Gilmore

Orders
- Ordination: May 23, 1998 by Eugene John Gerber
- Consecration: February 2, 2011 by Joseph Fred Naumann, Michael Owen Jackels, and Ronald Michael Gilmore

Personal details
- Born: July 10, 1958 (age 68) Salina, Kansas, US
- Education: Benedictine College; Iowa State University; Kansas State University; Pontifical College Josephinum
- Motto: Filled with compassion

Styles of John Balthasar Brungardt
- Reference style: His Excellency; The Most Reverend
- Spoken style: Your Excellency
- Religious style: Bishop

John Balthasar Brungardt (born July 10, 1958) is an American Catholic prelate who has served as Bishop of Dodge City in Kansas since 2010.

== Biography ==
=== Early life and education ===
John Brungardt was born on July 10, 1958, in Salina, Kansas, to Francis Balthasar and Virginia (née Burton) Brungardt, one of six brothers and sisters in a Catholic family He chose Saint Joseph as his confirmation saint, considering him a role model for Catholic men and boys. Brungardt graduated from Benedictine College in Atchison, Kansas, with a Bachelor of Science degree in physics with a minor in mathematics in 1980.

Brungardt furthered his studies at Iowa State University in Ames, Iowa, earning a Master of Science degree in physics in 1983. He then attended Kansas State University in Manhattan, Kansas, earning a Doctor of Philosophy degree in curriculum and instruction. In 1985, Brungardt started his "first career" as a science and computers teacher, teaching at Wichita Collegiate School and then at Kapaun Mt. Carmel High School, both in Wichita, Kansas.

After the death of Brungardt's mother in 1990, he decided to enter the priesthood. He enrolled in 1993 at the Pontifical College Josephinum in Columbus, Ohio. Brungardt earned a Master of Divinity degree and a Master of Arts degree in Moral Theology from the Josephinum in 1998.

=== Ordination and ministry ===
Brungardt was ordained a priest for the Diocese of Wichita by Bishop Eugene Gerber at the Cathedral of the Immaculate Conception in Wichita on May 23, 1998. After his 1998 ordination, the diocese assigned Brungardt as chaplain and religion teacher at Bishop Carroll Catholic High School in Wichita. He was named director of the diocesan office of Respect Life and Social Justice from 1999, a position he would hold until 2004.

In 2001, Brungardt was also appointed as pastor of Sacred Heart Church Parish in Arkansas City, Kansas. In 2003, Brungardt spent five months in Mexico, studying Spanish language and Mexican culture. In 2005, Bishop Michael Jackels appointed Brungardt as chancellor of the diocese and moderator of the Office of Hispanic Ministry.

=== Bishop of Dodge City ===
In November 2010, Pope Benedict XVI appointed Brungardt as the sixth bishop of Dodge City, replacing Bishop Ronald Gilmore. On February 2, 2011, Brungardt was consecrated by Archbishop Joseph Naumann, at the Cathedral of Our Lady of Guadalupe in Dodge City, with Jackels and Gilmore acting as co-consecrators.

Brungardt chose his episcopal motto, "Filled With Compassion", from the story of the Prodigal Son in the Gospel of Luke. The left side of his coat of arms is the shield of the diocese. The right side is divided into two halves. The superior side features a sun. The lower half features a rose.

On February 9, 2021, the Kansas Bureau of Investigation (KBI) notified Brungardt that he was under investigation for sexual abuse of a minor. Denying the accusations, he immediately suspended his episcopal duties and the Vatican instructed Archbishop Joseph Naumann to start a canonical investigation. Bishop Gerald Vincke was appointed as apostolic administrator to run the diocese during the investigation. The Congregation for the Doctrine of the Faith cleared Brungardt of all accusations on March 23, 2022. The KBI did not file any criminal charges against Brungardt.

== See also ==
- Catholic Church hierarchy
- Catholic Church in the United States
- Historical list of the Catholic bishops of the United States
- List of Catholic bishops of the United States
- Lists of patriarchs, archbishops, and bishops

== Episcopal succession ==
Catholic Church titles
Preceded by Ronald Gilmore	Bishop of Dodge City; 2010–present	Incumbent
