= John Ward (bishop of Leavenworth) =

American prelate

John Chamberlain Ward (May 25, 1857 – April 20, 1929) was an American prelate of the Roman Catholic Church. He served as Bishop of Leavenworth from 1911 until his death in 1929.

== Biography ==
The second of three children, John Ward was born in Cuyahoga County, Ohio to Joseph and Ellen (née McGrath) Ward, who were both natives of County Westmeath, Ireland, and came to the United States in the 1850s.

He attended the parochial school in Olmsted and high school in Berea. He continued his classical studies at St. Mary's College in Cincinnati and at Assumption College in Ontario, Canada. Returning to the United States, he studied philosophy and theology at St. Meinrad's Seminary in Spencer County, Indiana.

Ward was ordained to the priesthood by Bishop Louis Mary Fink, O.S.B., on July 17, 1884. After serving as a curate at the cathedral of Leavenworth, Kansas for three months, he was named pastor of St. Joseph's Church in Marshall County. He was transferred to St. Patrick's Church in Parsons in 1888, and to St. Thomas' Church at Armourdale in 1895. From 1898 to 1909, he was rector of Leavenworth Cathedral. He was then sent to Kansas City as pastor of St. Mary's Church.

On November 25, 1910, Ward was appointed the third Bishop of Leavenworth by Pope Pius X. He received his episcopal consecration on February 22, 1911, from Archbishop Diomede Falconio, O.F.M., with Bishops Thomas Francis Lillis and John Joseph Hennessy serving as co-consecrators. He remained as bishop for the next eighteen years, until his death at age 71. Bishop Ward High School in Kansas City, Kansas is named in Ward's honor.

Catholic Church titles
Preceded by Thomas Francis Lillis	Bishop of Leavenworth; 1911–1929	Succeeded by Francis Johannes
