= Schlarman =

Schlarman is a surname. Notable people with the surname include:

- John Schlarman (1975–2020), American football offensive line coach
- Joseph Henry Leo Schlarman (1879–1951), American prelate of the Roman Catholic Church
- Stanley Girard Schlarman (1933–2025), American bishop of the Roman Catholic Church

== See also ==
- Schlarman Academy, Roman Catholic school
