= Roman Catholic Diocese of Kansas City =

Roman Catholic Diocese of Kansas City may refer to one of two dioceses in the United States:

- Diocese of Kansas City–Saint Joseph, Missouri
- Archdiocese of Kansas City in Kansas
