= Sacred Heart Cathedral (Dodge City, Kansas) =

Historic church in Kansas, United States

- U.S. National Register of Historic Places
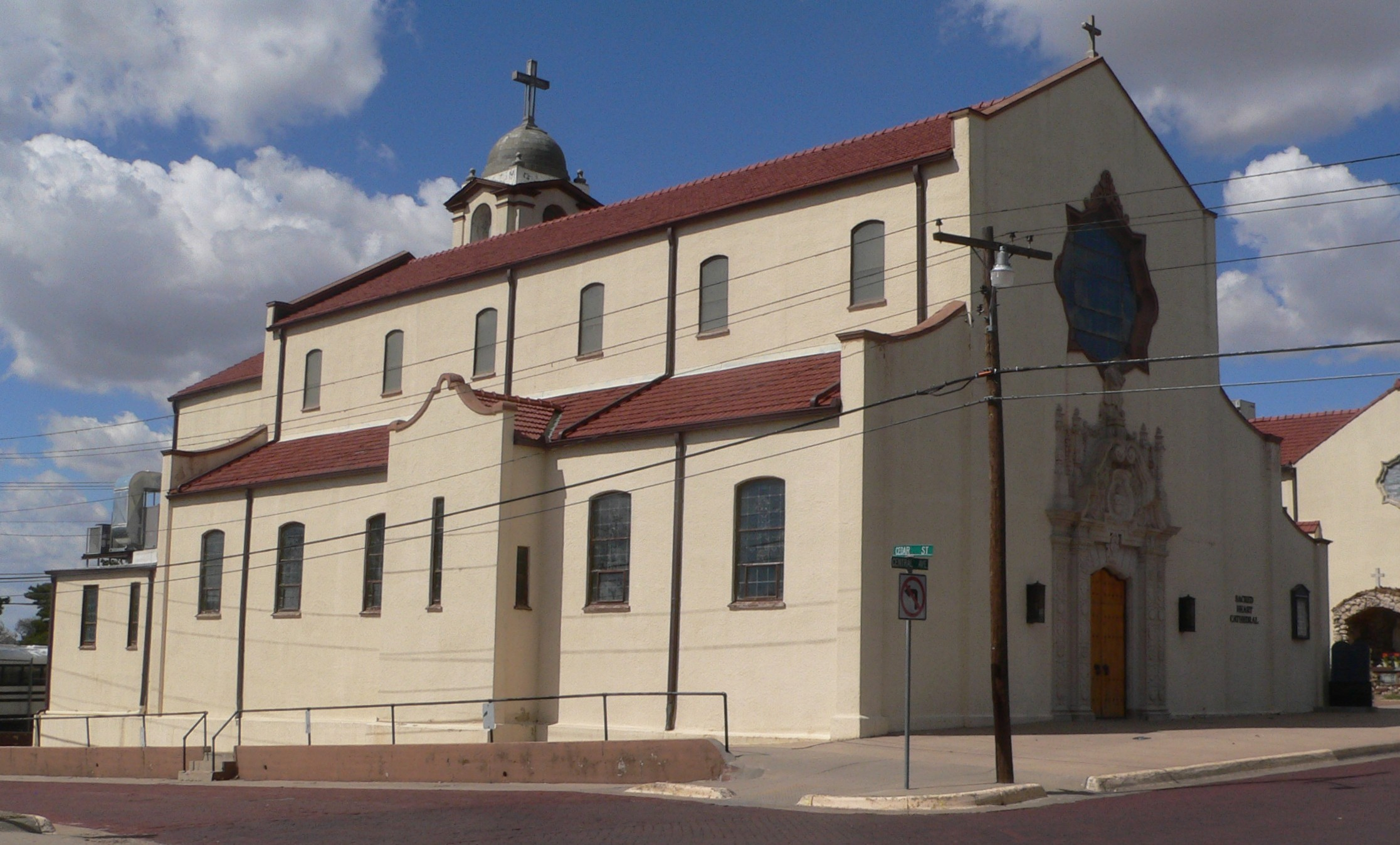
- Sacred Heart Cathedral in 2015

- Location within Kansas Location within the United States
- Location: 903 Central Ave. Dodge City, Kansas
- Coordinates: 37.756478°N 100.016989°W
- Area: Less than one acre
- Built: 1916
- Architect: Ralph Adams Cram
- Architectural style: Mission/Spanish Revival
- NRHP reference No.: 83000426
- Added to NRHP: February 10, 1983

Sacred Heart Cathedral is the former cathedral church for the Roman Catholic Diocese of Dodge City located in Dodge City, Kansas, United States. The church building was listed on the National Register of Historic Places.

== History ==
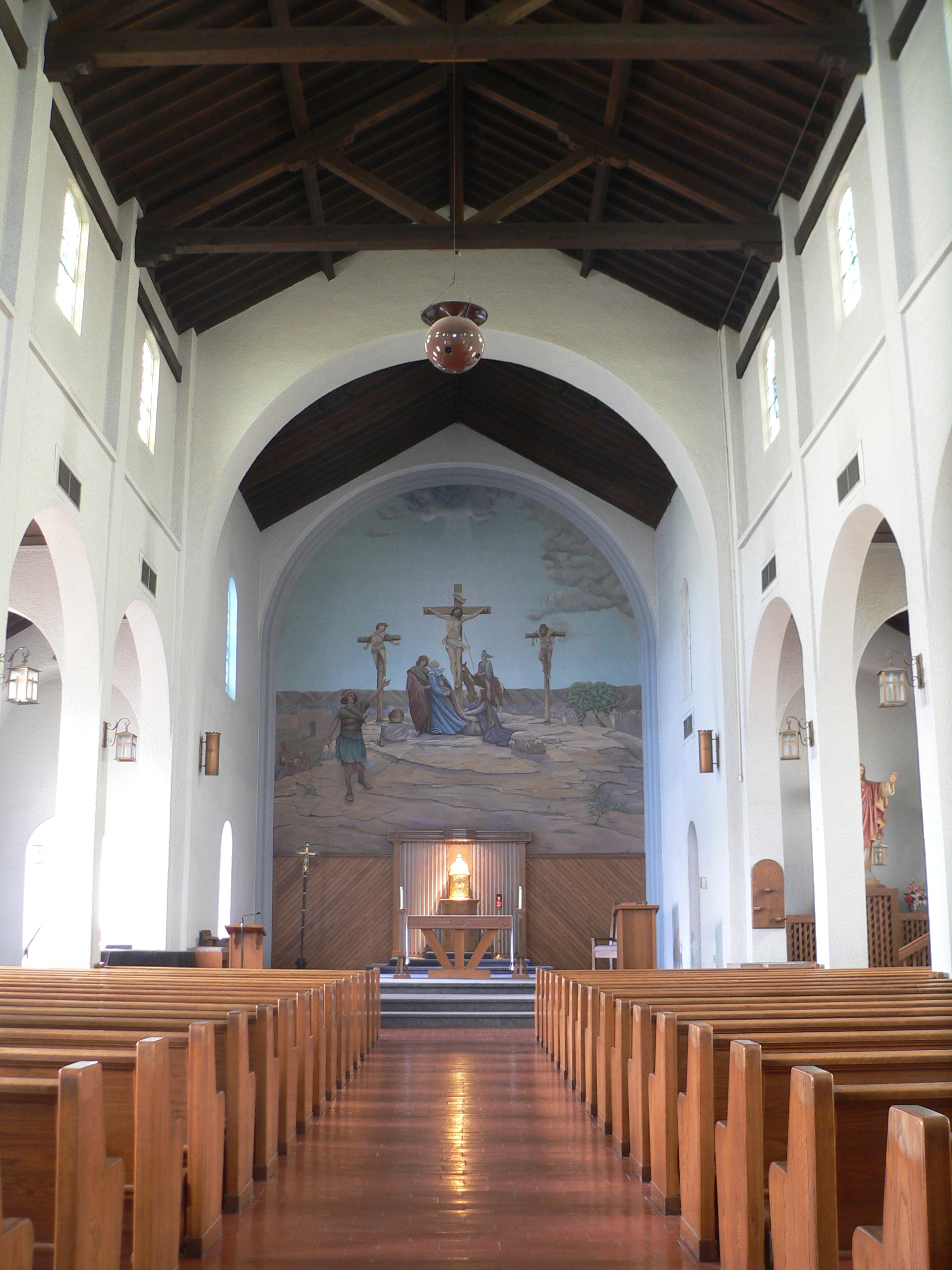
Interior

Early Masses in Dodge City were celebrated in the Union Church, which had been established by local businessmen and was used by various Christian denominations. Priests who celebrated mass there included the Rev. Felix Schwenberg and the Rev. Ferdinand Wolf. The first Sacred Heart Church was a frame Gothic Revival structure completed in 1882. The Rev. John Handly was given the responsibility by Bishop John Hennessy of Wichita to build a new church that could someday be used as a cathedral for a new diocese. Ralph Adams Cram designed the present church, which was built in the Spanish Colonial Revival style. Handly had reportedly done a personal favor for Cram who repaid the favor by providing the plans for the church. Bishop Hennessy dedicated the new church on August 2, 1916.

The old church was remodeled into a school building and Sacred Heart School opened in September of the same year. As the school enrollments grew additions were made to the building in 1929, 1949, and in 1954. The present rectory was added in 1955. All the buildings in the complex were designed in the same style giving the complex a unified appearance. A new confessional was added to the church in 1949.

On May 19, 1951 Pope Pius XII established the Diocese of Dodge City and Sacred Heart Church became the cathedral. The cathedral church was placed on the National Register of Historic Places in 1983. On December 9, 2001, Sacred Heart and Our Lady of Guadalupe parishes in Dodge City merged to form a new parish for the Cathedral of Our Lady of Guadalupe. Sacred Heart Cathedral was retained and used as part of the school facility.

== Architecture ==
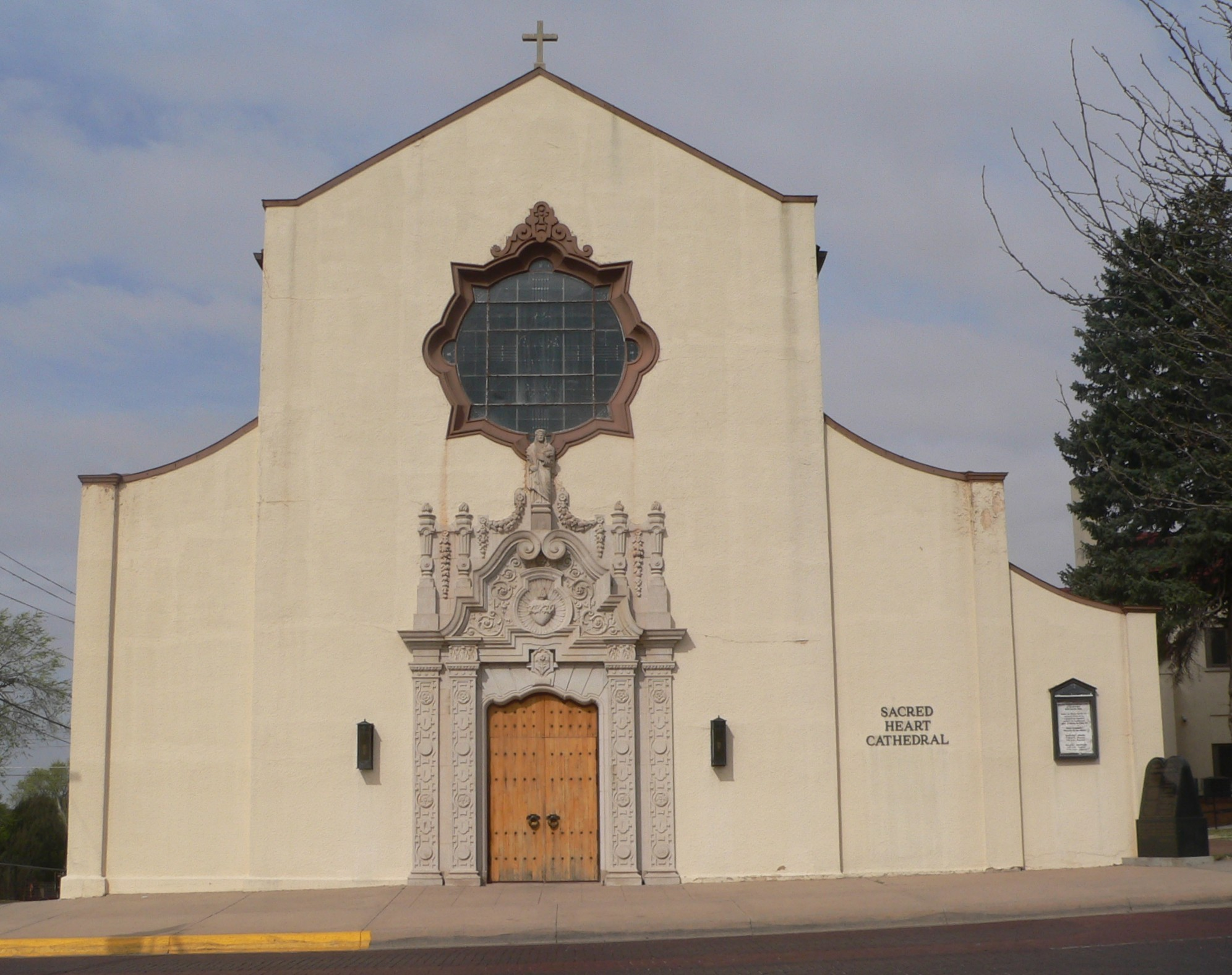
East facade

Sacred Heart Cathedral follows a basilican plan without the apse. It measures 110 by 50 feet (34 by 15 m). A Renaissance-style bell tower on the northwest corner of the building is capped with a silver dome and a cross. The exterior walls are clad in stucco. Semi-elliptical arched windows are located on the north and south walls. The overall simple appearance is broken on the main facade, which features a quatrefoil-star window above an elaborately carved entrance surround done in the Spanish Baroque style.

The interior features open trestle-work that is supported by rounded arches with rough-cast surfaces. The flooring is composed of quarry tile. The mural on the back wall was painted by Topeka artist George Melville Stone. It depicts the crucifixion and he included floral images of the desert region of the American Southwest, Native Americans, and a pinto pony. Three lunettes that are located over the doors of the vestibule depict the Good Samaritan, Good Shepherd, and the Angels at the Tomb. The stained glass windows were created by the Emil Frei Studios of St. Louis, and they were installed in 1948. A simpler altar replaced the original altar in 1967.

== See also ==
- List of Catholic cathedrals in the United States
- List of cathedrals in the United States
