= Diocese of Dodge City =

Latin Catholic jurisdiction in the US

Coordinates: 37°45′35″N 100°01′06″W

Diocese of Dodge City Dioecesis Dodgepolis
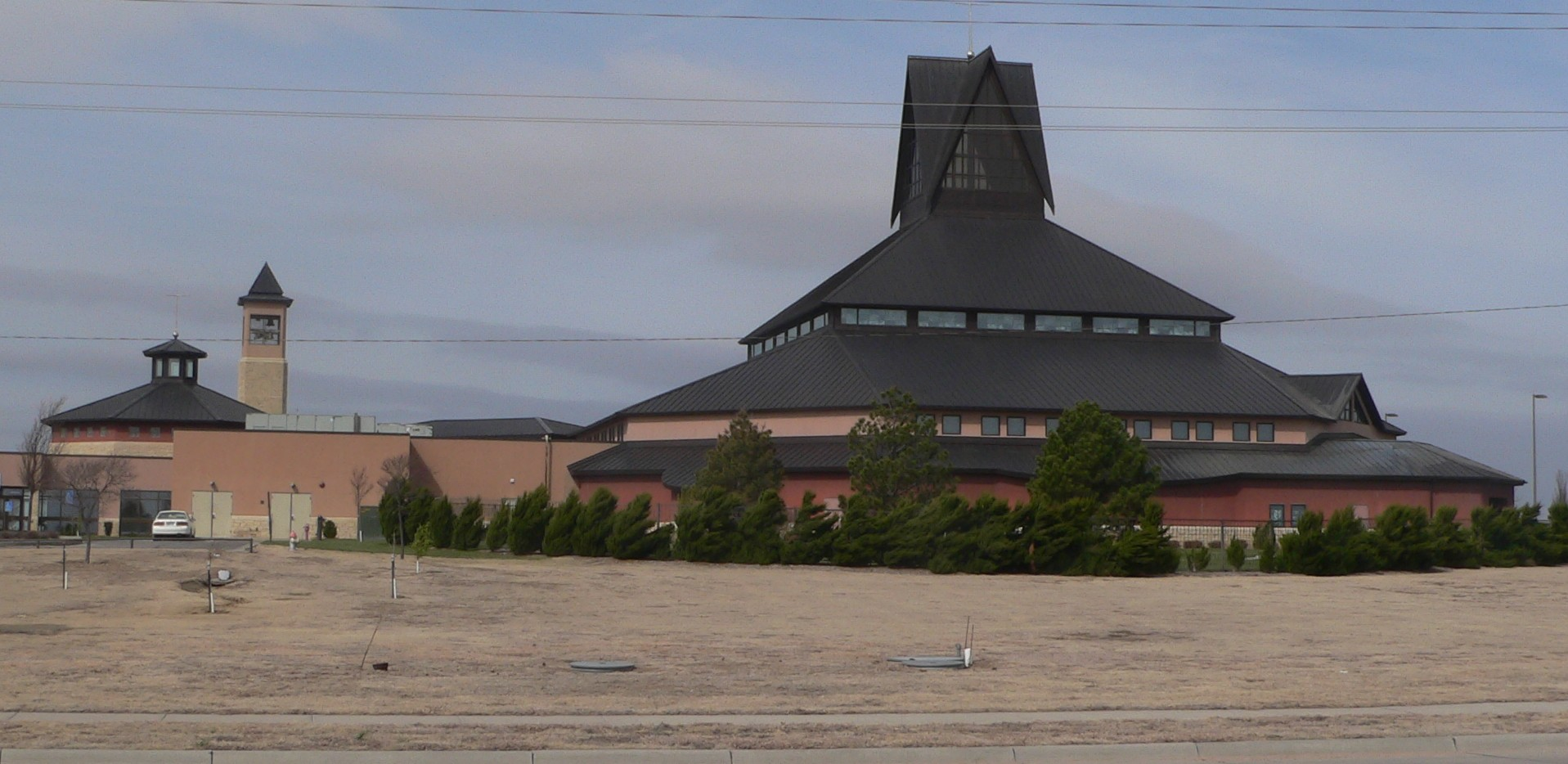
- Cathedral of Our Lady of Guadalupe

- Coat of arms

Location
- Country: United States
- Territory: 28 counties in Southwest Kansas
- Ecclesiastical province: Province of Kansas City in Kansas
- Population: 60,554 (27.2%)

Information
- Denomination: Catholic
- Sui iuris church: Latin Church
- Rite: Roman Rite
- Established: May 19, 1951
- Cathedral: Cathedral of Our Lady of Guadalupe
- Patron saint: Our Lady of Guadalupe; John the Baptist

Current leadership
- Pope: Leo XIV
- Bishop: John Balthasar Brungardt
- Metropolitan Archbishop: William Shawn McKnight
- Bishops emeritus: Ronald Michael Gilmore

Map
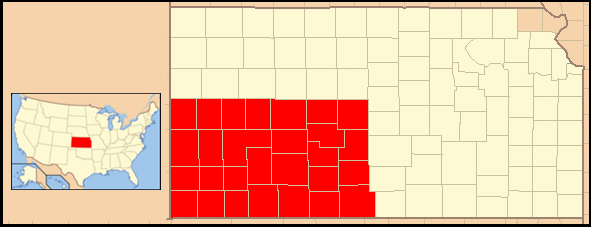

Website
- dcdiocese.org

The Diocese of Dodge City (Latin: Dioecesis Dodgepolis) is a diocese of the Catholic Church in southwestern Kansas in the United States. Created in 1951, it is a suffragan diocese in the ecclesiastical province of the metropolitan Archdiocese of Kansas City in Kansas. John Brungardt is the bishop.

== Territory ==
The Catholic Diocese of Dodge City comprises the following Kansas counties: Barber, Barton, Clark, Comanche, Edwards, Finney, Ford, Grant, Gray, Greeley, Hamilton, Haskell, Hodgeman, Kearny, Kiowa, Lane, Meade, Morton, Ness, Pawnee, Pratt, Rush, Scott, Seward, Stafford, Stanton, Stevens, and Wichita. The diocese encompasses 23,000 square miles.

== History ==
=== 1800 to 1900 ===
In 1850, Pope Pius IX erected the Apostolic Vicariate of Indian Territory East of the Rocky Mountains. This vicariate covered all of the Missouri Territory, which then included the Kansas region. Seven years later, Pius IX create a separate Apostolic Vicariate of Kansas, covering the newly created Kansas Territory. After the establishment of Fort Dodge near present-day Dodge City by the US Army in 1865, priests started visiting it to minister to the Catholic soldiers.

The Diocese of Leavenworth, covering all of Kansas, was erected in 1877 by Pius IX. He named Louis Mary Fink as its first bishop. The first parish in Windhorst was Immaculate Heart of Mary, founded in 1879. In 1882, Sacred Heart was founded as the first parish in Dodge City; a small wood frame church was constructed that year.

Kansas grew so rapidly over the next ten years that Fink petitioned the Vatican to establish two new dioceses in the western part of the state. In 1887, Pope Leo XIII created two dioceses out of western Kansas. The northern counties became the Diocese of Concordia and the southern counties the Diocese of Wichita. The Dodge City area remained part of the Diocese of Wichita for the next 64 years.

=== 1900 to 2000 ===
The Sisters of St. Joseph opened St. Anthony's Hospital in Dodge City in 1926. Today it is St. Catherine Hospital – Dodge City.

In 1951, Pope Pius XII erected the Diocese of Dodge City, taking its territory from the Diocese of Wichita. He named John Baptist Franz as the first bishop of Dodge City. At that time, Sacred Heart Church in Dodge City became the diocesan cathedral. Franz became the bishop of the Diocese of Peoria in 1959. In 1960, Marion Forst was appointed as the second bishop of Dodge City. Pope Paul VI named Forst as auxiliary bishop of the Diocese of Kansas City in 1976.

To replace Forst, Eugene Gerber of Wichita was appointed the third bishop of Dodge City by Paul VI in 1976. In 1982, Pope John Paul II named Gerber as bishop of Wichita. In 1983, Auxiliary Bishop Stanley Schlarman of the Diocese of Belleville became the fourth bishop of Dodge City. During his tenure in Dodge City, Schlarman recruited Burmese, Filipino, and Vietnamese priests; established a diocesan vocations office, a pastoral council, and an office of aging and parenting; and promoted the pastoral ministry training program and Cursillo movement. Schlarman retired as bishop of Dodge City in 1998. Ronald Gilmore was named bishop of Dodge City in 1998.

=== 2000 to present ===
A new cathedral, the Cathedral of Our Lady of Guadalupe, was consecrated in 2001. Our Lady of Guadalupe is the patroness of the diocese. Gilmore retired as bishop of Dodge City in 2010. John Balthasar Brungardt from Wichita replaced Bishop Gilmour.

Brungardt announced in February 2021 that he was temporarily stepping down as bishop of Dodge City while sexual abuse allegations against him were investigated. The Congregation for Bishops at the Vatican appointed Bishop Gerald Vincke of the Diocese of Salina as apostolic administrator of the Diocese of Dodge City. Brungardt resumed his office in March 2022 after being cleared of any crimes.

=== Sex abuse ===
In February 2019, the Kansas Bureau of Investigation (KBI) announced that it had been investigating sex abuse allegations against all the Catholic dioceses in Kansas since November 2018. On August 14, 2020, KBI spokeswoman Melissa Underwood stated, "As of Aug. 7, we have had 205 reports of abuse and have opened 120 cases." In October 2019, the diocese released a list of ten priests and two seminarians with credible accusations of sexual abuse of minors.

== Bishops ==
=== Bishops of Dodge City ===
- John Baptist Franz (1951-1959), appointed Bishop of Peoria
- Marion Francis Forst (1960-1976), appointed Auxiliary Bishop of Kansas City in Kansas
- Eugene John Gerber (1976-1982), appointed Bishop of Wichita
- Stanley Girard Schlarman (1983-1998)
- Ronald Michael Gilmore (1998-2010)
- John Balthasar Brungardt (2011–present)

== Education ==
As of 2026, the Diocese of Dodge City has six elementary schools.
