= Thomas Francis Lillis =

American prelate

His Excellency, The Most Reverend Thomas Francis Lillis
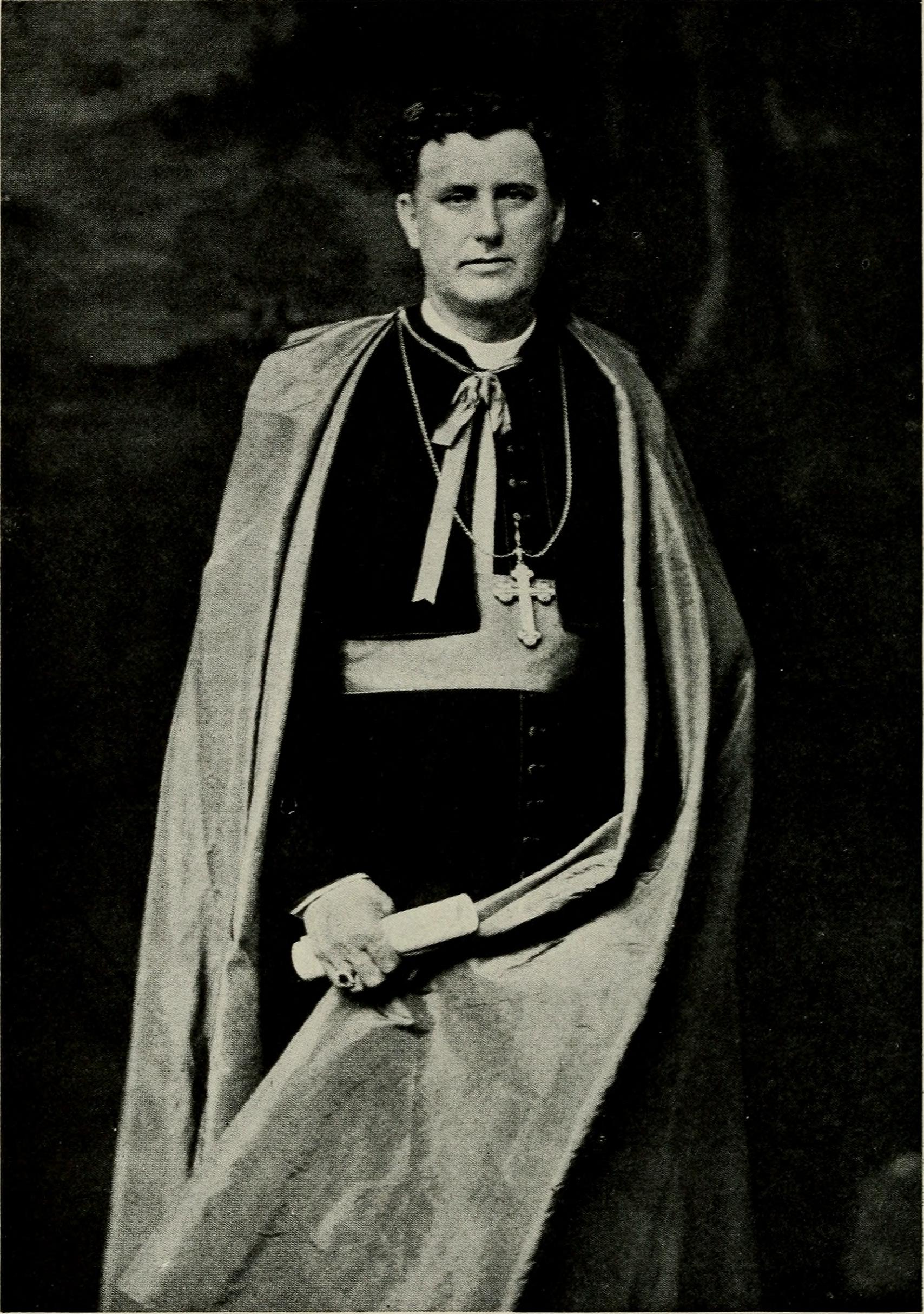
- Diocese: Diocese of Kansas City
- Installed: February 21, 1913
- Term ended: December 29, 1938
- Predecessor: John Joseph Hogan
- Successor: Edwin Vincent O'Hara
- Other posts: Bishop of Leavenworth, Kansas (1905–1910); Coadjutor Bishop of Kansas City (1910–1913)

Orders
- Ordination: August 15, 1885

Personal details
- Born: March 3, 1861 Lexington, Missouri, US
- Died: December 29, 1938 (aged 77) Kansas City, Missouri, US
- Education: Niagara University; St. Benedict College
- Motto: Christus lux vera (Christ is the true light)

Thomas Francis Lillis (March 3, 1861 – December 29, 1938) was an American prelate of the Roman Catholic Church. He served as bishop of the Diocese of Leavenworth in Kansas (1905–1910) and as bishop of the Diocese of Kansas City in Missouri (1913–1938).

== Biography ==
=== Early life ===
One of eleven children, Thomas Lillis was born on March 3, 1861, in Lexington, Missouri, to James and Margaret (née Jordan) Lillis. His parents were both Irish immigrants; his mother was born in County Cork while his father was from County Clare and worked as a railroad contractor and later police commissioner of Kansas City under Governor Meredith Marmaduke.

Thomas Lillis attended public schools in Lafayette County, Missouri. before studying at Niagara University in Lewiston, New York, where he obtained a Bachelor of Arts degree. He completed his theological studies at St. Benedict College in Atchison, Kansas.

=== Priesthood ===
At age 24, Lillis was ordained to the priesthood for the Diocese of Kansas City in Kansas City, Missouri, by Bishop John Joseph Hogan on August 15, 1885. After his ordination, the diocese assigned Lillis as a curate at a parish in Shackleford, Missouri. In 1887, he was appointed pastor of a parish in Kansas City Lillis was appointed rector of St. Patrick's Parish in Kansas City in 1888 and served as vicar general of the diocese.

=== Bishop of Leavenworth ===
On October 24, 1904, Lillis was appointed the second bishop of Leavenworth by Pope Pius X. He received his episcopal consecration on December 27, 1904, from Archbishop John J. Glennon, with Bishops John Hogan and John Francis Cunningham serving as co-consecrators at the Cathedral of the Immaculate Conception in Kansas City, Missouri. He was installed at the Cathedral of St. Peter the Apostle in Leavenworth, Kansas, on January 2, 1905. During his tenure, he established several new congregations, churches, and parochial schools.

=== Coadjutor Bishop and Bishop of Kansas City ===
At the request of the clergy of Missouri, Pope Pius X named Lillis as coadjutor bishop of Kansas City and titular bishop of Cibyra on March 14, 1910. He later succeeded Bishop Hogan as the second bishop of Kansas City upon the latter's death on February 21, 1913. Lillis delivered the invocation at the second session of the 1928 Republican National Convention in Kansas City, Missouri.

In 1933, Lillis drafted a resolution signed by his fellow Catholic bishops in an effort to end lynchings of African-Americans. In 1935, he was appointed an assistant at the pontifical throne by Pope Pius XI. He served at Kansas City for twenty-five years, until his death there on December 29, 1938 at age 77.

Catholic Church titles
Preceded by Louis Mary Fink	Bishop of Leavenworth; 1905–1910	Succeeded by John Chamberlain Ward
Preceded by John Joseph Hogan	Bishop of Kansas City; 1913–1938	Succeeded by Edwin Vincent O'Hara
