= Stanley Girard Schlarman =

American prelate (1933–2025)

His Excellency, The Most Reverend Stanley Girard Schlarman
- Bishop of Dodge City
- Archdiocese: Kansas City in Kansas
- Diocese: Dodge City
- Appointed: March 1, 1983
- Installed: May 4, 1983
- Retired: May 12, 1998
- Predecessor: Eugene John Gerber
- Successor: Ronald Michael Gilmore
- Previous posts: Auxiliary Bishop of Belleville and Titular Bishop of Capreae (1979–1983)

Orders
- Ordination: July 13, 1958 by Luigi Traglia
- Consecration: May 14, 1979 by William Michael Cosgrove, Albert Rudolph Zuroweste, and Philip Francis Murphy

Personal details
- Born: July 27, 1933 Belleville, Illinois, U.S.
- Died: April 28, 2025 (aged 91) Mascoutah, Illinois, US
- Motto: Who is a rock but our God

Styles of Stanley Girard Schlarman
- Reference style: His Excellency; The Most Reverend
- Spoken style: Your Excellency
- Religious style: Bishop

Stanley Girard Schlarman (July 27, 1933 – April 28, 2025) was an American prelate of the Roman Catholic Church. He served as bishop of the Diocese of Dodge City in Kansas from 1983 to 1998 and as an auxiliary bishop of the Diocese of Belleville in Illinois from 1979 to 1983.

== Biography ==
=== Early life ===
Stanley Schlarman was born on July 27, 1933, in Belleville, Illinois, to Cletus and Dorothy (née Lindow) Schlarman. His great-uncle, Bishop Joseph H. Schlarman, served as bishop of Peoria from 1930 to 1951. Stanley Schlarman attended St. Henry's Preparatory Seminary in Belleville before furthering his studies at the Pontifical Gregorian University in Rome.

=== Priesthood ===
Schlarman was ordained to the priesthood for the Diocese of Belleville in Rome by Archbishop Luigi Traglia on July 13, 1958. After returning to Illinois, Schlarman served as a teacher, guidance counselor, and principal at Mater Dei High School in Breese, Illinois. During his tenure at the high school, he was also a part-time associate pastor, director of the Don Bosco Latin School for prospective seminarians in Aviston, Illinois, and pastor of a small parish.

Schlarman obtained his Master of Education degree, with a concentration on counseling and guidance, from St. Louis University in St. Louis, Missouri. He also attended Southern Illinois University in Edwardsville, Illinois. After serving as chaplain to a local Catholic hospital, Schlarman became a pastor in St. Rose Township, Illinois, and later in Cairo, Illinois.

While still at Mater Dei, Schlarman did catechetical work and ministered to mentally and physically challenged children at the Warren G. Murray Developmental Center in Centralia, Illinois. He was the founding director of the Teens Encounter Christ (TEC) program in the diocese a member of the diocesan mediation board, the Priests Personnel Board, and the Senate of Priests.

== Episcopal career ==
=== Auxiliary Bishop of Belleville ===
On March 13, 1979, Pope John Paul II appointed Schlarman as an auxiliary bishop of Belleville and titular bishop of Capreae. He was consecrated on May 14, 1979, by Bishop William Cosgrove, with Bishops Albert Zuroweste and Philip Murphy serving as co-consecrators, at the Cathedral of Saint Peter in Belleville, Illinois. He selected as his episcopal motto, "Who Is A Rock But Our God" from Psalms 18:31.

=== Bishop of Dodge City ===
On March 1, 1983, John Paul II appointed Schlarman as the fourth bishop of Dodge City. He was installed on May 4, 1983, at the Dodge City Civic Center. During his tenure in Dodge City, Schlarman recruited Burmese, Filipino, and Vietnamese priests; established a diocesan Vocations Office, a pastoral council, an Office of Aging and Parenting; and promoted the Pastoral Ministry Training Program and Cursillo movement.

=== Retirement ===
Before Schlarman reached the mandatory retirement age of 75, he sent his letter of resignation as bishop of Dodge City to John Paul II. The pope accepted it on May 12, 1998, and appointed Schlarman as apostolic administrator of the diocese until the installation of his successor, Monsignor Ronald M. Gilmore. On June 2, 2015, Schlarman resigned as vicar general for the diocese.

In 2003, Schlarman was appointed vicar for priests at Joliet Correctional Center in Joliet, Illinois. In 2006, he assumed the same role at Menard Correctional Center in Chester, Illinois.Schlarman died at Brightly Senior Living in Mascoutah, Illinois, on April 28, 2025, at the age of 91.

== See also ==
- Catholic Church hierarchy
- Catholic Church in the United States
- Historical list of the Catholic bishops of the United States
- List of Catholic bishops of the United States
- Lists of patriarchs, archbishops, and bishops

Catholic Church titles
Preceded by Eugene John Gerber	Bishop of Dodge City; 1983–1998	Succeeded by Ronald Michael Gilmore
Preceded by Timothy Manning	Titular Bishop of Capreae; 1979–1983	Succeeded by William Levada
Preceded by —	Auxiliary Bishop of Belleville; 1979–1983	Succeeded by —
