= Francis Johannes =

German-born prelate

Francis Johannes (February 17, 1874 – March 13, 1937) was a German-born prelate of the Roman Catholic Church. He served as Bishop of Leavenworth from 1929 until his death in 1937.

== Biography ==
Francis Johannes was born in Mittelstreu, Bavaria, to Urban and Anna (née Zwierlein) Johannes. He and his family came to the United States arriving in New York, New York on November 8, 1882, aboard the ship General Werder, where they settled at St. Joseph, Missouri. After graduating from St. Benedict's College at Atchison, Kansas in 1892, he attended St. Francis Seminary in Milwaukee, Wisconsin. He was ordained to the priesthood by Bishop Maurice Francis Burke on January 3, 1897. He then engaged in pastoral work in the Diocese of St. Joseph, Missouri.

On December 19, 1927, Johannes was appointed Coadjutor Bishop of Leavenworth, Kansas and Titular Bishop of Thasus by Pope Pius XI. He received his episcopal consecration on May 1, 1928, from Bishop Francis Gilfillan, with Bishops Francis Joseph Tief and Augustus John Schwertner serving as co-consecrators. Following the death of John Chamberlain Ward, he succeeded him as the fourth Bishop of Leavenworth. He remained as bishop for the next seven years, until his death at age 63.

Catholic Church titles
| Preceded by John Chamberlain Ward | Bishop of Leavenworth; 1929–1937 | Succeeded by Paul Clarence Schulte |
