= John Baptist Miège =

The Right Reverend John Baptist Miège, S.J.
- Vicar Apostolic of Kansas
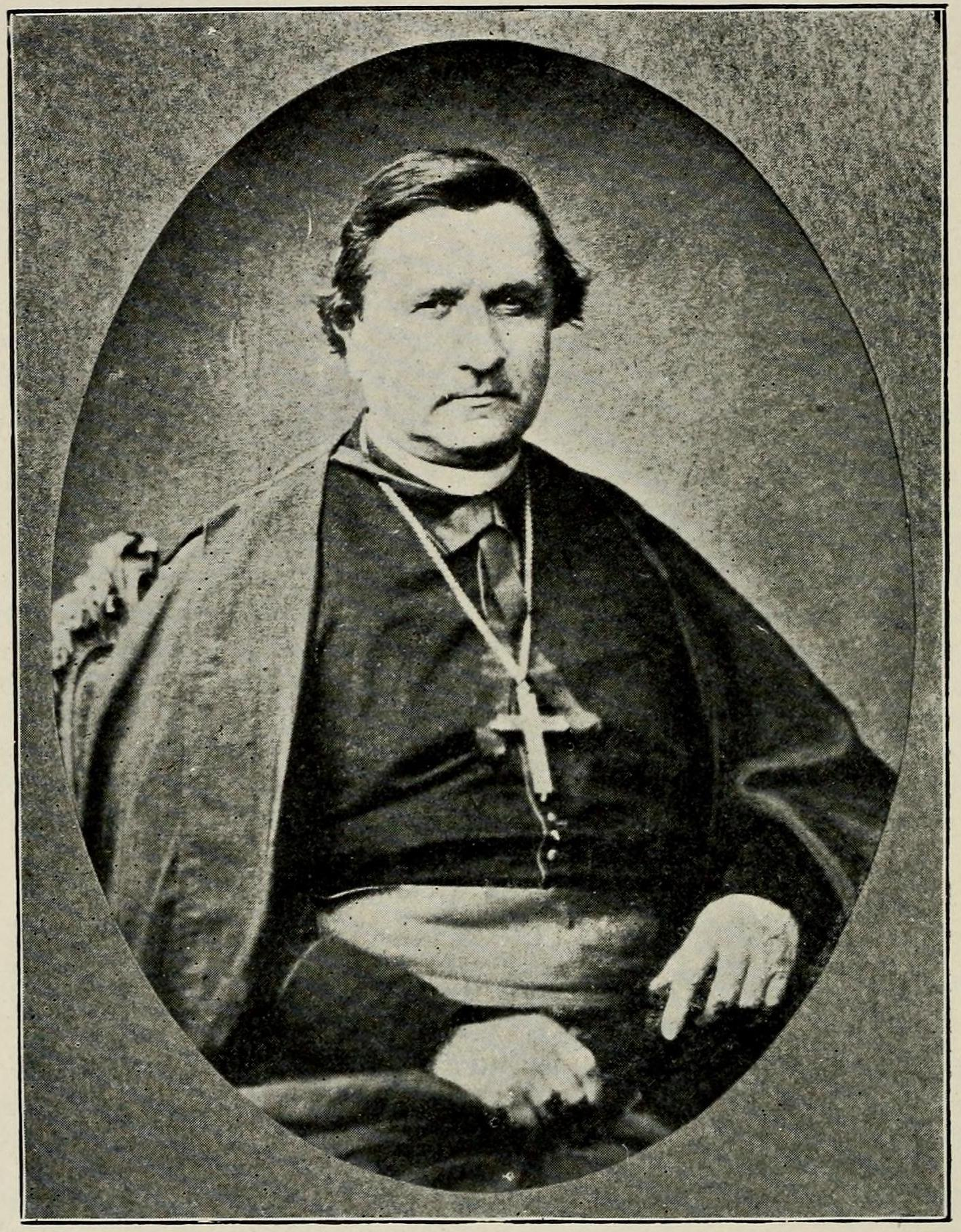
- See: Kansas
- In office: 1857–1874
- Successor: Louis Mary Fink, O.S.B.
- Other posts: Vicar Apostolic of the Indian Territory (1850–1857), Titular Bishop of Messene

Orders
- Ordination: September 7, 1847
- Consecration: March 25, 1851 by Archbishop Peter Richard Kenrick

Personal details
- Born: September 18, 1815 Mercury, Duchy of Savoy, Kingdom of Sardinia
- Died: July 21, 1884 (aged 68) Woodstock, Maryland, United States
- Buried: Woodstock College, Woodstock, Maryland, United States
- Denomination: Roman Catholic

John Baptist Miège, S.J. (September 18, 1815 – July 21, 1884), was a Jesuit prelate and missionary. In addition to a career in education, he served as Vicar Apostolic of Kansas from 1851 to 1874.

== Early life ==
Miège was born in a house called La Forêt, in the village of Mercury (close to Albertville), in the Duchy of Savoy as the youngest son of a wealthy and pious family. At a young age he was committed to the care of his brother Urban, who was director of the diocesan seminary of Moûtiers. After completing his literary course at age 19, he was dissuaded from a career in the army and remained at Moûtiers for two years, studying philosophy.

On October 23, 1836, Miège entered the novitiate of the Society of Jesus (more commonly known as the Jesuits) at Milan, and professed his first vows on October 15, 1838. In 1840 he became chief disciplinarian at the Jesuit boarding school in Milan. He was briefly stationed at Chambéry from 1843 until 1844, when he was sent to further his studies in Rome at the Pontifical Gregorian University.

== Priesthood ==
Miège was ordained to the priesthood in Rome on September 7, 1847. He then resumed his theological studies in 1848, but was soon forced to seek refuge in France following the Revolutions of 1848. In 1849, at his request, he was sent by his superiors to work in the Indian missions in the United States, where he first served as a pastor of St. Charles's Church in Saint Charles, Missouri. He later taught moral theology at the Jesuit house of probation in Florissant, and became prefect of discipline and professor at Saint Louis University in 1851.

== Episcopal ministry ==
On July 23, 1850, Miège was appointed the first Vicar Apostolic for the Indian Territory east of the Rocky Mountains, as well as Titular Bishop of Messene, by Pope Pius IX. As required of Jesuit priests, he initially declined the honor, but was then sent a formal mandate from the Holy See. He received his consecration on March 25, 1851 from Archbishop Peter Richard Kenrick, of St. Louis, with Bishops James Oliver Van de Velde, S.J., the Bishop of Chicago, and Jacques-Maurice De Saint Palais serving as co-consecrators, at St. Xavier's Church in St. Louis. Miège departed St. Louis in May 1851, and later arrived among the Potawatomi on the Kansas River. At that time, his vicariate (which comprised the greater part of what is now Colorado, the Dakotas, Kansas, Montana, Nebraska, and Wyoming) contained five churches, eight priests, and 5,000 Catholics. In May of 1851 he moved to the Jesuit mission at St. Marys, Kansas. On August 15, 1855, he established his cathedral parish, Immaculate Conception, in Leavenworth.

Miège conducted extensive pastoral visitations throughout the wild and remote regions over which his congregation was scattered, visiting the Indian villages, forts, trading posts, and growing towns and celebrating Mass on the rear end of his wagon. He also founded a girls' school for the Osages, placing it under the care of the Sisters of Loretto. In August 1855, he established his episcopal see at the prosperous city of Leavenworth in order to better minister to the growing number of white settlers there. As the number of churches and schools increased, Nebraska was formed into a separate vicariate in 1857 and the Kansas Territory was left under Miège's jurisdiction.

He erected an episcopal residence in 1863, and laid the cornerstone of Immaculate Conception Cathedral in September 1864 and dedicated it in December 1868. The cathedral left the vicariate in a debt of $100,000, which he reduced by about half after a trip to South America. He then attended the First Vatican Council from 1869 to 1870. In 1871, desiring a return to the private ranks of the Jesuits, Miège sent his petition to be relieved of his office to the Holy See, which instead gave him Louis Mary Fink, O.S.B., as a coadjutor. His resignation as Vicar Apostolic was later accepted on November 18, 1874. He left 48 priests and 71 churches.

== Later life ==
In January 1874, Miège briefly resumed his duties at St. Louis University. He was then assigned to the Jesuit seminary at Woodstock, Maryland, there serving as a spiritual director. From there he was sent in 1877 to Detroit, Michigan, where he founded Detroit College and served as its first president.

Miège returned to Woodstock in 1880, and was stricken with paralysis in 1883. He later died there, aged 68. There are reports that he received a burn while in Woodstock that contributed to his death.

Catholic Church titles
Preceded by Joannes Bapt. Belland	Titular Bishop of Messene; 1850–1884	Succeeded by Luigi Bonetti
New title	Vicar Apostolic of Indian Territory East of the Rocky Mountains; 1850–1857	Title renamed
New title	Vicar Apostolic of Kansas; 1857–1874	Succeeded by Louis Mary Fink, O.S.B.
Academic offices
Preceded by New Title	President of the Detroit College; 1877–1880	Succeeded by James G. Walshe S.J.
