= Cathedral of Our Lady of Guadalupe (Kansas) =

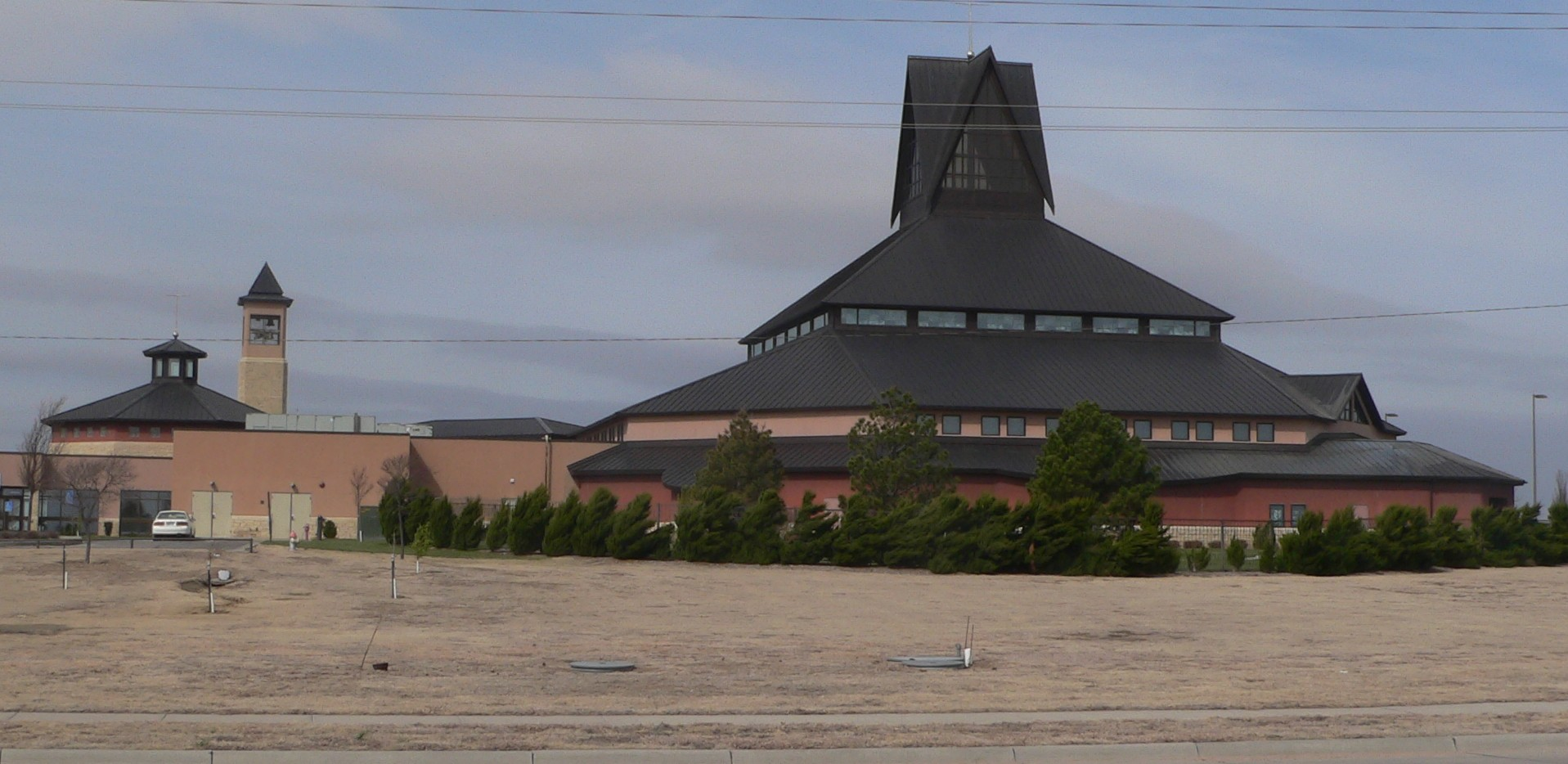

- Location in Kansas
- 37°47′37″N 100°02′05″W
- Location: 3231 N. 14th St. Dodge City, Kansas
- Country: United States
- Denomination: Roman Catholic
- Website: dodgecitycathedral.com

History
- Status: Cathedral/Parish church
- Founded: 2001
- Dedication: Our Lady of Guadalupe
- Consecrated: December 9, 2001

Architecture
- Architect: Hilter
- Style: Postmodern
- Groundbreaking: May 20, 2000
- Completed: 2001

Specifications
- Capacity: 1,400
- Height: 106 feet (32 m)
- Materials: Silverdale limestone, copper

Administration
- Province: Kansas City
- Diocese: Dodge City

Clergy
- Bishop: Most Rev John Brungardt
- Rector: Rev Wesley Schawe

The Cathedral of Our Lady of Guadalupe is a Catholic cathedral and parish church in Dodge City, Kansas, in the United States. It is the seat of the Diocese of Dodge City.

== History ==
=== Sacred Heart and Our Lady of Guadalupe Churches ===
The early predecessors to the Cathedral of Our Lady were two churches in Dodge City: Sacred Heart and Our Lady of Guadalupe. During the 1870s, the Catholics in Dodge City did not have their own parish. Visiting priests from the Diocese of Leavenworth, which had jurisdiction over all of Kansas, would hold services at Union Church, a Protestant church in Dodge City.

The first parish in Dodge City was Sacred Heart, established in 1882. Its first church was a wooden Gothic Revival structure. In 1877, Dodge City became part of the new Diocese of Wichita. Our Lady of Guadalupe Parish built its first church early in the 20th century. Sacred Heart built a second church in 1916 and Our Lady of Guadalupe in 1950.

=== Sacred Heart Cathedral ===
On May 19, 1951, Pope Pius XII established the Diocese of Dodge City and designated Sacred Heart Church as Sacred Heart Cathedral. Between 1995 and 1998 the diocese went through a restructuring process and the Dodge City parishes needed larger church buildings. The diocese also had a need for a larger space for diocesan liturgies.

During the episcopate of Bishop Ronald Gilmore, the diocese decided to merge Sacred Heart Cathedral and Our Lady of Guadalupe Parishes in a new cathedral building.They selected Robert Habiger of the Albuquerque architectural firm of Dekker/Perich/Sabatini to design the new cathedral. The groundbreaking for the cathedral was on May 20, 2000, with containers of soil from every parish in the diocese added to the cathedral site.

=== Our Lady of Guadalupe Cathedral ===
Our Lady of Guadalupe Cathedral was consecrated on December 9, 2001. The first parish mass was celebrated by Reverend Ted Skalsky three days later.

== Architecture ==
=== Cathedral exterior ===
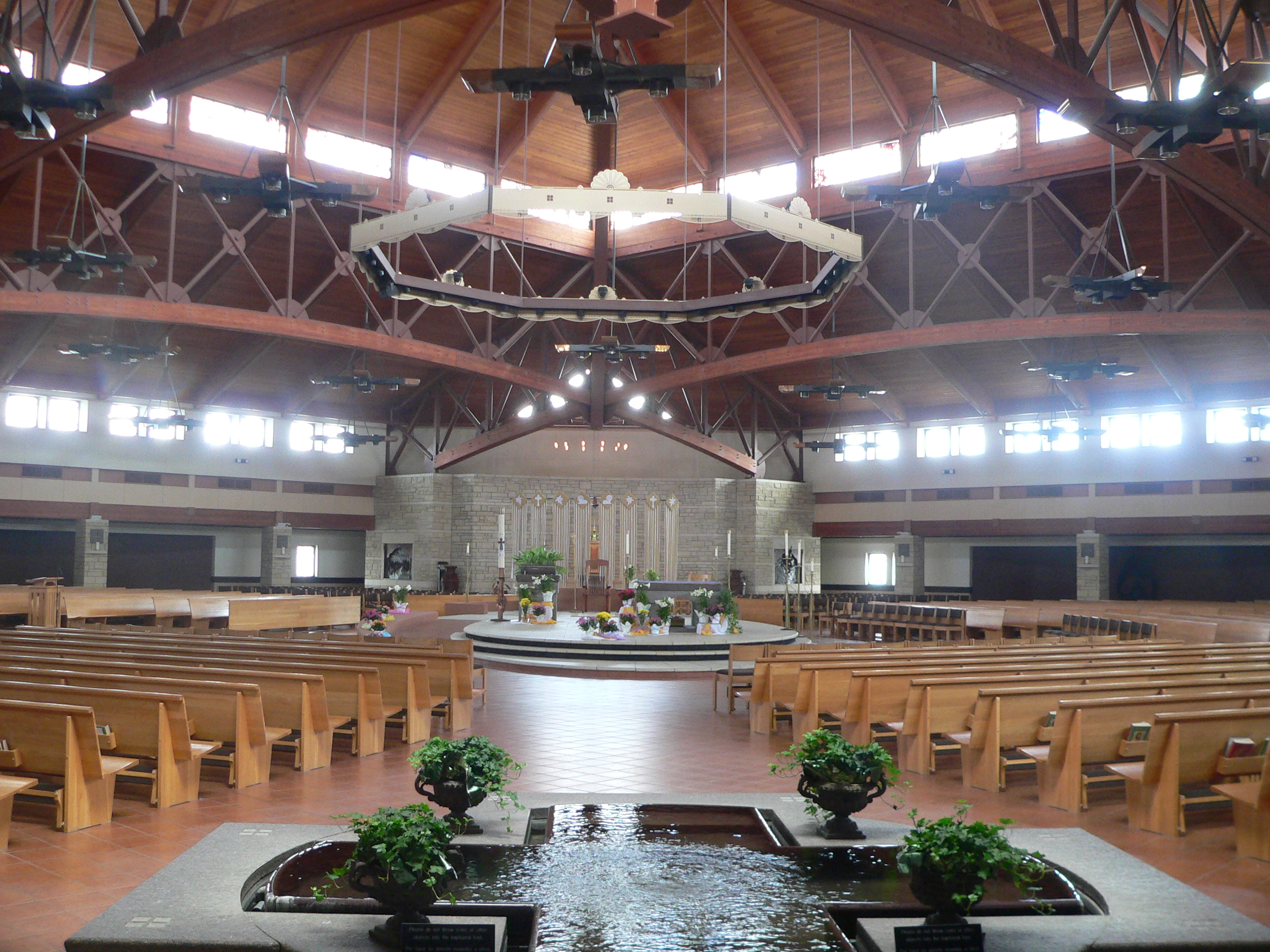
Cathedral interior (2016)

The cathedral itself is an octagonal structure clad in Silverdale limestone that was mined near Arkansas City, Kansas. The bell tower is 77 feet (23 m) tall and is separate from the building. The cathedral has a copper roof The building is accessed through a plaza that fronts the cathedral. The center of the plaza has a fire pit that is used at the Easter Vigil. The worship space itself is accessed through a gathering space.

The main entrance to the cathedral has copper doors that are 14 feet (4.3 m) tall. The copper handles on the doors are shaped like grape vines.

=== Cathedral interior ===
The pews in the cathedral are made of white oak and provide seating for 1,430 worshippers. The altar and the ambo are both granite. The cathedra and the processional cross were carved from Cuban mahogany. The cathedra also contains ziricote from Mexico. The tabernacle sits on a granite pedestal and rises 7 feet (2.1 m) from the floor. It is constructed of polished bronze and Cuban mahogany.The Colorado artist Hubero Maestas created the Stations of the Cross and the main crucifix. The baptismal font is shaped like a cross. The sanctuary floor is covered with limestone blocks. The Sacred Heart Chapel was named in honor of the first cathedral in the diocese. It contains its own altar and ambo.

=== Shrines ===
The cathedral interior has seven shrines:

- Our Lady of Guadalupe – This shrine honors Our Lady of Guadalupe, who appeared before two men in Mexico in 1531. The image of the Our Lady was created in 1950 by the Mexican artist Tobias Villaneuvo. It is draped in cloth made by the Sisters of Christ the King in Siloa.
- Patrons of Religious Orders – This shrine contains statues of eleven saints who represent the religious institutes that have served in the diocese. The statues are carved in the Santo style of Spain and Latin America
- Holy Family – This shrine contains statues of Jesus, Mary and Joseph carved from linden wood.
- St. Therese of Lisieux – This shrine honors Therese of Lisieux with a bronze statue. She was a French nun and doctor of the church from the 19th century.
- St. Isidore and St. Maria de la Cabeza – This shrine honors Isidore the Laborer, a Spanish farmer of the 12th century who helped the poor. Maria Torribia was his wife, a woman said to have performed miracles.
- St. Maria Goretti – This shrine honors Maria Goretti, a 19th century Italian martyr slain during a sexual assault.
Cathedral images

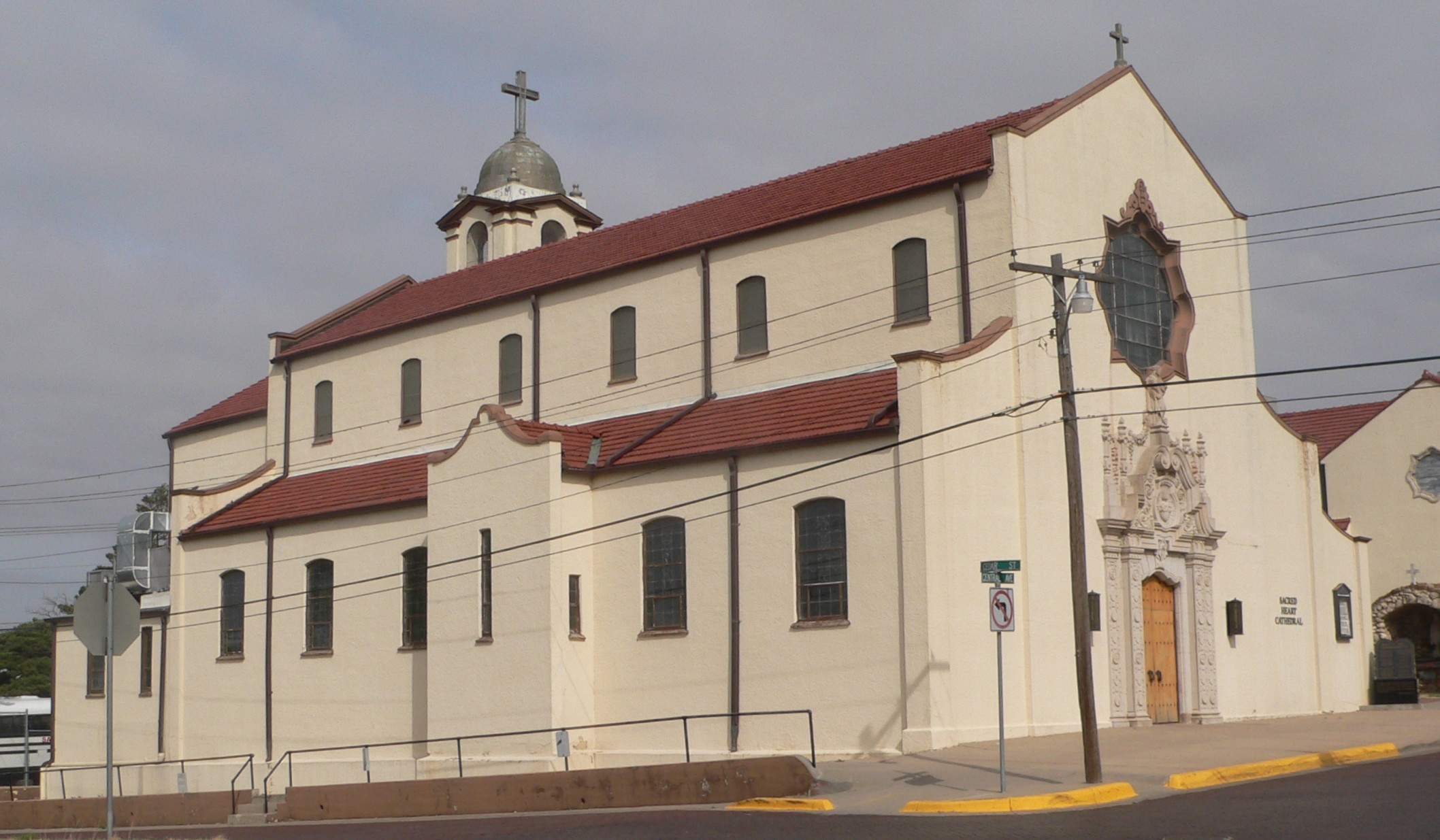
Former Sacred Heart Cathedral, Dodge City (2016)

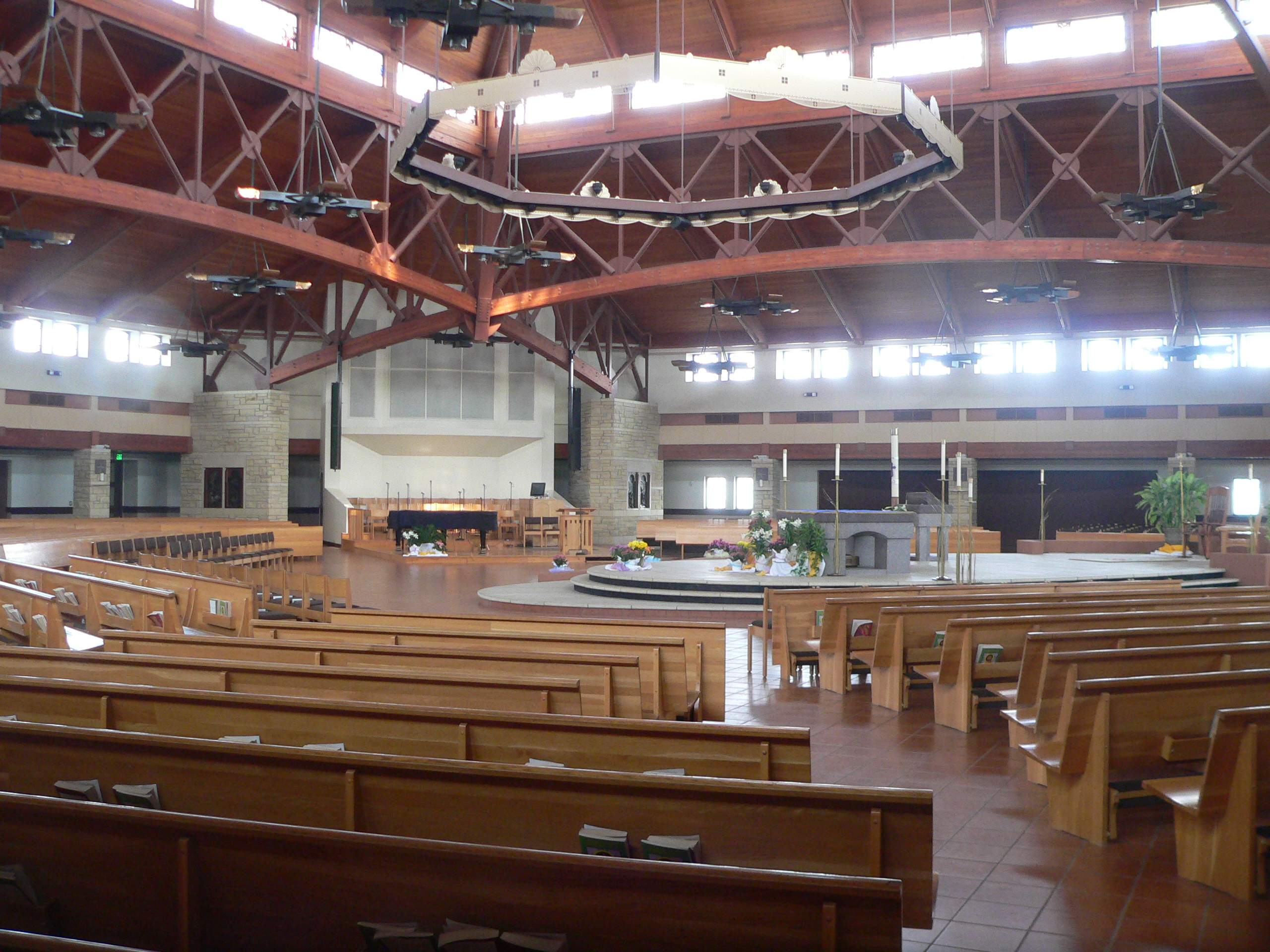
Interior, Our Lady of Guadalupe (2016)

== See also ==
- List of Catholic cathedrals in the United States
- List of cathedrals in the United States
