= George Joseph Donnelly =

American prelate

- Bishop of Kansas City in Kansas
- Church: Catholic Church
- Diocese: Diocese of Kansas City in Kansas
- In office: November 9, 1946 – December 13, 1950
- Predecessor: Paul Clarence Schulte
- Successor: Edward Joseph Hunkeler
- Previous posts: Titular Bishop of Coela (1940-1946); Auxiliary Bishop of St. Louis (1940-1946)

Orders
- Ordination: June 12, 1921 by John J. Glennon
- Consecration: April 23, 1940 by John J. Glennon

Personal details
- Born: April 23, 1889 Maplewood, St. Louis, Missouri, United States
- Died: December 13, 1950 (aged 61)
- Motto: Domine Ut Videam

George Joseph Donnelly (April 23, 1889 – December 13, 1950) was an American prelate of the Roman Catholic Church who served as bishop of the Diocese of Leavenworth (1946–1947) and the Diocese of Kansas City in Kansas (1947–1950).

== Biography ==
Donnelly was born in St. Louis, Missouri, and studied at Kenrick Seminary before being ordained to the priesthood on June 12, 1921. He was named chancellor of the Archdiocese of St. Louis in 1929.

On March 19, 1940, he was appointed Auxiliary Bishop of St. Louis and Titular Bishop of Coela by Pope Pius XII. He received his episcopal consecration on the following April 23 from Archbishop John J. Glennon, with Bishops Christian Herman Winkelmann and Paul Clarence Schulte serving as co-consecrators.

He was named the sixth Bishop of Leavenworth, Kansas on November 9, 1946. The diocese was renamed as the Diocese of Kansas City in Kansas May 10, 1947. He remained as bishop until his death at age 61.

Catholic Church titles
Preceded by –	Auxiliary Bishop of St. Louis; 1940–1946	Succeeded by –
Preceded by Joseph Walsh	Titular Bishop of Coela; 1940–1946	Succeeded by Cândido Bento Maria Penso
Preceded by Paul Clarence Schulte	Bishop of Leavenworth; 1946–1947	Title renamed
New title	Bishop of Kansas City in Kansas; 1947–1950	Succeeded by Edward Joseph Hunkeler
