= Louis Mary Fink =

German-born Benedictine monk and prelate

The Right Reverend Louis Mary Fink, O.S.B.
- Bishop of Leavenworth
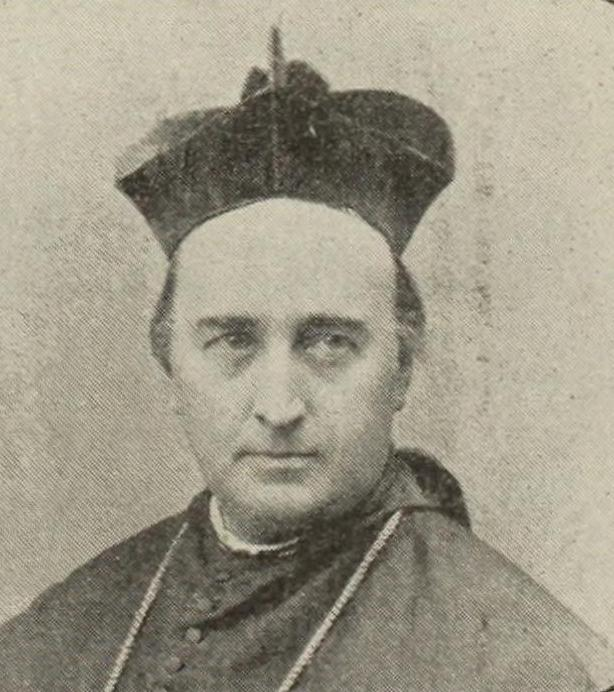
- Church: Catholic
- Province: St. Louis
- Diocese: Leavenworth
- Installed: May 22, 1877
- Term ended: March 17, 1904
- Predecessor: John Baptist Miège, S.J.
- Successor: Thomas F. Lillis
- Other posts: Vicar Apostolic of Kansas (1874–1877); Coadjutor Vicar Apostolic of Kansas (1871–1874); Prior, St. Benedict's Abbey (1868–1871)

Orders
- Ordination: May 28, 1857 by Joshua M. Young
- Consecration: June 11, 1871 by Thomas P. Foley

Personal details
- Born: Michael Fink; July 12, 1834 Triftersberg, Roding, Kingdom of Bavaria
- Died: March 17, 1904 (aged 69) Leavenworth, Kansas, United States
- Buried: Convent Cemetery, Leavenworth, Kansas, United States

Louis Mary Fink, O.S.B., (July 12, 1834 – March 17, 1904) was a German-born Benedictine monk and prelate of the Roman Catholic Church. He was the first Bishop of Leavenworth (1877–1904).

== Biography ==
He was born Michael Fink in the village of Triftersberg, now part of the town of Roding, Bavaria, to Peter and Barbara (née Hecht) Fink. He received his classical training at the gymnasium and Latin school in Regensburg.

In 1852 Fink emigrated to the United States and, feeling a call to the religious life, was received by Archabbot Boniface Wimmer that September into Saint Vincent Archabbey in Latrobe, Pennsylvania. He made his profession as a monk on January 6, 1854, taking the religious name of Louis Mary. After completing his theological studies at Saint Vincent Seminary, Fink was ordained to the priesthood by Joshua Maria Young, Bishop of Erie, on May 28, 1857.

Fink first labored as a missionary in Bellefonte and in Newark, New Jersey. He was then named pastor in Covington, Kentucky, where he erected a church and a convent of Benedictine nunss. He afterwards became pastor of St. Joseph's Church in Chicago, where he was forced to build a larger church for $80,000 when the congregation outgrew the old one and where he also established a school. On June 18, 1868, Fink became prior of St. Benedict's Abbey in Atchison, Kansas. He soon reopened Benedictine College, which had closed the previous year due to lack of funding. He sought to pay off the abbey's debt, but his efforts were made difficult by the deflation following the Civil War.

On March 1, 1871, Fink was appointed Coadjutor Vicar Apostolic of Kansas and Titular Bishop of Eucarpia by Pope Pius IX. He received his episcopal consecration in Chicago on the following June 11 from Thomas Foley, the Coadjutor Bishop of Chicago, with Bishops John Baptiste Miège, S.J., under whom he was to serve, and Joseph Melcher serving as co-consecrators.

Following the resignation of Miège, Fink succeeded him as Vicar Apostolic of Kansas on November 18, 1874. The vicariate was later established as the Diocese of Leavenworth on May 22, 1877, and Fink was named its first Bishop. He attended the Third Plenary Council of Baltimore in 1884, and oversaw the erection of the Dioceses of Wichita and Concordia in 1887. At the beginning of his tenure, the diocese contained 65 priests, 88 churches, 13 parochial schools, and nearly 25,000 Roman Catholics. By the time of his death, there were 110 priests, 100 churches, 13 stations and chapels, 37 parochial schools, and roughly 35,000 Roman Catholics.

Fink died at age 69 in 1904. He was interred at Convent Cemetery in Leavenworth.

Catholic Church titles
Preceded by John Baptiste Miège	Vicar Apostolic of Kansas; 1874–1877	Title changed
New title	Bishop of Leavenworth; 1877–1904	Succeeded by Thomas Francis Lillis
