= Archdiocese of Kansas City in Kansas =

Latin Catholic jurisdiction in the US

Coordinates: 39°07′38″N 94°52′27″W

Archdiocese of Kansas City in Kansas Archidioecesis Metropolitae Kansanopolitana in Kansas
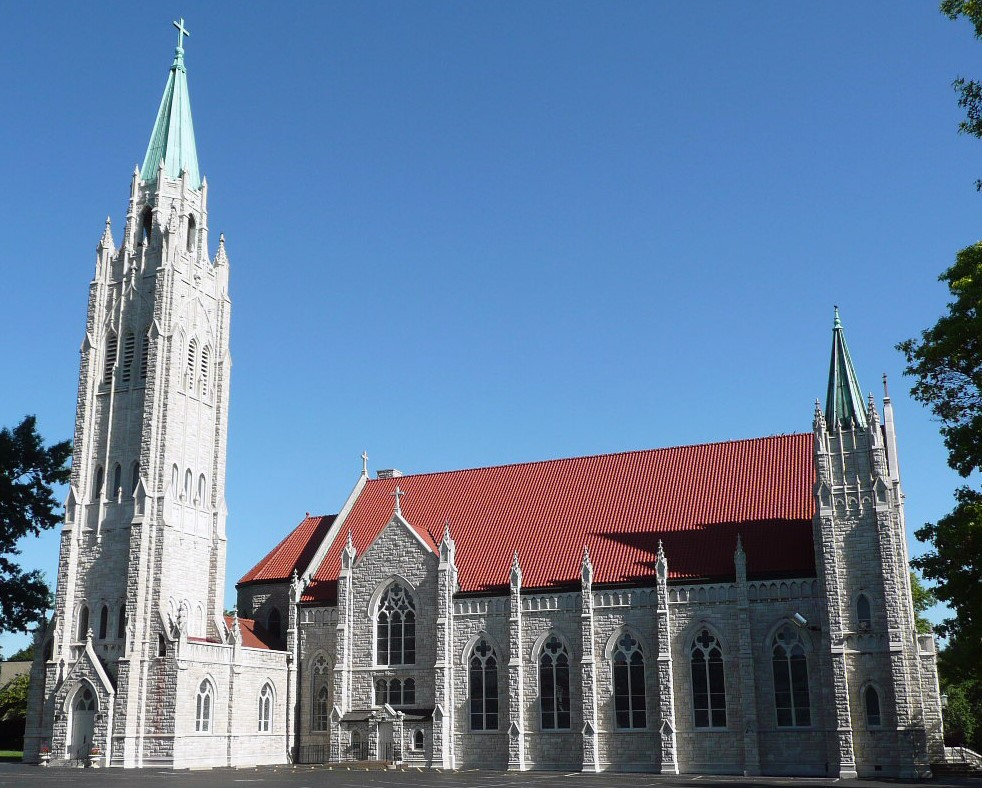
- Cathedral of St. Peter the Apostle

- Coat of Arms of the Archdiocese of Kansas City in Kansas

Location
- Country: United States
- Territory: 21 Counties in Northeast Kansas
- Ecclesiastical province: Kansas City in Kansas

Statistics
- Area: 12,524 sq mi (32,440 km^{2})
- Population: Total; Catholics: (as of 2012); 1,320,000; in 2011: 205,531 (16.8%)
- Parishes: 120

Information
- Denomination: Catholic Church
- Sui iuris church: Latin Church
- Rite: Roman Rite
- Established: May 22, 1877 as the Diocese of Leavenworth; May 10, 1947 as the Diocese of Kansas City in Kansas
- Cathedral: Cathedral of St. Peter the Apostle
- Patron saint: Immaculate Conception; John Mary Vianney

Current leadership
- Pope: Leo XIV
- Metropolitan Archbishop: William Shawn McKnight
- Vicar General: Very Reverend Michael Hawken
- Bishops emeritus: Joseph Fred Naumann

Map
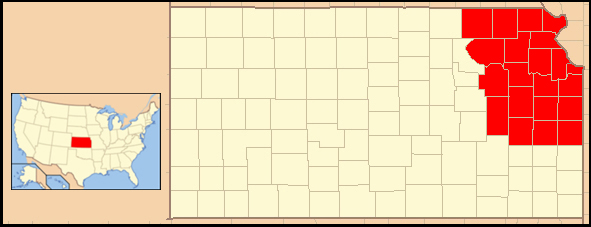

Website
- archkck.org

The Archdiocese of Kansas City in Kansas (Latin: Archidioecesis Kansanopolitana in Kansas) is an archdiocese of the Catholic Church in eastern Kansas in the United States. The archbishop's episcopal seat is located at the Cathedral Church of Saint Peter in Kansas City, Kansas. The Archdiocese is a metropolitan see with three suffragan dioceses: the Dioceses of Dodge City, Salina, and Wichita.

== Territory ==
The Archdiocese of Kansas City in Kansas comprises the following counties:

- Anderson
- Atchison
- Brown
- Coffey
- Doniphan
- Douglas
- Franklin
- Jackson
- Jefferson
- Johnson
- Leavenworth
- Linn
- Lyon
- Marshall
- Miami
- Nemaha
- Osage
- Pottawatomie
- Shawnee
- Wabaunsee
- Wyandotte

== History ==
=== 1540 to 1857 ===
The earliest Catholic presence in present-day Kansas was during the 1540s, when Juan de Padilla, the Spanish missionary priest, accompanied the Spanish explorer Francisco Vázquez de Coronado on his expedition through the region.

During the 18th century, present-day Kansas was under the jurisdictions of Spain and France. The few Catholics in the area were governed by the Diocese of Louisiana and the Two Floridas, based in New Orleans. After the Louisiana Purchase of 1803, Kansas became part of the United States.

The Vatican in 1826 erected the Diocese of St. Louis, which included Kansas and the vast Missouri Territory. During the early 1800s, Catholic missionaries started building chapels for their Native American converts. In 1847, Jesuit priests established the St. Mary's Mission in St. Marys, Kansas, along the Oregon Trail, to evangelize the Potawatomi people.

Pope Pius IX in 1850 erected the Vicariate Apostolic of Indian Territory East of the Rocky Mountains. This huge jurisdiction contained the present-day states of Kansas, Nebraska, North and South Dakota, Colorado, Wyoming, and Montana. The pope named John Miège from St. Louis as the vicar apostolic.

Miège arrived in 1851 at an Potawatomi encampment on the Kansas River. At that time, his vicariate contained five churches, eight priests, and 5,000 Catholics. He then moved to the Jesuit mission at St. Marys. Miège conducted extensive pastoral visitations throughout the vicariate, visiting Native American villages, forts, trading posts, and growing towns. He would celebrate mass at these stops on the rear end of his wagon.

Miège founded a girls' school for the Osages Nation, placing it under the supervision of the Sisters of Loretto. In 1855, Miège established his episcopal see in Leavenworth, Kansas, in order to better minister to the growing number of Catholic European settlers there. By this time, the vicariate had a Catholic population of 5,000, with 3,000 Native American converts. It was served by eight priests in 11 missions and 18 stations.

=== 1857 to 1877 ===
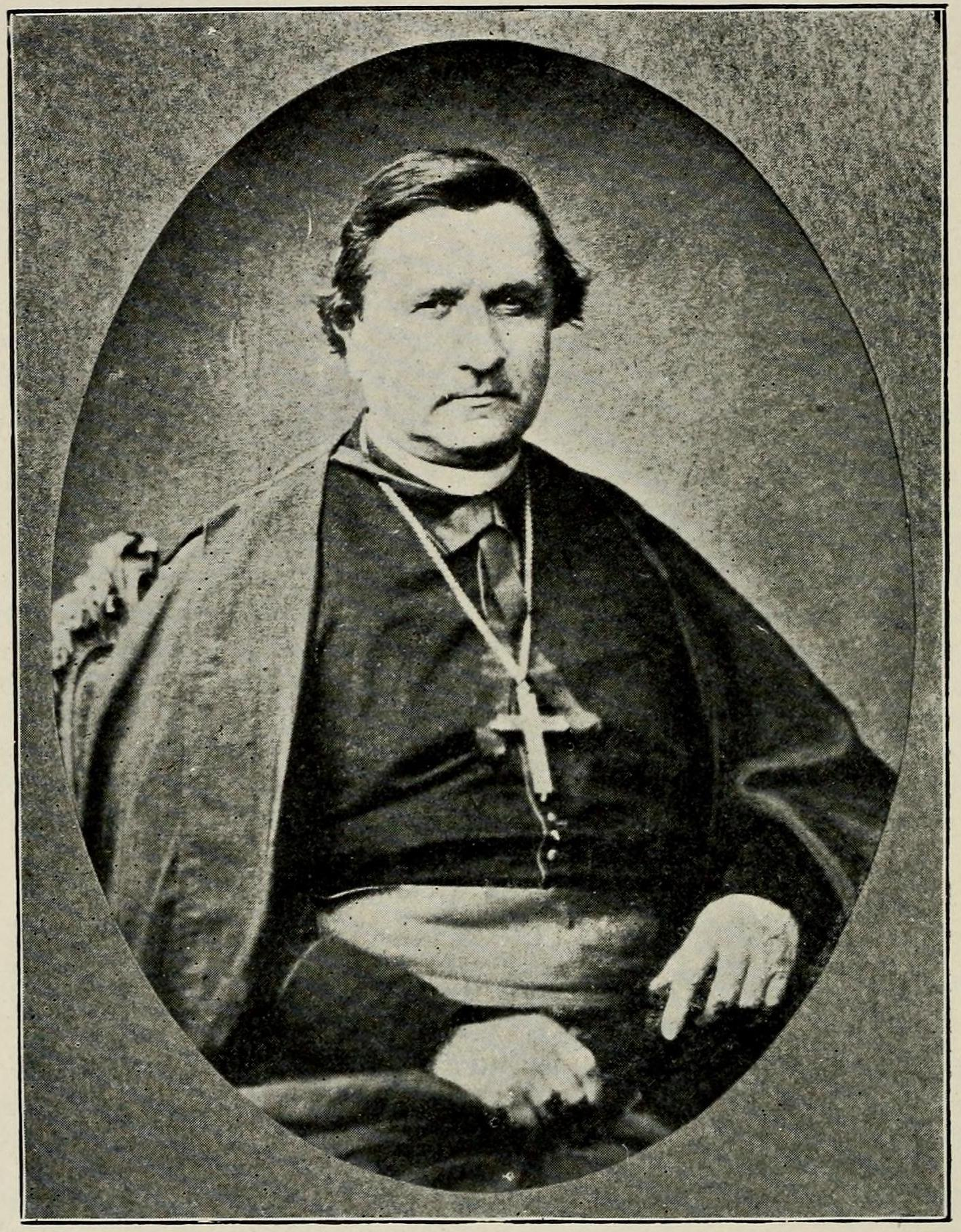
Bishop Miège (pre-1921)

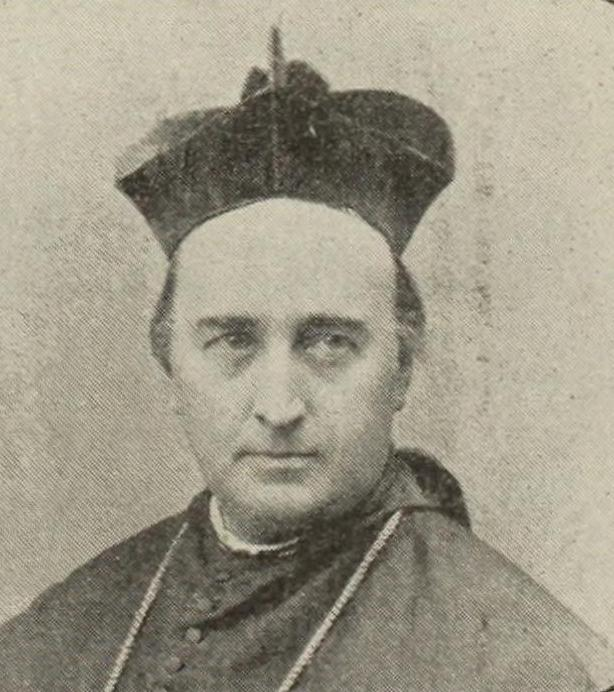
Bishop Fink (1889)

In 1857, the Vatican suppressed the Vicariate of the Indian Territory, creating instead the Vicariate of Kansas, including all of Kansas. Miège was made vicar of the new vicariate. The first Catholic church in Kansas City, Kansas, was St. Mary's, founded in 1858. In Topeka, Assumption Parish was the first in that city, starting in 1862. Miège erected an episcopal residence in Leavenworth in 1863. That same year, the Benedictine Sisters founded the Mount St. Scholastica convent in Atchison, Kansas. Miège laid the cornerstone of Immaculate Conception Cathedral in that same city in 1864 and dedicated the cathedral in 1868.

In 1871, Pius IX named Louis Fink as coadjutor vicar apostolic to assist Miège with his duties. The Vatican allowed Miège to resign as vicar in 1874 so he could pursue other positions in the church. Fink automatically became the second apostolic vicar of Kansas. At the beginning of Fink's tenure in 1874, the vicariate contained 65 priests, 88 churches, 13 parochial schools, and a Catholic population of approximately 25,000.

=== 1877 to 1947 ===
In 1877, Pope Leo XIII replaced the Vicariate of Kansas with the Diocese of Leavenworth, covering all of Kansas. By 1881, the number of Catholics in the diocese had risen to 60,000. The first Catholic newspaper was founded in Olathe in 1882. As the population of Kansas grew, Leo XIII in 1887 erected the Dioceses of Concordia and Wichita, taking territory from the Diocese of Leavenworth. The pope made Fink the first bishop of the new Diocese of Leavenworth. In 1897, the pope moved several more counties from Leavenworth to Concordia. By the time of Fink's death in 1904, the Diocese of Leavenworth had 110 priests, 100 churches, 13 stations and chapels, 37 parochial schools, and 35,000 Catholics.

The second bishop of Leavenworth was Monsignor Thomas Lillis from Kansas City, Missouri, named by Pope Saint Pius X in 1904. During his tenure, Lillis established several new congregations, churches, and parochial schools. In 1910, he became coadjutor bishop of the Diocese of Kansas City (the future Diocese of Kansas City–Saint Joseph in Missouri).

To replace Lillis, Pius X in 1910 named John Ward of Leavenworth as bishop of that diocese. In 1927, Francis Johannes from the Diocese of St. Joseph was appointed coadjutor bishop in Leavenworth by Pope Pius XI to assist Ward. When Ward died in 1929, Johannes automatically succeeded him as bishop of Leavenworth. Johannes died in 1937. To replace Johannes in Leavenworth, Pius XI named Paul Schulte. In 1946, Schulte became archbishop of the Archdiocese of Indianapolis. Pope Pius XII then selected Auxiliary Bishop George Donnelly from the Archdiocese of St. Louis as the next bishop of Leavenworth.

=== 1947 to 1969 ===
On May 10, 1947, in recognition of the growth of Kansas City, Kansas, Pope Pius XII renamed the Diocese of Leavenworth as the Diocese of Kansas City in Kansas, with Donnelly remaining as bishop. Donnelly died in 1950. Pius XII then replaced him with Bishop Edward Hunkeler from the Diocese of Grand Island in 1951.

On August 9, 1952, Pius XII elevated the Diocese of Kansas City in Kansas to the Archdiocese of Kansas City in Kansas. The new archdiocese was assigned the suffragan dioceses of Dodge City, Salina (formerly the Diocese of Concordia) and Wichita. Hunkeler was named archbishop of Kansas City in Kansas. Hunkeler retired in 1969 due to health problems.

=== 1969 to 2004 ===
The second archbishop of Kansas City in Kansas was Bishop Ignatius Strecker from the Diocese of Springfield-Cape Girardeau, appointed by Pope Saint Paul VI in 1969. In 1990, Strecker established background and reference checks for all persons working with children, including employees and volunteers, at the archdiocese as part of a policy to combat sexual abuse of minors. In 1992, Strecker denounced the pro-choice views of State Representative Kathleen Sebelius. He accused Sebelius, a Catholic, of leading "the death-march of the unborn to the abortion clinics in the [Kansas] House of Representatives" and "attempting to make the 'death-marches' to the abortion clinics as legal as the death-marches to the gas chambers of the World War II Holocaust." Strecker retired in 1993.

Pope Saint John Paul II named Bishop James Keleher of the Diocese of Belleville as archbishop of Kansas City in Kansas in 1993. In 1996, Keleher started an education program to fight child sexual abuse in the archdiocese and instituted a background questionnaire for anyone working with children. In 2003, he instituted VIRTUS, a national child abuse prevention program.

=== 2004 to present ===
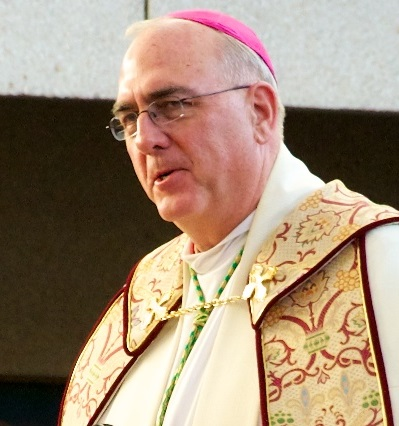
Archbishop Joseph Fred Naumann (pictured in 2011)

In January 2004, John Paul II appointed Auxiliary Bishop Joseph Naumann of St. Louis to serve as coadjutor archbishop for Keleher. In February 2004, Keleher requested that the parishes and Catholic institutions within the archdiocese stop inviting politicians who support abortion rights for women to any events. This request was precipitated by the University of St. Mary in Leavenworth inviting Sebelius to speak there. After Keleher resigned in 2005, his successor, Joseph Naumann, attempted to persuade Sebelius to change her stance on abortion rights; when she refused, he denied her communion.

The archdiocese in 2022 spent $2.45 million in support of a proposed amendment to the Kansas constitution to forbid abortion, which was eventually defeated by a 59 to 41% margin.

A priest of the archdiocese, Fr Arul Carasala, dean of the Nemaha-Marshall region, was shot and killed at his home in Seneca on 3 April 2025.

Pope Francis named Bishop W. Shawn McKnight of Jefferson City as the archbishop of Kansas City in Kansas on April 8, 2025.

=== Reports of sex abuse ===
In February 2019, it was announced that the Kansas Bureau of Investigation (KBI) had been investigating sex abuse allegations against the Kansas dioceses since November 2018. On August 14, 2020, Melissa Underwood, spokeswoman for the KBI, stated in an email “As of Aug. 7, we have had 205 reports of abuse and have opened 120 cases.”

== Bishops ==
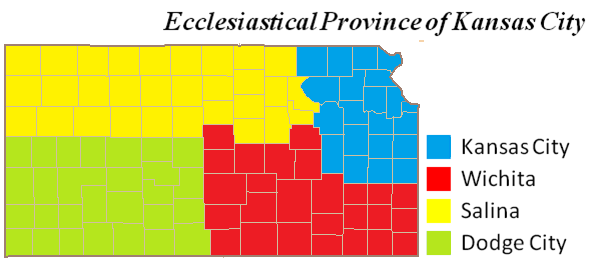
Ecclesiastical Province of Kansas City

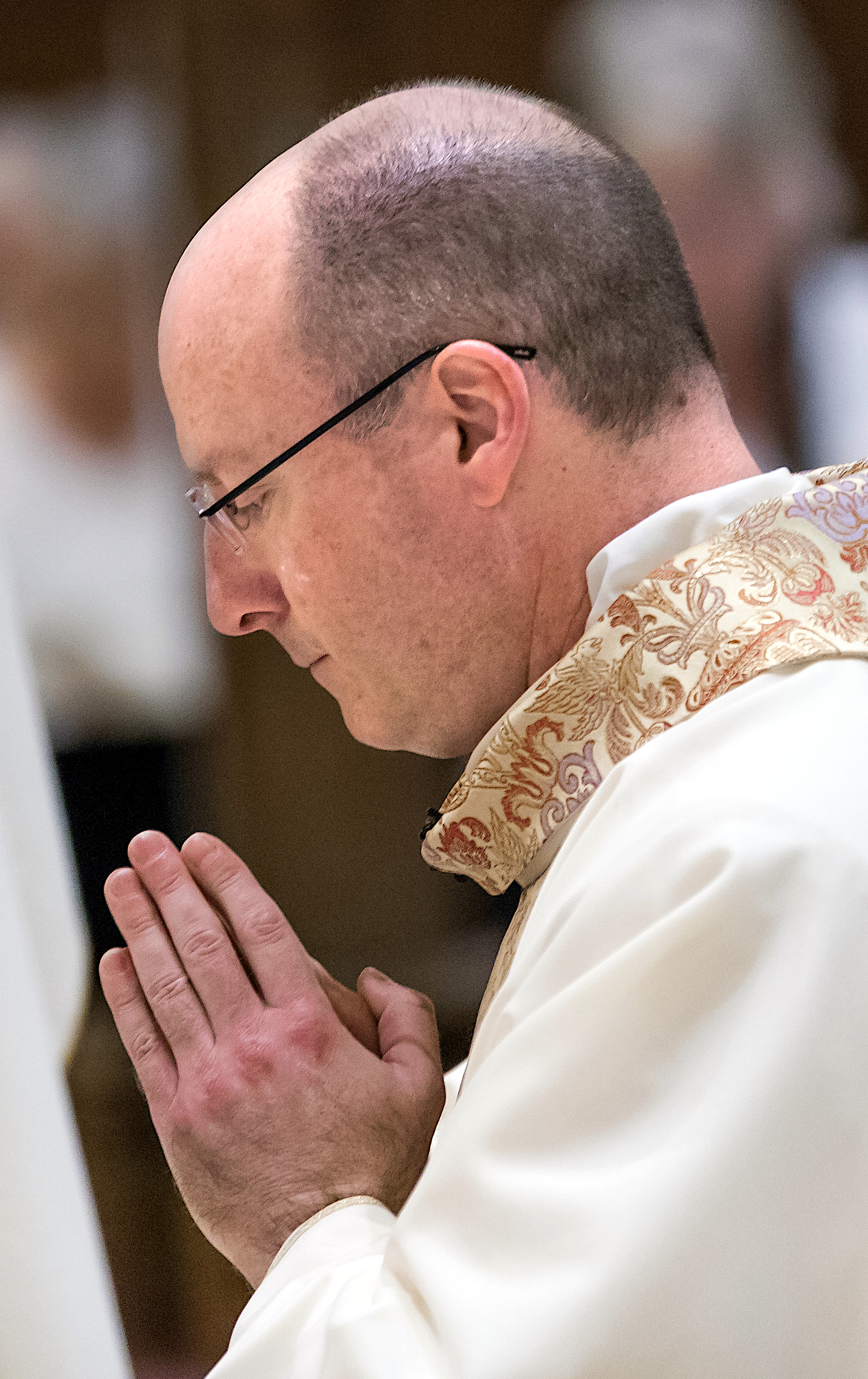
William Shawn McKnight (pictured in 2018) has served as Archbishop of Kansas City in Kansas since 2025.

=== Apostolic Vicar of Indian Territory East of the Rocky Mountains ===
John Baptiste Miège (1850–1857), title changed with title of apostolic vicariate

=== Apostolic Vicars of Kansas ===
1. John Baptiste Miège (1857–1874)
2. Louis Mary Fink (1874–1877), title changed with elevation to diocese

=== Bishops of Leavenworth ===
1. Louis Mary Fink (1877–1904)
2. Thomas Francis Lillis (1904–1910), appointed Coadjutor Bishop of Kansas City in Missouri and subsequently succeeded to that see
3. John Chamberlain Ward (1910–1929)
4. Francis Johannes (1929–1937)
5. Paul Clarence Schulte (1937–1946), appointed Archbishop of Indianapolis
6. George Joseph Donnelly (1946–1947), title changed with title of diocese

=== Bishops of Kansas City in Kansas ===
1. George Joseph Donnelly (1947–1950)
2. Edward Joseph Hunkeler (1951–1952), elevated to Archbishop

=== Metropolitan Archbishops of Kansas City in Kansas ===
1. Edward Joseph Hunkeler (1952–1969)
2. Ignatius Jerome Strecker (1969–1993)
3. James Patrick Keleher (1993–2005)
4. Joseph Fred Naumann (2005–2025)
5. William Shawn McKnight (2025–present)

=== Other diocesan priests who became bishops ===
- James O'Reilly, appointed Bishop of Leavenworth in 1887 (because of his death, did not take effect)
- John Francis Cunningham, appointed Bishop of Concordia in 1898

== Education ==
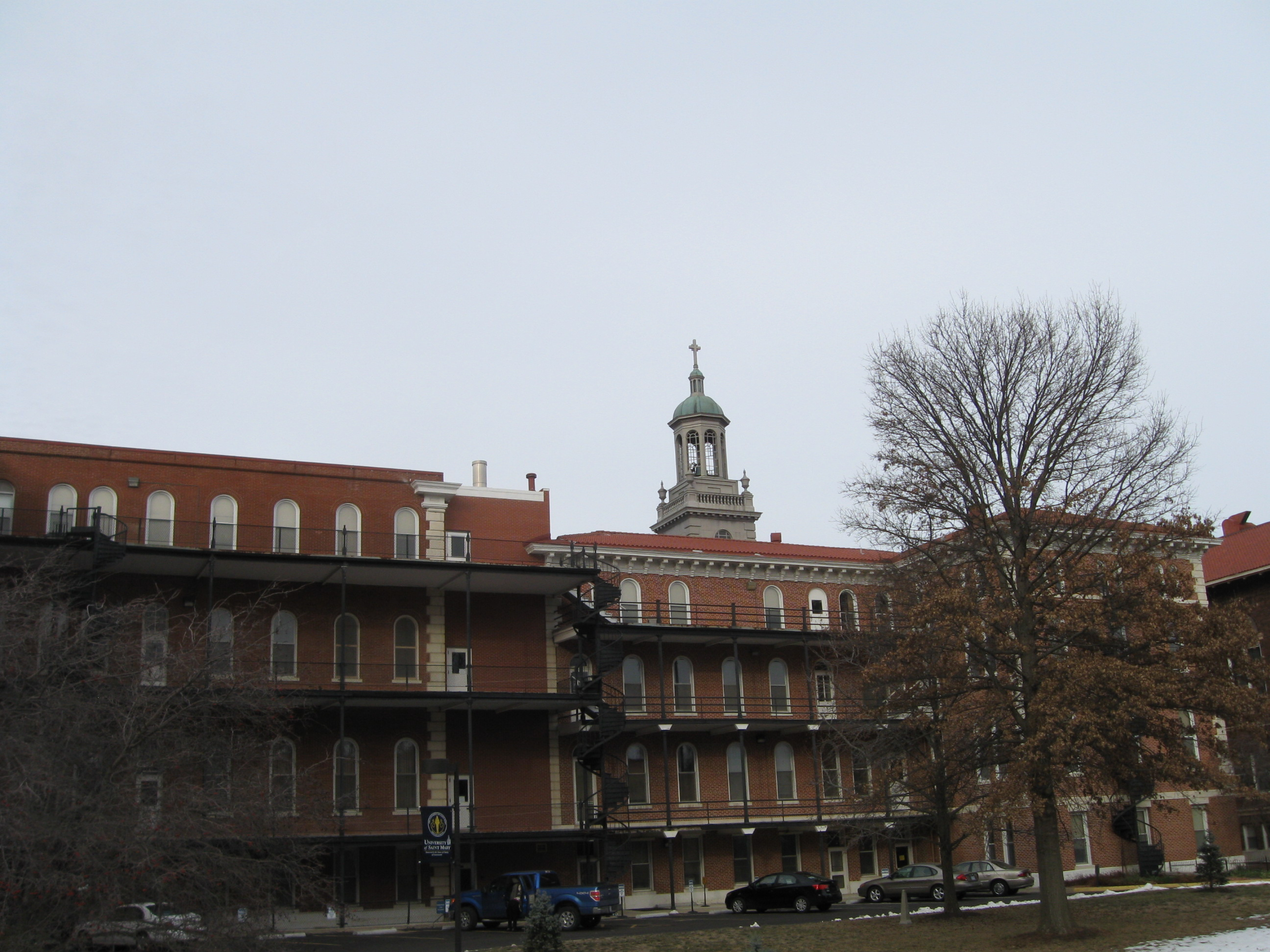
St. Mary's University, Kansas City, Kansas (2012)

=== High schools ===
- Bishop Miege High School – Roeland Park
- Bishop Ward High School – Kansas City
- Hayden High School – Topeka
- Immaculata High School – Leavenworth - closed 2017
- Maur Hill – Mount Academy* – Atchison (until 2003, Maur Hill was all boys and Mount Academy was all girls)
- St. James Academy – Lenexa
- Saint Thomas Aquinas High School – Overland Park

* Primary sponsorship comes from Saint Benedict's Abbey and Mount St. Scholastica Monastery.
