= Roman Catholic Diocese of Leavenworth =

Titular see and former Catholic diocese

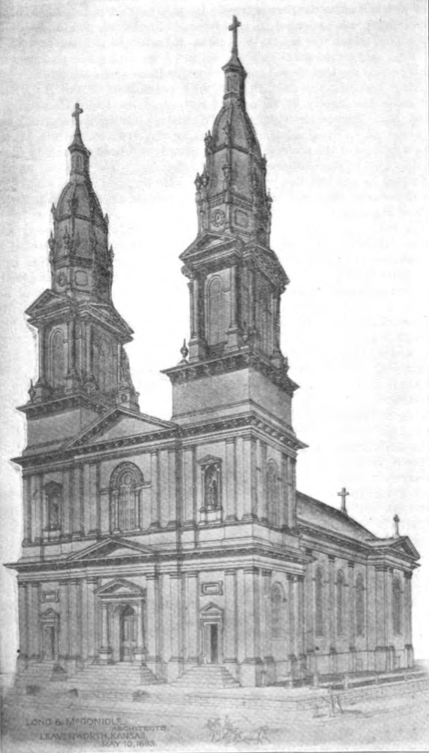
Catholic church, Leavenworth, Kansas, USA

The Diocese of Leavenworth (Latin: Dioecesis Leavenworthensis) was a Latin Church former diocese and present titular see originally in and around Kansas, in the midwestern United States.

== History ==
- The future diocese was created on 19 July 1850 as Apostolic Vicariate of Indian Territory East of the Rocky Mountains, by Pope Pius IX.
- On 6 January 1857, it lost territory to establish the then Apostolic Vicariate of Nebraska, and the remainder was renamed as Apostolic Vicariate of Kansas.
- On 22 May 1877, it was promoted as Diocese of Leavenworth, ceasing to be missionary and exempt.
- On 2 August 1887, it lost territories to establish the Dioceses of Wichita and the Concordia.
- On 29 May 1891, it was renamed as Diocese of Kansas City, Kansas / Civitatis Kansas (Latin).
- On 5 March 1897, it was finally renamed as Diocese of Leavenworth.
- On May 10, 1947, the diocese was suppressed and its territory used to establish the then Diocese of Kansas City in Kansas.

=== Ordinaries ===
Apostolic Vicar of Indian Territory East of the Rocky Mountains

- John Baptiste Miège, Jesuits (S.J.) (born France) (1850.07.23 – 1857 see below), Titular Bishop of Messene (1850.07.23 – death 1884.07.21)

Apostolic Vicars of Kansas

- John Baptiste Miège, Jesuits (S.J.) (see above 1857 – retired 1874.11.18), died 1884
- Louis Mary Fink, Benedictine Order (O.S.B.) (born Germany) (1874.11.18 – 1877.05.22 see below), Titular Bishop of Eucarpia (1871.03.01 – 1877.05.22), succeeding as former Coadjutor Vicar Apostolic of Kansas (1871.03.01 – 1874.11.18)

Suffragan Bishop of Leavenworth (first time)

- Louis Mary Fink, (O.S.B.) (see above 1877.05.22 – 1891.05.29 see below)

Suffragan Bishop of Kansas City, Kansas

- Louis Mary Fink, (O.S.B.) (see above 1891.05.29 – 1897.03.05 see below)

Suffragan Bishops of Leavenworth (again)

- Louis Mary Fink, (O.S.B.) (see above 1897.03.05 – 1904.03.17 death)
- Thomas Francis Lillis (first native incumbent) (1904.10.24 – 1910.03.14), later Titular Bishop of Cibyra Magna (1910.03.14 – 1913.02.21), Coadjutor Bishop (1910.03.14 – 1913.02.21) and next Bishop of Kansas City (USA) (1913.02.21 – death 1938.12.29)
- John Chamberlain Ward (1910.11.25 – 1929.04.20)
- Francis Johannes (1929.04.20 – 1937.03.13), previously Titular Bishop of Thasus & Coadjutor Bishop of Leavenworth (1927.12.19 – death 1929.04.20)
- Paul Clarence Schulte (1937.05.29 – 1946.07.20); later Metropolitan Archbishop of Indianapolis (1946.07.20 – retired 1970.01.03) and emeritate as Titular Archbishop of Elicroca (1970.01.03 – death 1984.02.17)
- George Joseph Donnelly (1946.11.09 – 1947.05.10), previously Titular Bishop of Cœla & Auxiliary Bishop of Saint Louis (USA) (1940.03.19 – 1946.11.09); later first Bishop of successor diocese Kansas City (1947.05.10 – death 1950.12.13) (now Archdiocese of Kansas City in Kansas)

== Titular see ==
In 1995, the Diocese was nominally restored as a Latin rite titular bishopric of Leavenworth.

It has had the following incumbents, so far of the fitting Episcopal (lowest) rank:

- Marion Francis Forst (1995.09.23 – death 2007.06.02) as emeritate; previously Bishop of Dodge City (USA) (1960.01.02 – 1976.10.16), Titular Bishop of Scala (1976.10.16 – 1986.12.23) as Auxiliary Bishop of Archdiocese of Kansas City (USA) (1976.10.16 – 1986.12.23)
- Barry Christopher Knestout (2008.11.18 – 2018.01.12) as Auxiliary Bishop of Washington (D.C., USA); next Bishop of Richmond (USA) (2017.12.05 – ...)
- Joel M. Konzen, S.M. (2018.04.03 – ...), Auxiliary Bishop of Atlanta, USA.

== See also ==
- List of Catholic dioceses in the United States

== Sources and external links ==
- GCatholic - data for all sections, with incumbent biography links and Google satellite HQ photo
