= List of bishops of St. Louis =

Bishops of the Archdiocese of St. Louis

The following is the list of bishops of the Archdiocese of St. Louis. The Roman Catholic Church in the United States comprises 195 dioceses led by diocesan bishops. Auxiliary bishops serve in association with the diocesan bishops in larger dioceses. There are thirty-two ecclesiastical provinces, each headed by a metropolitan archbishop, of which the Archbishop of Saint Louis is one. As of November 2010, five of the metropolitan archbishops of this see have been designated cardinals: John Joseph Glennon (1946), Joseph Ritter (1961), John Carberry (1969) Justin Francis Rigali (2003; as archbishop of Philadelphia), and Raymond Leo Burke (2010; as prefect of the Supreme Tribunal of the Apostolic Signatura).

In addition to the 195 dioceses, there are several other dioceses in the nation's overseas dependencies. There are also dioceses and eparchies of the Eastern Catholic Churches. A special archdiocese was created by the Vatican for the United States military. Such bodies are also organized into metropolitan provinces of their own.

All bishops in the United States and the U.S. Virgin Islands, diocesan and auxiliary, are members of the United States Conference of Catholic Bishops. Bishops in Puerto Rico form their own Episcopal Conference. Those from insular areas in the Pacific Ocean are members of the Episcopal Conference of the Pacific.

== St. Louis archdiocesan hierarchy ==
=== Archbishops ===
- Joseph Rosati, C.M.: March 20, 1827 – September 25, 1843
- Peter Richard Kenrick: September 25, 1843 – May 21, 1895
- John Joseph Kain: May 21, 1895 – October 13, 1903
- John Joseph Glennon: October 13, 1903 – March 9, 1946
- Joseph Ritter: July 20, 1946 – June 10, 1967
- John Carberry: March 25, 1968 – July 31, 1979
- John Lawrence May: January 24, 1980 – December 2, 1992
- Justin Francis Rigali: March 16, 1994 – July 15, 2003
- Raymond Leo Burke: January 26, 2004 – June 27, 2008
- Robert James Carlson: April 21, 2009 – June 10, 2020
- Mitchell Thomas Rozanski: June 10, 2020 – Present

==== Succession chart ====
New diocese	Joseph Rosati; 1827–1843	Succeeded by Peter Richard Kenrick
Preceded by Joseph Rosati	Peter Richard Kenrick; 1843–1895	Succeeded by John Joseph Kain
Preceded by Peter Richard Kenrick	John Joseph Kain; 1895–1903	Succeeded by John Joseph Glennon
Preceded by John Joseph Kain	John Joseph Glennon; 1903–1946	Succeeded by Joseph Elmer Ritter
Preceded by John Joseph Glennon	Joseph Elmer Ritter; 1946–1967	Succeeded by John Joseph Carberry
Preceded by Joseph Elmer Ritter	John Joseph Carberry; 1968–1979	Succeeded by John Lawrence May
Preceded by John Joseph Carberry	John Lawrence May; 1980–1992	Succeeded by Justin Francis Rigali
Preceded by John Lawrence May	Justin Francis Rigali; 1994–2003	Succeeded by Raymond Leo Burke
Preceded by Justin Francis Rigali	Raymond Leo Burke; 2004-2008	Vacant
Preceded by Raymond Leo Burke	sede vacante 2008–2009	Succeeded by Robert James Carlson
Vacant	Robert James Carlson; 2009–2020	Succeeded by Mitchell Thomas Rozanski

=== Auxiliary Bishops ===
- Christian Herman Winkelmann: September 13, 1933 – December 27, 1939
- George Joseph Donnelly: March 19, 1940 – November 9, 1946
- John Cody: May 10, 1947 – January 27, 1954
- Charles Herman Helmsing: March 17, 1949 – August 24, 1956
- Leo Christopher Byrne: May 21, 1954 – February 11, 1961
- Glennon Patrick Flavin: April 17, 1957 – May 29, 1967
- George Joseph Gottwald: June 23, 1961 – August 2, 1988
- Joseph Alphonse McNicholas: January 31, 1969 – July 22, 1975
- Charles Roman Koester: January 2, 1971 – September 10, 1991
- Edward Thomas O'Meara: January 28, 1972 – November 21, 1979
- John Nicholas Wurm: June 25, 1976 – September 19, 1981
- Edward Joseph O'Donnell: December 6, 1983 – November 8, 1994
- James Terry Steib, S.V.D.: December 6, 1983 – May 5, 1993
- Paul Albert Zipfel: May 16, 1989 – December 31, 1996
- Edward Kenneth Braxton: May 17, 1995 – February 21, 2001
- Michael John Sheridan: July 8, 1997 – December 4, 2001
- Joseph Fred Naumann: July 8, 1997 – January 7, 2004
- Timothy Michael Dolan: June 19, 2001 – June 25, 2002
- Robert Joseph Hermann: October 16, 2002 – December 1, 2010
- Edward Matthew Rice: December 1, 2010 – April 26, 2016
- Mark Steven Rivituso: March 7, 2017 – Present

== See also ==
- Roman Catholic Archdiocese of St. Louis
- List of the Catholic bishops of the United States
- List of the Catholic cathedrals of the United States
- List of the Roman Catholic dioceses of the United States
