= Marion Francis Forst =

American Catholic bishop (1910–2007)

His Excellency, The Most Reverend Marion Francis Forst
- Auxiliary Bishop of Kansas City; Titular Bishop of Leavenworth
- Church: Roman Catholic Church
- See: Kansas City, Kansas
- In office: 1995–2007
- Previous posts: Bishop of Dodge City (1960 to 1976)

Orders
- Ordination: June 10, 1934 by John J. Glennon
- Consecration: March 24, 1960, by Charles Helmsing

Personal details
- Born: September 3, 1910 St. Louis, Missouri, US
- Died: June 2, 2007 (aged 96) Olathe, Kansas, US
- Education: Kenrick Seminary
- Motto: In deo confido (I trust in God)

Marion Francis Forst (September 3, 1910 – June 2, 2007) was an American prelate of the Roman Catholic Church. He served as bishop of the Diocese of Dodge City in Kansas from 1960 to 1976, then as an auxiliary bishop of the Archdiocese of Kansas City in Kansas from 1976 to 1986.

== Biography ==
=== Early life ===
One of eight children, Marion Forst was born on September 3, 1910, in St. Louis, Missouri, to Frank and Bertha (née Gulath) Forst. An uncle and two brothers were also priests. He learned to serve as an altar boy in the first grade, and by the time he was in fourth grade he was teaching other boys how to serve. He studied at Kenrick Seminary in Shrewsbury, Missouri.

=== Priesthood ===
Forst was ordained to the priesthood for the Archdiocese of Saint Louis by Archbishop John J. Glennon in Webster Groves, Missouri, on June 10, 1934. After his ordination, the archdiocese sent him to Denver, Colorado, for two years to serve as a curate at Blessed Sacrament Church. He returned to Missouri in 1936 to serve at Queen of Peace Parish in Glendale. Forst was then assigned as a curate at St. Theresa Parish in St. Louis, Missouri, in 1943.

After the entry of the United States into World War II in 1941, Forst enlisted in the US Navy Chaplain Corps. After his discharge from the Navy in 1946, Forst was appointed pastor of St. Mary's Parish in Cape Girardeau, Missouri. When Pope Pius XII erected the Diocese of Springfield-Cape Girardeau in 1956, Forst was incardinated, or transferred, into the new diocese. Bishop Charles Helmsing appointed Forst as his vicar general.

=== Bishop of Dodge City ===
On January 2, 1960, Forst was appointed as second bishop of Dodge City by Pope John XXIII. He received his episcopal consecration at the Cathedral of St. Mary of the Annunciation in Cape Girardeau on March 24, 1960, from Helmsing. Bishops Mark Kenny Carroll and Leo Christopher Byrne served as co-consecrators.

Between 1962 and 1965, Forst attended all four sessions of the Second Vatican Council in Rome. He later described it as "the paramount event of all [his] episcopal years...[and] the best thing that happened to the church in the 20th century." During his tenure, Forst established several new offices and ministries in the diocese, including Catholic Social Service, the Office of Religious Education, Family Life Office, Religious Education for the Handicapped, the Southwest Kansas Register diocesan newspaper, Office of Mexican American Affairs, and the Youth/Young Adults Office. He opposed the denial of federal aid to private schools, which he believed was "a smoke screen" designed "to get rid of these schools."

=== Auxiliary Bishop of Kansas City ===
After sixteen years as bishop Dodge City, Forst submitted his resignation due to poor health to the Vatican on October 16, 1976. Pope Paul VI named him as the auxiliary bishop of Kansas City in Kansas and titular bishop of Leavenworth that same day. Forst remained in this capacity for ten years, resigning both posts on December 23, 1986.

=== Death and legacy ===
Forst died on June 2, 2007 at Olathe Medical Center in Olathe, Kansas, at age 96. At the time of his death, he was the oldest Catholic bishop in the United States.

Catholic Church titles
Preceded by –	Auxiliary Bishop of Kansas City in Kansas; 1976–1986	Succeeded by –
Preceded by John Baptist Franz	Bishop of Dodge City; 1960–1976	Succeeded by Eugene John Gerber
