= Leo John Steck =

Most Reverend Leo J. Steck
- Auxiliary Bishop of Salt Lake City
- Church: Catholic Church
- See: Titular See of Ilium
- Appointed: March 13, 1948
- In office: May 20, 1948 - June 19, 1950

Orders
- Ordination: June 8, 1924
- Consecration: May 20, 1948 by Joseph Ritter

Personal details
- Born: August 30, 1898 St. Louis, Missouri, US
- Died: June 19, 1950 (aged 51) St. Louis, Missouri, US

Leo John Steck (August 30, 1898 – June 19, 1950) was a bishop of the Catholic Church in the United States. He served as auxiliary bishop of the Diocese of Salt Lake City from 1948 to 1950.

== Biography ==
Born in St. Louis, Missouri, Leo Steck studied for the priesthood at Kenrick Seminary and was ordained a priest on June 8, 1924, for the Archdiocese of St. Louis. He was engaged in pastoral work as a priest and served as the director of the Catholic Rural Life Conference. On March 13, 1948 Pope Pius XII appointed him as the Titular Bishop of Ilium and Auxiliary Bishop of Salt Lake City. He was consecrated a bishop by Archbishop Joseph Ritter of St. Louis on May 20, 1948. The principal co-consecrators were Bishops Mark Carroll of Wichita and Auxiliary Bishop John Cody of St. Louis.

Steck established the Newman Center at the University of Utah. He also wrote a leaflet, A Foreign Mission Close to Home, that appealed for financial support for the Salt Lake diocese The Mormons misunderstood its intent a considered it a call for the conversion of the members of the Church of Jesus Christ of Latter-day Saints. Salt Lake's bishop, Duane G. Hunt, had to reassure the Mormons of their true intent. Bishop Steck had health problems and when he was in his native Missouri suffered a stroke. He died at a St. Louis hospital on June 19, 1950, at the age of 51.

Catholic Church titles
Preceded by –	Auxiliary Bishop of Salt Lake City; 1948–1950	Succeeded by –
