= Eugene John Gerber =

American Catholic prelate (1931–2018)

His Excellency, The Most Reverend Eugene John Gerber
- Bishop of Wichita
- Church: Catholic; Latin Church
- Diocese: Wichita
- Appointed: November 17, 1982
- Installed: February 9, 1983
- Term ended: October 4, 2001
- Predecessor: David M. Maloney
- Successor: Thomas J. Olmsted
- Previous post: Bishop of Dodge City (1976‍–‍1982)

Orders
- Ordination: May 19, 1959 by Mark K. Carroll
- Consecration: December 14, 1976 by David M. Maloney, Marion Francis Forst, and Richard Charles Patrick Hanifen

Personal details
- Born: April 30, 1931 Kingman, Kansas, U.S.
- Died: September 29, 2018 (aged 87) Wichita, Kansas, U.S.
- Education: St. Thomas Seminary College; Catholic University of America; Wichita State University; Pontifical University of Saint Thomas Aquinas
- Motto: God with us

Styles of Eugene John Gerber
- Reference style: His Excellency; The Most Reverend
- Spoken style: Your Excellency
- Religious style: Bishop

Ordination history of Eugene John Gerber
History
Priestly ordination
- Ordained by: Mark Kenny Carroll
Episcopal consecration
- Consecrated by: David M. Maloney
Episcopal succession
Bishops consecrated by Eugene John Gerber as principal consecrator
- Thomas J. Olmsted: April 20, 1999

Eugene John Gerber (April 30, 1931 – September 29, 2018) was an American prelate of the Catholic Church. He served as bishop of the Diocese of Dodge City in Kansas from 1976 to 1982, and bishop of the Diocese of Wichita in Kansas from 1982 to 2001.

== Biography ==
=== Early life ===
Eugene Gerber was born on April 30, 1931, in Kingman, to Cornelius and Lena (née Tiesmeyer) Gerber. The fourth of seven children, he had two brothers, Jerome and Larry, and four sisters, Kathleen, Helen, Leola, and Joan. At his baptism on May 1, 1931, the officiating priest predicted to Gerber's father, "Some day this boy will become a priest!"

Gerber was raised on a farm in Waterloo, Kansas, and entered Immaculate Conception Seminary in Conception, Missouri, in 1945. Two years later, he transferred to Kingman High School, where he was known as a Frank Sinatra look-alike, and graduated in 1949.

Gerber studied accounting at Wichita State University before returning to Immaculate Conception Seminary. In May 1955, he graduated from St. Thomas Aquinas Seminary in Denver, Colorado. He obtained a Bachelor of Arts degree in philosophy (1955), a Master of Religious Education degree (1958), and a Bachelor of Sacred Theology degree through the seminary's affiliation with the Catholic University of America in Washington, D.C. Gerber became a subdeacon and later a deacon in 1958.

=== Priesthood ===
Gerber was ordained to the priesthood at St. Patrick's Church in Kingman for the Diocese of Wichita by Mark Carroll on May 19, 1959. After his ordination, Gerber served as an associate pastor at St. Anne and Church of the Parishes in Wichita. In 1962, he became an instructor at Notre Dame High School in Wichita, teaching algebra and religion, and working as a guidance counselor. He also served as moderator of the Catholic Youth Organization.

In May 1963, Gerber was named assistant chancellor for the diocese and associate pastor of Holy Savior Parish. He also earned a Bachelor of Education degree from Wichita State University in Wichita in June 1963. In addition to his role as assistant chancellor, Gerber became secretary to Bishop Leo Bryne and associate pastor of St. Thomas Aquinas Parish in 1964. He was appointed vice chancellor of the diocese (1965), business manager of the diocesan newspaper (1967), and associate pastor at St. Mary Cathedral (1968).

In 1969, Gerber was appointed to the governing board of the Holy Family Center for the developmentally disabled. He became diocesan director of the Cursillo movement in 1970, and chancellor in 1973. Continuing as chancellor, Gerber served as pastor of Blessed Sacrament Parish in Wichita from 1973 to 1975.

In October 1975, Gerber was sent to Rome to undertake his postgraduate studies in theology and scripture. He received a Licentiate of Sacred Theology summa cum laude from the Pontifical University of Saint Thomas Aquinas. Upon his return to the Kansas in February 1976, Gerber resumed his work as chancellor and was appointed chaplain to the Sisters of St. Joseph and vicar for religious.

=== Bishop of Dodge City ===
On October 16, 1976, Gerber was appointed the third bishop of Dodge City by Pope Paul VI. He received his episcopal consecration at the Cathedral of the Immaculate Conception in Wichita on December 14, 1976, from Bishop David Maloney, with Bishops Marion Forst and Richard Hanifen serving as co-consecrators. After Ignatius J. Strecker, Gerber was the second native of the Diocese of Wichita to be appointed bishop.

Gerber was formally installed as bishop on December 15, 1976, at the Dodge City Civic Center. He served on the National Conference of Catholic Bishops (NCCB) Ad Hoc Committee on Parish Renewal for four years.

=== Bishop of Wichita ===
Gerber was later named the sixth bishop of Wichita by Pope John Paul II on November 17, 1982. Within the next twenty days, both of his parents died. Gerber was installed on February 9, 1983.

During his tenure, he served on the NCCB Ad Hoc Committee for Parish Renewal; the NCCB Committee on the Permanent Diaconate; two terms on the Administrative Board of the National Conference of Catholic Bishops, representing Region IX; on the NCCB Liaison Committee with the Leadership Conference of Women Religious (LCWR); the Communications Committee; the Pastoral Research and Practices Committee; the Liaison Committee with NC News; the NCCB Pro-Life Committee; Committee for Women in Society and the Church; and the Ad Hoc Committee on Stewardship.

Locally, Gerber served as a board member for the Wichita chapter of the Urban League, Via Christi Health Systems, HopeNet, Kansas Foodbank Warehouse, Inc., and Wichita Grand Opera. He received Thomas J. Olmsted as a coadjutor bishop in April 1999.

=== Retirement and legacy ===
John Paul II accepted Gerber's resignation as bishop of Wichita on October 4, 2001. He then served as a chaplain to the Discalced Carmelite Sisters and as a spiritual director for priests. Eugene Gerber died at age 87 at a Wichita hospital on September 29, 2018, after suffering a heart attack while driving earlier in the day.

== See also ==
- Catholic Church in the United States
- Hierarchy of the Catholic Church
- Historical list of the Catholic bishops of the United States
- List of Catholic bishops in the United States
- Lists of popes, patriarchs, primates, archbishops, and bishops

Catholic Church titles
Preceded by David Monas Maloney	Bishop of Wichita; 1982–2001	Succeeded by Thomas J. Olmsted
Preceded by Marion Francis Forst	Bishop of Dodge City; 1976–1982	Succeeded by Stanley Girard Schlarman
