= St. Stanislaus Kostka Church (St. Louis, Missouri) =

Historic church in Missouri, United States

- U.S. National Register of Historic Places
- St. Louis Landmark
- Eastern exterior front of the church in 2020
- Location: 1413 North 20th Street, St. Louis, Missouri
- Coordinates: 38.64228°N 90.20575°W
- Built: 1891
- Architect: Wessbecher & Hummel
- Website: St. Stanislaus Parish
- NRHP reference No.: 79003635
- Added to NRHP: July 10, 1979

St. Stanislaus Kostka Church is an independent Catholic church located in the city of St. Louis, Missouri. Formerly a parish belonging to the Catholic Church, it was established in 1880 to serve the Polish community in the Archdiocese of St. Louis. The parish is maintained and managed by its parishioners as a 501(c)3 not-for-profit corporation.

The church building itself has been called one of the best examples of the opulent Polish Cathedral style of architecture west of the Mississippi River.

The church is notable for a highly publicized dispute between the church's lay board of directors and the Archdiocese of St. Louis. The Archdiocese and the board had been involved in a protracted dispute regarding control of the parish and its assets dating to the early 20th century, which came to a head in 2004, when the board feared that the Archdiocese (then under the leadership of Raymond Leo Burke) would attempt to close and sell the parish. The legal dispute culminated in a 2013 agreement whereby St. Stanislaus Kostka Church became an independent church unaffiliated with the Archdiocese and the Catholic Church at large.

== Church history ==
In 1878, the Archdiocese of St. Louis authorized the construction of a parish to serve the city's growing Polish Catholic community, which up until then attended St. Patrick's at Sixth and Biddle Streets. In 1880, construction began on St. Stanislaus Kostka. The church was built just north of Downtown St. Louis, in a neighborhood that was home to a large number of Polish immigrants. The original church building was built in Romanesque Revival style. It was originally administered by the Franciscans and was the mother church for three other Polish parishes-St. Casimir (1889), St. Hedwig (1904) and Our Lady of Czestochowa (1907).

Under a land deed signed by Archbishop Peter Kenrick in 1891, the parish property was assigned to a corporation under a pastor and lay board members to be continually appointed by the archbishop. The founding documents are known collectively as the Deed and Charter & Bylaws of 1891. A new larger edifice, designed by Wessbecher and Hummel, was dedicated in September 1892.

In 1928, the church was damaged by a fire that destroyed the center dome of the structure, and almost all of the original interior decoration. The dome was not rebuilt. In 1969, Cardinal Karol Wojtyla, Archbishop of Kraków (later Pope John Paul II), visited the church. The building was listed as a City Landmark in 1976 and added to the National Register of Historic Places in 1979. The church is located on the outskirts of the former site of the infamous Pruitt–Igoe housing complex.

The church continued to serve the Polish Catholic community in St. Louis even as the community dispersed from the surrounding neighborhood. By the 1950s it had lost most of its local parishioners, but continued to receive ethnic support. By the 1970s, the parish buildings were severely deteriorating. The parishioners undertook a large-scale restoration of the church building and began acquiring land surrounding the church. Later improvements included the construction of a Polish Heritage Center. By 2005, the church assets included 8 acres (32,000 m^{2}) of land, and the board of trustees estimated the total value of the parish assets at $9.5 million.

== Conflict with archdiocese ==
The controversy, involving both the control of the physical and financial assets of the parish and the administrative authority of the archbishop, focused on whether those assets would be controlled by a pastor appointed by the archbishop, which is the current canonical norm in the United States, or by a lay board of directors, a practice known as trusteeism. The controversy began under Cardinal John J. Glennon and continued under the late Cardinal Joseph Ritter and his successors, Archbishop John May, Cardinal Justin Rigali, and Archbishop Raymond Leo Burke. Archbishop Robert James Carlson endeavored to find an adequate compromise that would satisfy canon law and all concerned parties, but the breakaway members rejected his proposal.

The current structure of the parish derives from one created in 1891. The parish board took the position that the purpose of Burke's actions was to take control of the assets of the parish primarily for economic reasons. Members noted that the parish had sustained and restored itself without financial assistance from the Archdiocese and claimed that Burke intended to close the parish once he had control of it.

The archdiocese, as a rebuttal, alleged that the lay board of directors, in the early 1980s, without permission from then-Archbishop May, changed the original 1891 bylaws, which stipulated that the lay board was to function solely as an advisory body to the pastor and thus under the archbishop (cf. the Plenary Councils of Baltimore). In the bylaws as amended, the authority of the pastor was revoked, putting the lay board in full control of the parish. In response, not long after his appointment, Burke demanded that the structure of the parish once again conform to current canon law norms for the United States. The lay board formally appealed to the Holy See, but that appeal was denied. The archdiocese did not dispute the fact that the deed to the church property itself belongs to the parish corporation and not to the archdiocese. What was disputed instead was the membership of that corporation, and how the members were to be chosen. In interpreting the bylaws on these questions, the District Court ruled against the archdiocese and affirmed St. Stanislaus' ownership of its property and its right to craft bylaws that limit the authority of the Roman Catholic archbishop.

In August 2004, Burke removed both priests from the parish and transferred the Polish ministry to St. John the Apostle and Evangelist Church, located across from St. Louis Union Station. When the priests left the parish, they took with them property of the parish, including the hymnals, missals, songbooks, and parish records. In January 2005 Burke threatened the members of the parish board of directors with an interdict if they did not comply with his instructions by February 4, 2005. On February 10, 2005, the lay board had not complied, and the archbishop issued an interdict against the board members, stating that they "knowingly, deliberately and publicly damaged seriously the unity of the Church."

As of February 25, 2005, Burke's reorganization plan for parishes in south St. Louis City permanently changed the personal parish for Polish Catholics in St. Louis to the nearby church of St. Agatha, a move to which was completed on July 1, 2005.

In December 2005, the lay board announced plans to hire a priest of the Diocese of Springfield-Cape Girardeau (in southern Missouri), the Rev. Marek B. Bozek, whose bishop, John Joseph Leibrecht, immediately suspended him for leaving his post without permission. In response to the action of the board, on December 16, 2005, Burke declared that Bozek and the lay board members, Dr. Joseph Rudawski, John Baras, William Bialczak, Edward Florek, Stanley Novak, and John Robert Zabielski, were guilty of the ecclesiastical crime, or delict, of schism from the Roman Catholic Church, an offense to which is automatically attached the penalty of excommunication. In a letter to Catholics in the Archdiocese, he warned the faithful that they would be risking grave sin if they knowingly attempted to receive sacraments from a priest who is in formal schism. Burke also announced his intention to suppress the parish. Following this announcement, a sizeable crowd attended the first Mass celebrated by the new pastor, on Christmas Eve 2005. On December 29, 2005, Burke canonically suppressed St. Stanislaus Kostka Parish, since it was operating independently of the Archdiocese of St. Louis.

On May 15, 2008, the Congregation for the Doctrine of the Faith issued a decree rejecting the recourse filed in March 2006 by the Rev. Bozek and the other excommunicated board members against the decrees of excommunication. This decision on the part of the Vatican ratified the excommunications on the basis of the commission of schism being "evident" on the part of the excommunicated board members.

In 2009, Pope Benedict XVI dismissed Bozek from the clerical state.

In June 2022, Bozek returned to Poland.

== Subsequent developments ==
Servers at Mass in the church in 2020

The Archdiocese of St. Louis issued the following statement on July 23, 2008:

Mrs. Bernice Krauze, Mr. Stanley Rozanski, and Mr. Robert Zabielski, members of the previous Board of Directors of Saint Stanislaus Parish Corporation, met last month (June 10) with Archbishop Raymond L. Burke to be reconciled fully with the Catholic Church. They are once again in full communion with the Roman Catholic Church and are no longer under any censure. Edward Florek was reconciled fully with the Roman Catholic Church in 2008 and is in full communion. He is no longer under any censure.

Since then, the three have joined other ex-parishioners of the former Saint Stanislaus Kostka parish in filing a lawsuit against the Saint Stanislaus Parish Corporation. The lawsuit is asking for the corporation to adhere to the 1891 Bylaws, to which the parish and the Archdiocese of St. Louis had agreed. If the lawsuit is successful, the Archdiocese of St. Louis is prepared to appoint a Catholic priest, Rev. Michael Marchlewski, S.J., to Saint Stanislaus as administrator.

In 2010 the archdiocese made an offer to settle the lawsuit. The offer would have left control of the property and assets in the congregation but brought the parish back under ecclesiastical control of the archdiocese. However, there was no guarantee the parish would not be closed in the future. The excommunicated priest, Marek Bozek, whose liberal views had become an issue to conservative Archbishop Burke, would have been required to depart. The settlement offer was rejected by a vote of 257 to 185.

Under Bozek's leadership, the church, in a decaying St. Louis neighborhood, grew by roughly 500 families, despite approximately 200 families leaving since the beginning of the dispute. Bozek's non-orthodox views include allowing priests to marry and permitting women and homosexuals to be ordained. Transformation of the issues from property to doctrinal concerns alienated some traditional parish members but attracted other new congregants.

On March 15, 2012, a St. Louis circuit court judge ruled that control of the church property and assets belonged to St. Stanislaus Parish Corporation, not the archdiocese. Judge Hettenbach wrote in a decision that sided with the parish on all but two of the case's 12 questions "The archbishop may own the souls of wayward St. Stanislaus parishioners, but the St. Stanislaus Parish Corporation owns its own property".

On February 13, 2013, St. Stanislaus Corporation and the Archdiocese of St. Louis issued a joint statement that said:

The Archdiocese of St. Louis and St. Stanislaus have resolved their legal dispute. The Archdiocese will dismiss its appeal and the judgment of the trial court is now final. St. Stanislaus has agreed that it will not hold itself out as affiliated in any way with the Archdiocese of St. Louis or the Roman Catholic Church. Neither side made any payments to the other as part of this resolution. All other terms of the resolution are confidential. By bringing this legal dispute to an end, we pray that this will help to initiate a process of healing.

In August 2013, Bishop Wayne Smith of the Episcopal Diocese of Missouri, announced that the diocese and St. Stanislaus had entered into preliminary discussions regarding St. Stanislaus joining the Episcopal Church (United States). It was reported to also be in discussions with the Polish National Catholic Church and other groups regarding possible affiliation.

On Friday, August 16, 2019, The Episcopal News Service released the following update in an article by Janis Greenbaum, Director of Communications for the Episcopal Diocese of Missouri.

Bishop Smith has notified the Diocesan Standing Committee, Bishop Mike Klusmeyer of West Virginia (liaison to the International Old Catholic Bishops’ Conference), and Presiding Bishop Michael Curry about this possible union. For the affiliation to be official, Bishop Smith would make an application to Presiding Bishop Curry on behalf of St. Stanislaus to request permission for the union. Whether St. Stanislaus officially affiliates with the diocese or not, the parish will be playing a major role in our near future by hosting the ordination and consecration of our 11th bishop [of the Episcopal Diocese of Missouri] on April 25, 2020. The Transition Committee chose their sacred space for the event because of its size, accessibility and inclusiveness to all. The church shares grounds with the Polish Heritage Center, which will host a celebration reception following the service.

On Friday, Aug. 16, 2019, The Episcopal News Service updated the article by Janis Greenbaum as follows.

After this story was published online, leaders from St. Stanislaus Kostka Polish Catholic Parish announced the congregation had decided not to officially join the Episcopal Diocese of Missouri, citing property rights as a key factor.

== See also ==
- Franciscan Sisters of Our Lady of Perpetual Help
- Polish Cathedral style churches
