= Glennonville, Missouri =

Unincorporated community in Dunklin County, Missouri

Coordinates: 36°34′51″N 90°09′20″W

Glennonville is an unincorporated community in Dunklin County, in the U.S. state of Missouri.

== History ==
Glennonville was originally built up chiefly by German Catholics. The community was named after John J. Glennon, the Archbishop of St. Louis. A post office called Glennonville was established in 1907, and remained in operation until 1941.
