= George Joseph Gottwald =

Catholic bishop

Most Reverend George J. Gottwald
- Auxiliary Bishop of St. Louis
- Church: Catholic Church
- See: Titular See of Cedamusa
- In office: August 8, 1961 - August 2, 1988

Orders
- Ordination: June 9, 1940
- Consecration: August 8, 1961 by Joseph Ritter

Personal details
- Born: May 12, 1914 St. Louis, Missouri
- Died: March 11, 2002 (aged 87) St. Louis, Missouri

George J. Gottwald (May 12, 1914 – March 11, 2002) was an American Bishop of the Catholic Church. He served as an auxiliary bishop of the Archdiocese of St. Louis from 1961 to 1988.

== Biography ==
Born in St. Louis, Missouri, George Joseph Gottwald was ordained a priest for the Archdiocese of St. Louis on June 9, 1940. On June 23, 1961 Pope John XXIII appointed him as the Titular Bishop of Cedamusa and Auxiliary Bishop of St. Louis. He was consecrated a bishop by Cardinal Joseph Ritter on August 8, 1961. The principal co-consecrators were Bishops John Cody of Kansas City-St. Joseph and Leo Byrne of Wichita. He continued to serve as an auxiliary bishop until his resignation was accepted by Pope John Paul II on August 2, 1988. He died at the age of 87 on March 11, 2002.

Catholic Church titles
Preceded by –	Auxiliary Bishop of St. Louis; 1961–1988	Succeeded by –
