= Leo Christopher Byrne =

Roman Catholic archbishop

Most Reverend Leo C. Byrne
- Coadjutor Archbishop of St. Paul and Minneapolis
- Church: Catholic Church
- In office: July 31, 1967 - October 21, 1974
- Previous post: Coadjutor Bishop of Wichita (1961–1967)

Orders
- Ordination: June 10, 1933
- Consecration: June 29, 1954 by Joseph Ritter

Personal details
- Born: March 19, 1908 St. Louis, Missouri
- Died: October 21, 1974 (aged 66) St. Paul, Minnesota

Leo Christopher Byrne (March 19, 1908 – October 21, 1974) was a Catholic bishop who served as the Roman Catholic coadjutor Archbishop of the Archdiocese of Saint Paul and Minneapolis.

== Early life ==
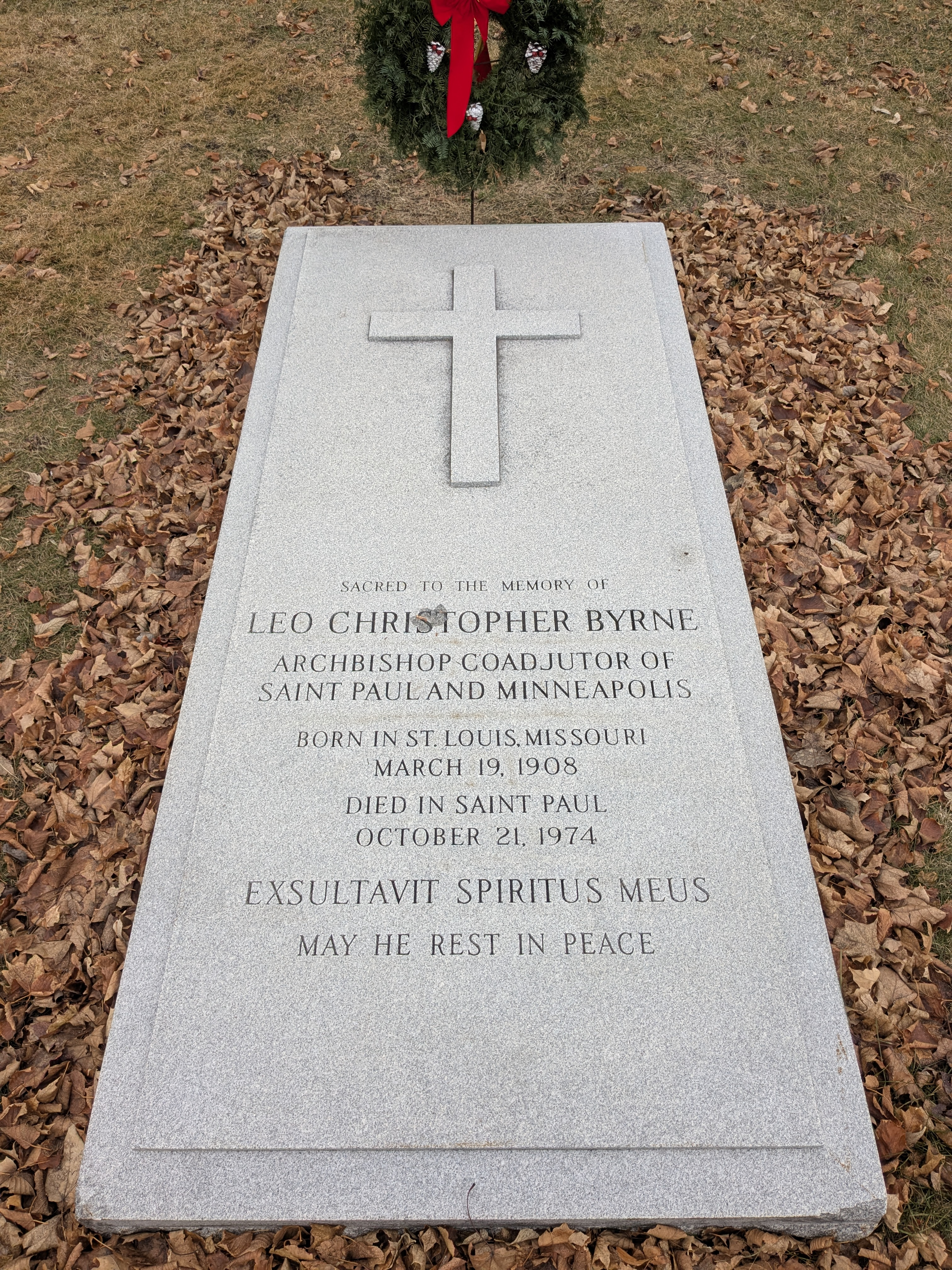
The grave of Archbishop Leo Byrne at Resurrection Cemetery in Mendota Heights, Minnesota

Byrne was born in Saint Louis, Missouri on March 19, 1908, the youngest of eight children of Mr. and Mrs. Patrick Byrne. He had five brothers and two sisters, and his uncle was Bishop Christopher Edward Byrne of Galveston. Byrne was ordained to the Roman Catholic priesthood by Archbishop John J. Glennon on June 10, 1933, for the Roman Catholic Archdiocese of Saint Louis after attending St. Louis Preparatory Seminary and Kenrick Seminary. He went on to earn master's degrees in sociology and social work at St. Louis University in 1942 and 1947, respectively.

He was the executive director of Catholic Charities St. Louis from 1944 to 1950. On October 21, 1953, he was named a monsignor.

== Episcopacy ==
On May 21, 1954, Pope Pius XII appointed Byrne auxiliary bishop of the Roman Catholic Archdiocese of Saint Louis, and he was consecrated on June 29, 1954. Archbishop Joseph E. Ritter was the consecrator, with Bishop Mark Carroll and Bishop John Cody as primary co-consecrators.

On February 11, 1961, Pope John XXIII appointed Bishop Byrne the coadjutor bishop of the Roman Catholic Diocese of Wichita, in Wichita, Kansas. Upon Mark Carroll's retirement on February 15, 1963, Byrne became the apostolic administrator sede plena (transl. the see being occupied), with Carroll retaining the office of archbishop. He attended all four sessions of the Second Vatican Council. The episcopal advisor of the National Laywomen's Retreat Movement, he was seen as a "staunch defender" and proponent of the rights of women in the church.

Pope Paul VI appointed Byrne as coadjutor archbishop of the Saint Paul-Minneapolis archdiocese on July 31, 1967. His responsibilities in the archdiocese included running the programs of confirmations and education. In 1971, he began service as the vice-president of the National Conference of Catholic Bishops. He attended the Second Ordinary General Assembly of the Synod of Bishops in 1971.

Byrne was found dead from cardiac arrest in his room in the morning on October 21, 1974. His funeral was on October 25, 1974, at the Cathedral of Saint Paul, and he was buried at Resurrection Cemetery.

Catholic Church titles
Preceded by Leo Binz	Coadjutor Archbishop of Saint Paul and Minneapolis; 1967-1974	Succeeded by Leo Binz
Preceded by Mark Kenny Carroll	Coadjutor Bishop of Wichita; 1961-1967	Succeeded by David Monas Maloney
