= Joseph Chartrand =

American prelate

The Most Reverend Joseph Chartrand
- Bishop of Indianapolis
- See: Indianapolis
- Installed: September 7, 1918
- Term ended: December 8, 1933
- Predecessor: Francis Silas Chatard
- Successor: Joseph Ritter
- Other post: Coadjutor Bishop of Indianapolis (1910–1918)

Orders
- Ordination: September 24, 1892
- Consecration: September 7, 1918 by Richard Pius Miles, OP

Personal details
- Born: May 11, 1870 St. Louis, Missouri
- Died: December 8, 1933 (aged 63) Indianapolis, Indiana, U.S.
- Buried: Calvary Chapel Mausoleum
- Denomination: Catholic

Styles of Joseph Chartrand
- Reference style: The Right Reverend
- Spoken style: Your Excellency
- Religious style: Bishop
- Posthumous style: none

Joseph Chartrand (May 11, 1870 – December 8, 1933) was an American prelate of the Catholic Church. He was the 6th Bishop of Indianapolis, serving from 1918 until his death in 1933.

== Biography ==
Joseph Chartrand was born in St. Louis, Missouri, to Joseph and Margaret (née Sullivan) Chartrand. His father, who was also born in Missouri, was of French descent; his mother was a native of County Kerry in Ireland.

He studied at Saint Meinrad Seminary and was ordained to the priesthood on September 24, 1892, for the Diocese of Vincennes, which later became the Archdiocese of Indianapolis. He was made vicar general of Indianapolis on February 13, 1910.

On July 27, 1910, Chartrand was appointed Coadjutor Bishop of Indianapolis and Titular Bishop of Flavias by Pope Pius X. He received his episcopal consecration on the following September 15 from Archbishop Diomede Falconio, with Bishops Denis O'Donaghue and Herman Alerding serving as co-consecrators. Chartrand succeeded the late Francis Silas Chatard as the sixth Bishop of Indianapolis on September 7, 1918.

In May 1925, Chartrand was named Archbishop of Cincinnati and John McNicholas, Bishop of Duluth, Minnesota was named Bishop of Indianapolis. For reasons that are unknown, Chartrand was able to convince Rome that he should not take that post, so in July 1925, the two men switched and McNicholas was named Archbishop of Cincinnati and Chartrand was reappointed to Indianapolis.

Chartrand was once described as an "able" bishop, and as "probably closer in contact with his flock than any other" bishop. He was also named an Assistant at the Pontifical Throne on February 4, 1928.

Bishop Chartrand died in Indianapolis, at the age of 63. He was initially buried in the crypt of Saints Peter and Paul Cathedral, but his remains were later transferred to the Calvary Chapel Mausoleum on June 8, 1976.

Catholic Church titles
Preceded by Francis Silas Marean Chatard	Bishop of Indianapolis; 1918–1933	Succeeded by Joseph Elmer Ritter
