= Franciscan Sisters of Our Lady of Perpetual Help =

The Franciscan Sisters of Our Lady of Perpetual Help is a Roman Catholic religious congregation for women. They strive to be prayerful women of faith, prophetic vision and courage. In the words of one of the foundresses, Mother Ernestine Matz, "There is no place too far, no service too humble, and no person too lowly."

Currently, the congregational headquarters is in Kirkwood, Missouri. As of 2014, 93 religious sisters minister in fourteen dioceses in 10 states in the fields of education, healthcare, social services, and parish ministry.

== History ==
Congregation was founded in St. Louis, Missouri on 29 May 1901, by three members of the Franciscan Sisters of Mary Immaculate of Joliet, Illinois: Sister Solana Leczna, Sister Ernestine Matz, and Sister Hilaria Matz. Responding to the needs of the immigrants for Polish-speaking Sisters, these three separated from the Joliet Franciscans to remain at St. Stanislaus Kostka in St. Louis, a parish consisting of 2,300 parishioners with over 600 children in the school.

In the early twentieth century, the vision of the Sisters broadened beyond only Polish-speaking parishes to include staffing other schools in predominantly rural parishes in Missouri and Illinois. In 1906, Mother Solana signed a court document giving the Sisterhood an official title the Polish Franciscan School Sisters of St. Louis. The congregation was known by that name for over twenty years.

From 1907 to 1957, the Sisters' central headquarters was the Motherhouse at 3419 Gasconade Street in South St. Louis. Additions were made to accommodate the growing needs of a number of sisters. During those 50 years, the ministry expanded to include schools in all parts of the country.

By the early 1940s the Sisters ministered in elementary and secondary schools in Louisiana and New Mexico working with African American and Hispanic students, and teaching, counseling and social work with the impoverished families at the Catholic Indian Center in Gallup, New Mexico.

The initial apostolate of education was expanded in 1953 to include work in the health care ministry with the acquisition of hospitals in Green Springs, Ohio, and Humboldt, Tennessee.

In the early 1960s, the Sisters responded to an invitation from the Bishop of Thailand to teach English and provide religious instruction to children. The Sisters taught at the Star of the Sea (School for Girls), the Congregation's first "foreign mission" in Phuket, Thailand for seven years.

In the 1990s, escalating retirement needs and costs, and the expansion of the airport influenced major decisions for the Sisters. Bound by a common heart rather than a common place or work, and in the poverty of spirit for the sake of mission, the Sisters divested of the Motherhouse and property in Ferguson. They built administrative offices in Kirkwood, Missouri, and the sisters moved into apartments, convents and homes, allowing the Sisters to live and work among God's people.

== Tau Center ==
The Tau Center in Kirkwood is the administrative office of the congregation, which has adopted care of the earth as a modern core function of their ministry, working through education, collaboration, and advocacy. Under the Franciscans for Earth Program, the center, built in 1998, incorporates a number of "green" initiatives. To further their commitment to ecological stewardship they host Earth Events, including a 2015 Fall-Winter Eco-film Series.
