= Charles Roman Koester =

American Bishop

Most Reverend Charles Roman Koester
- Auxiliary Bishop of St. Louis
- Church: Catholic Church
- See: Titular See of Suacia
- In office: February 11, 1971 - September 10, 1991

Orders
- Ordination: December 20, 1941
- Consecration: February 11, 1971 by John Joseph Carberry

Personal details
- Born: September 10, 1918 Jefferson City, Missouri
- Died: December 24, 1997 (aged 82) St. Louis, Missouri

Charles R. Koester (September 16, 1915 – December 24, 1997) was an American Bishop of the Catholic Church. He served as an auxiliary bishop of the Archdiocese of St. Louis from 1971 to 1991.

== Biography ==
Born in Jefferson City, Missouri, Charles Roman Koester was ordained a priest for the Archdiocese of St. Louis on December 20, 1941. He was at St Ambrose Church in the early 1940s and help guide a young Yogi Berra and Joe Garagiola. Father Koester continued to advise Berra for the rest of his life. On January 2, 1971 Pope Paul VI appointed him as the Titular Bishop of Suacia and Auxiliary Bishop of St. Louis. He was consecrated by Cardinal John Joseph Carberry on February 11, 1971. The principal co-consecrators were Bishops Glennon Flavin of Lincoln and Lawrence Graves Auxiliary Bishop of Little Rock. He continued to serve as an auxiliary bishop until his resignation was accepted by Pope John Paul II on September 10, 1991. He died at the age of 82 on December 24, 1997.

Catholic Church titles
Preceded by –	Auxiliary Bishop of St. Louis; 1971–1991	Succeeded by –
