= David Monas Maloney =

American prelate

His Excellency, The Most Reverend David Monas Maloney
- Bishop of Wichita; Titular Bishop of Ruspae
- Church: Roman Catholic Church
- See: Diocese of Wichita
- In office: January 4, 1961 to July 16, 1982
- Predecessor: Mark Kenny Carroll
- Successor: Eugene John Gerber
- Previous posts: Auxiliary Bishop of Denver; 1960 to 1967

Orders
- Ordination: December 8, 1936 by Francesco Selvaggiani
- Consecration: January 4, 1961 by Egidio Vagnozzi

Personal details
- Born: March 15, 1912 Littleton, Colorado, US
- Died: February 15, 1995 (aged 82) Wichita, Kansas, US
- Education: University of Colorado; St. Thomas Seminary; Pontifical Gregorian University; Pontifical Roman Athenaeum Saint Apollinare
- Motto: Deus auxilium meum (God is my help)

David Monas Maloney (March 15, 1912 – February 15, 1995) was an American prelate of the Roman Catholic Church. He served as bishop of the Diocese of Wichita in Kansas from 1967 to 1982. He previously served as an auxiliary bishop of what was then the Diocese of Denver in Colorado from 1960 to 1967.

== Biography ==
=== Early life ===
One of eight children, David Maloney was born on March 15, 1912, in Littleton, Colorado, to James Edward and Margaret (née Flynn) Maloney. After graduating from Littleton High School, Maloney studied at the University of Colorado (1929–1930) and at St. Thomas Seminary in Denver, obtaining a Bachelor of Arts degree in 1933. He then earned a Licentiate of Sacred Theology from the Pontifical Gregorian University in Rome in 1937.

Maloney was ordained to the priesthood in Rome for the Diocese of Denver by Cardinal Francesco Selvaggiani on December 8, 1936. In 1940, he earned a doctorate in canon law from the Pontifical Roman Athenaeum S. Apollinare. Upon his return to Colorado in 1940, he was assigned as a curate at St. Philomena Parish in Denver. In 1943, Maloney was appointed secretary to Bishop Urban Vehr and assistant chancellor of the diocese. He became chancellor in 1954.

=== Auxiliary Bishop of Denver ===
On November 5, 1960, Maloney was appointed as an auxiliary bishop of what was now the Archdiocese of Denver and titular bishop of Ruspae by Pope John XXIII. He received his episcopal consecration at the Cathedral of the Immaculate Conception in Denver on January 4, 1961, from Archbishop Egidio Vagnozzi, with Bishops Urban Vehr and Hubert Newell serving as co-consecrators. Representing the ailing Archbishop Vehr, Maloney attended all four sessions of the Second Vatican Council in Rome between 1962 and 1965.

=== Bishop of Wichita ===
Maloney was named the fifth bishop of Wichita by Pope Paul VI on December 2, 1967. In 1969, he joined other Catholic bishops in Kansas in opposing changes in state law that proposed allowing physicians to perform abortions in licensed and accredited hospitals. In 1977, he publicly declared that he would defy a city ordinance that prohibited discrimination in employment, housing and public accommodations based on sexual orientation.

=== Retirement and death ===
On July 16, 1982, Pope John Paul II accepted Maloney's resignation as bishop of the Diocese of Wichita. David Maloney died at the St. Francis Regional Medical Center in Wichita on February 15, 1995, at age 82.

Catholic Church titles
Preceded by Mark Kenny Carroll	Bishop of Wichita; 1967–1982	Succeeded by Eugene John Gerber
