= Mark Kenny Carroll =

American prelate

His Excellency, The Most Reverend Mark Kenny Carroll
- Bishop of Wichita; Titular Bishop of Taparura
- See: Diocese of Wichita
- In office: 1947–1967
- Predecessor: Christian Herman Winkelmann
- Successor: David Monas Maloney

Orders
- Ordination: June 10, 1922 by John Joseph Glennon
- Consecration: April 23, 1948 by Joseph Ritter

Personal details
- Born: November 19, 1896 St. Louis, Missouri, U.S.
- Died: January 12, 1985 (aged 88) Wichita, Kansas, U.S.
- Denomination: Roman Catholic
- Parents: Thomas and Mary (née Kenny) Carroll
- Education: St. Louis Preparatory Seminary; Kenrick Seminary
- Motto: Unitas caritas fidelitas (Unity, charity, fidelity)

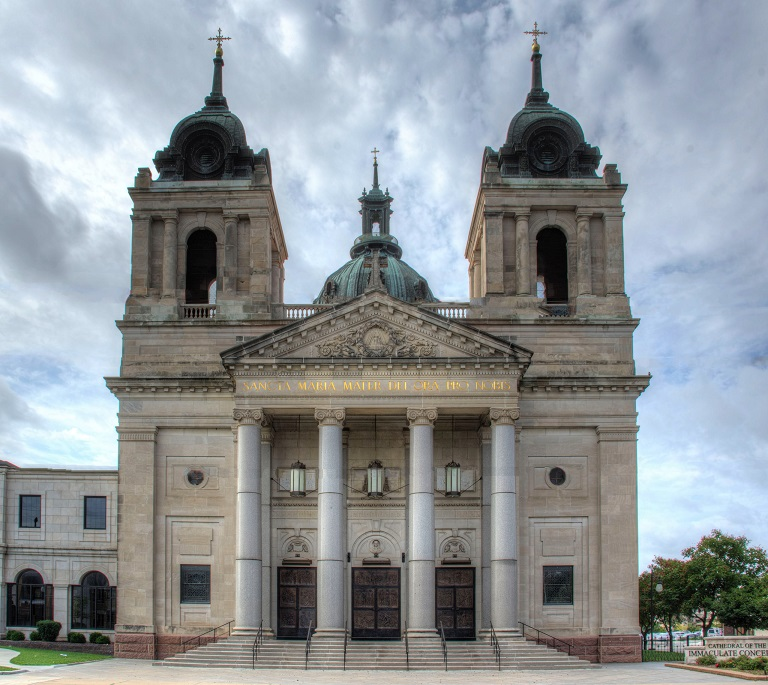
Cathedral of the Immaculate Conception, where Carroll was bishop

Mark Kenny Carroll (November 19, 1896 – January 12, 1985) was an American prelate of the Roman Catholic Church. He served as bishop of the Diocese of Wichita in Kansas from 1947 to 1967.

== Biography ==
=== Early life ===
One of twelve children, Mark Carroll was born on November 19, 1896, in St. Louis, Missouri, to Thomas and Mary (née Kenny) Carroll. His father was a police officer. After attending St. Louis Preparatory Seminary in St. Louis, he studied at Kenrick Seminary in Shrewsbury, Missouri, from 1916 to 1922.

=== Priesthood ===
Carroll was ordained to the priesthood in Webster Groves, Missouri, for the Archdiocese of St. Louis on June 10, 1922 by Archbishop John Joseph Glennon. After his ordination, the archdiocese assigned Carroll as a curate at Immaculate Conception Parish in Maplewood, Missouri, and at St. Rose's Parish in St. Louis.

He was named director of the diocesan chaptrer of Society for the Propagation of the Faith and the Association of the Holy Childhood in 1924, and vice-chancellor of the archdiocese in 1929. He later served as rector of the cathedral school (1931–1946) and director of Calvary Cemetery in St. Louis (1937–1947). The Vatican elevated Carroll to the rank of papal chamberlain in 1937 and domestic prelate in 1943. He served as pastor of the Old Cathedral Parish in St. Louis from 1937 until 1942, when he was transferred to St. Margaret's Parish in St. Louis.

=== Bishop of Wichita ===
On February 15, 1947, Carroll was appointed the fourth bishop of Wichita by Pope Pius XII. He received his episcopal consecration at the Cathedral of Saint Louis in St. Louis on April 23, 1947, from Archbishop Joseph Ritter, with Archbishop Paul Schulte and Bishop George Donnelly serving as co-consecrators. He was installed at Wichita on May 6, 1947.

In 1948, Carroll called for the repeal of the state prohibition law against alcohol sales because it was "an unwarrantable infringement" on "reasonable liberty." In 1951, he became first Catholic clergyman in the United States to receive the National Conference of Christians and Jews citation for "promoting amity and understanding among all elements of our pluralistic society."

Carroll attended all four sessions of the Second Vatican Council in Rome between 1962 and 1965, and became an outspoken proponent of ecumenism and of the use of vernacular in the mass. He also supported the American Civil Rights Movement, and his self-confessed mission was "to preach equality of man and dignity and worth."

Carroll relinquished the active administration of the diocese in 1963.

=== Retirement and legacy ===
On September 27, 1967, Pope Paul VI accepted Carroll's resignation as bishop of Wichita and appointed him titular bishop of Taparura. Carroll resigned his titular see on January 16, 1976.

Mark Carroll died from cancer at St. Joseph Medical Center in Wichita on January 12, 1985, at age 88.Bishop Carroll Catholic High School in Wichita is named in his honor.

Catholic Church titles
Preceded by Christian Herman Winkelmann	Bishop of Wichita; 1947–1967	Succeeded by David Monas Maloney
