= Joseph Ritter =

Catholic cardinal from the United States

His Eminence Joseph Elmer Ritter
- Cardinal, Archbishop of St. Louis
- See: St. Louis
- Appointed: July 20, 1946
- Term ended: June 10, 1967
- Predecessor: John J. Glennon
- Successor: John Carberry
- Other post: Cardinal-Priest of Santissimo Redentore e Sant'Alfonso in Via Merulan
- Previous posts: Archbishop of Indianapolis (1934-1946); Auxiliary Bishop of Indianapolis (1933-1934)

Orders
- Ordination: May 30, 1917 by Joseph Chartrand
- Consecration: March 28, 1933 by Joseph Chartrand
- Created cardinal: January 16, 1961 by John XXIII
- Rank: Cardinal-Priest

Personal details
- Born: July 20, 1892 New Albany, Indiana, US
- Died: June 10, 1967 (aged 74) St. Louis, Missouri, US
- Motto: Ipsa duce non fatigaris (The leader has not wearied); Miles es Christi sum (I am a soldier of Christ)

Ordination history of Joseph Ritter
History
Episcopal consecration
- Consecrated by: Joseph Chartrand (Indianapolis)
- Date: March 28, 1933
Episcopal succession
Bishops consecrated by Joseph Ritter as principal consecrator
- Mark Kenny Carroll: April 23, 1947
- John Cody: July 2, 1947
- Leo John Steck: May 20, 1948
- David Hickey, S.J.: September 21, 1948
- Charles Helmsing: April 19, 1949
- Leo Christopher Byrne: June 29, 1954
- Glennon Patrick Flavin: May 30, 1957
- George Joseph Gottwald: August 8, 1961

Joseph Elmer Ritter (July 20, 1892 – June 10, 1967) was an American Catholic prelate who served as Archbishop of St. Louis from 1946 until his death in 1967. He was created a cardinal in 1961. He previously served as auxiliary bishop (1933–1934), bishop and later Archbishop of Indianapolis (1934–1946). Ritter was one of the cardinals elector who participated at the papal conclave in 1963.

Ritter is noted for ending racial discrimination in church schools in both of his archdioceses long before it became mandatory in the United States. He also ended hospital segregation in the Archdiocese of St. Louis and supported the education of African-American students.

== Early life and education ==
Elmer Ritter was born on July 20, 1892, in New Albany, Indiana. He was the fourth of six children of Nicholas Ritter (1859–1944) and Bertha (née Luette) (1865–1941). His father owned the Ritter Bakery in New Albany (where the family also lived). Both parents were of German descent. According to a 1946 article in the St. Louis Star and Times.;

"It was one of those shops, now rare, in which the whole family, the mother, father and the whole family had to help, either in the store part, which was in the front, or in the bakery which was in the rear."

Ritter said his father had a great reverence of education, saying, "Dad gave us all a chance to go to college, but only if we applied ourselves." Ritter received his early education at the parochial school of St. Mary of the Annunciation Church in New Albany, where the students called him "Apple-Pie Ritter".

=== Religious calling ===
During the seventh grade, Ritter decided to enter the priesthood. Ritter said "There was no vision, no voice from heaven. I simply wanted to be a priest." In 1907, he enrolled at St. Meinrad's Seminary in Saint Meinrad, Indiana, where he completed his studies in 1917.

== Priesthood ==
Ritter was ordained to the priesthood for the Diocese of Indianapolis at St. Meinrad Seminary in the Abbey Church on May 30, 1917, by Bishop Joseph Chartrand.

After his 1917 ordination, the diocese assigned Ritter as a curate at St. Patrick Parish in Indianapolis. In 1920, they transferred him to Saints Peter and Paul Cathedral Parish in Indianapolis to serve as an assistant to Chartrand. In 1922, Ritter received an honorary doctorate of theology from Pope Pius XI. Ritter was named rector of the cathedral in 1925.

== Auxiliary Bishop of Indianapolis ==
On February 3, 1933, Pius XI appointed Ritter as auxiliary bishop of Indianapolis and titular bishop of Hippos. He received his episcopal consecration on March 28, 1933, from Bishop Chartrand, with Bishops Alphonse Smith and Emmanuel Ledvina serving as co-consecrators.

As an auxiliary bishop, he also served as vicar general of the diocese from 1933 to 1934. At age 40, Ritter was one of the youngest Catholic bishops in the United States.

== Bishop of Indianapolis ==
Following Chartrand's death, Pius XI appointed Ritter as the seventh bishop of Indianapolis on March 24, 1934.

In 1937, Ritter ordered the racial integration of three girls schools in the diocese. In reaction, the Ku Klux Klan in 1938 burned a cross in front of the cathedral rectory. Undaunted, Ritter in 1943 banned racial segregation in all Catholic schools in the diocese. Some community leaders threatened to sue the diocese; his decision was opposed by some clergy. The Klan paraded outside SS. Peter and Paul Cathedral in protest. In 1941, Ritter opened St. John the Apostle Catholic Church in Evansville, Indiana, the first African-American parish in that city.

Ritter also reorganized the diocesan branch of Catholic Charities, introduced the Catholic Youth Organization to the diocese, and completed the construction of SS. Peter and Paul Cathedral. He reduced the diocesan debt by $3 million, equivalent to $53,650,647 in 2025.

== Archbishop of Indianapolis ==
The Diocese of Indianapolis was elevated to the status of an archdiocese by Pope Pius XII on October 21, 1944. Ritter was installed as its first archbishop on December 19, 1944.

== Archbishop of St. Louis ==
Ritter was appointed the fourth archbishop of the Archdiocese of St. Louis by Pius XII on July 20, 1946, succeeding the late Cardinal John J. Glennon.

St. Louis grew quickly during the post-World War II economic boom. Ritter opened an average of three parishes per year in St. Louis city and county. Ritter raised more than $125,000,000 (equivalent to $1.314538043×10^{9} in 2025) to build sixty new parishes and sixteen high schools. He started fundraising for the Cardinal Glennon Memorial Hospital for Children in St. Louis in 1949.

Ritter also developed what is now known as the Annual Catholic Appeal, which remains a primary source of financial support for many archdiocesan educational and charitable activities.

In 1950, Ritter created 31 classrooms for special needs students in archdiocesan schools and two group homes.

Ritter in 1956 established a mission in La Paz, Bolivia, one of the first missions sponsored by an American diocese. Until that time, most Catholic missions had been run by religious institutes or societies of apostolic life. Parishioners in St. Louis regularly contributed more money to these foreign missions than any archdiocese of its size. Ritter served as president of the National Catholic Educational Association from 1955 to 1956, and was named an assistant at the pontifical throne on October 5, 1956.

=== Desegregation efforts ===
As one of his first acts as archbishop, Ritter announced that Webster College, a Catholic women's college in Webster Groves, Missouri, would now accept African-American students. The Sisters of Loretto, who ran the college, had attempted to integrate it in 1945, but were blocked by Glennon. Ritter in 1947 also allowed the senior class of St. Joseph's High School, then the city's only African-American Catholic high school, to celebrate graduation for the first time at the cathedral, alongside white students.

On August 9, 1947, Ritter announced an end to racial segregation in all five St. Louis diocesan high schools before the fall term. He declared, "The cross on top of our schools must mean something," and expressed his belief in "the equality of every soul before Almighty God".

A group of over 700 white Catholics from 49 St. Louis area parishes, calling themselves the "Catholic Parents Association of Saint Louis and Saint Louis County", threatened to sue Ritter . The association claimed that Ritter's order violated Missouri state law. Association Co-chair William T. Rone said "We do not want Negro children alongside our children in the schools." Ritter refused to meet with the association's leaders; his spokesman said, "He is the father of the whole flock and must care for all, regardless of race." Ritter then issued a pastoral letter, warning about possible excommunication for Catholics "interfering with ecclesiastical office authority by having recourse to authority outside of the church".

After ruling out a lawsuit, the association did send a letter of protest to the apostolic delegate to the United States, Cardinal Amleto Giovanni Cicognani. Cicognani responded, "I am confident that everyone will readily comply with what has been so clearly proposed by the ecclesiastical authority of the Archdiocese". Ritter later ordered all the parish schools to "accept all children into parish schools without regard to race". These schools represented 25% of all students in the St. Louis area. Ritter also desegregated all Catholic hospitals in the archdiocese.

=== Cardinal ===
Ritter was created cardinal priest of SS. Redentore e S. Alfonso in Via Merulana by Pope John XXIII in the consistory of January 16, 1961.

Between 1962 and 1965, Ritter participated in all four sessions of the Second Vatican Council in Rome. Ritter was viewed as a liberal. He also protested against the Roman Curia's oppressive actions and Cardinal Alfredo Ottaviani's draft on the sources of revelation at the council.

Ritter in 1963 was "dismayed" and "indignant" after the rector of Catholic University of America, Monsignor William McDonald, refused to allow certain liberal theologians to speak at the university. On August 24, 1964, in line with reforms of the Second Vatican Council, Ritter celebrated the world's first authorized mass in English at Kiel Auditorium in St. Louis.

== Death, funeral and burial ==
Ritter died on June 10, 1967, at DePaul Hospital in St. Louis after suffering two heart attacks that week. His body lay in state at the cathedral.

Ritter's requiem mass was celebrated on June 15, 1967, at St. Louis Cathedral. At his request, it was a low funeral mass. Cardinal-designate John Cody was the main celebrant. In his sermon, Bishop Charles Helmsing spoke of Ritter's liturgical leadership, particularly "his concern for a liturgy of the Word that would truly inform and enlighten the people of God."

Ten archbishops, 48 bishops, and four abbots attended the mass. The prelates in attendance included Cardinals Richard Cushing, James Francis McIntyre, Lawrence Shehan, and Francis Spellman, along with Archbishops John Krol and Patrick O'Boyle. Fifty Protestant, Jewish, and Orthodox Christian leaders were present, representing the Episcopal Church, the Lutheran Church Missouri Synod, the United Church of Christ, the Greek Orthodox Church, the Baptists, the Disciples of Christ, the Methodist Church, the Presbyterian Church, and the Salvation Army.

Ritter was buried in the priest's lot at Calvary Cemetery in St. Louis, following his final wishes. On November 2, 1994, Archbishop Justin Rigali ordered Ritter's remains to be removed from Calvary Cemetery and re-interred in the crypt of the new cathedral, now the cathedral basilica of St. Louis.

== Viewpoints ==
=== Ecumenism ===
In 1960, Ritter declared that Catholic students must obtain written permission from the archdiocese to attend secular or non-Catholic colleges. He was concerned about their exposure to secular influences and the doctrines of other religions.

In 1964, Ritter allowed a marriage ceremony that included both Catholic and Episcopal priests at St. Genevieve du Bois Catholic Church near St. Louis. It was the first such ceremony approved by a Catholic prelate in U.S.

=== Films ===
Ritter forbade Catholics from viewing the 1954 film The French Line under danger of committing serious sin. The film featured actor Jane Russell dancing in a scanty outfit in what was then considered a sexually-suggestive scene.

== Legacy ==
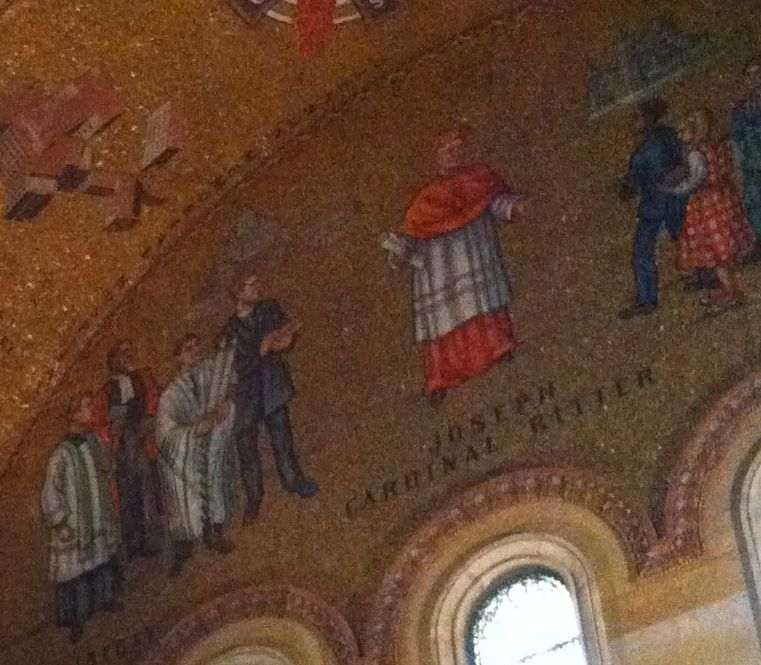
Mosaic depicting Cardinal Ritter at the Cathedral Basilica of Saint Louis

- Ritter is commemorated by a wall mosaic work in the Cathedral Basilica of Saint Louis. One side of the mosaic shows Ritter reaching out toward a group of people from other religions. The other side shows him reaching towards a multiracial group of school children.
- Ritter's birthplace and childhood home in New Albany was saved from demolition in 2001 and later restored. It is now owned by the Cardinal Ritter Birthplace Foundation and is operated as a neighborhood center.
- Cardinal Ritter High School in Indianapolis is named in his honor.
- Cardinal Ritter College Prep High School in St. Louis is named in his honor.

== Honors ==
- Honorary Doctorate of Theology from Pope Pius XI in 1922.
- Honorary Founder of Saint Louis University Award in 1961 from Saint Louis University "in honor of his leadership and influence in the cause of education".
- Ecumenical Man of the Year Award in 1965 from the Metropolitan St. Louis Church Federation. However, Ritter declined the award, saying "Grateful for the honor, I am united with you in efforts for Christian unity. But it is my practice to decline citations in line with what is obviously my duty".
- Honorary Doctor of Divinity degree from Eden Theological Seminary in St. Louis in 1965.

== See also ==
- Cardinal electors in Papal conclave, 1963

Catholic Church titles
Preceded by Joseph Chartrand	Archbishop of Indianapolis; 1934–1946	Succeeded by Paul Clarence Schulte
Preceded by John J. Glennon	Archbishop of Saint Louis; 1946–1967	Succeeded by John Carberry
