= Kenrick–Glennon Seminary =

Catholic seminary in Shrewsbury, Missouri, US

- Other name: St. Louis Roman Catholic Theological Seminary
- Type: Seminary
- Established: 1818; 208 years ago
- Founder: Louis William Valentine Dubourg
- Accreditation: HLC; ATS
- Religious affiliation: Catholic Church
- President Rector: Fr. Paul Hoesing
- Students: 135
- Location: Shrewsbury, Missouri, United States; 38.5848°N 90.3240°W
- Website: kenrick.edu

Kenrick–Glennon Seminary (legally St. Louis Roman Catholic Theological Seminary) is a Catholic seminary in Shrewsbury, Missouri that is operated by the Archdiocese of Saint Louis. Founded in 1818, the seminary is named for Archbishop Peter Richard Kenrick and Cardinal John J. Glennon, two former archbishops of Saint Louis.

Kenrick–Glennon has three college-level divisions to educate and prepare seminarians for ordination as priests. Its students come from many archdioceses and dioceses.

- Cardinal Glennon College is the undergraduate division. It offers a Bachelor of Arts (B.A.) degree in philosophy.
- Kenrick School of Theology: Theologate Program is the graduate division. It offers a Master of Divinity degree (M.Div.) and a Master of Arts degree in theology (M.A.),
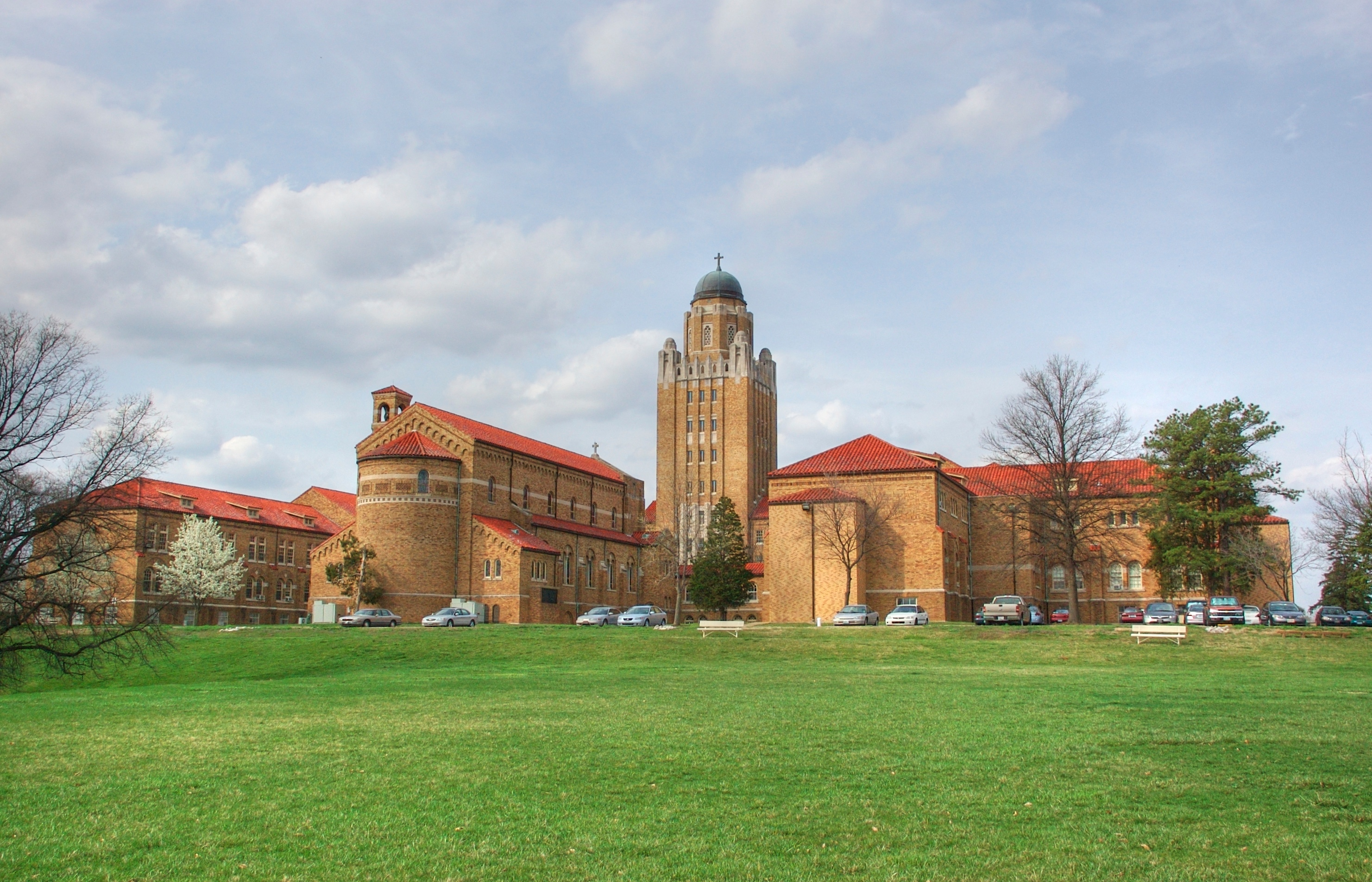
- A view of Kenrick-Glennon Seminary from the Southeast corner of the property (c. 2007).
  Kenrick School of Theology: Pre-Theology Program is for those who had already obtained a college degree prior to entering Seminary, to study philosophy.

== History ==
Kenrick–Glennon traces its origins to the first seminary in the region, which opened in 1818. Since then, it has changed name, location and programs numerous times to meet the changing needs of seminarians.

=== 19th century ===
Kenrick–Glennon Seminary began in 1818 as Saint Mary's of the Barrens Seminary in Perryville, Missouri. Founded by the Vincentian order, it was the first Catholic seminary in American territory west of the Mississippi River. In 1842, then Bishop Kenrick established a major seminary in St. Louis. The Perryville facility remained a minor seminary. Due to problems with the seminary house in St. Louis, Kenrick move the major seminary to Carondelet, Missouri in 1848; it became known as the Carondelet Seminary. In 1858, the major and minor seminaries both moved to Cape Giradeau, Missouri, to become Saint Vincent College. However, the American Civil War in the 1860s caused a drop in enrollment, curtailing the formation programs there.

In 1893, then bishop John Kain reestablished the major seminary in St. Louis by starting college programs in philosophy and theology; the new college was named Kenrick Seminary.

=== 20th century ===
In 1900, Kain reestablished the minor seminary in the same building as Kenrick Seminary, calling it the Kenrick Preparatory Seminary. Archbishop Glennon The Archdiocese purchased the Drummond farm, and moved Kenrick Preparatory Seminary in 1915 to a larger campus in Shrewsbury, Missouri.

The former facility suffered extensive tornado damage in 1927.

In 1931, the Vincentians opened Saint Louis Preparatory Seminary at the Shrewsbury campus. Saint Louis provided the last two years of high school with four years of college. Kenrick Preparatory Seminary now became Cathedral Latin School, a four year high school program. In 1947, Archbishop Joseph Ritter reorganized the seminary programs yet again:

- Closing Cathedral Latin school
- Keeping Kenrick Seminary as a four-year school of theology
- Changing St. Louis Preparatory Seminary in Shrewsbury to a four-year high school program
- Creating a four-year college program in Shrewsbury, later called Cardinal Glennon College

Facing increased seminary enrollment in the 1960s, Ritter opened a second high school seminary in Florissant, Missouri, called Saint Louis Preparatory Seminary North. The original high school program in Shrewsbury was now called Saint Louis Preparatory Seminary South. With drops in enrollment in the 1980s, Archbishop John L. May was forced to consolidate the seminary facilities in 1986 and 1987.

- Kenrick Seminary moved to the Cardinal Glennon College building
- Cardinal Glennon College ended its undergraduate program. Students would now attend classes for the first two years of college at Saint Louis University, the second two years at Cardinal Glennon
- Saint Louis Preparatory Seminary North was closed. The Shrewsbury campus was again called Saint Louis Preparatory Seminary.

In 1991, more shrinking enrollment forced May to close Saint Louis Preparatory Seminary in Shrewsbury, ending the high school seminary program for the archdiocese. This left Kenrick School of Theology and Cardinal Glennon College, both now operating under the name of Kenrick–Glennon Seminary.

=== 21st century ===
In November 2016, the Archdiocese of St. Louis settled a lawsuit involving the sexual abuse of a minor at a summer camp run by Kenrick–Glennon Seminary. The plaintiffs were Dan and Pat Harkins, the parents of Alex Harkins. In 2009, Alex told his parents that he had been sexually abused by Bryan Kuchar, an archdiocese priest, when he was 12 to 14 years old. Alex committed suicide in 2009 and the parents sued in 2013. Convicted of sexual abuse in a different 2003 case, Kuchar was defrocked in 2006.

In 2018, Saint Louis University integrated the Kenrick-Glennon undergraduate program into the university's program. Graduates would now receive a bachelor's degree from Saint Louis University instead of Kenrick-Glennon.

In 2021, Kenrick-Glennon committed to following a set of five sexual misconduct policy benchmarks for seminaries that was created by a working group at the University of Notre Dame.
