= Archdiocese of St. Louis =

Latin Catholic ecclesiastical jurisdiction in Missouri, United States

Coordinates: 38°38′34″N 90°15′26″W

Archdiocese of Saint Louis Archidiœcesis Sancti Ludovici

Catholic
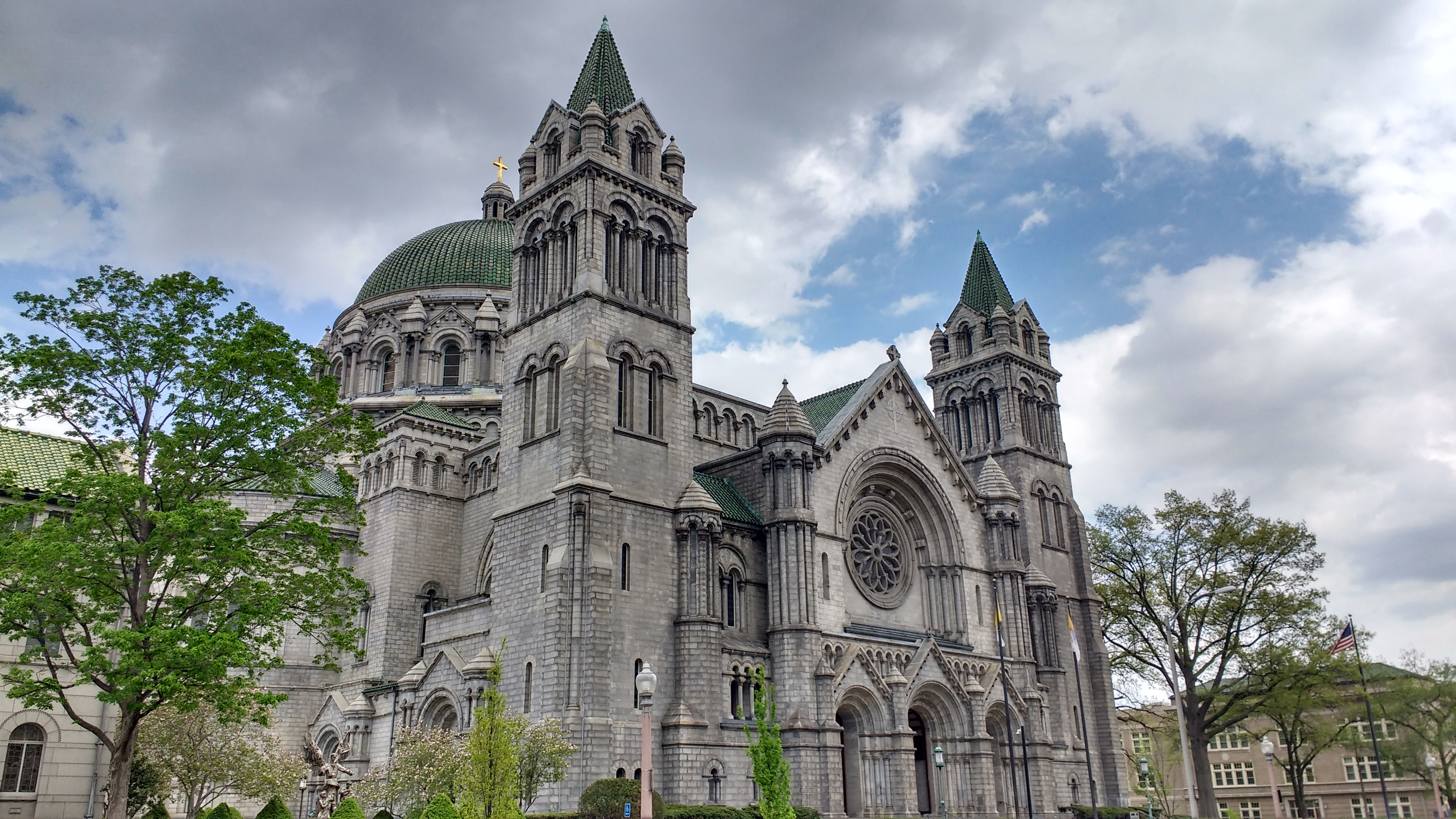
- Cathedral Basilica of Saint Louis

- Coat of arms

Location
- Country: United States
- Territory: St. Louis City and ten counties in eastern Missouri
- Ecclesiastical province: St. Louis

Statistics
- Area: 5,964 sq mi (15,450 km^{2})
- Population: Total; Catholics: (as of 2023); 2,259,000 (Note: Annuario Pontificio (2023) via Catholic-Hierarchy.org); 507,600 (22.5%)
- Parishes: 178
- Schools: 112

Information
- Denomination: Catholic
- Sui iuris church: Latin Church
- Rite: Roman Rite
- Established: July 18, 1826; 200 years ago
- Cathedral: Cathedral Basilica of Saint Louis
- Patron saint: Saint Louis IX (Primary); Saint Vincent DePaul; Saint Rose Philippine Duchesne (Secondary)
- Secular priests: 277 (plus 249 religious priests)

Current leadership
- Pope: Leo XIV
- Archbishop: Mitchell T. Rozanski
- Vicar General: Carl Scheble
- Episcopal Vicars: John Brockland Scott Jones Michael Lydon
- Judicial Vicar: Philip Bené
- Bishops emeritus: Robert Joseph Hermann; Robert James Carlson

Map
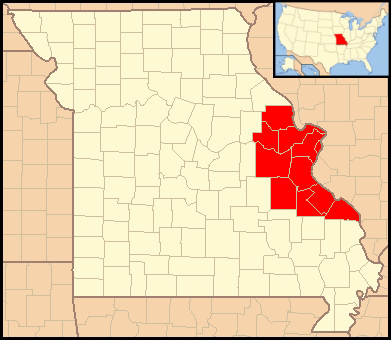

Website
- Official website

The Archdiocese of St. Louis (Latin: Archidiœcesis Sancti Ludovici) is an archdiocese of the Catholic Church in the eastern part of the U.S. state of Missouri. Mitchell Thomas Rozanski is the archbishop; the see church is the Cathedral Basilica of St. Louis.

== Structure ==
The Archdiocese of St. Louis covers the City of St. Louis and the Missouri counties of Franklin, Jefferson, Lincoln, Perry, Saint Charles, Saint Francois, Ste. Genevieve, St. Louis, Warren, and Washington. It is the metropolitan see of the ecclesiastical province containing three suffragan sees:

- Diocese of Springfield-Cape Girardeau in southern Missouri
- Diocese of Jefferson City in northeastern Missouri
- Diocese of Kansas City-Saint Joseph in western Missouri

== History ==
=== 1600 to 1800 ===
The first Catholic presence in present-day Missouri was that of the Jesuit missionary Jacques Marquette in 1673, who stopped in Perry County while voyaging down the Mississippi River. In 1759, French-Canadian settlers established St. Genevieve, the first parish in the archdiocese, in Ste. Genevieve, Missouri. During this period, the Catholics in the region were under the jurisdiction of the Diocese of Québec. With the end of the French and Indian War in 1763, Spain took control of the French territories west of the Mississippi River and the region became part of the Diocese of Santiago de Cuba until 1787, and later the Diocese of Havana.

In 1793, after the American Revolution, Pope Pius VI erected the Diocese of Louisiana and the Two Floridas, based in New Orleans. It encompassed all the Spanish territories on the continent, including the Missouri area. Due to politics in Europe, the new diocese did not receive a bishop between 1801 and 1815.

=== 1800 to 1826 ===
In 1803, with the signing of the Louisiana Purchase, the United States took control from France of a vast area of the continent, including Missouri. Pope Pius VII in 1815 named Louis Dubourg from the Diocese of Baltimore as the first bishop of Louisiana and the Two Floridas. Due to concerns about his personal safety in New Orleans, Dubourg chose the City of St. Louis as his episcopal see. He founded St.Louis Parish, the first parish in the city.

Wanting to train American priests for his vast diocese, DuBourg established St. Mary's of the Barrens Seminary in Perryville in 1818, placing it under the charge of the Lazarist fathers. In August 1818, he recruited Sister Rose Philippine Duchesne from the Society of the Sacred Heart in France, to open girls schools in the diocese. Duchesne founded the Academy of the Sacred Heart in St. Charles, the first free school west of the Mississippi River, along with another girls school in Florissant. DuBourg also invited the Sisters of Loretto to establish a school for girls. In 1818, DuBourg founded the Saint Louis Academy, later known as Saint Louis College, to educate Catholic laymen. In 1823, at DuBourg's invitation, the Society of Jesus sent several Belgian priests to Florissant, where they began ministering to Native American converts.

In 1824, Pope Leo XII appointed Bishop Joseph Rosati as coadjutor bishop of the Diocese of Louisiana and the Two Floridas. After Rosati's appointment, Dubourg moved his episcopal see back to New Orleans, leaving Rosati in control of St. Louis.

=== 1826 to 1847 ===
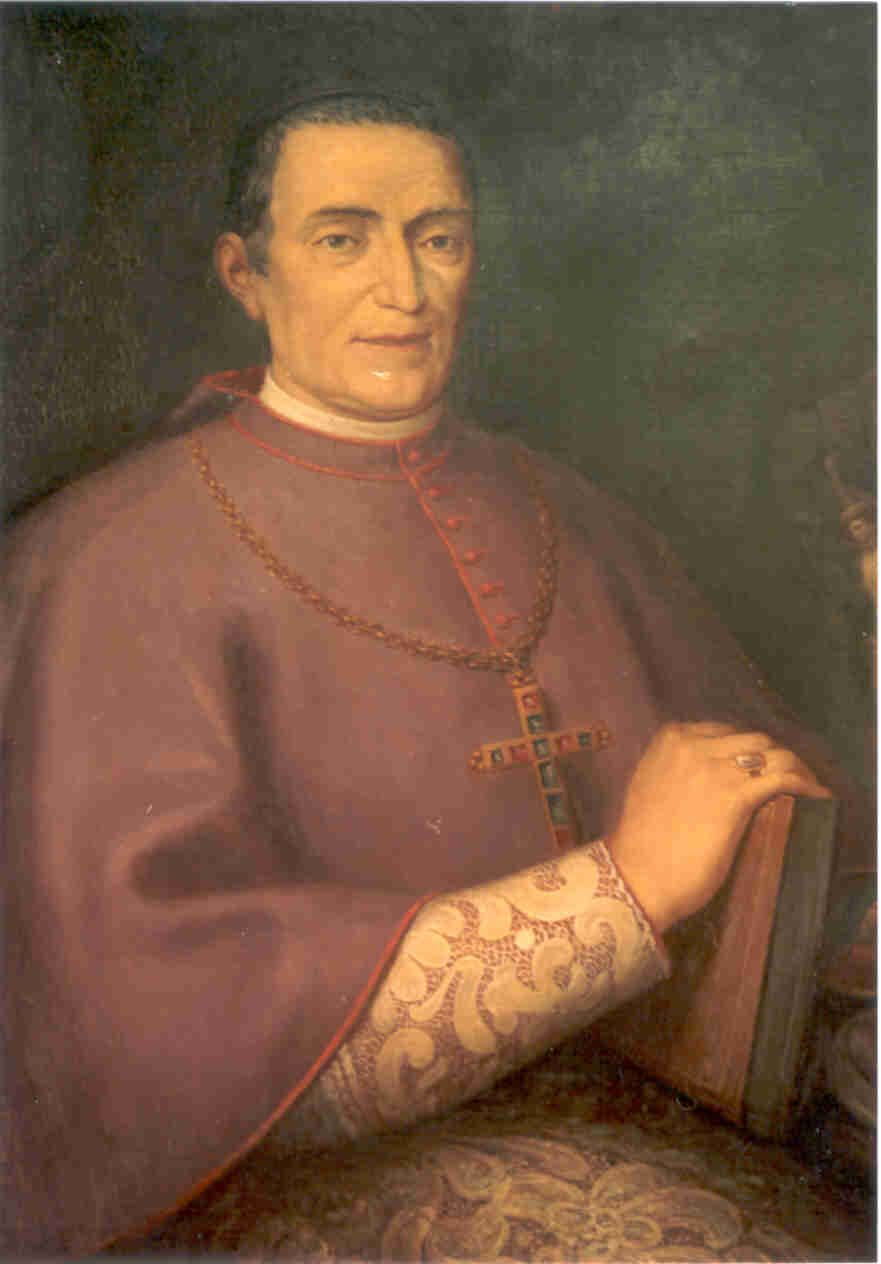
Bishop Rosati

On July 18, 1826, Pope Leo XII divided the Diocese of Louisiana and the Two Floridas. One of the new dioceses was the Diocese of St. Louis, which included Missouri along with vast areas of the American Midwest and Great Plains. Because of its size, the diocese was often referred to as the Rome of the West. Leo XII named Rosati as the first bishop of St. Louis.

In 1827, Rosati transferred Saint Louis College to the Jesuits. They converted the lower division of the college into St. Louis University High School. The Daughters of Charity of St. Vincent de Paul opened Mullanphy Hospital in St. Louis in 1828. The Jesuits established Saint Louis College as Saint Louis University in 1829. Rosati dedicated the Cathedral of St. Louis in 1834, making it the first Catholic cathedral west of the Mississippi River.

As Catholic communities started increasing outside of St. Louis, the Vatican erected new dioceses from the Diocese of St. Louis. In 1837, Pope Gregory XVI erected the Diocese of Dubuque, covering the present-day states of Iowa, Minnesota, and the Dakotas. The same pope appointed Peter Kenrick as coadjutor bishop in St. Louis to assist Rosati in 1841. When Kenrick became coadjutor bishop, the diocese was heavily in debt due to the $90,000 cost of the new cathedral. With Rosati's assistance, the diocese received financial aid from Catholic organizations in Europe. Kenrick's brother Francis Kenrick, bishop of the Diocese of Philadelphia, also provided the diocese with assistance.

In early 1843, the Vatican took more territory from St. Louis to found the Diocese of Little Rock in Arkansas and the Diocese of Chicago in Illinois. After Rosati died in Rome in late 1843, Kenrick automatically succeeded him as bishop of St. Louis.

After receiving a $300,000 bequest, Kenrick was able to stabilize the diocesan finances through some shrewd real estate dealings. He took many trips by horseback throughout the diocese, reaching Catholics who did not have priests serving their communities. In St. Louis, Kenrick instructed the cathedral priests to preach in English instead of French, as most of the congregation was now English-speaking.

=== 1847 to 1900 ===
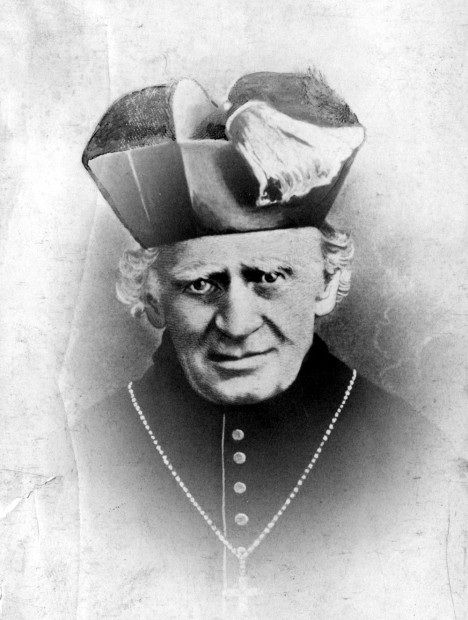
Archbishop Kenrick (pre-1896)

Pope Pius IX elevated the Diocese of St. Louis to the Archdiocese of St. Louis on July 20, 1847, naming Kenrick as its first archbishop. It was the third metropolitan archdiocese in the United States after Baltimore (archdiocese since 1808) and Oregon City (now Portland, archdiocese since 1846). By 1850, the archdiocese was operating ten parishes in the City of St. Louis.

During the American Civil War, Kenrick maintained a neutral position in a strongly divided Missouri. After the war, he urged his priests to refuse to take the ironclad oath to the United States Government. The oath was a tactic promoted by Republicans to block former officials of the Confederacy from holding influential positions in society. John A. Cummings challenged the legality of the oath in a case that reached the United States Supreme Court. It later ruled that the government could not force individuals to take the oath.

In May 1893, Pope Leo XIII appointed Bishop John Kain from the Diocese of Wheeling as coadjutor archbishop to assist Kenrick. When Kenrick died in June 1895, Kain succeeded him as archbishop. During his tenure as archbishop, Kain purchased property in St. Louis for a new cathedral. However, a tornado in the archdiocese depleted its funds, delaying the start of its construction.

=== 1900 to 1950 ===
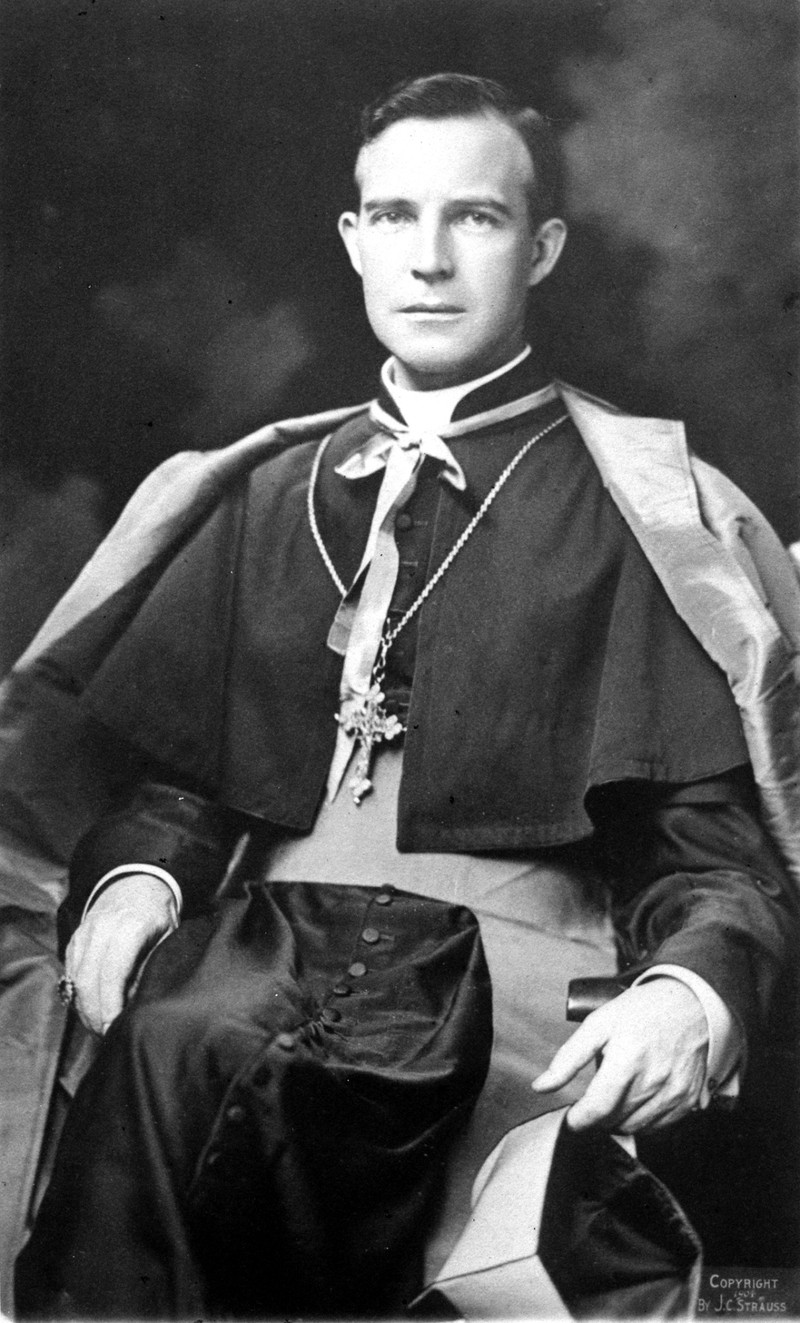
Archbishop Glennon (1904)

Pope Pius X named Coadjutor Bishop John J. Glennon from the Diocese of Kansas City to serve as coadjutor archbishop of St. Louis in 1903 to assist the ailing Kain. When Kain died in October 1903, Glennon automatically succeeded him as archbishop. He opened the new Kenrick Seminary in St. Louis in 1915, followed by the minor seminary in Shrewsbury. Also in 1915, the Sisters of Loretto opened Webster College in Webster Groves. It is today Webster University. The Sisters of St. Joseph established Fontbonne College in 1923 in Clayton. Now Fontbonne University, it announced that it was closing in mid-2025.

During the early 1940s, many local Jesuit priests challenged the segregationist policies at the St. Louis Catholic schools. In 1943, Glennon blocked a young African-American woman from enrolling at Webster College. When some priests confronted Glennon about this, he called the integration plan a "Jesuit ploy." He transferred one of the complaining priests from an African-American parish. Saint Louis University began admitting African American students in the summer of 1943 after its president, Patrick Holloran, gained Glennon's approval. Glennon died in 1946.

Pope Pius XII appointed Archbishop Joseph Ritter of the Archdiocese of Indianapolis as the fourth archbishop of St. Louis in 1946. The archdiocese grew quickly during the post-World War II economic boom. Ritter opened an average of three parishes per year in the City of St. Louis and St. Louis County. He raised more than $125,000,000 (equivalent to $1.314538043×10^{9} in 2025) to build 60 new parishes and 16 high schools.

As one of his first acts as archbishop, Ritter announced that Webster College would accept African-American students. In 1947, Ritter also allowed the senior class of St. Joseph's High School, then the city's only African-American Catholic high school, to celebrate graduation for the first time at the cathedral, alongside white students.

On August 9, 1947, Ritter announced an end to racial segregation in archdiocesan high schools. He declared, "The cross on top of our schools must mean something," and expressed his belief in "the equality of every soul before Almighty God". The Catholic Parents Association of Saint Louis and Saint Louis County, a group of white parents, threatened to sue Ritter, stating that his desegregation order violated Missouri state law. Ritter then issued a pastoral letter, warning about possible excommunication for Catholics "interfering with ecclesiastical office authority by having recourse to authority outside of the church". Ritter later ordered all the parish schools to "accept all children into parish schools without regard to race". Ritter also desegregated all Catholic hospitals in the archdiocese.

Ritter started fundraising for the Cardinal Glennon Memorial Hospital for Children in St. Louis in 1949. Ritter also developed what is now known as the Annual Catholic Appeal, which remains a primary source of financial support for many archdiocesan educational and charitable activities.

=== 1950 to 1980 ===
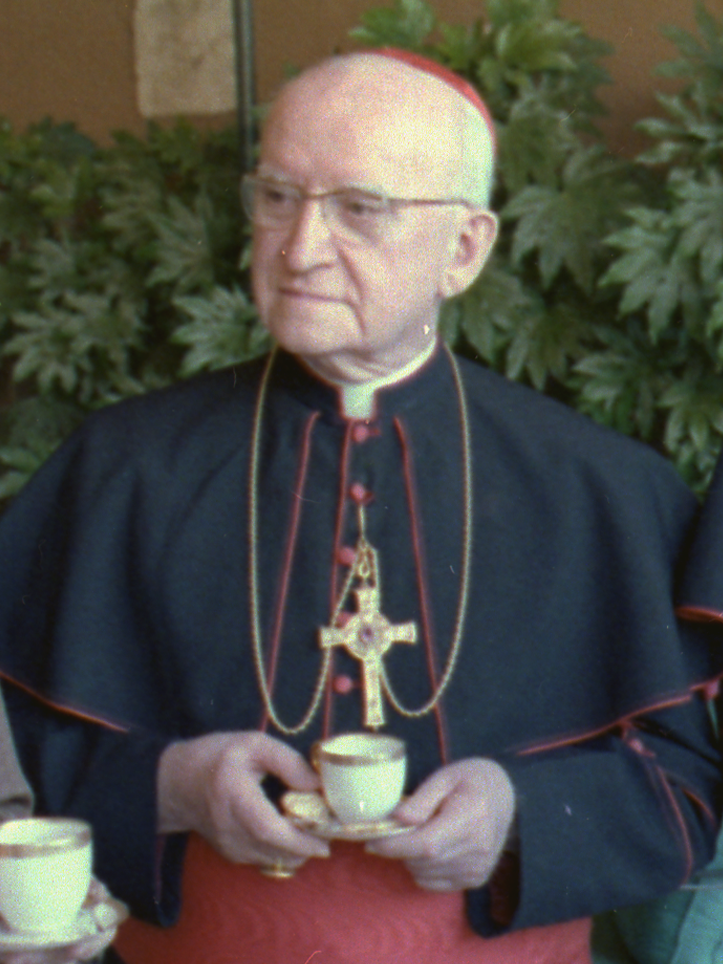
Cardinal Carberry (1978)

In 1950, Ritter created 31 classrooms for special needs students in archdiocesan schools and two group homes. In 1956, he established a mission in La Paz, Bolivia, one of the first foreign missions sponsored by an American diocese. Until that time, religious institutes or societies of apostolic life had run most foreign missions. Parishioners in the archdiocese regularly contributed more money to foreign missions than any other comparable archdiocese. In 1964, following reforms of the Second Vatican Council, Ritter celebrated the world's first authorized Mass in English at Kiel Auditorium in St. Louis. Ritter died in 1967.

On February 14, 1968, Pope Paul VI named Bishop John Carberry of the Diocese of Columbus as the fifth archbishop of St. Louis. In 1969, Carberry removed 60 seminarians from a class at the Saint Louis University Divinity School because a Presbyterian scholar was teaching a segment on the Pauline epistles.

In 1971, Carberry closed McBride High school in North St. Louis, a largely black area. He was criticized for closing the school while subsidizing a swimming pool at John F. Kennedy High School in Manchester, a wealthy white suburb. Carberry moved his own residence from the episcopal residence in St. Louis to suburban Creve Coeur. In 1972, he established the Urban Services Apostolate for inner-city parishes. Carberry initially opposed the reception of communion by hand, another Second Vatican Council reform. He believed that it was irreverent and risked the possibility of recipients stealing hosts to use at Black Masses. However, he finally permitted the practice in 1977. That same year, he ordained the first permanent deacons in the archdiocese. Carberry retired in 1979.

=== 1980 to 1990 ===
On January 24, 1980, Bishop John L. May from the Diocese of Mobile was appointed the sixth Archbishop of St. Louis by Pope John Paul II. During his 12-year tenure, May encouraged an active dialogue between Christians of all denominations. He ordained J. Terry Steib as the first African-American auxiliary bishop in the archdiocese. May also appointed the archdiocese's first chief financial officer and the first woman to serve as superintendent of Catholic schools. He started a self-insurance program in the archdiocese and improved the retirement program for lay employees.

An advocate for the poor and homeless, May greatly expanded the programs of Catholic Charities, and initiated a program for pregnant women. Due to a decline in the number of seminarians, May was forced to consolidate the archdiocesan seminary system. In 1987, he merged Cardinal Glennon College and Kenrick Seminary to form Kenrick-Glennon Seminary in Shrewsbury.

=== 1990 to 2000 ===
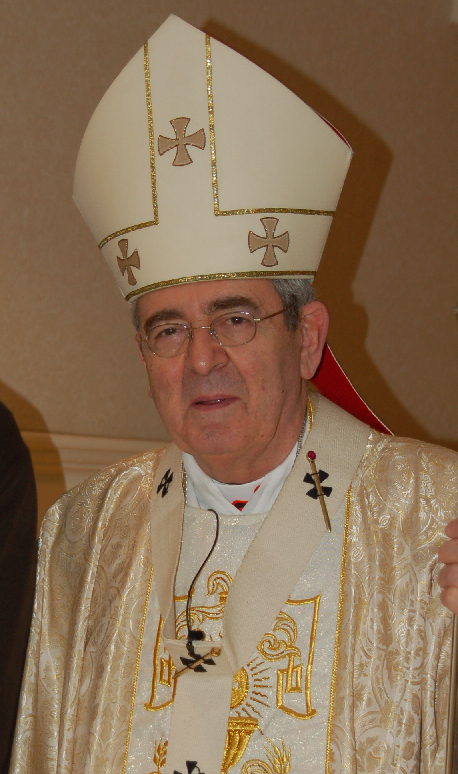
Cardinal Rigali

In 1990, with Sister Mary Ann Eckhoff and businessman Robert A. Brooks, May co-founded the Today and Tomorrow Educational Foundation. Due to health reasons, May retired in 1992.

In 1994, John Paul II named Bishop Justin Rigali from the Roman Curia as the seventh archbishop of St. Louis. During his tenure at St. Louis, Rigali visited every Catholic high school in the archdiocese. Rigali opposed collective bargaining by teachers and their efforts to unionize. Rigali was widely credited as an able administrator and effective fundraiser, if not popular with all.

In January 1999, Rigali hosted the visit of John Paul II to St. Louis. The pope reportedly decided to visit the archdiocese because of his longtime close friendship with Rigali. According to a St. Louis Business Journal in 2000, Rigali brought financial stability to the St. Louis Archdiocese.

=== 2000 to 2010 ===
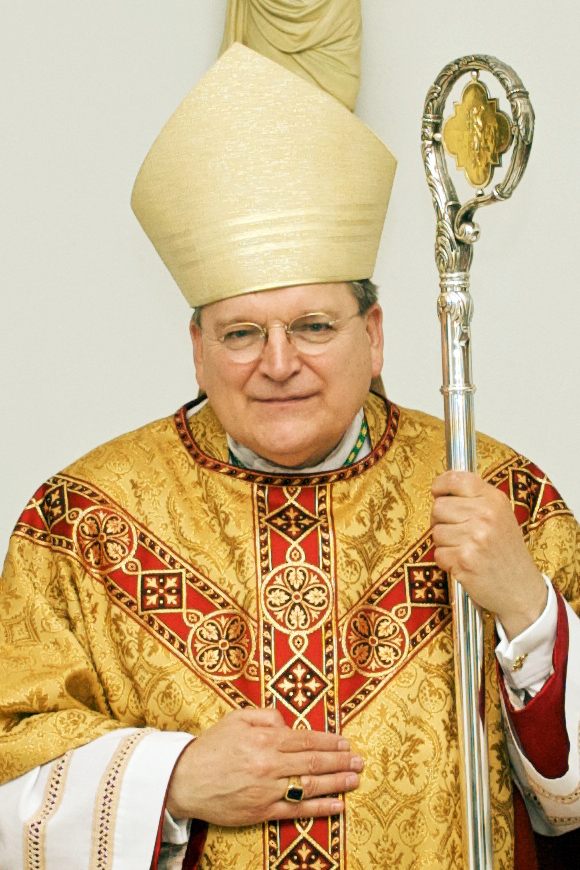
Archbishop Burke in 2008

In 2003, Rigali was appointed archbishop of the Archdiocese of Philadelphia. To replace him, John Paul II that same year named Bishop Raymond Burke from the Diocese of La Crosse as the next archbishop of St. Louis. In 2004, the Archdiocese of St. Louis paid $1.7 million to settle sexual abuse claims. In 2018, Archbishop Carlson testified in court that he was unsure whether he knew in the 1980s that sexual assault of a minor was a crime and that he did not know when he realized that fact. In 2007, Burke invited the Institute of Christ the King Sovereign Priest (ICKSP), a traditionalist Catholic order, into the archdiocese. He ordained two ICKSP priests, marking the first use in 40 years of the Tridentine rite of ordination in the Cathedral Basilica of St. Louis.

During his tenure, Burke escalated a long-running dispute over the closing of St. Stanislaus Kostka Church in St. Louis. In 2005, its pastor, Marek Bozek, led a Christmas Eve mass at the church, despite the archdiocese having closed it. Burke then "declare[d] that the church was in 'schism'", and excommunicated Bozek and the church lay board. The church then broke away from the archdiocese and sued it for ownership of its assets. In 2012, a court awarded the assets to St. Stanislaus, which has continued to operate as an Independent Catholic church.

In 2006, when voters approved an amendment to the Missouri State Constitution permitting embryonic stem cell research, Burke said it meant that "our tiniest brothers and sisters ... will be made legally the subjects, the slaves, of those who wish to manipulate and destroy their lives for the sake of supposed scientific and technological progress." In 2008, the Vatican named Burke as prefect of the Supreme Tribunal of the Apostolic Signatura in Rome.

Bishop Robert Carlson took office as the ninth archbishop of St. Louis in 2009.

=== 2010 to present ===
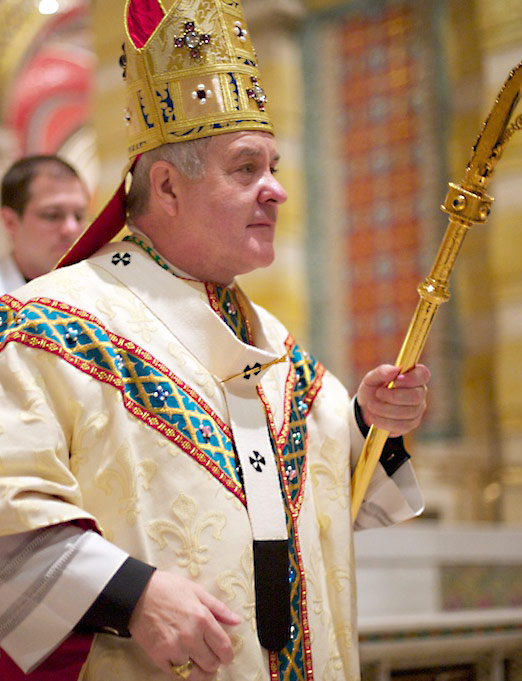
Archbishop Carlson (2010)

In 2014, after trying to reconcile with the St. Stanislaus Kostka board and parishioners, Carlson surrendered its property claims to the church. As part of the agreement, the church administration agreed not to claim any affiliation with the Catholic Church. In response to the 2018 grand jury report concerning clerical sexual abuse in Pennsylvania, Carlson invited the Missouri attorney general's office to inspect the archdiocesan files and to produce a report on clerical abuse in Missouri. Carlson retired in 2020.

In July 2019, the archdiocese released the names of 64 clergy who were credibly accused of committing acts of sexual abuse. On August 16, 2019, the "sexually violent priest" Frederick Lenczycki, who had served prison time in Illinois between 2004 and 2009 for acts of sexual abuse, was sentenced to 10 years in prison after pleading guilty to sexually abusing a boy in St. Louis County. In 2019, the Missouri Attorney General identified over 160 instances of archdiocesan priests and deacons sexually abusing minors.

Bishop Mitchell T. Rozanski from Springfield in Massachusetts replaced Carlson as the next archbishop of St. Louis. In 2022, the archdiocese ended its participation in the National School Lunch Program, established in 1946 to provide lunch to poor students, stating that it did not want to comply with regulations under the Civil Rights Act. The archdiocese stated that it would start its own free lunch program.

In May 2023, Rozanski announced All Things New, a plan to reduce the number of parishes in the archdiocese from 178 to 134. Seven parishes filed appeals of the closures in August 2023 with the Dicastery for the Clergy in Rome, which decided to accept appeals from two parishes. The Dicastery in June 2024 rejected the two appeals. In June 2023, the archdiocese agreed to pay $1 million to settle a lawsuit by a man who alleged he was raped when an altar boy from fourth through sixth grade by a since-defrocked priest who has been required to register as a sex offender.

In June 2024, the archdiocese released its report "Slavery in the Historic Archdiocese of St. Louis". It identified 70 enslaved people who had been owned by Bishop Dubourg, Bishop Rosati, and diocesan clergy prior to the end of the American Civil War.

=== Cathedral of Saint Louis ===
The Cathedral of Saint Louis was dedicated to Saint Louis IX of France. Its co-patrons are Vincent de Paul and Rose Philippine Duchesne. The cathedral contains the largest collection of mosaics in the world. It was dedicated in 1926 on the 100th anniversary of the establishment of St. Louis as a diocese. The cathedral mosaics took 60 years for completion. The Vatican designated the Cathedral of St. Louis a basilica in 1997 on the 150th anniversary of the archdiocese.

== Bishops ==
The following is a list of the archbishops, bishops, coadjutor bishop and auxiliary bishops of the diocese and archdiocese.

=== Bishop of Louisiana and the Floridas ===
Louis-Guillaume-Valentin Dubourg (1812–1826), appointed Bishop of Montauban and later Archbishop of Besançon

=== Bishops of St. Louis ===
1. Joseph Rosati, C.M. (1827–1843)
  - John Timon (Appointed Coadjutor Bishop in 1839, but did not take effect); appointed Prefect Apostolic of the Republic of Texas in 1840 and later Bishop of Buffalo
2. Peter Richard Kenrick (1843–1847); Elevated to Archbishop

=== Archbishops of St. Louis ===
1. Peter Richard Kenrick (1847–1895)
2. John Joseph Kain (1895–1903)
3. Cardinal John J. Glennon (1903–1946)
4. Cardinal Joseph Ritter (1946–1967)
5. Cardinal John Joseph Carberry (1968–1979)
6. John L. May (1980–1992)
7. Justin Francis Rigali (1994–2003), appointed Archbishop of Philadelphia (Cardinal in 2003)
8. Raymond Leo Burke (2004–2008), appointed Prefect of the Apostolic Signatura and later Patron of the Order of Malta (Cardinal in 2010)
9. Robert James Carlson (2009–2020)
10. Mitchell T. Rozanski (2020–present)

=== Auxiliary Bishops ===
- Christian Herman Winkelmann (1933–1939), appointed Bishop of Wichita
- George Joseph Donnelly (1940–1946), appointed Bishop of Leavenworth
- John Patrick Cody (1947–1954), appointed Coadjutor Bishop and Bishop of Kansas City-Saint Joseph and later Coadjutor Archbishop and Archbishop of New Orleans and Archbishop of Chicago (Cardinal in 1967)
- Charles Herman Helmsing (1949–1956), appointed Bishop of Kansas City-Saint Joseph
- Leo Christopher Byrne (1954–1961), appointed Coadjutor Bishop and Bishop of Wichita and later Coadjutor Archbishop of St. Paul and Minneapolis
- Glennon Patrick Flavin (1957–1967), appointed Bishop of Lincoln
- George Joseph Gottwald (1961–1988)
- Joseph Alphonse McNicholas (1969–1975), appointed Bishop of Springfield in Illinois
- Charles Roman Koester (1971–1991)
- Edward Thomas O'Meara (1972–1979), appointed Archbishop of Indianapolis
- John Nicholas Wurm (1976–1981), appointed Bishop of Belleville
- Edward Joseph O'Donnell (1983–1994), appointed Bishop of Lafayette
- James Terry Steib (1983–1993), appointed Bishop of Memphis
- Paul Albert Zipfel (1989–1996), appointed Bishop of Bismarck
- Edward Kenneth Braxton (1995–2001), appointed Bishop of Lake Charles and later Bishop of Belleville
- Michael John Sheridan (1997–2001), appointed Bishop of Colorado Springs
- Joseph Fred Naumann (1997–2004), appointed Archbishop of Kansas City in Kansas
- Timothy Michael Dolan (2001–2002), appointed Archbishop of Milwaukee and later Archbishop of New York (Cardinal in 2012)
- Robert Joseph Hermann (2002–2010)
- Edward Matthew Rice (2010–2016), appointed Bishop of Springfield-Cape Girardeau
- Mark Steven Rivituso (2017–2025), appointed Archbishop of Mobile

=== Other archdiocesan priests who became bishops ===
- Michael Portier, appointed Vicar Apostolic of Alabama and the Floridas in 1825 and later Bishop of Mobile
- Patrick A. Feehan, appointed Bishop of Nashville in 1865 and later Bishop and Archbishop of Chicago
- John Hennessy, appointed Bishop (in 1866) and later Archbishop of Dubuque
- John Joseph Hogan, appointed Bishop of Saint Joseph in 1868 and later Bishop of Kansas City
- Joseph Melcher, appointed Bishop of Green Bay in 1868 (1853 appointment as Bishop of Quincy did not take effect)
- John Joseph Hennessy, appointed Bishop of Wichita in 1868
- John Henry Tihen (priest here, 1886–1888), appointed Bishop of Lincoln in 1911 and later Bishop of Denver in 1917
- Christopher Edward Byrne, appointed Bishop of Galveston in 1918
- Mark Kenny Carroll, appointed Bishop of Wichita in 1947
- Marion Francis Forst, appointed Bishop of Dodge City in 1960 and later Auxiliary Bishop of Kansas City in Kansas
- Andrés Bernardo (Andrew Bernard) Schierhoff, appointed Auxiliary Bishop of La Paz in 1968 and later Prelate of Pando
- Luis Morgan Casey, appointed Auxiliary Bishop of La Paz in 1983 and later Apostolic Vicar of Pando
- John Joseph Leibrecht, appointed Bishop of Springfield-Cape Girardeau in 1984
- John R. Gaydos, appointed Bishop of Jefferson City in 1997
- George Joseph Lucas, appointed Bishop of Springfield in Illinois in 1999 and later Archbishop of Omaha
- Robert William Finn, appointed Coadjutor Bishop in 2004 and later Bishop of Kansas City-Saint Joseph
- Richard Frank Stika, appointed Bishop of Knoxville in 2009

== Education ==
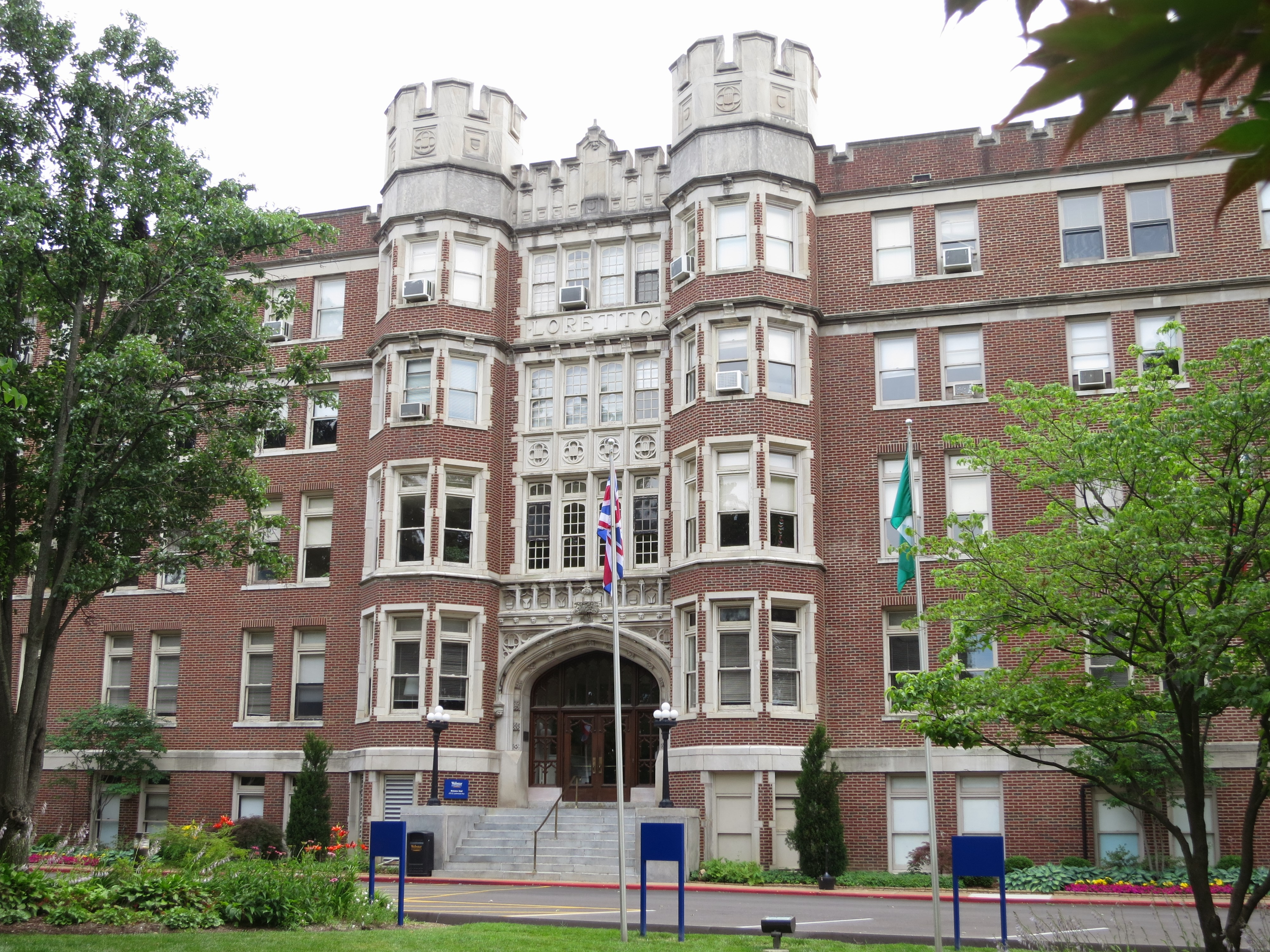
Webster University, Webster Groves, Missouri (2012)

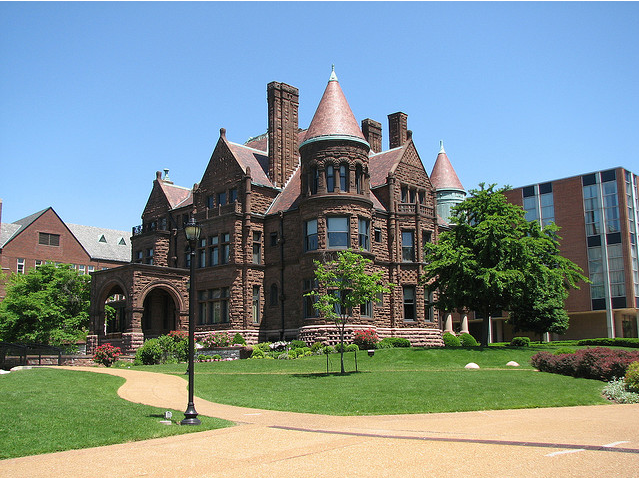
Saint Louis University, St. Louis, Missouri (2011)

The Archdiocese of St. Louis contains 97 primary schools and 25 high schools, with a total enrollment as of 2023 of 30,741.

=== High schools ===
==== Co-educational schools ====
- Bishop DuBourg High School – St. Louis
- Cardinal Ritter College Prep – St. Louis
- Duchesne High School – St. Charles
- Valle Catholic High School – Sainte Genevieve
- St. Dominic High School – O'Fallon
- St. Francis Borgia High School – Washington
- St. Pius X High School – Crystal City
- St. Vincent de Paul Jr. Sr. High School – Perryville

==== All-boys schools ====
- Chaminade College Preparatory School – Creve Coeur
- Christian Brothers College High School – Town & Country
- De Smet Jesuit High School – Creve Coeur
- St. John Vianney High School – Kirkwood
- St. Louis Priory School – Creve Coeur
- St. Louis University High School – St. Louis
- St. Mary's Southside Catholic High School – St. Louis

==== All-girls schools ====
- Cor Jesu Academy – Affton
- Incarnate Word Academy – Bel-Nor
- Nerinx Hall – Webster Groves
- Notre Dame High School – Lemay
- Rosati-Kain Academy – St. Louis
- St. Joseph's Academy – Frontenac
- Ursuline Academy – Oakland
- Villa Duchesne – Frontenac
- Visitation Academy – Town and Country

== Cemeteries ==
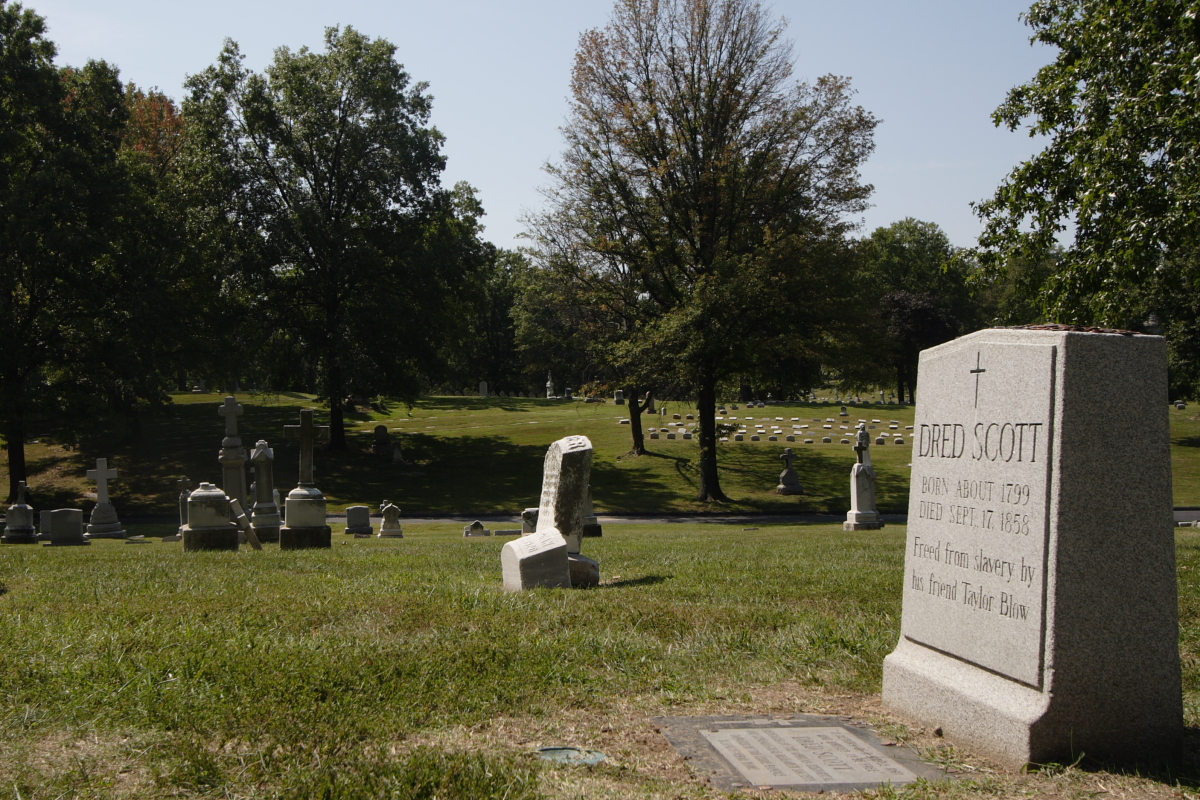
Dred Scott grave, Calvary Cemetery, St. Louis, Missouri 2007)

The Catholic Cemeteries ministry operates 17 cemeteries in the Archdiocese of St. Louis.

== Suffragan sees ==
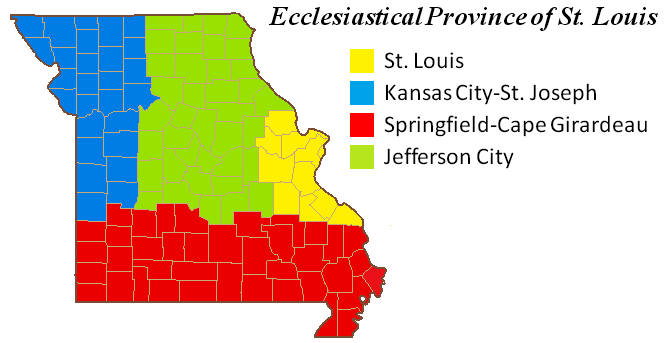
Ecclesiastical Province of St. Louis

- Diocese of Jefferson City
- Diocese of Kansas City-Saint Joseph
- Diocese of Springfield-Cape Girardeau

== Sources ==
- Bowden, Henry Warner (1993). Dictionary of American Religious Biography (2nd ed.). Westport, CT: Greenwood Press. ISBN 0-313-27825-3. Archived from the original on December 23, 2020 – via Google Books.
- Burch, Francis F. (1999). "DuBourg, Louis William Valentine". American National Biography (online ed.). New York: Oxford University Press. doi:10.1093/anb/9780198606697.article.0800407. (subscription required)
- Clarke, Richard H. (1872). "Most Rev. William Louis Dubourg, D.D.". Lives of the Deceased Bishops of the Catholic Church in the United States. Vol. 1. New York: P. O'Shea. pp. 205–238. OCLC 809578529 – via Internet Archive.
- Rice, C. David (1999). "DuBourg, Louis William (1766–1833)". In Christensen, Lawrence O.; Foley, William E.; Kremer, Gary R.; Winn, Kenneth H. (eds.). Dictionary of Missouri Biography. Columbia, MO: University of Missouri Press. pp. 258–259. ISBN 0-8262-1222-0. Archived from the original on December 23, 2020 – via Google Books.
