= John J. Glennon =

American Catholic cardinal (1862–1946)

His Eminence John Joseph Glennon
- Cardinal, Archbishop of St. Louis
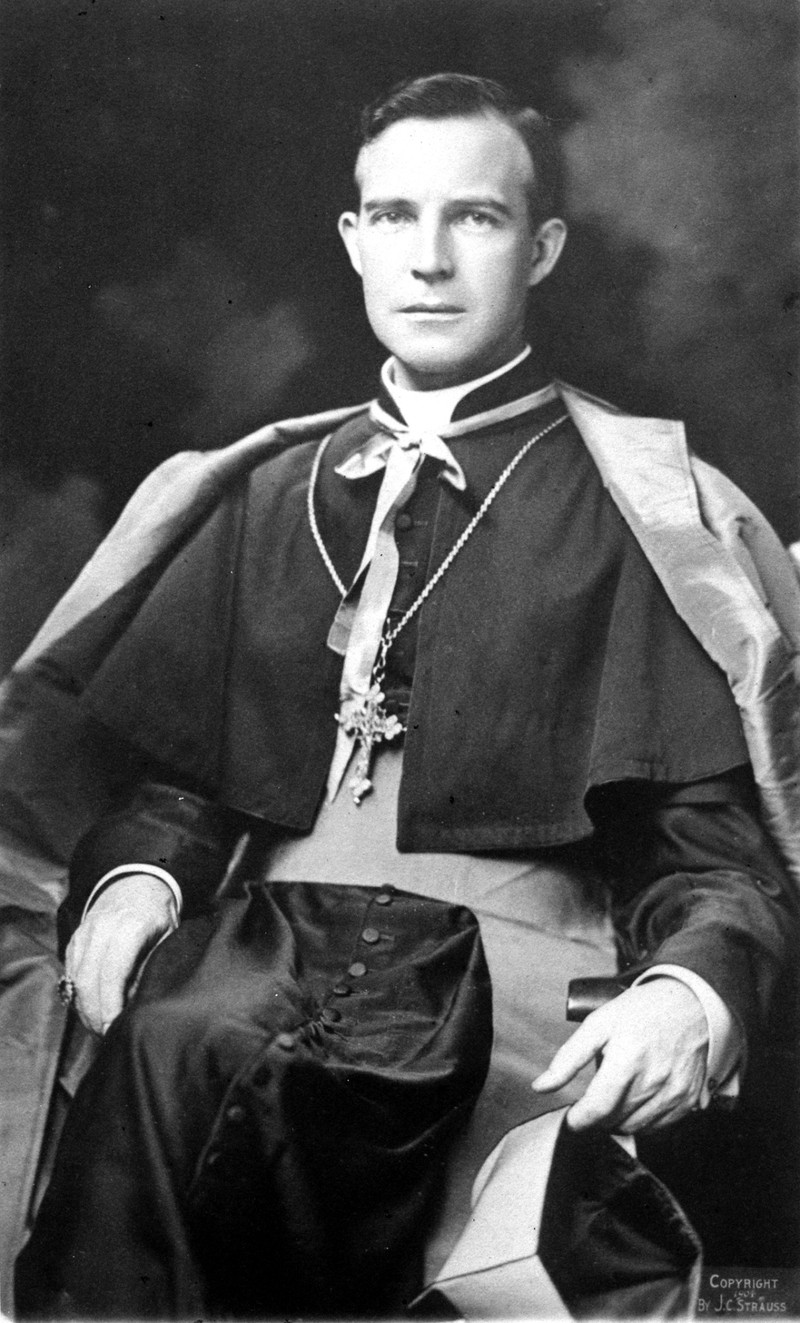
- Cardinal Glennon
- See: St. Louis
- Appointed: April 27, 1903 (Coadjutor)
- Installed: October 13, 1903
- Term ended: March 9, 1946
- Predecessor: John Joseph Kain
- Successor: Joseph Ritter
- Other post: Cardinal-Priest of S. Clemente
- Previous posts: Coadjutor Archbishop of St. Louis (April–October 1903); Coadjutor Bishop of Kansas City (1896-1903)

Personal details
- Born: June 14, 1862 Kinnegad, Ireland
- Died: March 9, 1946 (aged 83) Dublin, Ireland
- Motto: Perennis crux fidelis lux (Faithful cross, everlasting light)

Ordination history of John J. Glennon
History
Priestly ordination
- Ordained by: John Joseph Hogan
- Date: December 20, 1884
Episcopal consecration
- Principal consecrator: John Joseph Kain
- Co-consecrators: Maurice Francis Burke, John Joseph Hennessy
- Date: June 29, 1896
Cardinalate
- Elevated by: Pope Pius XII
- Date: February 18, 1946
Episcopal succession
Bishops consecrated by John J. Glennon as principal consecrator
- Thomas Francis Lillis: March 14, 1910
- Christopher Edward Byrne: November 10, 1918
- Francis Gilfillan: November 8, 1922
- Christian Herman Winkelmann: November 30, 1933
- Paul Clarence Schulte: September 21, 1937
- George Joseph Donnelly: April 23, 1940

Styles of John Joseph Glennon
- Reference style: His Eminence
- Spoken style: Your Eminence
- Religious style: Cardinal
- Informal style: Cardinal
- See: St. Louis

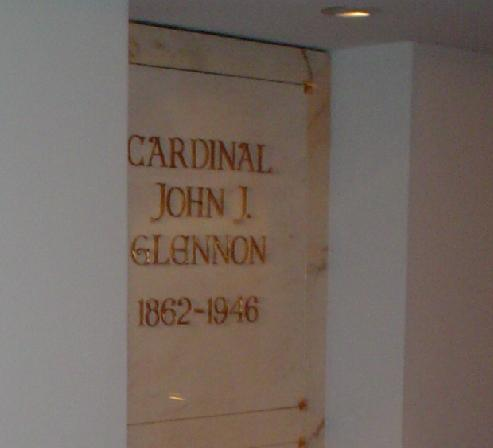
Cardinal Glennon tomb (2004)

John Joseph Glennon (June 14, 1862 – March 9, 1946) was an American Catholic prelate who served as Archbishop of St. Louis from 1903 until his death in 1946. He was elevated to the cardinalate in 1946.

== Early life and ministry ==
John Glennon was born in Kinnegad, County Westmeath, Ireland, to Matthew and Catherine (née Rafferty) Glennon. After graduating from St. Finian's College, he entered All Hallows College near Dublin in 1878. He accepted an invitation from Bishop John Joseph Hogan in 1882 to join the newly erected Diocese of Kansas City in the United States. Glennon, after arriving in Missouri in 1883, was ordained to the priesthood by Hogan for the Diocese of Kansas City in the Cathedral of the Immaculate Conception in Kansas City, Missouri, on December 20, 1884.

After his ordination, the diocese assigned Glennon as a curate at St. Patrick's Parish in Kansas City. He later returned to Europe, furthered his studies at the University of Bonn in the German Empire. Upon his return to Kansas City, Glennon was named rector of the Cathedral of the Immaculate Conception. He was later named vicar general of the archdiocese (1892) and was appointed apostolic administrator (1894).

== Episcopal career ==
=== Coadjutor Bishop of Kansas City ===
On March 14, 1896, Glennon was appointed coadjutor bishop of Kansas City and titular bishop of Pinara by Pope Leo XIII. He received his episcopal consecration on June 29, 1896, from Archbishop John Joseph Kain, with Bishops Maurice Francis Burke and John Joseph Hennessy serving as co-consecrators. At age 34, he became one of the youngest bishops in the world. However, he never succeeded to bishop in the diocese.

=== Archbishop of St. Louis ===
Glennon was named coadjutor Archbishop of St. Louis on April 27, 1903. He succeeded Kain as the third archbishop of St. Louis upon the latter's death on October 13, 1903. Realizing the Cathedral of St. Louis could no longer accommodate its growing congregation, Glennon quickly began raising funds for a new cathedral, the cornerstone of which he laid on October 18, 1908.

Glennon opened the new Kenrick Seminary in 1915, followed by the minor seminary in Shrewsbury. He delivered the eulogy at the funeral of Cardinal James Gibbons in March 1921, and was appointed an assistant at the pontifical throne by the Vatican in June 1921.

On opening day for Major League Baseball, Glennon on several occasions threw the traditional first pitch at Sportsman's Park in St. Louis for the St. Louis Cardinals However, he did not play any sports, once saying, "I once tried golf, but I so disfigured the scenery that I never played again, in fear of public indignation and reprisal."

In 1926, Italian dictator Benito Mussolini bestowed the Order of the Crown of Italy on Glennon, praising him as a sympathetic voice for Italy in the United States.

== Cardinalate and death ==
=== College of Cardinals ===
On December 24, 1945, the Vatican announced that it was elevating the 83-year-old Glennon to the College of Cardinals. Glennon originally thought himself too old to make the journey to Rome for the ceremony, plus he was suffering from bronchitis. However, he decided to fly to Europe rather than go by ship, joining fellow Cardinals-elect Francis Spellman and Thomas Tien Ken-sin. Pope Pius XII created Glennon as cardinal priest of Basilica of Saint Clement in Rome during the consistory of February 18, 1946. Glennon felt too weak to participate in some of the rituals.

=== Death ===
Before flying back to the United States from Ireland, Glennon's aides persuaded him to stay in Ireland for a week to regain his health. On March 7th, he felt strong enough to attend a dinner with Irish President Seán T. O'Kelly and Taoiseach Éamon de Valera. However, within 48 hours, his bronchitis had progressed into a serious pulmonary infection. Glennon died in Dublin at the presidential residence on March 9, 1946. His body lay in state at All Hallows College and the Cathedral of Christ the King in Mullingar, Ireland for several days. It was then flown to St. Louis and interred at the cathedral.

=== Legacy ===
Glennon is the namesake of the community of Glennonville, Missouri. The only diocesan hospital for children, Cardinal Glennon Children's Hospital, affiliated with St. Louis University Medical Center, was created in his name.

== Viewpoints ==
=== Divorce ===
Glennon was an outspoken opponent of legalized divorce, saying, "The modern attitude makes a joke of the sacrament of matrimony."

=== Gambling ===
In 1936, Glennon condemned gambling games as "unworthy of our Catholic people...causing much scandal," and banned bingo games on church property.

=== Politics and war ===
On July 7, 1904, Glennon offered the invocation at the opening of the second session of the 1904 Democratic National Convention in St. Louis He opposed British rule in Ireland, and supported the leaders of the 1916 Easter Rebellion in Dublin.

Following the bombing of Pearl Harbor by Japan in 1941, Glennon declared,

"We are not a military nation, but we are at war.... Churches have a duty in time of war not to promote hatred, racial or otherwise. Churches should give their moral aid and their physical support to the nation."

=== Prohibition ===
Glennon opposed the 1919 passing of the 18th Amendment of the US Constitution, which prohibited the manufacture and sale of most alcoholic beverages in the United States. He believed that the prohibition of alcohol was contrary to the spirit of the Constitution.

=== Racial segregation ===
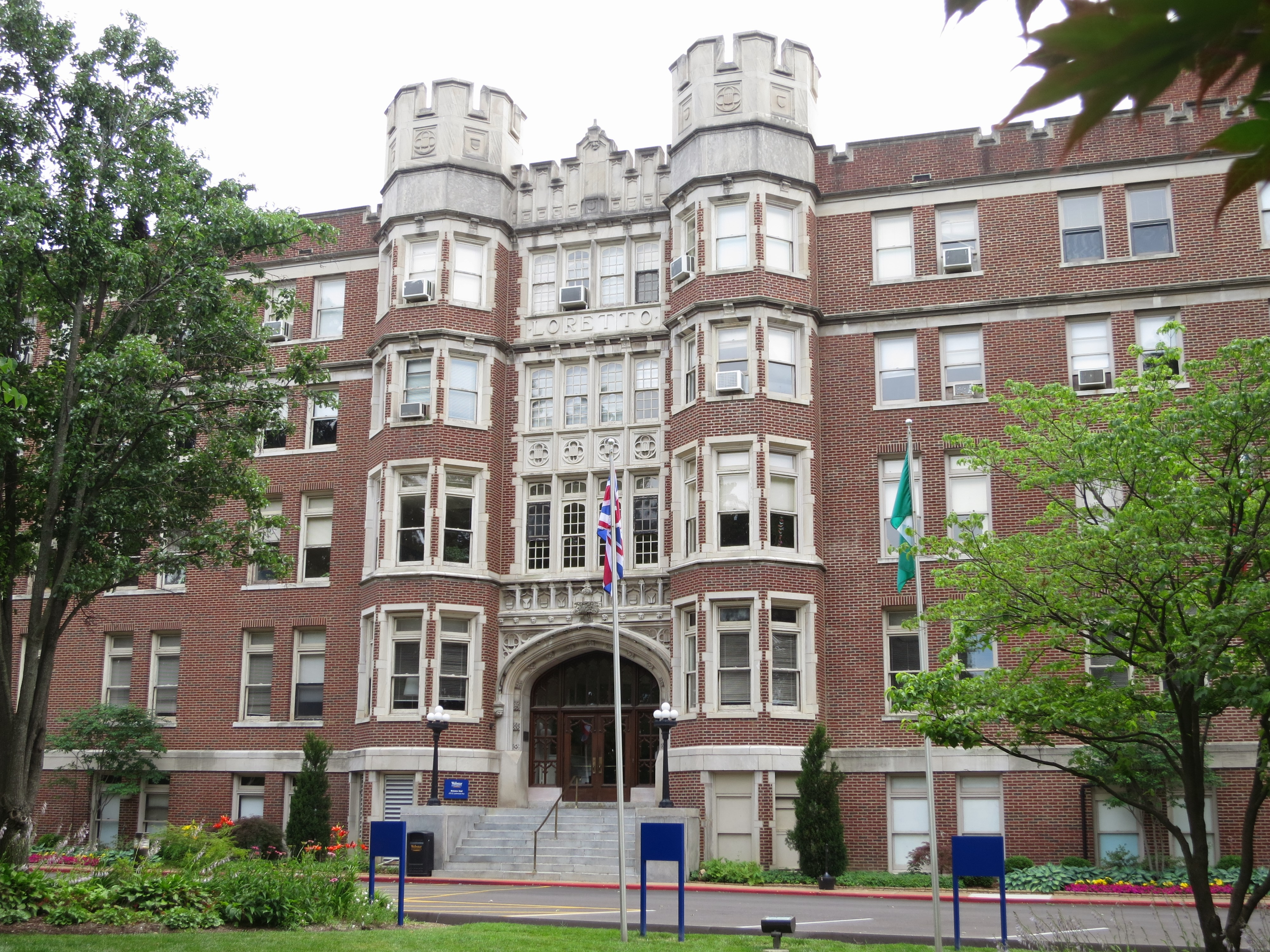
Webster University, Webster Groves, Missouri (2012)

Glennon opposed racial integration in the city's Catholic schools, colleges, and universities. During the early 1940s, many local priests, especially the Jesuits, challenged the segregationist policies at the city's Catholic schools. The St. Louis chapter of the Midwest Clergy Conference on Negro Welfare, formed locally in 1938, pushed the all-female Webster College in Webster Groves, Missouri, to integrate first. However, in 1943, Glennon blocked the enrollment of a young black woman at the college by speaking privately with the Kentucky-based superior of the Sisters of Loretto, which staffed the college.

When approached directly by pro-integration priests, Glennon called the integration plan a "Jesuit ploy," and quickly transferred one of the complaining priests away from his mission at an African-American Catholic parish. The Pittsburgh Courier, an African-American newspaper with national circulation, discovered Glennon's intervention and ran a front-page feature on the Webster incident. In response, Fr Claude Heithaus, a professor of classical archaeology at Saint Louis University (SLU), delivered an angry sermon accusing his own institution of immoral behavior in its segregation policies. SLU began admitting African-American students that summer when its president, Fr Patrick Holloran, managed to secure approval from the reluctant Glennon.

=== Socializing ===
Glennon in 1936 prohibited dancing and alcohol consumption at church-sponsored events.

=== Women's rights ===
Glennon was an opponent of women's suffrage and coeducational colleges and universities.Glennon once complained about women competing with men in the workforce, saying, "Some of the women go downtown in the race and race beside the men...It is regrettable that men have to let them, are compelled to let them."

== Sources ==
- Christensen, Lawrence O., et al. Dictionary of Missouri Biography. Columbia, Missouri University of Missouri Press, 1997. ISBN 0-8262-1222-0

Catholic Church titles
Preceded by John Joseph Kain	Archbishop of St. Louis; 1903–1946	Succeeded by Joseph Ritter
Preceded by –	Coadjutor Bishop of Kansas City; 1896-1903	Succeeded by –
