= Schlafly =

Schlafly is a surname of German-Swiss origin. People with that surname include:

- Andrew Schlafly (born 1961), American conservative activist, founder of Conservapedia, son of Phyllis
- Hubert Schlafly (1919–2011), American electrical engineer, co-inventor of the teleprompter
- Larry Schlafly (1878–1919), American baseball player
- Phyllis Schlafly (1924–2016), American conservative activist
- Thomas Schlafly (born 1948), American founder of the Saint Louis Brewery

Other entities:

- A trademarked brand name of beers produced by the Saint Louis Brewery

Not to be confused with:

- Ludwig Schläfli (1814–95), Swiss mathematician
