= Saint Louis Priory School =

Private school in Saint Louis County, Missouri, US

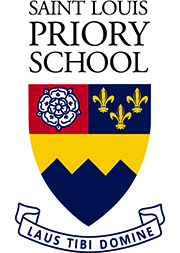

Location
- 500 South Mason Road; Creve Coeur, Missouri 63141; United States; 38.644193°N 90.478863°W

Information
- Type: Private college-preparatory school
- Motto: Latin: Laus Tibi Domine (Praise to Thee, Lord)
- Religious affiliation: Roman Catholic (English Benedictine)
- Established: 1956; 70 years ago
- Headmaster: Josh Dixon
- Faculty: 51
- Grades: 6–12
- Gender: Boys
- Enrollment: 350 (2026–27)
- Student to teacher ratio: 7:1
- Campus size: 150 acres (0.61 km^{2})
- Colors: Red and blue
- Athletics conference: Metro League
- Nickname: Ravens
- Accreditation: ISACS
- Newspaper: The Record
- Yearbook: The Shield
- Tuition: $26,700 for grade 6; $31,500 for grades 7–12
- Affiliations: MSHSAA; NAIS; NCEA; ISSL
- Website: priory.org

Saint Louis Priory School is a Catholic college-preparatory school for boys on a 150-acre campus in Creve Coeur, Missouri, within the Archdiocese of St. Louis. The school is operated by the Benedictine monks of the Saint Louis Abbey.

== History ==
The school was established in 1956, at the invitation of St. Louis Catholics, by the Benedictine monks of the Ampleforth Abbey in Yorkshire, England. The corresponding Priory of Saints Louis and Mary (now Saint Louis Abbey), a Benedictine monastery, was established in 1955. The priory, which is a member of the English Benedictine Congregation, became independent of Ampleforth in 1973, and was elevated to an abbey in 1989.

The founding prior of the abbey in St. Louis, from 1955 to 1967, was Fr. Columba Cary-Elwes, an author, monastic leader, and former titular Abbot of Westminster. The founding headmaster was scholar and author Fr. Timothy Horner, who also founded the school's first athletic team, the Rebel Ruggers.

The history of the monastery and school was chronicled in 2001 by founding monk and original headmaster Fr. Timothy Horner in his In Good Soil: The Founding of the Saint Louis Priory School 1954–1973. In this history, Horner describes the initial contact with St. Louis Catholic laymen, and explains the process of founding a new school in the English Benedictine Congregation.

As Horner notes in In Good Soil, the purpose of school, as conceived by the lay St. Louis Catholics who initiated the project, was to "offer its students a Catholic-college preparatory education of the highest excellence so as to enter the colleges, universities, and technical schools of their choice". By the middle of the 20th century, Catholics had gone to great lengths to develop their own educational system and were expected to support it, so the fact that the school was founded with a view to sending its alumni to non-Catholic colleges was something of a departure for the time.

In the 2025–26 school year, Priory added a 6th grade program, called Form A.

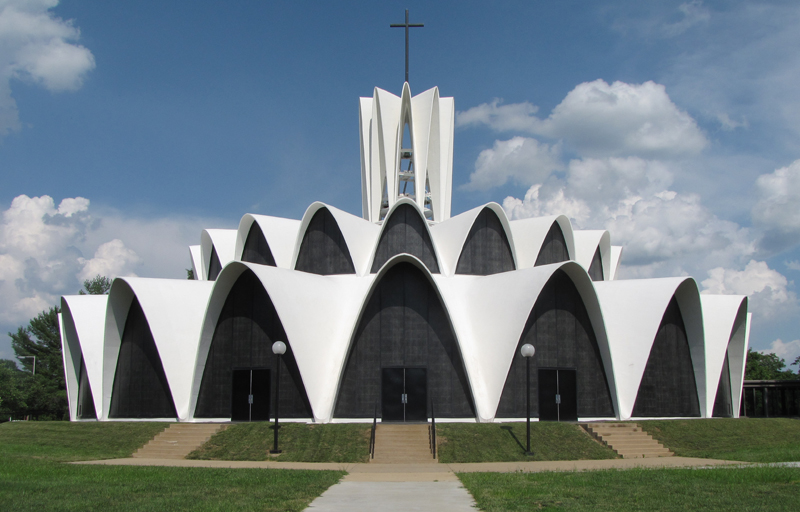
The Abbey Church on the campus shared by Saint Louis Priory School, Saint Louis Abbey, and St. Anselm Parish.

== Academics ==
Priory operates on a trimester schedule and organizes grade levels using a form system, with Form A corresponding to grade 6, and Forms I–VI corresponding to grades 7–12, respectively. The curriculum includes required classes in theology for all Forms, while Latin is required for students in Forms I–III and optional for Forms IV–V. Standard classes in the humanities, mathematics, sciences, and modern languages are also required. Ancient Greek has also been offered at the school since its opening. The school offers Advanced Placement courses and advanced college credit through the Saint Louis University 1818 Program.

All students in their final year are required to complete a senior thesis or exhibition, a two-trimester research or creative project. Some theses have attracted national media attention, including a Rubik's Cube mural of St. Louis Cardinals legend Stan Musial and a baseball-throwing prosthetic arm for a student's father.

The Washington Post ranked Priory second, and the top private school, in Missouri, in its 2016 list of "America's Most Challenging High Schools". Niche ranked Priory the best Catholic high school in both Missouri and the St. Louis area in 2027, and Priory ranked sixth on the site's list of best private schools in the St. Louis area and seventh in the state. Niche also ranked it the best all-boys school in both the St. Louis area and Missouri, and the thirty-ninth best in the country.

== Athletics ==
Priory is a member of the suburban Metro League, which was reconstituted out of the former ABC League. The school is a full member of the Missouri State High School Activities Association (MSHSAA), and it primarily competes in sports sponsored by the association.

=== Mascot ===
When the school was founded, the sports mascot was the Saints. In the '60s, "under the influence of a charismatic history teacher who specialized in the Civil War", it was changed to the Rebels, referencing the Confederate States of America. Initially, this link was obvious and the students used Confederate symbols to show pride in their sports team, including a giant painting of General Beauregard on the gym walls. Over time, this link weakened and explicit symbols of the Confederacy went away. In 2020, the mascot was officially changed to the Ravens.

=== State and tournament championships ===
In the winter of 2004, the hockey team received a bid to play in the Wickenheiser Cup, a memorial tournament hosted by the Mid-States Club Hockey Association league and named for the late St. Louis Blues Center Doug Wickenheiser. Priory won the championship game at the Scottrade Center, giving the school its first state sports title since 1973. In 2007, 2022, and 2026, the hockey team also won the Wickenheiser Cup. Four times is the most by any high school in tournament history.

In the fall of 2005, Priory's varsity soccer team became the first in the sport in Missouri's high school sports history to compete for a full season with no losses or ties since MSHSAA began its state championship tournament in 1968. Led by All-American forward Jimmy Holmes, the soccer Rebels ended the season with a perfect 26–0–0 record, winning the Class 2 state title. In November 2011, the team again produced a perfect season, finishing 27–0–0 and winning the Class 2 championship with a 2–0 victory over Trinity High School. In so doing they became the only school in Missouri high school soccer history to twice post a perfect season. The soccer Rebels' team record included 24 shutouts, and they outscored opponents 107–5.

In the spring of 2007, the Priory golf team won its first state title, winning by 27 shots. The final team score was 583. The golf team again won a state championship in 2018.

A little over half a decade after establishing a lacrosse program, Priory's varsity lacrosse team won its first Missouri Scholastic Lacrosse Association state title in 2016 by defeating O'Fallon (Illinois) 7–6 in the double overtime Division II championship final.

== Student life ==
The school has over 30 listed clubs.

The Medieval Arts Guild, known officially as the Guild of St. Columbkille, offers students the opportunity to learn arts including calligraphy and stained glass. Led by the late Br. Symeon Gillette, the Guild created the Millennial Window in 2000 and the Jubilee Window in 2005, which are large stained-glass windows made of over 15,000 pieces of glass in the high school's lobby.

In 2007, Priory's mock trial team won the Missouri High School Mock Trial Competition sponsored by the Bar Association of Metropolitan St. Louis, and went on to place 4th of 40 teams at the National High School Mock Trial Championship. More recently in 2024–25, the team placed 3rd in the state competition.

The ViPrs Robotics Team, co-sponsored by Priory and the all-girls Visitation Academy of St. Louis, competes in the FIRST Robotics Competition. In 2025, the team won their regional competition and advanced to the World Championship.

Priory competes in MSHSAA-sponsored Scholar Bowl, a quiz-bowl competition, and has won a total of five state championships, including 1999, 2009, 2010, 2013, and 2024.

== Notable people ==
=== Alumni ===
==== Government and politics ====
- Carl J. Artman (1983), Assistant Secretary for Indian Affairs, United States Department of the Interior, 2007–2008
- Patrick Dowd (1986), Democratic politician and member of the Pittsburgh City Council
- John A. Heffern (1972), United States Ambassador to Armenia, 2011–2014, Principal Deputy Assistant Secretary, US Department of State Bureau of European Affairs, 2015–present
- D. John Sauer (1993), Rhodes Scholar, Solicitor General of Missouri, U.S. Solicitor General
- Andrew Schlafly (1978), founder of Conservapedia

==== Business ====
- Tom Baldwin (1974), founder of the Baldwin Group
- William K. "Billy" Busch (1978), son of Anheuser-Busch chairman and Saint Louis Cardinals baseball team owner August A. Busch Jr.
- William Donius (1977), president and CEO, Pulaski Bank
- Thomas Schlafly (1966), co-founder of Saint Louis Brewery
- David Wehner (1986), CSO of Meta Platforms

==== Sports and entertainment ====
- Matt Amato (1985), director of The Makings of You and several music videos
- Tim Convy (1998), comedian and keyboardist for the band Ludo
- Dave Holmes (1989), MTV VJ and reality TV show host
- John Klein (1983), former professional soccer player, Southeast Missouri State women's soccer coach
- Kevin Kline (1965), Academy Award-winning actor
- Benjamin R. Noll (2000), NFL offensive lineman; played for the St. Louis Rams, Dallas Cowboys, and Detroit Lions
- Patrick Schumacker (1998), co-producer of Abbott Elementary and Harley Quinn

==== Arts and sciences ====
- Mark Alan Barteau (1973), vice president of research at Texas A&M University
- John Constantino (1980), child psychiatrist and autism researcher
- Thomas L. Delworth (1976), a fellow of the American Geophysical Union who received the 2021 Bert Bolin Award for Climate research
- Eddy L. Harris (1974), author and filmmaker
- John Leonard Harris (1980), pastor, nonprofit founder (Encouragement Unlimited, Inc.), popular speaker, educator and author.
- John Keene (1983), MacArthur Fellow, writer, translator, professor, and artist

=== Faculty ===
- Columba Cary-Elwes (1955–1967), Benedictine monk, missionary, and author
- Paul Cavallini (2023–present), NHL player for the St. Louis Blues, Washington Capitals, and Dallas Stars
- Riley Swanson (2025–present), American football player and coach
- J. Augustine Wetta (2003–present), Benedictine monk and author
