= Thompson Coburn =

US law firm

Thompson Coburn LLP
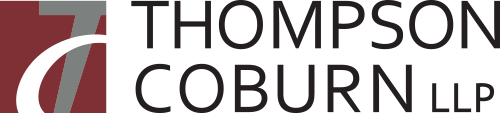
- No. of offices: 8
- No. of attorneys: >400 (2024)
- Major practice areas: General practice
- Key people: Chris Hohn (chair); Allen Capdeboscq Jr. (COO)
- Revenue: $286M (2024)
- Date founded: 1929
- Company type: LLP
- Website: www.thompsoncoburn.com

Thompson Coburn LLP is an American law firm with offices in Chicago, Dallas, Los Angeles, New York, Southern Illinois, St. Louis, Birmingham, and Washington, D.C. The firm has been especially active in the field of product liability.

== History ==
The firm was founded in 1929 and became known as Thompson Coburn in 1996 through the merger of two St. Louis firms, Thompson & Mitchell and Coburn & Croft. In July 2007 Thompson Coburn merged with Fagel Haber of Chicago. In 2013, the firm merged with Los Angeles-based Freedman Weisz LLP and opened an office in Los Angeles.

In July 2020, Roman Wuller succeeded Tom Minogue as chairman. In July 2021, Thompson Coburn combined with Hahn & Hessen and opened a new office in New York. The Hahn & Hessen addition expanded the firm's capabilities in representing financial institutions and other financial market participants in commercial finance, bankruptcy, workouts, and complex litigation.

As of 2024 Thompson Coburn had about 400 employees. In November the firm was sued in a class action for its role in a data breach with its client Presbyterian Healthcare Services.

== Community involvement ==
- Thompson Coburn was the first major law firm in Missouri to support a bill extending basic workplace protections to members of the LGBT community.
- Thompson Coburn represented the Boys & Girls Clubs of Greater St. Louis pro bono in a $30 million EPA settlement to clean up 10-acre Superfund site in St. Louis.
- Thompson Coburn is a sponsor of Street law, a pipeline program with the Association of Corporate Counsel that introduces high school students to possible careers in the law.

== Notable lawyers ==
- Kit Bond, former governor of Missouri and U.S. senator from Missouri (joined immediately after leaving the Senate in 2010)
- Robin Carnahan, Missouri secretary of state, administrator of the General Services Administration, worked for predecessor firm Thompson & Mitchell prior to her political career.
- John Cullerton, member and president of the Illinois Senate, is a partner in the firm.
- Thomas Eagleton, U.S. senator from Missouri and one-time vice presidential candidate, became a partner in the firm after the end of his Senate career.
- Thomas Schlafly, partner, is also co-founder of Schlafly Beer.
- Louis Susman, U.S. ambassador to the United Kingdom, was a partner at the firm.
- Donald J. Stohr, longtime judge for the United States District Court for the Eastern District of Missouri

== Notable cases ==
Some of the firm's notable cases include, but aren't limited to:

- Northwest, Inc. v. Ginsberg, No. 12-462 (Counsel of Record for Amicus International Air Transport Association) (preemption of state law and regulation under Airline Deregulation Act) (decided Apr. 2, 2014, 572 U.S. 273)
- Bowman v. Monsanto Company, et al., No. 11-796 (Co-counsel for Respondent and Counsel below) (enforceability of patent rights after sale) (decided May 13, 2013, 569 U.S. 278)
- Norfolk Southern Ry. Co. v. Sorrell, No. 05–746 (Co-counsel for Petitioner and Counsel below) (standards of causation and negligence under the Federal Employers’ Liability Act) (decided Jan. 10, 2007, 549 U.S. 158)
- Federal Maritime Commission v. South Carolina State Ports Authority, No. 01-46 (Counsel of Record for Respondent and Counsel below) (Federal regulatory proceedings and State sovereign immunity) (decided May 28, 2002, 535 U.S. 743)
