= Ben Noll =

American football player (born 1981)

No. 60
- Position: Guard

Personal information
- Born: November 14, 1981 (age 44); Minneapolis, Minnesota, U.S.
- Listed height: 6 ft 4 in (1.93 m)
- Listed weight: 315 lb (143 kg)

Career information
- High school: Saint Louis Priory (Creve Coeur, Missouri)
- College: Penn
- NFL draft: 2004: undrafted

Career history
- St. Louis Rams (2004)*; Dallas Cowboys (2004–2005); St. Louis Rams (2005); Detroit Lions (2006–2008)*
- * Offseason or practice squad member only

Awards and highlights
- All-Ivy (2003); Second-team All-Ivy (2002)

Career NFL statistics
- Games played: 5
- Games started: 1
- Stats at Pro Football Reference

Benjamin Richard Noll (born November 14, 1981) is an American former professional football player who was a guard in the National Football League (NFL) for the Dallas Cowboys, St. Louis Rams and Detroit Lions. He played college football for the Penn Quakers.

== Early life ==
Noll attended Saint Louis Priory School in St. Louis, where he played right guard. As a junior, he earned All-metro honors. As a senior, he helped his team win the state championship, while earning All-league, All-metro and All-state honors. He also practiced basketball and was a member of the school's rugby club.

== College career ==
Noll played football scholarship for the University of Pennsylvania while an undergraduate studying at the Wharton School of Business. As a true freshman, he appeared in 10 games as a backup. As a sophomore, he appeared in 10 games. As a junior, he started 10 games at right tackle.

As a senior, he played on an offensive line that featured five seniors (Noll, Chris Clark, Chris Kupchik, Matt Dukes and Michael Powers), helping the team achieve an undefeated season (10-0 overall). He finished his college eligibility after playing in 39 out of 40 games (20 starts).

== Professional career ==
=== St. Louis Rams (first stint) ===
Noll was signed as an undrafted free agent by the St. Louis Rams after the 2004 NFL draft on June 18. He was waived on September 5.

=== Dallas Cowboys ===
On September 6, 2004, he was claimed off waivers by the Dallas Cowboys to be the backup at right guard. He was declared inactive in 11 of the first 14 games of the season. He started in the season finale against the New York Giants, replacing Andre Gurode at right guard. He played on kickoff returns, field goal, and as a substitute guard played 413 snaps.

In 2005, he reprised the same role, after being declared inactive during the first 6 games of the season. He was released on November 30 for medical reasons.

=== St. Louis Rams (second stint) ===
On December 2, 2005, he was claimed off waivers by the St. Louis Rams, and was declared inactive for the final 4 games. He was cut on September 1, 2006.

=== Detroit Lions ===
On December 13, 2006, he was signed by the Detroit Lions to their practice squad. He was released on September 1, 2007 and re-signed to the practice squad. He wasn't re-signed at the end of the season.

== Personal life ==
After he retired, Noll moved to Nashville, where he works as a business consultant. He married on October 23, 2010. Ben's wife is an OB/GYN practicing in Nashville.
