= Cathedral Basilica of Saint Louis =

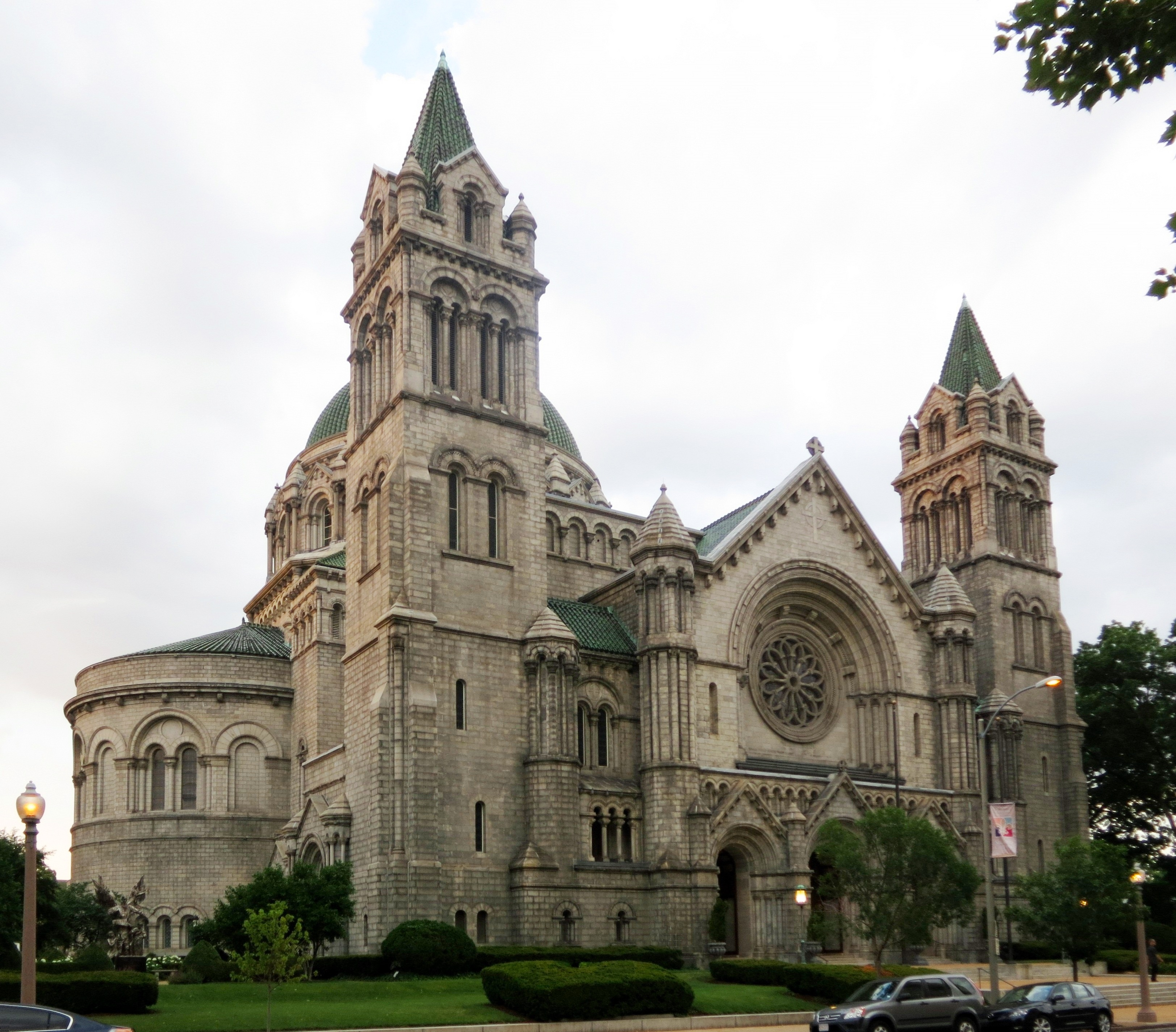

- Location in Missouri
- 38°38′33″N 90°15′17″W
- Location: 4431 Lindell Boulevard; St. Louis, Missouri
- Country: United States
- Denomination: Catholic
- Sui iuris church: Latin Church
- Tradition: Roman Rite
- Website: www.cathedralstl.org

History
- Status: Cathedral, minor basilica
- Founded: 1914
- Consecrated: June 29, 1926

Architecture
- Architect: Barnett, Haynes & Barnett
- Style: Neo-Byzantine; Romanesque Revival
- Groundbreaking: 1907
- Completed: 1914
- Construction cost: $3,000,000 (1914 dollars)

Specifications
- Capacity: 2,500 (floor seating); 5,000 (including galleries)
- Length: 365 feet (111 m)
- Width: 204 feet (62 m)
- Materials: Granite (exterior); Brick, marble, mosaic tiles (interior)

Administration
- Archdiocese: Archdiocese of St. Louis
- Deanery: South City

Clergy
- Archbishop: Mitchell T. Rozanski
- Rector: Henry J. Breier

St. Louis Landmark
- Reference no.: 57

The Cathedral Basilica of Saint Louis, also known as the Saint Louis Cathedral or the New Cathedral, is a Catholic cathedral in the Central West End neighborhood of St. Louis, Missouri. Completed in 1914, it is the mother church of the Archdiocese of St. Louis and the seat of Archbishop Mitchell T. Rozanski. The cathedral is named for Saint Louis and was designated a basilica by Pope John Paul II in 1997.

The cathedral was built as a replacement for the previous cathedral, the Basilica of Saint Louis, King of France, located along the Mississippi River. Although workers began clearing ground for the building on May 1, 1907, dedication of the cathedral and its first Mass did not take place until October 18, 1914, when the superstructure was complete. Consecration of the church took place more than a decade later on June 29, 1926. The church is known for its large mosaic installation (which is one of the largest in the Western Hemisphere), and for its burial crypts.

== History ==
Planning for the cathedral began under the authority of Archbishop Peter Richard Kenrick in the 1870s and 1880s, and a fund was created for the construction of the building by Archbishop John Joseph Kain. A formal organization promoting the new cathedral was created on April 28, 1871, and among the members of the St. Louis Cathedral Building Association were Archbishop Kenrick, Bishop Patrick John Ryan, and a variety of local businessmen. Initial site selection indicated that the new cathedral would be built on a city block bounded by 22nd and 23rd streets, and by Pine and Chestnut streets, at a location east of the actual construction site.

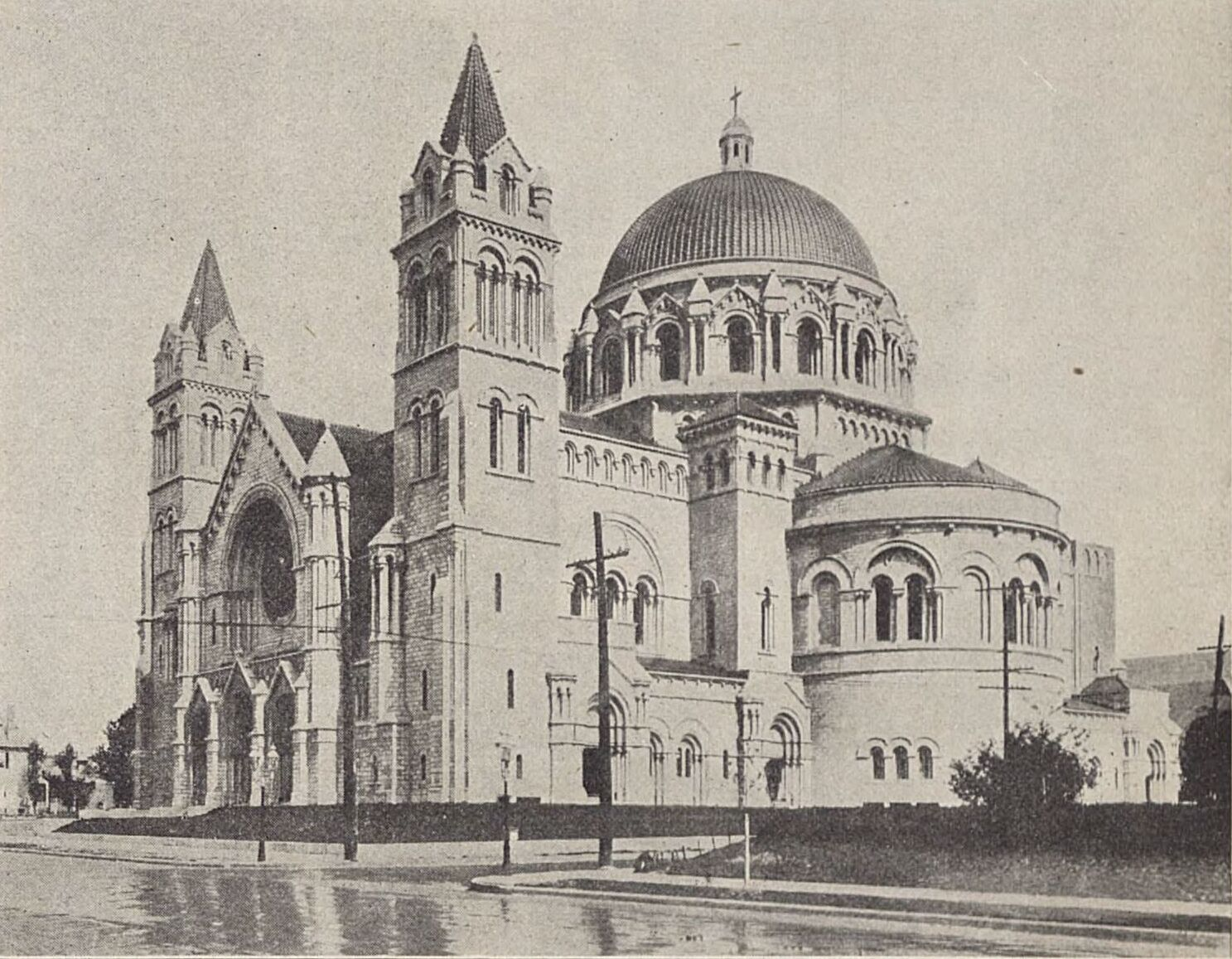
Cathedral of Saint Louis, 1917

However, the initiative for construction was only begun after the elevation of Archbishop John J. Glennon. The architecture firm of Barnett, Haynes & Barnett was selected, and Thomas P. Barnett led the design team for the project. A ceremony was conducted on May 1, 1907, for the groundbreaking of the site, and a formal laying of the building's cornerstone took place on October 18, 1908. By 1914, enough of the building was complete for a dedication ceremony, yet full consecration did not take place until June 29, 1926. Even after consecration, completion of the cathedral's mosaics was not accomplished until 1988.

The world's first known radio broadcast of a mass was from the building on Christmas 1922.

On December 20, 1943, a Solemn Pontifical Mass of Requiem was offered for Butch O'Hare, US Navy fighter pilot and Medal of Honor winner.

The grounds of the cathedral also contain the distinctive circular Chancery Building, c. 1965, designed by the Peruvian-American modernist architect Wenceslaus Sarmiento.

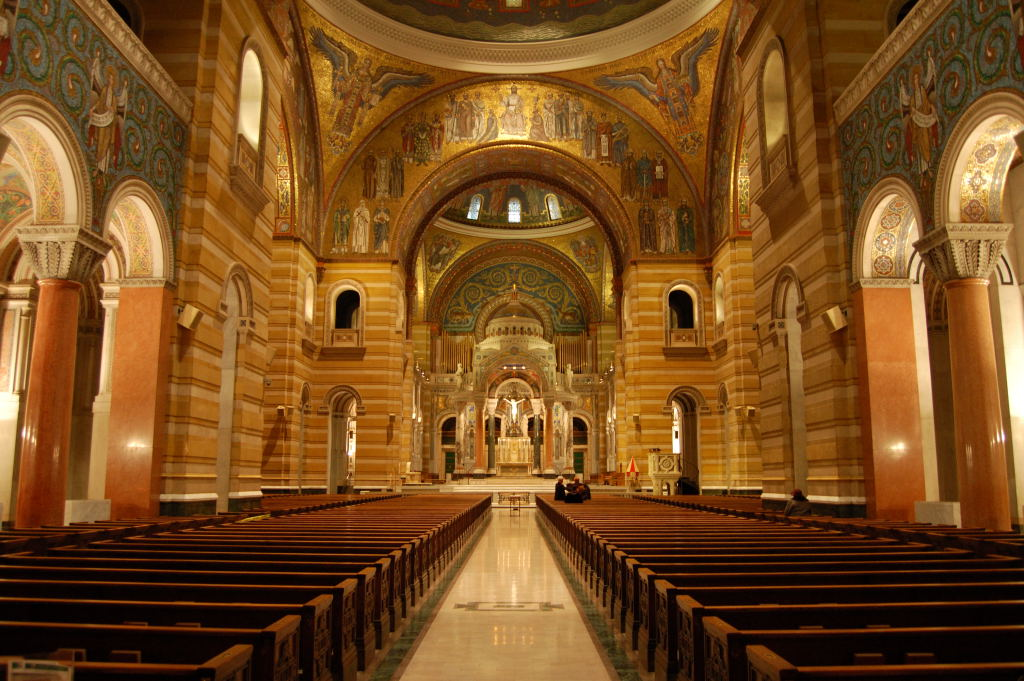
View down the main aisle

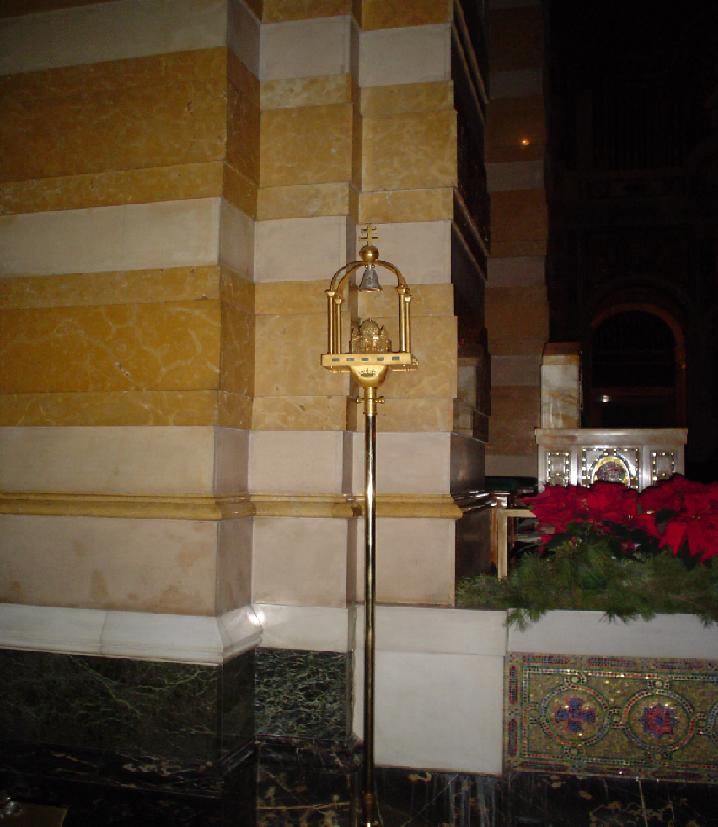
Tintinnabulum, a small bell signifying the status of the church as a minor basilica

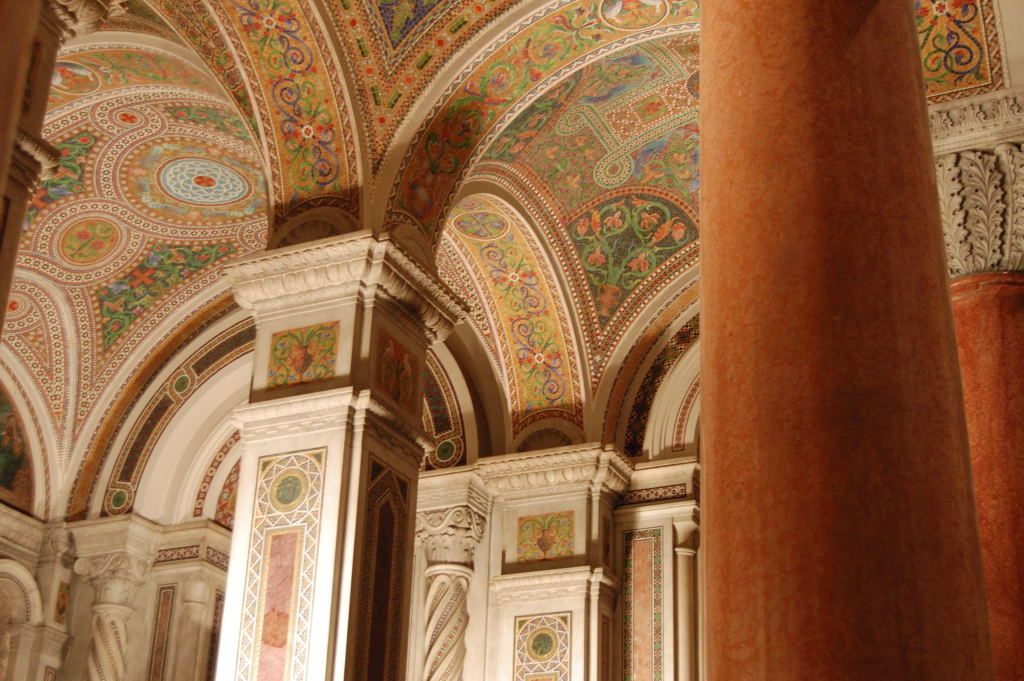
Ceiling of All Saints Chapel

== Mosaics ==
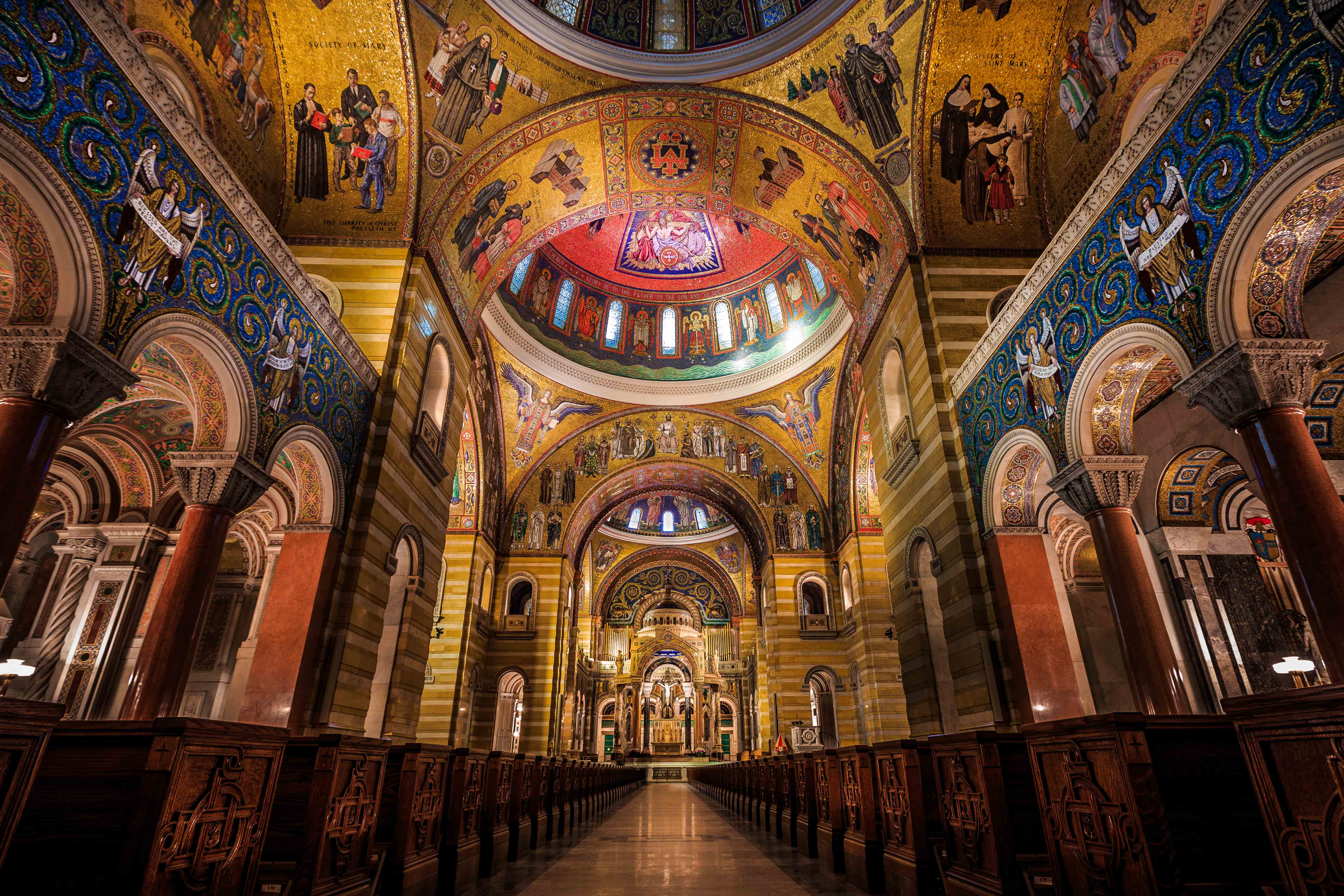
Interior of the cathedral

In 1912, installation of mosaics in the interior began. Completed in 1988, the mosaics collectively contain 41.5 million glass tesserae pieces in more than 7,000 colors. Covering 83,000 square feet (7,700 m^{2}), it is the largest mosaic collection in the world.

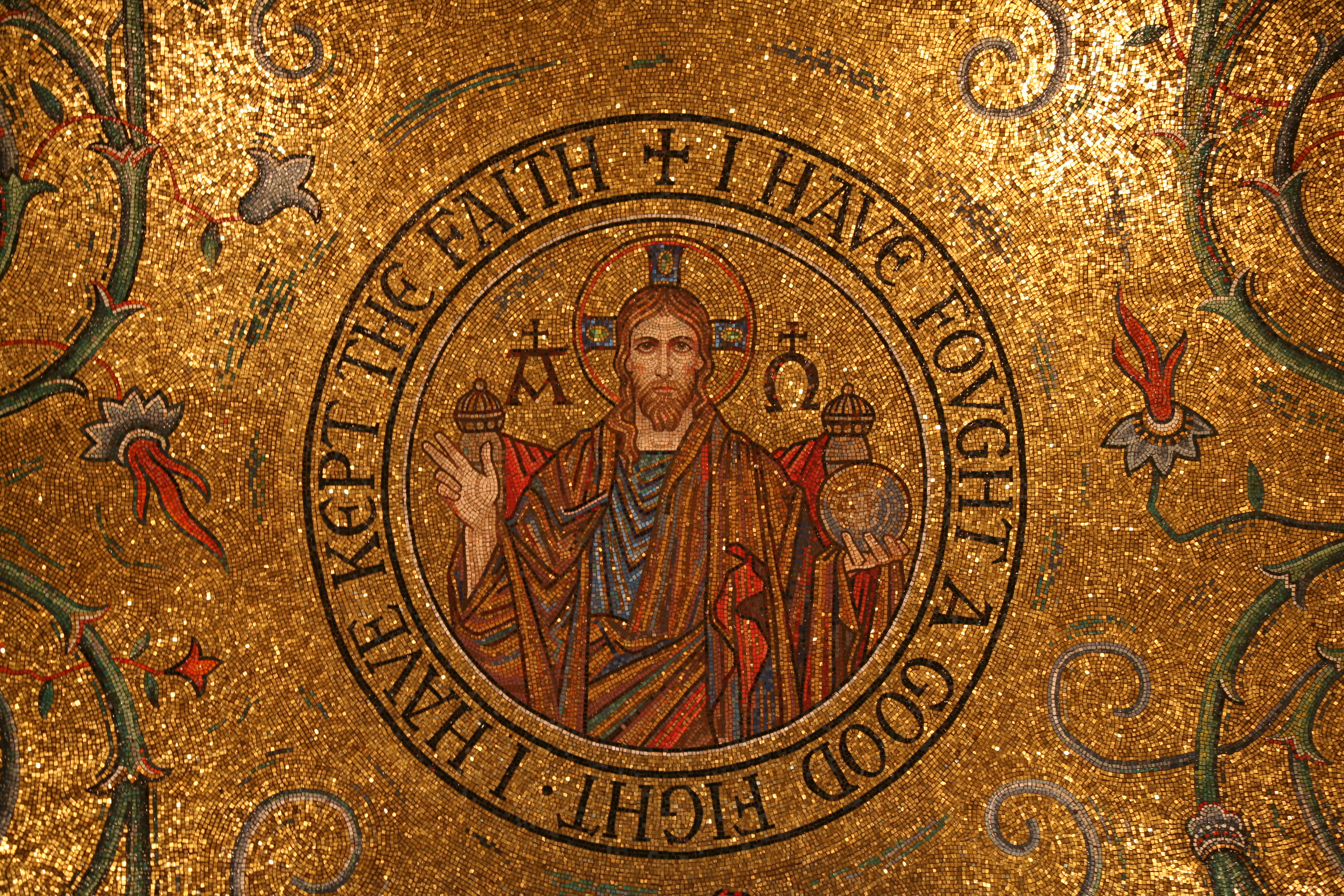
Ceiling of the narthex featuring a passage from 2 Timothy 4:7

While the mosaics in the side chapels and sanctuary walls were designed and installed by Tiffany Studios, the mosaics in the main cathedral areas were designed by August Oetken. Installation of the mosaics was completed by dozens of artisans, including Hildreth Meiere, Ravenna Mosaic, Inc., and especially the father and son team, Paul and Arno Heuduck, who worked on the mosaic for nearly their entire working lives, and Emil Frei, Inc., of St. Louis. The narthex of the church depicts the life of King Louis IX of France, namesake of the city and church, the rear dome includes mosaics of significant archdiocesan events, while the main dome by Jan Henryk de Rosen depicts Biblical scenes from both the Old Testament and New Testament.

== Crypts and museum ==
The church basement contains a museum dedicated to the mosaics in the church as well as to some of the other artifacts found within the cathedral. Also in the church undercroft is a chapel dedicated to the souls of former leaders of the Archdiocese. Currently, Cardinals John J. Glennon, Joseph Ritter, and John Carberry, as well as Archbishop John L. May, are buried in the cathedral's crypt.

== The Angel of Harmony ==
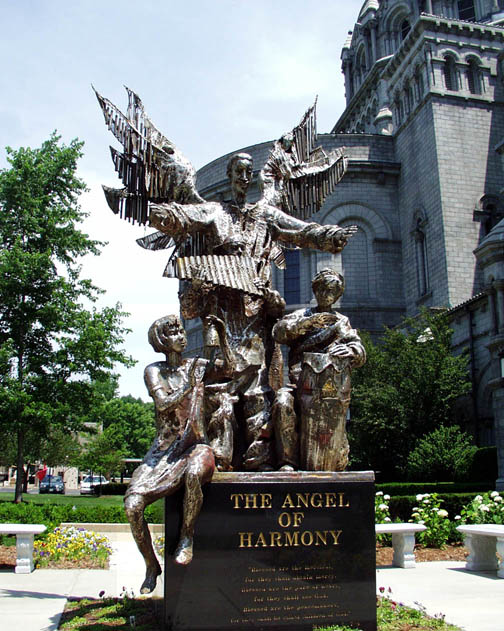
"The Angel of Harmony" by Wiktor Szostalo.

In 1999, a 14-foot high, welded stainless steel sculpture by Wiktor Szostalo was installed on the side lawn of the church. The sculpture was a gift from Adelaide Schlafly in memory of her late husband, Daniel Schlafly, a Catholic layman who was dedicated to the cause of racial justice and peace. It features a winged angel with African-American features, standing behind three children with Hispanic, Asian and European features, playing a song of peace on their instruments. The statue's base is of granite and is inscribed with quotations from the New Testament, Pope John Paul II, and Martin Luther King Jr. The sculpture emphasizes a theme of harmony, peace, and racial justice, according to Auxiliary Bishop Edward Braxton, who suggested the project to Archbishop Justin Rigali.

The statue was vandalized and destroyed by a 35-year-old man, who tampered with construction equipment being used for renovations on the cathedral on September 17, 2024. The man was arrested and being held without bond for first degree tampering, first degree property damage, unlawful use of a weapon, as he was suspected of firing into an unoccupied vehicle, and resisting arrest.

== The organ ==
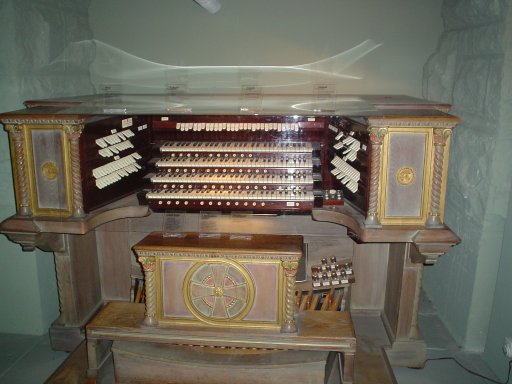
The original Kilgen pipe organ console

The cathedral has a large organ that was originally built by Geo. Kilgen and Son, Inc., in 1915. Originally, the organ had two four-manual (keyboard) organ consoles, one in the gallery with the organ, and another console behind the sanctuary. In 1946, Kilgen put a new organ into the cathedral. The 1946 organ had 77 ranks of pipes, 14 of which came from the older organ. In 1948, an Echo Organ from Carnegie Hall, New York City was installed in the cathedral. In 1984, the M. P. Moller organ company refurbished the organ.

In 1997 the Wicks Organ Company of nearby Highland, Illinois, began a restoration project. They added more ranks of pipes, which brought the organ to 96 ranks of pipes. The company also added some digital stops to the organ. A new four-manual organ console replaced the old Kilgen console behind the sanctuary, and the second gallery console was refurbished. Wicks also updated the organ's electronics.

In the winter of 2002 the gallery organ was expanded, and a new dome division of pipes was added to the organ. The final step in the project, the replacement of the original gallery console (and a smaller, two-manual console that took its place) with a five-manual console was completed in 2010. The Ragen Organ Console, named for its donor, Professor Brian Abel Ragen, was taken from St. Bartholomew's Church in New York City and completely restored. It is now possible to control every part of the organ from either the gallery console or the moveable sanctuary console.

The original Kilgen console was moved into the basement museum, and can be viewed by visitors. The gallery organ is featured on many of Saint Louis's cultural tours.

== Gallery ==
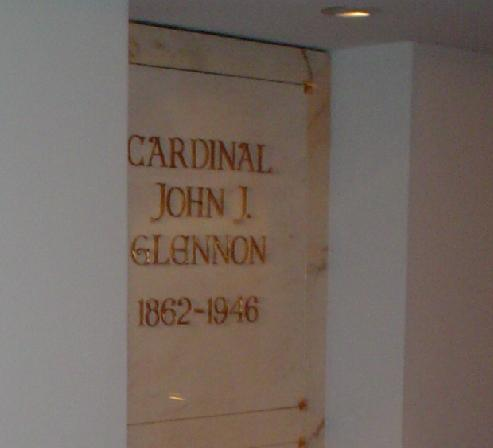
Tomb of Cardinal John Glennon in the crypt

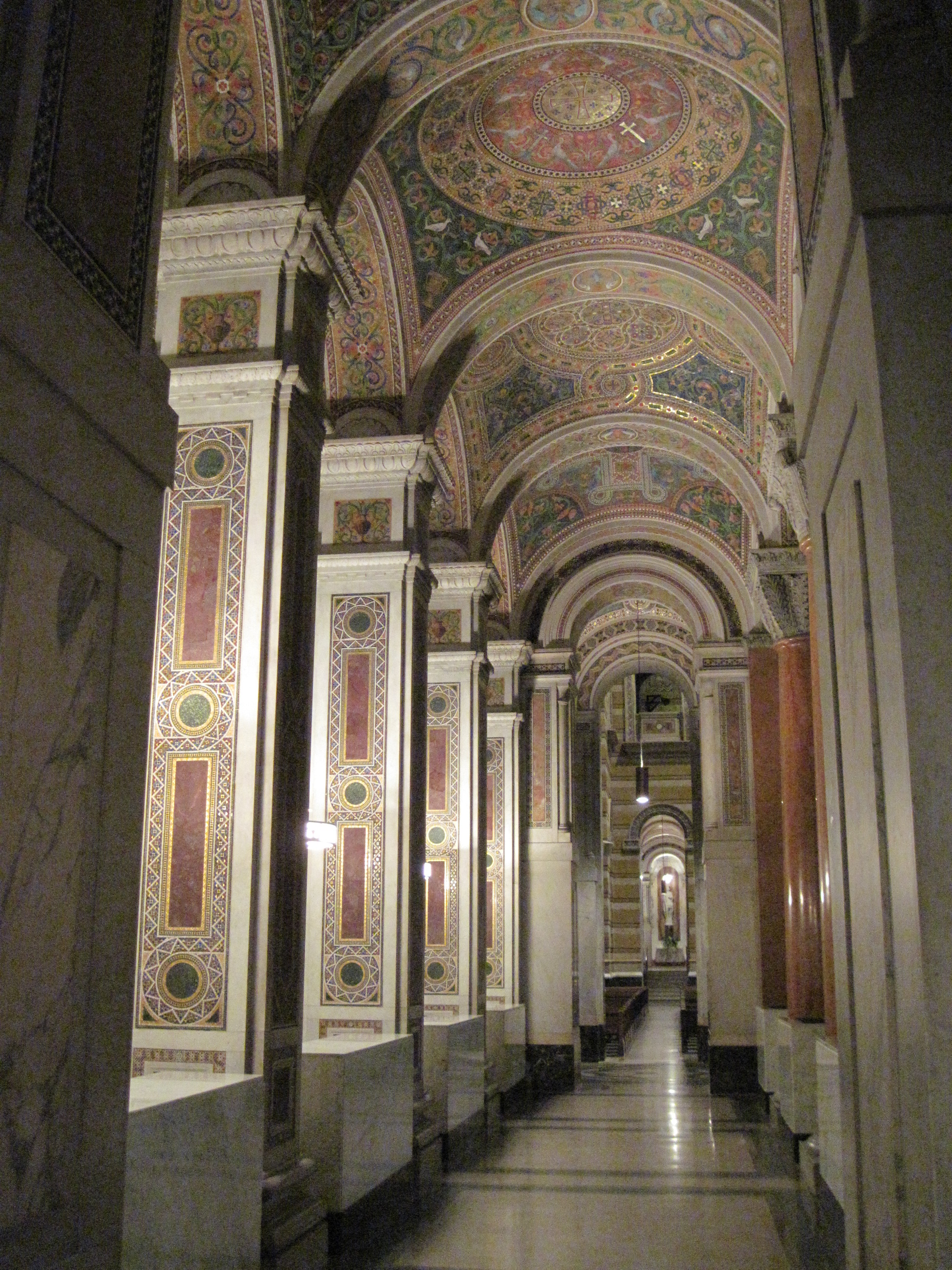
West aisle

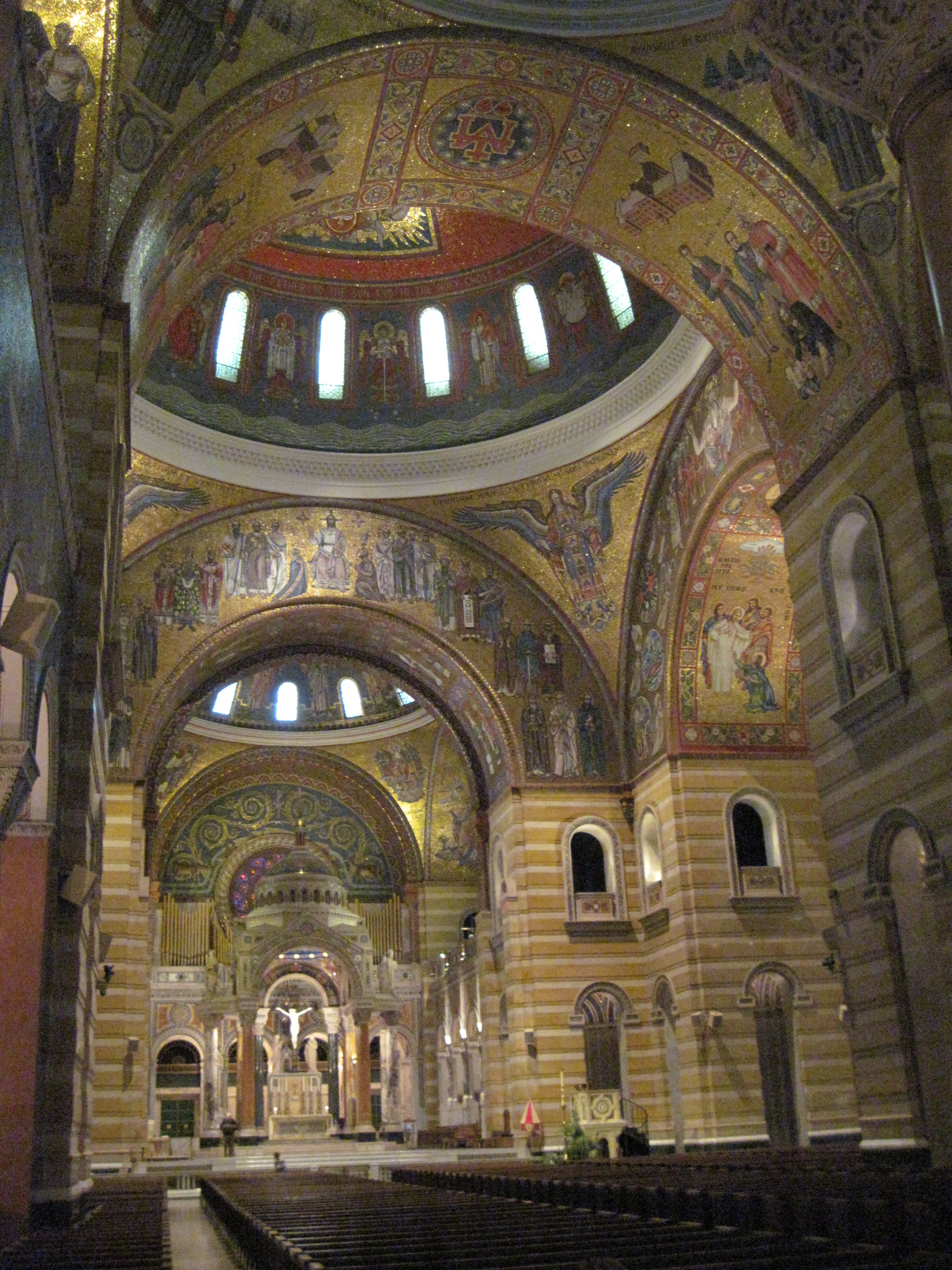
View of the crossing

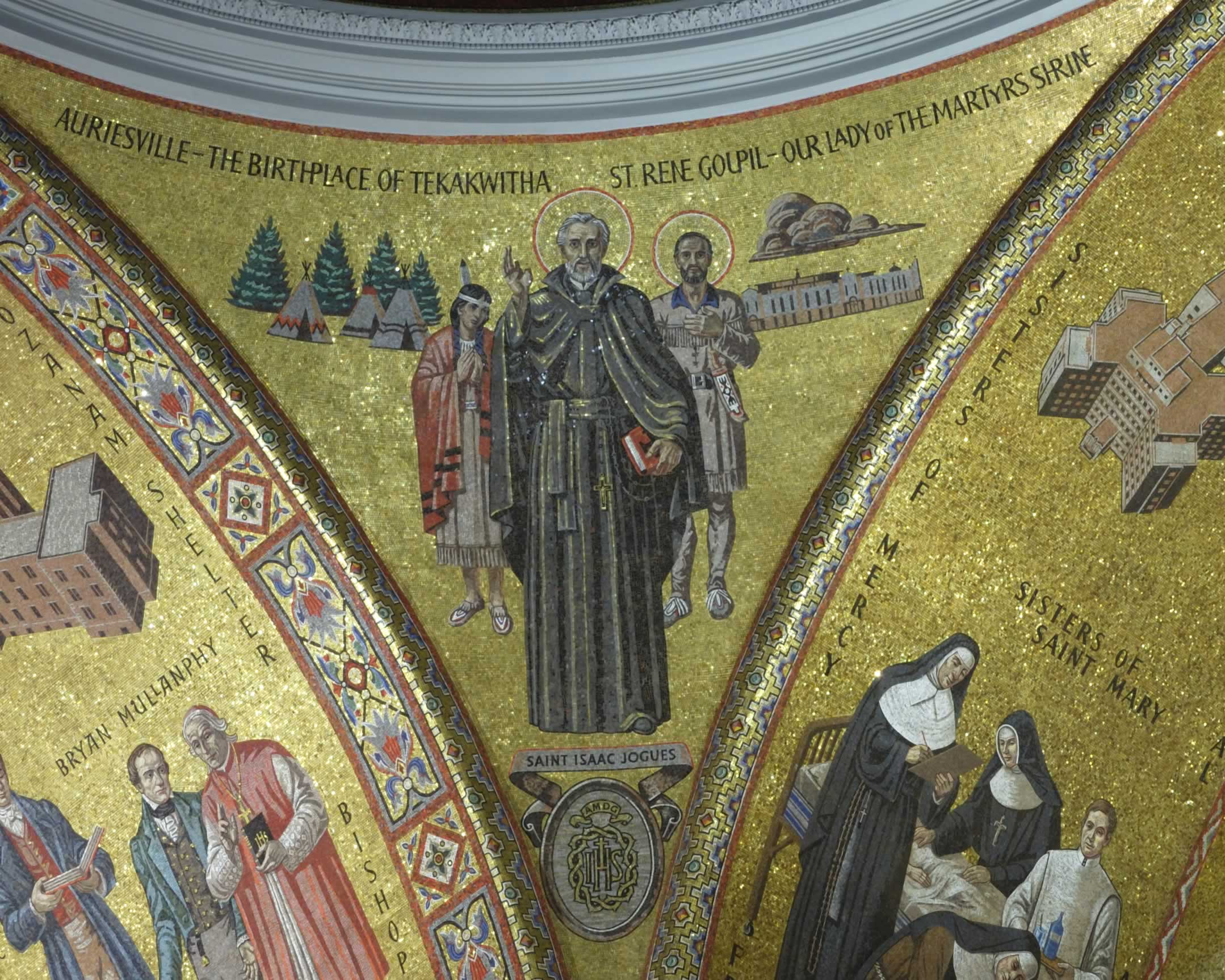
Southeast Pendentive depicting St. Isaac Jogues

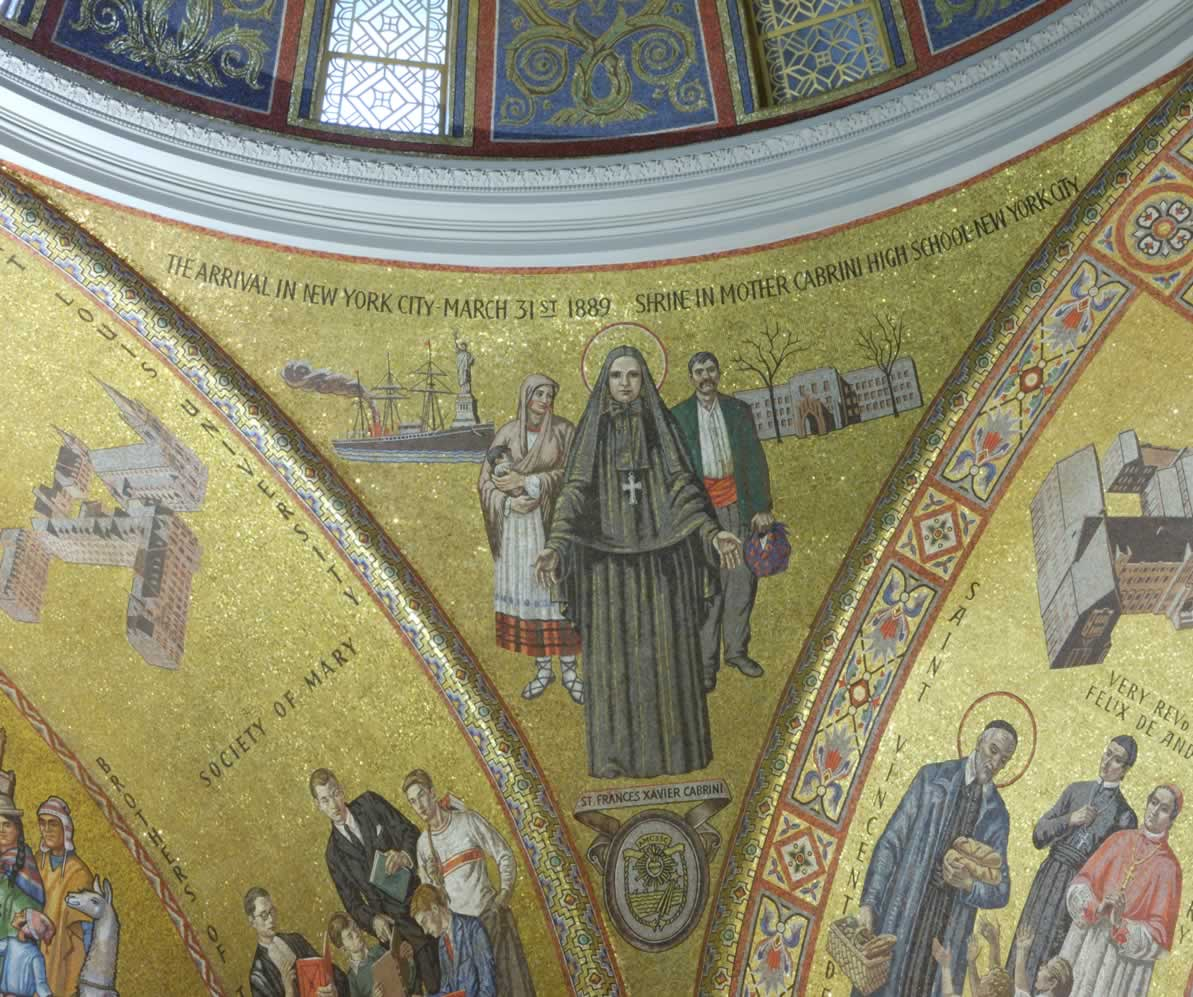
Southwest Pendentive depicting St. Frances Xavier Cabrini

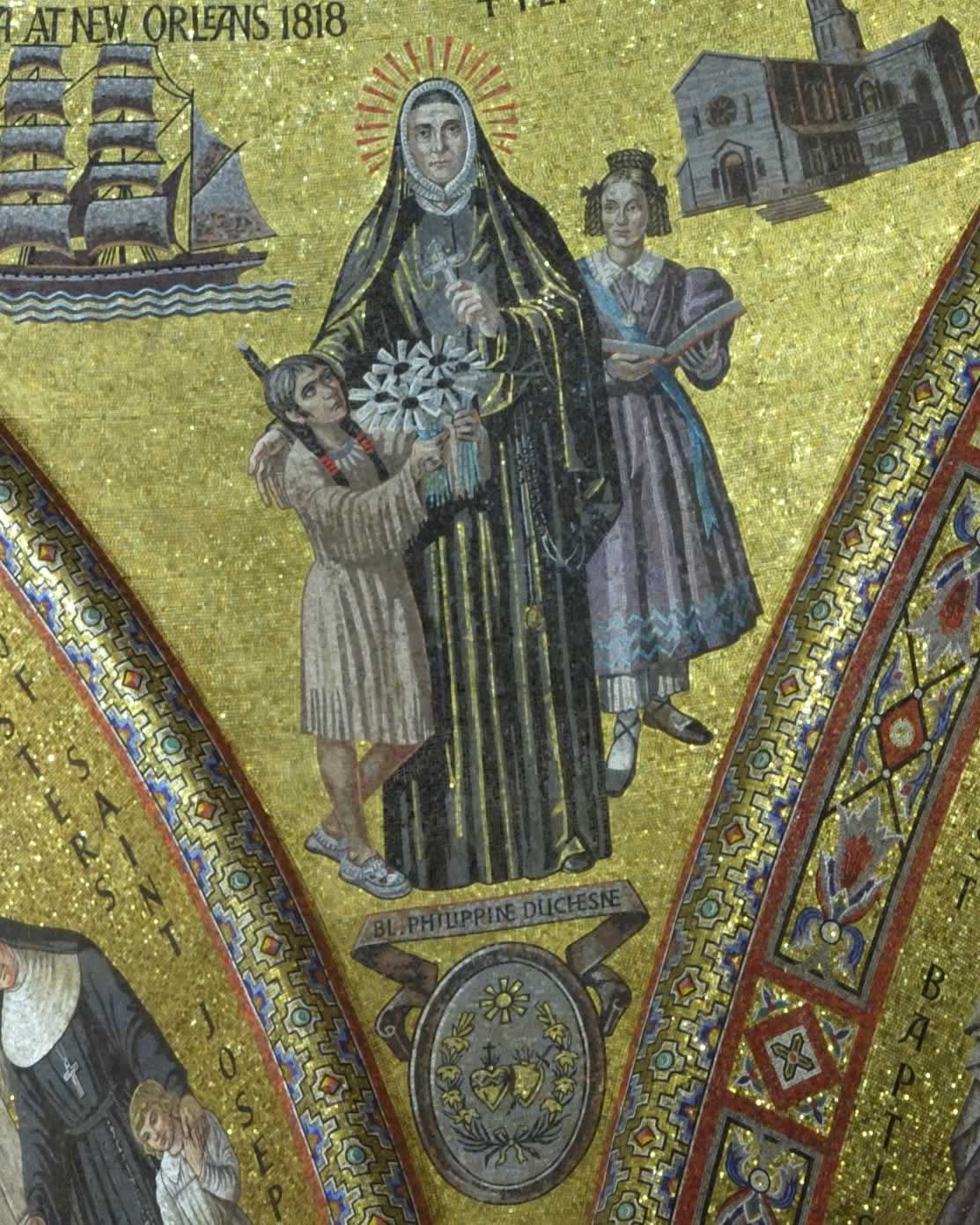
Northeast Pendentive depicting St. Rose Philippine Duchesne

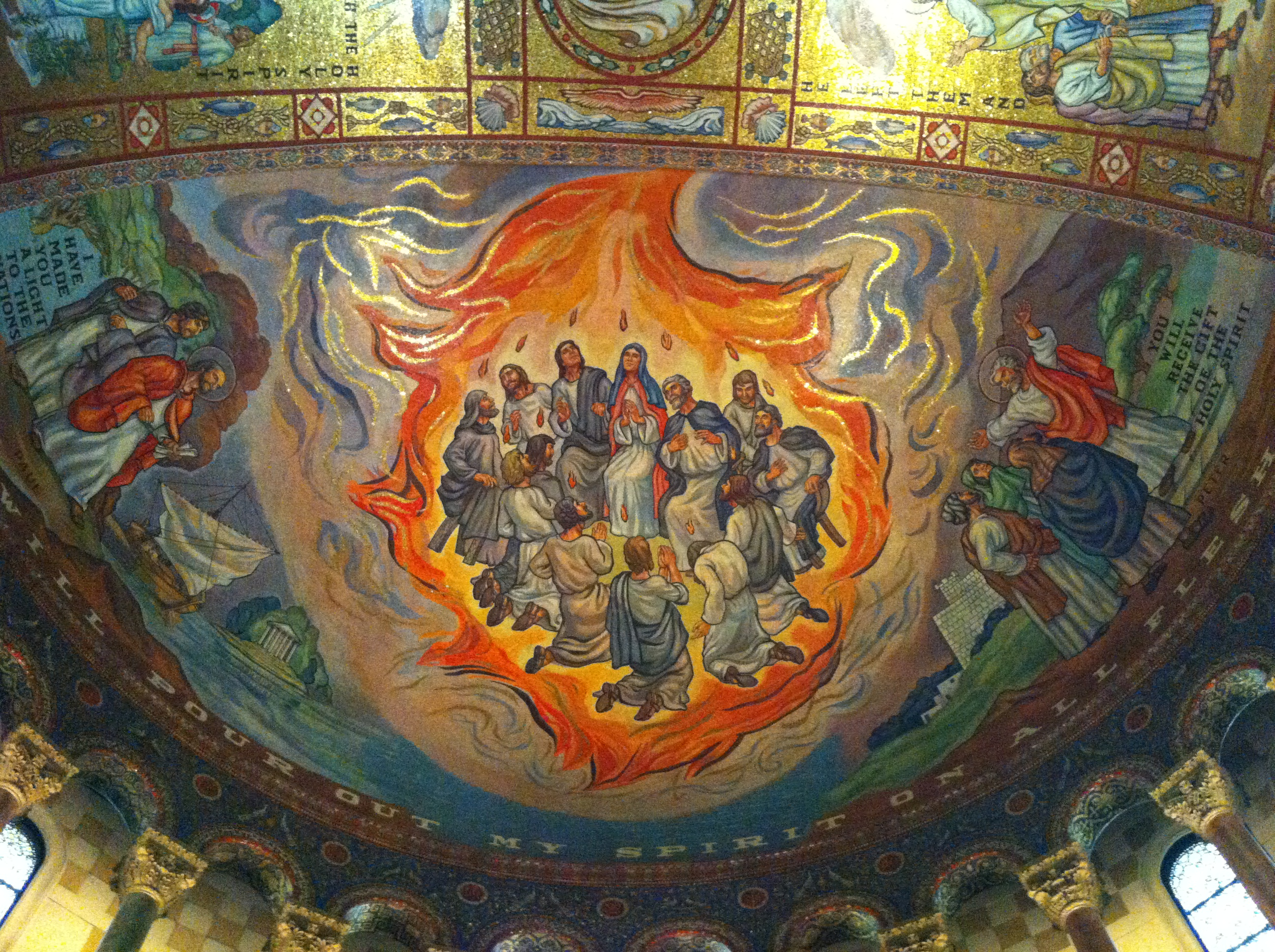
Pentecost mosaic in the west transept

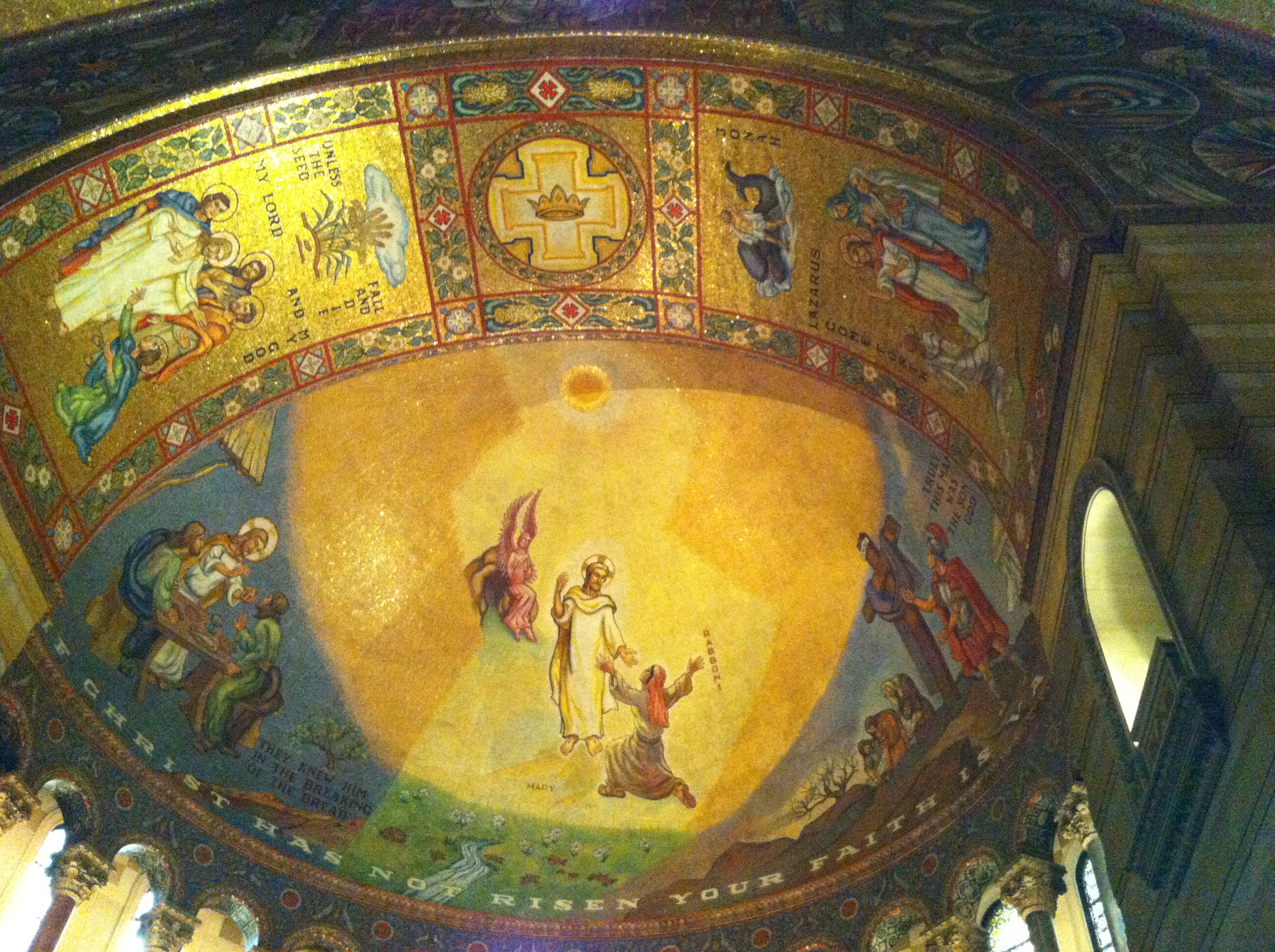
Easter mosaic in the east transept

== See also ==
- List of churches in the Roman Catholic Archdiocese of St. Louis
- List of Catholic cathedrals in the United States
- List of cathedrals in the United States
- List of tallest domes
- Mary A. Reardon
