= Catherine Wybourne =

British Benedictine nun and prioress (1954–2022)

Driana Enid Wybourne (April 1954 – 24 February 2022), professed as Sister Catherine Wybourne OSB, was a British Benedictine nun and prioress (from 2004) of Howton Grove Priory, Hereford (formerly Holy Trinity Monastery, East Hendred). She was also a well-known commentator in the British media, with an internet presence as the Digitalnun.

== Career ==
Wybourne was born in Chatham and educated at Boscombe Convent and Girton College, Cambridge, from which she graduated in 1976 with an MA in History; she subsequently carried out research in Spanish mediaeval history. She then spent three years in banking before entering Stanbrook Abbey in 1981. She subsequently wrote on the digital age and the finance sector; she was also a blogger and IT worker and wrote on faith issues more generally, especially monasticism and the Rule of Saint Benedict. She contributed a weekly column to The Universe, a newspaper for Roman Catholics in Great Britain and Ireland.

Wybourne was sometimes styled Dame Catherine Wybourne where the Dame is a title of respect used for certain Benedictine nuns, it being the equivalent to the male title, Dom.

== Death ==
Wybourne died from cancer on 24 February 2022, at the age of 67.

== Selected publications ==
- Cary-Elwes, Columba and Catherine Wybourne (1992) Work & prayer the Rule of St Benedict for lay people. Tunbridge Wells: Burns & Oates
- Wybourne, D. Catherine (2006 to 2013 editions). The Catholic Directory of England and Wales. Manchester: Gabriel Communications.
