= Wiktor Szostalo =

Polish sculptor

Saint Benedict, Welded Stainless Steel (1993) at the Saint Louis Abbey

Wiktor Szostalo (born 22 August 1952) is a Polish sculptor with studios in both Poland and the United States. He works in a variety of media, most notably welded stainless steel, wood, and bronze.

== Early life ==
Born 22 August 1952 in Pasvalys, Lithuanian SSR (Lithuania), in 1958 he moved with his parents and younger brother Józef to Kołobrzeg, Poland. From 1972-1978 he studied at the Academy of Fine Arts in Cracow, graduating with an MFA in painting and sculpture.

Szostalo was one of the founders of the Solidarity movement in Kolobrzeg and in March 1981 was elected the first Chairman of the Regional Board of "Solidarity" in Koszalin, which he represented in the 38-person National Committee headed by Lech Wałęsa. He was jailed for five months after the communist regime's crackdown on "Solidarity" in December 1981.

He left Poland in 1982 for the US, where he was granted political asylum. In 1990, he became a US citizen. He currently lives and works in both St. Louis, MO and Kołobrzeg, Poland

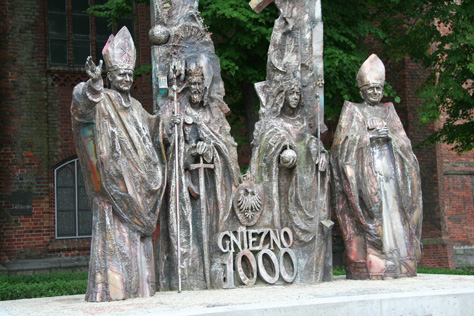
The Millennium Memorial

== Public commissions ==
Szostalo is widely recognized for his large scale public sculpture commissions. Departing from the more traditional method of bronze casting, these pieces are executed directly in welded stainless steel. They often incorporate additional elements such as cast crystal glass or carved wood. Many of these works were commissioned by Catholic churches including the "Angel of Harmony" at the Cathedral Basilica of St. Louis, the "Crucifix" at St. Elizabeth Ann Seton Church in Carmel, Indiana. , and the "Pieta" at Christ Our King Church in Charleston, South Carolina.

Other notable pieces include the "Millennium Memorial" commissioned by the city business council of Kołobrzeg, Poland, "At Long Last I got to Like Myself the Way I Am", commissioned by the Novol Corporation, Poznań, Poland, and "Team Spirit", selected by the NCAA for their headquarters in Indianapolis, Indiana.

== The Tree Hugger Project ==
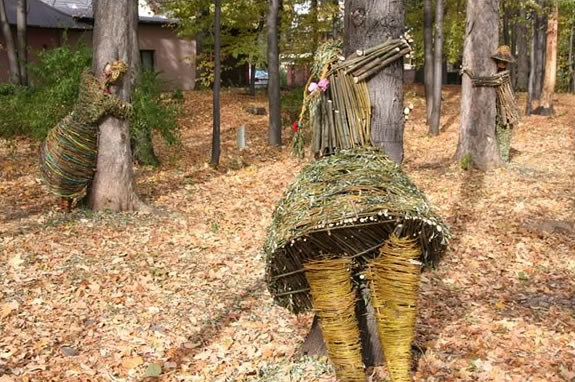
The Tree Hugger Project, installation in Wilkowice, Poland

Szostalo's Tree Hugger Project, begun in 2005, is an ongoing work of environmental art conceived along with the artist Agnieszka Gradzik. With the help of participants on site, who gather branches, twigs, vines and flowers, the artists fashion together these natural materials into groups of figures literally "hugging" trees. The artist's stated intention is to "...remind us that we humans are still very much a part of our natural surroundings".

Installations of the project are sponsored by local environmental or arts related organizations and have occurred in cities across Europe, in England, and in the United States.

An installation was sponsored by Klub Gaja in Wilkowice, Poland to celebrate International Tree Day 2006 and included an installation in Park Ujazdowski at Poland's Center for Contemporary Art.

Past installations have taken place at Washington University in St. Louis, Forest Park in St. Louis, at the Hebden Bridge Arts Festival in England, and in Stadtpark in Vienna, Austria.

In March 2007 the Tree Hugger Project was named first in a national online arts competition organized by the New York City-based organization Art For Progress, and has been invited to the 2007 Burning Man festival, which also awarded the Project a grant for the installation.

As of 2006, further installations were planned for Europos Parkas in Lithuania and the Tehran Museum of Contemporary Art in Isfahan, Iran. According to the artist's website a large installation was scheduled for 2008/9 in India, with the participation of several environmental groups from around the world, to commemorate the Chipko women. A documentary film of the Chipko Women Tribute was also planned.
