= Saint Louis Abbey =

Benedictine monastery in Creve Coeur, Missouri

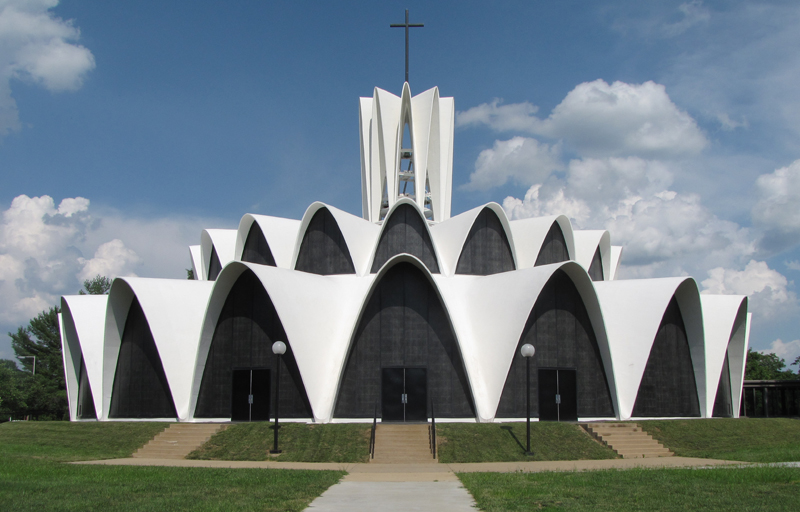
- Abbey Church
- Interactive map of Saint Louis Abbey

Monastery information
- Order: Benedictine
- Denomination: Catholic
- Established: 1955
- Mother house: Ampleforth Abbey
- Dedication: St. Louis, King of France
- Diocese: Archdiocese of St. Louis
- Controlled churches: St. Anselm's

People
- Founders: Rt. Rev. Columba Cary-Elwes; Rt. Rev. Luke Rigby; Rev. Timothy Horner
- Abbot: Rt. Rev. Gregory Mohrman

Site
- Location: Creve Coeur, Missouri
- Coordinates: 38.6442°N 90.4789°W

The coat of arms of the abbey

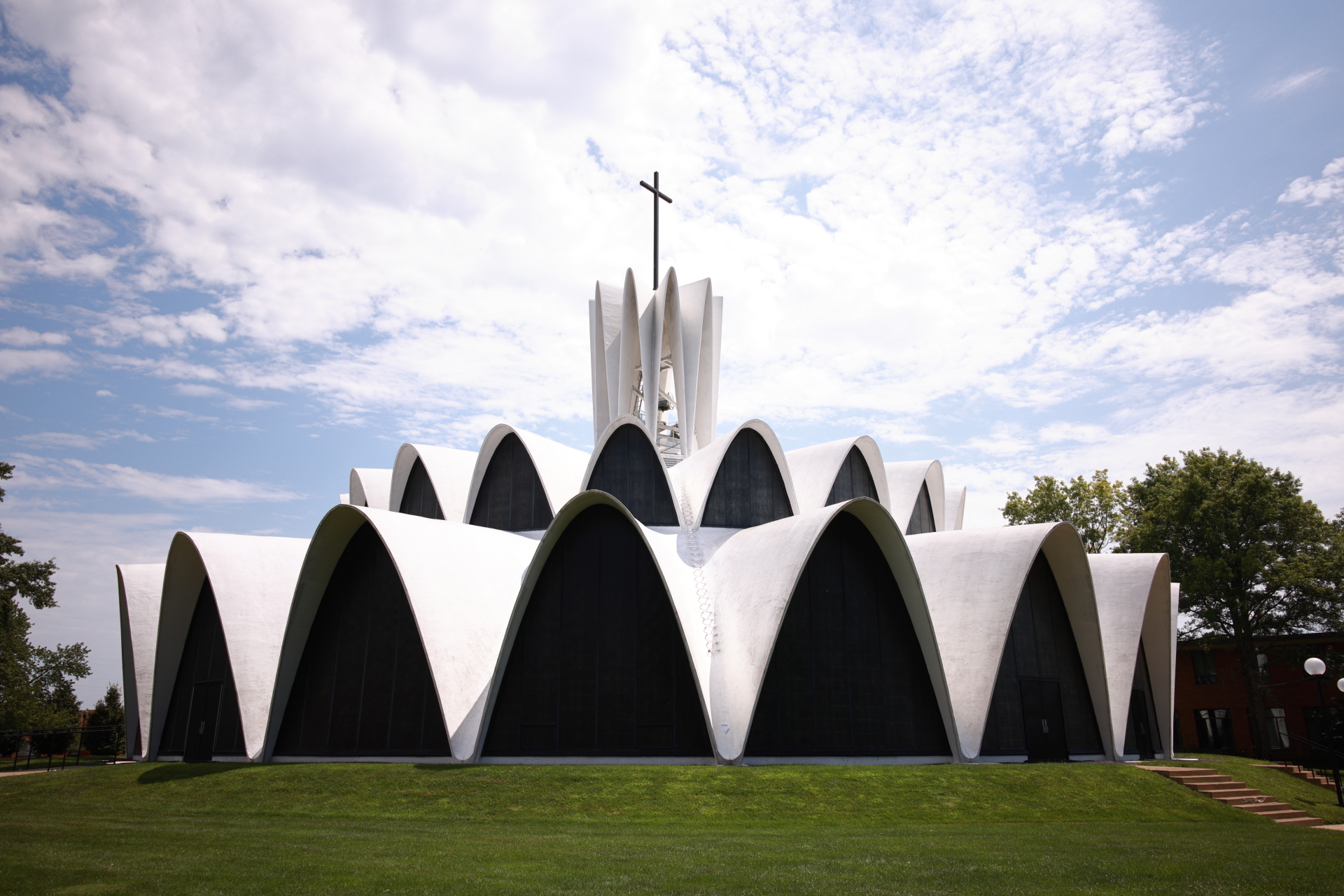
Exterior of the Priory Chapel at Saint Louis Abbey

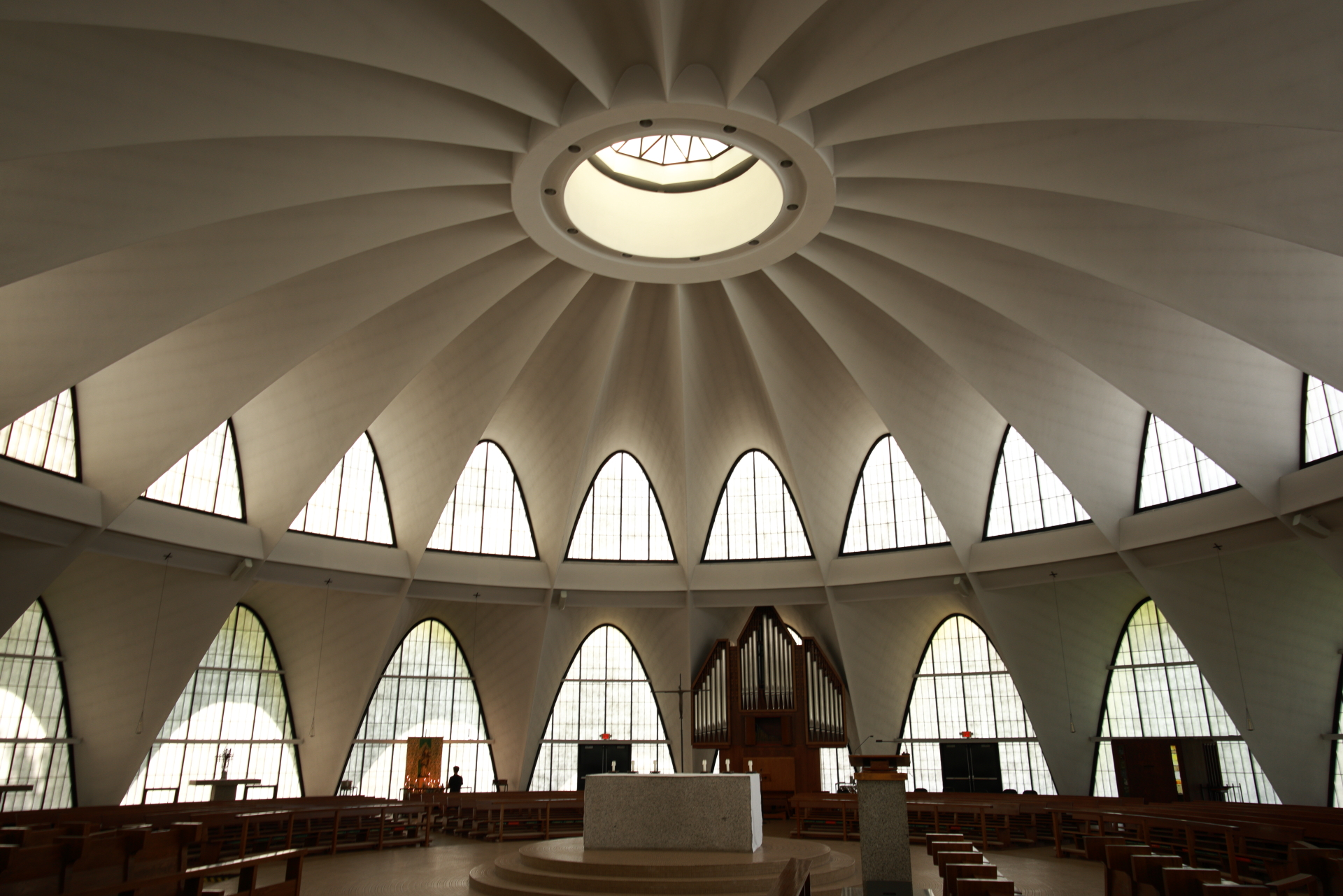
Saint Louis Abbey Interior

The Abbey of Saint Mary and Saint Louis, more commonly known as Saint Louis Abbey, is a Catholic abbey of the English Benedictine Congregation in Creve Coeur, Missouri. The monks live according to the Benedictine discipline of "prayer and work'", praying the Divine Office daily, celebrating daily Masses in English and Latin, and working in two parishes and the Saint Louis Priory School. The abbey and school sit on a 150-acre (0.61 km^{2}) campus.

== History ==
Saint Louis Abbey was founded in 1955 as a priory of the Benedictine Ampleforth Abbey in North Yorkshire, England, which dispatched three monks to plant a new foundation in St. Louis. They came at the invitation of Cardinal Joseph E. Ritter and a group of prominent St. Louis lay Catholics, who desired a boys' school in their community run according to the English Benedictine educational tradition. Those original three monks, Frs Columba Cary-Elwes, future abbot Luke Rigby, and Timothy Horner, arrived in St. Louis in the summer of 1955 and set about the formation of a new monastic community, with Cary-Elwes serving as the community's founding prior and Horner serving as the founding headmaster of Saint Louis Priory School.

Cary-Elwes served as prior until 1967, when he departed for missionary work in Africa, and was succeeded in his post by Rigby. The St. Louis Priory, as it then was, became independent of Ampleforth in 1973, and was elevated to an abbey in 1989. At this time, Rigby was elected as the first abbot of Saint Louis Abbey. He was in turn succeeded by Fr. Thomas Frerking, a Rhodes Scholar, former headmaster of the Priory School and Thomist scholar, who was elected abbot on July 12, 1995. He retired in June 2018. Fr, Gregory Mohrman, from the class of 1976, was elected abbot thereafter.

Construction of the distinctive Abbey Church was completed in 1962, and the original 1950s monastery was rebuilt and expanded in 2000–2001. The various buildings of the Priory School also sit on the Abbey grounds; the current Lower House was constructed in the 1960s, and served as the Upper House at the time of its completion. The current Upper House was completed in several stages built from the 1970s through the 1990s.

As of 2020, St. Louis Abbey was home to a community of 26 monks. In addition to their other duties and ministries, many of the brothers are directly involved in the Abbey's school, teaching classes in most areas of instruction including Theology, Latin, Fine Arts, English, Mathematics, and Science, and coaching sporting teams including Tennis and Rugby.

In line with the Benedictine tradition of offering hospitality and respite to travelers, the Abbey maintains a guest wing on the south side of the monastery with five rooms and two gardens. The brethren make themselves available to guests to hear confessions or provide counsel.

== Abbey Church ==
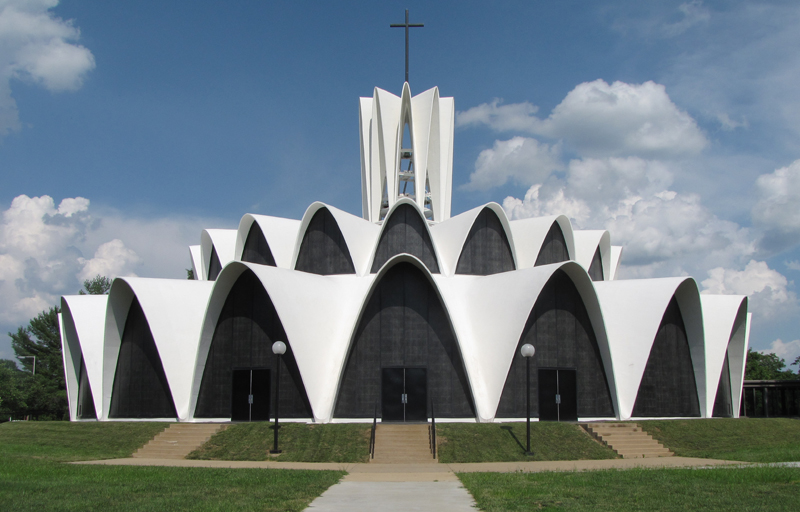
Saint Louis Abbey Church

The Abbey Church was constructed in 1962 and was finished on September 7, 1962. It is also known as the Church of the Abbey of St. Mary and St. Louis. It was designed by Gyo Obata of Hellmuth, Obata and Kassabaum.

The Abbey Church was an important landmark and name-making project for HOK, now the world's largest architectural practice (according to the 2006 edition of the BD World Architecture 200). The church's circular facade consists of three tiers of whitewashed, thin-poured concrete parabolic arches, the top one forming a bell-tower; the arches appear to float upwards from their grassy base. They are faced with dark insulated-fiberglass polyester window walls which create a meditative translucency when viewed from within.

The church also contains a 14th-century sculpture of the Madonna and Christ child, a 17th-century holy font in the Della Robbia style, and more modern sacred art by artists from the United States, Great Britain, Spain, and France. The church is also home to a tracker action organ build by Gregor Hradetzky of Krems. On the grounds outside the church sit life-size sculptures of Saint Benedict, by Lithuanian-born artist Wiktor Szostalo, and of the Virgin Mary, the "Holy Blessed Virgin Mother Mary, Our Lady of Grace" by American sculptor Philip Howie.

The church holds a 14th-century sculpture of the Madonna and Christ child, a 17th-century holy font in the Della Robbia style, and modern sacred art by artists from the United States, Great Britain, Spain, and France. The 2007 AIA|CPC Design Committee gave its Twenty-five Year Award to the Abbey Church/Priory Chapel.

The Abbey Church is the home church for the Archdiocese of Saint Louis parish of Saint Anselm.

== Notable brethren ==
- The Rt. Rev. Columba Cary-Elwes, OSB, an author, monastic leader and former titular Abbot of Westminster, was the founding prior (1955–1967) of the Abbey.
- Fr. Timothy Horner, OSB, served as an editor for the widely used 1980 edition of the Rule of Saint Benedict, and has published an account of the founding of the Abbey and its school, In Good Soil.
- Fr. Ralph Wright, OSB, is an accomplished poet, author and translator whose works include a reflection on the Eucharist in poems and prose entitled Our Daily Bread, and whose translation efforts include the English edition of The Joy of Believing, a collection of the writings of the French mystic Madeleine Delbrêl.
- Father J. Augustine Wetta, OSB, the Abbey's director of vocations, is an author, public speaker, and essayist. His books include Humility Rules and The Eighth Arrow: Odysseus in the Underworld.
