= John Klein (soccer, born 1965) =

American soccer player and coach

Personal information
- Full name: John D. Klein II
- Date of birth: April 10, 1965 (age 61)
- Place of birth: St. Louis, Missouri, U.S.
- Position: Midfielder

College career
Years	Team	Apps	(Gls)
1983–1984	Duke Blue Devils		
1985–1986	Saint Louis Billikens		

Senior career*
Years	Team	Apps	(Gls)
1987	F.C. Washington		
1988	St. Louis Kutis		
1989–1990	St. Louis Storm (indoor)	4	(0)
1990	Colorado Foxes		
1990–1991	Kansas City Comets (indoor)	34	(4)
1991–1992	St. Louis Storm (indoor)		
1992	Miami Freedom	6	(1)
1992–1996	St. Louis Ambush (indoor)	135	(49)

Managerial career
- 1995–1996: Columbia Cougars (men's assistant)
- 2000–2024: Columbia Cougars (men's)
- 2012–2024: Columbia Cougars (women's)
- 2025–: Southeast Missouri State (women’s)
- * Club domestic league appearances and goals

John Klein is an American retired soccer midfielder who played professionally in the American Professional Soccer League, Major Indoor Soccer League and National Professional Soccer League. He currently coaches the Southeast Missouri State women's soccer team.

== Player ==
Klein graduated from Saint Louis Priory School in 1983. In 1983, Klein began his collegiate career with the Duke Blue Devils. He then transferred to Saint Louis University after the 1984 season where he finished his college career. He was inducted into the Saint Louis Billikens Athletic Hall of Fame in 1995.

In 1987, Klein played for the independent F.C. Washington. Klein also played for St. Louis Kutis. In October 1989, Klein signed with the St. Louis Storm of the Major Indoor Soccer League. He played four games before being moved to the developmental squad in December. When Klein refused to move to the developmental squad, the Storm released him. In the summer of 1990, Klein played for the Colorado Foxes of the American Professional Soccer League. That fall, he signed with the Kansas City Comets of MISL where he played the 1990–1991 indoor season. In October 1991, he returned to the Storm. In the summer of 1992, he played for the Miami Freedom. In 1992, he joined the St. Louis Ambush of the National Professional Soccer League.

Klein is a member of the St. Louis Soccer Hall of Fame.

== Coach ==
On February 11, 2000, Columbia College hired Klein as head coach of the men's soccer team.

On January 21, 2025, Southeast Missouri State hired Klein as head coach for their women’s soccer team.

== Personal ==
Klein has 3 children, John, Molly, and Emily. John Klein III played on the St. Louis City 2 team in the 2023 MLS. Molly played for Klein's Columbia College women's team from 2016 to 2019, and has also coached alongside her father at Columbia College as a graduate assistant.
