= J. Augustine Wetta =

American monk and author (born 1971)

J. Augustine Wetta OSB
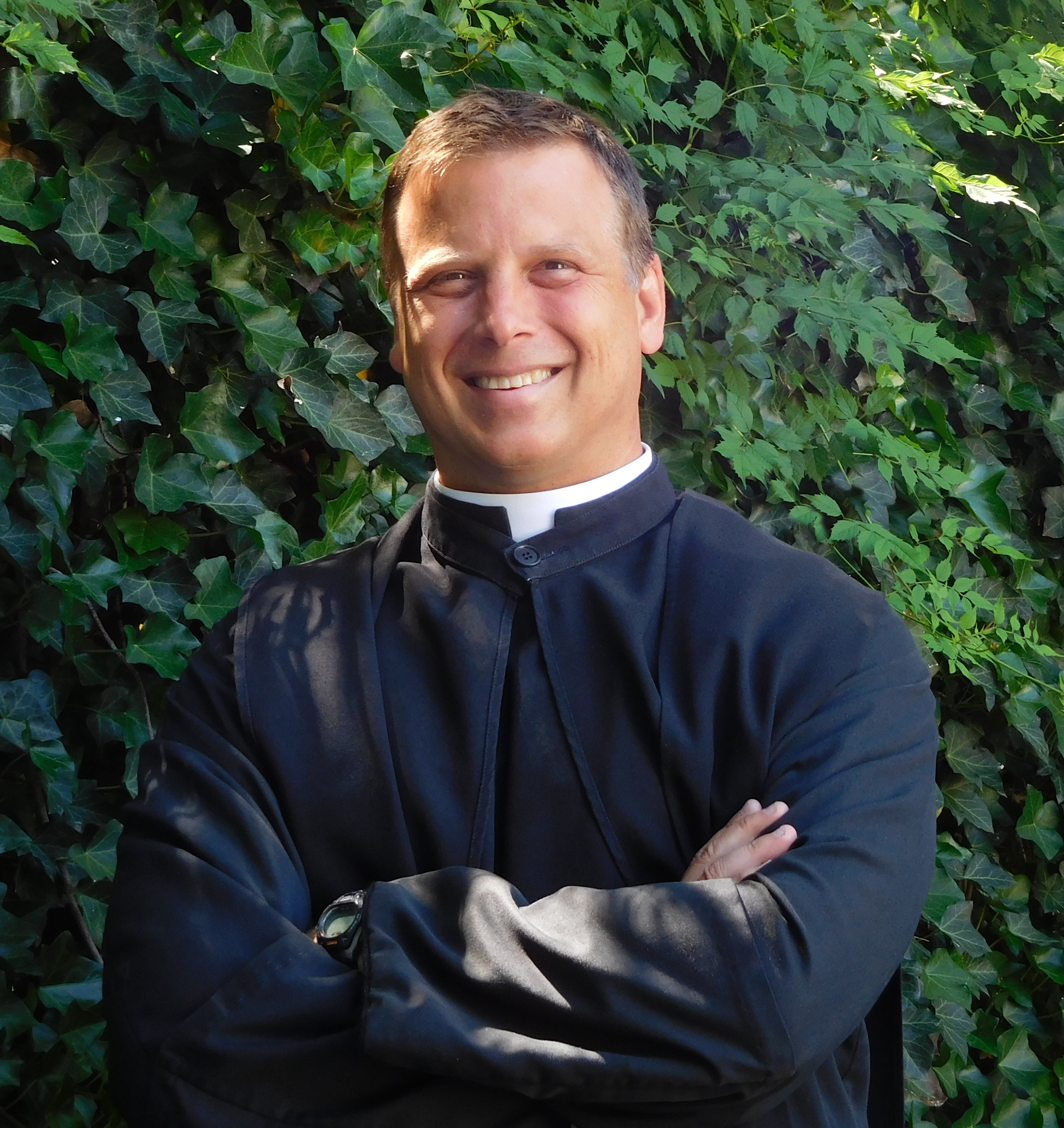
- Born: Jason Wetta; January 20, 1971 (age 55); Baton Rouge, Louisiana
- Education: Rice University (BA); University of Oxford (BA, MA); Middlebury College (MA)
- Occupations: Author; Benedictine monk; Catholic priest; teacher
- Writing career
- Language: English
- Genres: Nonfiction; Fantasy
- Subjects: Catholic spirituality; Christian monasticism; Teen self-help
- Website: augustinewetta.com

J. Augustine Wetta, O.S.B. (born January 20, 1971), is an American Benedictine monk, Catholic priest, author, and educator. He is a monk of Saint Louis Abbey in Creve Coeur, Missouri and teaches at Saint Louis Priory School. He is the author of Humility Rules: Saint Benedict's Twelve-Step Guide to Genuine Self-Esteem and the novel The Eighth Arrow.

== Early life and education ==
Wetta was born in Baton Rouge, Louisiana in 1971, but grew up in Galveston, Texas. He is the child of artist Jean Carruthers Wetta and historian Frank Wetta.

He graduated from Rice University with a bachelor's degree in Ancient Mediterranean Civilizations in 1992. He received a B.A. and an M.A. in Theology from the University of Oxford in 2002 and an M.A. in English from Middlebury College in 2008.

== Religious and teaching career ==
Wetta was ordained a priest on September 27, 2003, and serves as chaplain to the Saint Louis Priory School where he also teaches apologetics, English literature, and ethics.

He has also appeared on Catholic television, radio, and podcasts. He has appeared as a guest on EWTN programs including Life on the Rock, Power and Witness, At Home with Jim and Joy, and The Chris Stefanick Show. In 2023, he appeared on Matt Fradd's podcast Pints with Aquinas, where he discussed his religious vocation and teaching career.

Wetta has cohosted the Disagreement podcast with Umar Lee since 2021.

== Writing ==
Wetta's 2017 book Humility Rules: Saint Benedict's Twelve-Step Guide to Genuine Self-Esteem adapts the twelve stages of humility in the Rule of Saint Benedict into a self-help format. Humility Rules received reviews in both the National Catholic Register and New Oxford Review.

His 2018 novel The Eighth Arrow: Odysseus in the Underworld, reimagines Odysseus and Diomedes attempting to escape the afterlife of Dante's Inferno following the visit from Dante and Virgil.

== Bibliography ==
=== Books ===
- Pray. Think. Act.: Make Better Decisions with the Desert Fathers (2023)
- The Eighth Arrow: Odysseus in the Underworld (2018)
- Humility Rules: Saint Benedict's Twelve-Step Guide to Genuine Self-Esteem (2017)
- Saving Grace

=== Selected articles ===
- Listening in Ferguson (2015)
- His Wide Mouth Home (1999)
