= Eddy L. Harris =

American writer and filmmaker (born 1956)

- Born: January 26, 1956 (age 70); Indianapolis, Indiana, U.S.
- Education: Stanford University
- Occupations: Writer and filmmaker

Eddy L. Harris (born January 26, 1956) is an American writer of creative nonfiction and a filmmaker.

== Early life ==
Harris was born in Indianapolis, Indiana, and moved to St. Louis, Missouri, at 18 months of age. He graduated from the Saint Louis Priory School and Stanford University. Harris has worked as a Visiting Writer-in-Residence at Washington University in St. Louis and as a faculty member in Goucher College's writing program, and he lives in France.

== Writing career ==
Harris published his first work, Mississippi Solo, an account of his journey by canoe down the entire length of the nation's major waterway, in 1988. As with Harris's subsequent works, the book focused on African-American identity in relation to history and place. Mississippi Solo was the 2003–2004 selection of Missouri ReadMOre, a statewide book-reading program, and Harris received the Missouri Governor's Humanities Award for this work in 2004.

His second book, Native Stranger, an account of his journey through Africa, led to a loss of some Black readers. Harris described the poverty and corruption he witnessed in many places, as well as the despair he both saw and felt at times. He has said in an interview that after the book's publication, some Black readers came to readings to criticize him.

His third book, South of Haunted Dreams, describes Harris's solo motorcycle trip through the deep South.

In a 2005 interview with Missy Raterman and Zoe Wexler in nidus, a literary and arts journal based at the University of Pittsburgh, Harris described his work as "certainly travel, because it has some aspects of travel in it, though it isn't like Paul Theroux's travel books. Essay works best for me because I just like the idea of being an essayist. It is memoirist because it is me and my memories – but that's a marketing thing." In the same interview, he questioned the automatic categorization of him as a "Black" writer and its effects on how his work might be read, though he also acknowledged his desire for his work to create bridges both within and outside Black culture.

Practically unrecognized in the US and with his works nearly out of print, Harris now lives in France, where he has been awarded the 21st (2007) Prix du Livre en Poitou-Charentes for Still Life in Harlem (published as Harlem in France). His work has been acknowledged by the Centre national du livre, notably for Jupiter et Moi, a memoir about the life of a black man and his son. His most recent book to have been published is Paris en noir et black (Liana Levi, 2009), a translation by Jean Guiloineau of Paris Reflected in Black and White.

In 2014, Harris began producing a documentary film about his second canoe journey down the Mississippi River, River to the Heart, which screened on November 4, 2017, at the St. Louis International Film Festival. In an interview posted on Bending Branches website, Harris described the film by stating that "he wanted to experience and then show others that no matter what our color, the more we know each other the less we fear, and the more unity we'll have as a country."

== Books ==
- Mississippi Solo, 1988.
- Native Stranger, 1992. (Selected as a "Notable Book of 1992" by The New York Times)
- South of Haunted Dreams, 1993.
- Still Life in Harlem, 1996. (Selected as a "Notable Book of 1997" by The New York Times), translated into French as Harlem, 2007.
- Jupiter et Moi, 2005.
- Paris en noir et black, 2009.
- Confession américaine, 2024.

== Films ==
- River to the Heart, 2017. Winner, Best Documentary in Ozark Foothills FilmFest.
