= Thomas Schlafly =

American writer (born 1948)

- Born: Thomas Francis Schlafly; October 28, 1948 (age 77)
- Education: Georgetown University (BA, JD)
- Relatives: Andrew Schlafly (cousin); Phyllis Schlafly (aunt)

Thomas Francis Schlafly (born October 28, 1948) is an American businessman and writer. He co-founded the Saint Louis Brewery, which produces the Schlafly line of beers. Schlafly is a graduate of the Saint Louis Priory School and received his B.A. and J.D. from Georgetown University.

In his capacity with the brewery, he writes a column every month, "Top Fermentation". In 2006, he published A New Religion in Mecca: Memoir of a Renegade Brewery in St. Louis (Virginia Publishing), which recounted the founding of the Saint Louis Brewery. He is also an attorney, working as a partner in the St. Louis office of Thompson Coburn. He is a nephew of St. Louis conservative commentator Phyllis Schlafly.

In 2012, Schlafly was a member of a group of St. Louisans who assumed ownership of the St. Louis Blues professional ice hockey team.
