= Andrew Schlafly =

American lawyer and activist (born 1961)

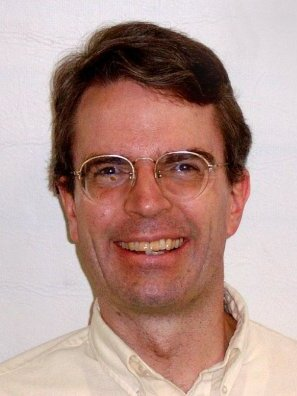
- Schlafly in 2007
- Born: Andrew Layton Schlafly; April 27, 1961 (age 65); Alton, Illinois, U.S.
- Education: Princeton University (BS); Harvard University (JD)
- Political party: Republican
- Spouse: Catherine Kosarek (m. 1984)
- Children: 2
- Mother: Phyllis Schlafly
- Relatives: Thomas Schlafly (cousin)

Andrew Layton Schlafly (/ˈʃlæfli/; born April 27, 1961) is an American lawyer, and Christian conservative activist. He is the founder and owner of the wiki encyclopedia project Conservapedia. He is the son of the conservative activist and lawyer Phyllis Schlafly.

Schlafly was the lead counsel for the Association of American Physicians and Surgeons' efforts to bring the Patient Protection and Affordable Care Act before the United States Supreme Court.

== Early life and education ==
Schlafly is one of six children. His great-great-grandfather August Schlafly was a Swiss immigrant to the United States. His father Fred Schlafly was an attorney, and his mother Phyllis (née Stewart) spearheaded the movement opposing the Equal Rights Amendment and was founder of the Eagle Forum.

Born and raised Catholic in Alton, Illinois, Schlafly graduated from Saint Louis Priory School and later received a B.S.E. in electrical engineering and certificate in engineering physics from Princeton University in 1981.

== Career ==
=== Engineering ===
After graduating from Princeton, Schlafly briefly worked as a device physicist for Intel in Santa Clara, California until 1983, when he became a microelectronics engineer at the Johns Hopkins University Applied Physics Laboratory. Schlafly later worked for Bell Labs before enrolling at Harvard Law School.

=== Legal ===
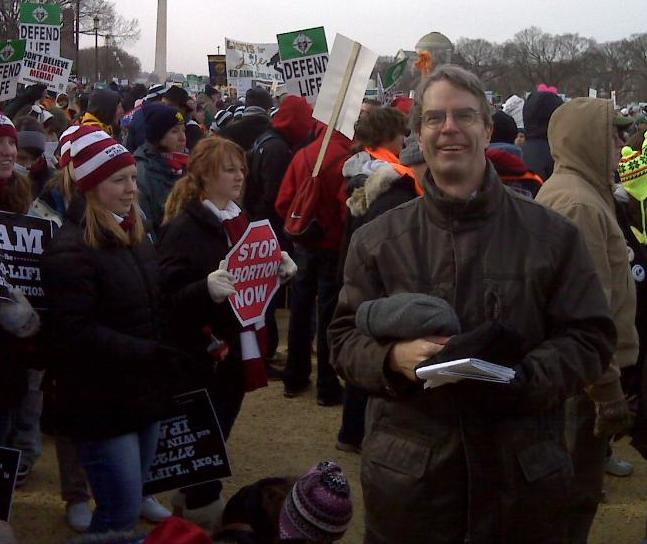
Schlafly at the 2011 March for Life

Schlafly graduated from Harvard Law School in 1991 with a J.D. in the class that included future U.S. president Barack Obama. From 1989 to 1991, Schlafly was an editor of the Harvard Law Review.

After law school, Schlafly served as an adjunct professor at Seton Hall Law School. In 1992, Schlafly ran as a Republican for the United States House of Representatives seat of Virginia's 11th congressional district; Schlafly came in last place in a field of five candidates in the primary.

Schlafly was an associate for the Wachtell, Lipton, Rosen & Katz law firm in New York City before moving to private practice. Additionally, he is General Counsel at the Association of American Physicians and Surgeons and led its unsuccessful Supreme Court challenge to the Patient Protection and Affordable Care Act. In 2010, Schlafly wrote an article for the Journal of American Physicians and Surgeons about the economic effects of the legislation.

In 2010, Schlafly took the role of lead counsel for a group seeking to recall US Senator Bob Menendez, a Democrat from New Jersey. The group, associated with the Tea Party movement, argued that the US Constitution permits a recall election for federal offices without explicitly so providing. On November 18, 2010, the New Jersey Supreme Court rejected Schlafly's arguments, finding that the New Jersey provision violated the U.S. Constitution. Later that year, Schlafly represented the group RecallND in RecallND v. Jaeger before the North Dakota Supreme Court in another effort to recall Democratic Senator Kent Conrad.

=== Conservapedia ===
Schlafly created the wiki-based Conservapedia in November 2006 to counter what he perceived as a liberal bias present in Wikipedia. He felt the need to start the project after reading a student's assignment written using Common Era dating notation, rather than the Anno Domini system that he preferred. Although he was "an early Wikipedia enthusiast", as reported by Shawn Zeller of Congressional Quarterly, Schlafly became concerned about perceived bias after Wikipedia editors repeatedly undid his edits to the article about the 2005 Kansas evolution hearings. Schlafly expressed hope that Conservapedia would become a general resource for American educators and a counterpoint to the liberal bias that he perceived in Wikipedia.

The site has been accused of spreading misinformation on scientific subjects, such as HIV/AIDS denialism, the abortion-breast cancer hypothesis, climate change denial, relativity denial, and vaccine/autism connections, and has advocated Young Earth creationism, Barack Obama citizenship conspiracy theories and conspiracy theories that the January 6 United States Capitol attack was staged. Additionally, it features extensive criticisms of atheism, feminism, homosexuality, and the Democratic Party.

In 2009, Schlafly appeared on The Colbert Report to discuss his Conservative Bible Project, a project hosted on Conservapedia that aims to rewrite English translations of the Bible in order to remove or alter terms advancing a "liberal bias".

=== Dialogue with Richard Lenski ===
Richard Lenski, an evolutionary biologist who worked on the E. coli long-term evolution experiment, was contacted by Schlafly in 2008 regarding a set of results that showed one population of E. coli evolved the novel trait of being able to metabolize citrate. Conservapedia supports creationism and objects to evolution, so Schlafly disputed that bacteria could evolve via beneficial mutations. The correspondence was commented on across the Internet. Schlafly was criticized by Lenski on Ars Technica for not reading Lenski's paper properly, for not understanding the experimental data he requested, and for not taking notice of people on Conservapedia itself who considered the paper well researched.

=== Trademark lawsuit against Saint Louis Brewery ===
In 2011, Schlafly led a lawsuit on behalf of the family of his activist mother, Phyllis, to block The Saint Louis Brewery from acquiring a trademark on the name "Schlafly". In 2018, the U.S. Federal Circuit Court of Appeals ruled in favor of The Saint Louis Brewery.

== Personal life ==
In 1984, Schlafly married Catherine Kosarek, a medical student and fellow Princeton alum. They live in Far Hills, New Jersey.
