= Columba Cary-Elwes =

English Benedictine monk

Dom Columba Cary-Elwes, OSB (born Charles Evelyn George Cary-Elwes; 6 November 1903 – 22 January 1994) was an English Benedictine monk who professed vows at Ampleforth Abbey in York, England. As a missionary he travelled to Uganda, Tanzania and Kenya and has written books on Christianity. He was the founding prior of the Priory of Saints Louis and Mary (later Saint Louis Abbey) in Saint Louis, Missouri.

== Biography ==
=== Early years ===
Born in London in 1903, Charles Evelyn George Cary-Elwes was one of eight children of Charles and Edythe Cary-Elwes. His father and maternal grandfather, Sir John Roper Parkington, were champagne shippers, the family all speaking fluent French. He was educated by the Jesuits at Saint Michel, Brussels, between 1913 and 1914, and then at Ampleforth College, a leading Roman Catholic school in England, then worked in the family wine business until in 1923 he was clothed in the Benedictine order at Ampleforth, his abbot giving him the name of Columba. In 1925 he professed his simple vows and the following year made his solemn vows. In 1927 he matriculated at Oxford to study modern languages (French and Spanish) at the university's Benedictine foundation, St Benet's Hall. After graduating in 1930, Cary-Elwes went on to study theology at Blackfriars, London, until 1933, when he was ordained a priest. He then returned to Ampleforth, where he served as Monastic Librarian, as a language teacher in the school, and as housemaster of St. Wilfrid's House (1937–51). He led services at the chapel at Helmsley for several years.

=== Later years ===
In 1951, he was appointed Prior of Ampleforth, and four years later, was selected to be the founding prior of the new foundation at Saint Louis, where he served until June 1967. Columba left in 1968 for East Africa to conduct spiritual retreats and inquire about establishing a monastic foundation in that region. In 1968, his travels took him to Nigeria, Uganda, Tanzania and Kenya. During 1969, he taught at a major seminary in Nairobi. In 1970, he served as French interpreter during the Pope's visit to Uganda, after which he returned to Ampleforth.

In 1972, he was "loaned" (as his Ampleforth obituary describes it), to the Benedictines of Glenstal Abbey in Ireland, to help establish a monastery in Eke, Nigeria, in 1974, where he served as Prior beginning in 1975. Columba was a close friend of the noted historian Arnold J. Toynbee, who educated several of his sons at Ampleforth. In 1986, their correspondence, edited by the Saint Louis lawyer Christian Peper, is collected in An Historian's Conscience. During this period he also helped to establish a Catholic seminary in Cameroon. In his later years, he returned to Ampleforth, but made ecumenical and spiritual renewal visits to Catholic communities and clerical establishments in the Philippines, Australia, India, and Chile. At nearly 90, he was appointed the Titular Abbot of Westminster in 1992.

== Death ==
Dom Columba Cary-Elwes died on 22 January 1994, aged 90, at York Hospital. He was buried at Ampleforth.

== Family ==
Columba Cary-Elwes is related to the painters Dominick Elwes and Simon Elwes and the diplomat and tenor Gervase Cary Elwes, respectively the father, grandfather, and great-grandfather of the actor Cary Elwes, the painter Damian Elwes, and the film producer Cassian Elwes.

== Bibliography ==
- An Historian's Conscience: The Correspondence of Arnold J. Toynbee and Columba Cary-Elwes- Monk of Ampleforth with Christian B., Peper and Arnold Joseph Toynbee (1986)
- The Beginning of Goodness (1947)
- A Simple Way of Love, edited and introduced by Cary-Elwes (1948)
- Law, Liberty and Love; A Study in Christian Obedience; Foundation of European Civilisation (1949)
- Ampleforth and its Origins. Essays ... by members of the Ampleforth Community, edited with Abbot Justin McCann, with plates by Philip Justin Maccann and Cary Elwes (1952)
- The Sheepfold and the Shepherd (1956)
- China and the Cross; a Survey of Missionary History (1957)
- Monastic Renewal (1967)
- Experience with God: A Dictionary of Spirituality (1986)
- Work & Prayer: The Rule of St. Benedict for Lay People, with Catherine Wybourne. London: Burns & Oates, Turnbridge Wells (1992)
