= Schlafly Beer =

Craft brewery based in St. Louis, Missouri

Schlafly Beer - The Saint Louis Brewery
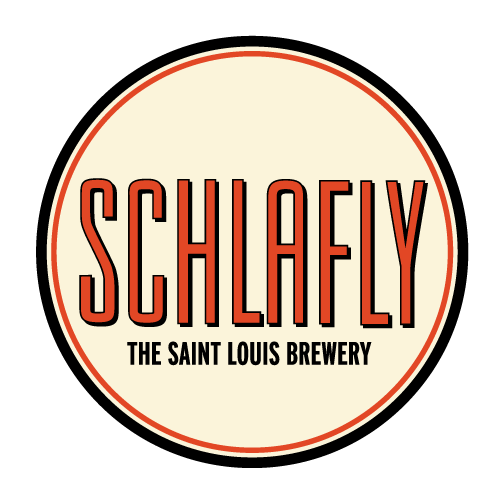
- Type: Regional Craft Brewery
- Location: St. Louis, Missouri
- Opened: December 26, 1991
- Owned by: Tom Schlafly, David Schlafly
- Employees: 150-200
- Website: www.schlafly.com

The Saint Louis Brewery, primarily known as Schlafly, is the largest independent craft brewery based in St. Louis, Missouri. Schlafly brews more than 60 styles of beer and operates brewpubs in the greater St. Louis area.

== History ==
Tom Schlafly, Charles Kopman, and Dan Kopman incorporated The Saint Louis Brewery in 1989. Two years later, they hired a brewmaster, Dave Miller, and opened their first brewpub on December 26, 1991. The Schlafly Tap Room was the first brewpub to open in Missouri since Prohibition.

In 1997, Schlafly beer was first sold in Busch Memorial Stadium and found its way into other establishments in the St. Louis area.

=== Trademark lawsuit ===
In 2011, the brewery applied for a trademark on the Schlafly name. Relatives of the conservative Phyllis Schlafly filed a lawsuit, led by her son Andrew Schlafly, an attorney and cousin of the founders. In 2018, the U.S. Federal Circuit Court of Appeals ruled in favor of The Saint Louis Brewery.

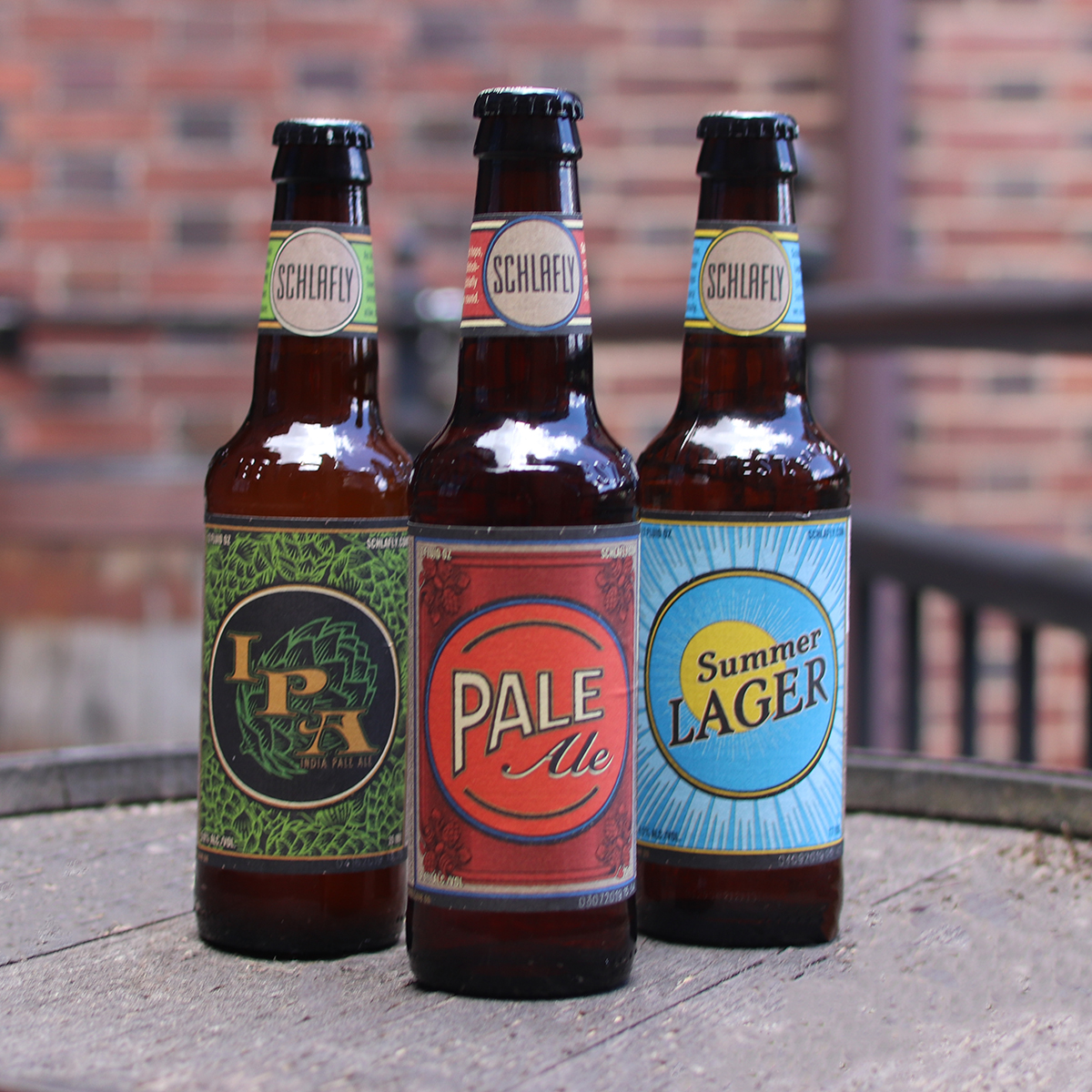
Schlafly Pale Ale, IPA, and Summer Lager are all staples of The Saint Louis Brewery.

== Awards ==
- Gold Medal for Best German-style Kölsch in the World Beer Cup in 2010.
- Silver Medal in the Pumpkin/Squash Beer or Pumpkin Spice Beer category for its Pumpkin Ale in 2017 at the Great American Beer Festival.
