= Martin John Amos =

American prelate

His Excellency, The Most Reverend Martin John Amos DD
- Bishop Emeritus of Davenport
- Church: Catholic Church
- Appointed: October 12, 2006
- Installed: November 20, 2006
- Retired: April 19, 2017
- Predecessor: William Edwin Franklin
- Successor: Thomas Zinkula
- Previous post: Auxiliary Bishop of Cleveland and Titular Bishop of Meta (2001-2006)

Orders
- Ordination: May 25, 1968 by Clarence George Issenmann
- Consecration: June 7, 2001 by Anthony Michael Pilla, Alexander James Quinn, and Anthony Edward Pevec

Personal details
- Born: December 8, 1941 (age 84) Cleveland, Ohio
- Motto: Doce me Domine (Teach me, O Lord)

Styles of Martin John Amos
- Reference style: His Excellency; The Most Reverend
- Spoken style: Your Excellency
- Religious style: Bishop

Martin John Amos (born December 8, 1941) is an American Catholic prelate who served as bishop of Davenport in Iowa from 2006 to 2017. He was previously an auxiliary bishop in the Diocese of Cleveland in Ohio from 2001 to 2006.

== Biography ==
=== Early life and ministry ===
Martin John Amos was born on December 8, 1941, in Cleveland, Ohio. He was the oldest of six children born to Martin and Mary Amos. He grew up in a working-class neighborhood on the west side of Cleveland, attending Our Lady of Good Counsel Church. Amos was educated at Benjamin Franklin Elementary School and James Ford Rhodes High School, both in Cleveland.

Amos then attended Borromeo Seminary College in Wickliffe, Ohio and St. Mary Seminary in Cleveland. Amos graduated from St. Mary in 1968 with a Bachelor of Sacred Theology degree. He was awarded a Master of Science in Education degree in 1975 from St. John's College in Cleveland

=== Priesthood ===
On May 25, 1968, Amos was ordained a priest of the Diocese of Cleveland by Bishop Clarence Issenmann at St. John Bosco Church in Parma Heights, Ohio. After his ordination, Amos was assigned as associate pastor of St. James Parish in Lakewood, Ohio. In 1970, he was posted to St. Thomas Parish in Sheffield Lake, Ohio, serving there until 1973. Amos was also teaching religion during this period at Elyria Catholic High School in Elyria, Ohio, and Lorain Catholic High School in Lorain, Ohio.

In 1973, Amos became a teacher at Borromeo Seminary High School in Wickliffe. While teaching at Borromeo, he also attended John Carroll University to obtain teaching and administration certifications. With the closing of the high school in 1976, Amos was appoint academic dean of Borromeo College. He taught Latin and scripture, staying at the college until 1988. In 1983, Amos was also appointed assistant pastor of St. Dominic Parish in Shaker Heights, Ohio, becoming pastor there in 1985. He would remain at St. Dominic until his appointment as auxiliary bishop.

=== Auxiliary Bishop of Cleveland ===
On April 3, 2001, Pope John Paul II appointed Amos as titular bishop of Meta and auxiliary bishop of Cleveland. He was ordained by Bishop Anthony M. Pilla on June 7, 2001, in the Cathedral of St. John the Evangelist in Cleveland. The principal co-consecrators were Auxiliary Bishops Alexander J. Quinn and Anthony E. Pevec.

=== Bishop of Davenport ===
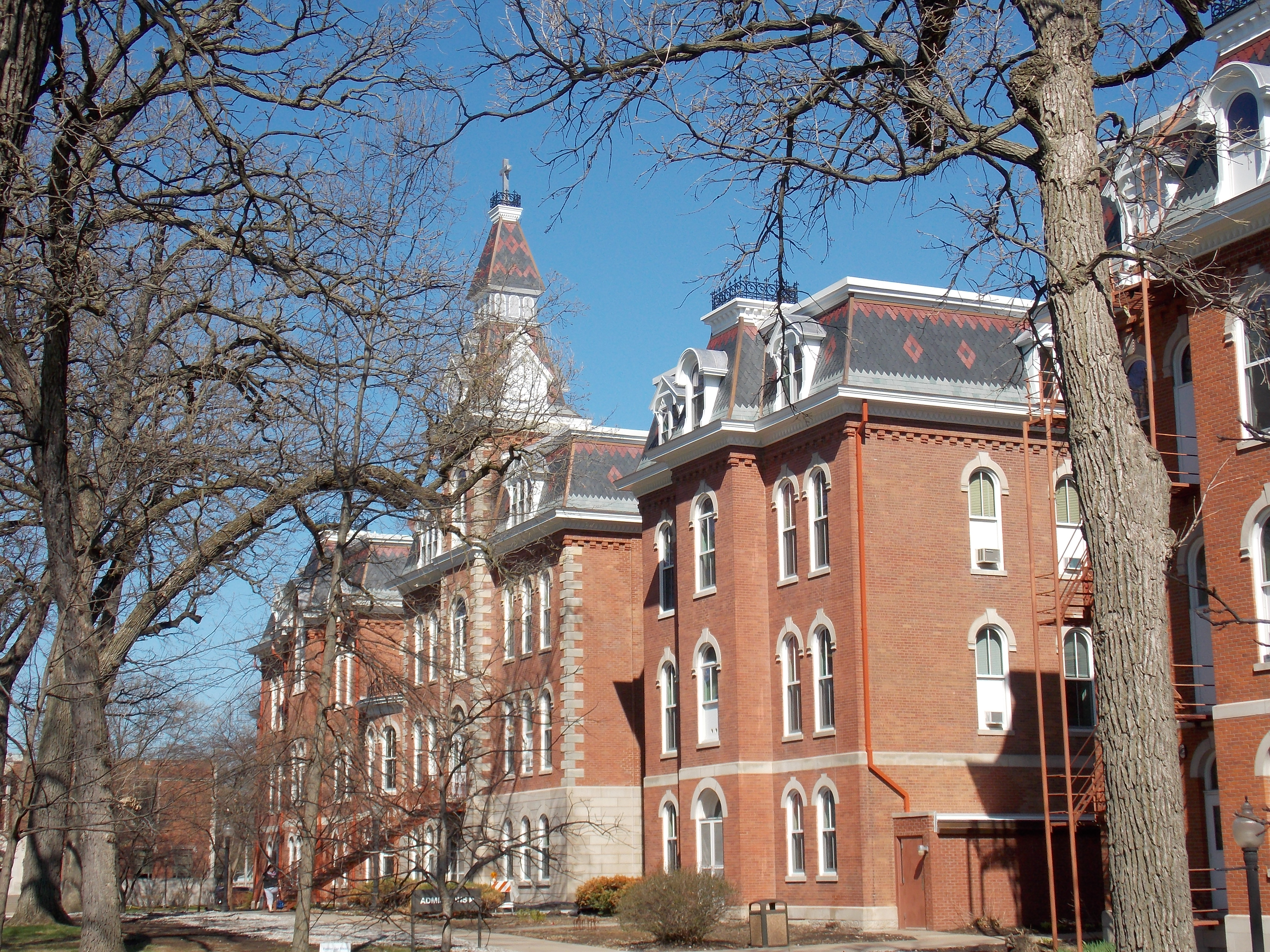
St. Ambrose University, Davenport, Iowa (2014)

On October 12, 2006, Pope Benedict XVI appointed Amos as the eighth bishop of the Diocese of Davenport. He was installed by Archbishop Jerome Hanus on November 20, 2006, with Archbishop Pietro Sambi present, at St. John Vianney Church in Bettendorf, Iowa.

Two days before Amos assumed office, the diocese filed for Chapter 11 Bankruptcy protection. As a result of the bankruptcy, the diocese was forced to sell off property, including the bishop's residence, to pay for a financial settlement to sexual abuse victims. Amos had previously requested a small fixer-upper house to live in, believing the bishop's residence too big for him.

In 2007, Amos announced that the board of trustees of St. Ambrose University had decided to remove the name of Bishop Gerald O'Keefe from the school library. O'Keefe had covered up sexual abuse crimes by priests in the diocese. In 2010, the diocese re-established the diocesan branch of Catholic Charities. The organization was introduced into the diocese in 1929 by Bishop Henry Rohlman, but was discontinued in 1968.

The diocese sold the chancery building, the St. Vincent Center, and the surrounding property to St. Ambrose University in 2009. A $22 million capital campaign was also initiated in 2009 to replenish diocesan finances and to provide the finances for other projects. In 2010, the diocese bought back the St. Vincent Center and five acres of land from St. Ambrose.

In 2012, Amos rescinded an invitation to a representative of the Rich Eychaner Charitable Foundation to present a scholarship to Keaton Fuller, a student at the Prince of Peace Catholic School in Clinton, Iowa. The Eychander Foundation promotes anti-bullying legislation and seeks to promote tolerance and non-discrimination for LBGTQ+ youth. Amos and the foundation reached a compromise in which a foundation representative from the foundation would award the statue to Fuller and a diocesan representative would deliver a pre-approved statement from the foundation.

=== Retirement ===
On April 19, 2017, Pope Francis accepted Amos' letter of resignation as Bishop of Davenport and named Monsignor Thomas Zinkula as his replacement. Amos attended the installation mass in Cleveland on July 13, 2015, of Bishop Edward C. Malesic, the new bishop of Cleveland.

After the sudden death of Bishop George Murry from the Diocese of Youngstown in Ohio on June 5, 2020, the Vatican assigned Amos to assist Monsignor Robert Siffrin in running the diocese until a new bishop was installed. Amos' role was to ordain priests, deacons and transitional deacons in the diocese. In January 2021, Amos was invited to the installation mass of the new bishop of Youngstown, Reverend David J. Bonnar.

== See also ==
- Catholic Church hierarchy
- Catholic Church in the United States
- Historical list of the Catholic bishops of the United States
- List of Catholic bishops of the United States
- Lists of patriarchs, archbishops, and bishops

== Episcopal succession ==
Catholic Church titles
Preceded by William Edwin Franklin	Bishop of Davenport; 2006-2017	Succeeded by Thomas Zinkula
