= Neal Buckon =

American Roman Catholic priest and bishop

His Excellency, The Most Reverend Neal James Buckon
- Auxiliary Bishop for the Military Services, USA; Titular Bishop of Vissalsa
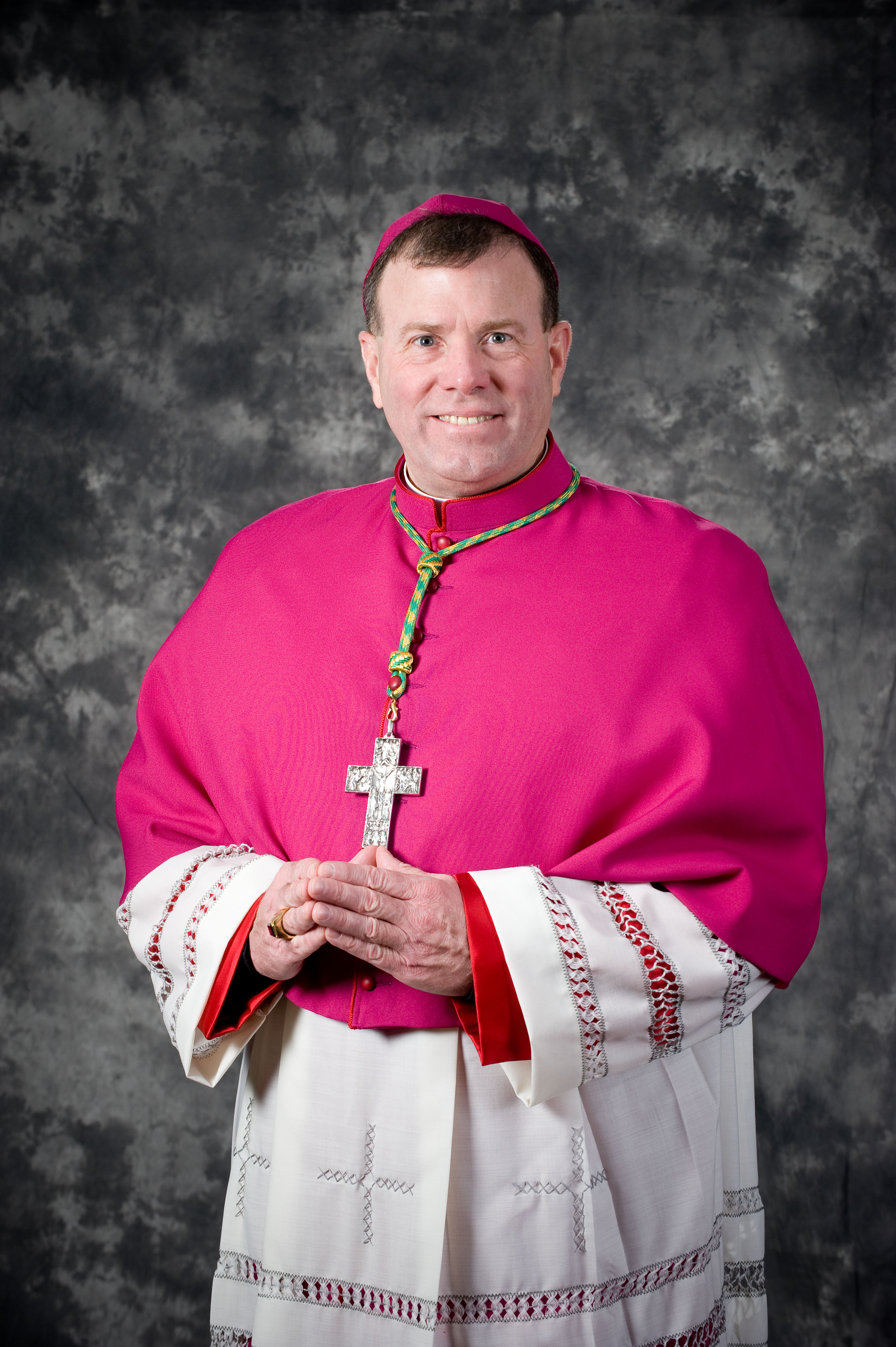
- Church: Roman Catholic Church
- See: Archdiocese for the Military Services, USA
- Appointed: January 3, 2011
- Installed: February 22, 2011
- Other post: Titular Bishop of Vissalsa

Orders
- Ordination: May 25, 1995 by Anthony Michael Pilla
- Consecration: February 22, 2011 by Timothy P. Broglio, Anthony Pilla, and Richard Lennon

Personal details
- Born: September 3, 1953 (age 72) Columbus, Ohio, US
- Education: John Carroll University; Cleveland State University; Borromeo College
- Motto: Opere et veritate (In action and truth)

Styles of Neal James Buckon
- Reference style: His Excellency; The Most Reverend
- Spoken style: Your Excellency
- Religious style: Bishop

Neal James Buckon (September 3, 1953) is an American prelate of the Roman Catholic Church who has been serving as an auxiliary bishop of the Archdiocese for the Military Services, USA since 2011.

== Biography ==
=== Early life ===
Neal Buckon was born on September 3, 1953, in Columbus, Ohio, to John and Rita Buckon. He has six siblings. Buckon attended Gesu Elementary School and Cathedral Latin High School in Chardon, Ohio. After graduating from high School, Buckon entered John Carroll University in University Heights, Ohio, receiving a Bachelor of Science in biology. While in college, he joined the Reserve Officers' Training Corps (ROTC).

=== Military service ===
After graduating from college, Buckon entered the US Army as an officer. During his seven years in the Army, he had the following assignments:

- Rifle platoon leader and weapons platoon leader with the 1st Armored Division in Erlangen, Germany
- Battalion S4 and company commander with the 24th Infantry Division at Fort Stewart, Georgia
- Platoon leader and company operations officer with the 28th Transportation Battalion in Mannheim, Germany
- Platoon Leader and transportation officer for the Allied Command Europe, Mobile Force (Land) (AMFL)

=== Preparation for priesthood ===
After leaving the Army, Buckon spent time traveling around the world. Returning to Ohio, he obtained a Bachelor of Arts degree in history from Cleveland State University. Deciding to become a priest, Buckon studied at Saint Mary's Seminary and Borromeo College, receiving a Bachelor of Arts degree in philosophy and a Master of Divinity degree.

=== Priesthood ===
Buckon was ordained a priest at the Cathedral of St. John the Evangelist in Cleveland, Ohio, by Bishop Anthony Michael Pilla for the Diocese of Cleveland on May 25, 1995. The diocese assigned Buckon as parochial vicar at St. Margaret Mary Parish in South Euclid, Ohio.

In 1996, Buckon was accepted as a chaplain into the United States Army Chaplain Corps. He left St. Margaret Mary in 1998 to go on active duty as a chaplain. His assignments included:

- 3rd Infantry Division in Fort Stewart (1998 to 2001)
- Army Central Command – Saudi Arabia in Riyadh, Saudi Arabia (2001 to 2002)
- Fort Stewart (2002 to 2003)
- Task Force Baghdad in Baghdad, Iraq (2003 to 2004)
- Heidelberg, German, (2004 to 2006)
- Fort Sill, Oklahoma (2006 to 2008)
- Eighth US Army in Seoul, Korea, (2008 to 2010)

After his deployment to South Korea, Buckon retired from the Chaplain Corps in 2010.

=== Auxiliary Bishop of the Military Services, USA ===
Buckon was appointed as an auxiliary bishop of the Military Services, USA as well as titular bishop of Vissalsa on January 3, 2011, by Pope Benedict XVI. Buckon was consecrated at the Basilica of the National Shrine of the Immaculate Conception in Washington, D.C., by Bishop Timothy Broglio on February 22, 2011, with Bishops Anthony Pilla and Richard Lennon acting as co-consecrators.

== See also ==
- Catholic Church hierarchy
- Catholic Church in the United States
- Historical list of the Catholic bishops of the United States
- Insignia of chaplain schools in the United States military
- List of Catholic bishops of the United States
- List of Catholic bishops of the United States: military service
- Lists of patriarchs, archbishops, and bishops
- Military chaplain
- Religious symbolism in the United States military
- United States military chaplains

== Episcopal succession ==
Catholic Church titles
Preceded by –	Auxiliary Bishop for the Military Services, USA; 2011 – Present	Succeeded by –
Preceded by Bernard Bober	Roman Catholic Titular See of Vissalsa; 2011 – Present	Succeeded by Incumbent
