= Michael G. Woost =

American bishop of the Catholic Church

His Excellency, The Most Reverend Michael Gerard Woost
- Auxiliary Bishop of Cleveland; Titular Bishop of Sertei
- Diocese: Cleveland
- Appointed: May 9, 2022
- Installed: August 4, 2022
- Other post: Titular Bishop of Sertei

Orders
- Ordination: June 9, 1984 by Anthony Pilla
- Consecration: August 4, 2022 by Edward C. Malesic, Roger William Gries, and Martin John Amos

Personal details
- Born: September 17, 1958 (age 67) Cleveland, Ohio, US
- Education: Saint Mary Seminary and Graduate School of Theology
- Motto: Reveal your presence

Styles of Michael Gerard Woost
- Reference style: His Excellency; The Most Reverend
- Spoken style: Your Excellency
- Religious style: Bishop

Michael Gerard Woost (born September 17, 1958) is an American bishop of the Catholic Church who has been serving as auxiliary bishop for the Diocese of Cleveland in Ohio since 2022.

== Biography ==
=== Early life ===
Michael Woost was born on September 17, 1958, in Cleveland, Ohio. He has two brothers who are also priests in Cleveland. He attended St. Ignatius High School in Cleveland.

Deciding to become a priest, Woost entered Borromeo Seminary in Wickliffe, Ohio. He graduated with a Bachelor of Arts in philosophy in 1980. Woost continued his preparation for the priesthood at Saint Mary Seminary and Graduate School of Theology in Wickliffe, Ohio receiving a Master of Divinity degree in 1984 and Master of Arts in systematic theology degree in 1986.

=== Priesthood ===
Woost was ordained to the priesthood by Bishop Anthony Pilla for the Diocese of Cleveland at the Cathedral of St. John the Evangelist in Cleveland on June 9, 1984.

After Woost's 1984 ordination, the diocese assigned him as parochial vicar at Immaculate Conception Parish in Madison, Ohio. In 1989, Pilla appointed him as director of vocations and priest in resident at the cathedral. Woost moved to Washington D.C. in 1995 to attend the Catholic University of America. He received a Licentiate in Sacred Theology in 2000.

Woost returned to Cleveland in 2000, when he was assigned as an assistant professor of sacramental and liturgical theology at Saint Mary. In early 2022, Bishop Edward C. Malesic appointed him as interim director of the diocesan Office of Worship.

=== Auxiliary Bishop of Cleveland ===
Pope Francis appointed Woost as an auxiliary bishop of Cleveland on May 9, 2022. On August 4, 2022, he was consecrated at the Cathedral of St. John the Evangelist as a bishop by Malesic, with Bishops Roger William Gries and Martin John Amos serving as co-consecrators. After his consecration, Woost continued to teach at Saint Mary.

== See also ==
- Catholic Church hierarchy
- Catholic Church in the United States
- Historical list of the Catholic bishops of the United States
- List of Catholic bishops of the United States
- Lists of patriarchs, archbishops, and bishops

== Episcopal succession ==
Catholic Church titles
Preceded by Roger William Gries	Auxiliary Bishop of Cleveland; 2022-Present	Succeeded by -
