= Roger William Gries =

His Excellency, The Most Reverend Roger W. Gries OSB
- Auxiliary Bishop Emeritus of Cleveland; Titular Bishop of Praesidium
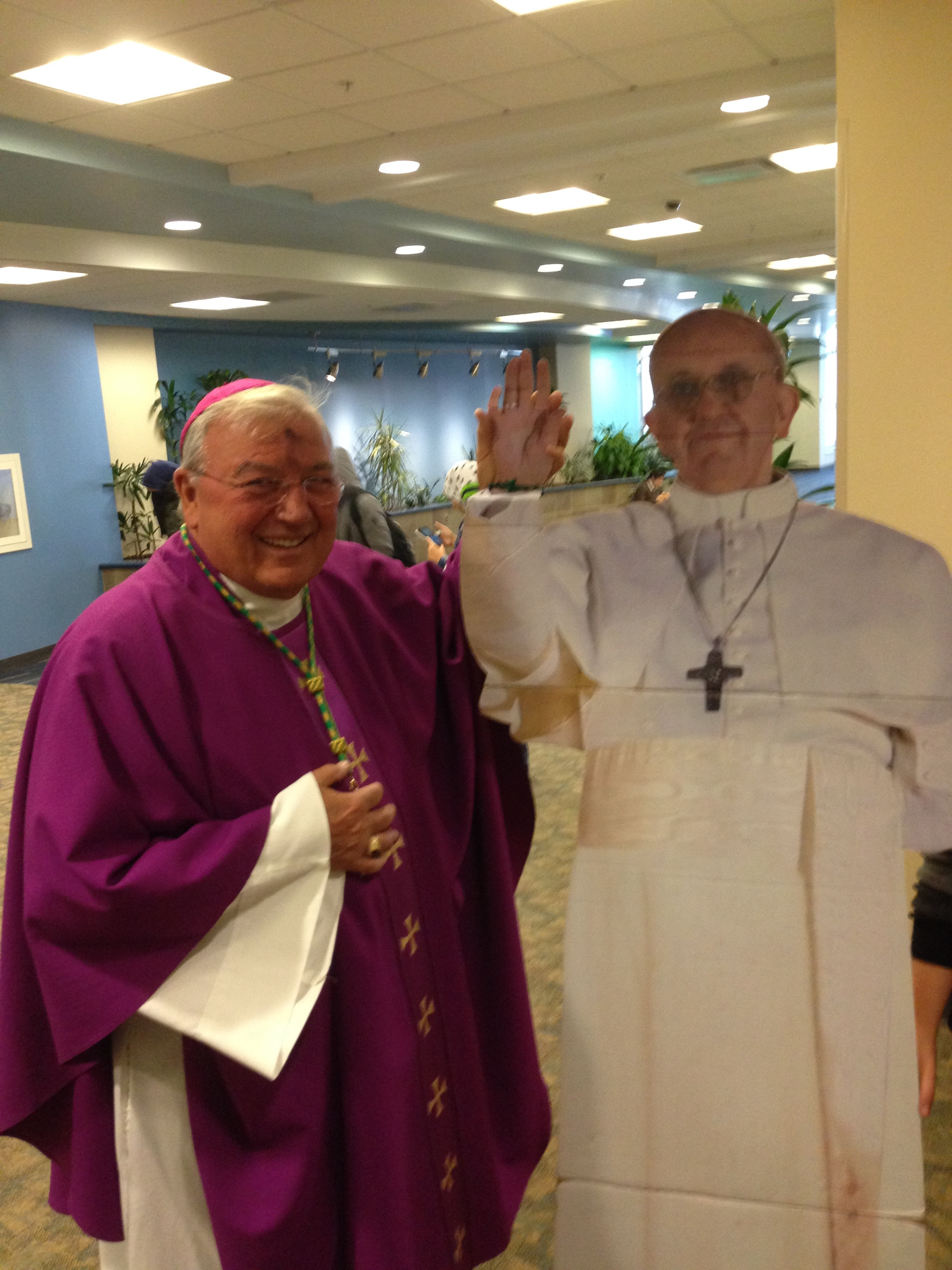
- Auxiliary Bishop Gries in February 2016
- Archdiocese: Cincinnati
- Diocese: Cleveland
- Appointed: April 13, 1982
- Installed: June 7, 2001
- Retired: November 1, 2013
- Other post: Titular Bishop of Praesidium

Orders
- Ordination: May 16, 1963 by Clarence Edward Elwell
- Consecration: June 7, 2001 by Anthony Michael Pilla, Alexander James Quinn, and Anthony Edward Pevec

Personal details
- Born: March 26, 1937 (age 89) Cleveland, Ohio, US
- Education: Loyola University Chicago

Styles of Roger William Gries
- Reference style: His Excellency; The Most Reverend
- Spoken style: Your Excellency
- Religious style: Bishop

Roger William Gries, OSB (born March 26, 1937) is an American prelate of the Roman Catholic Church.

Gries served as an auxiliary bishop of the Diocese of Cleveland in Ohio from 2001 to 2013. Previously, Gries was abbot of St. Andrew Abbey in Cleveland from 1981 to 2001.

== Biography ==
=== Early life ===
Roger Gries was born on March 26, 1937, in Cleveland, Ohio, to John and Dorothy (Soukup) Gries. He attended Benedictine High School in Cleveland, where he captained the football team. On July 11, 1957, Gries professed vows the Order of St. Benedict, entering St. Andrew Abbey in Cleveland.

=== Priesthood ===
Gries was ordained a priest at the Cathedral of St. John the Evangelist in Cleveland by Bishop Clarence Elwell on May 18, 1963 to the Order of St. Benedict. Following his ordination, Gries attended Loyola University Chicago, where he earned Bachelor of Education and Master of Education degrees. In 1964, the Order assigned him to Benedictine High School in Cleveland, serving there until 2001 as a teacher, coach, bus driver, principal and president.

On June 9, 1981, Gries was elected and confirmed as abbot of St. Andrew Abbey. He was blessed in August, 1981. Gries served as abbot for the next 20 years.

=== Auxiliary Bishop of Cleveland ===
On March 25, 2001, Pope John Paul II named Gries as titular bishop of Praesidium and as an auxiliary bishop of Cleveland. He was consecrated by Bishop Anthony Pilla on June 7, 2001, at the Cathedral of St. John the Evangelist with Auxiliary Bishops James Quinn and Anthony Pevec as the principal co-consecrators.

== Resignation ==
Gries's letter of resignation as auxiliary bishop of the Diocese of Cleveland was accepted by Pope Francis on Friday, November 1, 2013.

After his retirement, Gries performed confirmations, jubilees, funerals, and other celebrations and would visit inner city schools in Cleveland for mass and other activities. He is also involved with the We Give Catholic fundraiser, helping out Assumption Academy with campaigning

== See also ==
- Catholic Church hierarchy
- Catholic Church in the United States
- Historical list of the Catholic bishops of the United States
- List of Catholic bishops of the United States
- Lists of patriarchs, archbishops, and bishops

== Episcopal succession ==
Catholic Church titles
Preceded by -	Auxiliary Bishop of Cleveland; 2001-2013	Succeeded by Michael G. Woost
