= Praesidium Diolele =

Africa Proconsularis.

Praesidium Diolele, also known as just Præsidium, was a town of the Roman Province of Byzacena in North Africa during the Roman Empire.

The location of the town was lost for some time though it is tentatively identified with the ruins at Henchir-Somâa.

Fulgentius of Ruspe was from near this town.

The town was also the seat of a Christian bishopric, Praesidium, which survives today as an ancient suppressed and titular see of the Roman Catholic Church in North Africa. The bishopric dates from the Roman era and a bishop called Faustus is known from this time. He was exiled by the Vandal King Huneric in 484AD.

The current bishop is Roger William Gries of the United States.
