= John Patrick Farrelly =

American prelate (1856–1921)

His Excellency, The Most Reverend John Patrick Farrelly D.D.
- Bishop of Cleveland
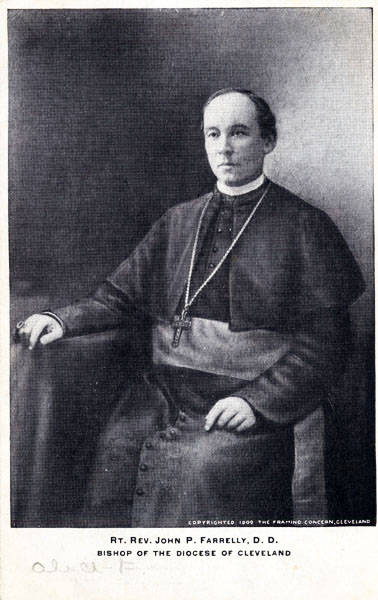
- Bishop Farrelly's consecration in 1909
- Church: Roman Catholic Church
- See: Diocese of Cleveland
- In office: June 13, 1909— February 12, 1921
- Predecessor: Ignatius Frederick Horstmann
- Successor: Joseph Schrembs

Orders
- Ordination: May 22, 1880 by Raffaele Monaco La Valletta
- Consecration: May 1, 1909 by Girolamo Maria Gotti

Personal details
- Born: March 15, 1856 Memphis, Tennessee, USA
- Died: February 12, 1921 (aged 64) Knoxville, Tennessee, USA
- Education: St. Mary's College; Georgetown University; Notre-Dame de la Paix University; Pontifical North American College

John Patrick Farrelly (March 15, 1856 – February 12, 1921) was an American prelate of the Roman Catholic Church. He served as bishop of the Diocese of Cleveland in Ohio from 1909 until his death in 1921.

== Biography ==
=== Early life ===
John Farrelly was born on March 15, 1856, in Memphis, Tennessee to John and Martha (née Clay) Farrelly. His father was a member of the Tennessee General Assembly, and his grandfather was one of the authors of the original Arkansas Constitution.

He and his parents moved to Little Rock, Arkansas, and later to Kentucky (1868), where the younger Farrelly attended St. Mary's College. After studying at Georgetown University in Washington, D.C., he entered Notre-Dame de la Paix University at Namur, Belgium, in 1873. He completed his studies at the Pontifical North American College in Rome, obtaining a Doctor of Sacred Theology degree.

=== Priesthood ===
Farrelly was ordained to the priesthood for the Diocese of Nashville in Rome by Cardinal Raffaele La Valletta on May 22, 1880. After touring Egypt and Palestine, Farrelly returned to Tennessee in 1882

Back in Nashville, Farrelly was appointed a curate at the Cathedral of the Incarnation; he was later named as its pastor He was named chancellor of the diocese in 1883. Farrelly returned to Rome in 1887, becoming secretary of the American bishops there in September 1887. While in Rome, he served as spiritual director of the North American College from 1893 until 1909.

=== Bishop of Cleveland ===
On March 18, 1909, Farrelly was appointed the fourth bishop of Cleveland by Pope Pius X. He received his episcopal consecration in Rome on May 1, 1909, from Cardinal Girolamo Gotti, with Bishops John Morris and Thomas Kennedy serving as co-consecrators. He was installed at St. John's Cathedral in Cleveland on June 13, 1909.

During his 12-year-long tenure as bishop, Farrelly improved the parochial school system; organized Catholic Charities; and erected 47 churches and schools, including Cathedral Latin High School on 107th Street between Euclid and Carnegie Avenues. During World War I, he was appointed by Cleveland Mayor Harry L. Davis to the Cleveland War Commission. Farrelly also ordered English to be spoken at all German churches and schools in the diocese.

=== Death and legacy ===
John Farrelly died on February 12, 1921, from pneumonia in Knoxville, Tennessee, at age 64. He is buried in the crypt beneath the main altar of St. John's Cathedral in Cleveland.

Catholic Church titles
Preceded by Ignatius Frederick Horstmann	Bishop of Cleveland; 1909–1921	Succeeded by Joseph Schrembs
