= Ignatius Frederick Horstmann =

American prelate

His Excellency, The Most Reverend Ignatius Frederick Horstmann D.D.
- Bishop of Cleveland
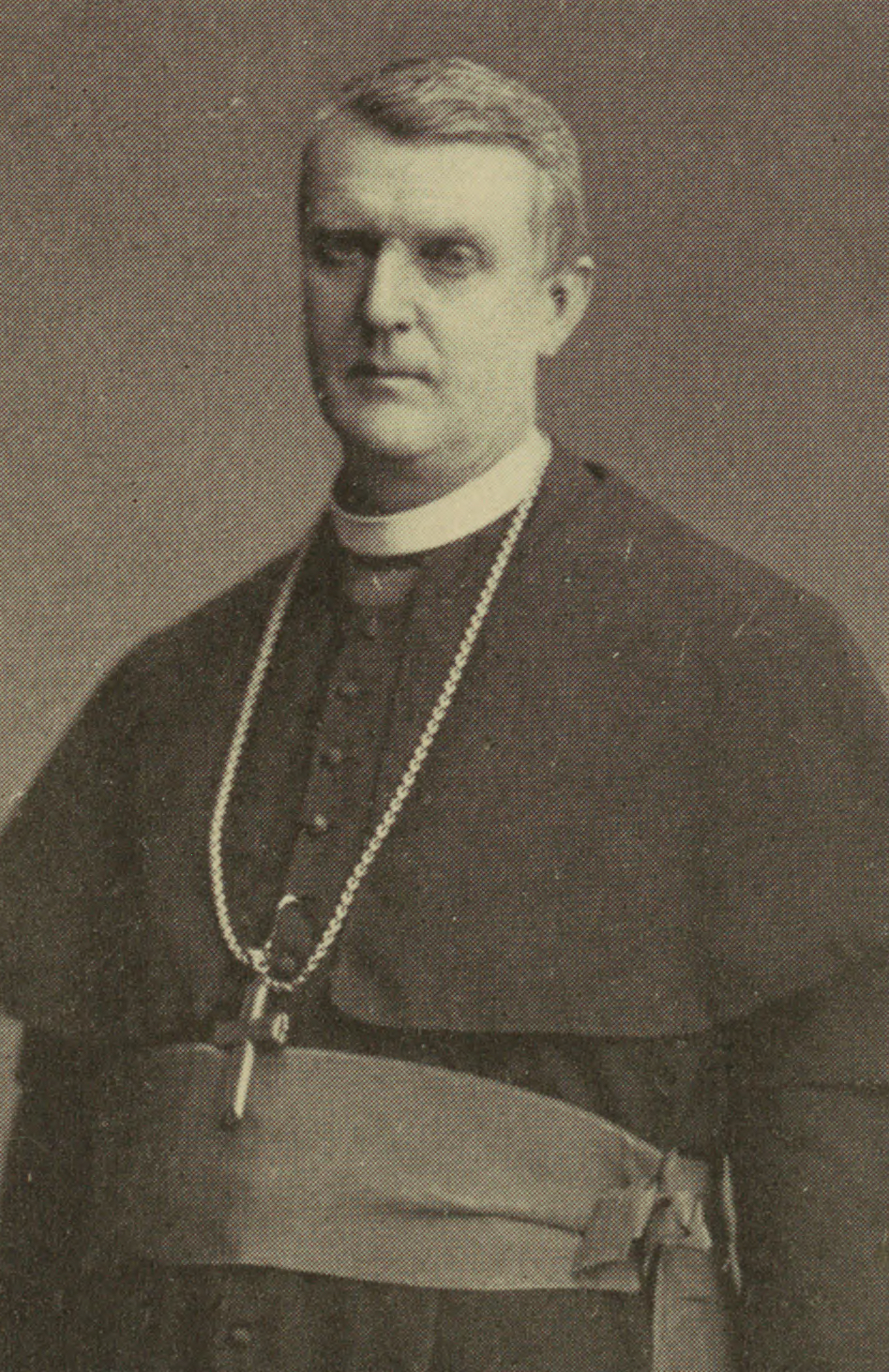
- Church: Roman Catholic Church
- See: Diocese of Cleveland
- In office: February 25, 1892— May 13, 1908
- Predecessor: Richard Gilmour
- Successor: John Patrick Farrelly

Orders
- Ordination: June 10, 1865 by Costantino Patrizi Naro
- Consecration: February 25, 1892 by William Henry Elder

Personal details
- Born: December 16, 1840 Philadelphia, Pennsylvania
- Died: May 13, 1908 (aged 67) Canton, Ohio
- Buried: Cathedral of St. John the Evangelist
- Motto: Sustine et abstine (Sustain and abstain)

Ignatius Frederick Horstmann (December 16, 1840 – May 13, 1908) was an American prelate of the Roman Catholic Church. He served as bishop of the Diocese of Cleveland in Ohio from 1892 until his death in 1908.

== Biography ==
=== Early life ===
Ignatius Horstmann was born on December 16, 1840, in Philadelphia, Pennsylvania, to Frederick and Catherine (née Weber) Horstmann. After graduating from Central High School, he attended St. Joseph's College and St. Charles Borromeo Seminary, all in Philadelphia. In 1860, Horstmann went to Rome to attend the Pontifical North American College, one of its first students.

=== Priesthood ===
While in Rome, Horstmann was ordained to the priesthood for the Archdiocese of Philadelphia by Cardinal Costantino Naro on February 10, 1865. He earned his Doctor of Divinity degree in Rome in 1866.

Upon his return to Philadelphia in 1866, Horstmann became professor of philosophy, German language, and Hebrew language at St. Charles Seminary. He was named pastor of St. Mary's Parish in Philadelphia in 1877, and chancellor of the archdiocese in 1885. Horstmann also served as assistant editor of the American Catholic Quarterly Review and president of the American Catholic Historical Society.

=== Bishop of Cleveland ===
On December 14, 1891, Horstmann was appointed as the third bishop of the Diocese of Cleveland by Pope Leo XIII. He received his episcopal consecration on February 25, 1892, from Archbishop William Elder, with Bishops William O'Hara and Silas Chatard serving as co-consecrators, at the Cathedral of Sts. Peter and Paul in Philadelphia.

In the early 1890s, Horstmann faced a schism within the diocese. Polish parishioners at St. Stanislaus Parish in Cleveland, led by Reverend Anton Kolaszewski, were demanding more control over their parish with more sensitivity to their customs. In 1892, Horstmann relieved Kolaszewski of his post. When the new pastor arrived for his first mass, a brawl broke out among parishioners. In 1894, many parishioners started a new independent parish, Immaculate Heart of Mary, with Kolaszewski as pastor; Horstmann excommunicated all of them. Years later, after the deaths of both men, the new church returned to the diocese.

In 1907, Horstmann faced a second schism with Polish Catholics. After removing Reverend Casimir Zakrekac as pastor of St. Vitus Parish in Cleveland, he faced violent protests. After the parish rectory was stoned, the replacement priest was forced to flee. Over 100 people were arrested. On September 22, 1907, 5,000 Polish protesters marched on Horstmann's residence, demanding Zakrekac's reinstatement and home rule for St. Vitus.

As bishop, Horstmann erected 22 ethnic parishes, but faced opposition from nationalist schismatic groups, including the Polish National Catholic Church. He founded the following institutions in the diocese:

- Loyola High School in Cleveland (1902),
- St. John's College in Toledo (1898),
- St. Anthony Home for Working Boys in Cleveland.
- The Catherine Horstmann Home in Cleveland for homeless women.

He encouraged the missionary movement, and established of the first band of missionaries (headed by Rev. Walter Elliott) in any diocese of the United States. He also expanded Catholic hospitals and orphanages, endorsed compulsory parochial schools, and served as a trustee of the Catholic University of America in Washington, D.C.

=== Death and legacy ===
Horstmann died from heart disease in Canton on May 13, 1908, at age 67. He was described the Catholic Encyclopedia as "a zealous pastor of souls, a wise and prudent ruler, a fearless defender of truth."

Catholic Church titles
Preceded by Richard Gilmour	Bishop of Cleveland; 1892–1908	Succeeded by John Patrick Farrelly
