= Vissalsa =

Roman Catholic titular see

The diocese of Vissalsa (Latin: Dioecesis Vissalsensis) is a suppressed and titular see of the Roman Catholic Church, in the province of Mauretania Caesariensis. The seat of the bishopric is not known to history.

The only known bishop of this African diocese is Saturnino, who took part in the synod assembled in Carthage in 484 by King Huneric of the Vandal Kingdom, after which Saturnino was exiled, possibly to Vandal-controlled Sicily.

Today Vissalsa survives as a titular bishopric and the current bishop is Neal Buckon, auxiliary bishop of the military ordination in the United States.
