= Anthony Edward Pevec =

Auxiliary bishop of the Diocese of Cleveland (1925–2014)

His Excellency, Most Reverend Anthony E. Pevec
- Auxiliary Bishop of Cleveland
- See: Titular See of Mercia
- Appointed: April 13, 1982
- In office: July 2, 1982–September 1, 2002

Orders
- Ordination: April 29, 1950 by Edward Hoban
- Consecration: July 2, 1982 by Anthony Michael Pilla

Personal details
- Born: April 16, 1925 Cleveland, Ohio, US
- Died: December 14, 2014 (aged 89) Wickliffe, Ohio, US

Anthony Edward Pevec (April 16, 1925 – December 14, 2014) was an American prelate of the Catholic Church in the United States. He served as an auxiliary bishop of the Diocese of Cleveland in Ohio from 1982 to 2002.

== Biography ==
=== Early life ===
Anthony Pevec was born on April 16, 1925 in Cleveland, Ohio. He attended Catholic primary and secondary schools in the city. Deciding to become a priest, Pevec attended Sacred Heart Major Seminary in Detroit, Michigan, and St. Mary Seminary in Wickliffe, Ohio.He later received advanced degrees from John Carroll University and Case Western University, both in Cleveland

==== Priesthood ====
Pevec was ordained a priest for the Diocese of Cleveland by Bishop Edward Hoban at the Cathedral of St. John the Evangelist in Cleveland on April 29, 1950. After his ordination, the diocese assigned Hoban as parochial vicar at St. Mary Parish in Elyria, Ohio. They later moved him to St. Lawrence Parish in Cleveland. Hoban in 1953 started teaching at the St. Borromeo High School Seminary in Wickliffe. In 1971, the diocese appointed Hoban as pastor of St. Vitus Parish in Cleveland. He was named in 1979 as rector of St. Borromeo.

=== Auxiliary Bishop of Cleveland ===
On April 13, 1982 Pope John Paul II named Pevec as the titular bishop of Mercia and auxiliary bishop of Cleveland. He was consecrated by Bishop Anthony Michael Pilla at the Cathedral of St. John the Evangelist on July 2, 1982. The principal co-consecrators were Archbishop Joseph Bernadin of Cincinnati and Bishop William Michael Cosgrove of Belleville.

As auxiliary bishop, Hoban served as vicar general and vicar of the Eastern Region of the diocese. He spoke out against euthanasia, gambling and capital punishment during his tenure. He urged Catholics to reject racism and to welcome migrants.

=== Retirement ===
Pevec served the diocese as an auxiliary bishop for nearly 19 years when John Paul II accepted his resignation on April 3, 2001. Pevec officially retired on September 1, 2002.He was inducted into the Cleveland International Hall of Fame in 2013. Pevec died on December 14, 2014, at age 89, at the Diocesan Center for Pastoral Leadership in Wickliffe. He was buried at Calvary Cemetery in Cleveland.

Catholic Church titles
Preceded by –	Auxiliary Bishop of Cleveland; 1982–2001	Succeeded by –
