= St. John's College, Cleveland =

Coordinates: 41.502836°N 81.688419°W

St. John's College in Cleveland, Ohio, originally known as Sisters' College, was a school for teachers and nurses established in 1928 by the Roman Catholic Diocese of Cleveland. In fall 1974, enrollment included 619 women and 51 men. The school closed in 1975. The facilities were then merged with the adjacent St. John's Cathedral, while its nursing program moved to Ursuline College.

A school of the same name in Cleveland was founded by Bishop Louis Rappe in 1854.

Notable alumni include Judy Robson, Majority Leader of the Wisconsin State Senate (2007-), Michael Pennock (1945–2009), Catholic author, Diana Kupchella, (1948-), RN, BSN, MEd, MS, JD, retired Air Force Colonel, military nurse who flew with returning Vietnam POWs in "Operation Homecoming."
