= Judy Robson =

American politician (born 1939)

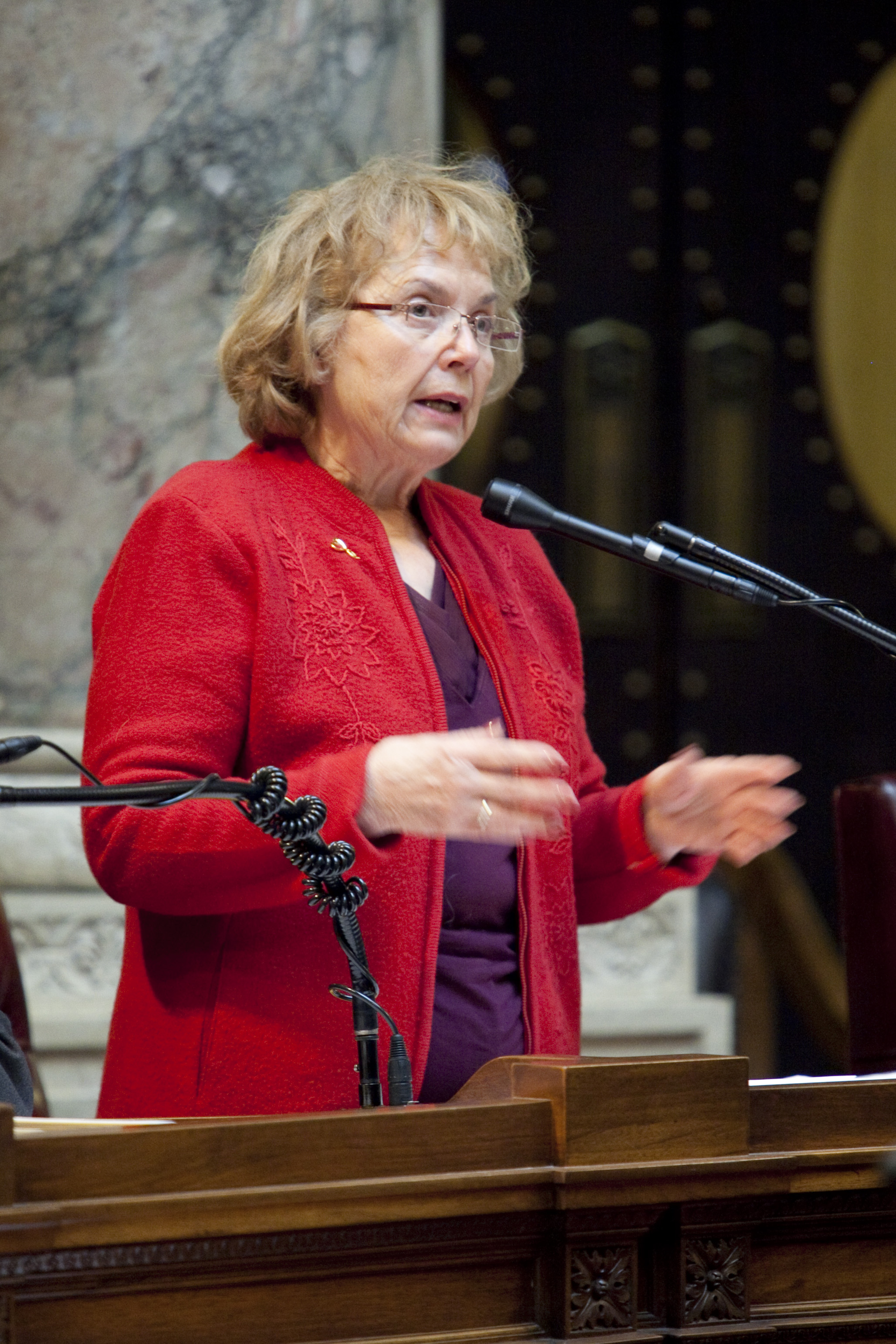
- Robson in 2009

Majority Leader of the Wisconsin Senate
- In office January 1, 2007 – October 24, 2007
- Preceded by: Dale Schultz
- Succeeded by: Russ Decker

Minority Leader of the Wisconsin Senate
- In office January 3, 2005 – January 1, 2007
- Preceded by: Jon Erpenbach
- Succeeded by: Scott Fitzgerald

Member of the Wisconsin Senate from the 15th district
- In office January 4, 1999 – January 3, 2011
- Preceded by: Timothy Weeden
- Succeeded by: Timothy Cullen

Member of the Wisconsin State Assembly from the 45th district
- In office June 17, 1987 – January 4, 1999
- Preceded by: Timothy Weeden
- Succeeded by: Dan Schooff

Personal details
- Born: November 21, 1939 (age 86) Cleveland, Ohio, U.S.
- Party: Democratic
- Education: St. John's College (BSN); University of Wisconsin–Madison (MA)
- Profession: Registered Nurse

Judith Biros Robson (born November 21, 1939) is a retired American nurse, nursing instructor, and Democratic politician from Beloit, Wisconsin. She served 12 years in the Wisconsin Senate and 12 years in the Wisconsin State Assembly, representing Rock County. She was the first female Democratic Senate majority leader in Wisconsin history.

== Biography ==
Robson was born in Cleveland, Ohio, and now lives in Beloit, Wisconsin. She received a B.S.N. degree from St. John's College in Cleveland, and a master's degree from the University of Wisconsin–Madison in 1976. She is a registered nurse. Before being elected to public office, Robson worked as a nurse and as an instructor, primarily at Blackhawk Technical College.

Robson was elected to the Wisconsin State Assembly in June 1987 in a special election to replace Timothy Weeden (who had been elected to the state Senate). She was reelected to her seat several times and served in that house until 1999. In 1998, she was elected to the Wisconsin Senate and reelected in 2002. Robson was selected by her peers to be the Senate Democratic leader in 2005. She was reelected in 2006 and became the Majority Leader of the Wisconsin State Senate in 2007 following the Democratic takeover of the Senate in the 2006 elections. The day after passage of the 2007-2008 state budget, the Senate Democratic Caucus elected Russ Decker to replace Robson as Majority Leader.

Robson did not seek reelection in 2010 and was succeeded by Timothy Cullen, who had held the senate seat prior to Tim Weeden.

== Committee assignments ==
- Committee for review of Administrative Rules
- Joint committee for review of Administrative Rules
- Committee on Education, Ethics and Elections
- Committee on Health, Children, Families, Aging and Long Term Care
- Special Committee on Improving Wisconsin's Fiscal Management
- Special Committee on The Public Health System's Response to Terrorism and Public Health Emergencies (chair)
- Wisconsin Artistic Endowment Foundation
- Women's Council

Wisconsin State Assembly
Preceded by Timothy Weeden	Member of the Wisconsin State Assembly from the 45th district June 17, 1987 – January 4, 1999	Succeeded by Dan Schooff
Wisconsin Senate
Preceded by Timothy Weeden	Member of the Wisconsin Senate from the 15th district January 4, 1999 – January 3, 2011	Succeeded by Timothy Cullen
Preceded by Jon Erpenbach	Minority Leader of the Wisconsin Senate; January 3, 2005 – January 1, 2007	Succeeded by Scott Fitzgerald
Preceded by Dale Schultz	Majority Leader of the Wisconsin Senate; January 1, 2007 – October 24, 2007	Succeeded by Russ Decker
