= Richard Lennon =

American Catholic bishop (1947–2019)

His Excellency, The Most Reverend Richard Gerald Lennon
- Bishop of Cleveland
- Church: Catholic Church
- See: Diocese of Cleveland
- Appointed: April 4, 2006
- Installed: May 15, 2006
- Term ended: December 28, 2016
- Predecessor: Anthony Michael Pilla
- Successor: Nelson Jesus Perez
- Previous posts: Auxiliary Bishop of Boston (2001 - 2006)

Orders
- Ordination: May 19, 1973 by Humberto Sousa Medeiros
- Consecration: September 14, 2001 by Bernard Francis Law, Lawrence Joseph Riley, William Murphy

Personal details
- Born: March 26, 1947 Arlington, Massachusetts, USA
- Died: October 29, 2019 (aged 72) Cleveland, Ohio, USA
- Education: Saint John's Seminary; Boston College
- Motto: Diligamus Nos Invicem (Love each other)

Styles of Richard Gerard Lennon
- Reference style: His Excellency; The Most Reverend
- Spoken style: Your Excellency
- Religious style: Bishop

Richard Gerard Lennon (March 26, 1947 – October 29, 2019) was an American Catholic prelate who served as Bishop of Cleveland from 2006 to 2016. He previously served as an auxiliary bishop for the Archdiocese of Boston from 2001 to 2006.

== Biography ==
=== Early life and education ===
Richard Lennon was born on March 26, 1947, in Arlington, Massachusetts. Lennon's father Albert was the town's deputy fire chief. Lennon attended St. James the Apostle grammar school in St. James Parish in Arlington, where he was an altar boy. In 1965, Lennon graduated from Matignon High School in Cambridge, Massachusetts, where he was a member of the National Honor Society.

Lennon attended Boston College, as mathematics major. After two years, he transferred to St. John's Seminary in Boston. Lennon graduated from St. John's in 1969 with a Bachelor of Philosophy degree. Lennon received a Master of Sacramental Theology degree from St. John's in 1973.

=== Priesthood ===
Lennon was ordained to the priesthood for the Archdiocese of Boston by Archbishop Humberto Medeiros on May 19, 1973. From 1973 to 1982 he served at St. Mary of the Nativity Parish in Scituate, Massachusetts, and from 1982 to 1988 at St. Mary's Parish in West Quincy, Massachusetts. He was awarded a Master of Church History degree in 1984 from St. John's,

In 1988, Lennon was appointed as assistant for canonical affairs for the archdiocese, working for Auxiliary Bishop William Murphy. Lennon later criticized Murphy for funding a job placement program for priests accused of sexual abuse of minors. In 1999, Lennon was appointed seminary rector.

In 2000, while working as an aide to Cardinal Bernard Law, Lennon wrote a letter certifying that Paul Shanley, an archdiocesan priest, was in good standing for a transfer. This was despite Shanley's extensive record of sexual activity with boys. Shanley was convicted in 2005 of child rape.

In June 2001, Lennon was invested as a knight in both the Sovereign Military Order of Malta and the Equestrian Order of the Holy Sepulchre of Jerusalem.

=== Auxiliary Bishop of Boston ===
On June 29, 2001, Pope John Paul II named Lennon as an auxiliary bishop of the Archdiocese of Boston. He was consecrated on September 14, 2001, by Cardinal Law.

In December 2002, Law resigned as Archbishop of Boston due to an ongoing sexual abuse scandal in the archdiocese. Lennon served as the apostolic administrator of the archdiocese from Law's resignation until the accession of Law's successor, Archbishop Sean O'Malley, in July 2003. O'Malley appointed Lennon in 2003 as vicar general, a position he held until 2006. In a documentary on the clergy sexual abuse and church closings in the Boston area that aired in 2007 on PBS's Frontline, Lennon tried to prevent the filming of "exterior shots of the archdiocese's chancery building".

=== Bishop of Cleveland ===
On April 5, 2006, Pope Benedict XVI named Lennon as the tenth bishop of the Diocese of Cleveland. He was installed on May 15, 2006.

In June 2008, after allowing the diocesan reconfiguration process inherited from his predecessor to inform his decision, Lennon announced plans to close at least 30 parishes in the cities of Cleveland and Lorain, including older parishes in Cleveland's inner ring suburbs. Parishioners and members of Cleveland's City Council attacked his plan, including Michael Polensek of Ward 11. Critics have pointed out that several of the churches to be closed enjoyed steady, if limited, monthly incomes, and that several of these churches have a politically liberal orientation. However, a portion of these churches were also in need of major capital investment after years of delayed maintenance, which was not always readily evident when examined from the outside.

Significant criticism of the parish cluster organization and the decision-making process associated with the closing of parishes followed. Some Catholics in the diocese requested Vatican oversight of Lennon in 2009, seeking review by the Congregation for Bishops. Lennon presided at 78 Masses that marked the closing, merging, and opening of parishes over the next 14 months.

In April 2010, Lennon faced a schism in the diocese. That year, the diocese announced the closing St. Peter Parish in Cleveland. Its pastor, Reverend Robert Marrone and many of his parishioners decided to form without Lennon's approval a new congregation, the Community of St. Peter. In September 2010, after the Vatican ruled that the closing of St. Peter violated canon law, Lennon reopened it with a new pastors. However, many of the former parishioners now at Community of St. Peter, declined to rejoin that parish. On March 4, 2013, Lennon excommunicated Marrone latae setentiae (automatically by committing the offense) for having disobeyed him by participating in the schism.

In July 2011, due to the discord created by the parish closings, Lennon requested that the Vatican conduct an apostolic visit to the diocese to assess the situation. The Vatican agreed and dispatched the bishop emeritus of the Diocese of Trenton, John Smith, to conduct the investigation. In March 2012, the Vatican ordered the diocese to reopen 13 of the 50 parishes that had appealed their closing to the Congregation for the Clergy.

=== Resignation and legacy ===
On February 4, 2016, Lennon underwent an emergency cardiac procedure. In November 2016, he submitted a request to the pope for early retirement. Pope Francis accepted his resignation as bishop of the Diocese of Cleveland on December 28, 2016. That same day, Lennon revealed his recent diagnosis of vascular dementia.

Richard Lennon died in Cleveland, Ohio, on October 29, 2019. After a funeral mass at the Cathedral of St. John the Evangelist in Cleveland, he was entombed in the cathedral's mortuary chapel.

Catholic Church titles
Preceded by Anthony Michael Pilla	Bishop of Cleveland; 2006–2016	Succeeded by Nelson Jesus Perez
Preceded by -	Auxiliary Bishop of Boston; 2001–2006	Succeeded by -
