= Clarence George Issenmann =

American prelate

His Excellency, The Most Reverend Clarence George Issenmann S.T.D.
- Bishop of Cleveland; Titular Bishop of Phytea
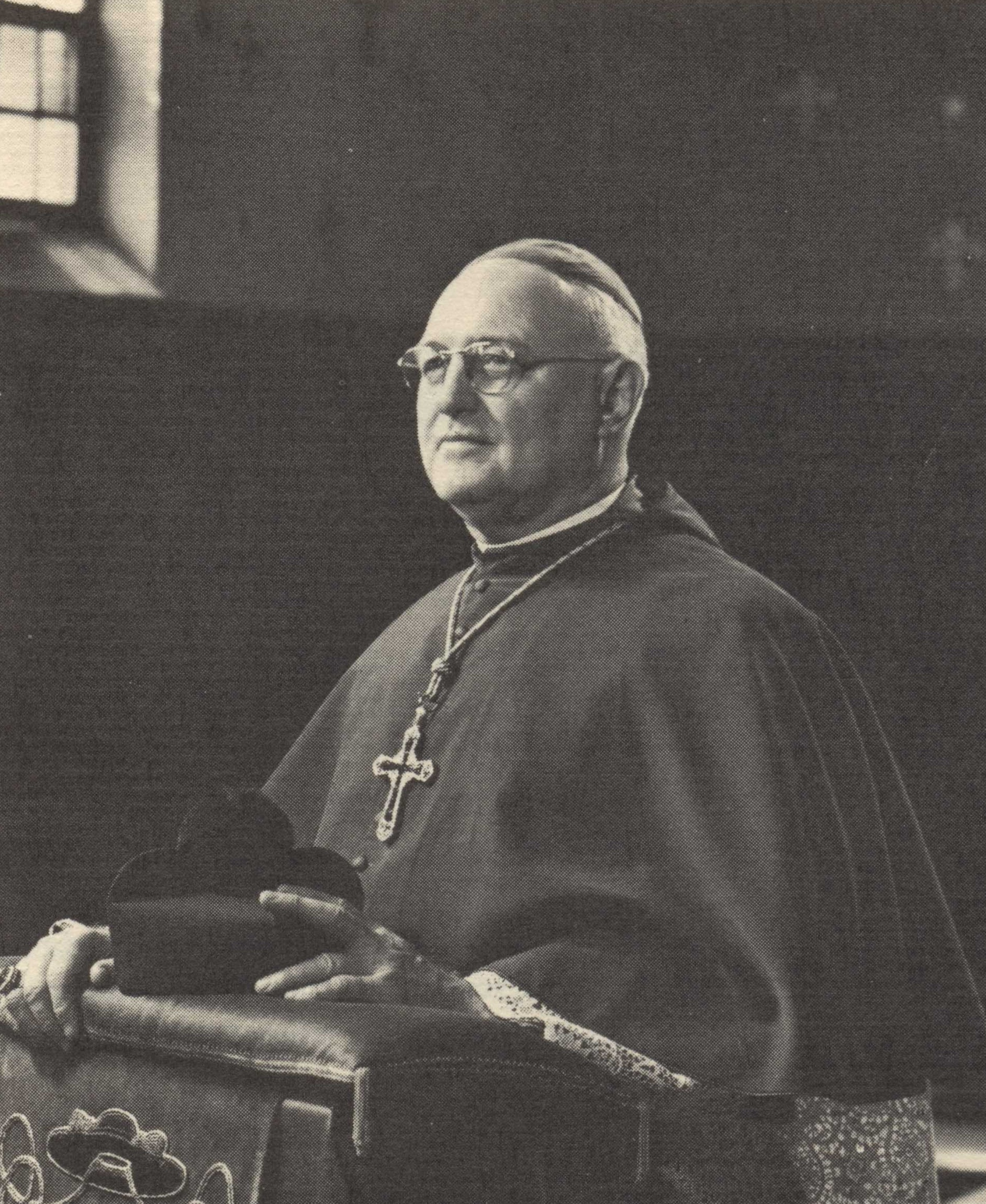
- Church: Roman Catholic Church
- See: Diocese of Cleveland
- In office: September 22, 1966– June 5, 1974
- Predecessor: Edward Francis Hoban
- Successor: James Aloysius Hickey
- Previous posts: Auxiliary Bishop of Cincinnati (1954-1957); Bishop of Columbus (1957-1966)

Orders
- Ordination: June 29, 1932 by John T. McNicholas
- Consecration: May 25, 1954 by Karl Joseph Alter, Urban John Vehr and George John Rehring

Personal details
- Born: May 30, 1907 Hamilton, Ohio, USA
- Died: July 27, 1982 (aged 75) Cleveland, Ohio, USA
- Buried: Resurrection Chapel, St. John's Cathedral, Cleveland
- Education: University of Fribourg; Pontifical University of St. Thomas Aquinas; Regis University
- Motto: Deo animas (Our souls go to God)

Clarence George Issenmann (May 30, 1907 – July 27, 1982) was an American prelate of the Roman Catholic Church. He served as an auxiliary bishop of the Archdiocese of Cincinnati in Ohio from 1954 to 1957, as bishop of the Diocese of Columbus in Ohio from 1957 to 1964, and as bishop of the Diocese of Cleveland in Ohio from 1966 to 1974.

== Biography ==
=== Early life ===
Clarence Issenmann was born on May 30, 1907, in Hamilton, Ohio, the only child of Innocent J. Issenmann (a grocer) and Amelia L. (née Stricker) Issenmann. Clarence Issenmann worked as delivery boy and meat cutter for his father as young man. He attended St. Ann's School and then Hamilton Catholic High School, both in Hamilton.

After graduating from high school, Issenmann entered St. Joseph's College in Rensselaer, Indiana. He then returned to Cincinnati to study at St. Gregory's and Mount St. Mary of the West seminaries.

=== Priesthood ===
Issenmann was ordained to the priesthood for the Archdiocese of Cincinnati by Archbishop John McNicholas on June 29, 1932, in the chapel of Mt. St. Mary's Norwood campus. After his ordination, Issenmann continued his studies at the University of Fribourg in Fribourg, Switzerland, obtaining his Licentiate of Philosophy. He then entered the Pontifical University of St. Thomas Aquinas in Rome, Receiving a Doctor of Theology degree. After returning to the United States, Issenmann entered Regis University in Denver, Colorado, where he received a Doctor of Journalism degree. While in Denver, Issenmann also worked on the staff of the Denver Register.

In 1938, Issenmann was appointed editor of the archdiocesan newspaper, the Catholic Telegraph Register. He was named as a professor of theology in 1942 at Mt. St. Mary Seminary. The Vatican elevated Issenmann to the rank of monsignor in 1943. He was named chancellor and vicar general in 1945.

=== Auxiliary Bishop of Cincinnati ===
On March 24, 1954, Issenmann was appointed auxiliary bishop of Cincinnati and titular bishop of Phytea by Pope Pius XII. He received his episcopal consecration at St. Monica Church in Cincinnati on May 25, 1954, from Archbishop Karl Alter, with Archbishop Urban Vehr and Bishop George Rehring serving as co-consecrators.

=== Bishop of Columbus ===
Pope Pius XII appointed Issenmann as the sixth bishop of Columbus on December 5, 1957. During his tenure in Columbus, Issenmann established the Diocesan Development Fund so as to supply for the expansion of the diocese, which added eight parishes and six high schools under Issenmann. He also found a new building to house diocesan offices, and offered a televised mass every week. Attending the Second Vatican Council in Rome from 1962 to 1965, he also served as the assistant episcopal chair of lay organizations for the National Catholic Welfare Conference.

=== Coadjutor Bishop and Bishop of Cleveland ===
Pope Paul VI appointed Issenmann as coadjutor bishop of Cleveland and titular bishop of Filaca on October 7, 1964. He was installed on February 2, 1965, at St. John's Cathedral in Cleveland. Issenmann automatically succeeded Bishop Edward Hoban as the seventh bishop of Cleveland on September 22, 1966. As bishop, he constructed the following schools in the diocese:

- Villa Angela Academy in Cleveland,
- Lake Catholic High School in Mentor
- Lorain Catholic High School in Lorain
- St. Vincent-St. Mary High School in Akron

In November 1968, Issenmann asked all adults attending mass in the diocese to sign petitions of support for Humanae vitae, Paul VI's 1969 encyclical against artificial birth control. Issenmann was the only bishop in the country to make that request of parishioners.

=== Retirement and legacy ===
After suffering several strokes, Issenmann requested early retirement from the pope. His resignation as bishop of Cleveland was accepted by Paul VI on June 5, 1974. After his retirement, Issenmann continued to live in Cleveland. Clarence Issenmann died in Cleveland on July 27, 1982, at age 75. He was interred in the Resurrection Chapel in St. John's Cathedral.

Catholic Church titles
Preceded by Michael Joseph Ready	Bishop of Columbus; 1957–1964	Succeeded by John Joseph Carberry
Preceded by Edward Francis Hoban	Bishop of Cleveland; 1966–1974	Succeeded by James Aloysius Hickey
