= Praesidium (bishopric) =

Titular see of the Catholic Church in Tunisia

The diocese of Presidio (Latin: Dioecesis Praesidiensis) is a suppressed and titular see of the Catholic Church.

== History ==
Africa Proconsularis (125 AD)

Presidium, identifiable with ruins at Henchir-Somâa in present-day Tunisia, is an ancient episcopal seat of the Roman province of Byzacena.

There are two bishops known from this diocese.

- The Leonatist a Donatist, who took part in the Carthage conference of 411, which brought together the Catholic and Donatist bishops of Roman North Africa.
- Fausto attended the synod gathered in Carthage by the Vandal king Huneric in 484, after which Fausto was exiled.

Today, Presidio survives as a titular see; the current titular bishop is Roger William Gries, former auxiliary bishop of Cleveland.

=== bishops ===
- Leonzio † (mentioned in 411) (Donatist bishop)
- Fausto † (mentioned in 484)
- Giuseppe Carata † (May 17, 1965 - April 8, 1967 appointed titular bishop of Canne)
- Władysław Miziołek † (19 February 1969 - 12 May 2000 deceased)
- Roger William Gries, since 3 April 2001
