= Somâa =

Coordinates: 36°33′N 10°47′E

Somâa الصمعة
- Commune and town
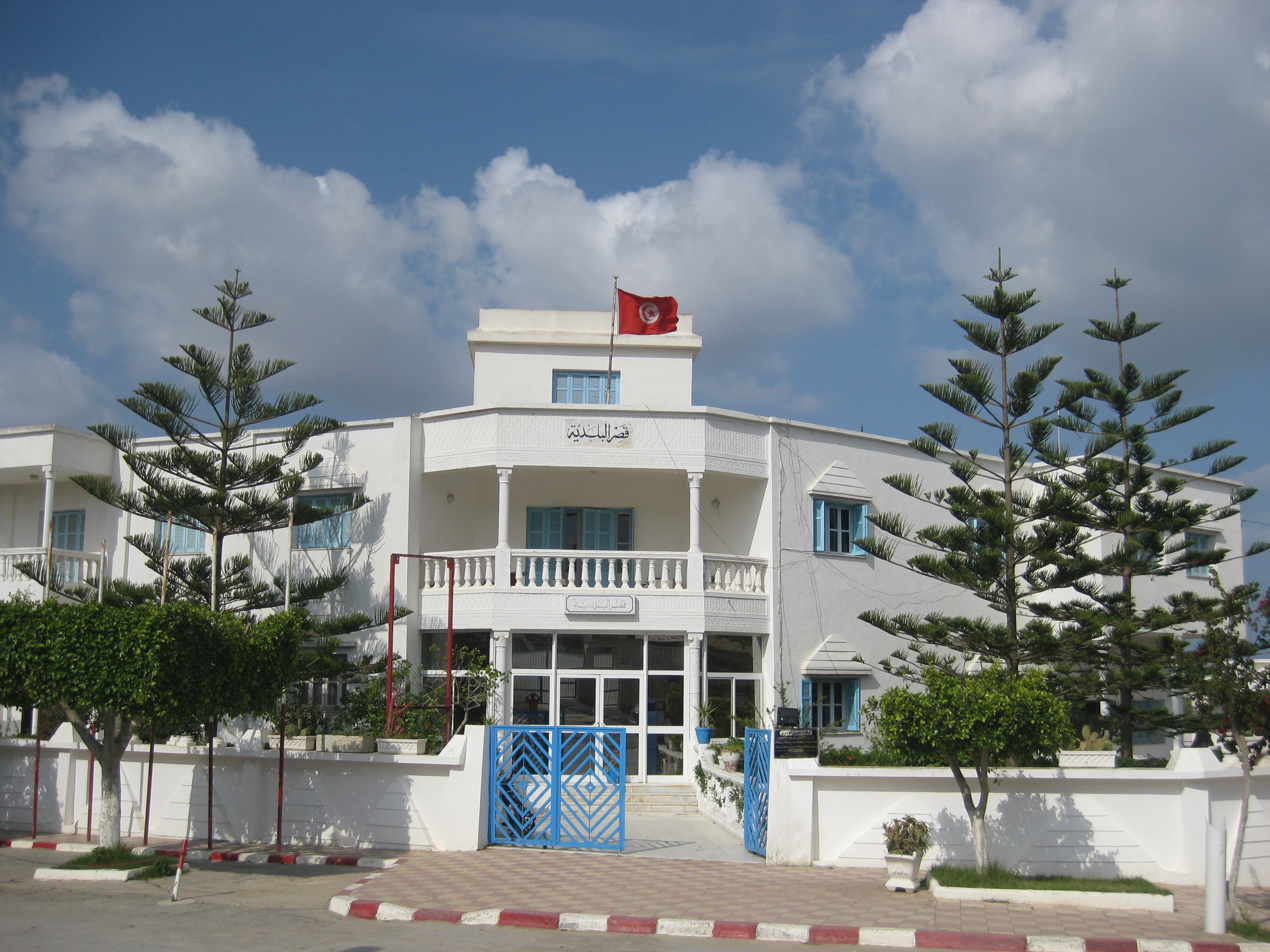
- Somâa town Hall.
- Interactive map of Somâa
- Country: Tunisia
- Governorate: Nabeul Governorate

Government
  - Mayor: Naoufel Ben Dhia (Ennahda)

Population (2014)
  - Total: 7,017
  - Density: 2.6/sq mi (1/km^{2})
- Time zone: UTC+1 (CET)
- Postal code: 8023

Somâa is a town and commune in the Nabeul Governorate, Tunisia. As of 2004 it had a population of 6,287.

== Description ==
Somâa (Arabic: الصمعة) is a Tunisian town located in the region of Cape Bon, about ten kilometers north of Nabeul.

Attached administratively to the governorate of Nabeul, it constitutes a municipality with 7,017 inhabitants in 20142. It was created by a decree of April 2, 1966.

== History ==
The city was built on a hilly site at the foot of the last foothills of the mountain range of the Tunisian ridge. It would be on the site of an ancient mausoleum dating back to the second century BC. J. - C., as Fernand Benoit thinks in 19314. Besides, the name of the city comes from the classical Arabic çawma'a designating the top of a hill or a high place inhabited by a hermit4.

Some ruins date from Carthaginian and Roman times, as shown by a coin discovered on the spot and dated from the reign of Trajan. In late antiquity a Christian bishopric was founded in the town, then called Praesidium.

Sidi Ali al-Çum'î, mystic of the 13th century, is the patron saint of the city. According to oral tradition, he is the ancestor of the majority of inhabitants.

During the Ottoman regency, Somâa produced some products such as mats, baskets, baskets and brooms sold throughout the country. Around 1860, the city has only 442 inhabitants.

The road connecting Somâa and Béni Khiar was enlarged in 1925 and two Franco-Arab schools built in 1927 and 1952.

On December 16, 1942, a Neo-Destour cell was founded in Somâa; militants were arrested by the French army on January 28, 1952, and deported to Zaraoura in the south of the country.

== Population ==
2014 Census (Municipal)
Homes	Families	Males	Females	Total
2341	1813	3561	3458	7019

== See also ==
- List of cities in Tunisia
