= James Aloysius Hickey =

American Christian leader (1920–2004)

His Eminence James Aloysius Hickey
- Cardinal; Archbishop of Washington
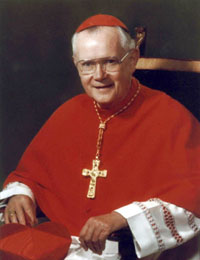
- Church: Roman Catholic Church
- See: Archdiocese of Washington
- Appointed: June 17, 1980
- Installed: August 5, 1980
- Term ended: November 21, 2000
- Predecessor: William Baum
- Successor: Theodore Edgar McCarrick
- Other post: Cardinal Priest of Santa Maria Madre del Redentore a Tor Bella Monaca
- Previous post: Bishop of Cleveland (1974–1980) Auxiliary Bishop of Saginaw (1967–1974)

Orders
- Ordination: June 15, 1946 by William Murphy
- Consecration: April 14, 1967 by John Francis Dearden
- Created cardinal: June 28, 1988 by John Paul II
- Rank: Cardinal-Priest

Personal details
- Born: October 11, 1920 Midland, Michigan, U.S.
- Died: October 24, 2004 (aged 84) Washington, D.C., U.S.
- Buried: Cathedral of St. Matthew the Apostle
- Motto: Veritatem in caritate (Teach the truth in charity)

Styles of James Hickey
- Reference style: His Eminence
- Spoken style: Your Eminence
- Informal style: Cardinal
- See: Washington

Ordination history of James Aloysius Hickey
History
Priestly ordination
- Ordained by: William Murphy
- Date: June 15, 1946
- Place: Cathedral of Mary of the Assumption, Saginaw, Michigan
Episcopal consecration
- Principal consecrator: John Francis Dearden
- Co-consecrators: Stephen Aloysius Leven, Stephen Stanislaus Woznicki
- Date: April 14, 1967
Episcopal succession
Bishops consecrated by James Aloysius Hickey as principal consecrator
- Michael Joseph Murphy: June 11, 1976
- Gilbert Ignatius Sheldon: June 11, 1976
- Anthony Michael Pilla: August 1, 1979
- James Anthony Griffin: August 1, 1979
- James Patterson Lyke: August 1, 1979
- Álvaro Corrada del Rio: August 4, 1985
- Leonard James Olivier: December 20, 1988
- William George Curlin: December 20, 1988
- Elliot Griffin Thomas: December 12, 1993
- William E. Lori: April 20, 1995

James Aloysius Hickey (October 11, 1920 – October 24, 2004) was an American Catholic prelate who served as Archbishop of Washington from 1980 to 2000, and was elevated to the cardinalate in 1988. Hickey previously served as Bishop of Cleveland from 1974 to 1980.

Hickey presided over a significant expansion of social services for the poor and sick in the Washington region by the Archdiocese of Washington. He was also a strong critic of American foreign policy in Nicaragua and El Salvador, and an advocate for nuclear disarmament.

== Biography ==
=== Early life ===
James Hickey was born on October 11, 1920, in Midland, Michigan, to James and Agnes (née Ryan) Hickey; he had an older sister, Marie. James Hickey was a dentist who, during the Great Depression, treated patients who could not pay for their dental care. At age 13, James Hickey entered St. Joseph Minor Seminary in Grand Rapids, Michigan. He graduated as valedictorian from Sacred Heart Major Seminary in Detroit in 1942. While in the seminary, Hickey helped provide pastoral care to migrant workers. He then attended The Catholic University of America in Washington, D.C.

=== Priesthood ===
Hickey was ordained to the priesthood for the Diocese of Saginaw by Bishop William Murphy on June 15, 1946. He then served as an associate pastor at St. Joseph's Parish in Saginaw, Michigan until 1947. Hickey went to Rome in 1947 to further his studies. He earned a Doctor of Canon Law degree from the Pontifical Lateran University in 1950, and a Doctor of Theology degree from the Pontifical University of St. Thomas Aquinas (Angelicum) in 1951.

After returning to Michigan, he served as secretary to Bishop Stephen Woznicki from 1951 to 1966. He was also the founding rector of St. Paul Seminary. From 1962 to 1965, Hickey attended the Second Vatican Council in Rome as a peritus for Bishop Woznicki. The Vatican raised Hickey to the rank of domestic prelate on October 31, 1963.

=== Auxiliary Bishop of Saginaw ===
On February 18, 1967, Hickey was appointed as auxiliary bishop of the Diocese of Saginaw and titular bishop of Taraqua by Pope Paul VI. He received his episcopal consecration on April 14, 1967, from Archbishop John Dearden, with Bishops Woznicki and Stephen Leven serving as co-consecrators, at the Cathedral of St. Mary. Hickey selected as his episcopal motto: Veritatem In Caritate, meaning, "Truth in Charity" (Ephesians 4:15).

Hickey served as chair of priestly formation within the United States Conference of Catholic Bishops (USCCB) from 1968 to 1969. In March 1969, he became rector of the Pontifical North American College in Rome, where he would oversee the formation of American seminarians for the next five years.

=== Bishop of Cleveland ===
Hickey was named the eighth bishop of Cleveland on May 31, 1974, by Paul VI. Replacing Bishop Clarence Issenmann, he was installed on July 16, 1974. During his tenure in Cleveland, Hickey was an advocate of racial unity and became active in justice issues involving El Salvador. In 1980, he traveled to El Salvador to attend the funeral of Archbishop Óscar Romero, who had been murdered by right-wing assassins. Sister Dorothy Kazel and Jean Donovan, two women whom Hickey had commissioned to serve as missionaries in El Salvador, were later murdered there; he kept their photographs on the wall of his private chapel for the rest of his life.

=== Archbishop of Washington ===
Pope John Paul II appointed Hickey as archbishop of Washington on June 17, 1980. Hickey was one of the first American bishops to address the issue of sexual abuse by clergy, which would become a nationwide scandal in 2002.

In 1983, Hickey was dispatched by John Paul II on an apostolic visitation to investigate liturgical abuses in the Archdiocese of Seattle, then led by Archbishop Raymond Hunthausen. Commenting on the visitation, Hickey said, "It wasn't easy, you know."

In August 1986, Cardinal Joseph Ratzinger, the prefect of the Sacred Congregation for the Doctrine of the Faith, in Rome, sent a letter to Reverend Charles Curran, a theologian at Catholic University. The letter revoked his authorization to teach theology at Catholic University or any other such institution. Curran had challenged Catholic policies on divorce, birth control, homosexual acts and abortion. As chancellor of Catholic University, Hickey supported Ratzinger's action.

He was Grand Prior of the Middle Atlantic USA Lieutenancy of the Order of the Holy Sepulchre from 1993 to 2005.

=== Cardinal ===
John Paul II created Hickey as cardinal priest of the Church of Santa Maria Madre del Redentore a Tor Bella Monaca in Rome during the consistory of June 28, 1988. At that point, Hickey was one of thirteen Americans in the College of Cardinals. That same year, Hickey was invited to lead a retreat for the pope and his household.

In 1989, Hickey excommunicated the African-American priest George Stallings, a one-time protégé, after Stallings formed the unauthorized Imani Temple African-American Catholic Congregation in Washington.

Within the USCCB, Hickey served as chairman of the Committee on Doctrine (1979 to 1981), of the Committee on Human Values (1984 to 1987), and of the Committee on the Pontifical North American College (1989 to 1991 and 1994 to 1997).

Hickey's tenure in Washington D.C. oversaw a significant expansion of Catholic Charities, which became the region's largest private social service agency. He also established:

- The Catholic Charities Health Care Network
- The Archdiocesan Legal Network, which provides pro bono care for the region's low income residents
- Birthing and Care, which provides pre-natal, delivery and post-natal medical care to women in financial need
- Faith in the City, an initiative to revitalize inner-city Catholic schools
- Victory Housing in 1979, which develops assisted and independent living for senior citizens

In conjunction with Mother Teresa, Hickey also founded a Washington convent of the Missionaries of Charity for the care of the homeless and terminally ill. He once declared,

"We serve the homeless not because they are Catholic, but because we are Catholic. If we don't care for the sick, educate the young, care for the homeless, then we cannot call ourselves the church of Jesus Christ."

Hickey resigned as archbishop of Washington on November 21, 2000, after twenty years of service.

== Views ==
In addition to his social activism, Hickey was known for his orthodox views regarding Catholic doctrine.

=== Capital punishment ===
In early 2000, Hickey appealed to Maryland Governor Parris Glendening to commute the death sentence of Eugene Colvin-El. Colvin-El had been convicted in 1980 of murdering 80-year-old Lena Sunshine Buchman in Pikesville, Maryland, in a trial that raised concerns among legal observers. His sentence was commuted by Glendening to life imprisonment in June 2000.

=== Contraception and abortion ===
Hickey halted archdiocesan funding for a crisis pregnancy center in College Park, Maryland, after it declined to stop dispensing contraceptives.

=== Foreign policy ===
During the 1980s, Hickey lobbied members of the United States Congress to stop sending aid to the Contra insurgents in Nicaragua. He also pushed his fellow American bishops to take strong stands against increased military spending and in favor of nuclear disarmament.

During the Salvadoran Civil War, Hickey opposed the Reagan administration's support for the military government of El Salvador. In 1981, Hickey told the US House Subcommittee on Inter-American Affairs: "Our position is to oppose military aid and intervention from all outside powers." He feared a Communist takeover in El Salvador but opposed sending military assistance, believing such weapons would strengthen repressive elements in security forces.

=== HIV/AIDS ===
In February 1987, Hickey visited Reverend Michael Peterson, a psychiatrist in the archdiocese, in the hospital. During their meeting, Peterson revealed to Hickey that he was dying of HIV/AIDS, which at that time had no treatments. The two clerics decided to send letters to all the bishops in the United States, asking them to extend mercy to HIV/AIDS patients. Hickey wrote:

"Father Peterson's illness reminds us in a personal way of the terrible human tragedy of AIDS in our midst. His suffering challenges us to reach out with renewed conviction and compassion to those with AIDS and their families and friends."

Peterson died in April 1987.

=== Labor ===
While Archbishop of Washington, Hickey ordered all large scale building projects in the archdiocese to be union jobs.

=== LBGTQ ministries ===
Hickey ordered New Ways Ministry, an unauthorized ministry for LGBTQ Catholics, to stop any operations on archdiocesan property in the early 1980s. He also forced Georgetown University to stop DignityUSA, a national LGBTQ ministry organization, from celebrating mass on campus in 1987.

=== Liturgical abuses ===
Hickey complained about liturgical abuses at Holy Trinity Church in Georgetown, even sending then auxiliary bishop William E. Lori to investigate the Jesuit-run parish.

== Death ==
Hickey died at the Jeanne Jugan Home of the Little Sisters of the Poor in Washington, D.C., at age 84. Following a funeral Mass at the National Shrine of the Immaculate Conception, he was buried in St. Francis Chapel at St. Matthew's Cathedral. When asked by The Washington Post in 1989 what he would like people to say about him after his death, Hickey replied,

"First, I'd like them to say that he was always loyal to his Church. Second, that he was a friend to Catholic education. And third, if they don't want to say the first two, at least I hope they would chisel on the stone, 'He served the poor.'"

== Sex abuse cover-up ==
According to a 2020 Vatican report, Hickey failed to act on credible accusations of sexual abuse against then-Cardinal Theodore McCarrick and continued to offer his support and endorsement to McCarrick. :

"He (McCarrick) welcomed prominent prelates to the new Diocese, including Archbishop Laghi,124 Archbishop James A. Hickey,125 Sebastiano Cardinal Baggio,126 and Joseph Cardinal Bernardin ...While the Nunciature has been aware of these accusations, the Nuncio has affirmed that they have been investigated and not substantiated, and is basically convinced that they are not really credible. Nevertheless, this Dicastery would note that, in his letter of April 4, 1994, while Cardinal James Hickey mentions that [McCarrick] should be presumed innocent, he wrote: “All this does not completely eliminate the possibility of some wrongdoing; my counsel is to proceed very slowly and cautiously”

Catholic Church titles
Preceded by Clarence George Issenmann	Bishop of Cleveland; 1974–1980	Succeeded by Anthony Michael Pilla
Preceded by William Wakefield Baum	Archbishop of Washington; 1980–2000	Succeeded by Theodore Edgar McCarrick
