= Diocese of Cleveland =

Latin Catholic jurisdiction in the US

Coordinates: 41°28′56″N 81°40′11″W

Diocese of Cleveland Dioecesis Clevelandensis
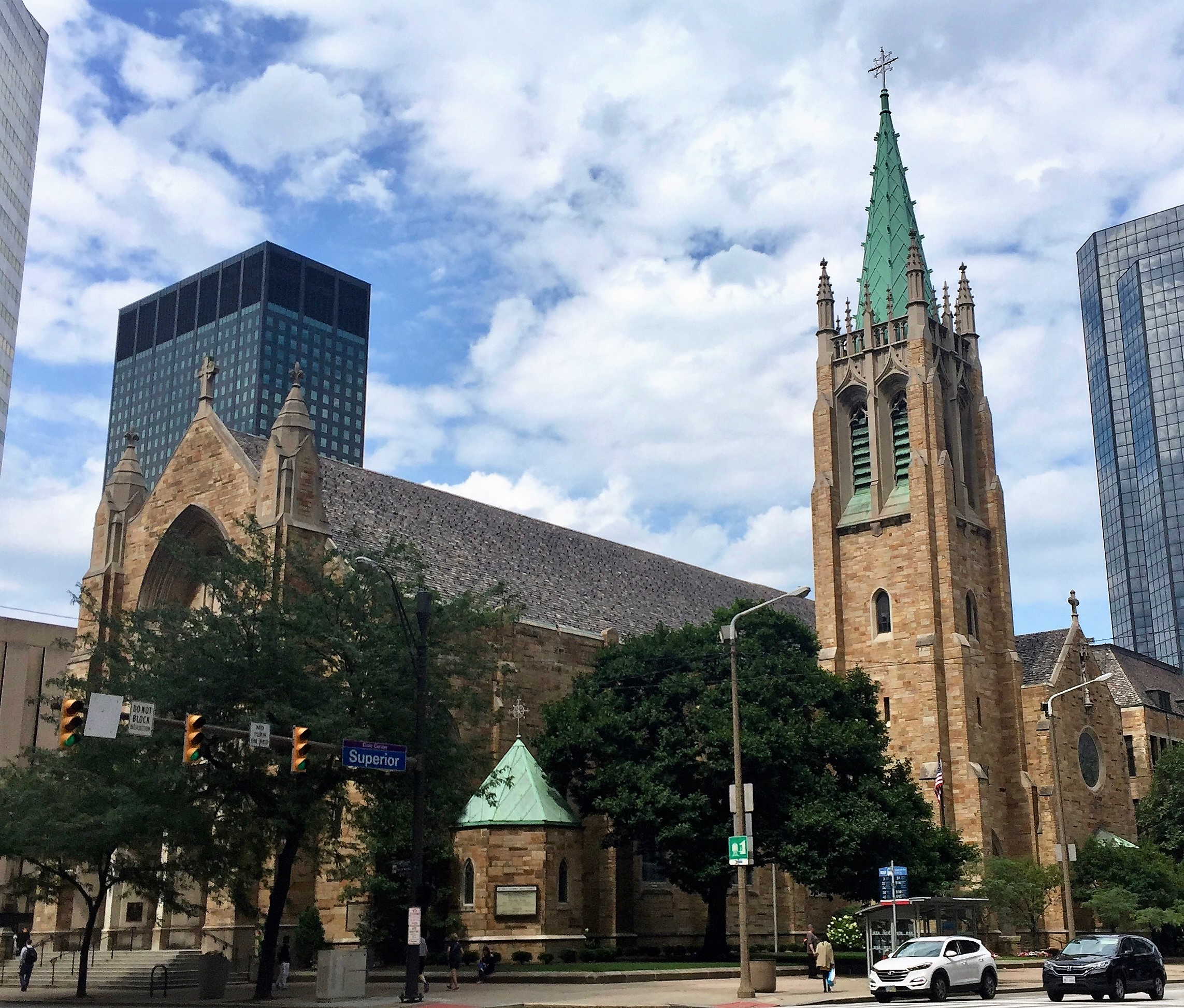
- Cathedral of St. John the Evangelist

- Coat of arms

Location
- Country: United States
- Territory: The counties of Ashland, Cuyahoga, Geauga, Lake, Lorain, Medina, Summit and Wayne in northeastern Ohio.
- Ecclesiastical province: Cincinnati

Statistics
- Area: 3,414 sq mi (8,840 km^{2})
- Population: Total; Catholics: (as of 2019); 2,774,113; 682,948 (24%)
- Parishes: 185

Information
- Denomination: Catholic
- Sui iuris church: Latin Church
- Rite: Roman Rite
- Established: April 23, 1847 (179 years ago)
- Cathedral: Cathedral of St. John the Evangelist
- Patron saint: St. John the Evangelist

Current leadership
- Pope: Leo XIV
- Bishop: Edward Charles Malesic
- Metropolitan Archbishop: Robert Gerald Casey
- Auxiliary Bishops: Michael G. Woost
- Bishops emeritus: Roger William Gries (O.S.B.)

Map
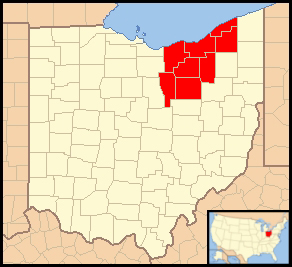

Website
- dioceseofcleveland.org

The Diocese of Cleveland (Latin: Dioecesis Clevelandensis) is a diocese of the Catholic Church in northeastern Ohio in the United States. It is a suffragan diocese of the Archdiocese of Cincinnati. The bishop is Edward Malesic. The Cathedral of St. John the Evangelist, located in Cleveland, is the mother church.

== Territory ==
The Diocese of Cleveland encompasses the counties of Ashland, Cuyahoga, Geauga, Lake, Lorain, Medina, Summit, and Wayne.

== History ==
=== Early history ===
During the 18th century, present day Ohio was part of the French colony of New France. The Diocese of Quebec in Quebec City had jurisdiction over the region. However, unlike other parts of the future American Midwest, the French made no attempts to found Catholic missions in Ohio.

In 1763, after the end of the French and Indian War, France ceded all of its colonies west of the Mississippi River to Great Britain. Ohio Country became part of the British Province of Quebec, forbidden from settlement by American colonists.After the American Revolution ended in 1783, Pope Pius VI erected in 1784 the Prefecture Apostolic of the United States, encompassing the entire territory of the new nation. In 1787, the Ohio area became part of the Northwest Territory of the United States. Pius VI created the Diocese of Baltimore, the first diocese in the United States, to replace the prefecture apostolic in 1789.

In 1808, Pope Pius VII erected the Diocese of Bardstown in Kentucky, with jurisdiction over the new state of Ohio along with the other midwest states. Pope Pius VII on June 19, 1821, erected the Diocese of Cincinnati, taking all of Ohio from Bardstown.

=== 1840 to 1870 ===
Pope Pius IX erected the Diocese of Cleveland on April 23, 1847, with territory taken from the Archdiocese of Cincinnati. At that point, the diocese included counties going west to Toledo and south to Youngstown. He named Louis Rappe as the first bishop of Cleveland.

When Rappe took office, the diocese contained 42 churches and 21 priests; the first and only Catholic church in Cleveland was St. Mary's on the Flats. He soon established the city's first parochial school, which doubled as a chapel.

Rappe purchased an episcopal residence in 1848. He converted a frame house on the property into St. Mary's Seminary. Rappe also laid the cornerstone of St. John's Cathedral in 1848. In 1849, Rappe went to Europe to recruit clergy for the diocese. He returned in 1850 with four priests, five seminarians, two Sisters of Charity and six Ursuline nuns. The Daughters of the Immaculate Heart of Mary opened St. Mary's Orphan Asylum for Females in 1851. Rappe in 1852 organized the Sisters of Charity of St. Augustine, a new religious institute in Cleveland. That same year, the sisters opened St. Joseph's Hospital, the first general hospital in Cleveland

Rappe consecrated St. John's Cathedral on November 7, 1852. The Sisters of Charity of Saint Augustine opened St. Vincent's Asylum for Boys in 1852. Rappe also introduced a contingent of Grey Nuns from Montreal, Quebec, to the diocese in 1856.

In 1865, Rappe established St. Vincent Charity Hospital in Cleveland for wounded veterans of the just-ended American Civil War. It was operated by the Sisters of Charity of St. Augustine.In 1869, the Sisters of the Good Shepard opened a convent in Cleveland for young woment.That same year, Rappe invited a contigent of Franciscans to Cleveland from the Kingdom of Saxony to operated St. Bernard's Parish, a German parish in Cleveland. The Little Sisters of the Poor moved into the diocese in 1870, opening a home for the elderly in Cleveland.Rappe retired in 1870 after 33 years as bishop of Cleveland. The Ursuline Sisters of Cleveland in 1871 opened Ursuline College.

=== 1870 to 1900 ===
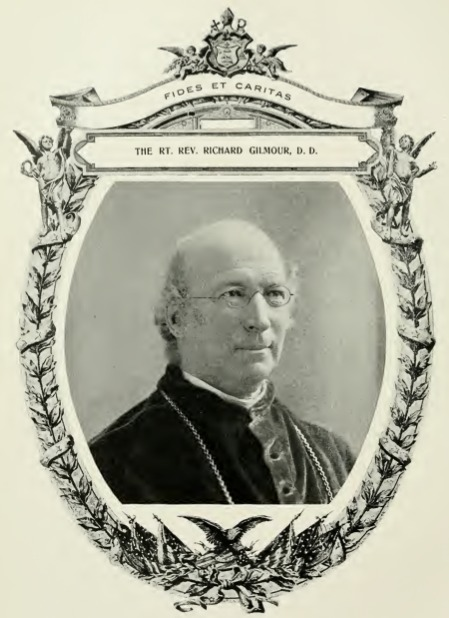
Bishop Gilmour (pre-1891)

In 1872, Pope Pius IX appointed Richard Gilmour as the second bishop of Cleveland. In 1873, the Sisters of Charity of Saint Augustine opened St. Ann's Hospital in Cleveland for maternity patients and newborn babies.

As bishop, Gilmour founded the Catholic Universe, the diocesan newspaper, in 1874. In 1877, the Cuyahoga County auditor announced plans to tax Catholic churches and schools. Gilmour fought the auditor in court, winning his case six years later.The Sisters of Notre Dame in 1878 opened Notre Dame Academy for girls in Cleveland. It is today Notre Dame-Cathedral Latin High School.

In 1882, Gilmour condemned the Ladies Land League chapter in Cleveland. Founded in Ireland, the League was a women's organization that assisted tenants facing eviction. In 1886, he brought in a group of Jesuits from Buffalo, New York, to open St. Ignatius High School and College. The Order of St. Francis of Perpetual Adoration founded St. Michael's Hospital in Cleveland in 1884.Gilmour in 1890 purchased land on the west side of Cleveland to establish St. John Hospital, to be operated by the Sisters of St. Francis.

After Gilmour died in 1891, Pope Leo XIII named Ignatius Horstmann of the Archdiocese of Philadelphia as the new bishop of Cleveland.In the early 1890s, Horstmann faced a schism within the diocese. Polish parishioners at St. Stanislaus Parish in Cleveland, led by the priest Anton Kolaszewski, were demanding more control over their parish and more sensitivity to their customs. Despite Horstmann's refusal, Kolaszewski continued to press for independence and accused the bishop of sexual abuse crimes.

In 1892, Horstmann relieved Kolaszewski of his post. When the new pastor arrived at St. Stanislaus Church for his first mass, a brawl broke out among the parishioners. In 1894, a group of parishioners started a new independent parish, Immaculate Heart of Mary, with Kolaszewski as pastor; Horstmann excommunicated all of them. Years later, after the deaths of both men, the diocese accepted the new church.Ellen Donavan, a lay woman in Cleveland, opened the Home of the Holy Family in that city to aid orphans and poor children.

=== 1900 to 1920 ===
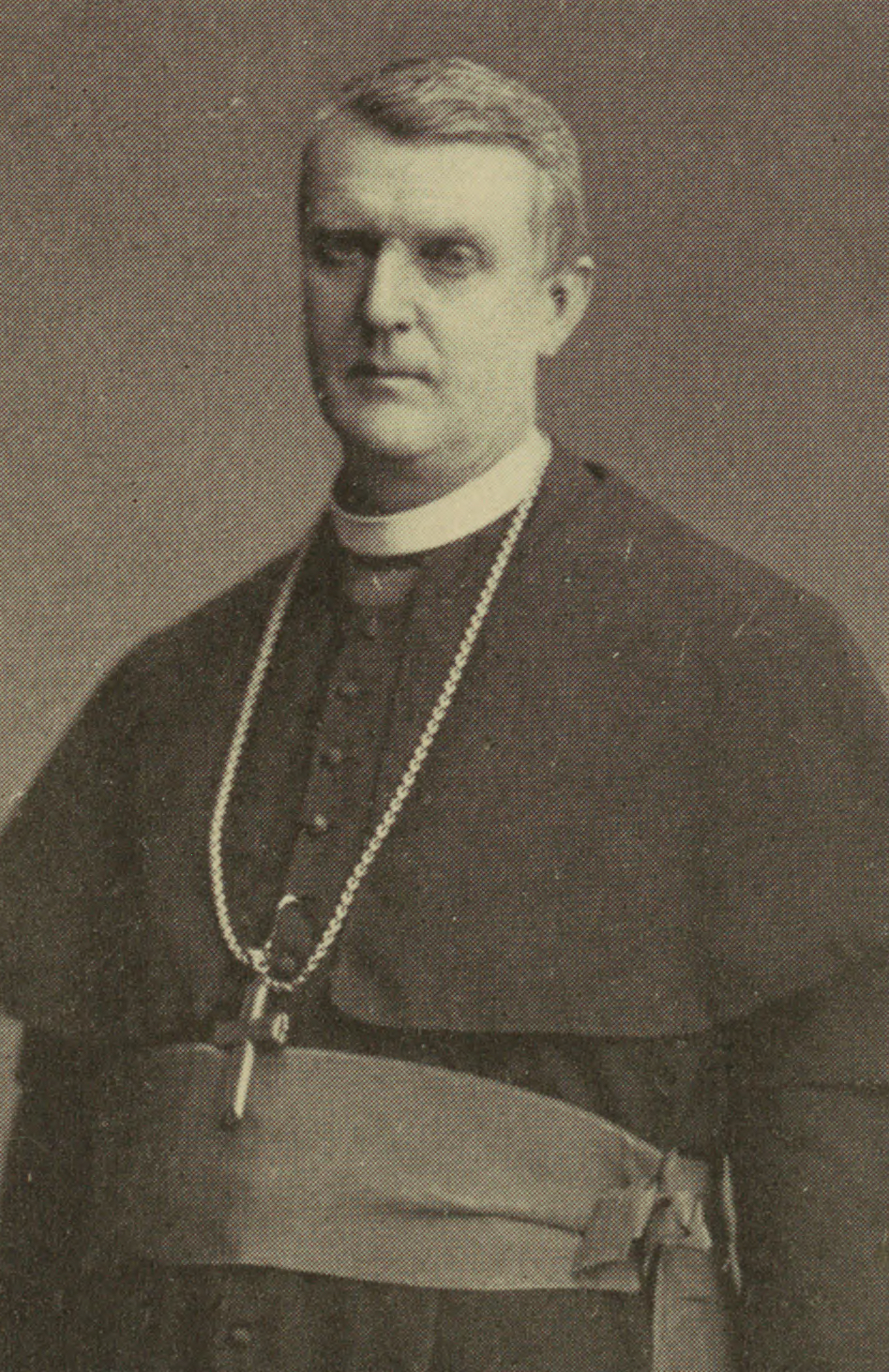
Bishop Horstmann (1903)

In 1906, the diocese opened the St. Anthony Home for Working Boys in Cleveland.This was followed in 1907 by the establishment of The Catherine Horstmann Home, a residence for homeless women in Cleveland.

In 1907, Horstmann faced a second schism, this time with Slovenian Catholics. After removing Kasimir Zakrajsek as pastor of St. Vitus Parish in Cleveland, he faced violent protests. After the parish rectory was stoned, the replacement priest was forced to flee. Over 100 people were arrested. On September 22, 1907, 5,000 Polish protesters marched on Horstmann's residence, demanding Zakrajsek's reinstatement and home rule for St. Vitus. Horstmann died in 1908.

Pope Pius IX named John Farrelly of the Diocese of Nashville as bishop of Cleveland in 1909. The next year, Pius IX erected the Diocese of Toledo, removing the Toledo area counties from the Diocese of Cleveland. During his 12-year-long tenure as bishop, Farrelly improved the parochial school system; organized Catholic Charities; and erected 47 churches and schools. Cathedral Latin High School was founded in Chardon in 1916, staffed by teaching brothers of the Society of Mary. Today it is Notre Dame-Cathedral Latin High School

After the American entry into World War I in 1917, Farrelly was appointed by Cleveland Mayor Harry L. Davis to the Cleveland War Commission. Farrelly also ordered English to be spoken at all German-language churches and schools in the diocese.

=== 1920 to 1945 ===
Farrelly died in 1921. Bishop Joseph Schrembs of the Diocese of Toledo was appointed bishop of Cleveland in 1921 by Pope Pius XI. In 1925, the pope presented the relics of St. Christine to Schrembs. Christina of Bolsena was a 13-year-old girl who was martyred for her Catholic faith around 300 AD. Her relics were moved from the Catacombs of Rome to St. John's Cathedral in Cleveland. The diocese had previously donated money to the Vatican for the establishment of the House of Catacombs outside Rome. The diocese in 1928 opened Sisters College in Cleveland to train nurses. By 1935, it had become St. John's College, a four-year accredited institution.That same year, St. Ignatius College completed its move from Cleveland to a new campus in University Heights. It now became John Carroll University.

During his tenure, Schrembs erected 27 parishes in Cleveland and 35 outside the city. In 1942, as Schrembs' diabetes worsened, Pope Pius XII named Bishop Edward Hoban from the Diocese of Rockford as Schrembs' coadjutor bishop to help him with his duties. In 1943, Pius XII erected the Diocese of Youngstown, taking counties from the Youngstown area away from the Diocese of Cleveland.

=== 1945 to 2000 ===
After Schrembs died in 1945, Hoban automatically succeeded him as bishop of Cleveland. As bishop, Hoban encouraged European refugees displaced by World War II to settle in Cleveland. He also established national and ethnic parishes, but insisted that their parochial schools only teach in English. He helped rebuild and remodel St. John's Cathedral, and enlarged St. John's College. Hoban centralized Parmadale Family Services and constructed additional nursing homes. Hoban opened Holy Family Cancer Home, a hospice in Parma. Hoban in 1953 opened the St. Charles Borromeo Seminary, a minor seminary, in Cleveland. He also expanded the Newman Apostolate for Catholic students attending public universities and colleges.

During Hoban's 21-year-long tenure, the number of Catholics in the diocese increased from 546,000 to 870,000. Hoban also established 61 parishes, 47 elementary schools, and a dozen high schools. Pope Paul VI appointed Bishop Clarence Issenmann of the Diocese of Columbus as coadjutor bishop of Cleveland on October 7, 1964. When Hoban died in 1966, Issenmann automatically became his replacement in Cleveland.

In November 1968, Issenmann asked all adults attending mass in the diocese to sign petitions of support for Humanae vitae, Pope Paul VI's 1969 encyclical against artificial birth control. Issenmann was the only bishop in the country to make that request of parishioners. issenmann retired as bishop of Cleveland in 1974 due to poor health. Pope Paul VI in 1974 named Auxiliary Bishop James Hickey of the Diocese of Saginaw as the new bishop of Cleveland. Six years later, in 1980, the pope named him as archbishop of the Archdiocese of Washington.John Paul II appointed Auxiliary Bishop Anthony Pilla to replace Hickey as bishop of Cleveland in 1980.

=== 2000 to 2010 ===
In 2005, 36 lay members of the diocese sued Pilla, accusing him of allowing $2 million in diocesan funds to be stolen. The judge dismissed the lawsuit, saying that the plaintiffs did not have the legal standing to sue in this case.In 2004, Pilla received an anonymous letter accusing Joseph Smith, the assistant treasurer for the diocese, of theft. After meeting with Pilla, the bishop put Smith administrative leave; Smith later resigned his position. In 2005, 36 parishioners sued the diocese, claiming that Smith and two other diocesan officials had diverted $2 million of diocese funds to their own businesses.After 26 years as bishop, Pilla resigned as bishop of Cleveland in 2006.On April 5, 2006, Pope Benedict XVI named Auxiliary Bishop Richard Lennon of the Archdiocese of Boston as the tenth bishop of Cleveland.

In August 2007, Smith and Anton Zgoznik, a consultant hired by the diocese, were charged with 17 counts of money laundering and tax evasion. Smith steered contracts worth $17.5 to Zgonik, who gave Smith kickbacks of $784,000. Zgoznik was convicted in October 2007 of conspiracy to commit mail fraud and mail fraud. In December 2008, Smith was acquitted of embezzlement, but convicted of tax evasion; he received one year in federal prison.

In 2009, the diocese announced the closing or merging of 52 parishes, due to the shortage of priests, the migration of Catholics to the suburbs, and the financial difficulties of some parishes. The diocese also closed or merged several number of parish schools. The hardest hit were urban parishes in Cleveland, Akron, Lorain, and Elyria. Parishioners from 13 urban parishes appealed Lennon's action to the Congregation for the Clergy in Rome.

=== 2010 to present ===
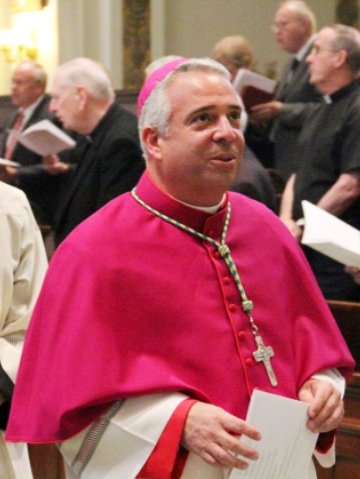
Bishop Perez (2021)

In July 2011, an Ohio man sued Pilla and the diocese, saying that their negligence allowed a priest to sexually abuse him when he was a minor. The plaintiff said that Patrick O'Connor, a diocesan priest at St. Jude Parish in Elyria, abused him from 1997 to 1999. Pilla knew that O'Connor had abused a child during the 1980s at St. Joseph Parish in Cuyahoga Falls. The diocese settled with that victim in 2003 and sent O'Connor to another parish Elyria. He resigned from the priesthood in 2008. O'Connor pleaded guilty to corruption of a minor in 2009 and was sentenced to 90 days in prison.

In 2012, the Congregation for the Clergy overturned all 13 urban parish closings in Cleveland because Lennon did not follow proper procedure or canon law. Lennon resigned as bishop of Cleveland in 2016 due to poor health.

Pope Francis in 2017 appointed Auxiliary Bishop Nelson J. Perez of the Diocese of Rockville Centre to replace Lennon. Three years later, the pope name Perez as archbishop of the Archdiocese of Philadelphia. In July 2019, the diocese added 22 more names to its list of "credibly accused" clergy. In March 2002, Bishop Pilla published a list of 28 priests accused of sexual abuse of minors. Fifteen of them were active priests, whom Pilla suspended from ministry. In December 2019, Robert McWilliams was arrested at St. Joseph Parish in Strongsville on four counts of possessing child pornography. Bishop Perez had called for McWilliams's arrest, describing the case as a "painful situation." McWilliams pleaded guilty in July 2021 to sex trafficking of youths, sexual exploitation of children and possession of child pornography. Sentenced to life in prison in November 2021, McWilliams committed suicide in February 2022.

Francis in 2023 appointed Bishop Edward C. Malesic of the Diocese of Greensburg as bishop of Cleveland. Malesic in 2023 issued a set of policies regarding the treatment of transgender students in the diocesan schools. These included the banning of the use of preferred pronouns and the notification of parents if a student starts changing their appearance to that of the opposite sex. Malesic emphasized that transgender students were welcomed in the schools. Former priest Luis J. Barajas was indicted in November 2023 on six counts of gross sexual imposition. He was arrested in October 2023 and released in January 2024 after posting bond. He had also been arrested in 2019 on charges of misconduct with a minor.

In May 2025, a group of religious sisters launched the Women Religious Archives Collaborative, an initiative in Cleveland to preserve and store the histories of women's religious groups in the United States.

== Statistics ==
As of 2023, the Diocese of Cleveland had a population of approximately 613,000 Catholics and contained 185 parishes, three Catholic hospitals, three universities, two shrines (St. Paul Shrine Church and St. Stanislaus Church), and two seminaries (Centers for Pastoral Leadership).

== Bishops ==
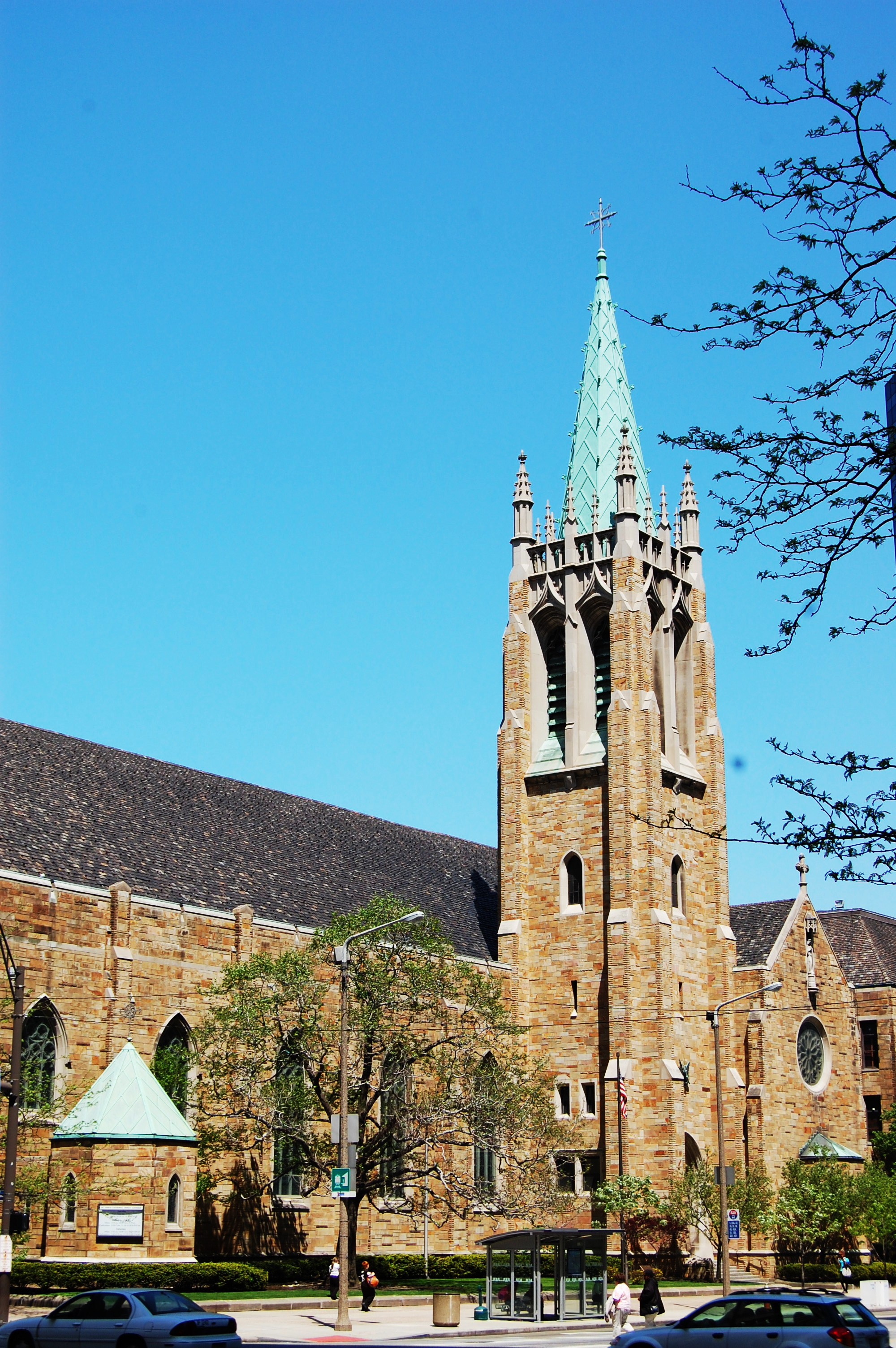
Cathedral of Saint John the Evangelist, Cleveland, Ohio (2010)

=== Bishops of Cleveland ===
1. Louis Amadeus Rappe (1847–1870)
2. Richard Gilmour (1872–1891)
3. Ignatius Frederick Horstmann (1891–1908)
4. John Patrick Farrelly (1909–1921)
5. Joseph Schrembs (1921–1945), appointed Archbishop ad personam by Pope Pius XII in 1939
6. Edward Francis Hoban (1945–1966; coadjutor bishop 1942–1945), appointed Archbishop ad personam by Pope Pius XII in 1951
7. Clarence George Issenmann (1966–1974; coadjutor bishop 1964–1966)
8. James Aloysius Hickey (1974–1980), appointed Archbishop of Washington (Cardinal in 1988)
9. Anthony Michael Pilla (1980–2006)
10. Richard Gerard Lennon (2006–2016)
11. Nelson Jesus Perez (2017–2020), appointed Archbishop of Philadelphia
12. Edward Charles Malesic (2020–present)

=== Auxiliary Bishops of Cleveland ===
1. Joseph Maria Koudelka (1907–1911), appointed Auxiliary Bishop of Milwaukee and later Bishop of Superior
2. James A. McFadden (1922–1943), appointed Bishop of Youngstown
3. William Michael Cosgrove (1943–1968), appointed Bishop of Belleville
4. John Raphael Hagan (1946)
5. Floyd Lawrence Begin (1947–1962), appointed Bishop of Oakland
6. John Joseph Krol (1953–1961), appointed Archbishop of Philadelphia (Cardinal in 1967)
7. Clarence Edward Elwell (1962–1968), appointed Bishop of Columbus
8. John Francis Whealon (1961–1966), appointed Bishop of Erie and later Archbishop of Hartford
9. Gilbert Ignatius Sheldon (1976–1992), appointed Bishop of Steubenville
10. Michael Joseph Murphy (1976–1978), appointed Bishop of Erie
11. James Anthony Griffin (1979–1983), appointed Bishop of Columbus
12. James Patterson Lyke O.F.M. (1979–1990), appointed Archbishop of Atlanta
13. Anthony Michael Pilla (1979–1980), appointed Bishop of Cleveland
14. Anthony Edward Pevec (1982–2001)
15. Alexander James Quinn (1983–2008)
16. Martin John Amos (2001–2006), appointed Bishop of Davenport
17. Roger William Gries, O.S.B. (2001–2013)
18. Michael Gerard Woost, (2022–present)

=== Other affiliated bishops ===
- John Patrick Carroll, Bishop of Helena (1889–1904)
- Augustus John Schwertner, Bishop of Wichita in 1921 (1897–1910)
- Thomas Charles O'Reilly, Bishop of Scranton (1898–1927)
- Edward Mooney, titular Archbishop and Apostolic Delegate, and later Archbishop (ad personam) of Rochester and Archbishop of Detroit (Cardinal in 1946) (1909–1926)
- Charles Hubert Le Blond, Bishop of Saint Joseph (1909–1933)
- Michael Joseph Ready, Bishop of Columbus (1918–1944)
- John Patrick Treacy, Coadjutor Bishop and later Bishop of La Crosse (1918–1945)
- Joseph Patrick Hurley, Bishop of Saint Augustine (and Archbishop (ad personam) in 1949) (1919–1940)
- John Francis Dearden, Coadjutor Bishop and later Bishop of Pittsburgh and Archbishop of Detroit (Cardinal in 1969) (1932–1948)
- Paul John Hallinan, Bishop of Charleston and later Archbishop of Atlanta (1937–1958)
- Raymond Joseph Gallagher, Bishop of Lafayette in Indiana (1939–1965)
- Timothy P. Broglio, Apostolic Nuncio to the Dominican Republic and later Archbishop for the Military Services, USA (1977–2001)
- David John Walkowiak, Bishop of Grand Rapids (1979–2013)
- Neal James Buckon, Auxiliary Bishop for the Military Services, USA (1995–2011)

== Education ==
As of 2025, the Diocese of Cleveland had 20 high schools and 88 elementary schools with a total enrollment exceeding 39,000 students.

In 2023, the diocese stated that students and employees at diocesan schools could not show expressions of LGBTQ identity. Several independent Catholic schools chose not to follow the policy.

=== High schools ===
High school	Location	Founded	Gender	Administered by
Archbishop Hoban High School	Akron	1953	Co-ed	Congregation of Holy Cross
Beaumont School	Cleveland Heights	1850	Girls	Order of Saint Ursula
Benedictine High School	Cleveland	1927	Boys	Benedictine Order
Cleveland Central Catholic High School	Cleveland	1968	Co-ed	Diocese of Cleveland
Elyria Catholic High School	Elyria	1949	Co-ed	Diocese of Cleveland
Gilmour Academy	Gates Mills	1946	Co-ed	Congregation of the Holy Cross
Holy Name High School	Parma Heights	1914	Co-ed	Diocese of Cleveland
Lake Catholic High School	Mentor	1917	Co-ed	Diocese of Cleveland
Magnificat High School	Rocky River	1955	Girls	Sisters of the Humility of Mary
Notre Dame-Cathedral Latin School	Chardon	1988	Co-ed	Sisters of Notre Dame
Our Lady of the Elms School	Akron	1923	Girls	Sisters of St. Dominic
Padua Franciscan High School	Parma	1961	Co-ed	Franciscans
Saint Edward High School	Lakewood	1949	Boys	Congregation of Holy Cross
Saint Ignatius High School	Cleveland	1886	Boys	Society of Jesus
Saint Joseph Academy	Cleveland	1890	Girls	Congregation of the Sisters of St. Joseph
Saint Martin de Porres High School	Cleveland	2004	Co-ed	Society of Jesus, Sisters of the Humility of Mary, Cristo Rey
Saint Vincent-Saint Mary High School	Akron	1972	Co-ed	Society of Mary
Trinity High School	Garfield Heights	1973	Co-ed	Sisters of Saint Joseph of the Third Order of Saint Francis
Villa Angela-Saint Joseph High School	Cleveland	1990	Co-ed	Diocese of Cleveland
Walsh Jesuit High School	Cuyahoga Falls	1964	Co-ed	Society of Jesus

=== Closed high schools ===
- Cathedral Latin High School - Cleveland (all-boys) Closed in 1979.
- Lorain Catholic High School – Lorain (co-ed) Closed in 2004.
- Nazareth Academy – Parma Heights (girls), (Congregation of the Sisters of St. Joseph 1957–1980). Closed in 1978, Holy Name High School moved into its building.
- Regina High School – South Euclid (girls), (Sisters of Notre Dame), Closed in 2010.
- St. Augustine Academy – Lakewood (girls) Closed in 2005. Now Lakewood Catholic Academy elementary school.
- St. Peter Chanel High School – Bedford (co-ed) (Marist Fathers 1957–1973; Diocese of Cleveland 1973–2013). Closed in 2013.
