= Anthony Pilla =

American Roman Catholic prelate (1932–2021)

The Most Reverend Anthony Michael Pilla
- Bishop of Cleveland
- Church: Roman Catholic Church
- See: Diocese of Cleveland
- Appointed: November 13, 1980
- Installed: January 6, 1981
- Term ended: April 4, 2006
- Predecessor: James Aloysius Hickey
- Successor: Richard Gerard Lennon
- Previous posts: Auxiliary Bishop of Cleveland; 1979 - 1980

Orders
- Ordination: May 23, 1959
- Consecration: August 1, 1979 by James Aloysius Hickey, Clarence George Issenmann, and Joseph Abel Francis

Personal details
- Born: November 12, 1932 Cleveland, Ohio, USA
- Died: September 21, 2021 (aged 88) Cleveland
- Motto: Live on in my love
- Coat of arms

Ordination history of Anthony Pilla
History
Episcopal consecration
- Consecrated by: James Aloysius Hickey (Cleveland)
- Date: August 1, 1979
Episcopal succession
Bishops consecrated by Anthony Pilla as principal consecrator
- Anthony Edward Pevec: July 2, 1982
- Alexander James Quinn: December 5, 1983
- Roger William Gries: June 7, 2001
- Martin John Amos: June 7, 2001

Anthony Michael Pilla (November 12, 1932 – September 21, 2021) was an American prelate of the Roman Catholic Church. He served as an auxiliary bishop of the Diocese of Cleveland in Ohio from 1979 to 1981 and as bishop of the same diocese from 1981 to 2006.

== Biography ==
=== Early life ===
Anthony Pilla was born on November 12, 1932, in Cleveland, Ohio. He attended Cathedral Latin High School in Cleveland for several years before the family moved to Cincinnati. Pilla graduated in 1951 from Saint Gregory Seminary in Cincinnati, then went to study at Borromeo College in Wickliffe, Ohio, until 1955. Pilla completed his preparation for the priesthood at Saint Mary Seminary in Cleveland.

Pilla was ordained a priest by Bishop Floyd Begin for the Diocese of Cleveland on May 23, 1959.

=== Auxiliary Bishop of Cleveland ===
On June 30, 1979, Pope John Paul II named Pilla as titular bishop of Scardona and auxiliary bishop of the Diocese of Cleveland. He was consecrated by Bishop James Hickey on August 1, 1979. The principal co-consecrators were Bishops Clarence Issenmann and Joseph Francis.

Pilla was named apostolic administrator of the diocese on July 29, 1980, after Hickey was named archbishop of the Archdiocese of Washington.

=== Bishop of Cleveland ===
Pilla was named bishop of the Diocese of Cleveland on November 13, 1980, by Pope John Paul II. Pilla was installed on January 6, 1981. He was elected president of the National Conference of Catholic Bishops in November, 1995, serving until 1998.

In March 2002, Pilla published a list of 28 priests accused of sexual abuse of minors. Fifteen of them were 15 active priests, who Pilla suspended from ministry. Earlier that year Cuyahoga County Prosecutor William Mason announced an investigation to sexual abuse of minors by diocesan priests.

In 2005, 36 lay members of the diocese sued Pilla, accusing him of allowing $2 million in diocesan funds to be stolen. The judge dismissed the lawsuit, saying that the plaintiffs did not have the legal standing to sue in this case.

=== Retirement and legacy ===
On April 4, 2006, Pope Benedict XVI accepted Pilla's resignation as bishop of the Diocese of Cleveland. He was replaced by Auxiliary Bishop Richard Lennon on the same day.

In May 2008, Pilla testified for the prosecution in the embezzlement trial of Joseph Smith, the assistant treasurer for the Diocese of Cleveland. Smith had been accused of stealing $784,000 from the diocese through a kickback scheme with an accomplice. Smith's lawyers claimed that Pilla and other diocesan clergy were guilty of that theft. Pilla said that in 2004 he had received an anonymous letter accusing Smith of theft. After meeting with Pilla, Smith went on administrative lead and later resigned. In his testimony, Pilla praised Smith and said that he left the financial management of the diocese up to him. Smith was acquitted of embezzlement, but convicted of tax evasion; he received one year in prison.

In July 2011, an Ohio man sued Pilla and the Diocese of Cleveland, saying that their negligence allowed a priest to sexually abuse him when he was a boy. The plaintiff claimed that Patrick O’Connor, a diocesan priest at St. Jude Parish in Elyria, Ohio, abused him from 1997 to 1999 when he was a boy. Pilla knew that O'Connor had previously abused a child at St. Joseph Parish in Cuyahoga Falls, Ohio. The diocese had settled with that victim and sent O'Connor to Elyria. O'Connor pleaded guilty to corruption of a minor in 2009.

Anthony Pilla died in Cleveland on September 21, 2021, at age 88.

== See also ==
- Catholic Church hierarchy
- Catholic Church in the United States
- Historical list of the Catholic bishops of the United States
- List of Catholic bishops of the United States
- Lists of patriarchs, archbishops, and bishops

Catholic Church titles
Preceded by William H. Keeler	President of the NCCB/USCC; 1995–1998	Succeeded by Joseph Fiorenza
Preceded by James Aloysius Hickey	Bishop of Cleveland; 1980–2006	Succeeded by Richard Lennon
Preceded by -	Auxiliary Bishop of Cleveland; 1979–1980	Succeeded by -
