= Alexander James Quinn =

Auxiliary bishop of the Diocese of Cleveland (1932–2013)

His Excellency, The Most Reverend A. James Quinn
- Auxiliary Bishop of Cleveland
- See: Titular See of Socia
- Appointed: October 14, 1983
- In office: December 5, 1983 – June 14, 2008

Orders
- Ordination: May 24, 1958 by Edward Francis Hoban
- Consecration: December 5, 1983 by Anthony Michael Pilla

Personal details
- Born: April 8, 1932 Cleveland, Ohio, US
- Died: October 18, 2013 (aged 81) Westlake, Ohio, US
- Education: Cleveland State University; Pontifical Lateran University

Alexander James Quinn (April 8, 1932 – October 18, 2013) was an American prelate of the Catholic Church in the United States. He served as an auxiliary bishop of the Diocese of Cleveland in Ohio from 1983 until 2008.

== Biography ==
=== Early life ===
Alexander Quinn was born in Cleveland on April 8, 1932, to Alexander J. and Mary (Garvey) Quinn. He was educated at Saint Ignatius High School in Cleveland, then attended St. Charles College in Catonsville, Maryland, St. Mary's Seminary in Cleveland, and Cleveland State University.

=== Priesthood ===
Quinn was ordained a priest for the Diocese of Cleveland at the Cathedral of St. John the Evangelist in Cleveland on May 24, 1958 by Bishop Edward Francis Hoban.After his ordination, the diocese assigned Quinn as parochial vicar of the Cathedral parish. In 1959, he went to Rome to study canon law at the Pontifical Lateran University. He earned both a Doctor of Canon Law and Juris Doctor degrees.

Quinn was appointed assistant chancellor of the diocese in 1963 and promoter of justice of the tribunal in 1964. The Vatican in 1965 elevated him to the rank of papal chamberlain. Quinn became chancellor in 1968 and a member of the Board of Diocesan Consultors in 1971. Quinn in January 1982 was named pastor of St. Francis Xavier Parish in Medina, Ohio.

=== Auxiliary Bishop of Cleveland ===
On October 14, 1983, Pope John Paul II named Quinn as titular bishop of Socia and auxiliary bishop of Cleveland. He was consecrated by Bishop Anthony Pilla of Cleveland at the Cathedral of St. John the Evangelist on December 5, 1983. The principal co-consecrators were Archbishop Daniel Pilarczyk of Cincinnati and Auxiliary Bishop Gilbert Sheldon of Cleveland. Quinn served the diocese as an auxiliary bishop and as the vicar for the western region of the diocese for 24 years.

=== Retirement and legacy ===
Pope Benedict XVI accepted Quinn's resignation as auxiliary bishop of Cleveland on June 14, 2008. He then he took up residence at St. Ladislas Parish in Westlake, Ohio. Quinn died in Westlake on October 18, 2013, at age 81. After his funeral at the Cathedral of St. John the Evangelist, he was interred at Calvary Cemetery in Cleveland.
