= Lorain Catholic High School =

Coordinates: 41°26′17″N 82°10′36″W

Location
- 760 Tower Blvd. Lorain, Ohio 44052-5223; United States

Information
- Type: Private, Coeducational
- Religious affiliation: Catholic
- Established: 1969
- Closed: 2004
- Grades: 7-12
- Colors: Scarlet and Gray
- Slogan: We Are LC!
- Sports: Soccer, Basketball, Football
- Mascot: Spartan
- Team name: Spartans
- Rival: Elyria Catholic H.S. Panthers

Lorain Catholic High School was a private Catholic high school located in Lorain, Ohio, 30 miles west of Cleveland. It was run by the Catholic Diocese of Cleveland until 2001. Lorain Catholic then was governed by an independent board of directors until its closure in 2004.

== Overview ==
Lorain Catholic was built in 1969 and since has graduated more than 9,500 students. Lorain was the successor to the former Lorain Saint Marys High School. Lorain Catholic was one of only two Catholic high schools found in Lorain County.

The school colors were scarlet and gray. The mascot was the Spartan. The football team competed in the Toledo Area Athletic Conference (TAAC) from 1999 to 2004. A cornerstone of student life at Lorain Catholic was the tradition of painting one or both of the two large boulders on the campus. One was near the main entrance and the other on the driveway leaving the school on Tower Blvd. Students would paint the rock to raise spirit for big games. The Lorain Catholic Spartan basketball team coached by Jim Lawhead reached the state finals only to lose to Dayton Roth 82–81.

The last address was 760 Tower Boulevard Lorain, OH 44052-5223

== Notable alumni ==
- Steve Bailey, Former MLB player (Cleveland Indians)
