= Saint Mary Seminary and Graduate School of Theology =

Roman Catholic seminary in Wickliffe, Ohio

Coordinates: 41°35′53″N 81°28′59″W

Saint Mary Seminary and Graduate School of Theology in Wickliffe, Ohio, is a Roman Catholic seminary that serves the Roman Catholic Diocese of Cleveland. It was established in 1848 by the first bishop of the Diocese of Cleveland, Louis Amadeus Rappe.

== History ==
Bishop Louis Amadeus Rappe established the seminary in Cleveland in 1848 as St. Francis de Sales Seminary, a name it used for only a short time before becoming Saint Mary Seminary. In its first years, the seminary was housed in a former stable, but in 1859 it was moved to a new purpose-built structure at the corner of Lake and Hamilton Streets in Cleveland.

During the 1920s, the institution moved again, to a new building at Superior and Ansel Roads in Cleveland. In 1922, the institutional focus was changed to a college undergraduate program, meaning that seminarians from Cleveland studied theology at Mount St. Mary's Seminary in Cincinnati. However, the Cleveland seminary program resumed in 1929, and from 1929 to 1954, the Cleveland institution offered both undergraduate education and graduate theology training.

=== Borromeo College ===
In 1954, a separate undergraduate college program, known as Borromeo College (or Borromeo College Seminary), was started in Wickliffe on a campus formerly occupied by Marycrest School. Borromeo offered a liberal arts program and awarded bachelor's degrees to male students considering the possibility of entering the priesthood. In 1990 the St. Mary Seminary programs were moved to the Wickliffe location, while the Borromeo undergraduate program continues at John Carroll University.

== Programs ==
The seminary's main mission is to prepare students for Roman Catholic priesthood. It awards master's degrees in theology and divinity, as well as a Doctor of Ministry (D.Min.). As of 2009, about 130 students were enrolled.

== Accreditation ==
It has regional accreditation from the Higher Learning Commission of the North Central Association of Colleges and Schools and is an accredited member of the Association of Theological Schools in the United States and Canada.
