= Cathedral of St. John the Evangelist (Cleveland) =

Coordinates: 41.502836°N 81.688419°W

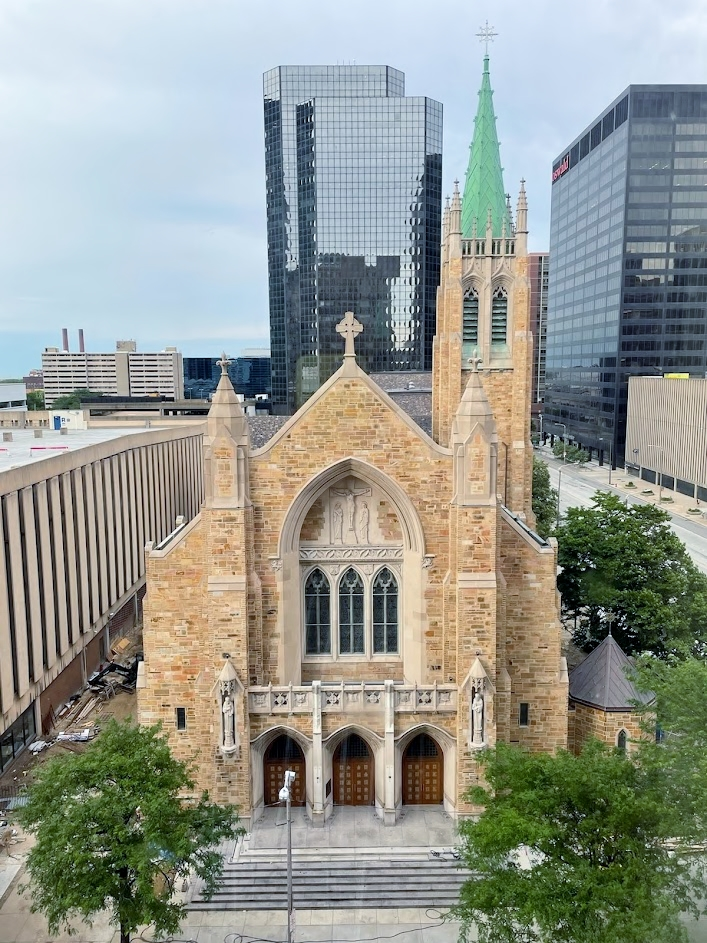
- Cathedral of St. John the Evangelist
- Cathedral of St. John the Evangelist
- Location: 1007 Superior Avenue, Cleveland, Ohio 44115
- Country: United States
- Denomination: Roman Catholic

Architecture
- Architect(s): Patrick Keely (1852), Stickle and Associates (1946–48)
- Years built: 1852

Administration
- Diocese: Cleveland

Clergy
- Bishop: Most Reverend Edward Charles Malesic
- Pastor: Reverend Joseph R. Mamich

The Cathedral of St. John the Evangelist (commonly referred to as St. John's Cathedral) is a historic Roman Catholic church building located in Cleveland, Ohio, in the United States. It is dedicated to the patron saint of the diocese, John the Evangelist

The Cathedral of St. John the Evangelist was completed and consecrated in 1852; it is the cathedral of the Roman Catholic Diocese of Cleveland. Numerous renovations have enlarged and changed some aspects of the cathedral, but it remains essentially the same since its construction. The cathedral has seating for approximately 1,500 worshippers

== History ==
=== 1830 to 1845 ===
By the 1830s, large numbers of Catholic immigrants were settling in the Western Reserve region of Ohio. During this period, visiting priests from the Archdiocese of Cincinnati would celebrate mass and perform sacraments for them in private homes and businesses.

A small group of Irish settlers established St. Mary's of the Flats Parish in 1826, the first parish in the diocese The congregation met in several locations before beginning construction on its own church in 1837. In 1845, the pastor of St. Mary's, seeing the need for a larger church, purchased a land parcel on East 9th Street in the city.

=== 1845 to 1900 ===
Pope Pius IX established the Diocese of Cleveland in 1847 and named Louis Amadeus Rappe as its first bishop.

Seeing that St. Mary's was too inadequate and remote to serve as a cathedral, he decided to build a new one on the East 9th Street property. Rappe hired architect Patrick Keely, a designer of churches around the country, to design the new cathedral. Rapp laid the cornerstone for the new structure on October 22, 1848. Due to the diocese's lack of money, Rappe was forced to fundraise for the cathedral in New York City and France. The Cathedral of St. John the Evangelist was finished and dedicated in 1852.

In 1857, the diocese opened a boys' school for the St. John Parish on the cathedral campus. A girls' school and cathedral hall were added in 1867. The diocese in 1876 was finally able to complete the interior and exterior decoration of St. John, adding a limestone trim on the exterior walls. A spire was added to the cathedral roof in 1879.

In 1884, the diocese installed stained glass windows and walnut furnishings in the cathedral sanctuary. Eighteen years later, in 1902, these windows were replaced with art glass windows from Munich in the Kingdom of Bavaria.

=== 1943 to 1960 ===
In 1920, St. John was the setting for the funeral of Ray Chapman, a shortstop for the Cleveland Indians of the American League. He had suffered a fatal head injury during a baseball game after being hit by a baseball. Thousands of mourners gathered inside and outside St. John for one of the largest funerals in Cleveland history.

The high school division of St. John School closed in 1927; it was replaced by Sisters College, an institution for the training of teachers. In 1935, the Seventh National Eucharistic Congress was held in Cleveland, with services and other events held at St. John. Bishop Joseph Schrembs announced plans in 1943 to renovate St. John. However, due to the American involvement in World War II, the plan was postponed. That same year, the elementary school division of the St. John School closed; Sisters College took over its property.

With the end of World War II in 1945, Bishop Edward Francis Hoban was able to begin the renovation of St. John in 1946. The architectural firm of Stickle, Kelly and Stickle of Cleveland oversaw the project. The contractors enlarged the cathedral and constructed a bell tower. They refaced the brick exterior in orange sandstone from Crab Orchard, Tennessee. John W. Winterich and Associates of Cleveland Heights, Ohio, supervised the creation of a new reredos behind the altar and other interior decoration. St. John's College moved out of the cathedral campus in 1947. On September 4, 1948, Hoban and Cardinal Francis Spellman of the Archdiocese of New York rededicated St. John the Evangelist Cathedral.

=== 1960 to 2000 ===
In 1977, Bishop James Hickey renovated St. John to comply with liturgical reforms mandated by the Second Vatican Council of the early 1960s. The diocese moved the altar from the apse to its current location in the crossing. This was the approximate location of the altar when the cathedral was constructed in 1852. In 1981, the diocese leased the site of its offices in Cathedral Square to developers, who demolished the existing structures and built the high rise Eaton Center.

The St. John parishioners raised funds in 1988 to install bells in the bell tower. In 1996, the Italian American community funded the renovation of the sacristy in celebration of Bishop Anthony Pilla's election as president of the United States Conference of Catholic Bishops. In 1997, the diocese celebrated its 150th anniversary. That year, ABC-TV produced a special on the cathedral, titled Celebrating Christ’s Splendor.

=== 2000 to present ===
Pilla dedicated a holy door in St. John as part of the holy year of 2000 proclaimed by Pope John Paul II. In 2002, the diocese renovated the cathedral flagpole, rededicating it on September 11, 2002, in honor of those killed in the attacks of September 11, 2001. In 2007, the diocese relocated its offices again to create a parking lot for shoppers and a parking garage for St. John parishioners.

During the 2010s, the diocese replaced the lighting in St. John with LED fixtures. The diocese in 2016 refinished the pews and wainscoting to match the wood in the sanctuary. The diocese in 2026 announced that it would be replastering and painting interior walls, upgrading the lighting and creating a Blessed Sacrament Chapel in the nave.

== Cathedral Interior ==
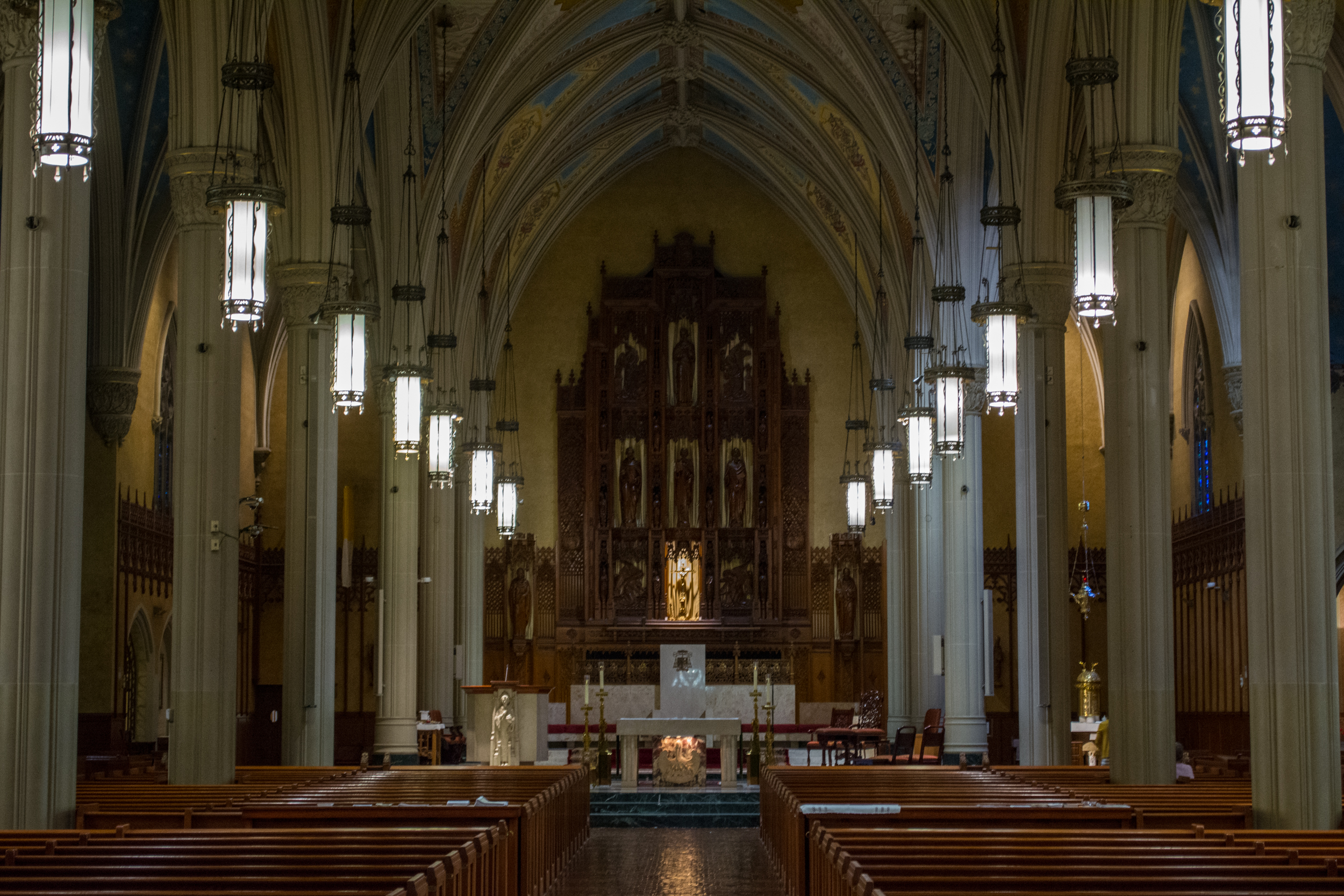
Interior, Cathedral of St. John the Evangelist (2018)

=== Ambo ===
The ambo, or pulpit, displays a carved stone figure of Saint Stephen.

=== Pipe organ ===
The pipe organ was constructed by the Holtkamp Organ Company of Cleveland. It was installed during the cathedral renovation of the 1940s. The organ has consoles in the loft and behind the cathedra.The pipe organ has 4368 pipes, organized in 72 ranks and seven divisions. Fifty-four of the organ ranks are located above the main entrance. The remaining 18 ranks are hidden behind the reredos.

=== Rededos ===
The rededos behind the altar is composed of 850 pieces of hand-carved Appalachian Oak. It displays carvings of John the Evangelist, along with the apostles Peter and Paul. Statues of the apostles Matthew, Mark and Luke sit below the rededos.

=== Sanctuary ===
Within the sanctuary, the altar top is composed of Botticino marble, along with the supporting pillars. The altar top displays an image of a pelican, an historic symbol of the eucharist.

=== Stained glass ===
The cathedral has a series of stained glass windows that depict scenes from the Catholic liturgical calendar:

- Annunciation
- Nativity
- Presentation in the Temple
- Jesus Teaching in the Temple
- Last Supper
- Resurrection
- Ascension
- Assumption of the Blessed Virgin
- Redemption through Christ

== Chapels ==
The interior of St. John contains three chapels:

=== Mary Chapel ===
The Mary Chapel is located in the south transept of the cathedral. It contains a statue of the Virgin Mary above a white marble altar; a rose window with a dove image is mounted above the statue. The chapel wall displays a mural showing the Annunciation, the Nativity, a band of apostles and a band of angels.

=== Resurrection Chapel ===
The Resurrection Chapel in the cathedral houses the tombs of the bishops of Cleveland, along with the relics of Christine of Calixtus, a Catholic saint.

A marble altar stands in the center of the chapel floor, surrounded by the tombs. Two panels on the sides of the altar depict the death of Christ. A statue of the risen Christs is mounted above the altar. The ceiling is a mosaic of blue Venetian glass. The north wall of the chapel displays the apostles Paul and Peter, the south wall The figures Aaron, David, and Melchizedek.

The relics of Christine of Calixtus are housed under the altar. She was a 13- or 14-year-old girl who was executed around 300 CE. Pope Pius XI present the relics to Bishop Joseph Schrembs for residence in St. John Cathedral in 1925. These were the first relics of a female saint to be given by the Vatican to an American diocese.

=== Sacred Heart Chapel ===
The Sacred Heart Chapel contains a bronze statue of John the Evangelist along with a bronze Pieta statue. A statue of the Sacred Heart is also located in the chapel. The back wall of the chapel displays a mural with symbols and figures from the Book of Revelations in the New Testaments.These symbols include trumpets, seals, vials, the Four Horsemen of the Apocalypse, and the Woman of the Apocalypse.

== Cathedral exterior ==
=== Bell tower ===
The six bells in the cathedral bell tower range from 375 lb (170 kg) to 3,300 lb (1,500 kg). They are named for saints and blesseds who played a role in American history. The bells first rang to celebrate the Christmas masses in 1988.

=== Front entrance ===
The front entrance of the cathedral has three oak doors with 60 bronze panels. Each door represents a figure from the Trinity. The entrance is surrounded by statues of the apostles Peter, Paul, John, the Virgin Mary and a Crucifixion scene.

== See also ==
- List of churches in the Roman Catholic Diocese of Cleveland
- List of Catholic cathedrals in the United States
- List of cathedrals in the United States
