= St. Casimir Church (Cleveland) =

Coordinates: 41.5243°N 81.6304°W

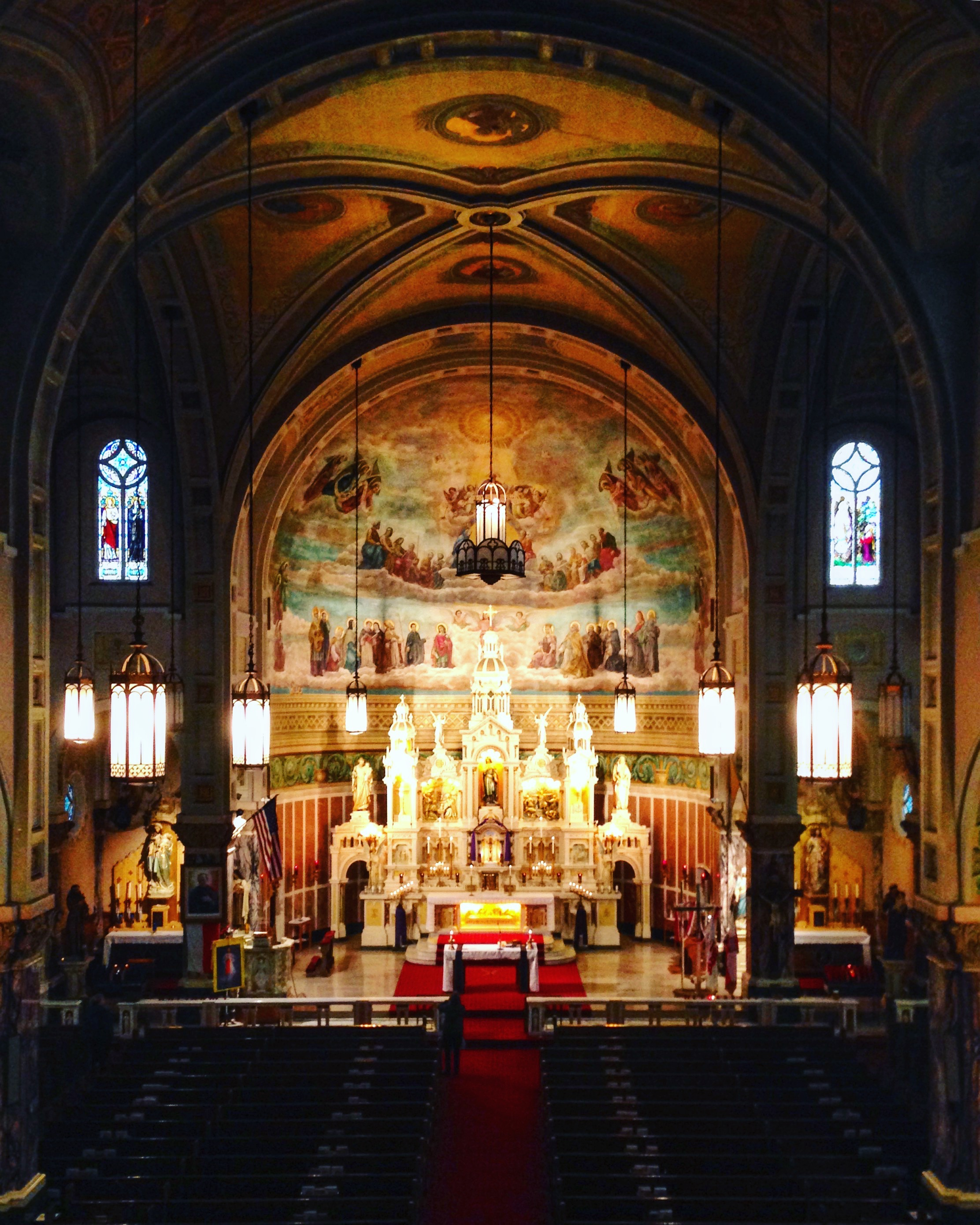
- The altar, side altars, and nave of St. Casimir Church on March 13, 2016, following Cleveland Mass Mob XX
- St. Casimir Church
- Denomination: Roman Catholic Church

History
- Status: Parish church
- Founder: Rev. Fr. Benedict Rosinski
- Dedication: St. Casimir

Architecture
- Functional status: Active
- Architect: William Jansen
- Architectural type: Church
- Style: Polish Cathedral Romanesque
- Completed: 1918

Administration
- Province: Cincinnati
- Diocese: Cleveland

Clergy
- Pastor: Rev. Fr. Eric Orzech

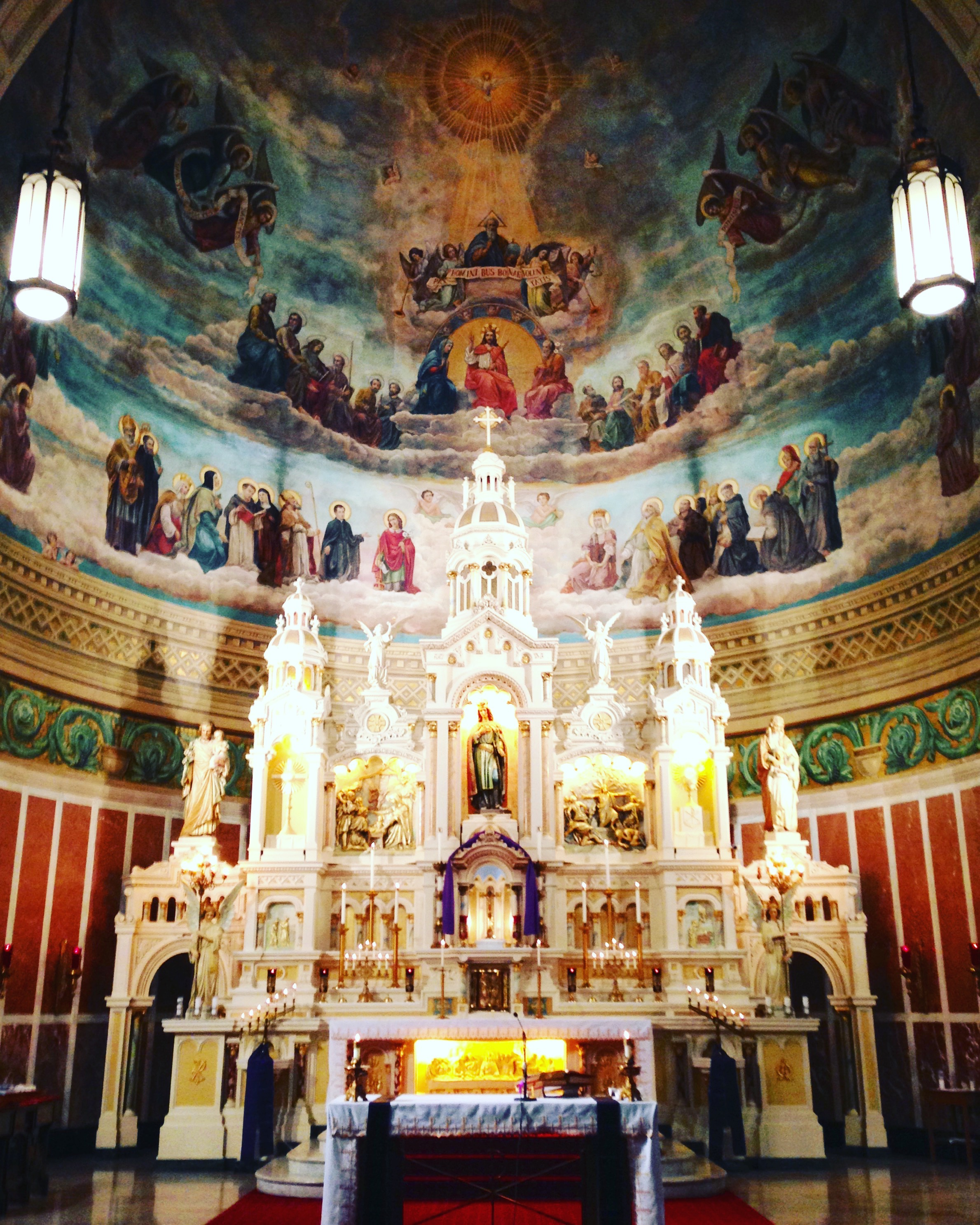
Detail of high altar and mural in St. Casimir Church. Altar made in Rigalico, marble and onyx effect, specially designed and executed in the studios of Daprato Statuary Company, Chicago.

Saint Casimir Church (Polish: Parafia św. Kazimierza w Cleveland) is a Catholic parish church in Cleveland, Ohio, and part of the Roman Catholic Diocese of Cleveland. It is designated "a personal parish for those Catholics of the Latin Rite of Polish descent" in Cleveland. A personal parish is designated under Canon 518 of the 1983 Code of Canon Law. It is located at the north-east corner of intersection of East 82nd St. and Sowiniski Ave., in a part of the St. Clair-Superior neighborhood previously known in Polish as na Poznaniu.

Both the church building and the school building are GNIS named features. The church building is listed as a Cleveland Designated Landmark.

== History ==
To provide properly for the large and steadily increasing number of Poles in the north-eastern part of Cleveland it was necessary to organize them into the third Polish congregation within the limits of the city. They lived too far away from St. Stanislaus Church, with which they had been affiliated, for them to conveniently either attend Mass or for their children to attend the parish school. (Note: Using Google Maps, the walking distance between the Shrine Church of St. Stanislaus and St. Casimir Church is about 5.4 mi (8.7 km).) They therefore petitioned Bishop Richard Gilmour for permission to form a new parish and build a church for their own use. In December 1891, Monsignor Felix Boff, V.G., administrator of the diocese, granted the required permission. Those parishioners left to form St. Casimir Church in 1891.

=== Founding ===
The parish was founded in 1891—about 44 years after the Diocese of Cleveland was erected by Pope Pius IX.

=== Nineteenth century ===
In December, 1891, Boff appointed Father Benedict Rosinski, pastor of St. Adalbert's, Berea, Ohio, to take charge of the mission. (Note: Using Google Maps, the walking distance between St. Casimir Church in Cleveland and St. Adalbert church in Berea is about 18 mi (29 km).)

On January 7, 1892-01-07, Mr. Joseph Hoffman, a Catholic, and a large property owner in that part of Cleveland, donated for church purposes a parcel of land, 200 ft (61 m) by 244 ft (74 m), bounded by Pulaski St., Kossuth (East 82nd St.), and Sowinski St. At the intersection of Pulaski St. and East 82nd St., the foundation for a combination brick church and school was begun in April, 1892, and on May 15, Boff was delegated by Bishop Ignatius Frederick Horstmann to lay the cornerstone. The ceremony was attended by a large multitude, who braved the very inclement weather on that day. Boff preached the English language sermon and Rosinski addressed the congregation in the Polish language.

Cerveny labored faithfully, even in the face of financial difficulties and a somewhat unruly element. At his request he was transferred to St. Ladislas' Church, Cleveland, and was succeeded on September 16, 1894, by Father Sigmund Wozny, who had just then come to the diocese. During 1895 Wozny had the church property enclosed by a fence, and replaced the chairs with pews, besides making other necessary improvements. Like his immediate predecessor, he found an unruly element to deal with, which, with the comparatively large parish debt, about $17,000, discouraged him, and hence he asked to be relieved from his unpleasant pastoral charge. His wish was granted, and he left the diocese in February, 1896 and was at once succeeded by Father Francis X. Fremel, who set courageously to work to put men and things to rights. He too met with opposition at the start, but with prudence and firmness he soon succeeded in surmounting the difficulties that beset him. Under his direction, seconded by the generosity of the people, the interior of the church was ornamented quite neatly, and all the requisites for divine service procured. At the same time he did not lose sight of the funded debt, but strained every nerve to have it reduced.

Because of ill health (tuberculosis of the throat). Fremel was obliged to resign his pastorate and move to California. He left in April, 1899, after a faithful service of a little over three years. On May 10, 1899, he was succeeded by Father Casimir Lazinski, who at once made many necessary improvements in and around the church property, at an outlay of about $2,000.

Owing to lack of a sewer the basement of St. Casimir's Church became filled with surface water, which remained stagnant. The Board of Health, in 1896, ordered the school closed and checked for sickness among the children. The school remained closed for two years, until the sewer was built by the city.

=== Twentieth century ===
As of 1903, the school was operated by three Felician Sisters, of Detroit, and had an attendance of over 200 children.

On July 5, 1973, Father Leon Telesz was appointed pastor.

The school closed in 1976.

=== Twenty-first century ===
==== Vibrant Parish Life ====
Pope John Paul II's 1999 Ecclesia in America states that, the institution of the parish, while it retains its importance, is facing difficulties, especially in large urban areas, in fulfilling its mission and needs constant renewal to be effective.

Bishop Anthony Pilla, initiated a pastoral planning process entitled Vibrant Parish Life, to study the vibrancy of parish communities, and possible sharing of resources among those parishes.

Pilla wrote in his pastoral letter Vibrant Parish Life that,

My resistance to formulating an aggressive and sweeping plan for parish consolidations or closings is that, rather than "fixing" a fundamental problem or strengthening the faith of the people, the actual result is that people experience tremendous pain and alienation. I do not believe that building vibrant parish life can be legislated. It must involve initiative at the local community level and be embraced willingly with the heart by those most affected.

On April 4, 2006, titular Bishop Richard Lennon was appointed Bishop of Cleveland by Pope Benedict XVI. He continued this study, in conformity with Canon 50.

The pastoral planning process had considered broad diocesan trends concerning the situation of the declining number of the clergy and the ratio of priests-to-faithful, the general location of parish communities and churches, weekly attendance at Sunday Mass, finances, with a special emphasis on the vibrancy of the parish communities, judged by the above and other predetermined factors. Although Pilla recognized that a unique "quality of parish life is a reality in many places" and "richness and diversity are a treasure to be preserved" and that many parishes "founded with strong ethnic roots that were and continue to be important in sustaining people's faith", he wrote that, "We need catechesis in order for our people to understand and support this vision of vibrant parish life." A similar process of consolidation, which also included sales of assets, described in BusinessWeek as a solution that "could revolutionize the way dioceses manage their affairs nationwide", took place in the Archdiocese of Chicago under Cardinal Joseph Bernardin the archbishop of Chicago during the 1990s.

The Vibrant Parish Life process in Cleveland included an examination of the possible "closing" of this Parish, a personal parish for those Catholics of the Latin Rite of Polish descent along with 8 other of the 14 personal parishes for those of Polish descent in Cleveland.

Pilla wrote that Vibrant Parish Life was to be implemented "on an area-by-area basis." This parish was not included in a cluster which represented parishes from the district near the Church, but rather was placed together with two parishes of Polish descent and another parish which were located elsewhere in the city, several miles away, in the area referred to by Lennon as "Broadway/Slavic Village", instead of the area known as "Cleveland Ward 7" where the parish is located. A personal parish does not have territory.

During the week of April 16, 2007, the 18th National Convention of the Polish American Priests' Association was held in Cleveland; one cardinal, eight bishops, and 78 priests attended. They were welcomed by Telesz to St. Casimir Church, one of the places visited, were Auxiliary Bishop Ryszard Karpiński, of the Diocese of Lublin, Poland, the Polish Episcopal Conference Delegate for Polonia Abroad, along with Fr. David W. Bialkowski of the Diocese of Buffalo, New York, led in the recitation of the rosary, alternating decades, in English and Polish. Then, Fr. Leonard F. Chrobot, PhD, of the Diocese of Fort Wayne-South Bend presented a lecture about "the changing nature of our Polish communities and the generational differences among the people who now make-up Polonia." Afterwards, the convention participants travelled to the Cathedral of St. John the Evangelist where Lennon concelebrated Mass.

In a November 20, 2008, press release describing a meeting between a delegation of the Polish Episcopal Conference and representatives of the United States Conference of Catholic Bishops (USCCB) about pastoral work with migrants, Father Allan F. Deck, SJ, PhD, executive director of the USCCB's Secretariat of Cultural Diversity in the Church (SCDC), pointed out that experts on religious trends in the United States, such as Robert D. Putnam, PhD, professor of public policy at John F. Kennedy School of Government at Harvard University, have noted that maintaining cultural identity is a factor in preserving religious identity. Deck said that "the historical commitment of the Polish American community to maintaining its culture and Catholic identity while also adapting to U.S. culture is one of the more outstanding models of how the process unfolds."

On February 3, 2009, with a stated view of fulfilling the requirements of Canon 515§2, Lennon heard the opinions of the members of the Presbyteral Council regarding the proposal to close the Parish.

On February 23, 2009, it was reported that Rev. Mr. James J. Armstrong, deacon at St. Wendelin in Cleveland, a media and public relations expert, (Note: Armstrong was the Director of Public and Media Relations at the Akron General Medical Center in Akron, Ohio. He also was Director of News and Information at the Cleveland Clinic. He has worked in radio, television news, and public affairs for more than 25 years. He earned three local Emmy Awards for his work as a television journalist, which included 13 years at NBC affiliated television station WKYC where he helped oversee news coverage from 1978 to 1991. He served a term, 2003–2007, on the National Institutes of Health Director's Council of Public Representatives, a federal advisory committee.) was hired to take inventory in the closed churches and oversee distribution of the objects. (Note: Armstrong is named as a Special Assistant to the Bishop for Reconfiguration of parishes, in the Consolidation Manual, appointed to "assist the parishes in the process of closing their parishes and provide resources to help them in doing this" also to "oversee the particulars of the directives stated in the Consolidation Manual. The Special Assistant will provide support and on site guidance to local leadership of parishes in carrying out the procedures of the manual.")

On March 12, 2009, by letter to the pastor and subsequent announcement in the Church, Lennon communicated his decision to "close" and merge the Parish with the de facto closing of the Church, clearly indicating that the Church would no longer be allowed to be used for any function of worship and the Church would be fenced off so as to prevent the faithful from approaching, thereby executing the provisions of Canon 1222§2 without implementing its procedures.

==== Closing ====
After Lennon's closing announcement, conversations about feelings and solidarity began to appear in Polish publications.

On March 23, 2009, and on March 26, 2009, parishioners made written requests to Lennon to amend his decree, in accord with canon 1734. Diocese spokesman Robert Tayek wrote that, "Clearly, any appeal must be well grounded and experience shows that such appeals succeed only under unusual circumstances."

On March 25, 2009, a management guide to the consolidation process, the Consolidation Manual, was published by the diocese; it was meant to clarify and prioritize defined tasks as well as to provide planning tools and instruments to accomplish those defined tasks.

Lennon rejected the first request on April 14, 2009, and rejected the second request on April 23, 2009.

On April 23, 2009 and on May 2, 2009, parishioners of the Parish made hierarchical recourse; they petitioned that the Congregation for the Clergy issue a decree declaring the decree imposed by Lennon to be null and void and of no juridical effect.

With plainclothes police inside the church and a heavy presence of uniformed police outside, on November 8, 2009, Lennon presided over a closing Mass which protesters called a "Mass of Eviction". (Note: The term "Mass of Eviction" was used by protesters of the closings and suppressions. It is not a term used by the Catholic Church. The Roman Catholic Diocese of Cleveland used the term "closing Mass" for this type of event. The event, as described and mostly called a "closing ceremony" in the Consolidation Manual, consists of a matrix of optional events that may include what the Consolidation Manual describes as gatherings before the final Mass followed by a Mass, which could include an optional concluding ceremony. The optional concluding ceremony may also be outside the context of a Mass.) He and the city were surprised by a large number of the congregation walking out on him, before he delivered his remarks. This began when a ninety-six-year-old altar server, Władysław Szylwian, a survivor of imprisonment and forced labor, as a prisoner of war for five years, in Nazi concentration camps including Bergen-Belsen from which he was liberated, disconnected power to the microphone. Then in a nonviolent resistance act of public social rejection, reminiscent of the scene in the film Casablanca, the congregation sang "Boże, coś Polskę", "Serdeczna Matko", and other songs. (Note: "Boże, coś Polskę" was the anthem of the January Uprising. Music historian Maja Trochimczyk, PhD, wrote that, "Boże, coś Polskę" is "a solemn prayer for the nation, included in all Catholic Church songbooks, and sung in Polish churches", and "has always been the most intense prayer for independence and peace." It is a symbol of resistance.) A woman in her 80s who had spent 10 years in a Communist prison reflected that, even the Communists were afraid to close churches.

The Cleveland Catholic Diocese Property Sales website describes that many parishes assets are "unique and special properties" often "built in ways that can not be reasonably or affordably duplicated today". The asking price for St. Casimir was listed as $975,000; the church building, but not typically school building, rectory or convent, if sold, would have had a restrictive covenant or "deed restriction to preclude certain sordid uses". On February 8, 2010, a group of parishioners wrote to the diocese protesting the diocese's removal of sacred objects and demanded an inventory, while their Vatican appeal was pending. Although the removal of sacred objects and eventual sale online with the help of a local religious-goods store, Henninger's in Parma, Ohio, are typical steps in closing a church, the removal of sacred objects was called a "dismemberment and destruction" by parishioners. Some saw it as steps in a "barbaric euthanizing" of their healthy parish. Lennon said restoring a parish would require "the return of sacred objects that were removed for safekeeping..." (Note: The respectfully removal of religious objects should be an important step in the process of abandoning a church. Sometimes, this step is not completed. For example, St. John the Baptist Church, in the Lawrenceville neighborhood of Pittsburgh, was suppressed by Bishop Donald Wuerl on August 6, 1993 as part of The Parish Reorganization and Revitalization Project. The Roman Catholic Diocese of Pittsburgh then sold the Church to a developer, but the diocese failed to remove many religious items. The Church Brew Works, a microbrewery and restaurant, opened for business on August 1, 1996 in the redeveloped church building with many religious items, including stained glass windows depicting religious subjects, in place.) The diocese could not, under the internal law governing the church, sell a church or its contents while it was under appeal.

The parish Church was closed and it was declared that the Mass and devotional visits were never again to take place within the Church building, the Church building was locked and the fence was locked. After a church closes, Bradford Mckee wrote in Architect magazine that, "The container of countless shared and private memories surrounding births, marriages, and deaths has been sealed shut, and its comforts can no longer be reached."

After the suppression of this St. Casimir Parish, while the status of both the parish suppression and the church closure were in the appeal process, the name St. Casimir, a core identity of this parish, was assigned to another Catholic parish and church also in Cleveland, Ohio and also part of the Roman Catholic Diocese of Cleveland. That other St. Casimir, was established in October 2009, from the suppressed Our Lady of Perpetual Help Parish and the suppressed St. George Parish and is located at the site of the suppressed Our Lady of Perpetual Help Parish.

==== Prayer vigils ====
On November 15, 2009, parishioners began prayer vigils, on the street, in front of the shuttered church. They prayed for 139 consecutive Sundays. They prayed weekly, every Sunday at 11:30am, for its reopening.

The prayer vigils were visited and documented by the local print and broadcast media.

Some national attention also focused on St. Casimir and other ethnic parishes trying to remain in existence. For example, Ralph Vartabedian wrote in the Los Angeles Times that, "The communities are not going down without a fight. They have marched on the Cathedral of St. John the Evangelist in downtown Cleveland and petitioned the church courts in Rome. Each Sunday, a group of Poles gathers outside the closed St. Casimir Church on the northeastern side of the city, praying and singing the Polish national anthem."

St. Casimir being the first locally to pray in street exile, and the most exuberant, so much so that some of the services becoming a rally for all the parishes. Joseph Feckanin in an interview with Forum, a newsletter published by the John Paul II Polish-American Cultural Center in Cleveland, Ohio, said that, "Our presence there, at the doors of the church, in the cold and snow, in the rain and storms, shows others what is happening." He further explained they are defending their faith as Catholics. "We pray for the Church, for the bishops, for our faith. We want to protect our Church from what the bishops are trying to do," he said.

From St. Casimir's example, similar continuous Sunday street prayer circles were instituted at Saint Patrick's in the West Park section of Cleveland (they would call each other at the beginning of the vigil to synchronize starts), and St. Emeric. Intermittent prayer circles came to St. Wendelin in Cleveland, and St. James in Lakewood, Ohio. Singular parish gatherings in the street occurred at St. Barbara's in Cleveland, St. Stanislaus in Lorain, Ohio, and St. Margaret Mary in South Euclid, Ohio.

In other places, including Boston, people occupied suppressed churches for years. (Note: St. James the Great Church in Wellesley, Massachusetts, part of the Roman Catholic Archdiocese of Boston, was occupied, since it was closed in 2004, more than seven years. St. Stanislaus Kostka Church in Adams, Massachusetts and part of the Roman Catholic Diocese of Springfield was occupied, in shifts, for 1,150 days and nights by more than 200 protesting parishioners. St. Therese Church in Everett, Massachusetts, part of the Roman Catholic Archdiocese of Boston, was occupied for over 1,000 days.) The Cleveland Diocese arranged with courts and police to prevent similar activities here. For example, after St. John the Baptist in Akron, Ohio had its final Mass, on Halloween 2009, a small group, about a dozen people, held a sit-in for nearly two hours, until Akron Police enforced a temporary restraining order, signed by a Summit County, Ohio magistrate ordering that the church be vacated, by ordering the protesters to leave. The protesters complied. Another example is St. Emeric Church in Cleveland. After Lennon was informed that a boycott of the final Mass, scheduled for June 30, 2010, was being organized, he cancelled the final Mass. A Liturgy of Benediction, without Lennon, took place instead. A group of protesters then locked themselves inside the church; and, the next day Cleveland Police ordered the protesters to leave. The protesters complied.

An April 18, 2001 press release described a two-day meeting between representatives of the Polish National Catholic Church (PNCC) and representatives of the USCCB about, among other items, what the press release describes as "several cases of local misunderstandings, most of which had to do with a perception by Roman Catholic authorities that PNCC clergy, in an effort to make converts, had taken advantage of situations where Roman Catholic parishes had been closed." It is unclear if Lennon's actions led to people leaving in this diocese. (Note: It was alluded to. And, about 450 members of St. Peter Church left in schism and incorporated in 2009 as a 501(c) organization under the name The Community of Saint Peter.)

On June 7, 2011, Jason Berry's Render Unto Rome was released. On June 24, 2011-06-24, correspondent Marco Tosatti of La Stampa's Vatican Insider website, reported that,

A "classic" negative example of the reorganisation linked to the economic problems is that of Cleveland, where the Holy See has decided to send an apostolic visit, or rather, an investigation to look into whether the decisions taken by [...] Lennon were adequate. [...] The reasons that prompted the decision to close parishes in Cleveland have been the flow of population to outlying areas, the financial difficulties that have seen 42% of parish budgets finish in the red and the shortage of priests. Now this last point is questioned by the Vatican and the apostolic visit will serve to ascertain the facts. The Vatican has asked Lennon to stop his policy of savage cuts. In Boston, amongst many other controversies, he closed 60 parishes.

Tosatti used Lennon's management as an example of why the Congregation for the Clergy will release a document "specifically dedicated to the reorganization of American dioceses". The article implied a connection between economic repercussions of Catholic sex abuse cases in the United States and how other dioceses manage finances. Such rumors of investigations were addressed by Lennon with a July 11, 2011 press release, after the publication date of Render Unto Rome, the same day that the apostolic visitor began "interviewing priests and parishioners about how they perceive Lennon as a spiritual leader", and days after the chancery had denied such a visit he said,

While I am confident that I am faithfully handling the responsibilities entrusted to me, I personally made this request earlier this year because a number of persons have written to Rome expressing their concerns about my leadership of the Diocese. This visit will be an opportunity to gather extensive information on all aspects of the activities of the Diocese and will allow for an objective assessment of my leadership.

On April 28, 2006, Tosatti presented "The media's agenda vs. the Church's agenda: a journalist's perspective" during the Fifth International Seminar on Church Communications at the Pontifical University of the Holy Cross. He said, during the academic conference, that, "What journalists hope to find in a Church communications office is credibility, sincerity and availability." (Note: The 1971 pastoral instruction, ordered by the Second Vatican Council, on the means of social communication, Communio et Progressio specifies that, "On her part, the Church is consequently bound in duty to give complete and entirely accurate information to the news agencies so that they, in their turn, can carry out their task;" it is paraprased and cited, over 26 years later, in United States Catholic Conference's The Pastoral Plan for Church Communication as, "The Church must tell the truth in a timely fashion and is accountable for doing so." Communio et Progressio also warns, about secrecy, that, "When ecclesiastical authorities are unwilling to give information or are unable to do so, then rumour is unloosed and rumour is not a bearer of the truth but carries dangerous half-truths. Secrecy should therefore be restricted to matters that involve the good name of individuals or that touch upon the rights of people whether singly or collectively." The diocese seems to have a policy of blacklisting, for one reason or another, some news media. Tayek wrote, in the context of a request made by the National Catholic Reporter for comments about the schismatic Community of St. Peter and its pastor, that, "it is the policy of the Catholic Diocese of Cleveland not to respond to the National Catholic Reporter." And, a few years earlier, in the context of a request made by Cleveland Scene for comments about PBS's Frontline documentary Hand of God, he responded that, "We really don't talk to the tabloids.") Father John Zuhlsdorf, in his blog What Does the Prayer Really Say?, described Tosatti as "much more on the conservative side of Church issues" than some other members of the Italian press. In the same post, "Indiscrezioni tridentine", although about the Tridentine Mass, Zuhlsdorf wrote that, in the context of Vatican internal politics, rumors are not accurate news but news leaks do suggest stories; he described indiscrezione by quoting and translating Tosatti. (Note: Tosatti wrote in Italian, "[...] testo è blindatissimo; ma secondo indiscrezioni di ottima fonte [...]"; which Zuhlsdorf translated into English as, "[...] text is highly protected ('blindatissimo' = 'very heavily armoured'); but according to leaks ('indiscrezioni') from a very good source [...]".) Tosatti's opinion of Vatican news leaks was also broadcast on the May 28, 2012 CBS Evening News report about the Vatileaks scandal. The Italian noun indiscrezione is defined as gossip, indiscretion, leak; and, indiscretion, impertinence, inquisitiveness.

An Apostolic Visit is a rare event and it is also rare for a bishop to call for such an investigation. The Holy See sent Bishop Emeritus John Mortimer Smith, of the Roman Catholic Diocese of Trenton, New Jersey, to visit the diocese. The July 11, 2011 press release also announced that Smith will submit a report to the Holy See. The last time such a public apostolic visitation occurred in the United States was in Seattle in 1983. Smith interviewed an estimated 25 to 30 people over five days. Pilla declined to say whether he met with Smith. After Smith left, it was not clear whether he finished his inquiry. Lakewood based FutureChurch, a church reform organization not affiliated with the Catholic Diocese of Cleveland, called on the Vatican to make Smith's findings public. Neither Smith nor the Diocese of Cleveland nor Diocese of Trenton further commented on Smith's visit.

On March 1, 2012, the Congregation of the Clergy rendered a combined verdict on both appeals of St. Casimir parishioners.

When word arrived in Cleveland on March 7, 2012 a prayer vigil celebration was held at St. Casimir's.

On March 7, 2012, a Wednesday, Borre informed the Associated Press that the Congregation for the Clergy ruled, the previous week, that Lennon failed to follow church laws and procedures; and the Associated Press reported in the same article, that Tayek said Lennon received documents on the case Wednesday but had not yet reviewed them.

While closed parishes around the diocese celebrated the Vatican decree, which struck down Lennon's ruling on both procedural and substantive grounds, the diocese waited to receive official notification from the Apostolic Nunciature. By March 8, 20122012-03-08, Tayek explained he was told the documents had been delivered Wednesday but were subsequently identified as only unofficial copies of the documents. In what could be described as an example of indiscrezione, Tayek pointed out, "Someone in the Vatican gave at least a couple of the documents involved to Peter Borre, and he evidently shared them" in what Tayek described as part of a "really unusual" situation.

On March 12, 2012, the Diocesan Department of Communications announced that, "The Diocese has not formally received from the Vatican any decrees from the Congregation of Clergy concerning parish appeals; subsequently, no response is available at this time." That same day, the National Catholic Reporter wrote that Borre surmised, "I received these decrees legitimately on Monday [March 5], so I find it passing strange that the bishop of a major diocese is still claiming that the check is in the mail, so to speak, but strange things happen."

On March 14, 2012, Lennon, through a press release from the Diocesan Department of Communications announced that, "As indicated in my previous statement, I promised to inform you when I had received from the Vatican Congregation for Clergy decrees associated with parish appeals. The decrees arrived on Wednesday, March 14, 2012. The process to review these rulings will now be undertaken with my advisors."

Lennon announced, on March 27, 2012, that, "With the help of a number of advisors – including members of the clergy, laity and experts in church law – I am carefully studying and seeking to fully understand the decrees. I can assure you that this is not nearly as clear-cut as it may appear on the surface. Although the decrees are brief in length, they are deep in underlying meaning and I continue to receive significant input and clarification."

==== Vatican Decree ====
Fourteen parishes appealed to the Congregation for Clergy. Decree Protocol Number 20120457, dated March 1, 2012, and signed by Cardinal Mauro Piacenza, Prefect, and Titular Archbishop Celso Morga Iruzubieta, Secretary, is the Congregation for the Clergy decree specific to the St. Casimir appeals. The other parishes, which petitioned the Congregation for the Clergy, have decrees specific to their appeals. Appeals of twelve parishes were upheld and two were denied.

Sister Kate Kuenstler, PHJC, JCD, a Canon lawyer, in her commentary on this series of decrees, (Note: Kuenstler used Decree Protocol Number 20120293, specific to the appeals about St. James Parish in Lakewood, Ohio; also dated March 1, 2012, and signed by both Piacenza and Iruzubieta; as her primary source. For comparison, other decrees in this series of decrees also include: Decree Protocol Number 20120461, specific to the appeals about St. Emeric Parish in Cleveland, Ohio, and Decree Protocol Number 20120480, specific to the appeals about St Patrick Parish in Cleveland, Ohio. The diocese declined to publicly comment on Kuenstler's commentary.) observed that the Second Vatican Council's decree Christus Dominus specifies, "The parish exists solely for the good of souls," and further specifies, "The same concern for the salvation of souls is to be the motive for determining or reconsidering the erection, suppression, or other modifications of parishes, and any other changes of this kind, which the bishop is empowered to undertake on his own authority." In canon law, both physical persons and juridic persons have "obligations and rights which correspond to their nature"; a juridic person "is perpetual by its nature"; and, a parish is a juridic person "by the law itself". So, Kuenstler believes that, "There is a strong presumption in favor of its endurance in being." She commented that this series of decrees "seemed to indicate that the Bishop of Cleveland did not consider the right of a parish to exist perpetually, nor did he consider the 'vibrancy' of existing parishes to remain open 'for the salvation of souls'."

The Congregation for Clergy combined and responded to both petitions with this single decree, the object of the recourse being against the merger/suppression of the parish and closure of the church building as ordered by Lennon.

The Congregation for Clergy stated that Lennon was advised, on several occasions, that procedures leading to the possible merger of a parish would not ipso jure enable him to perpetually close a Church to divine worship and the devotion of the faithful, and he was invited to revisit his procedure to remedy any possible invalidating defects, but he declined to do so.

The Congregation for Clergy noted that although Lennon submitted the acts of the case, and the Parish celebrated the last Mass in November 2009, Lennon did not submitted a formal canonical decree; so, the Congregation for the Clergy took the March 12, 2009 letter to the pastor, which the Congregation for Clergy also noted was co-signed by Sister Therese Guerin Sullivan, SP, JCL, (Note: Sullivan was elected a Canon Law Society of America Board of Governors Consultor in 2003. She is named as the contact person, in the Consolidation Manual, for chapters: 3, "Parish Consolidation – Canonical Implications"; 5, "Sign-off sheet for pastors of newly formed parishes resulting from a merger regarding responsibility for management of closed parish properties"; 6, "Sacred and Religious Goods"; and 10, "Parish Statistical Information".) DMin, Chancellor, as an indication of Lennon's dispositions. Canon law is explicitly cited only twice in this letter. First, to inform the pastor of the canonically set time limit to put forward a remonstration beyond which rights under canon law end; and second, to inform the pastor that parish visitations will be conducted with the intention of "continued review of progress being made in implementing the approved cluster plans."

The Congregation for Clergy pointed out that a hierarchical recourse is a documentary process which proceeds on the basis of examination of authentic documentary evidence provided by interested parties at the request of the Dicastery; thus, having provided ample opportunity for all interested parties to respond, the Dicastery judged the documentation in its possession as complete and proceeded to its decision per cartas.

The Congregation for Clergy also pointed out that canon law requires, for validity, that the diocesan bishop consult the Presbyteral Council in order to seek the advice of its members before coming to his decision regarding the suppression of a parish; and, the Congregation for Clergy noted that, a legitimate decree should be issued, stating at least in a summary fashion the lawful motivations supporting the decision, formalizing the diocesan bishop's dispositions and making them manifest to those who have interests in the matter.

The Congregation for Clergy explained that Lennon was given sufficient time to present information to solidify his decisions to the Dicastery, and to forward all of the acts pertinent in the matter to the Congregation. The absence of any decree from Lennon, indicating and formalizing his dispositions made in his March 12, 2009 letter to the pastor, troubled the judges. The Congregation for Clergy reasoned that even if the March 12, 2009 letter to the pastor was taken as a manifestation of Lennon's dispositions in the matter, which is the essence of a decree, the Congregation for Clergy clearly saw that it lacked elements required by the canons. Hence, Lennon was held to have acted in violation of the law on procedural grounds with regard to Canon 515§2.

The Congregation for Clergy wrote that Lennon's March 12, 2009 letter to the pastor omitted any specific reference to the relegation of the church to secular but not unbecoming use, or to the canonical process required by Canon 1222§2. The Congregation for Clergy reasoned that it is apparent from the acts that Lennon did in fact arrive at a decision to implement the effects of the process envisioned by Canon 1222§2 without fulfilling its procedures. Lennon's March 12, 2009 letter to the pastor is quite specific, indicating that the Church would not be used after the suppression of the Parish. In doing so, an essential element for the validity of the relegation of a church to secular but not unbecoming use was omitted, i.e., the required consultation of the Presbyteral Council regarding the matter. Lennon, even after being advised as to these shortfalls, declined to clarify the matter either by allowing the Church to remain open for divine worship and the devotion of the faithful, or by following the procedure for relegation. By the law itself, such an omission renders invalid Lennon's decision to implement the effects of Canon 1222§2, i.e., the permanent closure of St. Casimir and its concomitant relegation to secular but not unbecoming use.

The Congregation for Clergy noted that jurisprudence does not recognize such relegation to be implicit in the decree suppressing or amalgamating a parish; (Note: The Congregation for Clergy conferred Decree of the Supreme Tribunal of the Apostolic Signatura of July 1, 2010, par. 7: "Iurisprudentia Signaturae Apostolicae negat reductionem ecclesiae implicite statui posse in decreto suppressionis paroeciae." Protocol Number 38691/06 CA.) and, it was evident to the Congregation for Clergy that the requirements of canon law for the licit and valid relegation of a church to secular but not unbecoming use have not been met, and that the Church has not been lawfully and validly relegated to secular but not unbecoming use.

The Congregation for the Clergy decreed that this petition for recourse as presented, with regard to the suppression of St. Casimir Parish does have canonical basis in law and in fact, and so is upheld both de procedendo and de decernendo.

The Congregation for the Clergy further decreed that this petition for recourse as presented, with regard to the closure of St. Casimir Church does have canonical basis in law and in fact and so is upheld both de procedendo and de decernendo.

An official of the Congregation for the Clergy, Msgr. Christopher Nalty, said that while the issues in decernendo are important and also reviewed, the Holy See defers to the decisions of local bishops except in cases of obvious error or injustice; he stressed that issues in procedendo are always considered first.

The Congregation for Clergy handed down similar landmark rulings on appeals in the Diocese of Allentown and in the Diocese of Springfield. Dean emeritus and professor of law at Duquesne University School of Law in Pittsburgh, Nicholas P. Cafardi, JD, JCL, JCD, called those similar Vatican decisions a landmark. According to Cafardi, "The landmark is the recognition of the rights of the faithful in a particular church" as required by Canon 1222§2 and that it "is a substantive and not a procedural right".

Although the decrees stated both de procedendo and de decernendo in the decisions, others disagreed about the meaning of the decrees and understood them as mostly procedural. In one article, a senior fellow at Georgetown University's Woodstock Theological Center, Fr. Thomas J. Reese, SJ, said "This decision was made on procedural, not substantive or pastoral, grounds." While, a professor of canon law at The Catholic University of America, Rev. John P. Beal, JCD, wrote in the same article "It does appear that the defects identified by the Congregation are primarily procedural," and observed that, "If the findings of fact in the decrees are correct, Bishop Lennon badly botched the procedure for closing/suppressing the parishes and completely ignored the separate process for reducing the two parish churches to profane use." Beal also reasoned that "In fact, it does not appear that he [Lennon] appreciated the fact that two separate procedures with different criteria are required. In other cases, the Congregation has been extremely demanding on reducing churches to profane use and insisting on demonstrably 'grave causes'." But Borre, in the same article, believed that the Congregation for Clergy only emphasized, in an intentional manner, Lennon's "procedural flubs and the back-and-forth that they went through to try and get a nonexistent decree [from Lennon]."

In a different article, a canon lawyer at the Archdiocese of Chicago, Msgr. Patrick Lagges, JCD, said that "The Vatican seems to be reminding us that there are people involved here and people's spiritual lives."

Lennon was instructed to enact the implications of this decree.

Mark L. Movsesian, JD, Professor and Director of the Center for Law and Religion at St. John's University School of Law, saw this series of rulings as "yet another example of the growing interest in canon-law litigation in the Catholic Church' Although marriage annulments cases are common subject in canon law ecclesiastical court's docket, Movsesian opined that, "More and more, it seems, Catholics see church courts as the proper place to air their grievances and seek redress."

Lennon was informed that he could have taken recourse against the decree before the Supreme Tribunal of the Apostolic Signatura, the administrative court of the Holy See, within the 60-day time limit established in Pope Benedict XVI's motu proprio type apostolic letter Antiqua Ordinatione. He did not appeal the decree and said that "It's time for unity and peace in the Diocese of Cleveland. Therefore, I will move forward and carry out the Congregation for the Clergy's directives."

==== Reopening ====
After announcing his decision not to appeal the congregation's ruling, Lennon dissolved the Pastoral Planning Office.

In what may be described as another example of indiscrezione, on May 25, 2012, the National Catholic Reporter published an article about several priests writing to Lennon's superiors voicing their lack confidence in his leadership and requesting his removal. The article included excerpts of letters, obtained by the National Catholic Reporter with names and parishes censored, from three priests which included claims that priests feared retaliation for criticizing or questioning Lennon, claims that priests lacked confidence in Lennon's ability to lead the diocese, claims that the elimination of the Pastoral Planning Office will impact on the success of reopening parishes, and claims that Lennon is managing the reopenings in a way to guarantee the parishes' failure. The Pastoral Planning Office was described as having "the institutional memory and the competence to help for effective strategic planning" and one priest speculated that "The plan is rather to assure that no effective assistance will be available. The perception is that the closing of this office is both punitive and strategic." The article also quoted a retired priest and Writer in Residence at John Carroll University in University Heights, Ohio, Fr. Donald Cozzens, PhD, who said that letter writing is a significant development and "It takes a certain amount of moral courage for a priest to do that."

On June 15, 2012, Borre told the City Club of Cleveland that priests should publicly call on the Vatican to remove Lennon as head of the Cleveland diocese.

On June 27, 2012, Lennon announced the appointment of Father Eric Orzech as pastor of St. Casimir parish.

More than 1,000 people attended the first Mass, on July 15, 2012, in the church since it was reopened. The Catholic News Service reported that Orzech said the true test of the parish's spirit will come when a rhythm of weekly worship develops with a smaller congregation. Margaret Feckanin, who took part in the 140 weeks of vigils, said, "It's such an exciting day. I compare this day to my wedding day. It's exciting and wonderful and it's a new beginning." Telesz was remembered, pastor for the last 37 years of his 73-year ministry, for his service to the parish. Szylwian sat in the first seat of the front pew, in his Polish Army uniform with other veterans and was the first to receive the Eucharist from Lennon.

On the Feast of Christ the King, November 25, 2012, Lennon installed Orzech as pastor during the 11:30am Mass; that event marked the first time in about 40 years, since 1973, that an installation took place in the church.

== Architecture ==
On January 7, 1892, Mr. Joseph Hoffman, a Catholic, and a large property owner in that part of Cleveland, donated for church purposes a parcel of land, 200 ft (61 m) by 244 ft (74 m), bounded by Pulaski St., Kossuth (East 82nd St.), and Sowinski St.

For some years the pastor lived in a rented house. But during the summer of 1898 a frame pastoral residence was built on the church property, facing Sowinski St. It cost about $2,200.

=== Original Church ===
In a few months the handsome exterior of the building was completed. Its dimensions were: 50 ft (15 m) length, 125 ft (38 m) width, 41 ft (12 m) height; the upper story served as a church, and the lower served as a parochial school, divided into four rooms. The cost of building, exclusive of interior finish, was $16,000. As soon as the edifice was enclosed, a temporary altar was erected and plain chairs, in lieu of pews, were provided in one of the large rooms in the unplastered upper story, and divine service was held for the first time on Christmas, 1892. The parish school was opened in February, 1893, with a good attendance. Rosinski continued to attend St. Casimir's as a mission church until the appointment of Father P. M. Cerveny as first resident pastor, July 17, 1893. Under his direction, in November, 1893, only the ceilings were plastered, when part of the scaffolding collapsed, resulting in injury to some of the workmen; the work was then stopped for a time.

The dedication ceremony was performed by Horstmann on May 30, 1897, with Rosinski, founder of the parish, being the celebrant of the Solemn High Mass. George Francis Houck, then the Chancellor, wrote in 1903 that, "it was indeed a day of rejoicing for the people, whose hard earned money had been freely given towards the erection of another temple to God."

== Priests ==
This is an incomplete table of assigned Priests. Please help by expanding it.

Assigned Priests
Start	End	Name	Surname	Position
9 July 2012	--	Eric S.	Orzech	visiting Pastor
--	--	Marian	Kencik	extern priest
5 July 1973	13 November 2009	Leon	Telesz	resident Pastor
27 April 1971	5 July 1973	John J.	Bryk	Parochial Vicar
25 June 1970	5 July 1973	Leon	Telesz	Parochial Vicar
13 June 1957	14 June 1962	John J.	Bryk	Parochial Vicar
19 May 1950	15 May 1951	Leon	Telesz	Parochial Vicar
10 May 1899	--	Casimir	Lazinski	resident Pastor
1896-02-	1899-04-	Francis X.	Fremel	resident Pastor
16 September 1894	1896-02-	Sigmund	Wozny	resident Pastor
17 July 1893	16 September 1894	P. M.	Cerveny	resident Pastor
1891-12-	--	Benedict	Rosinski	mission Pastor

== See also ==
- Shrine Church of St. Stanislaus
