= St. Mary's on the Flats =

- Church of Our Lady of the Lake
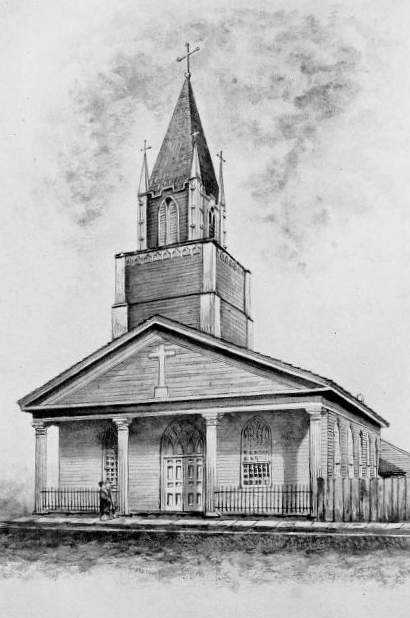
- St. Mary's on the Flats

- Site of Cleveland's first Catholic church St. Mary's on the Flats (the United States)
- 41.49002°N 81.70030°W
- Location: Cleveland, Ohio
- Country: United States
- Denomination: Roman Catholic Church

History
- Status: Parish church
- Dedication: Our Lady Of The Lake
- Dedicated: June 7, 1840

Architecture
- Functional status: Demolished
- Architect: Golden
- Architectural type: Church
- Groundbreaking: 1838
- Completed: 1840
- Construction cost: $3,000
- Closed: January 6, 1886
- Demolished: September 1888

Specifications
- Length: 81 ft (25 m)
- Width: 53 ft (16 m)
- Materials: Wood

Administration
- Province: Cincinnati
- Diocese: Cleveland

St. Mary's on the Flats, originally known as the Church of Our Lady of the Lake, was the first Catholic church building in Cleveland, Ohio. The location where the church once stood can be found, in an 1881 atlas, at the south-east corner of Columbus Ave. and then Girard Ave. on the east bank of the Cuyahoga river in the flats. Irishtown Bend Archeological District, where many of the parishioners lived, lies to the west, across the Cuyahoga river in what was Ohio City. Ohio City was annexed by Cleveland on June 5, 1854.

Malaria was common in the area the church was built, but drainage was improved during the 1830s as Cleveland evolved into a major lake shipping port. The 1830s and 1840s brought continued prosperity to the port of Cleveland, but communicable diseases such as cholera were widespread in the low-lying Flats. As a result, low cost land was available for housing the workers who walked to the jobs on the docks.

The number of Irish immigrants increased after the Great Famine, and many worked as unskilled laborers and dockworkers, and on the excavation of a new channel and mouth for the Cuyahoga River. In the 1850s, the area of Irishtown Bend was established and dominated by the winding Cuyahoga River with its swampy flood plain. Houses were primarily one or two stories and built of wood.

As the second generation of Irish families obtained better-paying work, and dock work was increasingly mechanized, the Irish began moving out of the Flats. By 1900, more than half of this area's residents were of Eastern European origin. Irishtown Bend was gradually abandoned.

== History ==
Early accounts of the parish depend on tradition and have few verifiable dates and facts. Prior to 1878, only a few parishes kept historical records and there was no uniform method or system for the keeping of historical records in the Roman Catholic Diocese of Cleveland. (Note: Unfortunately for history and the historian, prior to 1878 there was no uniform method or system in the Diocese for the keeping of historical records of parishes, missions and institutions. Only in a few parishes were they kept at all. Hence, the early accounts of most parishes and missions depend largely on tradition, and are, consequently, in many instances deficient as to dates and facts. The Diocese keeps their archive records closed; the archives have microfilmed records from some of the older parishes throughout the Diocese and Sacramental Records for the city of Cleveland from the early 1840s.)

On June 19, 1821, the Diocese of Cincinnati was erected by Pope Pius VII from territory, including the entire state of Ohio, taken from the former Diocese of Bardstown. During this period, diocesan priests began to replace visiting missionaries; Dominican priests (1817–1842), Redemptorist priests (1834–1842), and Sanguinist priests (1844– ?).

The parish was organized in 1826 by Catholic immigrant laborers, mostly Irish and a small number of German and Dutch; many of them worked digging the Ohio and Erie Canal which, by 1827, connected Lake Erie to Akron. The parish met in the Masonic Hall, Shakespeare Hall, and Mechanics Hall. That same year, 1826, Erie Street Cemetery opened and all bodies, including early Catholics, were removed from Cleveland's original burial ground, at the intersection of Ontario Ave. and Prospect Ave., to the new location. The West Side Cemetery, now known as Monroe Street Cemetery, had its first burial in 1818. There was no Catholic cemetery.

The 1830 census showed the population of Cleveland had increased to only about 1075.

Bishop John Purcell, of Cincinnati, visited Cleveland in 1835; Rev. John Dillon (Note: Dillon, Rev. John, was born in Drumcunny, County Leitrim, Ireland, 1807;) was the first resident pastor of Cleveland from 1835 to 1836; the congregation consisted of not more than three hundred. Rev. Stephen Badin (Note: Badin, V. Rev. Stephen Theodore, the first priest ordained in the United States, was born July 27, 1768, in Orléans, France; ordained, May 25, 1793, in the Archdiocese of Baltimore by Archbishop Carroll. He did pastoral assignments at Canton, Canal Fulton, Cleveland, Fremont and Tiffin, between 1835 and 1837.) was a visiting priest.

Rev. Patrick O'Dwyer (Note: O'Dwyer, Rev. Patrick, was born in Cashel, Ireland; ordained 1829, in Quebec.) was second resident pastor from 1837 to 1839 (1836–1838), and broke ground for this church in 1838. It was sited in a central location, where Catholics could gather from both Cleveland and Ohio City, about 500 ft (150 m) from the Columbus Street Bridge, the first permanent bridge across the Cuyahoga river which opened three years earlier. The church was also about 2,100 ft (640 m) from the lock between Lake Erie and the Ohio and Erie Canal.

Rev. Peter McLaughlin (Note: McLaughlin, Rev. Peter, was born in Ireland, 1805; ordained in 1840, in the Diocese of Cincinnati, by Bishop Purcell.) was the third resident pastor in Cleveland from 1840 to 1846. Shortly after his arrival, he had the interior completed. When St. Mary's on the Flats was dedicated, within the limits of the Diocese of Cleveland there were only two other churches: St. Paul's, now St. Philip Neri's, near Dungannon, Columbiana County, known as the birthplace of Catholicism in Northern Ohio; and, St. John's in Canton, Stark County.; both are now in the Diocese of Youngstown By this time, Cleveland was the 67th largest city in the United States, according to data compiled from the 1840 census, with a population of 6,071.

June 7, 1840, the Church of Our Lady of the Lake, known later as St. Mary's on the "Flats", was dedicated by French Bishop Count Charles Auguste Marie Joseph de Forbin-Janson of Nancy, during his missionary tour through the United States, and witnessed by Bishop John Purcell, of Cincinnati. Monsignor George Francis Houck, Chancellor of the Diocese of Cleveland, quoted an article, from the June 20, 1840, issue of The Catholic Telegraph, describing the event:

Rt. Rev. Dr. de Forbin-Janson, Bishop of Nancy and Toul, France, and Bishop Purcell, of Cincinnati left Buffalo on the Steamboat Constitution at 8p.m. on Friday, 5th of June, for Cleveland. At Fairport, 30 miles from the last mentioned place, they were overtaken by a violent storm, during which the vessel, which was very heavily laden, labored a great deal and made but little headway, so that they did not reach their destination for many hours after the usual time employed in making the trip. They were both, as were nearly all of their fellow-travelers, gloriously sea-sick and soaked with surf from the swollen waters, and the good Bishop of Nancy was moreover at one moment in imminent danger of serious injury from the falling of a high and heavy pile of cases of merchandise in a sudden lurch of the ship. Finally they disembarked in safety, at 5a.m., on Sunday morning, Auspice Maria.

The Bishop of the diocese was agreeably surprised to find that all the work which he had directed to be done at the new church by Mr. Golden, the architect, had been not only faithfully performed, but that the altar and the plastering, etc., had likewise been very neatly executed. He accordingly resolved not to lose so favorable an occasion of dedicating it. The zealous Bishop of Nancy, who seems to have never known what it is to be weary in well doing, kindly consented to dedicate the church, which he did according to the Roman ritual, and in full pontificals, after which he celebrated High Mass, which was wonderfully well sung in plain chant by the choir. * * Bishop Purcell preached to a very intelligent and attentive auditory, before and after the ceremony. The church measures 81 by 53 feet, having four well wrought Doric columns in front, a light but substantial gallery, or organ loft, handsome ceiling, etc., and conveniently situated on Columbus St., between the two [?] congregations of Cleveland and Ohio City [?].

Before other churches were built, many parishioners walked from far distances. Farmers, and others having horse-drawn vehicles, rode from Euclid and Collinwood, to the east; from Dover and Rockport, to the west; and from more distant points; over bad roads.

A Father Mathew Society, was organized by Rev. McLaughlin, on the March 12, 1841; the first total abstinence society in Cleveland; it had a membership of 163. In August 1851, Rev. Mathew visited Cleveland, it is not known if he visited this church.

The earliest known case of local sacrilege took place on July 7, 1845, when burglars stole a chalice, a ciborium, a monstrance, and two sets of candelabra after taking down and disassembling the tabernacle.

Rev. Maurice Howard (Note: Howard, Rev. Maurice, was born January 4, 1813, in Effin, County Limerick, Ireland; completed ecclesiastical studies in the United States; ordained October 23, 1842, in the Diocese of Cincinnati, by Bishop Purcell.) was pastor since 1846.

On April 23, 1847, the Diocese of Cleveland was erected by Pope Pius IX from territory taken from the Diocese of Cincinnati. Until the Cathedral of St. John was completed in 1852, St. Mary's on the Flats served as the cathedral of Bishop Louis Amadeus Rappe. On October 23, 1848, on a lot immediately east of the present Cathedral, a temporary frame structure was erected, known as the Church of the Nativity, and served as a chapel of ease to St. Mary's on the Flats, until the completion of the Cathedral of St. John. The Catholic population, quoted by Houck from a March 16, 1848, article in the Cleveland Herald, was about 4,000. By this time, according to data compiled from the 1850 census, Cleveland's population of 17,034 was the 41st in the United States.

In January 1848, Rev. Louis de Goesbriand (Note: de Goesbriand, Rt. Rev. Louis, was born August 4, 1816, in Saint-Urbain, Finistère, France; completed ecclesiastical studies at Saint-Sulpice, Paris; ordained July 13, 1840, in Paris by Bishop Rosati of St. Louis.) succeeded Rev. Howard in the pastorate of St. Mary's, and was also appointed Vicar General to Bishop Rappe, retaining the latter position till his consecration as Bishop of Burlington, in October 1853. Father de Goesbriand was assisted during the time of his pastorate by Rev. James Conlan, (Note: Conlan, V. Rev. James, was born August 22, 1801, in Mohill, County Leitrim, Ireland;) and occasionally by Sanguinist priests.

From 1826 to 1849 the Catholics buried their dead in Erie Street Cemetery; until, on January 22, 1849, Bishop Rappe purchased 15 acres (6 ha) on Woodland Ave. and the first burial in St. Joseph's Cemetery was done in 1850.

English was not the only language in which Catholics wanted to hear homiletics delivered. On November 7, 1852, St. Mary's was assigned to German speakers who were placed under the pastoral care of Sanguinist priests and Rev. Nicholas Roupp, (Note: Roupp, Rev. Nicholas, was born April 25, 1825, in Puttelange, Moselle; completed ecclesiastical studies in Metz and Cleveland; ordained August 15, 1849, in the Diocese of Cleveland by Bishop Rappe. He left the diocese in June 1864.) till the advent of Rev. John H. Luhr, (Note: Luhr, V. Rev. John Henry, was born April 21, 1808, in Steinfeld, Duchy of Oldenburg; ordained September 21, 1831.) February 1853.

For their pastoral care, German speakers west of the river, organized under the patronage of St. Mary of the Assumption, were given the use of the church from November 1854 to 1865 Their parish church was built at the intersection of Jersey St. and Carroll St. Rev. J. J. Kramer, (Note: Kramer, Rev. J. J., was born in Alsace; completed ecclesiastical studies in Alsace; ordained in Alsace.) Rev. F. X. Obermueller, (Note: Obermueller, Rev. Francis Xavier, was born October 6, 1810, in Schwarzenberg, Austrian Empire; educated in the diocese of Metz and diocese of Cleveland; ordained December 11, 1853, in the Diocese of Cleveland by Bishop Rappe.) and Rev. James Hamene (Note: Hamene, Rev. James, was born, 1825, in Chémery-les-Deux, Lorraine;) had successive charge of St. Mary's congregation.

For their pastoral care, German speakers east of the river, organized under the patronage of St. Peter, were given the use of the church from November 7, 1852, until fall of 1854; Their parish church, St. Peter Church, stands at the intersection of Superior St. and E. 17th St.

For their pastoral care, English speakers west of the river, organized under the patronage of St. Patrick in 1853, were given the use of the church in 1854; Their parish church was built on Whitman St. on November 27, 1857.

Cleveland was the 21st largest city, according to data compiled from the 1860 census, with a population of 43,417.

For their pastoral care, English speakers west of the river, out of the eastern section of St. Patrick parish, organized under the patronage of St. Malachy, were given the use of the church from November 1865 to December 1868; Rev. James P. Molony, was appointed first pastor.

For their pastoral care, Czech speakers, organized under the patronage of St. Wenceslas, were given the use of the church in 1867. Prior to that time the Czechs had separate services in St. Peter's and St. Joseph's. Their parish church once stood on Arch St. (E. 35th Place) near Woodland Ave.

By the 1870 census, Cleveland was the 15th largest city, with a population of 92,829. It also had one of the largest Catholic populations in the United States.

For their pastoral care, French and English speakers, organized under the patronage of the Annunciation, were given the use of the church in 1870; Their parish church, Annunciation Church, once stood at the intersection of Hurd St. and Moore St. (now part of the West Side Market parking lot).

For their pastoral care, Polish speakers, organized under the patronage of St. Stanislaus, were given the use of the church from 1872 to January 1879,

Rev. Victor Zareczny, (Note: Zareczny, Rev. Victor, was born December 3, 1841, in Lviv then known as Lemberg, Galicia, Austria; ordained July 21, 1868, in Galicia. He left the diocese in February 1884.) pastor of St. Adalbert, in Berea, visited from December 1873 until October 1877,

Rev. John A. Marschal (Note: Marschal, Rev. John A., was born in Olsztyn, then known as Allenstein, Kingdom of Prussia, 1819;) was appointed their first resident pastor. This position he held until January 1879, when he left the diocese.

Polish were the last to occupy the proto-cathedral of Cleveland, (Note: An 1877 perspective map, by illustrator Albert Ruger, although not drawn to scale, shows the church as "19" and the map's legend lists the corresponding represented feature as "19. St. Mary's Church, Polish, Roman Catholic.") In January 1879, Rev. Wolfgang Janietz, (Note: Janietz, Rev. Wolfgang (Franciscan), was born November 27, 1832, in Baldwinowice, then known as Belmsdorf, Silesia;) O.F.M., succeeded Father Marschal; by this time St. Mary's Church on the Flats was unfit for use, and the Poles began to use the Franciscan Monastery Chapel, on Hazen St. Their parish church, the Shrine Church of St. Stanislaus, stands at the intersection of Forman Ave. and Tod St. (E. 65th St.).

On December 28, 1878, the Superior Avenue Viaduct, spanning the Cuyahoga river valley, opened; in 1879, the old church in the valley was practically abandoned. By then, Cleveland was the 11th largest city, according to data compiled from the 1880 census, with a population of 160,146. Years later, the church was deconsecrated, Houck described the last mass in the church:

On the Feast of Epiphany, January 6, 1886, Bishop Gilmour directed his Vicar General, the Rt. Rev. Mgr. Boff, to celebrate High Mass in it — the last divine service within its hallowed walls. It was a typical winter's day, with plenty of snow and ice covering the interior of the building, open for long to wind and weather. Two years previous a ruthless storm had blown down its much decayed spire, and the cold blasts had full sway in the church through broken roof and almost paneless windows. The forlorn looking edifice was packed to overflowing with an interested audience, composed largely of the old Catholic settlers of Cleveland, who had worshipped within its sacred walls in earlier years, when they were in the prime of life and the church attractive in appearance. The old mother church of Cleveland's Catholics then looked tattered and torn, while her daughters, decked in splendor, were carrying on high in every part of the city, the Sign of Redemption on lofty tower or graceful spire.

Bishop Richard Gilmour had the church torn down in September 1888.

Within two years after the demolition of the church, 1890 census data showed Cleveland was the 10th largest city, with a population of 261,353. The place where the church stood, formerly known as "Cleveland centre", was completely changed into an industrial area.

== Architecture ==
The exterior design, as shown in a drawing, is not immediately identifiable as a Catholic church but more symbolic of a New England Protestant church; within the norms of Cleveland at that time, described as "trinitarian congregationalism in religion, democracy in government", when nativist anti-Catholic bigotry flourished.

The church building was a rectangular single-story structure with a gallery for a church organ. It had little exterior ornamentation. The facade, a simplified Greek Revival reproduction of the classical Doric order, was supported by four doric columns. The first floor exterior of the front elevation was symmetrically designed with a central pair of doors, beneath a transomed multi-paned arched-window, surrounded by one multi-paned arched-window on each side. A pedimented gable was surrounded by simple moulding enclosing a tympanum decorated with a Latin cross in relief. A square tower supporting a Gothic Revival steeple at the front dominated the church's facade.

== See also ==
- List of Catholic cathedrals in the United States
- List of cathedrals in the United States
