= Sacred Heart of Jesus Church (Cleveland) =

Sacred Heart of Jesus
- Location within Cleveland
- 41.4412°N 81.6399°W
- Location: Cleveland, Ohio
- Country: United States
- Denomination: Roman Catholic Church

History
- Status: Parish church
- Founder: Anton Francis Kolaszewski
- Dedication: Sacred Heart of Jesus

Architecture
- Functional status: Closed
- Architect: J. Ellsworth Potter
- Architectural type: Church
- Completed: 1951
- Closed: 2 May 2010

Administration
- Province: Cincinnati
- Diocese: Cleveland

Sacred Heart of Jesus (Polish: Parafia pw. Najswietszego Serca Pana Jezusa w Cleveland), was a Catholic parish church in Cleveland, Ohio and part of the Roman Catholic Diocese of Cleveland. It was located at the north-west corner of intersection of East 71st St. and Kazimier St., in a part of the South Broadway neighborhood previously known in Polish as na Krakowie and nicknamed Goosetown.

Both the church building and the school building are GNIS named features. The church, school, and rectory buildings are listed together as a Cleveland Designated Landmark.

The church was closed 2 May 2010.

== History ==
Between 1885 and 1889 a large number of Poles settled in South Cleveland, in the area of East 71st St. and Harvard Ave. They lived too far away from St. Stanislaus church for them to conveniently either attend Mass or for their children to attend the parish school. (Note: Using Google Maps, the walking distance between the Shrine Church of St. Stanislaus and the closed Sacred Heart of Jesus church is over 1.5 mi (2.4 km).) They petitioned Bishop Richard Gilmour for permission to form a new parish and build a church for their own use.

=== Founding ===
The petition to form a new parish and build a church was granted, and the parish was founded in 1889—about 42 years after the Diocese of Cleveland was erected by Pope Pius IX.

=== 19th century ===
Father Anton Francis Kolaszewski, the pastor of St. Stanislaus', was authorized to secure a church site, which he did in the summer of 1889, although the deed was given a few months later—15 October 1889. The property, 315 ft (96 m) by 259 ft (79 m), was secured at a cost of $2,500. It was located at the corner of East 71st St. and Kraków St. Shortly after the property was secured, a combination frame church and school was begun, the cornerstone for which was laid on Sunday, 29 September 1889, by Monsignor Felix M. Boff, V.G. In December of the same year the church was used for the first time. It was dedicated on Sunday, 2 June 1890, by Boff, who also blessed the church bell on the same day. The church, with pews, altars, etc., cost about $15,000. The upper story is used for divine worship and the lower story serves as a parochial school, divided into three rooms. The school was attended by two hundred pupils, taught by Felician Sisters, of Detroit, who have had charge since its opening, in the spring of 1890. The church was attended from St. Stanislaus' as a mission until the appointment of Father M. F. Orzechowski as first resident pastor, 6 August 1891. During that year a pastoral residence was built at a cost of about $2,000, and in 1892 a fence was put around the entire property. Orzechowski left in July, 1893. The parish was attended from St. Stanislaus' Church until 22 December 1893, when Father James Kula was appointed. Kula became discouraged, owing to the parish debt, and a want of correspondence with his well-intended efforts on the part of some of his parishioners. Kula left 10 July 1895, and was immediately succeeded by Father Paul Cwiakala, who in a very short time gained the love and confidence of his people. During 1896 an organ and an elegant baptismal font were secured—the former the gift of a church society, the latter donated by a parishioner. The pews were also repainted and a good supply of church vestments, etc., was bought. As Cwiakala's health was failing, Bishop Ignatius Frederick Horstmann permitted him to go to Europe for three months—July to September, 1896, during which time his place was supplied by Father L. Kisielewiecz, a professor in the Polish seminary at Detroit. On his return from Europe, Cwiakala reassumed pastoral charge of the parish. For nearly three years—till July, 1899—he labored faithfully and zealously for the best interests of the people, and in consequence overtaxed his strength. Again he was obliged to ask for a period of rest, to recuperate. He was granted a leave of absence, and left for Europe and Rome in July, 1899.

=== 20th century ===
Father Francis Wegrsznowski was given temporary charge of the parish, and in July, 1900, was succeeded by Father Victor Szyrocki. In 1903, the parish was in excellent condition. George Francis Houck, then the Chancellor, wrote in 1903 that, "its members are entirely of the laboring class, they contribute generously of their earnings to the support of church and school".

== Architecture ==
The property, 315 ft (96 m) by 259 ft (79 m), was secured at a cost of $2,500.

=== Original church ===
Shortly after the property was secured, a combination frame church and school was begun, the cornerstone for which was laid on Sunday, 29 September 1889, by Mgr. Felix M. Boff, V. G.; in December of the same year the church was used for the first time. It was dedicated on Sunday, 2 June 1890, by Boff, who also blessed the church bell on the same day. The church, with pews, altars, etc., cost about $15,000. The upper story was used for divine worship and the lower story served as a parochial school, divided into three rooms.

== Records ==
The records of this church, and all churches closed after 1975, can be found in the Catholic Diocese of Cleveland Archives. Diocesan policy is to keep all archive records closed.

== See also ==
- Shrine Church of St. Stanislaus
