= Tyler O'Connor =

American football player (born 1994)

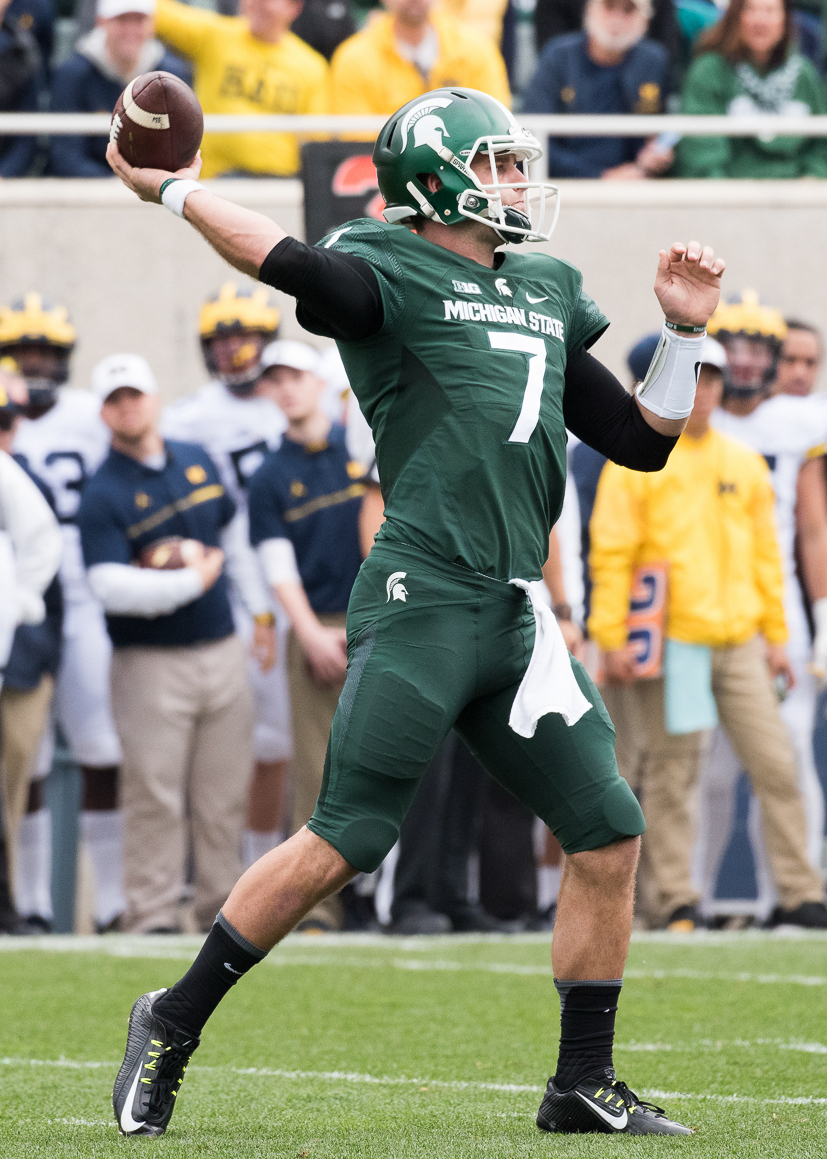
- O'Connor in 2016

No. 7
- Position: Quarterback

Personal information
- Born: March 4, 1994 (age 32)
- Listed height: 6 ft 1 in (1.85 m)
- Listed weight: 210 lb (95 kg)

Career information
- High school: Lima Central Catholic (Lima, Ohio)
- College: Michigan State (2012–2016)
- Stats at ESPN

Tyler O'Connor (born March 4, 1994) is an American former college football quarterback who played for the Michigan State Spartans.

== Early life ==
O'Connor attended Lima Central Catholic High School in Lima, Ohio. As a senior, he threw for 1,995 yards and 18 touchdowns. Following his high school career, O'Connor committed to play college football at Michigan State University.

== College career ==
O'Connor redshirted in 2012 and served as the backup quarterback for three seasons, playing sparingly. He made his first career start against No. 3 Ohio State in 2015 following an injury to Connor Cook, completing seven passes for 89 yards and a touchdown, leading the Spartans to a 17–14 victory. O'Connor competed for the Spartans' starting quarterback position entering his redshirt senior season in 2016. He was eventually named the team's starting quarterback prior to the season opener against Furman. In the game, O'Connor threw for 190 yards and three touchdowns in the 28–13 win. Against No. 11 Wisconsin, he struggled, throwing three interceptions in a 6–30 loss. O'Connor finished his final season throwing for 1,970 yards with 16 touchdowns and nine interceptions, being sacked 21 times.

=== Statistics ===
Season	Team	Games			Passing								Rushing			
Season	Team	GP	GS	Record	Cmp	Att	Pct	Yds	Avg	TD	Int	Rtg	Att	Yds	Avg	TD
2012	Michigan State	Redshirted (redshirt)														
2013	Michigan State	3	0	0–0	9	14	64.3	90	6.4	0	0	118.3	8	24	3.0	0
2014	Michigan State	5	0	0–0	12	16	75.0	151	9.4	2	1	183.0	6	22	3.7	2
2015	Michigan State	6	1	1–0	13	24	54.2	133	5.5	2	1	119.9	14	48	5.2	0
2016	Michigan State	11	9	3–6	154	262	58.8	1,970	7.5	16	9	135.2	63	70	1.1	0
Career		25	10	4−6	188	316	59.5	2,344	7.4	20	11	135.7	91	164	1.8	2

== Professional career ==
After going undrafted in the 2017 NFL draft, O'Connor tried out with the Cincinnati Bengals. After not being extended a contract offer, he retired from football.
