= Annunciation Church (Cleveland) =

- Church of St. Mary of the Annunciation
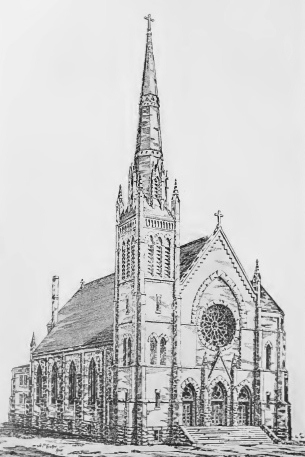

- Location within Ohio
- 41.486°N 81.701°W
- Location: Cleveland, Ohio
- Country: United States
- Denomination: Roman Catholic Church

History
- Status: Parish church
- Founded: 1870
- Dedication: St. Mary of the Annunciation
- Dedicated: 25 September 1898

Architecture
- Functional status: Demolished
- Architectural type: Church
- Style: French Gothic Revival
- Groundbreaking: 12 July 1896

Administration
- Province: Cincinnati
- Diocese: Cleveland

Annunciation Church (French: Église de l'Annonciation de Cleveland), was a Catholic parish church in Cleveland, Ohio and part of the Diocese of Cleveland. It was located at the intersection of Hurd St. and Moore St., now part of the West Side Market parking lot, in the Ohio City neighborhood. The location where the church once stood can be found, in an 1881 atlas, at the south-west corner of Hurd St. and Moore St., on the west bank of the Cuyahoga River above part of the Flats historically known as Ox Bow Bend. It was located about 1,560 ft (480 m) walking distance from St. Mary's on the Flats, the first Catholic church in Cleveland and about 150 ft (46 m) distance from the present St. Emeric Church.

== History ==
=== Founding ===
The parish was founded 1870 – about 23 years after the Diocese of Cleveland was erected by Pope Pius IX.

=== 19th century ===
George Francis Houck, Chancellor of the Diocese of Cleveland, wrote that, the Catholic French population, unlike the Catholics of other nationalities in Cleveland, was neither large enough nor closely grouped, to form an exclusively French language parish, but lived scattered throughout the city and attended a church nearest to them. But, they were deprived of the advantages of sermons and instructions in French. Bishop Louis Amadeus Rappe, full of zeal for the spiritual welfare of all his flock, resolved to organize a French national parish and bring them together as best he could. A lot was purchased at the corner of Hurd St. and Moore St., on 7 August 1868. It was paid for, about 1870, through the efforts of the Rev. Augustine Grandmougin, pastor of St. Augustine Church, Cleveland. Two years after the purchase of the lot Father Andrew Sauvadet was appointed pastor of all the French people of Cleveland, and under his direction a plain but commodious frame church was built, which was opened for divine service for the first time on the third Sunday of October 1870, and placed under the patronage of St. Mary of the Annunciation. The upper portion of the building was used as a church, and the lower story was divided into a two classroom parochial school.

As the number of French people identifying themselves with Annunciation Church was not, and never was, sufficient to meet the expenses connected with the support of the church and the school, a portion of St. Patrick's congregation was added, thus making Annunciation Church about two-thirds English language and one-third French language.

From the beginning, Annunciation Church had been burdened with a heavy debt, incurred in building the church, and for the purchase of several additional lots and residences for the pastor, and for the Sisters of the Holy Humility of Mary, who have had charge of the parochial school since it was opened, in 1872.

Father Augustine Gerardin, received his appointment in April 1878. He set to work at once to pay off the debt, at that time about $10,000. This was by no means an easy task, as with the financial depression, then still existing, and the poverty of many of his people, he had hard work to meet even the current expenses of the parish. However, the debt was gradually diminished, and fully paid in 1888. By this time the need of a more substantial church, to replace the frame edifice, became almost imperative. Gerardin succeeded in putting aside from the annual parish income a fair sum to serve as the nucleus for a building fund. As the site for the proposed new church had to be located next to the old edifice, and on the lot covered by the pastoral residence, Gerardin purchased, on 19 March 1892, a lot in the rear of the frame church, fronting on Moore street. The brick house on the lot he had fitted up as a pastoral residence, his former residence having been given in exchange for the excavation made for the new church. In May 1896, with $11,000 in the parish treasury, work was begun on the new brick church. In order not to overtax his people, and to reduce the debt already incurred, Gerardin postponed the completion of the church until 1898. At an expense of nearly $11,000 he then had the entire church finished, including frescoing, pews, three beautiful altars, stained glass windows, making it one of the neatest and most attractive churches in the diocese. On Sunday, 25 September 1898, it was solemnly dedicated by Bishop Ignatius Frederick Horstmann. It was a day of great joy for the pastor, and for his people, whose generosity made it possible to build the beautiful church. The debt ($8,000) as compared with the property owned by the congregation, is insignificant, and will be cancelled in a very few years. In fact, most of the debt would have been paid by the end of the year 1900, had not the pastor been obliged to relinquish all duty for nearly one year, owing to serious illness. During Gerardin's absence in Europe, for the benefit of his impaired health, the Rev. L. J. Wickart, of the Roman Catholic Archdiocese of Detroit, had charge of the parish, from September 1899, till 1 May 1900.

== Architecture ==
=== First church ===
A plain but commodious frame church was built. The upper portion of the building was used as a church, and the lower story was divided into a two classroom parochial school.

=== Second church ===
The cornerstone was laid by Horstmann on 12 July 1896. The church, which is of French Gothic architecture, was brought under roof the same year.

On Sunday, 25 September 1898, it was solemnly dedicated by Bishop Ignatius Frederick Horstmann.
