= Shrine Church of St. Stanislaus =

Historic church in Ohio, United States

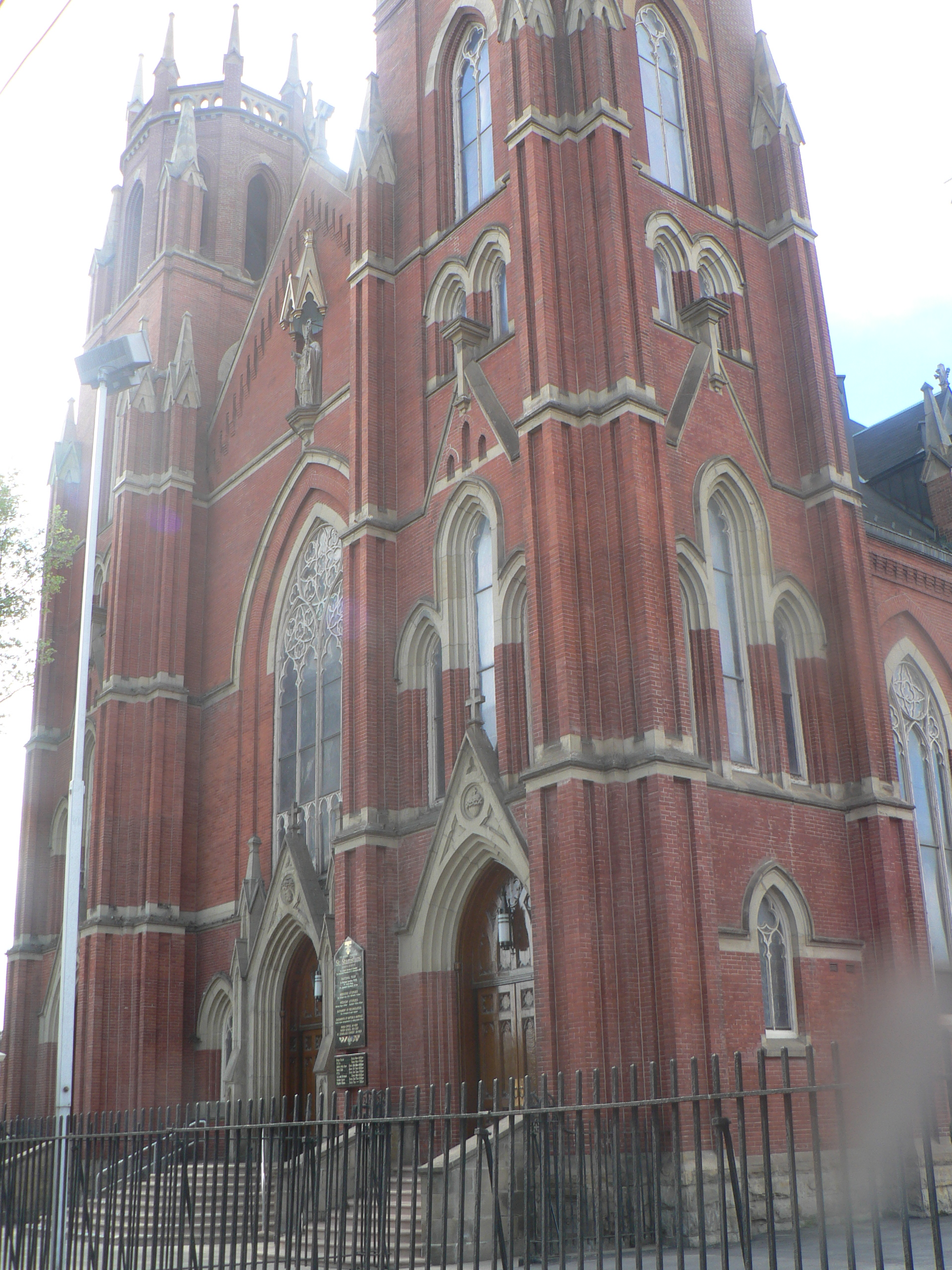

- Location within Ohio
- 41.458800°N 81.644575°W
- Location: Cleveland, Ohio
- Country: United States
- Denomination: Roman Catholic Church
- Website: www.ststanislaus.org

History
- Status: Parish church
- Dedication: St. Stanislaus of Szczepanów
- Dedicated: November 15, 1891
- Consecrated: -->True Cross, St. Anthony, St. Bonaventure, St. Clare, St. Francis, St. Gemma, St. George, St. Gerard, St. Ignatius of Loyola, St. Ivan, St. James, St. John Vianney, St. Joseph of Leonessa, St. Julian, St. Lawrence, St. Louis, St. Nicasius, St. Pius X, St. Sebastian, St. Theodosius, St. Thérèse of Lisieux, mitre of Pope John Paul II

Architecture
- Functional status: Active
- Architectural type: Church
- Style: Gothic; Polish Cathedral style
- Groundbreaking: 1886
- Completed: 1891
- Construction cost: $150,000

Specifications
- Length: 200 ft (61 m)
- Width: 85 ft (26 m)
- Materials: Locally made warm red brick and dressed stone.

Administration
- Province: Cincinnati
- Diocese: Cleveland

Clergy
- Pastor: Rev. Fr. Eric Orzech
- St. Stanislaus Church
- U.S. National Register of Historic Places
- Built: 1886–1891
- Architect: William H. Dunn
- Restored: 1998–2004
- Part of: Warszawa Neighborhood District (ID80002980)
- NRHP reference No.: 76001404
- Added to NRHP: 1976-06-22

The Shrine Church of St. Stanislaus (Polish: Kościół św. Stanisława Biskupa i Męczennika) is the home of a Catholic parish within the Diocese of Cleveland. St. Stanislaus is one of the major historic centers of Polish life in Cleveland, Ohio, especially for Poles with roots in Warsaw and surrounding areas, and is often called the mother church for Cleveland's Polish population. The shrine is located at the intersection of Forman Ave. and East 65th St., in a part of the South Broadway neighborhood previously known as Warszawa; today the area is known as Slavic Village. The church, the neighborhood, and the larger surroundings are GNIS named features.

The building itself, listed as St. Stanislaus Church, and the neighborhood, listed as Warszawa Neighborhood District, are both on the National Register of Historic Places.

The church and school buildings are listed together as a Cleveland Designated Landmark.

The Alliance of Poles on Broadway Avenue was allied with the St. Stanislaus Parish Community.

== History ==
The year 1868 marks the beginning of the Catholic Polish immigration to Cleveland. It was then that a few families of Poles settled in the "Forest City". By the end of 1873 their number had increased so much that Bishop Richard Gilmour found it necessary to organize them into a separate congregation. As they were too poor, and too few in number, to build their own church, Gilmour gave them the use of St. Mary's on the Flats. George Francis Houck wrote that Catholic Poles of Cleveland were the last to occupy St. Mary's on the Flats, the first Catholic church building in Cleveland, from 1872 to 1879, before organizing as the St. Stanislaus congregation. Poles were the last to occupy the proto-cathedral of Cleveland. (Note: An 1877 perspective map, by illustrator Albert Ruger, although not drawn to scale, shows the church as "19" and the map's legend lists the corresponding represented feature as "19. St. Mary's Church, Polish, Roman Catholic.")

=== Founding ===
The Congregation was founded 1873—about 25 years after the Diocese of Cleveland was erected by Pope Pius IX and about eight years before they obtained the current property.

For the pastoral care of Polish language speakers, Gilmour commissioned Father Victor Zareczny, born in Lwów then known as Lemberg, Galicia, pastor of St. Adalbert's Polish Church, in Berea, Ohio, to look after their spiritual interests, which he did from December, 1873, until October, 1877, when Father John A. Marschal, born in Olsztyn, then known as Allenstein, Kingdom of Prussia, was appointed the first resident pastor for Poles. This position he held until January, 1879, when he left the diocese.

The ties between the Order of Friars Minor and the congregation began in 1879 when Father Wolfgang Janietz, OFM, succeeded Father Marschal. Janietz was born November 27, 1832, in Baldwinowice, then known as Belmsdorf, Silesia;

By this time St. Mary's on the Flats was unfit for use, and Janietz obtained the use of the Franciscan Monastery Chapel, on Hazen St., for the Poles. In 1879 St. Mary's on the Flats was practically abandoned.

=== 19th Century ===
In August, 1881, the present site was purchased, where most of the Poles had settled, near to the Cleveland Rolling Mills, which was located near present-day Jones Rd. and Broadway Ave., where many of them had found employment.

Janietz attended, from the Franciscan Monastery, until August, 1883.

Anton Francis Kolaszewski received Holy Orders on July 1, 1883, from Gilmour. His first assignment as a priest, a few weeks after his ordination, was as the first resident pastor of St. Stanislaus Church, replacing Janietz.

In 1883, the parish numbered about 200 families.

A parish school was opened simultaneously with the original church, and had been under the care of Sisters of St. Francis. The attendance, in 1903, was about 1,000 pupils.

Houck wrote that between 1886 and 1890, frequent charges were made against Kolaszewski. Houck, who was both Episcopal Secretary to Gilmour and Chancellor of the diocese at the time of the allegations, did not explicitly state what these charges were; the unspecified charges were vaguely described as grave.

Houck wrote that the investigation of these charges, and the bitter partisanship for and against Kolaszewski, among the parishioners, caused Gilmour and the Diocesan curia a great deal of trouble. Houck described neither the investigation of the unspecified allegations nor the trouble.

Between 1885 and 1889 a large number of Poles settled in the southern part of Cleveland, in the area of East 71st St. and Harvard Ave. They lived too far away from St. Stanislaus Church for them to conveniently either attend Mass or for their children to attend the parish school. (Note: Using Google Maps, the walking distance between the Shrine Church of St. Stanislaus and the closed Sacred Heart of Jesus church is over 1.5 mi (2.4 km).) Those parishioners petitioned Gilmour for permission to form a new parish and build a church for their own use. Those parishioners left to form Sacred Heart of Jesus Church in 1889.

To provide properly for the large and steadily increasing number of Poles in the north-eastern part of Cleveland it was found necessary to organize them into a parish, separate from St. Stanislaus Church, with which they had been affiliated, thus forming the third Polish congregation within the limits of the city. In December, 1891, Monsignor Felix Boff, administrator of the diocese, granted the required permission. Those parishioners left to form St. Casimir Church in 1891.

Within two months after Bishop Ignatius Frederick Horstmann came to the diocese, another grave charge was made against Kolaszewski. He was unable to disprove it, and so, on May 28, 1892, offered his resignation.

His resignation was accepted by Horstmann, on condition that he leave the diocese, which he did. He went to Syracuse, New York, where he passed under the name of "Father Colly". Kolaszewski remained in Syracuse for about two years.

After he left Cleveland it was found that St. Stanislaus Church had a debt of over $90,000, about half of which was unauthorized by either Gilmour or Horstmann.

Father Benedict Rosinski succeeded Kolaszewski in June, 1892, and soon found that he had to face a debt of a little over $100,000—far beyond what he and his congregation supposed it to be. The actual debt had also been kept from the knowledge of the Bishop. Rosinski felt the great weight of his burden, but trusting to the well known and much tried generosity of his people he set to work to gradually reduce the great debt.

Kolaszewski remained in Syracuse until May, 1894 when he returned to Cleveland and organized a group of his followers from St. Stanislaus parish. Those parishioners left to form, an independent schismatic congregation, under the name of Immaculate Heart of the Blessed Virgin Mary in 1894. He was censured with latae sententiae excommunication, with remission of his censure reserved to the Holy See. Their parish was admitted into the Roman Catholic Diocese of Cleveland, on September 15, 1908.

=== Twentieth century ===
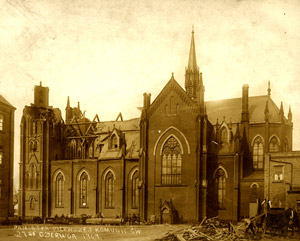
St. Stanislaus after tornado in 1909

A tornado on April 21, 1909 destroyed the twin spires at the front of the church. They were rebuilt within the year. Saint Stanislaus original height was 232 ft (71 m) but currently is 122 ft (37 m).

In 1962, St. Stanislaus built a new parish social center and gym complex across the street. In 1968, Cleveland Central Catholic High School was established at St. Stanislaus Parish. Cleveland Central Catholic and St. Stanislaus School have Masses in the church. In 1969 Cardinal Karol Wojtyła (the future Pope John Paul II) visited the parish.

On June 22, 1976, it was added to the National Register of Historic Places.

=== 21st century ===
In 2002 the pastor, Father William Gulas, OFM, was killed by Brother Daniel Montgomery, OFM, and to hide the crime Montgomery set the parish friary and offices on fire. Montgomery later admitted to the crime and was sentenced to life in jail in 2005. Father William was succeeded by Father Michael Surufka OFM. Surufka formed the Franciscan Development Corporation to help develop new residences in the neighborhood.

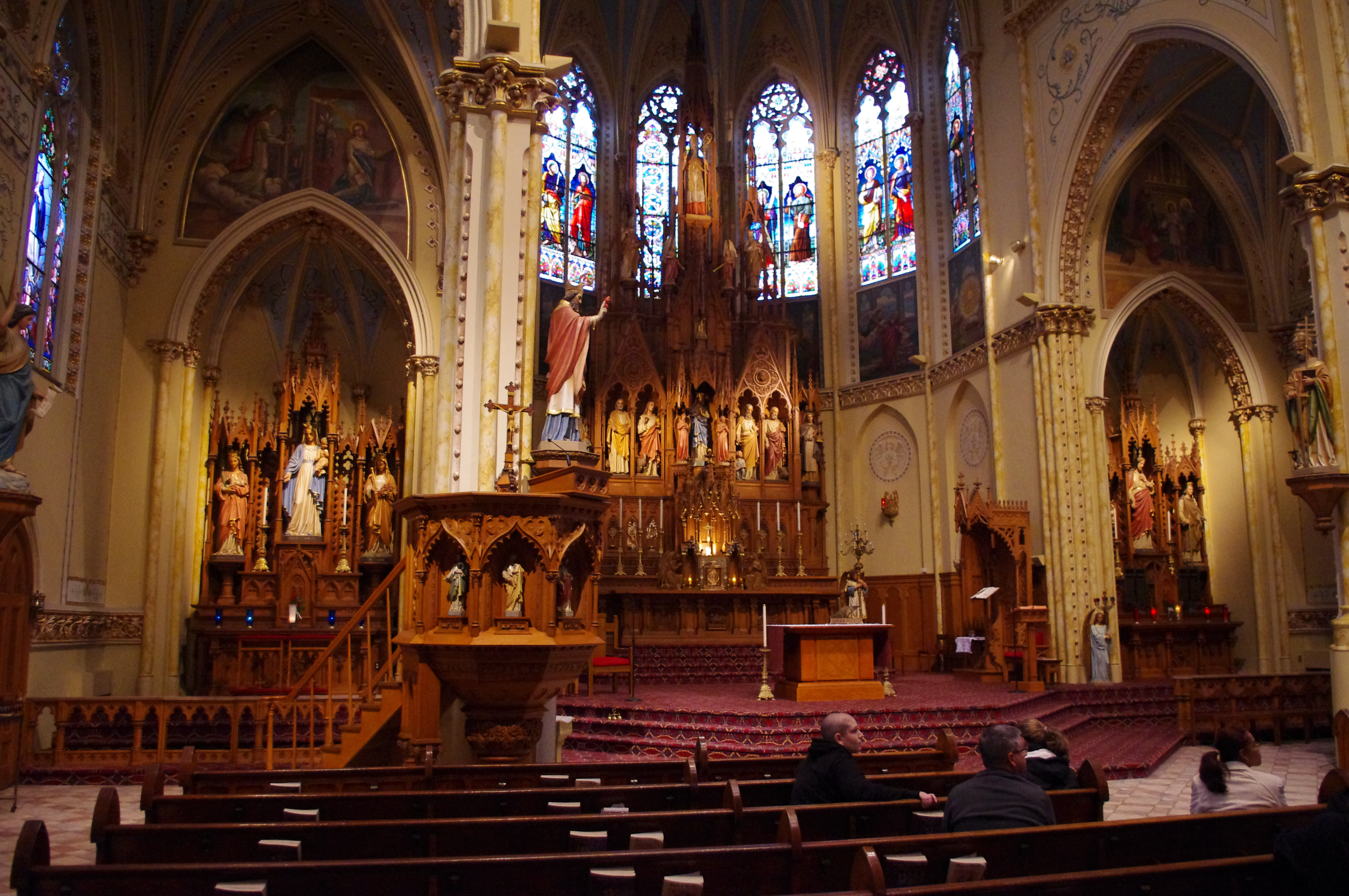
The Main and Side altars of The Shrine Church of St. Stanislaus post renovation in February 2011

In 2004, St. Stanislaus completed a $1.4 million renovation of the church's interior and on 8 May of that year, it was re-dedicated as the Shrine Church of St. Stanislaus.

In 2008, the administration of the parish was transferred from the care of Sacred Heart Province of the Order to Assumption Province, which is the Polish-American province of the Order.

In April 2007, a group of parishioners traveled to Kraków and brought back an icon, written in tempera by Polish iconographer Mado Anna Kucharska, depicting St. Stanislaus with John Paul II. Kucharska, after a transatlantic flight that week, added a golden Halo around John Paul's head on April 29, 2011. "We will have the first official image of Blessed John Paul II in the world," claimed Surufka. "I don't know anyone else who has an image of John Paul and is ready to unveil a halo seconds after he is beatified." The Beatification of Pope John Paul II was held on May 1, 2011.

In 2011, after 105 years of service, the Franciscan order left the Shrine Church of St. Stanislaus. "Our numbers are diminishing and we're aging," said Surufka. "The bottom line is we just don't have the men."

== Architecture ==
In August, 1881, Janietz secured a site, at north-east corner of the intersection of Forman St. and Tod (East 65th) St., in southern part of Cleveland, where most of the Poles had settled in proximity to the rolling mills, where many of them had found employment.

The property cost $3,000, and comprised thirteen lots, forming a square plat of land, with ample room for all the parish buildings.

=== Original church ===
On the east side of these lots Janietz had a plain frame, 35 ft (11 m) by 86 ft (26 m), building erected. The upper story served as a temporary church, and the lower story as a school. The building cost $4,600. It was dedicated to St. Stanislaus of Szczepanów by Gilmour, on Sunday, November 13, 1881.

Kolaszewski had the frame church enlarged in the following year, at an outlay of $1,500, to accommodate his rapidly increasing parish.

=== Present church ===
In August, 1886, the foundation for the present church, 85 ft (26 m) by 200 ft (61 m), was begun, and the church enclosed during the following year. Locally made warm red brick and dressed stone were used in its construction. Steadily it neared completion, until it was ready for dedication on Sunday, November 15, 1891, 1891. Boff, administrator of the diocese, performed the dedication ceremony. Houck wrote, it is the largest and one of the most beautiful churches in the diocese. It had two spires, each 232 ft (71 m) in height, and its architecture is pure Gothic. Houck wrote that it cost nearly $150,000, inclusive of altars, pews and statuary. Others wrote it cost $250,000.

In Polish Americans and their communities of Cleveland, historian John Grabowski describes the church, that it, "[...] was (and is) the largest Gothic church ever built by Catholics in Ohio and indeed, was second in size only to St. Patrick's Cathedral in New York among the Gothic churches built by Catholics in America." Grabowski further describes the church as "[...] a symbol of a people who paid for it from money earned at the Newburgh Rolling Mills which, as we recall, was $7.25 per week."

The walls were refrescoed in 1958.

==== Relics ====
A visit to the church, November 13, 2010, arranged as part of the Treasures of Heaven; Saints, Relics and Devotion in Medieval Europe exhibit at the Cleveland Museum of Art, highlighted the church's art and relics which range from a fragment of the True Cross to a mitre of Blessed John Paul II. The exhibition, from October 17, 2010, to January 17, 2011, featured over 135 objects from more than 40 institutions including the Vatican. It reminded parishioners, and Clevelanders, of these under-appreciated sacred works.

The relic of the True Cross stands next to the Pietà near the entrance to the church. The six niches in the reredos of the high altar contain numerous relics including those of Ss. Bonaventure, Clare, the True Cross, Francis, Gemma, John Vianney, Pope Pius X and Stanislaus. In the shrine area you can see the combined relics of Ss. Francis, Anthony and Clare positioned centrally within the Franciscan altar. In the little niche beneath the ecce homo statue on the altar of the Passion is the reliquary, brought up from the lower church, containing relics of Ss. George, Gerard, James, Ignatius of Loyola, Julian, Ivan, Joseph of Leonessa, Lawrence, Louis, Nicasius, Sebastian, Theodosius and Thérèse of Lisieux.

== See also ==
- List of Registered Historic Places in Cleveland, Ohio
- Sacred Heart of Jesus Church
- St. Casimir Church
- Immaculate Heart of Mary Church
