= Kate Kuenstler =

American Roman Catholic nun and canon lawyer (1949–2019)

Sister Kate Kuenstler PHJC, JCD
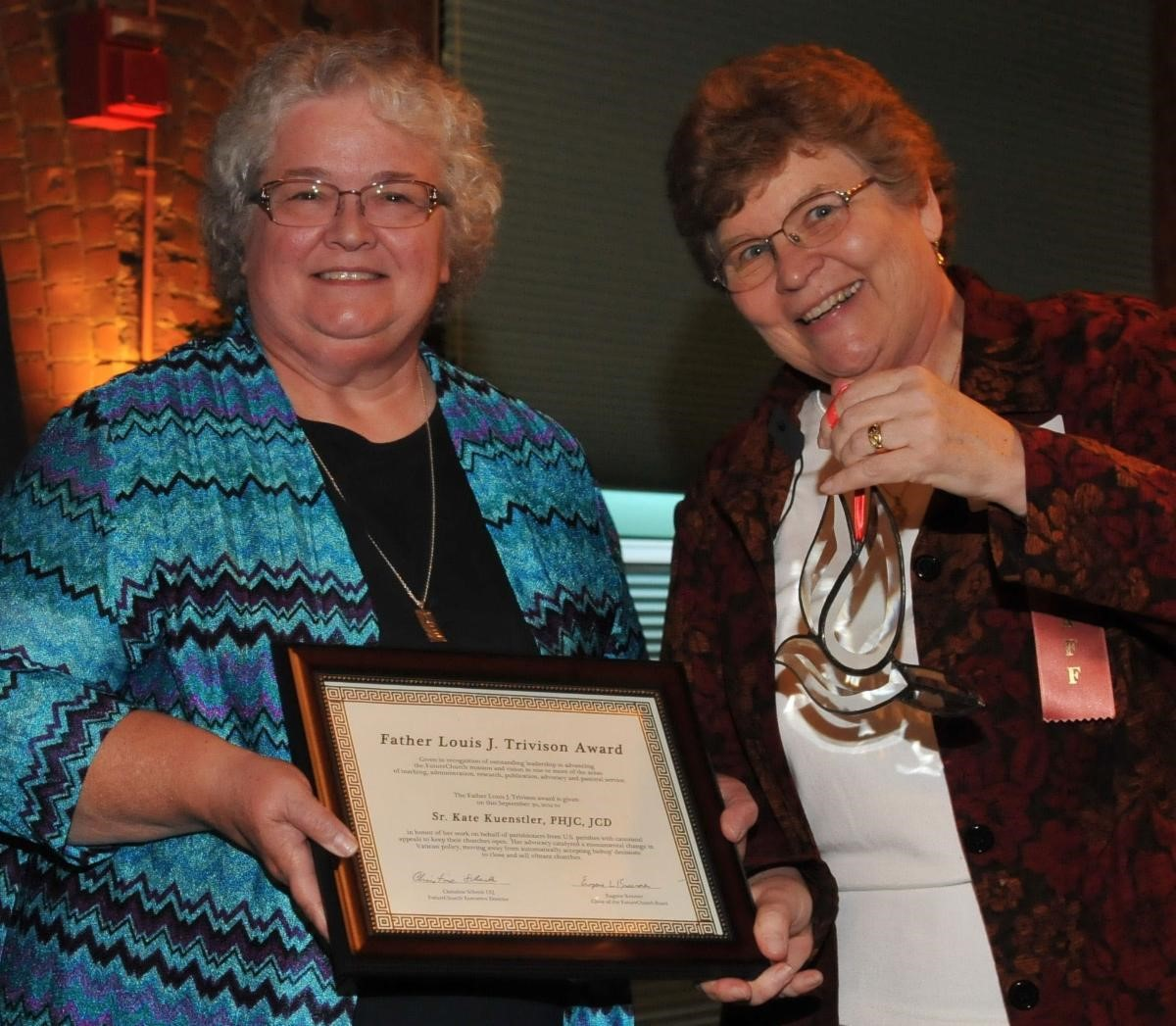
- Sr. Kate Kuenstler (left) receives the Trivison award from Sr. Christine Schenk, 2012

Personal life
- Born: Mary Kathleen Kuenstler; January 21, 1949 St. Louis, Missouri, U.S.
- Died: October 28, 2019 (aged 70) Donaldson, Indiana, U.S.
- Occupation: Canon lawyer

Religious life
- Religion: Catholic

Kate Kuenstler (1949-2019) was an American Roman Catholic sister and a canon lawyer. She mounted a legal defense on behalf of the canonical rights of lay people as laid out during Vatican II, and the result changed Vatican policy. Before she began bringing cases, Rome automatically affirmed U.S. bishops' rights to close and sell churches, even if they had vibrant congregations. After she intervened and argued on behalf of parishioners who had organized to save their churches, the Vatican agreed to order that many churches reopen. She is the subject of the 2024 book Bending Toward Justice: Sr. Kate Kuenstler and the Struggle for Parish Rights by Christine Schenk CSJ.

== Youth and entry into religious life ==
Mary Kathleen Kuenstler was born Jan. 21, 1949, in St. Louis City, Missouri, and was adopted by Lawrence John Kuenstler (1911–1983) and Lorraine Helen Buerster Kuenstler (1915–2003). Inspired by the Catholic sisters who taught her in elementary and high school, Kuenstler joined the Poor Handmaids of Jesus Christ, located in Donaldson, Indiana, in 1967. She professed vows in 1970.

She received a bachelor's degree in education from St. Joseph's College in East Chicago, Indiana, and began her first ministry in education as an elementary teacher for almost 10 years at schools in Indiana and Minnesota. She earned a master's degree in religious education and ministered as a director of education and a diocesan consultant in the Diocese of Springfield in Illinois and in the Diocese of Belleville.

== Becoming a canon lawyer ==
Asked by her community to pursue studies in canon law, Kuenstler earned a licentiate and doctorate in canon law from Pontifical University of St. Thomas Aquinas in Rome in 1992. She served several terms as a marriage tribunal judge before opening her own practice as an independent canon lawyer with a special focus on the rights of the laity. Kuenstler's practice covered many states and countries, including Canada and Australia.

== Defending parishes slated for closing, and awards ==
Her legal defense of the canonical rights of lay people changed Vatican policy. Previously the Holy See automatically accepted U.S. bishops' decisions to close and sell vibrant churches. After her intervention its policy became one that preserves those churches as worship sites instead.

In 2012 she received the Rev. Louis J. Trivison Award from FutureChurch for her canonical advocacy. Her work is chronicled in a 2017 documentary, "Foreclosing on Faith." A December 2024 book from Sheed & Ward, Bending Toward Justice: Sr. Kate Kuenstler and the Struggle for Parish Rights by FutureChurch co-founder Christine Schenk, also includes her biography.

In a 2017 interview for Commonweal, she noted that it is quite common for bishops to shut parishes that are financially solvent and merge them with a poorer parish that owes money to the diocese. The solvent parish is eventually sold allowing the newly merged congregation to pay off the debt owed to the diocese. In the course of her career, Kuenstler assisted hundreds of parish communities in at least 48 dioceses.

Kuenstler's canonical jurisprudence was subsequently validated by Vatican guidelines issued in April 2013, and again in July, 2020. Kuenstler's work set precedent for other canon lawyers. The 2017 documentary "Foreclosing on Faith" details her work with successful parishioner appeals in New York City and Cleveland, Ohio. The documentary also features Kuenstler's analysis of Boston's 2004 attempt to close 83 parishes.

== Retirement ==
Following an unexpected illness, Kuenstler moved to Catherine's Cottage, established by the Poor Handmaids of Jesus Christ, in January 2019. and then to the Catherine Kasper Home in Donaldson, Indiana, home of their motherhouse, in May 2019. She died there on October 28 of the same year.
