= St. Peter Church (Cleveland) =

St. Peter's Church
- Location within Ohio
- 41.50572°N 81.68132°W
- Location: Cleveland, Ohio
- Country: United States
- Denomination: Roman Catholic Church
- Website: stpetercleveland.org

History
- Status: Parish church
- Founded: 1853
- Founder: Rev. Fr. John H. Luhr
- Dedication: St. Peter
- Dedicated: 23 October 1859

Architecture
- Functional status: Active
- Heritage designation: Cleveland Designated Landmark
- Architect: Charles Heard
- Architectural type: Church

Administration
- Province: Cincinnati
- Diocese: Cleveland

Clergy
- Pastor(s): Fr. Philip J Bernier, OFM Cap

St. Peter Church (German: Kirche St. Peter), is a Catholic parish church in Cleveland, Ohio and part of the Diocese of Cleveland. Founded in 1853, it is located at the intersection of Superior Ave. near East 17th St., in the Downtown neighborhood.

The church is a longstanding city landmark; George Francis Houck, then the Chancellor, wrote in 1903 that, "One of the landmarks of the city and Diocese of Cleveland is St. Peter's Church." It is listed as a Cleveland Designated Landmark. It is also a named feature in the Geographic Names Information System.

== History ==
=== Founding ===
After the Cathedral of St. John the Evangelist had been opened, on 7 November 1852, St. Mary's on the Flats was assigned to the Germans, under the pastoral care of the Missionaries of the Precious Blood and Father Nicholas Roupp. Father John H. Luhr, the founder, transferred from Canton, Ohio to Cleveland, was appointed their first resident pastor in February, 1853.

As the Catholic Germans lived too widely separated to make St. Mary's on the Flats a convenient place of worship for all. Luhr's proposition, to have those living east of the river organize as a distinct congregation, was approved by Rappe, who authorized them to purchase a site for church purposes at the corner of Superior and Dodge streets. This was the beginning of St. Peter's congregation.

=== 19th Century ===
But the building and its location in the Flats were unsatisfactory to the parishioners, who, with few exceptions, lived on the surrounding bluffs and were loath to descend the steep hills and cross the meandering Cuyahoga River to reach St. Mary's on the Flats below. So the plan was conceived to build a church in a location more to their liking. Having collected some funds. Luhr purchased, 10 March 1854, on the southeast corner of Superior and Dodge streets, a plat of ground 132 ft (40 m) by 132 ft (40 m), at a cost of $8,000. The location in the East End of the then straggling town of Cleveland displeased the German speaking Catholics on the West Side, who, after St. Peter's had been organized, continued to worship in St. Mary's on the Flats until their own church, at the corner of Jersey and Carroll streets, was ready for occupancy. Pending the completion of their first little church and school building the members of St. Peter's congregation had services for a time in the basement of the cathedral.

In the fall of 1863, Luhr engaged the services of the Brothers of Mary for the boys' school; lay teachers were in charge of the girls, until the advent of the Ladies of the Sacred Heart of Mary, whose services he engaged in September, 1864.

Luhr, towards the end of his pastorate, was persecuted by a number of parishioners, who resented the dismissal of a lay teacher. Subsequent events, however, showed that Luhr had good reasons on moral grounds for the dismissal but led to a rupture between the pastor and a portion of his people. But it was too late to undo the evil wrought by opposition on the part of some prominent members belonging to St. Boniface's Society. Tn course of the discussion this organization withdrew as a church society, and ever since its withdrawal in the latter part of the 1860s, eked out a precarious existence. Luhr, weary of opposition, resigned the pastorate of St. Peter's and moved to Cincinnati, in January, 1868, where Bishop John Baptist Purcell placed him in charge of a large parish. There he died, 2 August 1872, a zealous, hard working, faithful priest to the last.

After Luhr's departure for Cincinnati, Father Francis Westerholt was appointed by Rappe to take charge of the parish. On Sunday, 19 January 1868, Rappe installed Westerholt as pastor.

In the spring of 1873, the contract was let for a spacious new school building. To make room for it, the first old two-story structure, built by Luhr in 1854, was torn down, and additional ground, 45 ft (14 m) by 145 ft (44 m), was purchased from Henry Kramer, one of the pioneer members and special benefactors of the parish.

The new school was large and commodious, consisting of a basement and two stories; the first floor containing two classrooms, a corridor, and, next to it, a chapel, provided with an arched sanctuary and furnished with an altar, pipe organ, stations, etc. The second story was arranged for four classrooms, divided evenly by a corridor in the center. The aggregate cost of St. Peter's school, as designed and built in 1873, amounted to $26,000. In September, 1874, the new school was ready for occupancy. To render the course of instruction more effectual a third room was added to the boys' department, taught by the Brothers from St. Mary's Institute, Dayton, Ohio.

Up to this time the religious community, known as the Ladies of the Sacred Heart of Mary, on Harmon street, Cleveland, had charge of and taught the girls attending St. Peter's school (1864-1874). They were replaced by Sisters of Notre Dame of Coesfeld, known as the Coesfeld-Cleveland community. This branch of the Notre Dames was founded in Coesfeld, Westphalia, in 1850. with the approbation of Bishop Johann Georg Müller, of the Roman Catholic Diocese of Münster. Like so many other religious societies, this community of Sisters had to flee from Germany in consequence of the iniquitous Falk Laws of 1872. At the suggestion of Westerholt, Bishop Richard Gilmour invited them to the Diocese of Cleveland, and approved the plan of placing St. Peter's girls' school under their direction. Accordingly, three Notre Dame Sisters were employed for the first time in the Diocese of Cleveland at St. Peter's school 1 September 1874. From their convent home, in the shadow of St. Peter's, these excellent Sisters have gradually extended their usefulness to various other schools, so that their arrival in the United States, on 4 July 1874, has proved a veritable blessing to the diocese at large, and St. Peter's Church in particular.

To provide a new dwelling for the Brothers of Mary, whose house had been sold to the Notre Dame Convent, a lot, 40 ft (12 m) by 130 ft (40 m), on Huntington street, adjoining the Sisters' property, was purchased in the summer of 1878 for $3,000. A frame building, formerly owned by the convent, was moved thereon, and arranged to serve as an abode for the Brothers.

During the following years Westerholt's efforts were directed toward the improving and beautifying of the interior of St. Peter's Church. The organ loft was enlarged in 1883; the following year a number of beautiful statues were purchased for the various altars, and in 1885 the whole interior of the church was frescoed and decorated. It was also provided with new stained glass windows, modern gas lighting fixtures, and a variety of other church furniture.

In the summer of 1887 the priest's house, put up by Luhr, was torn down and replaced by a large pastoral residence adjoining the rear of the church, at a cost of $12,000. In the same year a third story was added to St. Peter's school building, and arranged for a parish hall, containing a stage and other conveniences, at a cost of $10,000.

In the synod of January 3, 1889, St. Peter's congregation was the first mentioned among the nine principal churches of the diocese which Gilmour named as rectorates, with an irremovable pastor — the Westerholt being its first rector. (Note: According to the Catholic Encyclopedia, when a certain rectorship has once been declared irremovable, it is not in the power of the ordinary to reduce it to the status of a removable rectorship. This is plain from the Third Council of Baltimore, as well as from the general law of the Church, which forbids ecclesiastical superiors to lower the status or condition of churches. When a parish is declared an irremovable rectorship, the appointment of the first rector lies with the bishop after hearing the diocesan consultors. For instituting all other irremovable rectors, it is necessary that a written examination or concursus be held, at which the same questions must be proposed to all the candidates. From among those whom the examiners shall deem worthy after a consideration of their answers and testimonials, the bishop selects one on whom he confers the parish.)

On November 20, 1896, after a few hours' illness, Westerholt died. To appoint a successor a concursus had to be held, in accordance with the regulations of the III Plenary Council of Baltimore.

Father Nicholas Pfeil, formerly of Holy Trinity, Avon, Ohio, received his appointment on 10 May 1897, and was publicly welcomed by the congregation in a reception given him at St. Peter's hall, on 6 June 1897.

During his administration a high school grade was added to the course of studies for the boys' department in September, 1899, and placed in charge of the Brothers of Mary.

=== 20th Century ===
To provide a suitable site for additional parochial structures in the future, a plat of ground, 102 ft (31 m) by 150 ft (46 m) in size, at the corner of Superior and Huntington streets, was purchased on January 16, 1900, for $8,670.

By the 1990s, St. Peter Church was composed of families from around the diocese and several counties. Under the direction of Fr. Robert J. Marrone, the worship style of the parish drastically changed. Much of the ornamentation was removed from the sanctuary and nave, and chairs replaced pews. The liturgy took a unique style that included gathering around the altar during the Eucharistic Prayer. Historic St. Peter's, as it was known, became a hallmark church for Liturgical Renewal.

=== 21st Century ===
In April, 2010, while under the pastoral leadership of Fr. Robert J. Marrone, the parish was closed by the Bishop of Cleveland, Richard Lennon. Several members developed a nonprofit organization to raise money, and continued to meet and worship together. The worshipping community invited Fr. Marrone to lead the community which organized into an independent, intentional Christian community in the Catholic Tradition.

A few members from the original St. Peter Parish appealed the Vatican to re-open the parish under the authority of the Diocese of Cleveland. Lennon, through a press release from the Diocesan Department of Communications announced that, "As indicated in my previous statement, I promised to inform you when I had received from the Vatican Congregation for Clergy decrees associated with parish appeals. The decrees arrived on Wednesday, March 14, 2012. The process to review these rulings will now be undertaken with my advisors." On 10 July 2012, Lennon announced the appointment of Father Robert J. Kropac as Pastor of St. Peter parish., and the parish officially re-opened on September 9, 2012 On March 4, 2013, Father Robert Marrone was excommunicated "latae setentiae" (automatically, by committing the offense, not by a church trial). The reason given was for schism, for having been disobedient to his ecclesiastical superiors in agreeing to oversee the breakaway community. Bishop Nelson Perez entrusted the pastoral leadership of the parish to the Capuchin Franciscan Friars of St. Augustine Province in 2019. Bishop Edward Malesic appointed Fr. Philip Bernier, OFM Cap, the Parish Administrator on October 1, 2020. On September, 12, 2022, the parish celebrated the 170th anniversary of its founding where Bishop Edward Malesic led the worship.

== Architecture ==
=== First Church ===
In the fall of 1854 the combination church and school was built. It was a brick structure, about 40 ft (12 m) by 80 ft (24 m), and consisted of two stories, surmounted by a belfry. The first floor was used for a church, the upper story served partly as a parochial school and partly as the priest's residence.

The congregation rapidly increased in numbers, so that additional room had to be provided for the large number of children attending the school.

About the year 1856, a two-story brick house was built on Dodge street on a lot bought 18 June 1856, of George C. Dodge, for $1,000, and adjoining the large vacant corner reserved by Luhr for a permanent church to be eventually erected.

=== Present Church ===
In the following year the present St. Peter's Church was built. Ground was broken in the summer of 1857 and the cornerstone was laid by Bishop Louis Amadeus Rappe, amid a vast outpouring of people, on 16 August 1857. A little over two years later the church was dedicated by Rappe, on 23 October 1859. Exclusive of altars, pews, pulpit, etc., the edifice cost $36,000. The great bulk of this amount was collected in small sums by Luhr, who in pioneer days walked great distances, wading through soggy fields and climbing rail fences, in an effort to obtain some distant Catholic's humble contribution toward the building of the church. During those days of pecuniary embarrassment, he went as far as Delphos, Ohio and Cincinnati to collect among friends for his congregation in Cleveland.

Tn 1867, Luhr purchased from the Vanduzen & Tift Company, in Cincinnati, three large bells. They were blessed on 10 February 1867, and ever since "ring in merrily the Lord's Day, sending their melodious voices from the lofty belfry of St. Peter's, far over the surrounding city".

In 1901, the interior of the church was improved and the church illuminated with electric light. In 1903, Houck wrote that, there were between four and five hundred lights artistically placed on columns, altars and dome, which when lighted reveal to good advantage the excellent paintings and architectural beauty of St. Peter's Church, and easily render it one of the most devotion inspiring sanctuaries in Cleveland.
