= Christine Schenk =

American Catholic nun (born 1949)

Sister Christine Schenk CSJ
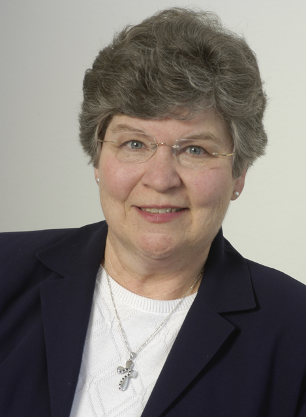
- Portrait by Jim Metresin, provided by FutureChurch

Personal life
- Born: January 20, 1946 (age 80) Lima, Ohio

Religious life
- Religion: Catholic

Christine Schenk CSJ (born January 20, 1946) is an American Catholic religious sister, author and member of the Sisters of St. Joseph. She is the founding director of FutureChurch, an international group of Catholics affiliated with parishes focusing on full lay participation in the life of the Church. The group was founded in 1990 and Schenk stepped down from her role in 2013.

Among other books, she is the author of Crispina and Her Sisters: Women and Authority in Early Christianity (Fortress 2017). Although she has published other books, the latter established her authority on women in the early church, taking first place in history from the Catholic Press Association. She is a columnist for National Catholic Reporter, and serves on its board.

== Early life, education, and Medical Mission Sisters ==
She was born in Lima, Ohio, to Joan Artz Schenk and Paul Anthony Schenk, and she is the oldest of four daughters. Her father, an insurance salesman, received the Purple Heart for his service in World War II, having spent 33 months in the Southwest Pacific. She attended Lima Central Catholic High School, graduating first in her class. In 2007, she was inducted into the Hall of Fame for her high school.

Schenk went to Washington, D.C., to attend Georgetown University, a Jesuit campus, on a full scholarship. During her first year, which was the 125th anniversary of the university, she attended a symposium featuring the Swiss Catholic theologian Hans Küng, the German Jesuit theologian Karl Rahner, and American Jesuit philosopher John Courtney Murray, an event that influenced her decision to study theology as well as nursing, and to pursue religious life. She earned a bachelor's of science degree in nursing and graduated at the top of her class. Her graduating class of 1968 included future president of the United States Bill Clinton and musician Bill Danoff. They were invited to celebrate their 25th reunion at the White House. She was inducted into Gamma Pi Epsilon, a national women's honor society for women at Jesuit colleges and universities.

She received a Master of Science degree in nursing education from another Jesuit campus, Boston College, in 1971. She joined the Medical Mission Sisters in 1972, and taught nursing for one year at Temple University. She then acquired community organizing skills while working for two and a half years as an interfaith coordinator with the Philadelphia United Farm Workers union during the grape and lettuce boycotts. She then earned a certificate in midwifery and family nursing from the Frontier School of Kentucky (now Frontier Nursing University). Eventually, she left the Medical Mission Sisters for health reasons. After a period of contemplative prayer, she decided that she was not well suited to foreign missions, so she left the MMS in 1977. She earned a second master's degree in theology, with distinction, at Saint Mary Seminary and Graduate School of Theology in 1993.

== Work as a nurse-midwife and Sisters of St. Joseph ==
After two years of clinical training at the Frontier School, she stayed for another year to teach. In 1978, Schenk moved to Cleveland to serve low-income families as a nurse midwife for 16 years. From 1984 to 1993, she worked with the Sanctuary Movement, and also with the Prenatal Investment Program (PNIP), a group trying to expand Medicaid to working-poor mothers and their children. Ultimately, she returned to life as a Catholic sister, choosing to work with the poor in the United States rather than going to the foreign missions as she had previously. She entered the Congregation of Saint Joseph, a group she admired for their work with the poor. Schenk professed her final vows in 1993.

== FutureChurch ==
In 1994, after twenty years as a nurse-midwife, she changed direction toward pastoral ministry and church reform. Schenk's role as a founder of FutureChurch grew out of work at her parish, the Community of St. Malachi. Upon the advice of Schenk's pastor, Paul Hritz, she and a group she formed partnered with the nearby Church of the Resurrection under the leadership of its pastor, Lou Trivison. That group had recently approved a resolution opening ordination to "all those called to it by God and the People of God," which would include married men, and women. The St. Malachi committee adopted it as well.

FutureChurch incorporated as a not-for-profit in 1994, eventually growing to include 3,000 national and international donors and many more parish-centered activists. Both of the parish committees that formed FutureChurch and then the organization itself wrote to National Conference of Catholic Bishops with a letter of concern, asking that the bishops seriously consider these issues, while maintaining what it describes as a "cordial, non-adversarial relationship with diocesan authorities". In conversation with their local bishop, Anthony Pilla, Schenk said they told him: "we would always do everything we could to be respectful of his leadership, but that we would be public about our concerns".

Schenk's religious congregation agreed to fund her full-time ministry with FutureChurch for a three-year period, after which time the organization became self-sustaining. This did not imply her religious community's endorsement, but rather that they respected her decision as being in line with their overall charism of unity, to "be one with God, among ourselves and with all others". FutureChurch worked with data from Richard Schoenherr and Lawrence A. Young, both sociologists, in their book and later academic article Full Pews and Empty Altars. Under Schenk's leadership, FutureChurch soon partnered with Call to Action (CTA), which was then the largest Catholic reform organization in the United States, with many regional chapters. Using priest shortage statistics from Schoenherr and Young, Schenk gave presentations to CTA regional chapters in scores of American dioceses. In most instances, this was the first time ordinary Catholics realized the extent of this looming problem; there was immediate pushback from some traditionalists. Despite opposition, it grew. By October 2013, FutureChurch was a diocesan network consisting of 28 parish councils, 100 parish leaders, and over 3,500 global, parish-focused activists. Schenk stepped down after 23 years of leadership. She was succeeded by Deborah Rose-Milavec.

== Books and media appearances ==
Schenk spent the next four years writing Crispina and Her Sisters: Women and Authority in Early Christianity, published by Fortress Press in 2017. The Jesuit Brian McDermott, reviewing for America: The Jesuit Review, described it as ample material to "radically transform our understanding of Christian women as authority figures in the early centuries". Ever since she entered the Sisters of St. Joseph, Schenk had wondered about early church women. In an interview with Georgetown University, she told of how the book also developed from her reflections when she saw male classmates being ordained. She recounted: "It hit me in a way I had never experienced it before – my own marginalization within the Catholic Church and what that can do to the psyche of women who you never see, women in sacred roles." The book took the first-place prize in history from the Catholic Press Association, now the Catholic Media Association.

Her second book, To Speak the Truth in Love: A Biography of Sr. Theresa Kane RSM (Orbis Press 2019) took first place in the biography category from both The Association of Catholic Publishers and the Catholic Press Association. Schenk was featured in an award-winning documentary from Rebecca Parrish and Nicole Bernardo-Reese, Radical Grace. She is also featured in the 2017 documentary produced by Viktoria Somogyi and Jeff MacIntyre, Foreclosing on Faith: America’s Church Closing Crisis. The latter profiles Kate Kuenstler, a nun whose advocacy as a canon lawyer changed Vatican policy regarding whether to close vibrant parishes simply to pay off church debts, the subject of her 2024 book.

Her most recent book is Bending Toward Justice: Sr. Kate Kuenstler and the Struggle for Parish Rights, published by Sheed & Ward in late 2024. On April 30, 2025, National Catholic Reporter live-streamed a book launch event from her alma mater, Georgetown University, reaching a global audience.
