= Lima Central Catholic High School =

Location
- 720 South Cable Road; Lima, Ohio 45805; United States
- Coordinates: 40°43′54″N 84°8′54″W

Information
- Type: Private parochial school
- Motto: Lead, Serve, Excel
- Religious affiliation: Roman Catholic
- Established: 1959
- Oversight: Roman Catholic Diocese of Toledo
- Principal: Stephanie Williams
- Chaplain: Liam Stolly
- Grades: 9–12
- Enrollment: 280 (2018)
- Student to teacher ratio: 14:1
- Colors: Scarlet and Columbia Blue
- Mascot: Thunderbird
- Website: www.lcchs.edu

Lima Central Catholic High School (LCC) is a private parochial school in Lima, Ohio, United States. It is part of the Roman Catholic Diocese of Toledo.

== Ohio High School Athletic Association State Championships ==
- Boys Golf - 2002, 2003, 2005
- Boys Baseball - 1951*
- Boys Basketball - 2010, 2014, 2016
- Girls Volleyball - 2007
- Boys Track & Field - 2014
- Girls Golf - 2018, 2019, 2020, 2021

* Won by St. Rose High School prior to consolidation into Lima Central Catholic. St. Rose is now an elementary school only.

== Notable alumni ==
- Jim Lynch, football player
- Thomas Lynch, United States Navy rear admiral
- Sr. Christine Schenk, Roman Catholic nun, author, and founder of FutureChurch. Member of the school's Hall of Fame.
