= FutureChurch =

American religious organization

FutureChurch is an American religious organization that advocates for a variety of causes within the Catholic Church. It is based in Lakewood, Ohio and supports women's ordination, the advancement of feminist theology, and an end to mandatory priestly celibacy. It has been characterized as "liberal" by the Cleveland Plain Dealer.

FutureChurch has been characterized as a "national" and even "international" group, but is active primarily in the Cleveland metropolitan area. Its executive director is Deborah Rose-Milavec.

== History ==
FutureChurch was founded in 1990 in Cleveland, Ohio, by Sr. Christine Schenk, Fr. Louis Trivison, and others. It was incorporated as a non-profit organization in 1994.

In its early years, FutureChurch was in a friendly dialogue with the Diocese of Cleveland. However, in 2004 the Cleveland diocese, led by Bishop Anthony Michael Pilla, released a statement critical of the organization. Shortly after Richard Lennon succeeded Pilla as Bishop of Cleveland on May 15, 2006, FutureChurch began looking for another location for its office. There were rumors that Lennon had refused them permission to operate out of churches in the Cleveland diocese, but these rumors were not officially confirmed by FutureChurch or by the archdiocese.

When Bishop Lennon decided to close several Catholic parishes in the Diocese of Cleveland, FutureChurch was one of the groups that contested this move. According to Eugene Kramer, the chairman of the FutureChurch Board of Trustees, Bishop Lennon met with the organization's leaders in January 2007 to discuss alternatives to the parish closings. When the closings went ahead, some Catholics in the diocese appealed to the Vatican, and in March 2012, the Vatican overruled Bishop Lennon on this matter.

After the Congregation for the Doctrine of the Faith mandated certain changes in the Leadership Conference of Women Religious in April 2012, FutureChurch helped to rally support for religious sisters in Cleveland.

== Mission ==
FutureChurch seeks the full participation of all Catholics in the life and leadership of the Church. FutureChurch works for: Just, open and collaborative structures for Catholic worship, organization and governance; a return to the Church's early tradition of both married and celibate priests; a return to the Church's earliest tradition, "modeled on the inclusive practice of Jesus", of recognizing both female and male leaders of faith communities; and, regular access to the Eucharist, the center of Catholic life and worship for all Catholics.
