= George Francis Houck =

Monsignor George Francis Houck
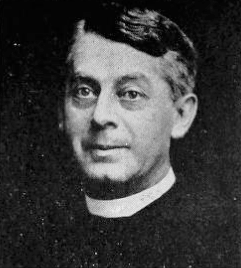
- Born: July 9, 1847; Tiffin, Ohio
- Died: March 26, 1916 (aged 68); Lakewood, Ohio
- Resting place: St. Joseph Catholic Cemetery
- Education: St. Mary's Seminary
- Occupation: Roman Catholic Priest
- Years active: 4 July 1875–
- Employer: Roman Catholic Diocese of Cleveland
- Known for: Systematizing the operations of cemeteries in the Diocese of Cleveland.
- Notable work: Volume one of A History of Catholicity in Northern Ohio and the Diocese of Cleveland from 1749 to December 31, 1900
- Title: Chancellor
- Parent(s): John and Odile (Fischer) Houck

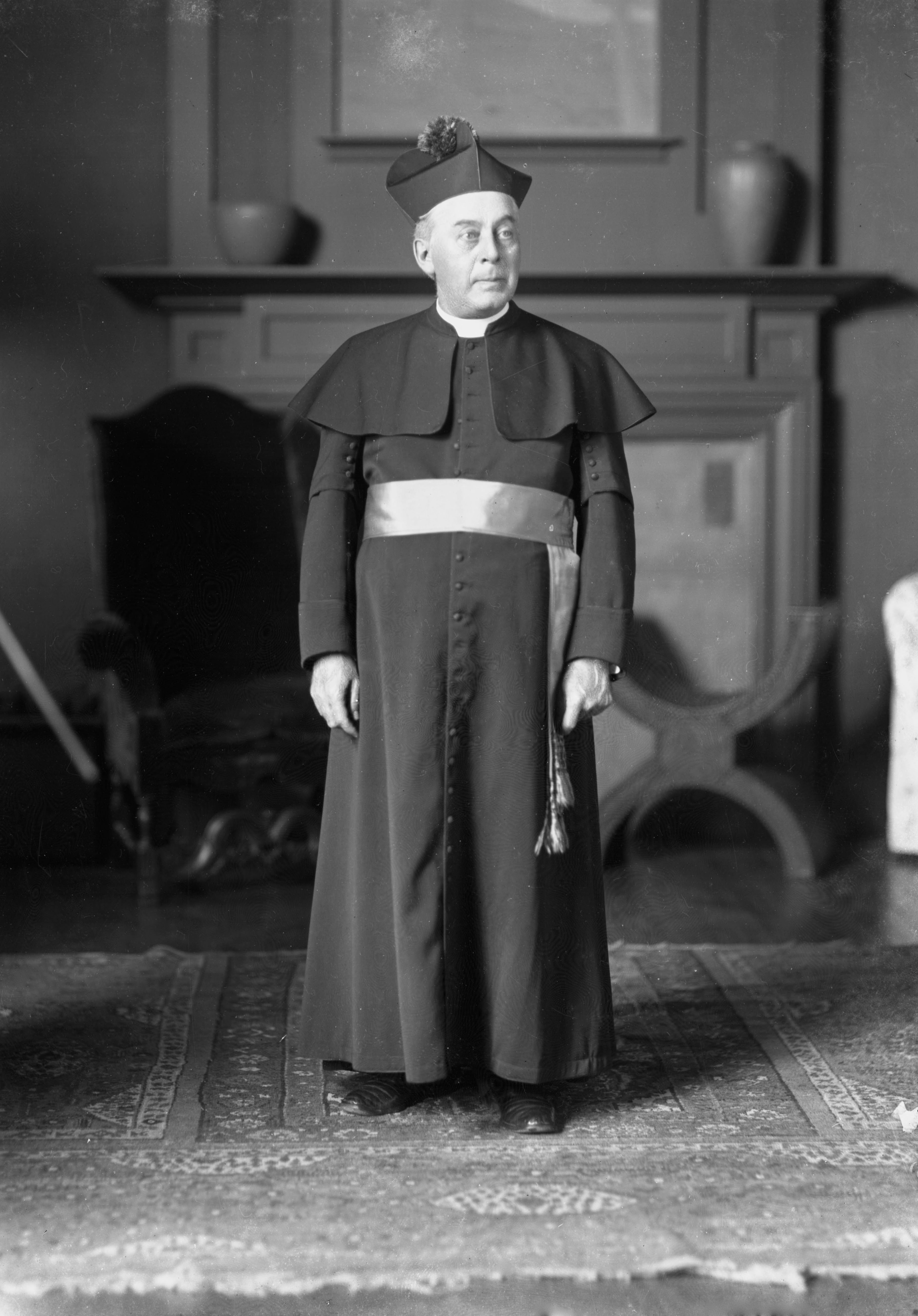
Rev. G. F. Houck (1911)

George Francis Houck (July 9, 1847 – March 26, 1916) was Chancellor of the Roman Catholic Diocese of Cleveland from 1882 to 1908. He also wrote Volume One of the 1903 A History of Catholicity in Northern Ohio and the Diocese of Cleveland from 1749 to December 31, 1900, an overview history of Roman Catholicism in northern Ohio beginning with Catholic missions in the American frontier of the Ohio Country, one of the first settled parts of the Midwestern United States, and concluding with a history of the Cleveland diocese through the end of the 19th century.

== Early life ==
Houck was born July 9, 1847, in Tiffin, Ohio. His parents were John and Odile (Fischer) Houck. They were natives of Germany. His father immigrated to this country from the Grand Duchy of Baden when he was four years old, his mother when she was ten years old. They were married February 16, 1846. For forty years John Houck was a shoe merchant in Tiffin. For two years, when Houck was eighteen years old and his father was sick, Houck took complete charge of the business.

Houck attended St. Joseph's parochial school in Tiffin. He subsequently spent two years in Heidelberg College also in Tiffin. He entered Mount St. Mary's Seminary of the West in Cincinnati, in 1867. He pursued his studies in that institution until 1874. While there he was the seminary's bookkeeper, and was also assistant librarian for five years. He was then called by Bishop Richard Gilmour to Saint Mary Seminary and Graduate School of Theology, Cleveland.

== Priesthood ==
Houck received Holy Orders July 4, 1875, from Bishop Edward Fitzgerald of the Roman Catholic Diocese of Little Rock, in Cleveland, then performing the duties of Gilmour, who suffered a mental breakdown in 1874 and was in southern France for recuperation.

Houck's first assignment as a priest, soon after his ordination, was as pastor of St. Joseph's Church, Crestline, Ohio. In July 1877, he was appointed Secretary to Gilmour, with duties of chancellor; in May 1882, he was appointed the Chancellor also. Michael W. Carr, of the Catholic Historical Society, described Houck as "the most painstaking, faithful, and efficient chancellor and secretary in any diocese in the country".

For seventeen years, 1877–1894, he was chaplain of the Cleveland workhouse, a type of prison in which the sentence includes manual labor.

In July 1877, Houck was appointed chaplain of St. Vincent's Charity Hospital, Cleveland.

St. John's and St. Joseph's Cemeteries, up until 1878, were managed by the curates of Cathedral of St. John the Evangelist; in 1878, Gilmour appointed Houck manager of both cemeteries.

Despite the rapid growth in Cleveland's population, the amount of land set aside for use as burial grounds remained unchanged until 1893 when Calvary Cemetery was purchased. That year, Bishop Ignatius Frederick Horstmann appointed Houck manager of this additional cemetery to oversee improvements of the property. This new 50 acres (20 ha) cemetery, in Newburgh Township, was easily reached by tram from all parts of the city. On November 26, 1894, Houck, as Horstmann's delegate, consecrated one-half of the grounds. He reformed and systematized the operations of the cemeteries under his management. Carr described the positive changes:

The former lack of system in the conduct of these burial places has since given way to order and strict regulation, much to the satisfaction of the Catholic public. It is needless to say that great labor and a high order of ability have been required to cause to obtain, instead of the chaos of the past, the splendid system of the present.

In 1900, an additional 50 acres (20 ha) were purchased making the entire cemetery site one hundred acres in extent. During the same year, also, an electric funeral car was introduced, which rapidly grew in public favor.

He celebrated, on July 24, 1902, his twenty-fifth anniversary as Chancellor. Horstmann and over one-hundred-sixty priests were present.

Writing in 1903, Carr further described Houck:

A study of the strong, expressive countenance of Houck, so aptly portrayed in the accompanying engraving, will bear out what has just been said. That countenance evidences also the happy blending of strength and vigor of mind with a mild but rigidly exacting manner. Moreover, it indicates that he will not yield his convictions, except to authority and as an act of obedience, but that he will go more than half-way that generous justice be done. His many pronounced qualities, however, and the seeming intensity of his firmness and decision of character are so modified by the Christian graces as to apparently unite without distinction all his faculties in a harmonious and lovable personality.

On July 25, 1904, Pope Pius X granted him the title Monsignor.

Houck died on March 26, 1916, and he is buried at St. Joseph Catholic Cemetery in Tiffin, Ohio.

== Historical writing ==
In 1888 Houck wrote A Memoir of the Life and Labors of the Right Rev. Amadeus Rappe, D.D., First Bishop of Cleveland. It was translated to French in 1890.

In 1889–1890, he published The Church in Northern Ohio and in the Diocese of Cleveland, which was printed in one German language and three English language editions.

He expanded and revised The Church in Northern Ohio and in the Diocese of Cleveland: from 1817 to September, 1887 with additional facts and published it as Volume One of the 1903 A History of Catholicity in Northern Ohio and the Diocese of Cleveland from 1749 to December 31, 1900.

Horstmann concluded his approbation of Houck's Volume One of the 1903 A History of Catholicity in Northern Ohio and the Diocese of Cleveland from 1749 to December 31, 1900, with two verses from the New Testament:

1. "Gather up the fragments lest they be lost", from the Multiplication of the Loaves, translated for the 21st century as, "When they had had their fill, he said to his disciples, 'Gather the fragments left over, so that nothing will be wasted.'"
2. "Go and do in like manner", from the parable of the Good Samaritan who binds up wounds, translated for the 21st century as: "Jesus said to him, 'Go and do likewise.'"

Horstmann's approbation should be seen in the context of his interest in history. Horstmann and Houck were both listed, on the same page with some important figures in the history of the diocese, as donors of materials to the American Catholic Historical Society of Philadelphia. (Note: Among those listed in the 1887 "Librarian's Report" to American Catholic Historical Society of Philadelphia are: Bishop Louis de Goesbriand, of the Diocese of Burlington, Vermont Vicar general in the Diocese of Cleveland until 1853. Administrator in the Diocese of Cleveland, September, 1849 – August, 1850. Bishop Richard Gilmour, of the Diocese of Cleveland, Ohio Monsignor Felix M. Boff, Cleveland, Ohio Vicar general of the Diocese of Cleveland, 1873–1876. Administrator of the Diocese of Cleveland, 1874–1876. Administrator of the Diocese of Cleveland, July, 1882 – February, 1883. Administrator of the Diocese of Cleveland, May, 1885 – October, 1885. Administrator of the Diocese of Cleveland, 1891 – March 1892. Very Rev. Ignatius F. Horstmann, Chancellor, Diocese of Philadelphia, Pennsylvania Bishop of the Diocese of Cleveland, February, 1892 – May, 1908. Father G. F. Houck, Episcopal Secretary, Diocese of Cleveland, Ohio They all donated either written works or other physical objects.) Horstmann was an organizing member, since 1884, while he was still a priest and later Chancellor of the Roman Catholic Archdiocese of Philadelphia. Horstmann wrote, in his approbation, that he understood this work to be a model history for other dioceses and took credit for proposing a diocesan history. (Note: The full text of Bishop Horstmann's Approbation. The great work which I proposed in 1899 – a History of the Diocese of Cleveland – has now been completed. I know what labor has been expended by both the authors and the publishers in giving it to the Clergy, the Religious, and the faithful of the Diocese of Cleveland. No one, unless he has undertaken such labor, can imagine how exact must be the investigation, and how careful and critical the examination, to make a faithful record of what has taken place in the history of a diocese from its beginning. I feel assured that this History will be a model for the other dioceses of the country, and I hope it will incite capable men everywhere to take up the same character of work and carry it out with equal diligence and success. We need such records. They will be invaluable for future historians. They show what those who have gone before us in the Faith, bishops, priests and people, have done for the propagation and preservation of the Church in their day. Our thanks are due to the Rev. Chancellor Houck who, for a number of years, and especially since 1899, has devoted so much of his spare time to this work, which I know is thoroughly reliable. We therefore commend it to our clergy and to the laity, and hope that Mr. M. W. Carr and the Catholic Historical Society, who have now finished the work, will be rewarded abundantly. "Gather up the fragments lest they be lost." This History has fulfilled that precept. May others "go and do in like manner." †; Ignatius F. Horstmann, Bishop of Cleveland. Cleveland, Ohio, Feast of St. Ignatius, Bishop and Martyr, February 1, 1903.) Houck's other works did not include an approbation.

== Works or publications ==
Houck's newer published works are revisions and expansions of his older works. His subjects are northern Ohio Catholic Church history and biographies of Catholics in northern Ohio.

- Houck, George Francis (1887). The Church in Northern Ohio and in the Diocese of Cleveland: from 1817 to September, 1887. New York, NY; Cincinnati, OH; Chicago, IL: Benziger Brothers. hdl:2186/ksl:houchu00. LCCN 40015495. OCLC 5103774.
- Houck, George Francis (December 24, 1888). A Memoir of the Life and Labors of the Right Rev. Amadeus Rappe, D.D., First Bishop of Cleveland. Written for the New York Catholic Historical Society. Cleveland, OH: s.n. OCLC 19896636.
- Houck, George Francis (1889) [1887]. The Church in Northern Ohio and in the Diocese of Cleveland: from 1817 to September, 1887 (PDF) (3rd ed.). Cleveland, OH: Short & Forman. Archived from the original on December 6, 2010.
- Houck, George Francis (1890) [First published in English 1888]. Vie du T. R. Amédée Rappe: premier évêque de Cleveland [Life of T. R. Amadeus Rappe: first bishop of Cleveland] (in French). Translated from English by [s.n.] Gros. Calais, FR: Imprimerie des Orphelins. OCLC 5739627.
- Houck, George Francis (1890). Die Kirche in Nord-Ohio und in der Diöcese Cleveland. 1749-1890 [The Church in Northern Ohio and in the Diocese of Cleveland. 1749-1890] (in German) (1st aufl. ed.). Cleveland, OH: Harks Brothers. OCLC 6628347.
- Houck, George Francis (1891) [Read before the American Catholic Historical Society on 27 November 1888]. "Historical sketch of Early Catholicity and the first Catholic Church in Cleveland, Ohio". Records of the American Catholic Historical Society of Philadelphia. III—1888–1891. Philadelphia, PA: American Catholic Historical Society of Philadelphia: 129–141. ISSN 0002-7790. LCCN 2001233814. OCLC 1479632.
- Houck, George Francis (1903). A History of Catholicity in Northern Ohio and the Diocese of Cleveland from 1749 to December 31, 1900 (PDF). Vol. v.1 (Historical). Cleveland, OH: Press of J.B. Savage. LCCN 03014163. OCLC 1260400. Archived from the original on July 1, 2008.
- Houck, George Francis (1908). "Cleveland" . In Herbermann, Charles George (ed.). The Catholic Encyclopedia. Vol. 4. Cland–Diocesan. New York, NY: Robert Appleton Company. OCLC 1017058.
