= Thiava, Numidia =

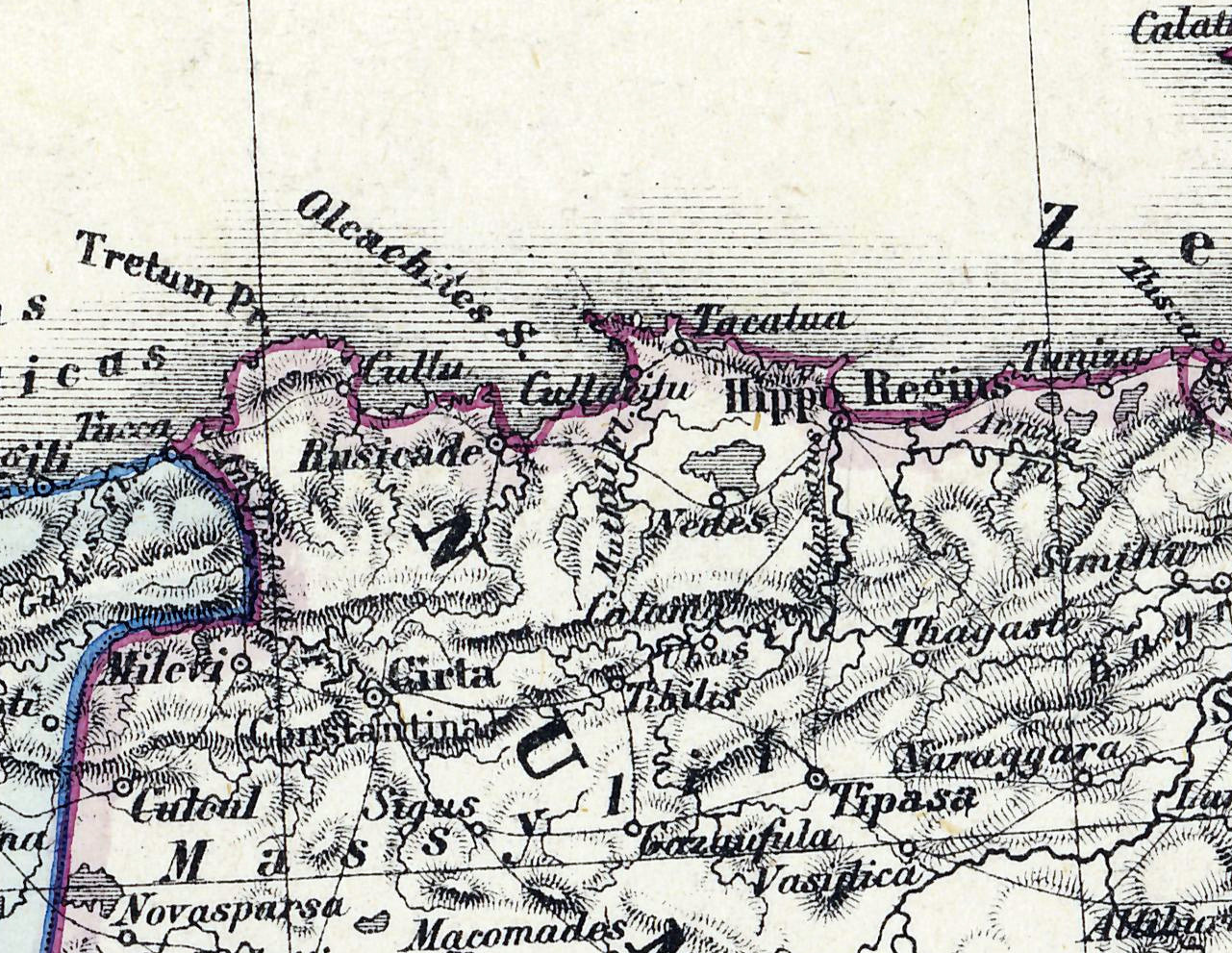
Region around Thiava

Thiava was an ancient Roman-Berber civitas in Numidia, Africa Proconsulare and in the Vandal Kingdom. It was a Latin Catholic diocese.

== History ==
It was located near Thagaste to the south of Hippo, in the high valley of the Medjerda, in the Roman province of Numidia. The site is near modern near Annaba and Souk-Ahras, in Algeria. It was noted from 300–640AD.

The town was seat of a bishopric under Hippo.

Thiava was notable for being almost completely Donatist (heretical) in its religion. It was the site of a conflict with the Catholic Archbishop of Carthage, the Church Father Saint Augustine.

The town became a center of the Donatist controversy when Donatus Magnus visited the town.

The city had been Donatist but was returned to the Catholic fold by Augustine in the 390s.

The first bishop of the town was Honoratus, a childhood friend of Augustine who had appointed him. Honoratus had been a monk at nearby Thagaste.

In 402, Honoratus died in Thiava. As he had been a monk at both Thagaste and Thiava and his personal assets were large, there arose a dispute between Thiava and Alypius of Thagaste It was becoming custom for monks to give their assets to the order where they became a monk and so Alypius felt the estate should go to his order.

Augustine eventually decided the matter in favor of Thiava but held that in future intestate estate of clergy be decided by the Roman civil law. This was an interesting outcome given his confections to Thagaste.

Christian rule ended in the 7th century with the spread of Islam.

== Titular see ==
The diocese was nominally restored in 1933 as a Latin Catholic titular bishopric under the names of Thiava (Latin), adjective Thiaven(sis)/ Tiava (Curiate Italian).

It has had the following incumbents, so far of the fitting Episcopal (lowest) rank :

- Ignace Ramarosandratana (1939.05.25 – 1955.09.14) as last Apostolic Vicar of Miarinarivo (Madagascar) (1939.05.25 – 1955.09.14), later (see) promoted first Bishop of Miarinarivo (1955.09.14 – death 1957.09.01)
- José Pedro da Silva (1956.07.30 – 1965.02.13) as Auxiliary Bishop of Patriarchate of Lisboa (Portugal) (1956.07.30 – 1965.02.13), later Bishop of Viseu (Portugal) (1965.02.13 – retired 1988.09.14), died 2000
- Eugène-Jean-Marie Polge (1965.05.19 – 1968.04.25) as Auxiliary Bishop of Archdiocese of Avignon (southern France) (1965.05.19 – 1968.04.25), next Titular Archbishop of Curubis (1968.04.25 – 1970.06.25) as Coadjutor Archbishop of Avignon (France) (1968.04.25 – 1970.06.25), succeeding as Metropolitan Archbishop of Avignon (1970.06.25 – retired 1978.04.25); died 1993
- Stephen Stanislaus Woznicki (1968.10.30 – death 1968.12.10) on emeritate, previously Titular Bishop of Peltæ (1937.12.13 – 1950.03.28) as Auxiliary Bishop of Archdiocese of Detroit (USA) (1937.12.13 – 1950.03.28) and Bishop of Saginaw (USA) (1950.03.28 – retired 1968.10.30)
- Dermot O'Mahony (1975.02.13 – death 2015.12.10) as Auxiliary Bishop of Archdiocese of Dublin (Ireland) (1975.02.13 – retired 1996.06.07) and on emeritate
- Hélio Pereira dos Santos (2016.04.27 – ...), as Auxiliary Bishop of Archdiocese of São Salvador da Bahia (Brazil), no previous prelature.

== See also ==
- List of Catholic dioceses in Algeria

== Sources and external links ==
- GCatholic
