= Francis Frederick Reh =

American prelate (1911–1994)

His Excellency, The Most Reverend Francis Frederick Reh
- Bishop of Saginaw; Titular Bishop of Macriana in Mauretania
- See: Diocese of Saginaw
- In office: December 11, 1968 – April 29, 1980
- Predecessor: Stephen Stanislaus Woznicki
- Successor: Kenneth Edward Untener
- Other posts: Bishop of Charleston (1962-1964); Rector, Pontifical North American College (1964–1968)

Orders
- Ordination: December 8, 1935 by Francesco Marchetti Selvaggiani
- Consecration: June 29, 1962 by Francis Joseph Spellman

Personal details
- Born: January 9, 1911 New York City, New York, U.S.
- Died: November 14, 1994 (aged 83) Saginaw, Michigan, U.S.
- Education: St. Joseph's Seminary and College; Pontifical Gregorian University
- Motto: Credam firmius (May I believe more strongly)

Francis Frederick Reh (January 9, 1911 – November 14, 1994) was an American prelate of the Roman Catholic Church. He served as bishop of the Diocese of Charleston in South Carolina from 1962 to 1964.

Reh previously served as rector of the Pontifical North American College in Rome from 1964 to 1968, and as bishop of the Diocese of Saginaw in Michigan from 1968 to 1980.

== Life and career ==
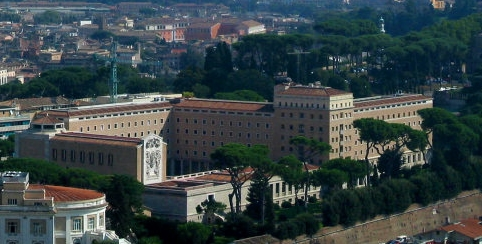
Pontifical North American College, Rome, Italy (2010)

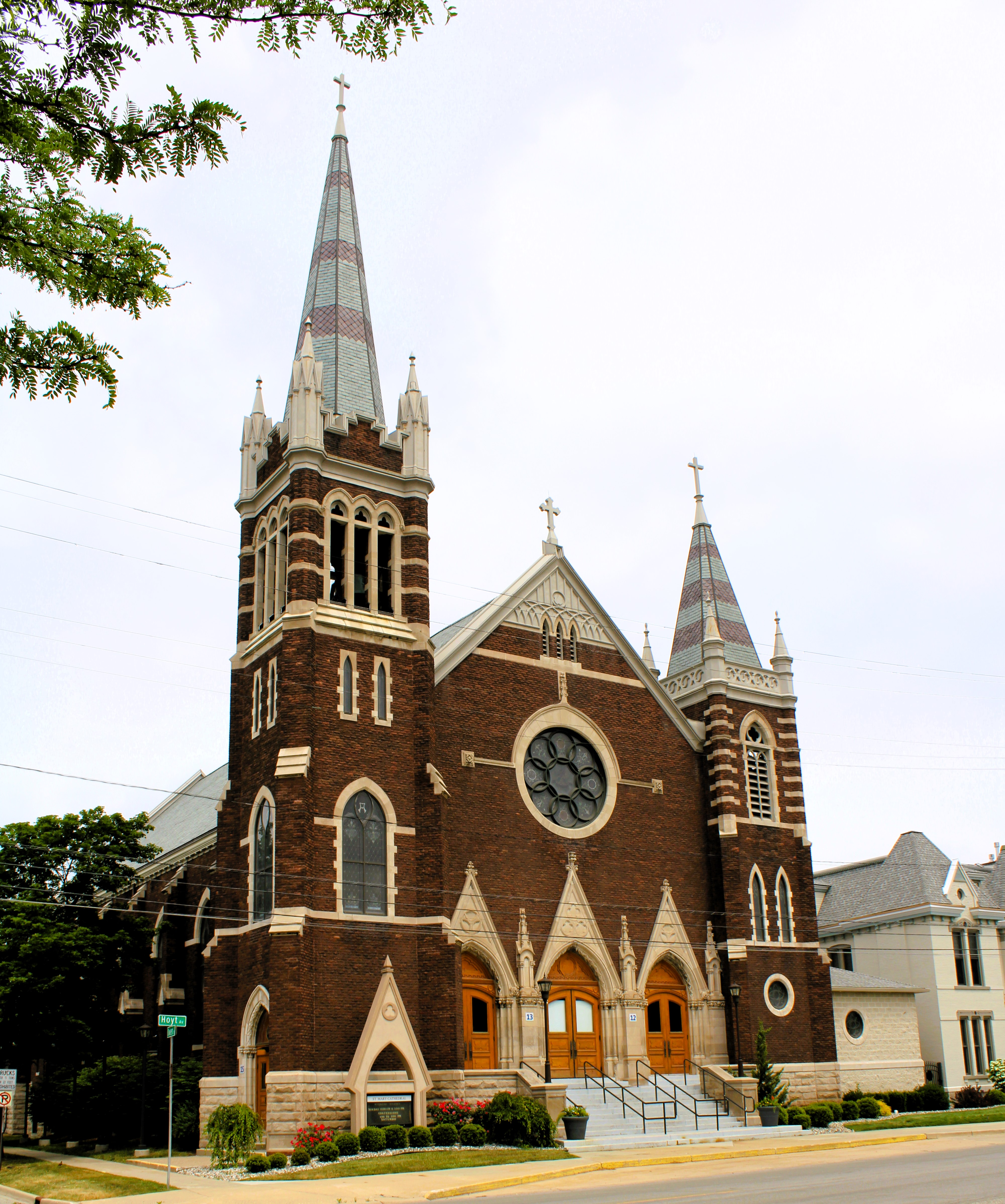
Cathedral of Mary of the Assumption, Saginaw, Michigan (2023)

=== Early life ===
One of two children, Francis Reh was born on January 9, 1911, in the Bronx, New York, to Gustave and Elizabeth (née Hartnagel) Reh. His father worked as a truant officer for the New York City Board of Education.

Reh attended the parochial school of Immaculate Conception Parish in the Bronx, then entered Cathedral College in Queens, New York, at age 13. After graduating from Cathedral College in 1930, Reh went to St Joseph's Seminary in Yonkers, New York, for two years. He then traveled to Rome to reside at the Pontifical North American College while attending the Pontifical Gregorian University.

=== Priesthood ===
Reh was ordained to the priesthood by Cardinal Francesco Selvaggiani in Rome at the North American College chapel for the Archdiocese of New York on December 8, 1935. He earned a Licentiate of Sacred Theology in 1936 and a Doctor of Canon Law degree summa cum laude in 1939 in Rome from the Pontifical Gregorian University.

After returning to New York City in 1939, Reh served as assistant chancellor of the archdiocese and associate pastor at St. Patrick's Cathedral Parish for two years. From 1941 to 1951, he was professor of moral theology and canon law at St Joseph's Seminary. He also served as defender of the bond on the archdiocesan tribunal. He became vice-chancellor in 1951.

In 1954, Reh was named a papal chamberlain by Pope Pius XII and vice-rector at the North American College in Rome. He returned to St. Joseph's Seminary in New York in 1958 as its rector. That same year, he accompanied Cardinal Francis Spellman to Rome for the papal conclave that elected Pope John XXIII.

=== Bishop of Charleston ===
On June 6, 1962, Reh was appointed the ninth bishop of Charleston by John XXIII. He received his episcopal consecration at St. Patrick's Cathedral in New York City on June 29, 1962, from Cardinal Spellman, with Archbishop John Maguire and Bishop John Fearns serving as co-consecrators. At his consecration, Reh wore the same vestments used by Spellman and Pius XII at their own consecrations.

Between 1962 and 1965, Reh attended all four sessions of the Second Vatican Council in Rome.

=== Rector of the North American College ===
On September 5, 1964, Reh was named to succeed Bishop Martin O'Connor as rector of the North American College. He was appointed titular bishop of Macriana in Mauretania on the same date.

=== Bishop of Saginaw ===
On December 11, 1968, Reh was appointed bishop of Saginaw by Pope Paul VI. As bishop, Reh instituted a formation program for lay people that was the first in the United States. He also supervised renovations to the Cathedral of Mary of the Assumption in Saginaw.

=== Retirement ===
On April 29, 1980, Pope John Paul II accepted Reh's resignation as bishop of Saginaw. He was succeeded by the Reverend Kenneth Untener. Reh died in Saginaw on October 14, 1994, at age 83.

== Notes ==
Catholic Church titles
Preceded by Stephen Stanislaus Woznicki	Bishop of Saginaw; 1968–1980	Succeeded by Kenneth Edward Untener
Preceded by Paul John Hallinan	Bishop of Charleston; 1962–1964	Succeeded by Ernest Leo Unterkoefler
Preceded by -	Titular Bishop of Macriana in Mauretania; 1964–1968	Succeeded by John Michael Sherlock
