= Robert James Carlson =

20th and 21st-century American Catholic bishop

His Excellency, The Most Reverend Robert James Carlson
- Archbishop Emeritus of St. Louis
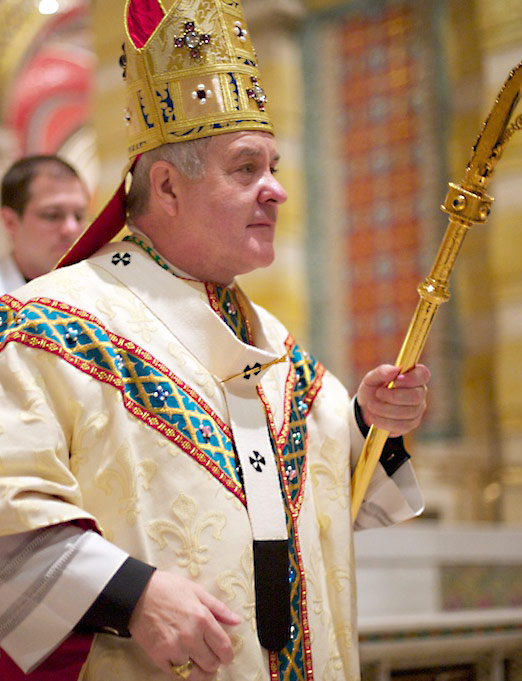
- Archbishop Carlson exits the Cathedral Basilica of Saint Louis – 2010.
- Church: Catholic
- See: Saint Louis
- Appointed: April 21, 2009
- Installed: June 10, 2009
- Retired: June 10, 2020
- Predecessor: Raymond Leo Burke
- Successor: Mitchell T. Rozanski
- Previous posts: Bishop of Saginaw (2004–2009); Bishop of Sioux Falls (1995–2004); Auxiliary Bishop of Saint Paul and Minneapolis (1983–1994)

Orders
- Ordination: May 23, 1970 by Leo Binz
- Consecration: January 11, 1984 by John Robert Roach, John Francis Kinney, and Paul Vincent Dudley

Personal details
- Born: June 30, 1944 (age 82) Minneapolis, Minnesota, US
- Education: Nazareth Hall Preparatory Seminary; Saint Paul Seminary; Catholic University of America School of Canon Law
- Motto: Ante crucem nihil defensionis (Before the cross, there is no defense)

Styles of Robert James Carlson
- Reference style: His Excellency; The Most Reverend
- Spoken style: Your Excellency
- Religious style: Archbishop

Robert James Carlson (born June 30, 1944) is an American prelate of the Catholic Church. He served as the ninth archbishop of the Roman Catholic Archdiocese of St. Louis in Missouri from 2009 to 2020.

Carlson previously served as an auxiliary bishop of the Archdiocese of St. Paul and Minneapolis in Minnesota (1983–1994), as bishop of the Diocese of Sioux Falls in South Dakota (1995–2004), and as bishop of the Diocese of Saginaw in Michigan (2004–2009).

== Biography ==
=== Early life ===
Robert Carlson was born June 30, 1944, in Minneapolis, to Robert and Jeanne Carlson. His father was serving in the U.S. Navy on a destroyer in Guam during World War II when his son was born. Robert senior worked as a Prudential insurance salesman for 43 years. The eldest of five children, Robert Carlson has four younger sisters, two of whom died in childhood. During high school, he studied under the Christian Brothers and played football. He then attended Nazareth Hall Preparatory Seminary in St. Paul and Saint Paul Seminary, where he obtained a Bachelor of Philosophy degree in 1966.

=== Priesthood ===
Carlson was ordained to the priesthood by Archbishop Leo Binz in St. Paul, Minnesota, for the Archdiocese of St. Paul and Minneapolis on May 23, 1970. He earned a Master of Divinity degree from St. Paul Seminary in 1976, and a Licentiate of Canon Law from the Catholic University of America School of Canon Law in 1979. He served as a pastor, a judge on the archdiocesan tribunal, director of the Office of Vocations, and chancellor of the curia in the archdiocese. He also served at the University of St. Thomas, where he was a chaplain to the hockey team.

=== Auxiliary Bishop of St. Paul and Minneapolis ===
On November 19, 1983, Pope John Paul II appointed Carlson as an auxiliary bishop of the Archdiocese of St. Paul and Minneapolis and titular bishop of Avioccala. He received his episcopal consecration on January 11, 1984, from Archbishop John Roach, with Bishops John Kinney and Paul Dudley serving as co-consecrators. Carlson selected as his episcopal motto: Ante Crucem Nihil Defensionis, that is, "Before the Cross There is No Defense."

In 1984, Carlson was informed of a sexual abuse accusation against Reverend Thomas Adamson. Four years earlier, Adamson had spent two weeks in an inpatient clinic after being accused of abuse of minors. Carlson confronted Adamson, who admitted committing sexual abuse against children and "agreed that it probably would be first-degree criminal sexual contact". In a memo to Archbishop Roach, Carlson recommended "given the seriousness of our exposure that the Archdiocese posture itself in such a way that any publicity will be minimized". Adamson later admitted to sexually abusing children in 10 of the 13 parishes to which he was assigned. When the Adamson case became public, Carlson defended his earlier actions, stating, "My job was to investigate and report back to the archbishop what I found out, and that's exactly what I did."

=== Coadjutor Bishop and Bishop of Sioux Falls ===
On January 13, 1994, John Paul II named Carlson as coadjutor bishop of Sioux Falls. He succeeded Bishop Paul Dudley as bishop when the latter retired on March 21, 1995. Carlson served as chairman of the United States Conference of Catholic Bishops (USCCB) Committee on Vocations from 1992 to 1994, and of the Subcommittee on Youth from 1993 to 1996.

While serving in Sioux Falls, Carlson offered to allow South Dakota's attorney general to inspect the diocese's files as part of his effort to demonstrate his open approach to sexual abuse accusations against priests. He required diocesan employees and priests transferring into his diocese to undergo thorough background checks.

Carlson survived stage-four bladder cancer in the 1990s, having once been told by his doctor to prepare for an imminent death. He has undergone a total of seven cancer-related procedures, and partly credited a trip to the Sanctuary of Our Lady of Fátima in Portugal for his recovery.

=== Bishop of Saginaw ===
Carlson was appointed as the fifth bishop of the Diocese of Saginaw on December 29, 2004. Succeeding Bishop Kenneth Untener, Carlson was installed at St. Mary's Cathedral in Saginaw on February 24, 2005. Carlson later said that upon arriving in the diocese, he reviewed the human resources file of every priest in the diocese as a proactive measure against sexual abuse. During his tenure in Saginaw, Carlson focused on priestly vocations, Catholic schools, service to the poor, stewardship, and evangelization. He also published six pastoral letters; created the Saginaw Area Catholic Schools system; and established two charities, the Bishop's Charity Golf Classic and the Bishop's Charity Ball.

Carlson filled the role of diocesan vocations director himself. In 2005 the number of seminarians increased from four to 12, and in 2006 the number of seminarians again increased to 19. In August 2006, the first permanent deacon in 25 years was ordained for the diocese. In June 2007, two men were ordained to the priesthood and five to the transitional diaconate.

=== Archbishop of St. Louis ===
Pope Benedict XVI named Carlson as the ninth Archbishop of the Archdiocese of St. Louis on April 21, 2009. He replaced Archbishop Raymond Burke, who was appointed Prefect of the Apostolic Signatura in the Roman Curia in June 2008. He received the pallium from the pope on June 29, 2009, in a ceremony at St. Peter's Basilica in Rome.

Soon after Carlson's arrival, the pastor of a St. Louis parish was arrested and suspended from priestly duties for alleged sexual improprieties with minors. Carlson visited and spoke to the parish soon afterward at one of their masses. He also notified the previous parishes where the priest had served of the allegations. He was praised for his response by the St. Louis Review, the newspaper of the Archdiocese of St. Louis.

In 2005, Carlson's predecessor, Archbishop Burke, had excommunicated Reverend Marek Bozek and the lay board of Saint Stanislaus Kostka Parish as part of a decades-long dispute over the control of parish property, the appointment of a Polish or Polish-speaking pastor to replace Bozek, Bozek's status and compensation, and whom to recognize as a parishioner or board member. Carlson, after trying to reconcile with the board and parishioners, concluded an agreement in which the archdiocese surrendered its property claims to the church and St. Stanislaus agreed not to claim any Catholic affiliation.

In response to the 2018 grand jury report concerning clerical sexual abuse in Pennsylvania, Carlson invited the Missouri attorney general's office to inspect the archdiocesan files and to produce a report on clerical abuse in Missouri.

=== Retirement ===
Pope Francis accepted Carlson's resignation as archbishop of St. Louis on June 10, 2020, and named Bishop Mitchell T. Rozanski as his successor.

== Views ==
Carlson is considered theologically conservative. His appointment follows a pattern observed by John L. Allen Jr., of Benedict XVI choosing prelates "who are basically conservative in both their politics and their theology, but also upbeat, pastoral figures given to dialogue."

=== Abortion ===
Regarding withholding communion to Catholic politicians who support abortion for women, and who persist in doing so even after consultation with their bishop, Carlson stated in 2010 that he has stressed the need for personal dialogue with them. However, he also affirmed the validity of denying communion to such politician as he said that

"If I were to enter into dialogue with somebody, and after they reflect on the discussion and that person persisted, it could come to that point. ...Archbishop Burke, who is on the Supreme Apostolic Signatura, has combined in an interesting way, and I think he does it correctly. And he's not just speaking anymore as the Archbishop of St. Louis, he is the prefect of the Signatura. It appears that's the direction the church consensus is moving towards. ... Could we get into that situation? Yes. But at least in my own time in St. Louis, I'd like to have a crack at the dialogue first."

During his tenure, Carlson was a frequent critic of U.S. Senator Tom Daschle (D-SD). In 1997, before a US Senate vote on legislation banning so-called partial-birth abortion, Carlson denounced a compromise proposed by Daschle that would ban the procedure, but allow exemptions for women claiming mental or physical health reasons. Carlson called the proposition a "smokescreen" designed to "provide cover for pro-abortion senators and President Clinton, who wanted to avoid a veto confrontation." In response, Daschle described the bishops as being "more identified with the radical right than with thoughtful religious leadership."

In 2003, Carlson privately urged Daschle to no longer identify himself as a Catholic because of his support for abortion rights for women. Daschle refused to disclose any details of his communication with Carlson, saying, "I am not going to participate in a debate that is intended to politicize anyone's religious beliefs..." Carlson later added, "I would never break off dialogue or a pastoral relationship with anyone."

During the 2008 U.S. presidential election, Carlson stated, "A Catholic can, in good conscience, vote for a pro-choice candidate only if other issues outweigh this one in number and in kind." The day following President Barack Obama's victory, he said, "This election has shown that any child who is born in America has the opportunity to ascend to the highest political office in the land. We must continue to work and pray tirelessly for the day when every child who is conceived will have the right to live."

On May 15, 2009, Carlson expressed his disappointment over the University of Notre Dame's decision to invite Obama to deliver its commencement speech and receive an honorary degree. Carlson said, "Notre Dame has to figure out who they are—are they of the culture, or are they of the Church?"

=== Girl Scouts ===
In February 2016, Carlson encouraged pastors to review their relationship with Girl Scouts of the USA, and their parent organization World Association of Girl Guides and Girl Scouts (WAGGGS). This was due to "a troubling pattern of behavior" in regards to Planned Parenthood and other advocates of abortion rights for women.

== Other Appointments ==
- Chairman of the USCCB Committee on Clergy, Religious, and Vocations
- Member of the USCCB Subcommittee on Youth and Young Adults
- Chairman of the USCCB Committee for Catholic Charismatic Renewal
- Member of the Canon Law Society of America in Washington, D.C.
- Board member for the Catholic Mutual Relief Society in Omaha, Nebraska
- Episcopal advisor for Cursillos in Christianity, Region VI
- Board member for the International Dominican Foundation in Metairie, Louisiana
- Board member for St. John Vianney Theological Seminary in Denver, Colorado
- President of the bishop's advisory board at the Institute of Priestly Formation in Omaha
- Past president and founder of the Catholic Youth Foundation USA in Washington, D.C.
- Episcopal advisor for Renewal Ministries, Ann Arbor, Michigan
- Episcopal board member for NET Ministries USA, St. Paul, Minnesota

== Publications ==
- The Liberating Power of this Sacrament, instruction on the sacrament of penance, Lent 2009
- Jesus Christ, the Prince of Peace, pastoral letter on peace, December 12, 2008
- 'Our witness must grow stronger', statement on the results of the November 4th general election, November 5, 2008
- Preparing for the Nov 4 General Election, On Abortion, Catholic Voters, and Proposal 2, October 28, 2008
- Body and Soul, A reflection for couples called to the vocation of marriage on the 40th anniversary of Humanae Vitae, July 25, 2008
- Jesus Christ, the Divine Physician, pastoral letter on penance, January 25, 2008
- Pastoral Letter on Evangelization, January 6, 2008

Catholic Church titles
Preceded by Raymond Leo Burke	Archbishop of Saint Louis; 2009–2020	Succeeded by Mitchell T. Rozanski
Preceded by Kenneth Edward Untener	Bishop of Saginaw; 2005–2009	Succeeded by Joseph R. Cistone
Preceded by Paul Vincent Dudley	Bishop of Sioux Falls; 1994–2005	Succeeded by Paul J. Swain
