= Peltae =

City and bishopric of ancient Phrygia

Peltae (Peltæ) or Peltai (Ancient Greek: Πέλται) was a city of ancient Phrygia in Asia Minor. Its location is unknown.

== History ==
Xenophon's Anabasis says that Peltae was 10 parasangs beyond Celaenae. The Ten Thousand stopped there for three days, during which games and sacrifices were performed. The Tabula Peutingeriana, where the name is erroneously written Pella, places it 26 miles from Apamea Cibotus, to the conventus of which Peltae belonged. Strabo mentions Peltae among the smaller towns of Phrygia, and the Notitiae Episcopatuum includes it as an episcopal cities of the Roman province of Phrygia Pacatiana Prima, a suffragan of its the archbishopric of Laodicea in Phrygia. The district in which the town was situated derived from it the name of the Peltaean plain (Πελτηνόν or Πελτινὸν πεδίον).

== Location ==
Peltae was probably located southwest of Eumeneia, but its site is debated.

== Titular see ==
The diocese was nominally restored in 1933 as the titular bishopric of Peltae/Peltenus (Latin) or Pelte (Curiate Italian).

As of 2026, its only holder has been Stephen Stanislaus Woznicki, from 1937 to 1950. It has been vacant since.
