= Joseph R. Cistone =

American prelate

His Excellency, The Most Reverend Joseph Robert Cistone
- Bishop of Saginaw; Titular Bishop of Casae Medianae
- See: Diocese of Saginaw
- Appointed: May 20, 2009
- Installed: July 28, 2009
- Term ended: October 16, 2018
- Predecessor: Robert James Carlson
- Successor: Robert Dwayne Gruss
- Previous post: Auxiliary Bishop of Philadelphia (2004–2009)

Orders
- Ordination: May 17, 1975 by John Krol
- Consecration: July 28, 2004 by Justin Francis Rigali, Robert P. Maginnis, and Michael Francis Burbidge

Personal details
- Born: May 18, 1949 Philadelphia, Pennsylvania, U.S.
- Died: October 16, 2018 (aged 69) Saginaw, Michigan, U.S.
- Education: St. Charles Borromeo Seminary
- Motto: Father of mercy and love

Styles of Joseph Robert Cistone
- Reference style: His Excellency; The Most Reverend
- Spoken style: Your Excellency
- Religious style: Bishop

Joseph Robert Cistone (May 18, 1949 – October 16, 2018) was an American prelate of the Roman Catholic Church who served as the sixth bishop of the Diocese of Saginaw in Michigan from 2009 to until his death in 2018.

== Biography ==
=== Early life and education ===
Cistone was born on May 18, 1949, in Philadelphia, Pennsylvania, to Daniel A. and Josephine R. (née Altomare) Cistone, Sr. One of three children, he has two brothers, Daniel and Anthony. He attended Our Lady of Consolation School and graduated from Father Judge High School, both in Philadelphia. After graduating from high school in 1967, Cistone entered St. Charles Borromeo Seminary in Wynnewood, Pennsylvania, receiving a Bachelor of Arts degree in philosophy in 1971 and a Master of Divinity degree in 1975.

=== Priesthood ===
Cistone was ordained to the priesthood at the Cathedral-Basilica of Sts. Peter and Paul in Philadelphia for the Archdiocese of Philadelphia by Cardinal John Krol on May 17, 1975. After his ordination, Cistone was posted as parochial vicar at Epiphany of Our Lord Parish in Philadelphia. He also became chaplain at St. Maria Goretti High School in Philadelphia in 1977. Cistone left these two posts in 1979 to became parochial vicar at St. Jerome Parish in Philadelphia. He was named in 1980 as an advocate on the metropolitan tribunal.

From 1982 to 1987, Cistone served as parochial vicar at St. Jude Parish in Chalfont, Pennsylvania, as a board member for the archdiocesan permanent diaconate program, and as chaplain of the Newman Center at Delaware Valley College of Science in Doylestown, Pennsylvania. He was also named defender of the bond on the metropolitan tribunal in 1983, then in 1987 became parochial vicar at St. Francis of Assisi Parish in Norristown, Pennsylvania. Cistone was moved from St. Francis in 1989 to St. Bernard Parish in Philadelphia. In 1991, Cistone left his other positions to become dean of formation for the Theology Division of St. Charles Seminary.

Cistone was named as an associate to Monsignor Edward Cullen, vicar for administration of the archdiocese in 1993. He later served as assistant vicar for administration from 1994 to 1998, and vicar general and vicar for administration from 1998 to 2009. Cistone was raised by the Vatican to the rank of honorary prelate of his holiness in 1998.

=== Auxiliary Bishop of Philadelphia ===
On June 28, 2004, Cistone was appointed as an auxiliary bishop of Philadelphia and titular bishop of Casae Medianae by Pope John Paul II. Cistone received his episcopal consecration on July 28, 2004, from Cardinal Justin Rigali, with Bishops Robert Maginnis and Michael Burbidge serving as co-consecrators, in Philadelphia at the Cathedral-Basilica of Sts. Peter and Paul. Cistone selected as his episcopal motto: "Father of mercy and love".

In addition to his duties as vicar general and vicar for administration, Cistone served as head of the Secretariat for Catholic Human Services and the Secretariat for Temporal Services. He also had pastoral oversight for parishes in South Philadelphia and a portion of Delaware County, Pennsylvania.

=== Bishop of Saginaw ===
Cistone was appointed as the sixth bishop of Saginaw by Pope Benedict XVI on May 20, 2009. Succeeding Bishop Robert J. Carlson, Cistone was installed on July 28, 2009. Within the United States Conference of Catholic Bishops (USCCB) Cistone was a member of the Committee for Protection of Children and Young People, the Committee for Cultural Diversity in the Church, the Subcommittee for African-American Affairs, and the Committee on Budget and Finance.

In 2011, Cistone appointed a 19-member commission to recommend parish closings. In 2013, Cistone announced that the diocese would reduced the number of parishes from 105 to 56. "I saw a need to position ourselves in a way by which parish communities are re-invigorated, liturgically alive and actively engaged in outreach to those in need." Many parishioners were angered by the closures, with some participating in protests. Several retired priests also opposed the closures. According to one priest, the diocese lost 5,000 parishioners between 2013 and 2015.

=== Death ===
Joseph Cistone died of lung cancer at his home in Saginaw on October 16, 2018, at age 69.

== Sexual abuse scandal ==
According to a 2005 grand jury investigation into clergy sexual abuse, while serving as assistant vicar for administration in 1996, Cistone was involved with silencing a nun who tried to alert parishioners at St. Gabriel parish about abuse by a priest.

A week after being named to lead the Diocese of Saginaw, Cistone was asked by a reporter about the grand jury investigation and his reported role in covering up instances of sexual abuse. Cistone expressed unhappiness with how little opportunity he had been given to respond to the report, saying, "Unfortunately, the grand jury procedure, as followed in Philadelphia, did not allow for any opportunity to address such questions to offer explanation or clarification."

Cistone also expressed surprise that he had not been questioned about the grand jury report during his introductory press conference and told the reporter, "Had it come up, I certainly would have addressed it." However, when given the opportunity to answer questions about his actions by the newspaper reporter, Cistone refused to answer specific questions on the matter.

In August 2012, Cistone was named in a lawsuit surrounding clergy sex abuse allegations at his former assignment in Philadelphia. Press reports indicate that he admitted that in 1994 he watched as Church records with the names of abusers were shredded.

=== Deland Case ===
On March 1, 2018, Cistone suspended Reverend Robert Deland, a pastor at St. Agnes Parish in Freeland, Michigan, from all of his priestly duties. Deland had been arrested by police on February 26, 2018, on charges of sexually assaulting a teenager.That same month, Saginaw police searched Cistone's residence for evidence in unspecified sexual abuse case. Prosecutors said they took this step due to a lack of cooperation from the diocese. Cistone said that he was unaware of the investigation. The police also searched the chancery office and the cathedral rectory.

In April 2018, Cistone appointed Michigan Judge Michael J. Talbot as an independent delegate to take charge of all sexual abuse cases in the diocese. In September 2018, Deland pleaded no contest to reduced charges; he was sent to state prison, spending two years there.

== See also ==
- Catholic Church hierarchy
- Catholic Church in the United States
- Historical list of the Catholic bishops of the United States
- List of Catholic bishops of the United States
- Lists of patriarchs, archbishops, and bishops
