= Kenneth Edward Untener =

American prelate (1937-2004)

His Excellency, The Most Reverend Kenneth Edward Untener
- Bishop of Saginaw
- Church: Roman Catholic
- Diocese: Saginaw
- Appointed: October 4, 1980
- In office: November 24, 1980 – March 27, 2004
- Predecessor: Francis Frederick Reh
- Successor: Robert James Carlson

Orders
- Ordination: June 1, 1963 by John Francis Dearden
- Consecration: November 24, 1980 by John Francis Dearden

Personal details
- Born: August 3, 1937 Detroit, Michigan, US
- Died: March 27, 2004 (aged 66) Saginaw, Michigan, US
- Education: St. John's Seminary; Pontifical Gregorian University
- Motto: That they may have life

Kenneth Edward Untener (August 3, 1937 – March 27, 2004) was an American prelate of the Catholic Church. He served as bishop of Saginaw in Michigan from 1980 until his death in 2004.

== Biography ==
=== Early life ===
Kenneth Untener was born in Detroit, Michigan, on August 3, 1937, the seventh of nine children. His family lived on Belle Isle, where his father worked for the recreation department. Kenneth Untener attended the Sacred Heart Seminary in Detroit, followed by St. John's Provincial Seminary in Plymouth, Michigan.

Untener played golf, ice hockey, and handball. In 1962, while playing handball, he broke his right leg. Due to complications from a genetic deformity to his ankle, doctors were forced to amputate his leg below the knee. Untener wore a prosthesis for the rest of his life. Untener took this view of the amputation,

“A deformed leg was socially awkward. A wooden leg is not. … You can kid about it. But the experience of my leg was most valuable to me. I think I know something of what it’s like to be the only woman in a room of men or the only black among whites. I know what it’s like to be noticed. I’ve been made sensitive to that.”

=== Ordination ===
Untener was ordained to the priesthood in Detroit for the Archdiocese of Detroit by Bishop John Dearden on June 1, 1963. After his ordination, Untener served in Detroit for a time, and then studied at the Pontifical Gregorian University in Rome, earning a doctorate. He returned to the United States, taught at Sacred Heart Seminary, and eventually became the rector of St. John's Provincial Seminary in Plymouth, Michigan in 1977.

=== Bishop of Saginaw ===
In 1980, Pope John Paul II appointed Untener as the fourth bishop of Saginaw. After his appointment, some people filed complaints with the Vatican about a recent workshop for seminarians on sexuality that Untener had authorized at St. John's Seminary. The claim was that the workshop promoted lewdness and promiscuity. Untener made two trips to the Vatican and an appeal to the pope. On the second trip, Cardinal John Francis Dearden accompanied Untener, publicly supporting him. Untener was consecrated bishop on November 24, 1980 at the Cathedral of the Most Blessed Sacrament in Detroit by Dearden. Untener later stated of the ordeal, "Having experienced that right away freed me of the burden of trying to be held in favor."

After his consecration, Untener sold the bishop's mansion in Saginaw. He then began a career-long practice of living for periods of time in the various rectories of the diocese with his priests. Untener also was made an honorary member of the Saginaw Gears hockey team in the early 1980s and took to the ice in a Gears jersey, but was unable to help the team win; he also played hockey regularly with friends for many years after becoming a bishop.

In 2000, Untener published the first Little Black Book. It followed lectio divina (divine reading) to help people spend time praying to God. He soon decided to write two new books for Easter (The Little White Book), and Advent/Christmas (The Little Blue Book).

In 1979, Untener wrote a homily for Dearden that included the poetic reflection, "We are prophets of a future not our own." Dearden delivered the homily at a mass for deceased priests that same year. The phrase later became associated with the life of Salvadoran Archbishop Oscar Romero, acquiring the title "the Romero Prayer". Pope Francis quoted this reflection verbatim in his remarks to the Roman Curia in December 2015.

==== Sex abuse scandal ====
In 2002, an Ohio man accused a priest in Saginaw of sexually molesting him as a minor during the 1980s. The priest was Reverend John Hammer, pastor of St. Mary's parish in Alma, Michigan. In the early 1980s, Hammer was serving in a parish in the Diocese of Youngstown in Ohio. After the accusations were made, he was removed from ministry and sent for treatment at a facility in Maryland for several years. In 1990, Hammer petitioned Untener for a transfer to the Diocese of Saginaw, admitting his guilt and asking for another chance.

Before accepting Hammer, Untener requested two medical opinions about his fitness to return to ministry. After receiving a positive report, Untener accepted the transfer, but partnered Hammer with a senior priest for observation. Hammer was assigned to Mount St. Joseph Parish in St. Louis, Michigan and then to St. Mary's. Untener did not notify either parish of Hammer's record. When the victim from Ohio came forward in 2002, Hammer admitted his guilt. The diocese removed Hammer from ministry and the Vatican later laicized him.

=== Death and legacy ===
Kenneth Untener died at age 66 from leukemia on March 27, 2004. His death shocked many people, as the diocese had only announced Unterer's leukemia diagnosis six weeks earlier. His funeral mass was celebrated in Saginaw; it included a homily by Archbishop John R. Quinn. Three years after Unterer's death, some of his reflections were published in a book, The Practical Prophet: Pastoral Writings.

== Views ==
=== Equality ===
Untener's career was marked by a consistent focus on egalitarianism in the church, ministry to the poor and participative liturgy. His liberal views often put him at odds with conservative Catholics and with the Vatican. He was regarded as being sensitive to the viewpoints of liberal Catholics. His overall view was that one should keep an open mind, consider the logic of one's actions and how they affect the church, and reflect openly over controversial issues. He frequently derided the Vatican for avoiding debate on real issues that potentially harmed the entire Church.

=== Diversity ===
Untener frequently observed that Jesus kept quite diverse company in his lifetime, including many people who were unwelcome in the synagogues of the time. Untener felt that modern Catholics should adopt this view in welcoming people into their own parishes. He was noted for his advocation of helping the poor, and his emphasis that needy people should be treated equally and not judged for their worthiness of help. He spoke out for women's rights in society and in the church, although never outright endorsing the ordination of women as priests.

=== Birth control ===
Some of the more controversial issues that Untener addressed were modern church attitudes toward birth control and abortion. He occasionally lamented that the church was moving toward "corporate severity" instead of a more accepting state of mind. He was an outspoken critic of the church's ban on artificial birth control. He collaborated on writing about abortion issues, and advocated for developing programs that openly addressed abortion issues faced by families. Some referred to his views as "ultra-liberal", while others argued that Untener simply liked to question things, even when doing so was difficult or controversial.

=== Liturgy ===
Untener also organized a series of preaching seminars for priests. At the 1993 National Conference of Bishops meeting, Untener reportedly interrupted the proceedings by commenting on how many people felt bored during mass. Untener told a reporter, "They were talking about the niceties of phrases – debating whether `prince' or `ruler' was a better word to use in the lectionary." Untener stood up and shouted, "The biggest problem is not whether we use `prince' or `ruler.' The biggest problem is the Mass is boring for most people." Untener encouraged priests to stick to one point in their homilies and to keep their talks at seven minutes or less.

Catholic Church titles
Preceded by Francis Frederick Reh	Bishop of Saginaw; 1980–2004	Succeeded by Robert J. Carlson
