= Stephen Stanislaus Woznicki =

American prelate

His Excellency, The Most Reverend Stephen Stanislaus Woznicki
- Bishop of Saginaw; Titular Bishop of Thiava
- Church: Roman Catholic
- See: Diocese of Saginaw
- Appointed: April 15, 1950
- Installed: May 24, 1950
- Term ended: October 30, 1968
- Predecessor: William Francis Murphy
- Successor: Francis Frederick Reh
- Other posts: Auxiliary Bishop of Detroit; 1937 to 1950

Orders
- Ordination: December 22, 1917 by James Trobec
- Consecration: January 25, 1938 by Edward Mooney

Personal details
- Born: August 17, 1894 Wilkes-Barre, Pennsylvania, US
- Died: December 10, 1968 (aged 74) Saginaw, Michigan, US
- Parents: Stephen and Michalina (née Jablonski) Woznicki
- Education: St. Paul Seminary
- Motto: Veritatem in caritate (Truth in charity)

Styles of Stephen Stanislaus Woznicki
- Reference style: The Most Reverend
- Spoken style: Your Excellency
- Religious style: Monsignor
- Posthumous style: none

Stephen Stanislaus Woznicki (August 17, 1894 – December 10, 1968) was an American prelate of the Roman Catholic Church. He served as bishop of the Diocese of Saginaw in Michigan from 1950 to 1968. He previously served as an auxiliary bishop of the Archdiocese of Detroit in Michigan from 1937 to 1950.

== Biography ==
=== Early life ===
Stephen Woznicki was born on August 17, 1894, in the Miners Mills section of Wilkes-Barre, Pennsylvania, to Stephen and Michalina (née Jablonski) Woznicki. He began his studies for the priesthood at SS. Cyril and Methodius Seminary in Orchard Lake, Michigan. He completed his studies at St. Paul Seminary in St. Paul, Minnesota.

=== Priesthood ===
On December 22, 1917, Woznicki was ordained a priest by Bishop James Trobec for the Archdiocese of Detroit at the Cathedral of St. Paul in St. Paul, Minnesota. After his ordination, Woznicki was assigned as a curate at St. Joseph Parish in Danville, Pennsylvania. After arriving in Detroit in 1919, he became as secretary to Bishop Michael Gallagher. The Vatican named Woznicki as a domestic prelate in 1926. Woznicki became pastor of St. Hyacinth, a Polish-language parish in Detroit, in December 1936. At St. Hyacinth, he appealed to parishioners to not anglicize their Polish surnames or move to the suburbs.

=== Auxiliary Bishop of Detroit ===
On December 13, 1937, Woznicki was appointed as an auxiliary bishop of Detroit and titular bishop of Peltae by Pope Pius XI. He received his episcopal consecration at the Cathedral of the Most Blessed Sacrament in Detroit on January 25, 1938, from Archbishop Edward Mooney, with Bishop Joseph C. Plagens and William J. Hafey serving as co-consecrators. Woznicki selected as his episcopal motto: Veritatem in caritate (Latin: "Truth in charity"). As an auxiliary bishop, he continued to serve as pastor of St. Hyacinth until 1950.

=== Bishop of Saginaw ===
Woznicki was appointed the second bishop of Saginaw by Pope Pius XII on April 15, 1950. His installation took place at St. Mary Cathedral in Saginaw, Michigan, on May 24, 1950. Known as a "great builder," Woznicki established 21 new parishes and missions, permitted the building of 30 schools, and led a nearly $4 million campaign to open the doors of St. Paul Seminary in Saginaw and the main diocesan offices. He served as president of the National Catholic Rural Life Conference from 1956 to 1957. He also attended the Second Vatican Council in Rome from 1962 to 1965.

=== Resignation and legacy ===
On October 30, 1968, Pope Paul VI accepted Woznicki's early retirement as bishop of Saginaw for health reasons; he was appointed titular bishop of Thiava on the same date. Stephen Woznicki died in Saginaw on December 10, 1968. at age 74.

Catholic Church titles
Preceded by William Francis Murphy	Bishop of Saginaw; 1950–1968	Succeeded by Francis Frederick Reh
