= Cathedral of Mary of the Assumption (Saginaw, Michigan) =

Historic church in Michigan, United States

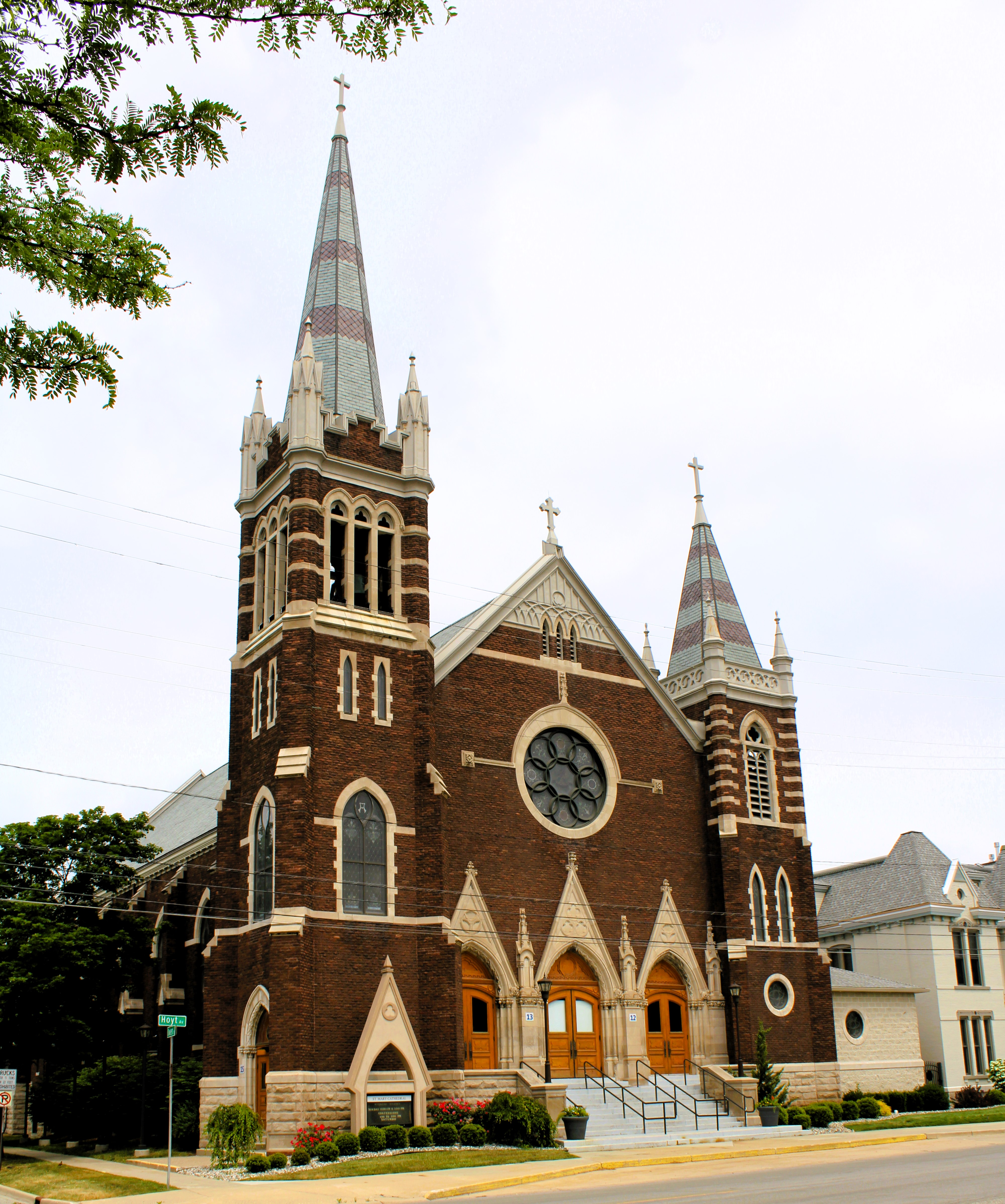
- Cathedral in 2023

- Location in Michigan Cathedral of Mary of the Assumption (the United States)
- 43°25′33″N 83°56′12″W
- Location: 615 Hoyt Ave. Saginaw, Michigan
- Country: United States
- Denomination: Roman Catholic Church
- Website: cathedralsaginaw.org

History
- Status: Cathedral/Parish church
- Founded: 1853
- Dedicated: July 23, 1903

Architecture
- Style: Gothic Revival
- Groundbreaking: 1901
- Completed: 1903

Specifications
- Capacity: 500
- Materials: Brick

Administration
- Diocese: Saginaw

Clergy
- Bishop: Most Rev. Robert D. Gruss
- Rector: Rev. Adam P. Maher
- Cathedral of Mary of the Assumption
- U.S. Historic district – Contributing property
- Part of: Saginaw Central City Historic Residential District (ID79001168)
- Added to NRHP: February 1, 1979

The Cathedral of Mary the Assumption, also known as St. Mary's Cathedral, is a Catholic cathedral and parish church located in Saginaw, Michigan, United States. It is the seat of the Diocese of Saginaw. In 1979 it was included as a contributing property in the Saginaw Central City Historic Residential District on the National Register of Historic Places.

== History ==
=== St. Mary’s Church ===
St. Mary's parish was founded in 1853 by the Rev. Henry J.H. Schutjes as a mission of St. Joseph parish in Bay City. The first church building was dedicated the same year and the second church building was built ten years later. St. Mary's became a parish in 1866 and the Rev. Francis T. Van der Bom was named the first pastor. In 1868 the parish's first school opened in a two-room schoolhouse. Four sisters from the congregation of the Sisters, Servants of the Immaculate Heart of Mary from Monroe taught in the school.

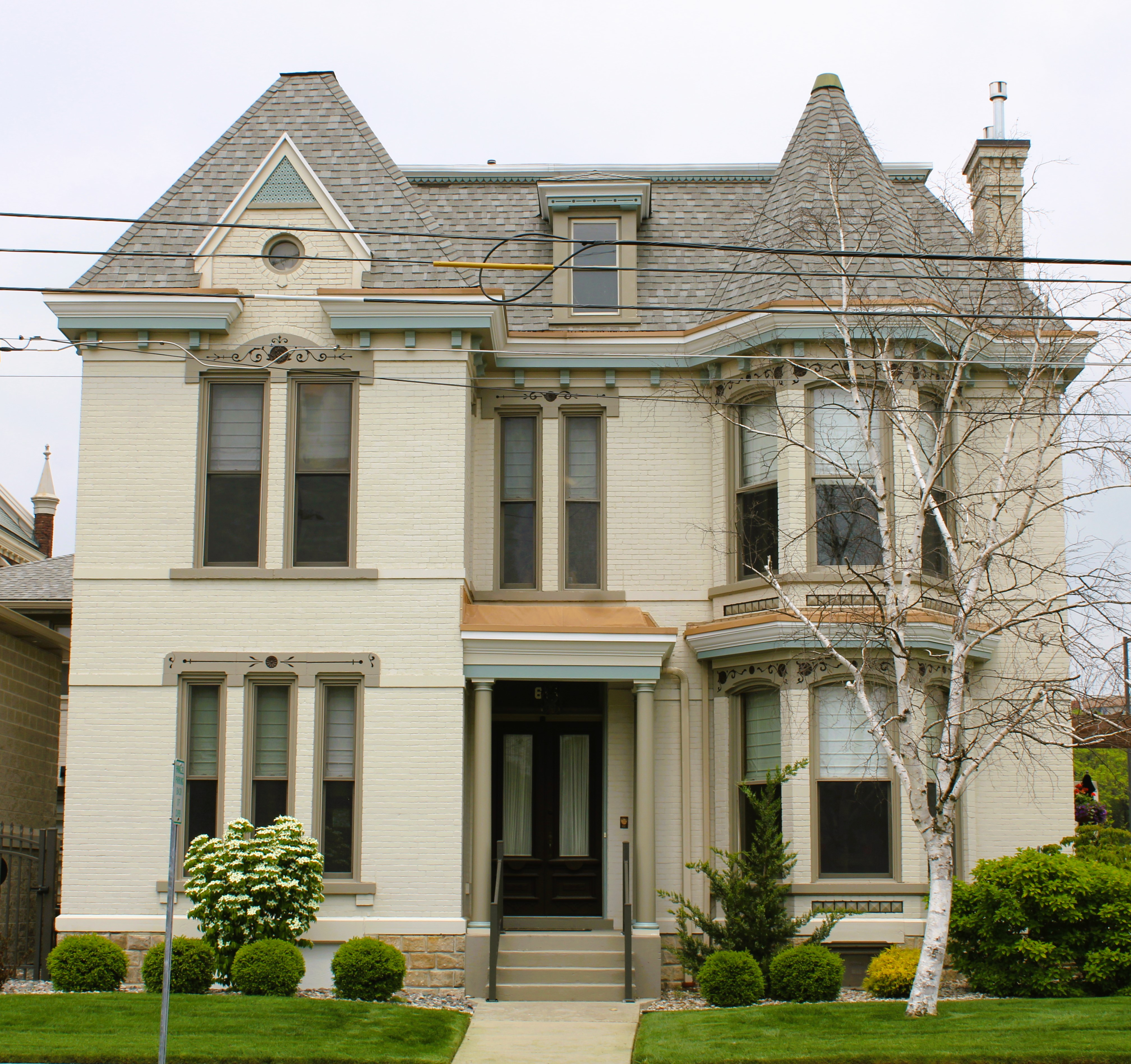
Rectory

St. Joseph Parish in Saginaw was founded from St. Mary's in 1873 and the German parishioners founded Sacred Heart the following year. Father Van der Bom and Dr. Benjamin B. Ross organized St. Mary's Hospital, which was staffed by four Daughters of Charity of St. Vincent de Paul, in 1874. Because the other two parishes took parishioners from St. Mary's the enrollment in the school dropped and the Immaculate Heart of Mary sisters left the parish in 1875. The two-story, brick, Châteauesque-style rectory was built the same year. The second parish school, named St. Mary Academy, was built in 1878. It was staffed by the Sisters of Providence of Saint Mary-of-the-Woods. In 1886 the Polish families of the parish established Holy Rosary Mission in East Saginaw. The French parishioners established Holy Family Parish in 1892.

Construction on the present church began in 1901 and it was completed in 1903. The third church building to house the parish was dedicated on July 23, 1903. The Sisters of Providence left St. Mary's Academy in 1907 and deeded the property to the Bishop of Grand Rapids. They were replaced by the Dominican Sisters from Grand Rapids. Our Lady of Mt. Carmel Parish was established in 1913 by 120 Italian families from the parish. A new school building was completed in 1920.

=== Cathedral ===
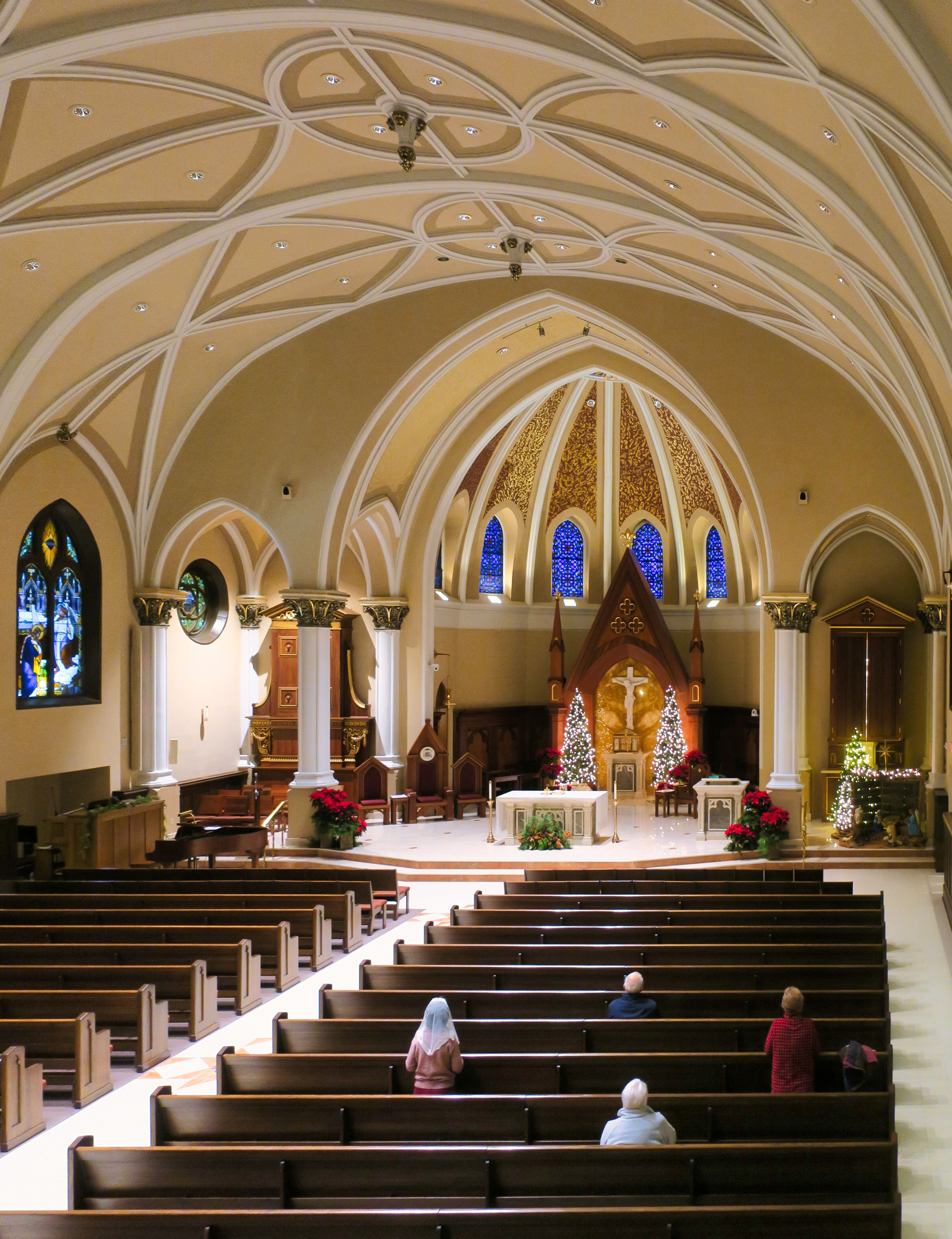
Interior during Christmas season.

St. Mary's Church became the cathedral of the Diocese of Saginaw when it was established by Pope Pius XI on February 26, 1938. In 1941 the cathedral was extensively renovated and a new altar, which replaced the altar that had been used in the second church, was placed in the church. A new two-story convent was built in 1956.

The cathedral was extensively renovated in 1978. The altar and the cathedra were moved to the main floor area of the church from the apse. A Blessed Sacrament chapel was created, movable chairs replaced the pews, the gallery was expanded, the organ and choir area were relocated, a new side entrance from the parking lot was created, and the interior was redecorated and painted. The cathedral was re-dedicated on June 1, 1978.

Because of declining enrollment and increased tuition, the East Side Catholic Schools system was created in 1982. Pre-schoolers through third-grade students attended St. Casimir School, fourth through sixth-grade students attend Our Lady Help of Christians School, and students in grades seven to 12 attended St. Mary Cathedral School. Two years later St. Mary Cathedral School merged with St. Stephen and Saints Peter and Paul high schools to create Nouvel Catholic Central High School. The former St. Mary Cathedral School building was sold in 1988. It was abandoned by its new owners two years later and became a source of blight.

A covered entrance and elevator were added to the side entrance, a new sound system was installed and necessary repairs were made to the interior and exterior of the cathedral in 2000. In January 2007 Bishop Robert J. Carlson formed a diocesan committee to study the possibility of renovating and renewing the Cathedral campus. Neighborhood Renewal Services helped the diocese purchase back the former cathedral school building in September of the same year. The following month the diocese bought the former convent from Holy Cross Children's Services, which was in the process of relocating. Renovations were completed on the former convent in February 2008. It houses the parish offices, the Cathedral Mental Health Clinic and Abortion Alternatives Inc. St. Dominic Chapel serves as a day chapel for the cathedral parish. The former St. Mary Cathedral School building was demolished in June 2008; a new roof was placed on the cathedral in the autumn of the same year.

The cathedral closed temporarily starting in February 2017 for an extensive renovation. Masses were held in St. Andrew's Church during its closure. The $4.7 million renovation included a re-configuration of the interior; a new marble altar, ambo, and baptismal font; new wooden cathedra and pews; and an addition that contains handicapped accessible restrooms. It has a seating capacity of about 500 people.

== Pipe organ ==
At the time of the 2017 renovation, the 1930 Kilgen pipe organ that was in St. Joseph's Church in Bay City, Michigan, was rebuilt in the cathedral by the Lauck Pipe Organ Co. of Otsego, Michigan. The organ had undergone major renovations in 1984 and in 2002. The instrument features 30 ranks of pipes for a total of about 1,800, two consoles with three manuals each, and a pedalboard.

== See also ==
- List of Catholic cathedrals in the United States
- List of cathedrals in the United States
