= William Murphy (bishop of Saginaw) =

American prelate

His Excellency, The Most Reverend William Francis Murphy
- Bishop of Saginaw
- Church: Roman Catholic Church
- See: Diocese of Saginaw
- In office: February 26, 1938 — February 7, 1950
- Predecessor: none
- Successor: Stephen Stanislaus Woznicki

Orders
- Ordination: June 13, 1908 by Pietro Respighi
- Consecration: May 17, 1938 by Edward Aloysius Mooney

Personal details
- Born: May 11, 1885 Kalamazoo, Michigan, US
- Died: February 7, 1950 (aged 64) Saginaw, Michigan, US
- Education: St. Jerome's University; Assumption College; College of Propaganda; Pontifical Roman Athenaeum Saint Apollinare
- Motto: Agenda ademple (To fulfill one's duties)

William Francis Murphy (May 11, 1885 – February 7, 1950) was an American Catholic prelate who served as the first bishop of Saginaw in Michigan from 1938 until his death in 1950.

== Biography ==
=== Early life ===
William Murphy was born on May 11, 1885, in Kalamazoo, Michigan, to William and Mary (née Gibson) Murphy. His parents were Irish immigrants who came to the United States from County Wexford. One of ten children, Murphy was the youngest child and only son; three of his sisters became nuns. He received his early education at the parochial school of St. Augustine's Parish and at Lefevre Institute, both in Kalamazoo.

Murphy then studied at St. Jerome's College in Kitchener, Ontario and at Assumption College in Sandwich, Ontario. Bishop John Foley then sent him to the Pontifical North American College in Rome so that he could attend the Urban College of Propaganda. Murphy earned a Doctor of Sacred Theology degree from the Urban College in 1908, and a Licentiate of Canon Law from the Pontifical Athenaeum S. Apollinare in 1909.

=== Priesthood ===
On June 13, 1908, Murphy was ordained to the priesthood for the Archdiocese of Detroit by Cardinal Pietro Respighi at the Basilica of St. John Lateran in Rome. He celebrated his first mass at the tomb of Saint Peter in St. Peter's Basilica.

After returning to Michigan in 1910, Murphy had the following parish assignments:

- Curate at St. Thomas in Ann Arbor (1910 – 1912)
- Curate at Holy Cross in Marine City (1912 – 1919)
- Curate at SS. Peter and Paul Cathedral in Detroit (1919 – 1921)
- Founding pastor of St. David in Detroit

In addition to his pastoral duties, Murphy served as master of ceremonies to Bishop Michael Gallagher. He was raised to the rank of a domestic prelate in July 1934. He also served as a member of the Michigan Historical Commission, and was awarded an honorary Doctor of Philosophy degree from the University of Detroit in 1930.

In August 1935, Murphy published a defense, based on canon law and precedent, of the political activities of Reverend Charles Coughlin. A diocesan priest, Coughlin had a national radio show that broadcast inflammatory political content, including antisemitic comments. In 1937, Archbishop Edward Mooney named Murphy as Coughlin's censor. Murphy served as intermediary between Mooney and Coughlin in negotiations about Coughlin's return to radio.

=== Bishop of Saginaw ===
On February 26, 1938, Murphy was appointed the first bishop of the newly erected Diocese of Saginaw by Pope Pius XI.He received his episcopal consecration on May 17, 1938, from Mooney, with Bishops John A. Duffy and Joseph C. Plagens serving as co-consecrators, at the Cathedral of the Most Blessed Sacrament in Detroit, Michigan. Murphy selected as his episcopal motto: Agenda ademple (Latin: "To Fulfill One's Duties").

During his administration, Murphy established offices of Catholic Charities in the Michigan towns of Saginaw, Bay City, Alpena, and Bad Axe, and promoted social and charitable work among the poor. He organized the Mexican Apostolate to minister to Catholic migrant workers, and encouraged drives for money, food, and clothing for World War II victims in Europe. During one Christmas message, Murphy said, "Christ began His mission of saving and redeeming the human race by being born in the squalor of a stable. He ennobled poverty."Murphy was a close friend of poet Edgar Guest with whom he often golfed and fished. Guest wrote of Murphy:

"A bishop, bass upon his hook,

Rod bent and taut line swishing,

Without his robe and shepherd's crook

Is just a man out fishing."

=== Death and legacy ===
William Murphy died after a long illness at home in Saginaw on February 7, 1950, at age 64.

Catholic Church titles
Preceded by None (diocese erected)	Bishop of Saginaw; 1938–1950	Succeeded by Stephen Stanislaus Woznicki
