= National Association of Priest Pilots =

Catholic evangelistic organization

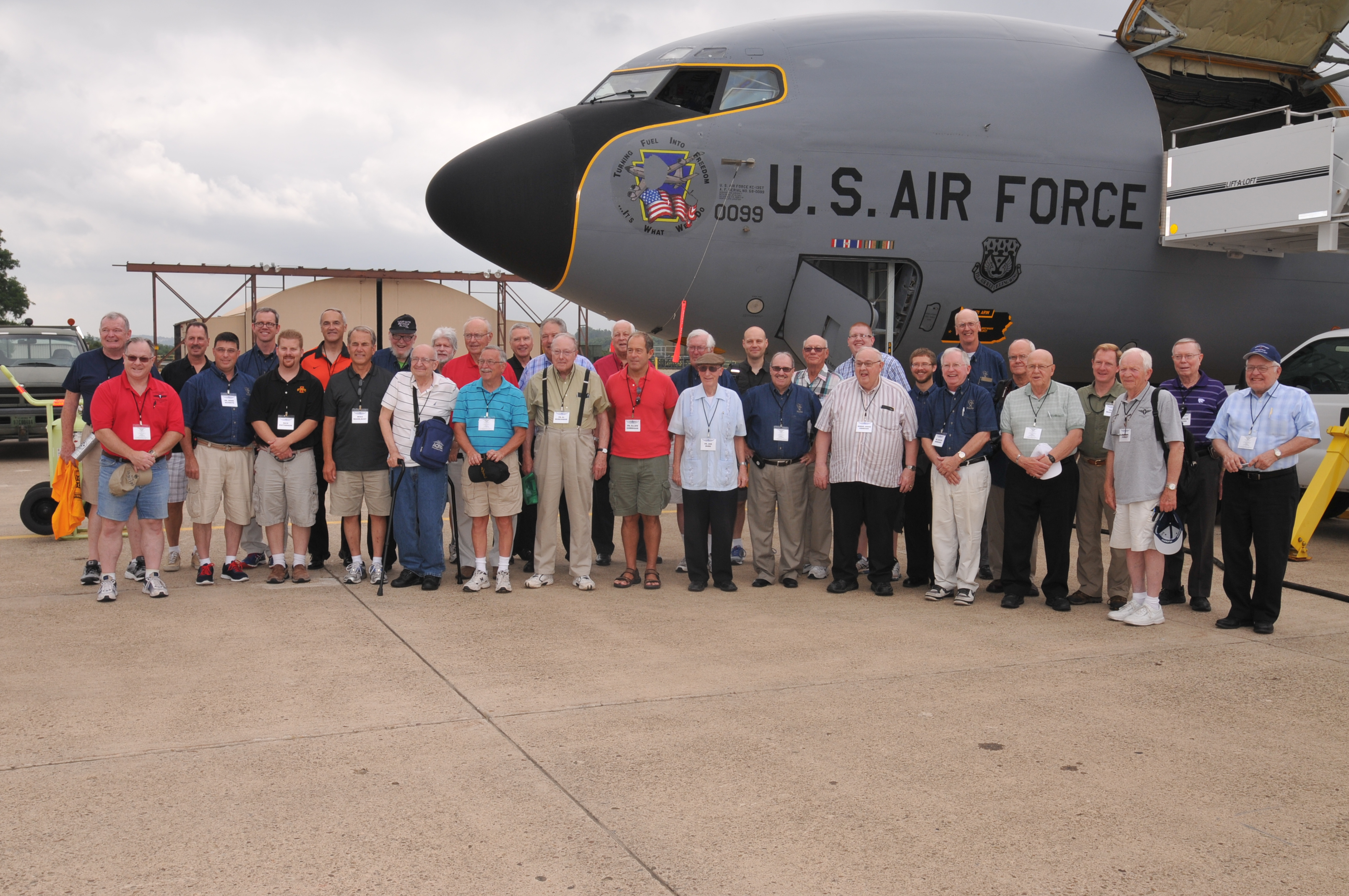
- Members of the NAPP tour the 171st Air Refueling Wing in 2016
- Abbreviation: NAPP
- Nickname: Flying Padres
- Formation: July 15, 1964; 62 years ago
- Members: 120 (2025)
- Website: priestpilots.org

The National Association of Priest Pilots, or the Flying Padres, is a group of Catholic clergy promoting aviation for the purposes of evangelization.

== History ==
The National Association of Priest Pilots was founded on July 15, 1964, sponsored by Richard Henry Ackerman, bishop of the Diocese of Covington. The purpose of the organization as advertised at its founding is "to promote the use of private aircraft as a practical, safe, and efficient tool in the apostolic work of the priest". Abbot Charles Coriston of St. Paul's Abbey was the first president. The first meeting was held in Maysville, Kentucky, and gathered 60 priests. Pope Paul VI bestowed his apostolic blessing on the group in September 1964, and by March 1965, the group counted 300 members from 39 American states and 12 other countries.

While the group still promotes the usage of aviation for evangelization in places like the Diocese of Fairbanks, Alaska, in recent years the group has pivoted to mainly having a hobbyist focus due to dwindling membership.

Full membership may be obtained by Catholic priests or deacons with an FAA rating. Associate memberships are available to anyone interested in furthering the objectives of the association. Some priest members have previously served in the United States Air Force. In 2009, the group had 150 members, 20 of whom were not priests. The 50th annual convention in 2014 was held in Rapid City and was hosted by Robert D. Gruss, bishop of the Diocese of Rapid City and former commercial pilot. The group had 120 members in 2025.

== See also ==
- Mission Aviation Fellowship
