= Robert D. Gruss =

American Catholic prelate (born 1955)

His Excellency, The Most Reverend Robert D. Gruss
- Bishop of Saginaw
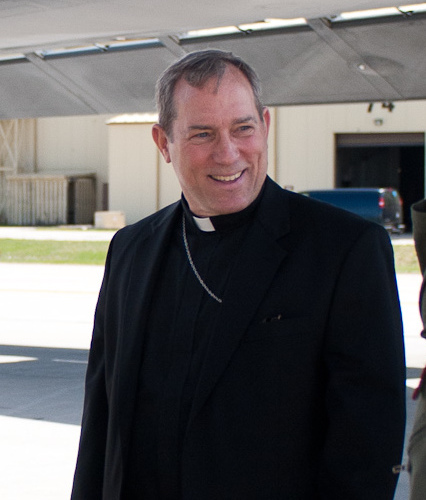
- Gruss in 2012 at Ellsworth Air Force Base
- Church: Catholic
- Diocese: Saginaw
- Appointed: May 24, 2019
- Installed: July 26, 2019
- Predecessor: Joseph R. Cistone
- Previous posts: Bishop of Rapid City (2011-2019); Vice-Rector, Pontifical North American College (2007–2010)

Orders
- Ordination: July 2, 1994 by William Edwin Franklin
- Consecration: July 28, 2011 by John Clayton Nienstedt, Martin John Amos, Samuel J. Aquila

Personal details
- Born: June 25, 1955 (age 71) Texarkana, Arkansas, US
- Education: St. Ambrose University; Pontifical University of Saint Thomas Aquinas
- Motto: No greater love
- Styles
- Reference style: His Excellency; The Most Reverend
- Spoken style: Your Excellency
- Religious style: Bishop

Robert Dwayne Gruss (born June 25, 1955) is an American Catholic prelate serving as Bishop of Saginaw since 2019. He previously served as Bishop of Rapid City from 2011 to 2019.

== Biography ==
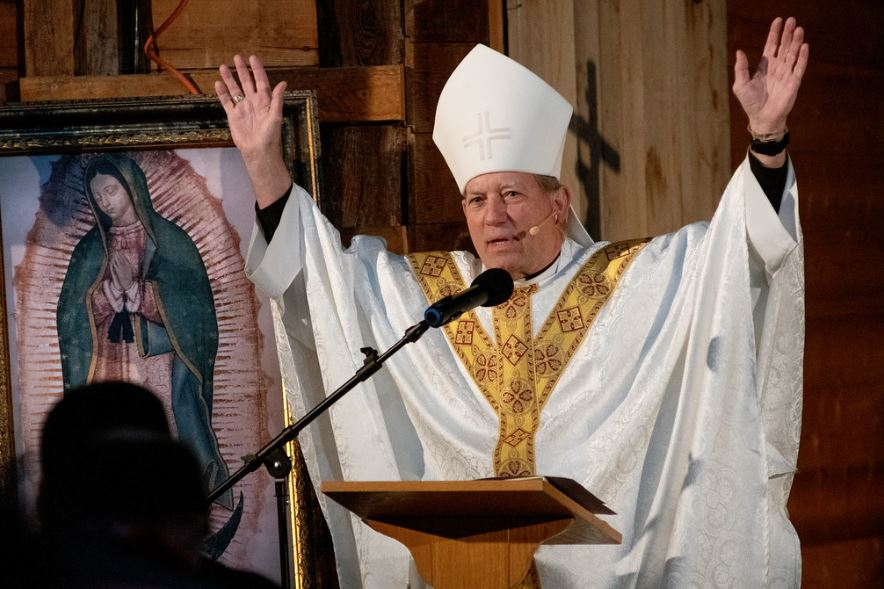
Bishop Gruss celebrates Mass for Rural Life at the Octagon Barn in Gagetown, Michigan (2023)

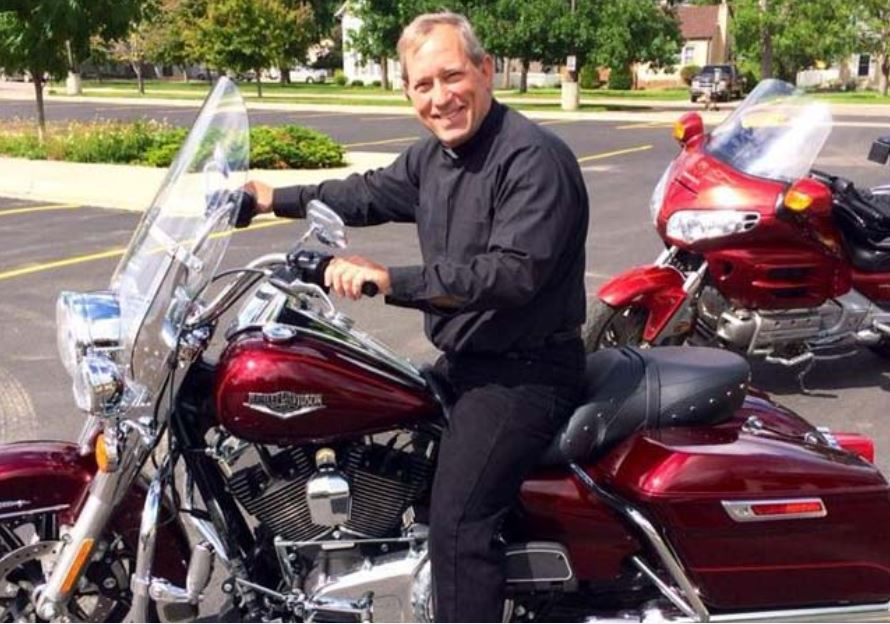
Bishop Gruss leaves Cathedral of St. Mary of the Assumption for a charity ride for Think Adoption Not Abortion (2022)

=== Early life ===
Gruss was born in Texarkana, Arkansas on June 25, 1955. He attended Madison Area Technical College in Madison, Wisconsin, earning an associate degree. Gruss then received his commercial pilot license from the Spartan School of Aeronautics in Tulsa, Oklahoma. He worked as a flight instructor and commercial airline pilot from 1980 to 1989. He is a member of the National Association of Priest Pilots.

After deciding to enter the priesthood, Gruss enrolled at St. Ambrose University in Davenport, Iowa, where he earned a Bachelor of Theology degree in 1990. He traveled to Rome to attend the Pontifical University of Saint Thomas Aquinas, where he earned a Bachelor of Sacred Theology degree in 1993 and a Master's in Spiritual Theology degree in 1994.

=== Priesthood ===
After returning to Iowa, Gruss was ordained a priest for the Diocese of Davenport by Bishop William Franklin at Sacred Heart Cathedral in Davenport on July 2, 1994.

After his 1994 ordination, the diocese assigned Gruss as parochial vicar of St. Paul the Apostle Parish in Davenport, Iowa. He served the same role for three parishes in central Iowa from 1997 to 1998;

- St. Anthony in Knoxville
- Sacred Heart in Melcher
- St. Mary in Pella. He was appointed pastor at St. Mary in 1999.

Bishop William Franklin appointed Gruss as vocations director in 2004 and chancellor in 2005. Pope Benedict XVI named him a chaplain of his holiness, with the title of monsignor, in August 2007.Gruss returned to Rome in 2007 to serve as vice-rector of the Pontifical North American College. Back in Iowa in 2010, he was assigned as pastor and rector of Sacred Heart Cathedral.

=== Bishop of Rapid City ===
Gruss was named the bishop of Rapid City by Benedict XVI on May 26, 2011. His episcopal consecration took place on July 28, 2011, at the Rushmore Plaza Civic Center in Rapid City, South Dakota. Archbishop John Nienstedt was the consecrating bishop, and Bishops Martin Amos and Samuel Aquila were the co-consecrators. In 2017, Gruss opened the cause for the canonization of Lakota medicine man Nicholas Black Elk.

=== Bishop of Saginaw ===
Gruss was named Bishop of Saginaw by Pope Francis on May 24, 2019. Gruss was installed on July 26, 2019. In remarks to the media, Gruss made this statement about sexual abuse by priests:

“There is no place in the church for sexual abuse of minors or anyone else, My desire is that the Church becomes holy in the way that Christ calls her to be, and those who abuse their power and authority are held to accountability.”

In an appearance on Cause for Joy, a diocesan podcast, Gruss revealed his hobbies of riding "horses and Harleys".

== See also ==
- Catholic Church hierarchy
- Catholic Church in the United States
- Historical list of the Catholic bishops of the United States
- List of Catholic bishops of the United States
- Lists of patriarchs, archbishops, and bishops

Catholic Church titles
Preceded by Joseph R. Cistone	Bishop of Saginaw; 2019–present	Succeeded by Incumbent
Preceded by Blase J. Cupich	Bishop of Rapid City; 2011–2019	Succeeded by Peter Michael Muhich
