= Diocese of Saginaw =

Ecclesiastical jurisdiction in Michigan

Coordinates: 43°25′31″N 83°56′12″W

Diocese of Saginaw Dioecesis Saginavensis
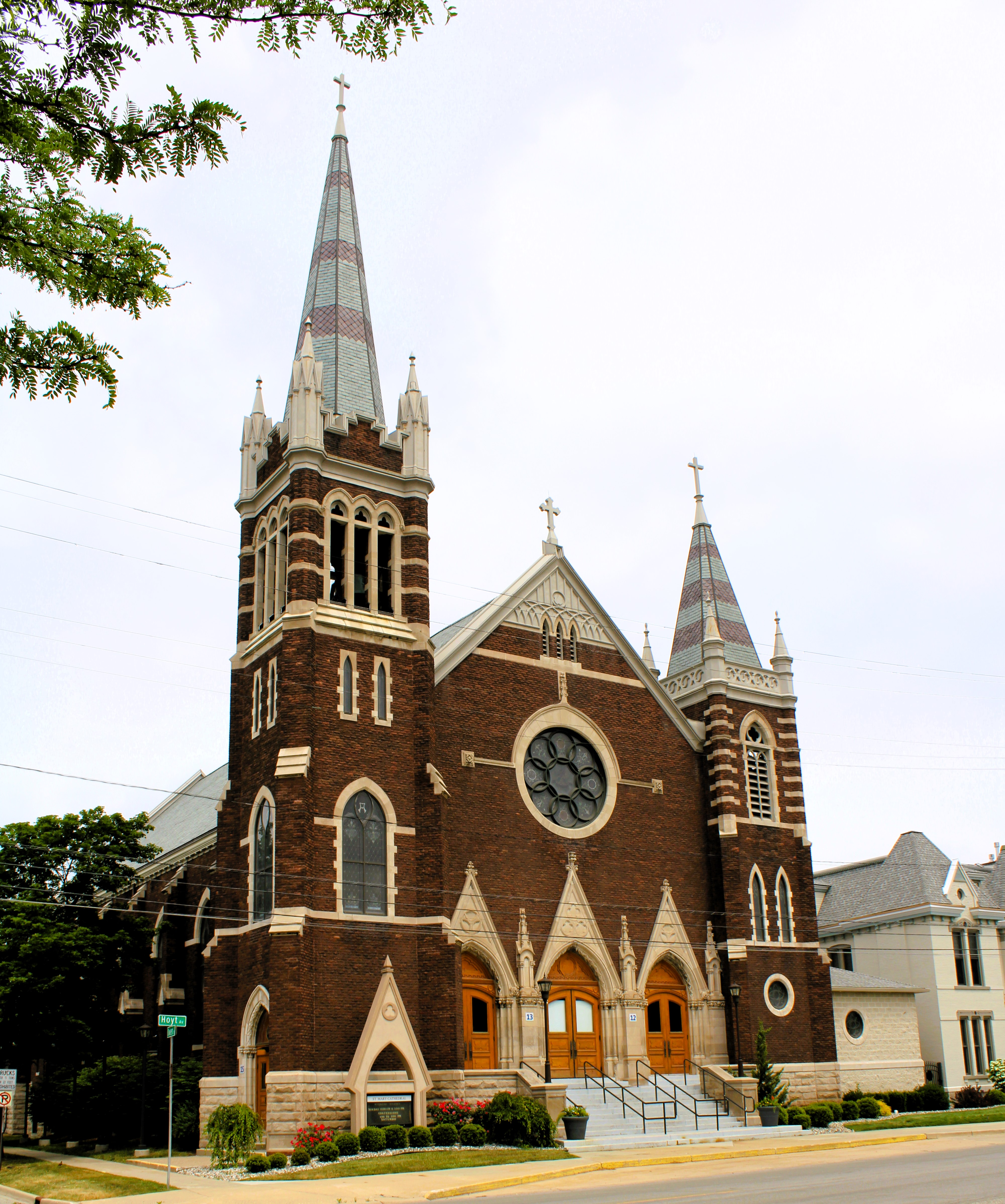
- Cathedral of Mary of the Assumption

- Coat of arms

Location
- Country: United States
- Territory: Counties of Arenac, Bay, Clare, Gladwin, Gratiot, Huron, Isabella, Midland, Saginaw, Sanilac and Tuscola.
- Ecclesiastical province: Detroit

Statistics
- Area: 6,955 sq mi (18,010 km^{2})
- Population: Total; Catholics: (as of 2017); 804,885; 153,260 (19%)
- Parishes: 56

Information
- Denomination: Catholic
- Sui iuris church: Latin Church
- Rite: Roman Rite
- Established: February 26, 1938 (88 years ago)
- Cathedral: Cathedral of Mary of the Assumption

Current leadership
- Pope: Leo XIV
- Bishop: Robert Dwayne Gruss
- Metropolitan Archbishop: Edward Weisenburger

Map
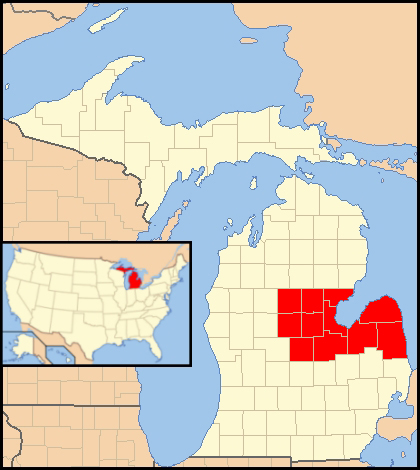

Website
- saginaw.org

Bishop of Saginaw
- Bishopric

catholic
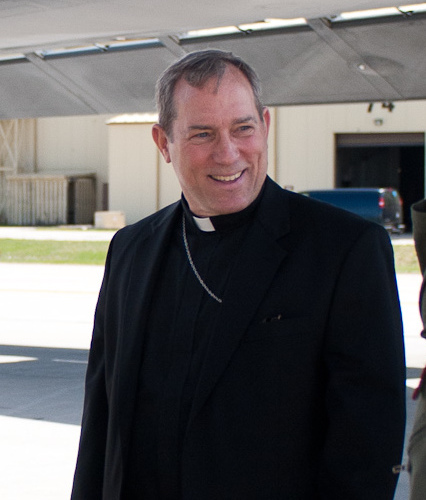
- Incumbent; Robert Dwayne Gruss

Location
- Ecclesiastical province: Archdiocese of Detroit

Information
- First holder: William Francis Murphy
- Established: 1938
- Diocese: Diocese of Saginaw
- Cathedral: Cathedral of Mary of the Assumption (Saginaw, Michigan)

Website
- http://www.saginaw.org

The Diocese of Saginaw (Latin: Dioecesis Saginavensis) is a diocese of the Catholic Church in Michigan in the United States. Founded in 1938, it is a suffragan diocese of the Archdiocese of Detroit. The mother church of the diocese is Cathedral of Mary of the Assumption in Saginaw.

== Geography ==
The Saginaw Diocese is located in Central Michigan and The Thumb and consists of eleven counties, covering 6,955 square miles (18,010 km^{2}). The population is roughly an even split between urban and rural. The three major urban centers are Saginaw, Bay City, and Midland.

== History ==
=== 1700 to 1930 ===
During the 17th century, present-day Michigan was part of the French colony of New France. The Diocese of Quebec had jurisdiction over the region. In 1763, the Michigan area became part of the British Province of Quebec, forbidden from settlement by American colonists. After the American Revolution, the Michigan region became part of the new United States. For Catholics, Michigan was now under the jurisdiction of the Archdiocese of Baltimore, which then comprised the entire country.

In 1808, Pope Pius VII erected the Diocese of Bardstown in Kentucky, with jurisdiction over the new Michigan Territory. In 1821, the pope erected the Diocese of Cincinnati, taking the Michigan Territory from the Diocese of Bardstown.

The first Catholic church in the Saginaw Valley was St. Joseph, dedicated in 1850 in Bay City. St. Mary's Parish in Saginaw, the first in that community, was established in 1853 as a mission of St. Joseph.

Catholic and civic leaders in Saginaw decided in 1874 that the town needed a hospital to serve the workers in the local lumber industry. A group of the Sisters of Charity of St. Vincent de Paul came from Emmittsville, Maryland to open St. Mary's Hospital that year. It was at that time the only hospital in Michigan north of Detroit.Today it is MyMichigan Medical Center Saginaw.

=== 1900 to 1970 ===
Pope Pius XI formed the Diocese of Saginaw in 1938 out of 16 Michigan counties that he separated from the Diocese of Grand Rapids and the Archdiocese of Detroit. The pope appointed William F. Murphy from Detroit as the first bishop of Saginaw.

The 1938 P.J. Kenedy Official Catholic Directory notes that the new diocese had a Catholic population of 77,705, with 81 parishes, 31 missions, 112 priests, 41 parishes with schools (of which 17 were high schools), two hospitals, a children's home and a residence for working girls.

After Murphy died in 1950, Auxiliary Bishop Stephen S. Woznicki from Detroit was made bishop of Saginaw that same year.Woznicki in 1960 opened St. Paul Seminary in Saginaw, a minor seminary offering four years of high school and two years of college. It was intended for boys interested in the priesthood.

Woznicki died in 1968. Pope Paul VI replaced him that same year with Bishop Francis Reh, previously rector of the Pontifical North American College in Rome.

=== 1970 to 2000 ===
St Paul Seminary was closed in 1970. As bishop Reh began to implement changes in the diocese that were mandated by the Second Vatican Council of the early 1960s. A new tenure policy limited priests' assignments to nine years. The former four-deanery division of the diocese was multiplied into 12 vicariates. In 1975, the Cathedral of St. Mary was renovated. Reh opened a liturgy office, a finance board, a Latin American affairs department, a Black Catholic concerns department, and a human services council.

In 1971, Paul VI erected the Diocese of Gaylord,, taking the northern part of the Diocese of Saginaw. Although Clare County and Isabella County were added to the Diocese of Saginaw territory, the re-alignment reduced the diocese from 16 to 11 counties.

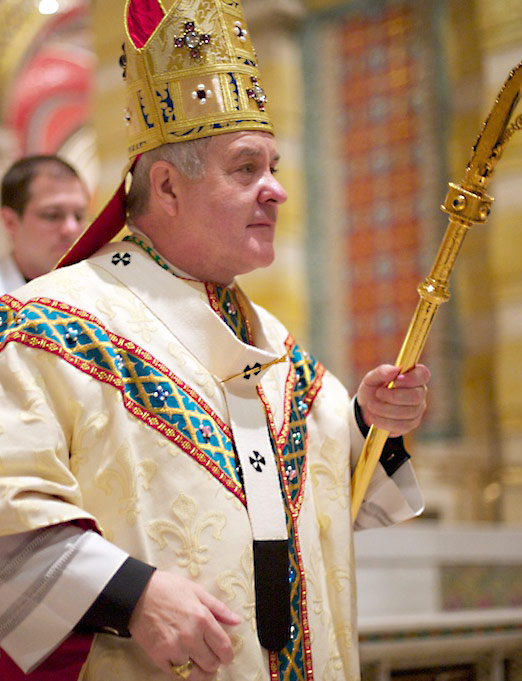
Archbishop Carlson (2010)

After Reh retired as bishop of Saginaw in 1980, Kenneth E. Untener, rector of St. John's Provincial Seminary in Plymouth, became the fourth bishop of Saginaw. In 1982, Untener initiated a Come Home program to invite alienated Catholics back to the church. He also worked to re-establish the traditional practices of Lent. In the 1990s, Unterner established a commission for women, a diocesan Office for Stewardship and Development and a Catholic Schools Foundation. He also opened the Center for Ministry, a conference center in Saginaw.

=== 2000 to 2010 ===
Untener died of leukemia in 2004.In 2004, John Paul II appointed Bishop Robert J. Carlson of the Diocese of Sioux Falls as the fifth bishop of Saginaw. Carlson emphasized vocations, liturgical renewal, and evangelization within the diocese. The number of seminarians increased from four in 2004 to 12 in 2005, and to 19 in 2006. Carlson ordained the first permanent deacon in the diocese in over 25 years in 200., Two men were ordained to the transitional diaconate that same year. The diocese also implemented a series of Saint Andrew dinners to invite young men to an informal meal and discussion on vocations.

In 2007 the diocese began an evangelization initiative to reach out to all families in the diocese through the Faith Saginaw magazine. A group of 230 people took part in the March for Life in Washington, D.C.Carlson was named archbishop of the Archdiocese of St. Louis in 2009.

In 2009, Auxiliary Bishop Joseph Cistone, of the Archdiocese of Philadelphia, was appointed by Pope Benedict XVI to Saginaw to be its new bishop.

=== 2010 to present ===
In March 2018, Saginaw police executed a search warrant at Cistone's residence along with the chancery and cathedral rectory. They had been dissatisfied with the cooperation they had been receiving from Cistone in the investigation of sexual abuse allegations against Robert DeLand. Cistone served until his death from lung cancer in 2018. Bishop Robert Gruss of the Diocese of Rapid City was named by Pope Francis in 2019 to succeed Cistone.

Early in 2020, as a result of the COVID-19 pandemic, Gruss suspended mass throughout the diocese. By the summer of 2021, the diocese permitted parishioners who had received COVID-19 vaccination to attend mass without masks.

A controversy arose in April 2024 at St. Joseph the Worker Parish in Beal City after the author Dominic Thrasher gave a reading to the pre-kindergarten class at the parish school. An openly gay man, Thrasher read a book about his family dogs to the children. Local activists demanded the removal of the pastor, Thomas Held, who had no prior knowledge of the reading. Held resigned his post a few weeks later. That same month, Gruss apologized for a statement in which he called US President Joe Biden "stupid".

=== Sex abuse ===
Megan Winans, a Central Michigan University student, sued the Diocese of Saginaw in February 2016. She claimed that Denis Heames had misused counseling sessions to draw her into a sexual relationship. Heames was parochial administrator at St. Mary University Parish in Mount Pleasant until the diocese removed him in July 2015 for "boundary violations". Soon after Winans filed her lawsuit, the diocese verified that Heames had sexually harassed her.

Robert DeLand was indicted on criminal sexual conduct in March 2018 by a 17-year-old and a 21-year-old. The two accusers said that the priest showed them pornography and inappropriately touched them. After the indictment, more alleged victims came forward. Also in March 2018, DeLand's teenage victim sued the diocese. DeLand was acquitted of charges in his first trial but pleaded no contest in a second separate trial in March 2019 on criminal sexual conduct. He was sentenced to two to 15 years in prison. DeLand was laicized in November 2022.

In November 2018, the diocese released a list of 18 deceased priests with credible accusations of sexual abuse of a minor.

== Bishops ==
Bishops of the Diocese of Saginaw

=== Bishops of Saginaw ===
1. William Francis Murphy (1938–1950)
2. Stephen Stanislaus Woznicki (1950–1968, retired)
3. Francis Frederick Reh (1968–1980, retired)
4. Kenneth Edward Untener (1980–2004)
5. Robert James Carlson (2005–2009), appointed Archbishop of Saint Louis
6. Joseph Robert Cistone (2009–2018)
7. Robert Dwayne Gruss (2019–present)

=== Auxiliary bishop ===
James Aloysius Hickey (1967–1974), appointed Bishop of Cleveland and later Archbishop of Washington (elevated to cardinal in 1988)

=== Other diocesan priests who became bishop ===
- Kenneth Joseph Povish, appointed Bishop of Crookston in 1970 and later Bishop of Lansing
- James A. Hickey, appointed archbishop of the Archdiocese of Washington
- Joseph Victor Adamec, appointed Bishop of Diocese of Altoona-Johnstown Diocese.

== Education ==
As of 2026, the Diocese of Saginaw has three pre-K to high schools and eight elementary schools, with a student enrollment of approximately 2,000.

=== High Schools ===
- All Saints Catholic – Bay City
- Nouvel Catholic Central – Saginaw
- Sacred Heart Academy – Mount Pleasant

== Coat of arms ==
The coat of arms for the Diocese of Saginaw shows a cross in red on a silver field. There are four flames which symbolize the tongues of fire of Pentecost. The name "Saginaw" means the "Place of the Sauk," who were known to the first Europeans as "Gens de Feu" (People of the Fire). Also, because the cathedral is dedicated to St. Mary and her Assumption, in the center of the cross is a six-pointed star. In addition to symbolizing that the Virgin Mary is the House of David, the six pointed star is also one of the heraldic attributes used to indicate the Assumption of Mary.
