= Saginaw Central City Historic Residential District =

- U.S. National Register of Historic Places
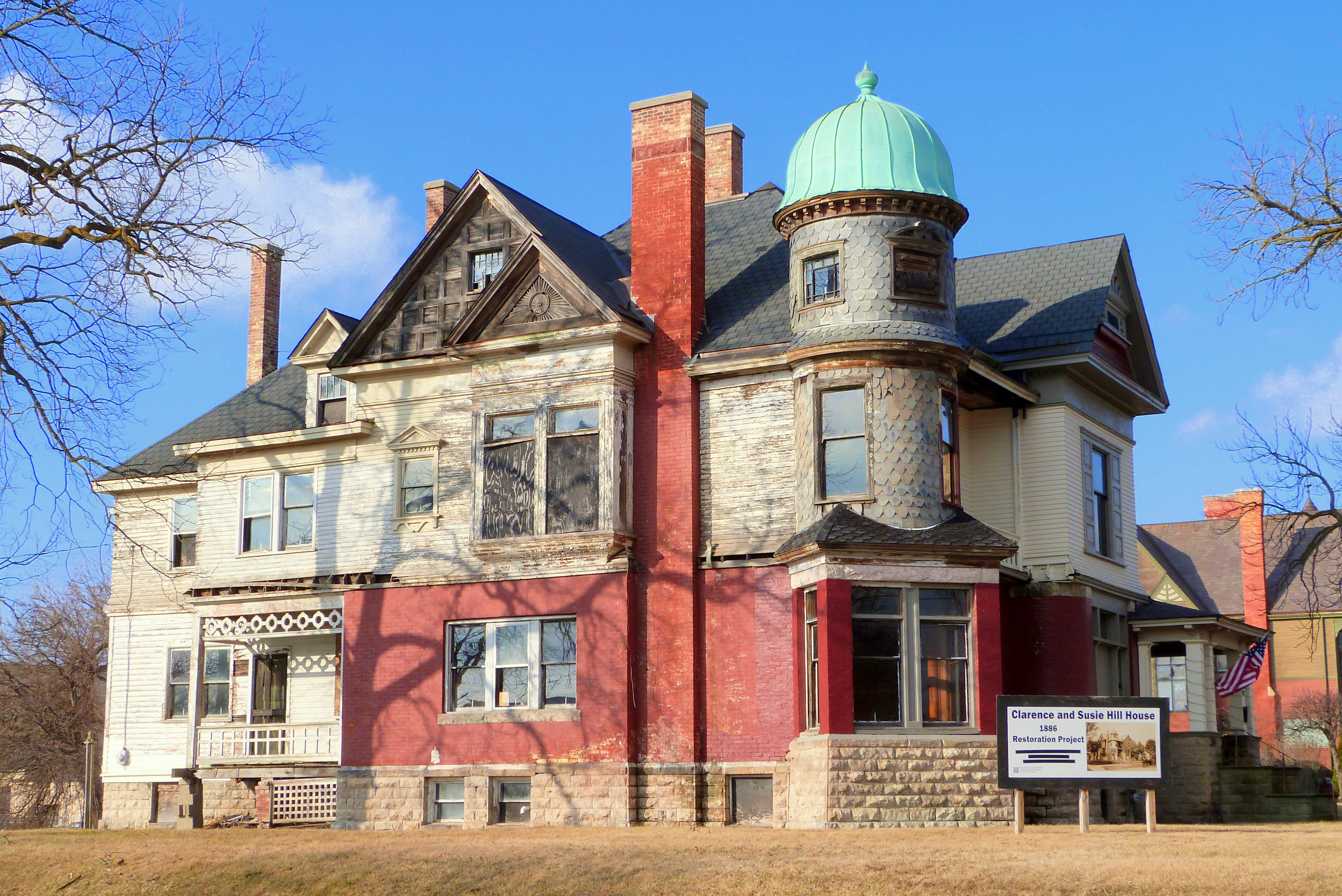
- Hill House
- Interactive map
- Location: Roughly bounded by Federal Ave., S. Baum St., Park and Hoyt Aves., Saginaw, Michigan
- Coordinates: 43°25′37″N 83°56′02″W
- Area: 100.5 acres (40.7 ha)
- Built: 1000
- Architect: Multiple
- Architectural style: Late 19th And 20th Century Revivals, Late Victorian, Carpenter Gothic
- NRHP reference No.: 79001168
- Added to NRHP: February 1, 1979

The Saginaw Central City Historic Residential District is a primarily residential historic district located in Saginaw, Michigan and roughly bounded by Federal Avenue, South Baum Street, South Park Avenue, and Hoyt Avenue. The district was listed on the National Register of Historic Places in 1979. Now commonly referred to as The Cathedral District, the boundaries have been extended to Holland Avenue to the south.

== History ==
The area around Saginaw was first settled in 1820. The section east of the river was established in about 1850, and as industry moved into the surrounding timber lands, the village of East Saginaw grew tremendously. It was granted a city charter in 1859, and by the 1870s, fifty mills were operating along the eastern bank of the river. Unfortunately, a series of fires in the 1850s and 1860s destroyed much of the early construction in what is now the Central City Historic District. The Jefferson Avenue Methodist Church, dedicated in 1868, is probably one of the oldest structures in the district.

Soon after, in the mid-1870s, the prosperity of East Saginaw and the Central City Historic District reached a peak, which continued on into the 1890s. The bulk of the residential construction in the district was done during this period, making the district predominantly Victorian in character. The largest of the houses were built by wealthy lumbermen, including Lucius and Jerry Holland (503 S. Jefferson), Clarence Hill (523 S. Jefferson) and William Q. Atwood, Saginaw's only African-American Lumber Baron (. Professionals and tradesmen also lived in the neighborhood, including as well as other doctors, craftsmen, and small business owners. In addition to homes, public buildings were also constructed during this time, including the Hoyt Library and the Castle Station Post Office.

The 1890s brought the consolidation of East Saginaw and Saginaw. It also brought the decline of lumbering as an economic driver. However, both coal and sugar beets rose in importance, and by 1910 General Motors was also a major area employer. Development in the Central City Historic Residential District slowed during this period, but a few new houses were constructed in the 1890s and beyond. By 1920, there was almost no space left in the neighborhood. Over the rest of the 20th century, very little new construction was accomplished in the neighborhood, and most of that was due to the demolition of an earlier structure.

== Description ==
The Saginaw Central City Historic Residential District contains approximately three hundred and twenty structures located within a forty block area. About nine percent of the structures in the district were built before 1875; these are primarily Carpenter Gothic residences. The bulk of the houses date from the mid-1870s through the mid-1890s. Some of these continue the Carpenter Gothic style, but it is mixed with other Victorian era architectural styles such as Romanesque Revival and Queen Anne. Later houses were added in Classical Revival and Georgian Revival styles, with some 1920s bungalows in the neighborhood as well.

Significant structures in the neighborhood include:

- Jefferson Avenue Methodist Church (306 South Jefferson): Designed in 1868 by A. Barrows, Jr., the church is a two-story Gothic Revival brick structure with a steeply pitched gable roof and a number of lancet windows.
- Rectory of St. Mary's Cathedral (615 Hoyt): Built in 1875, the rectory is a two-story Chateauesque building, three bays wide. It is built of yellow brick on a high stone foundation, with a slate-covered mansard roof.
- Holland House (503 South Jefferson): Built for lumbermen Lucius and Jerry Holland in 1885, this house is a three-story, three-bay Queen Anne structure with an irregular roofline and a profusion of surface treatments.
- Hill House (523 South Jefferson): Built for Clarence Hill in 1886, this house is a 2-1/2-story Queen Anne residence with irregular massing and substantial external ornamentation.
- Hoyt Library (505 Janes): This Romanesque building was constructed from plans begun (but never completed) by Henry Hobson Richardson. The 1890 building is constructed of rough-faced stone with large arched windows.
- Castle Station Post Office (500 Federal Avenue): Started in 1889, this structure is built of gray and white Bedford stone, and has asymmetrical massing with castle-like dormers and turrets.
- Wolfarth House (1000 Hoyt Avenue): Built in 1893 by Frank J. Wolfarth; prominent baker who owned Wolfarth Steam Bakery, this house is a 2-1/2 story Queen Anne with multiple porches and short turret. It has been fully restored.
- Lemke Mansion (934 Hoyt Avenue): built in 1910, Alex Lemke, President of AF Bartlett created a home of vitrified brick with thick, bold lines of mortar; massive white limestone trimmings, beautifully and boldly carved; windows set in massive stone frames; trimmed in rich oak and filled with stained glass windows.
- Curtis-Symons Home (1001 Hoyt Avenue): built by physician James BF Curtis in 1868 in the Victorian style, it was acquired in 1886 by Samuel E. Symons who at that time was vice-president of Symons Brothers and Company, Saginaw’s largest wholesale grocer. In 1938 the home was purchased by Dr. Richard Mudd, grandson of Dr. Samuel Mudd who had been accused of conspiracy in the President Lincoln assassination.
- Symons Mansion (732 S. Warren) was designed by CF Cowles and built in 1909 by John F. Marskey who never moved in due to financial scandal and bankruptcy. The home would be purchased by the Symons grocery family and remain in their possession until the late 1960s.

== Gallery ==
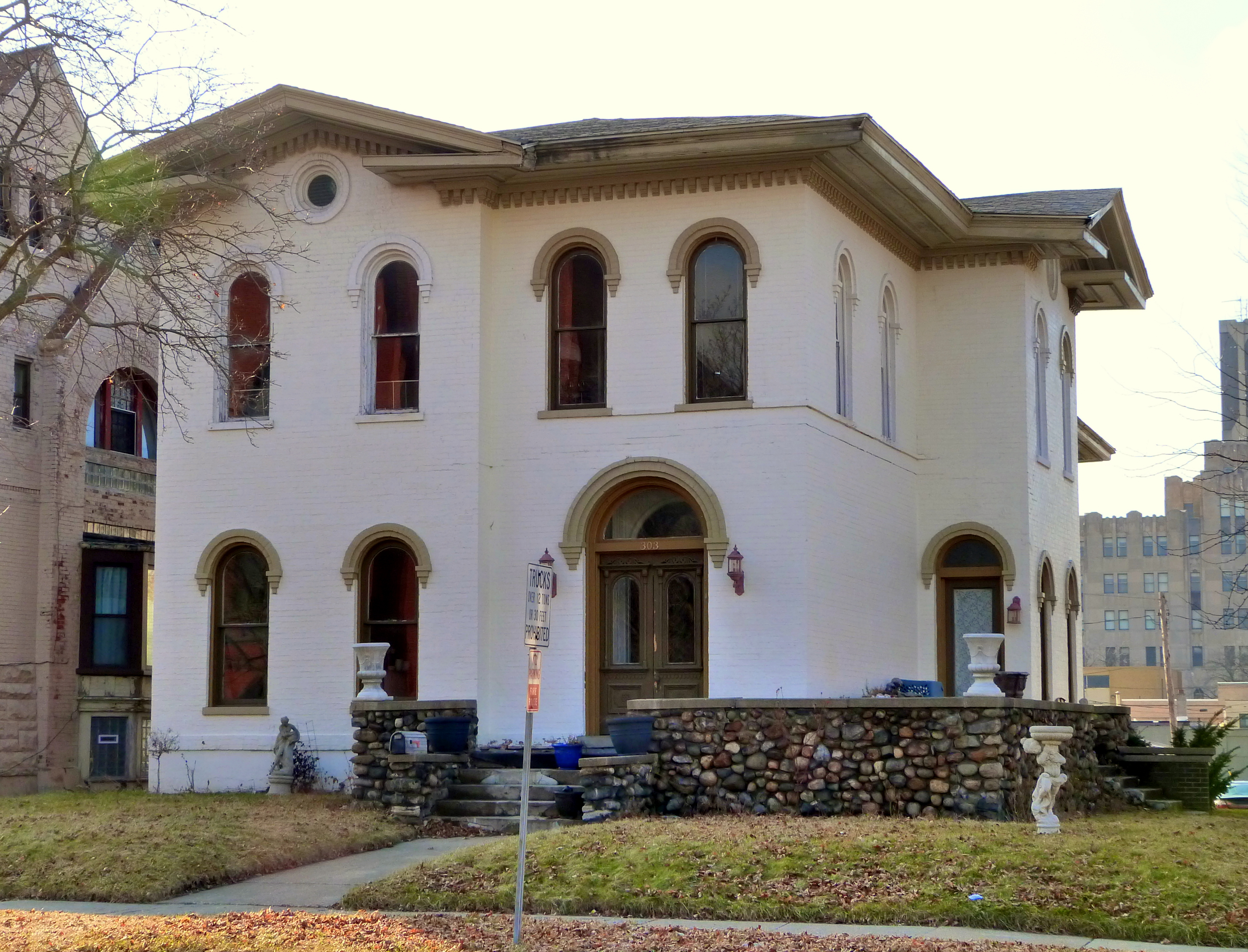
303 S Jefferson

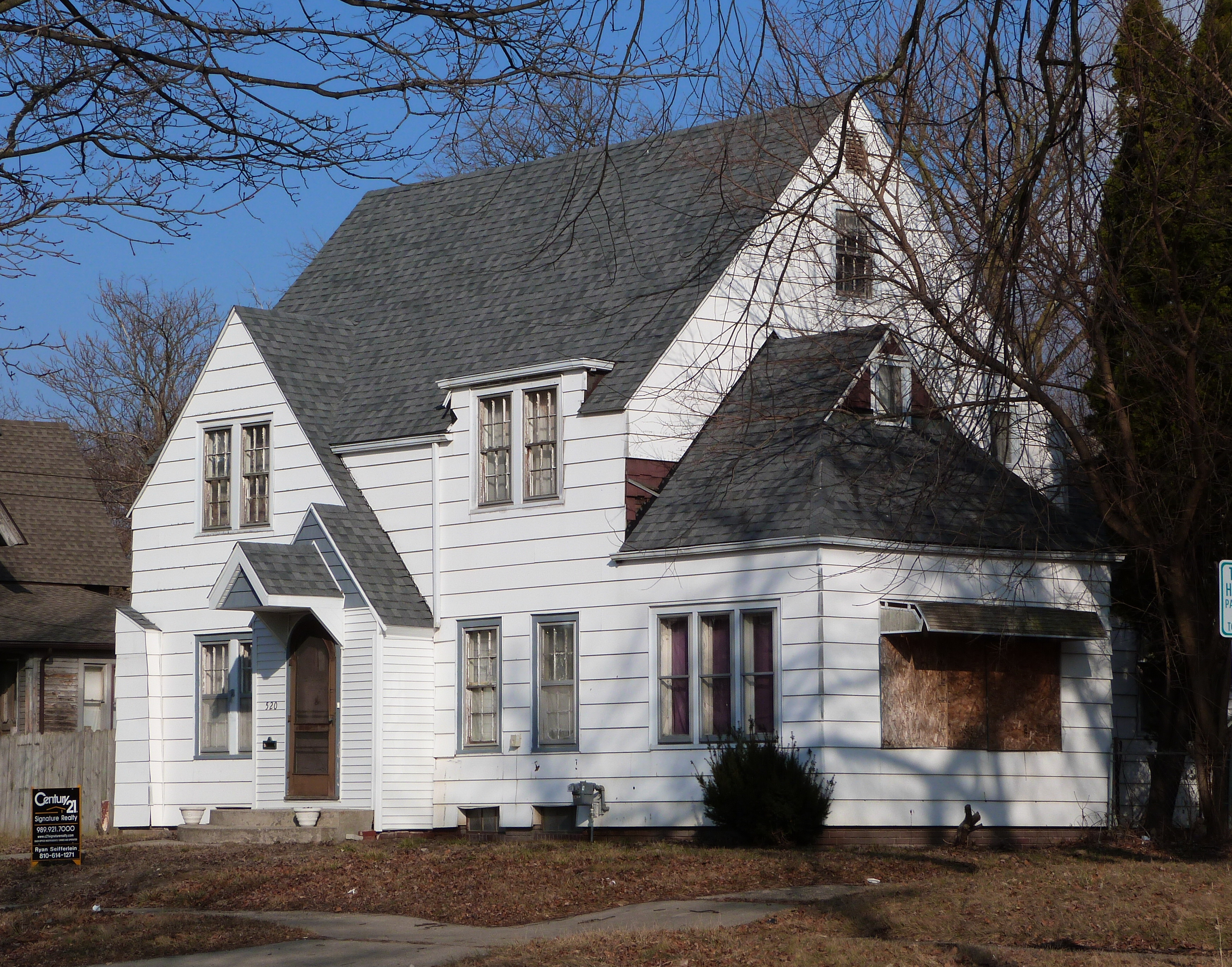
520 S Jefferson

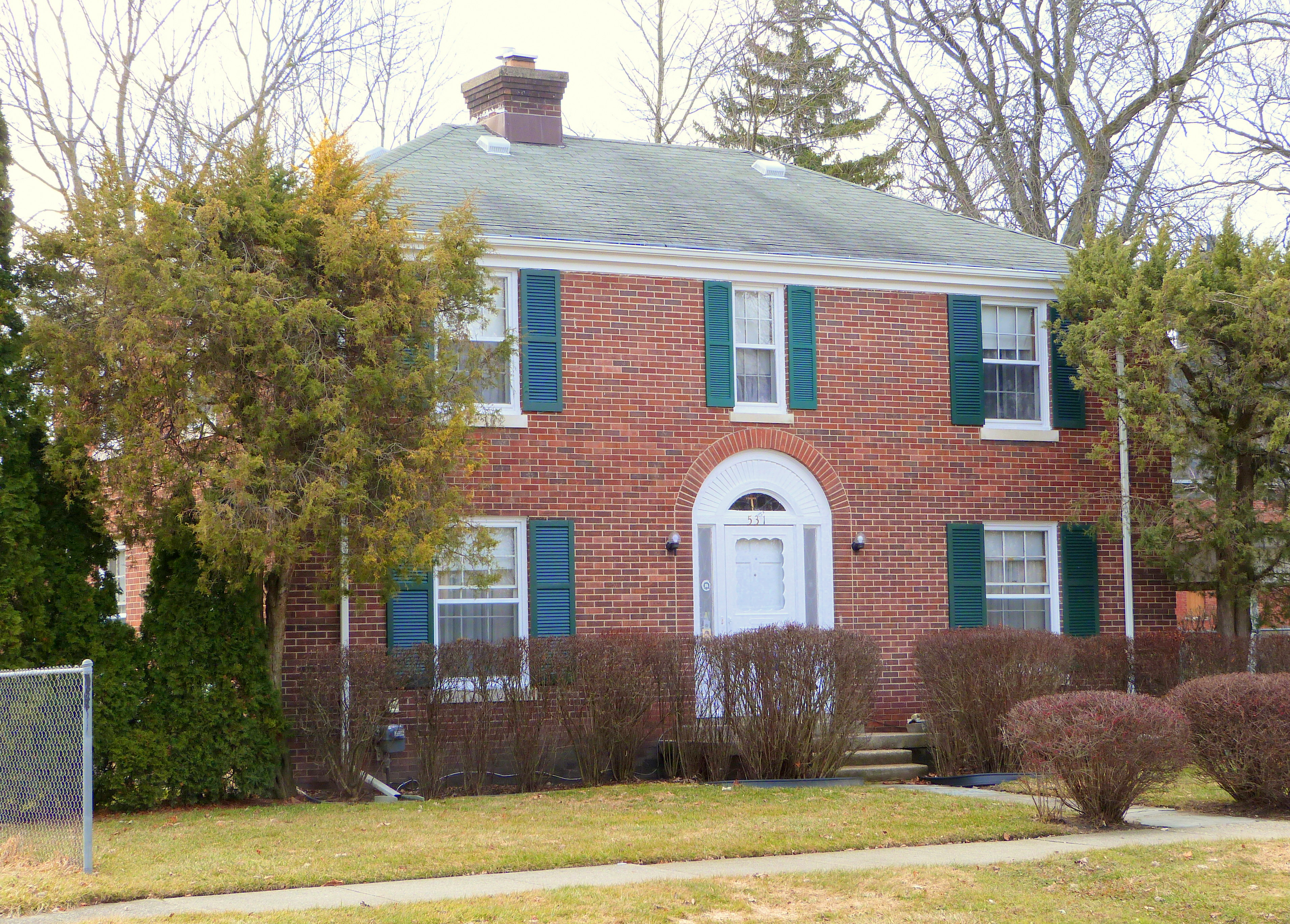
531 S Weadock

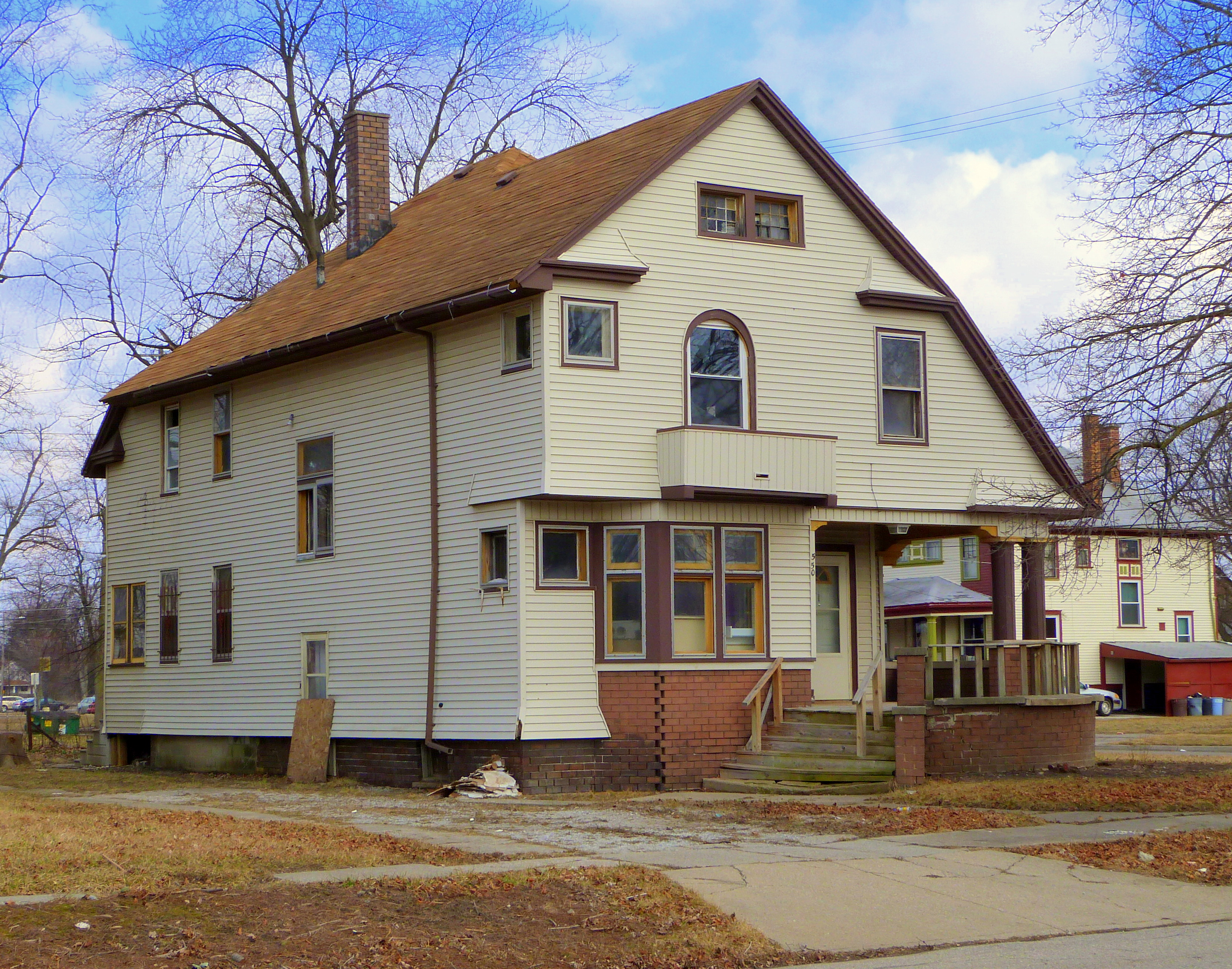
550 S Weadock

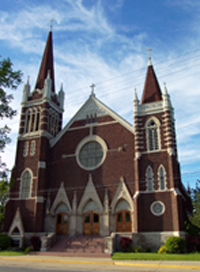
Cathedral of Mary of the Assumption

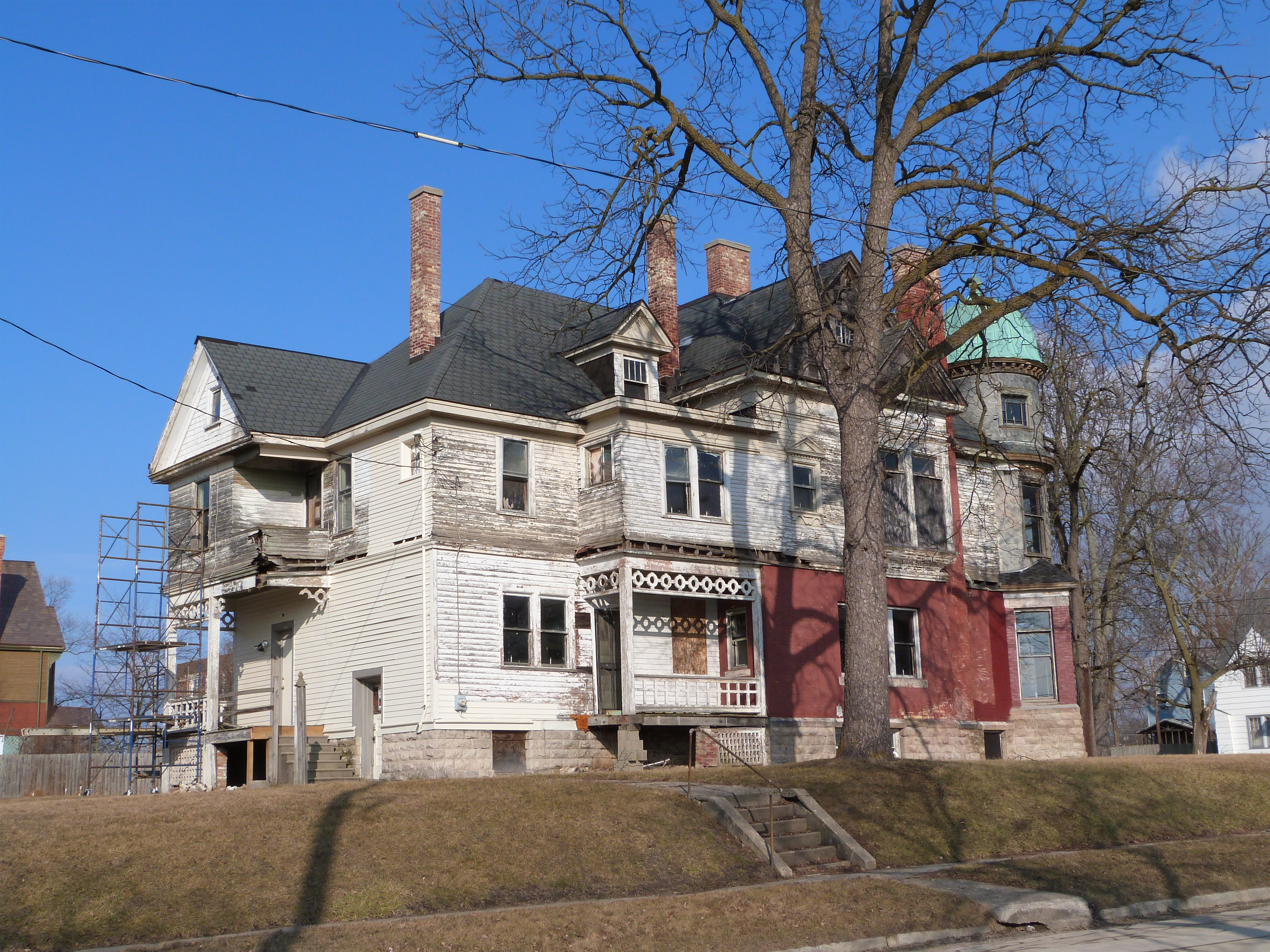
Hill House

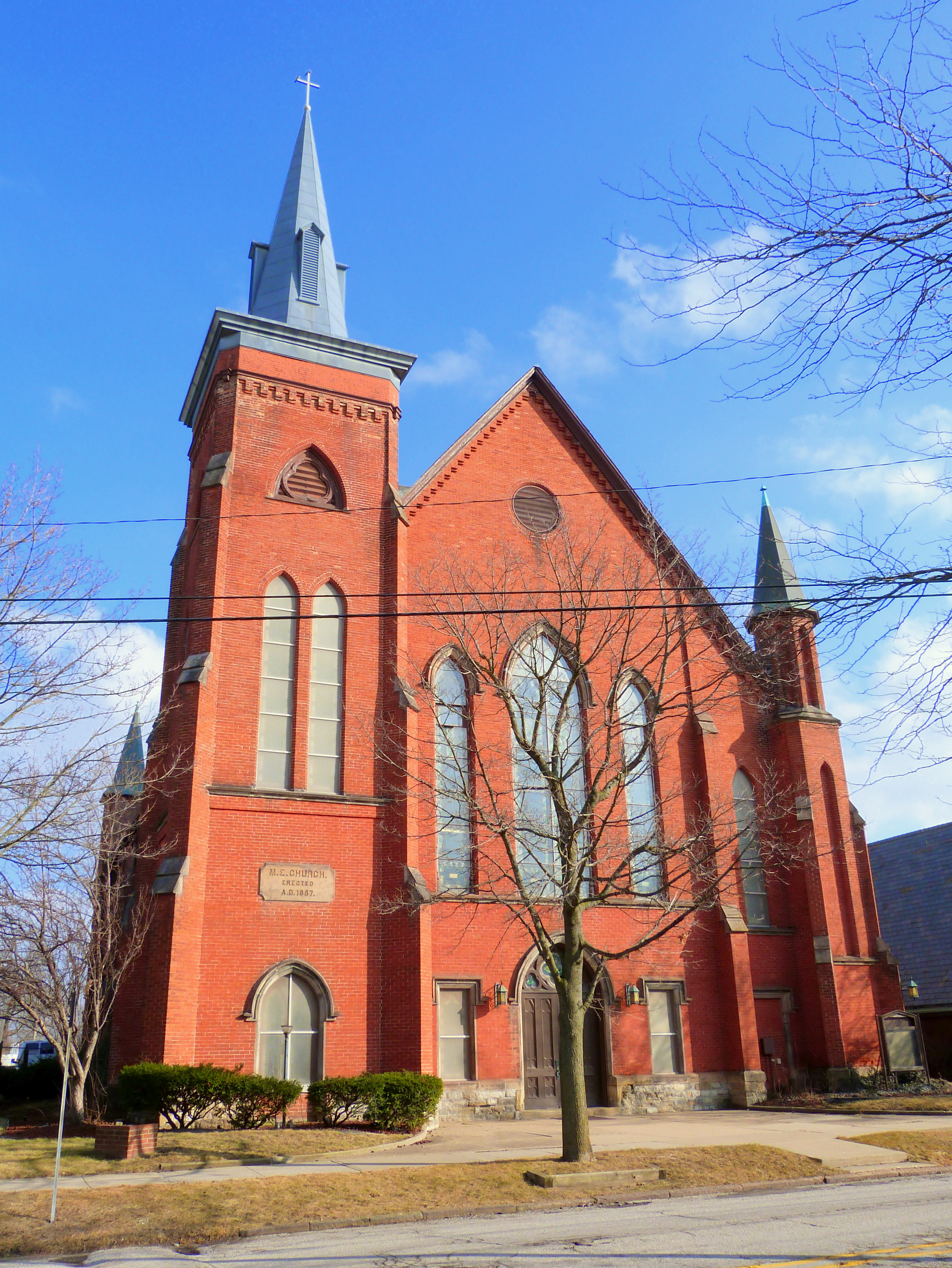
Jefferson Avenue Methodist Church

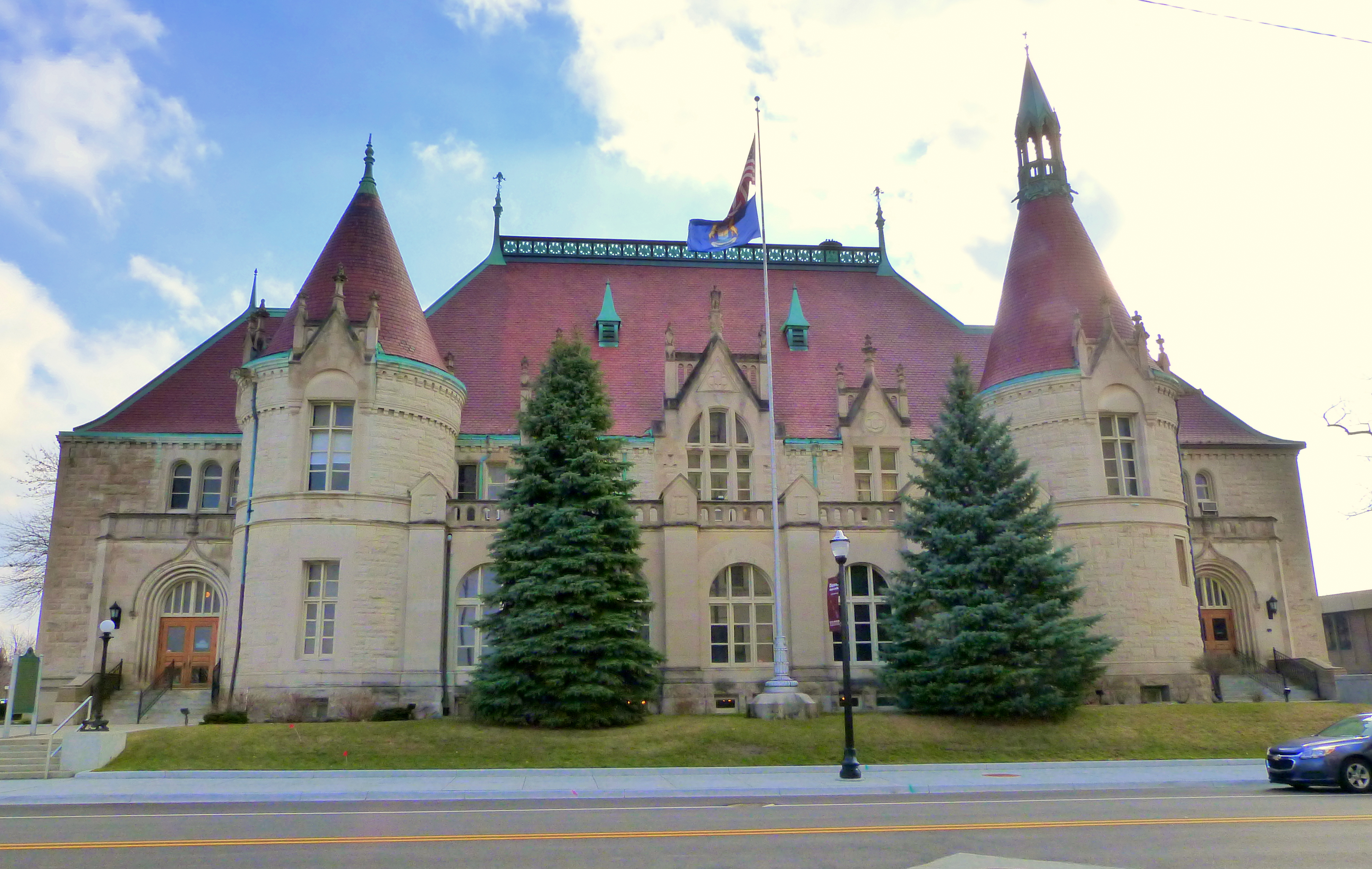
Castle Station (now a museum)

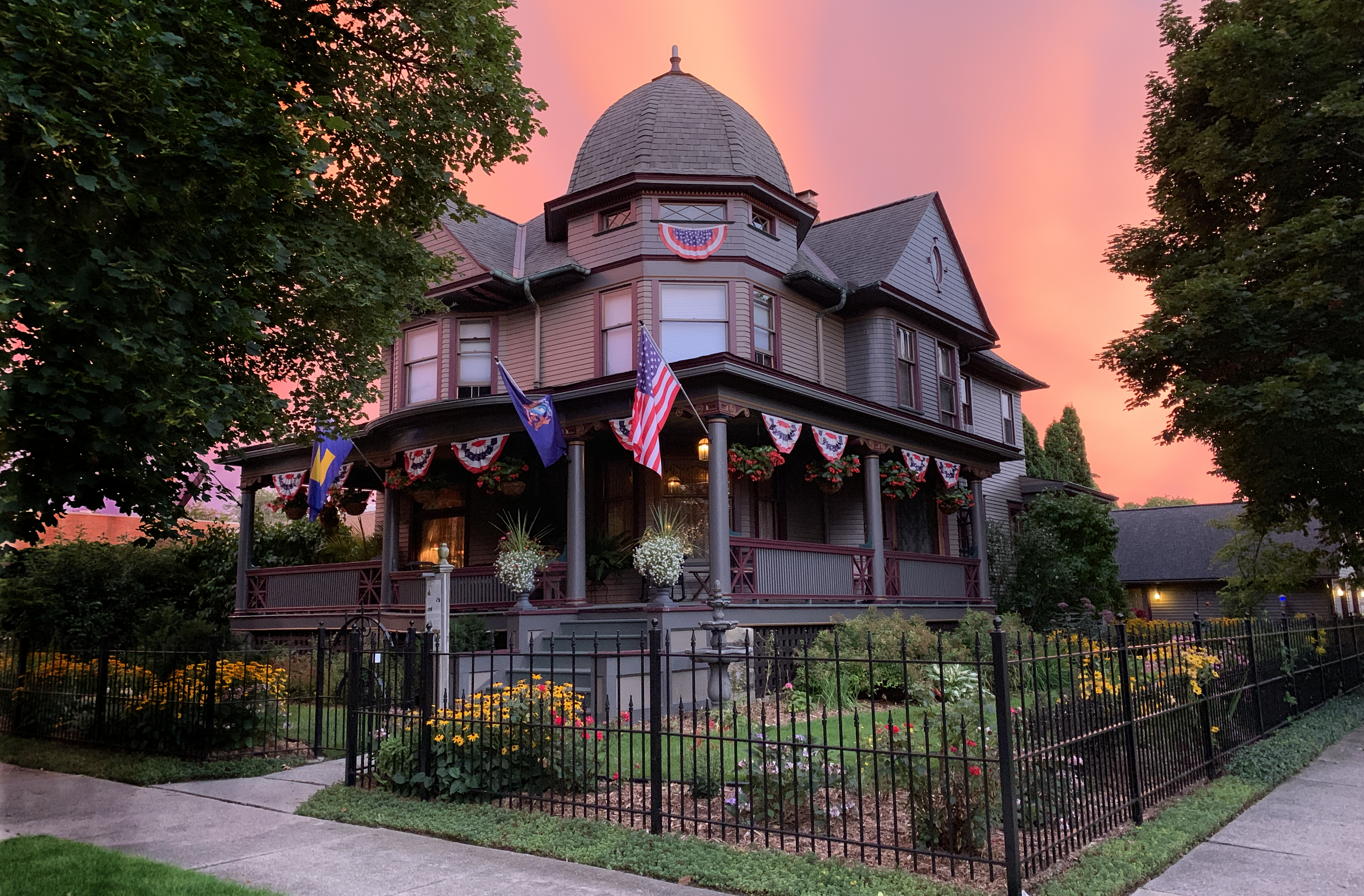
Wolfarth House

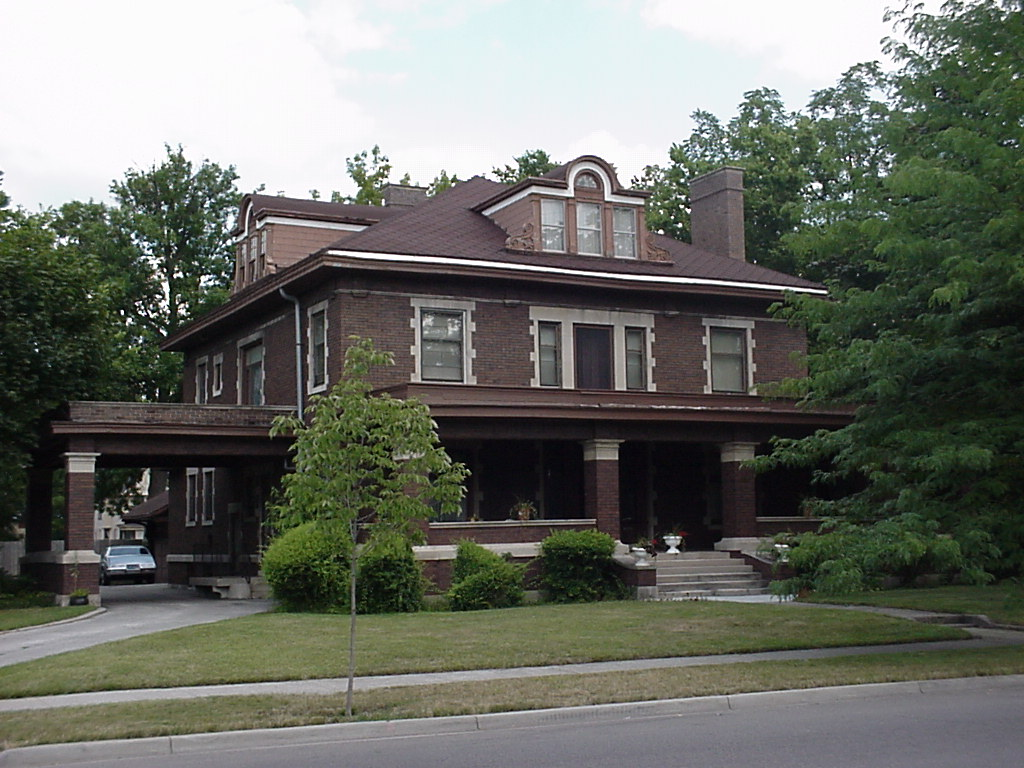
732 S Warren

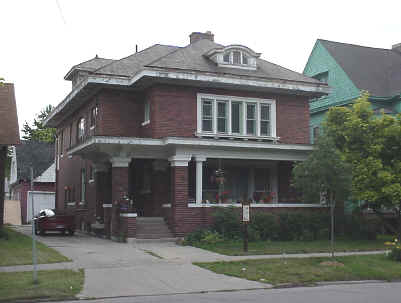
934 Hoyt Avenue
