= Donald Martin Carroll =

American catholic priest (1909–2002)

- Bishop-Elect of Rockford
- Church: Catholic Church
- Diocese: Diocese of Rockford
- In office: June 27, 1956 – September 25, 1956
- Predecessor: Raymond Peter Hillinger
- Successor: Loras Thomas Lane

Orders
- Ordination: April 7, 1934 by George Mundelein

Personal details
- Born: November 25, 1909 Chicago, Illinois, United States
- Died: January 3, 2002 (aged 92)

Donald Martin Carroll (November 25, 1909 – January 3, 2002) was an American Roman Catholic priest.

Born in Chicago, Illinois, Carroll was ordained a Roman Catholic priest for the Roman Catholic Archdiocese of Chicago, Illinois on April 7, 1934. On June 27, 1956, he was appointed Bishop of the Roman Catholic Diocese of Rockford, Illinois, but resigned on September 25, 1956 before his consecration due to ill health.
