= Leo Binz =

American prelate (1900–1979)

His Excellency, The Most Reverend Leo Binz
- Archbishop of St. Paul and Minneapolis
- See: St. Paul and Minneapolis
- Installed: April 28, 1962
- Term ended: May 28, 1975
- Predecessor: William O. Brady
- Successor: John Roach
- Other posts: Coadjutor Bishop of Winona (1942–49); Coadjutor Archbishop of Dubuque (1949–54); Archbishop of Dubuque (1954–61)

Orders
- Ordination: March 15, 1924 by Giuseppe Palica
- Consecration: December 21, 1942 by Amleto Cicognani

Personal details
- Born: October 31, 1900 Stockton, Illinois, US
- Died: October 2, 1979 (aged 78) Maywood, Illinois, US
- Motto: Christo vivere (To live for Christ)
- Coat of arms

Ordination history of Leo Binz
History
Episcopal consecration
- Consecrated by: Amleto Giovanni Cicognani
- Date: December 21, 1942
Episcopal succession
Bishops consecrated by Leo Binz as principal consecrator
- Loras Thomas Lane: May 29, 1951
- James Edward Michaels: April 14, 1966

Leo Binz (October 31, 1900 – October 9, 1979) was an American prelate of the Catholic Church. He served as Archbishop of Dubuque (1954–1961) and as Archbishop of St. Paul and Minneapolis (1962–1975). A native of Illinois, he became a priest in 1924 and a bishop in 1942.

== Early life and education ==
Leo Binz was born on October 31, 1900, in Stockton, Illinois, the third child of Michael and Thecla (née Reible) Binz. The family lived on a small farm near the Mississippi River, east of Dubuque, Iowa. Following his confirmation, a young Binz declared to Bishop Peter Muldoon, "I'm going to be a bishop!"

In 1914, Binz enrolled at Loras College in Dubuque, where he began his preparatory studies for the priesthood. He transferred to St. Mary's Seminary in Baltimore, Maryland, in 1918. He earned a Bachelor of Arts degree (1919) and a Master of Arts degree (1920) from St. Mary's.

From 1920 to 1921, Binz studied at the Sulpician Seminary in Washington, D.C. He was then sent to continue his studies at the Pontifical North American College in Rome. He received a Doctor of Sacred Theology degree from the Propaganda University (1924) and a Doctor of Philosophy degree from the Pontifical Gregorian University (1926).

== Priesthood ==
On March 15, 1924, Binz was ordained a priest for the Diocese of Rockford at the Basilica of St. John Lateran in Rome by Archbishop Giuseppe Palica. From 1924 to 1926, while pursuing his doctoral studies in Rome, he taught at the North American College.

After returning to Illinois, the diocese assigned Binz as a curate at St. Mary's Parish in Sterling. Bishop Edward Francis Hoban appointed him as his secretary in 1928, and as chancellor of the diocese In 1932. Binz was reassigned in 1932, serving as pastor in parishes in Cherry Valley, Rockford, and Belvidere, Illinois.

The Vatican elevated Binz to the rank of papal chamberlain in 1934 and domestic prelate in 1939. From 1936 to 1942, he served in Washington D.C. as secretary to Archbishop Amleto Giovanni Cicognani, the apostolic delegate to the United States. While working for Cicognani, Binz was sent to Dubuque to investigate the financial mismanagement of the Archdiocese of Dubuque by Archbishop Francis Beckman.

== Episcopacy ==
=== Bishop of Winona ===
On November 21, 1942, Binz was appointed titular bishop of Pinara and coadjutor bishop of Winona by Pope Pius XII. He received his episcopal consecration on December 21, 1942, from Cicognani, with Bishops Henry Rohlman and Edward Hoban serving as co-consecrators, at St. James Pro-Cathedral in Rockford. As coadjutor bishop, he administered the diocese, as Bishop Francis Martin Kelly was in poor health. Binz established Immaculate Heart of Mary Seminary in Winona, centralized all the offices of the diocese, and started the plans for building the first cathedral in Winona.

=== Archbishop of Dubuque ===
Coat of arms as archbishop of Dubuque

On October 15, 1949, Pius XII named Binz as titular archbishop of Silyum and coadjutor archbishop of Dubuque. In 1952, Binze established the Sisters of the Visitation of Dubuque in the archdiocese. Upon the resignation of Archbishop Henry Rohlman, Binz succeeded him as the sixth archbishop of Dubuque on December 2, 1954.

During his seven years as archbishop, Binz helped develop Catholic high schools in the archdiocese. Nationally, he served as president of the National Catholic Educational Association in Leesburg, Virginia, from 1954 to 1955, and headed the youth department of the National Catholic Welfare Council. He also established the North American Martyrs Retreat House in Cedar Falls, Iowa, and expanded the archdiocesan chapter of Catholic Charities. Binz created the Rural Life Committee to assist small parishes outside the urban areas.

=== Archbishop of Saint Paul and Minneapolis-Saint Paul ===
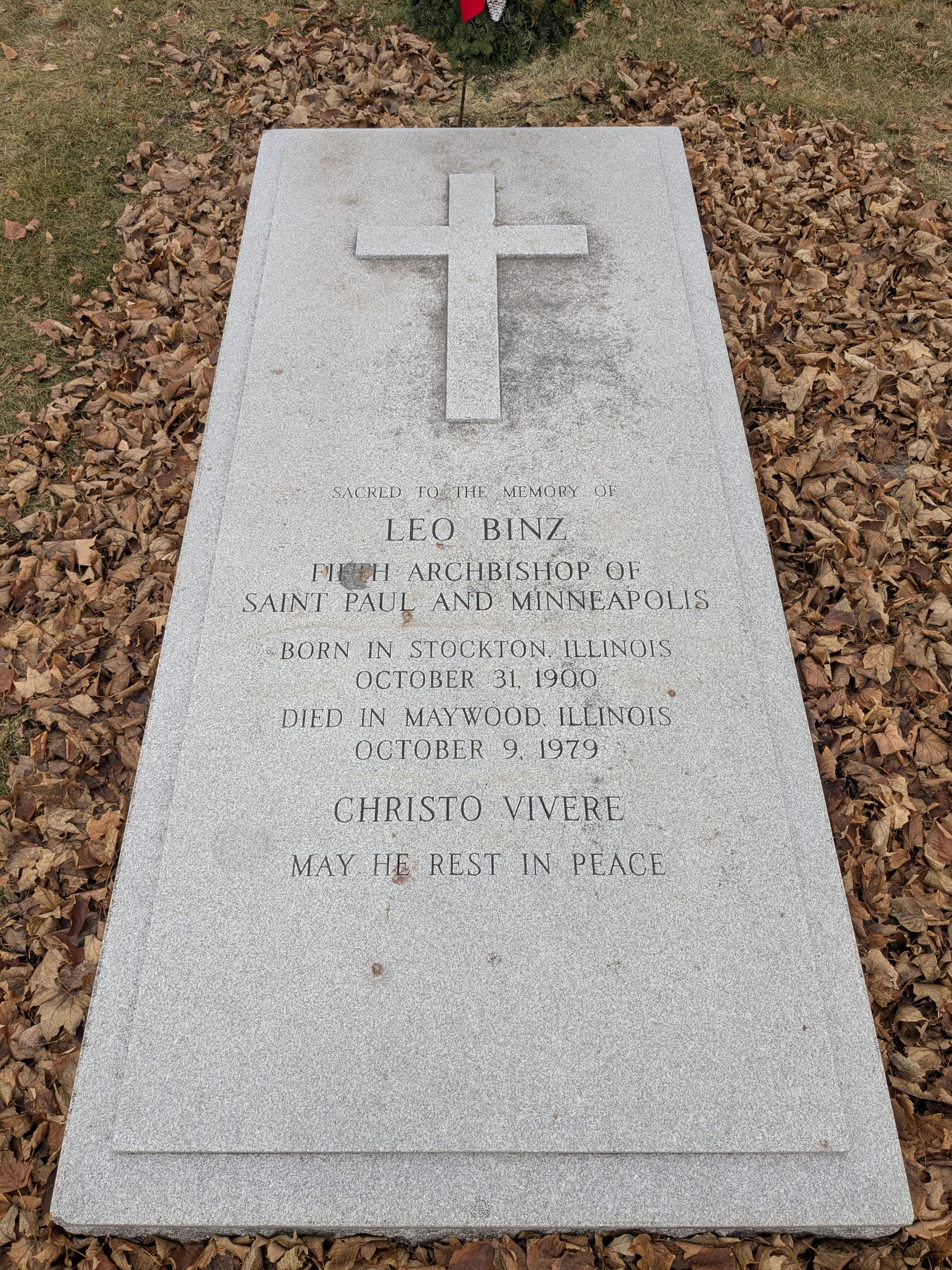
Grave of Archbishop Binz, Resurrection Cemetery, Mendota Heights, Minnesota

On December 16, 1961 Pope John XXIII named Binz as the fifth archbishop of Saint Paul. He was installed in St. Paul, Minnesota, on April 28, 1962.

From 1962 to 1965 Binz attended all four sessions of the Second Vatican Council in Rome, and faithfully implemented the reforms promulgated by the council in the archdiocese. He was known for his pastoral approach to leadership. He promoted active lay participation and Christian renewal in the archdiocese through fraternal societies. He strengthened the local chapter or Catholic Charities, and he continued the annual May Day rosary processions.

Binz was named to the Pontifical Commission on Birth Control and was one of only seven members of the 72 member commission to vote that artificial birth control was intrinsically evil.

On July 11, 1966, Pope Paul VI renamed the Archdiocese of Saint Paul to the Archdiocese of Minneapolis-Saint Paul to reflect the equal stature of the two cities. The pope designated the Basilica of Saint Mary in Minneapolis as co-cathedral of the archdiocese. Binz became the first archbishop of Saint Paul and Minneapolis.

As his health began to decline, Binz requested and received a coadjutor. Paul VI named Bishop Leo Christopher Byrne as coadjutor archbishop of Minneapolis-Saint Paul on July 31, 1967. Binz allowed Byrne to take greater control of the administration of the archdiocese. Byrne, however, died on October 21, 1974.

== Retirement and death ==
Paul VI accepted Binz's resignation as archbishop of Minneapolis-Saint Paul on May 25, 1975. He died four years later on October 9, 1979, in Maywood, Illinois. Binz was buried with other archbishops of the archdiocese at Resurrection Cemetery in Mendota Heights, Minnesota.

The following places were named after Binz:

- Binz Hall at Loras College
- Binz Refectory at Saint Paul Seminary.

== Notes ==
Catholic Church titles
Preceded by Henry Patrick Rohlman	Archbishop of Dubuque; 1954–1962	Succeeded by James Joseph Byrne
Preceded by William Otterwell Brady	Archbishop of Saint Paul; 1962–1966	Succeeded by title changed
Preceded by new title	Archbishop of Saint Paul and Minneapolis; 1966–1975	Succeeded by John Robert Roach
