= Cathedral of Saint Peter (Rockford, Illinois) =

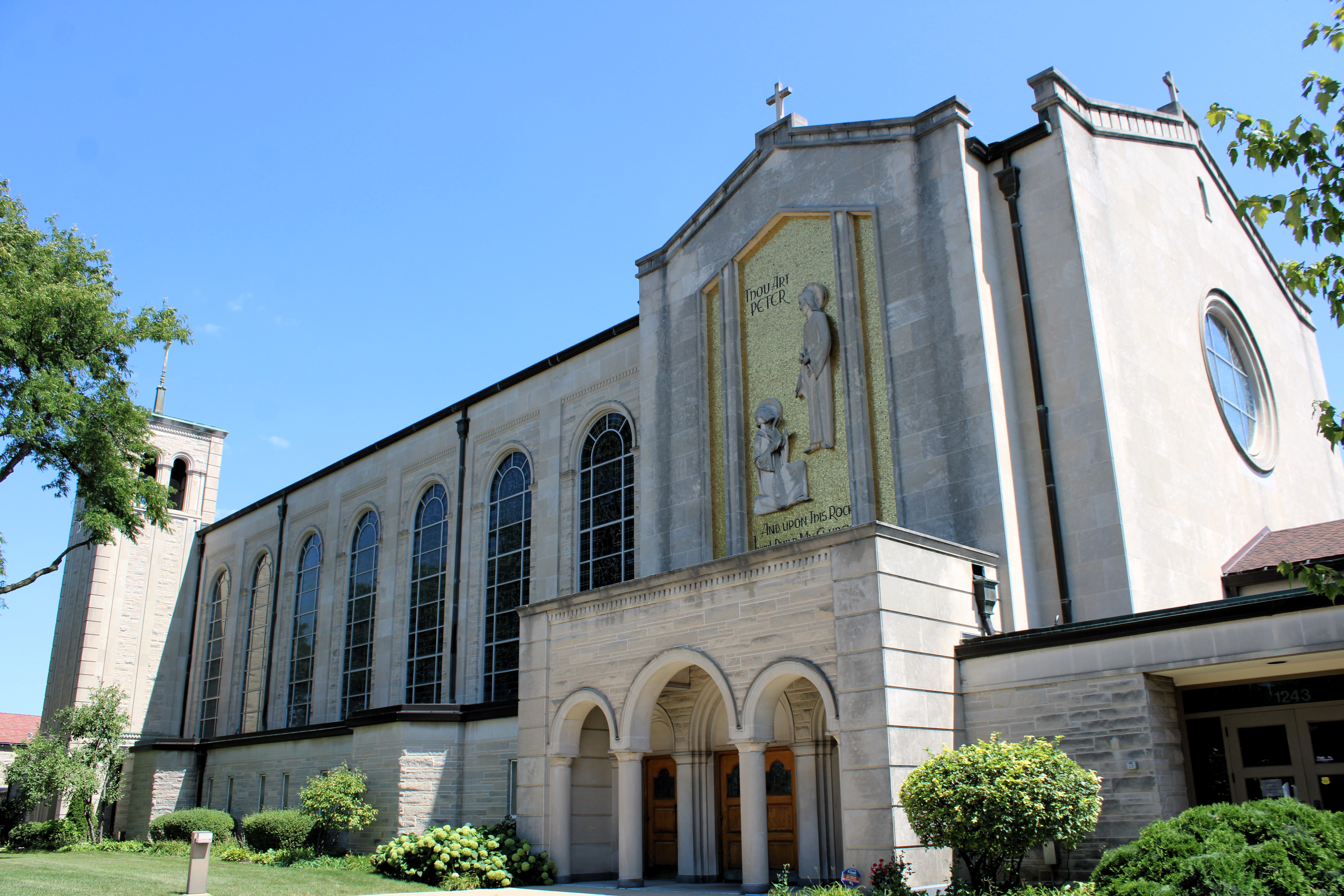
- Cathedral of St. Peter in 2023

- Location in Illinois Cathedral of Saint Peter (the United States)
- 42°17′06″N 89°04′58″W
- Location: 1243 N. Church Street; Rockford, Illinois
- Country: United States
- Denomination: Roman Catholic Church
- Website: www.cathedralofstpeter.org

History
- Status: Cathedral/Parish church
- Founded: 1922
- Dedication: St. Peter the Apostle
- Dedicated: May 15, 1960
- Consecrated: October 11, 1978

Architecture
- Style: Italianate
- Groundbreaking: 1958
- Completed: 1960

Specifications
- Capacity: 676-834

Administration
- Diocese: Rockford

Clergy
- Bishop: Most Rev. David J. Malloy
- Rector: Very Rev. Stephen St. Jules

The Cathedral of Saint Peter is the mother church of the Catholic Diocese of Rockford in Rockford, Illinois, in the United States. It is the second church to serve the diocese as its cathedral.

== History ==
The predecessor for the Cathedral of St. Peter was St. William's Chapel, established in 1915 as a mission church in Rockford. By 1920, the congregation of St. William's had expanded sufficiently to become a parish. The parishioners bought a property at the summit of Council Hill in Rockford and began construction of St. Peter's, a combination church and school, in 1921.During the 1950s. the growth of the parish necessitated a newer, larger church. The cornerstone for the new Peter's Church was blessed by Bishop Loras Lane in August 1958. The church was dedicated on May 15, 1960.

In 1970, Bishop Arthur O'Neill replaced St. James Cathedral, constructed in 1908, with the newer St. Peter's Cathedral. The diocese in 1998 remodeled the sanctuary and commissioned a new altar. The altar was consecrated by Cardinal Francis George of Chicago on September 29, 1998. In 2011, the rectory at the cathedral suffered $10,000 in damage after an electrical fire broke out.

The diocese in March 2019 announced plans to demolish the old rectory, convent and school building on the cathedral campus. However, community groups organized to save the buildings for their historical value. The diocese argued that it did not have the $5 million needed to restore them. In June 2019, the diocese razed all three buildings.

== Pipe organ ==
St. Peter's houses a 1978 Wicks Organ Company pipe organ, Opus 5706. It is located in the rear gallery of the cathedral. Some of the pipes are exposed in the large case that frames a rose window. The organ features five divisions, 45 stops, 47 ranks, and 2,707 pipes. The manual compass is 61 notes and the pedal compass is 32 notes.

The diocese in 2026 began a project to renovate the pipe organ.

Images of cathedral campus

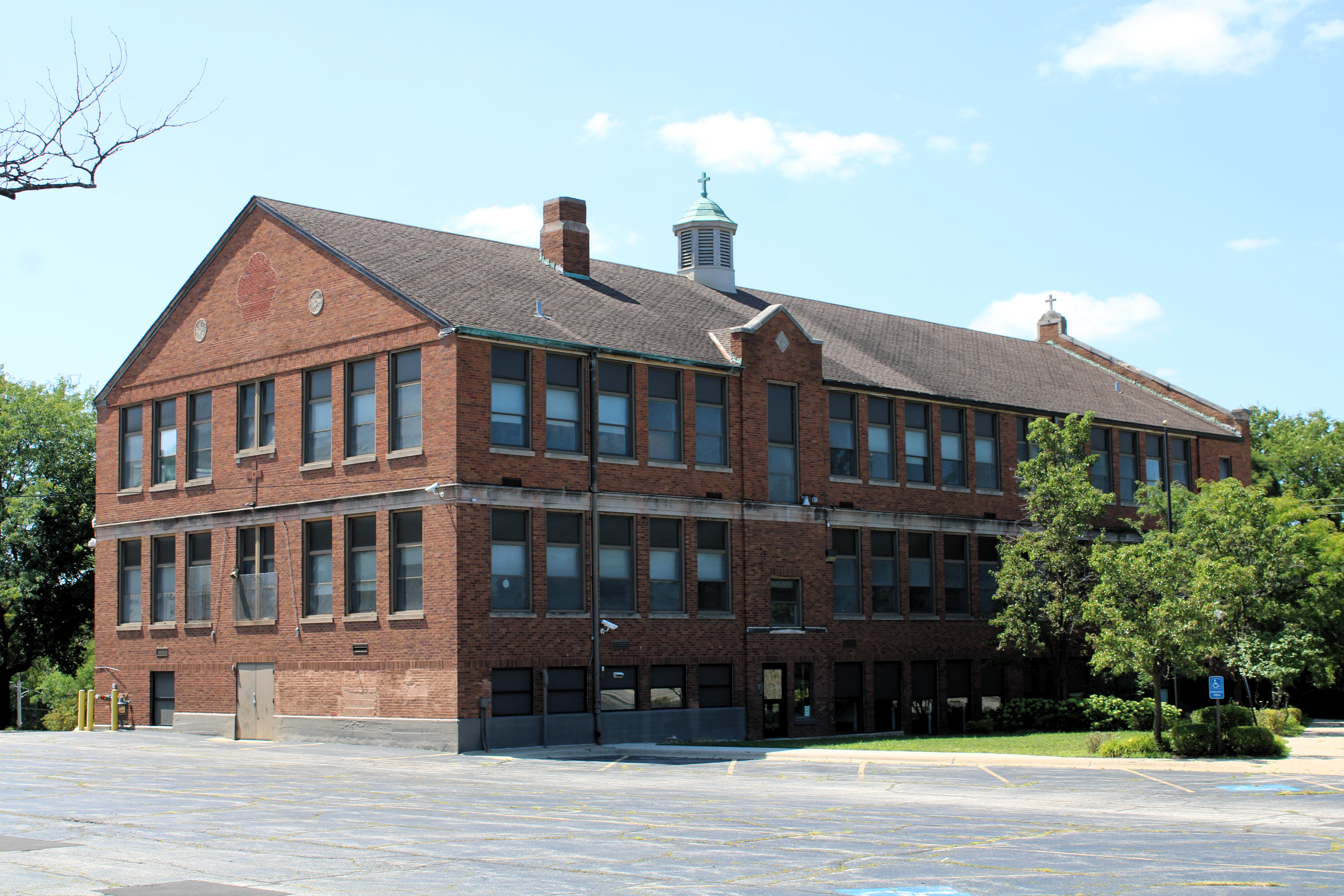
Former St. Peter's School

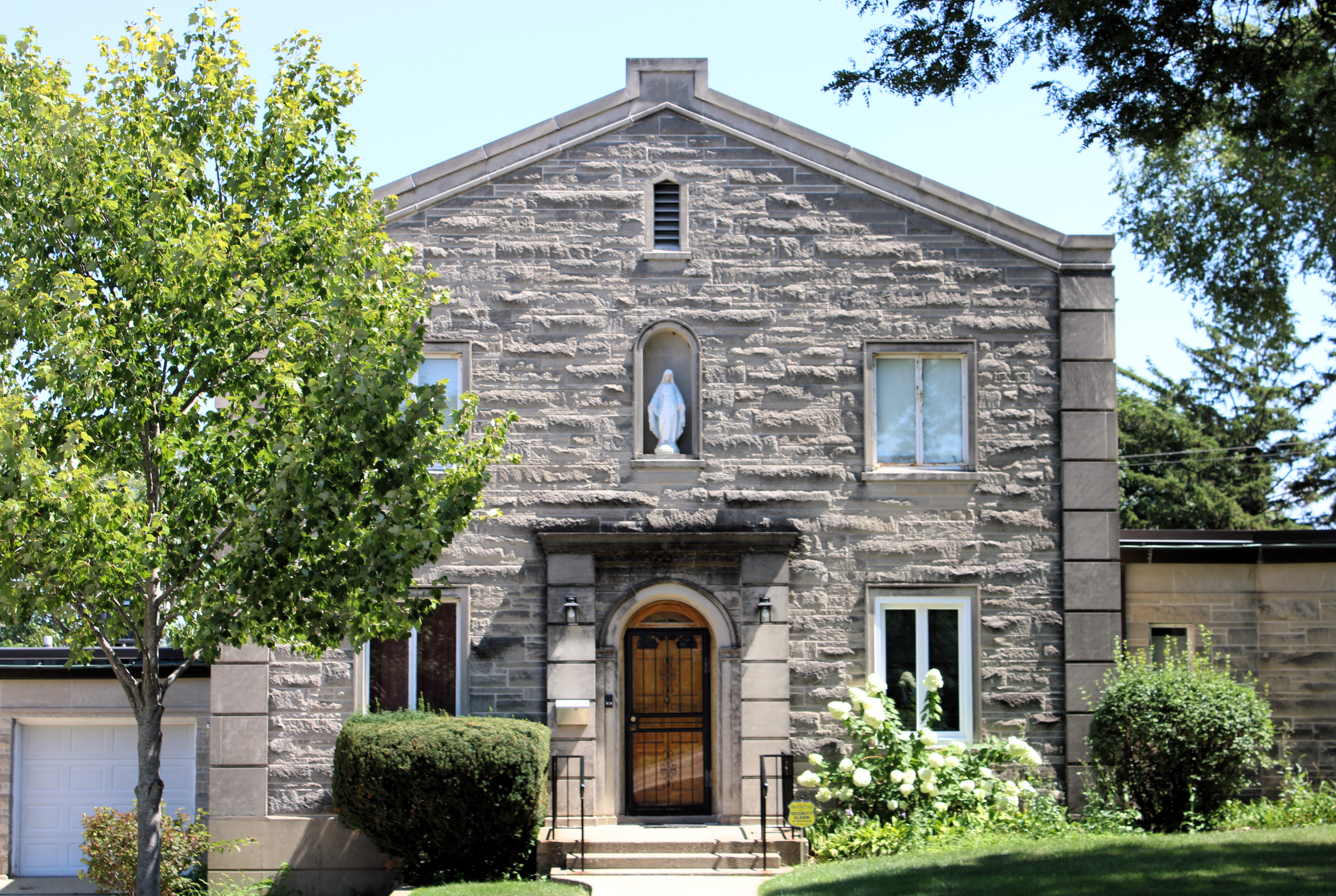
Former rectory

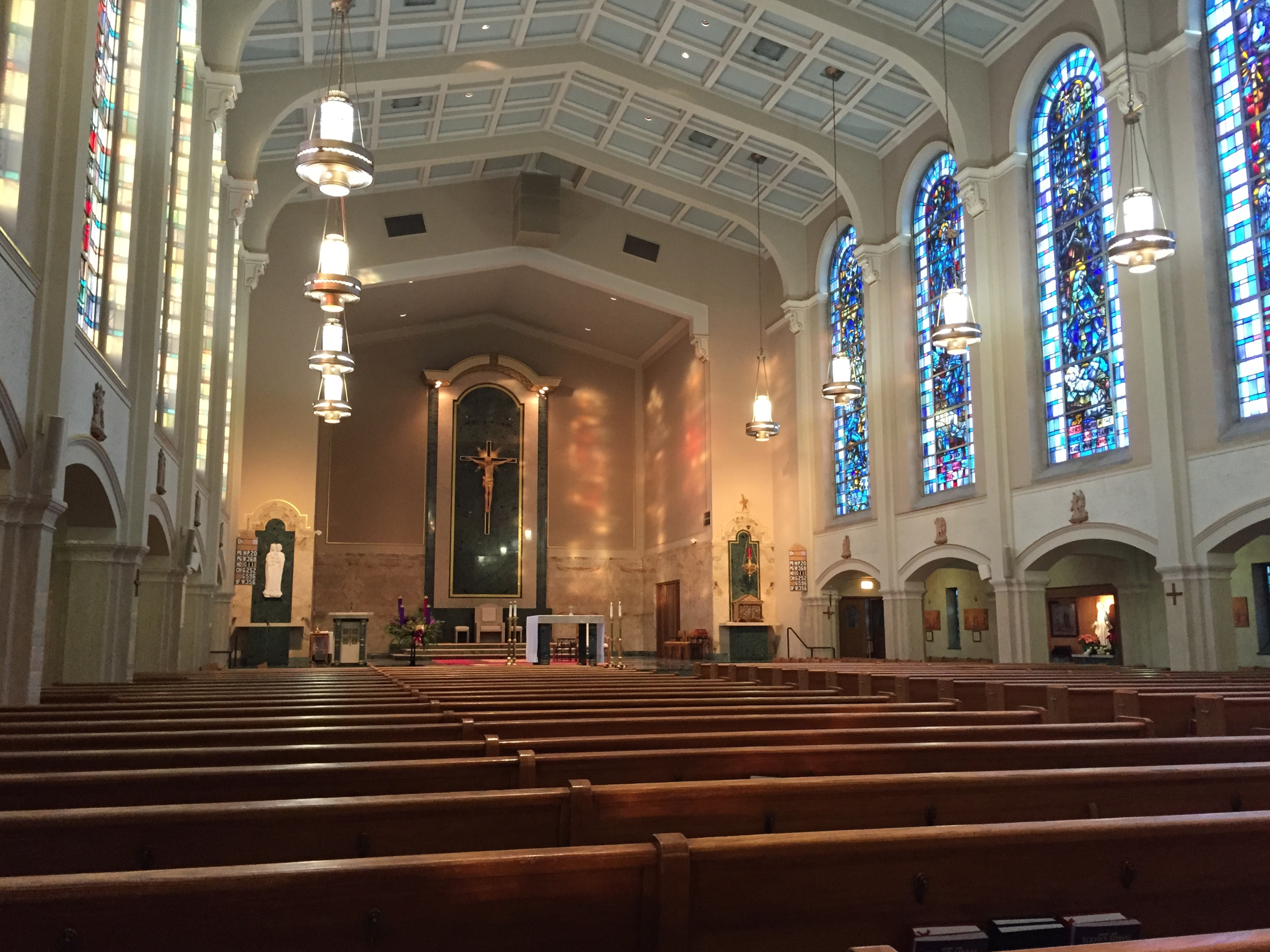
View towards altar (2014)

== See also ==
- List of Catholic cathedrals in the United States
- List of cathedrals in the United States
