= St. Edward Central Catholic High School =

Location
- 335 Locust Street; Elgin, Illinois 60123; United States; 42°1′57″N 88°17′20″W

Information
- Type: private
- Denomination: Roman Catholic
- Patron saint: St. Edward the Confessor
- Established: 1941
- Founder: Dominican Sisters
- Oversight: Diocese of Rockford
- Superintendent: Annmarie Dufelmeier
- Principal: Annmarie Dufelmeier
- Grades: 9–12
- Gender: coed
- Enrollment: 209 (2023)
- Colors: Green and Gold
- Mascot: Johnny Greenwave
- Team name: The Mighty Green Wave
- Accreditation: North Central Association of Colleges and Schools
- Newspaper: The Edge
- Tuition: $5,668
- Website: http://www.stedhs.org

St. Edward Central Catholic High School is a private, Roman Catholic high school in Elgin, Illinois. It is located in the Roman Catholic Diocese of Rockford and competes athletically in their own conference, recently established during late 2026.

St. Edward Central Catholic was established in 1941 by the Adrian Dominican Sisters. It was named after St. Edward the Confessor and in honor of Bishop Edward Francis Hoban, 2nd Bishop of the Rockford diocese.
