= Thomas G. Doran =

His Excellency, The Most Reverend Thomas George Doran
- Bishop of Rockford
- Church: Roman Catholic Church
- See: Diocese of Rockford
- In office: June 24, 1994 to March 20, 2012
- Predecessor: Arthur Joseph O'Neill
- Successor: David John Malloy

Orders
- Ordination: December 20, 1961 by Martin O'Connor
- Consecration: June 24, 1994 by Joseph Bernardin

Personal details
- Born: February 20, 1936 Rockford, Illinois, US
- Died: September 1, 2016 (aged 80)
- Education: St. Pius X Seminary; Pontifical Gregorian University
- Motto: Spes anchora vitae (Hope is the anchor of life)

Thomas George Doran (February 20, 1936 – September 1, 2016) was an American prelate of the Roman Catholic Church who served as the eighth bishop of the Diocese of Rockford in Illinois from 1994 to 2012. Doran also served on the Supreme Tribunal of the Apostolic Signatura in Rome, the highest court of the Catholic Church.

== Biography ==
=== Early life and education ===
Doran was born on February 20, 1936, in Rockford, Illinois to Robert J. and Gretchen (Durst ) Doran. He attended St. James Pro-Cathedral Grade School in Rockford, graduating in 1950. He then attended Campion High School in Prairie du Chien, Wisconsin, finishing in 1954. Doran then entered the St. Pius X Seminary at Loras College in Dubuque, Iowa, studying philosophy and classics. After graduating from St. Pius in 1958, he entered the Pontifical Gregorian University in Rome.

=== Ordination and ministry ===
Doran was ordained to the priesthood for the Diocese of Rockford by Bishop Martin O'Connor on December 20, 1961, in St. Peter's Basilica in Rome. He completed his Licentiate of Sacred Theology in Rome in 1962.

Upon his return to Rockford, Doran served in many administrative, judicial, and pastoral capacities. He returned to Rome in 1975 to complete a Doctor of Canon Law degree in 1978. After coming back to Illinois, Doran served as chancellor, judicial vicar, vicar for catholic education, and rector of St. Peter's Cathedral in Rockford. In 1986, Pope John Paul II appointed him as a prelate auditor of the Sacred Roman Rota.

=== Bishop of Rockford ===
On April 19, 1994, Doran was appointed the eighth bishop of Rockford by John Paul II. He received his episcopal consecration on June 24, 1994, from Cardinal Joseph Bernardin, with Bishop Arthur O'Neill and Joseph Galante serving as co-consecrators. He selected as his episcopal motto: "Spes Anchora Vitae."

In 2000, Doran was named a member of the Supreme Tribunal of the Apostolic Signatura in Rome. He was also a member of the Congregation for the Clergy, the board of Catholics United for the Faith, a trustee of The Catholic University of America, and Institute on Religious Life.

In May 2002, Doran confirmed that Reverend Harlan Clapsaddle, a diocesan priest, had sexually abused three brothers when they were children during the 1970's. When the boys complained in 1996 to the diocese, it removed Clapsaddle immediately after an investigation. The family said they urged Doran at that time to report Clapsaddle to the police and search for other victims, but he instead told them to stay silent about it. The brothers each received a $27,000 cash settlement in 1997.

=== Retirement ===
Doran's resignation as bishop, which he submitted on his 75th birthday, was accepted by Pope Benedict XVI on March 20, 2012. He was succeeded by Monsignor David Malloy. Thomas Doran died on September 1, 2016.

== Views ==
=== Tridentine mass ===
Doran was one of the earliest post-Vatican II proponents of the Tridentine Mass. Before the publication Summorum Pontificum, Doran was singled out in an article in The Wanderer as one of the few U.S. bishops "...who have been generous in the Ecclesia Dei indult application, as requested and emphasized repeatedly by the late Pope John Paul II".

=== Abortion ===
In August 2006, Doran denounced the rate of abortions in the United States, saying, "We shall soon outstrip the Nazis in doing human beings to death."

In late March 2009 Doran expressed his "dismay and outrage" at the decision of the University of Notre Dame to have President Barack Obama deliver its commencement speech and receive an honorary degree. He even suggested that Notre Dame change its name to "Northwestern Indiana Humanist University."

== See also ==
- Catholic Church hierarchy
- Catholic Church in the United States
- Historical list of the Catholic bishops of the United States
- List of Catholic bishops of the United States
- Lists of patriarchs, archbishops, and bishops

Catholic Church titles
Preceded by –	Bishop Emeritus of Rockford; 2012-2016	Succeeded by –
Preceded by Arthur Joseph O'Neill	Bishop of Rockford; 1994–2012	Succeeded by David John Malloy
