= Andrew Peter Wypych =

Polish-born prelate

His Excellency, The Most Reverend Andrew Peter Wypych
- Auxiliary Bishop Emeritus of Chicago; Titular Bishop of Naraggara
- See: Archdiocese of Chicago
- Appointed: June 13, 2011
- Installed: August 10, 2011
- Retired: September 19, 2023
- Other post: Titular Bishop of Naraggara

Orders
- Ordination: April 29, 1979 by Franciszek Macharski
- Consecration: August 10, 2011 by Francis George, Gustavo Garcia-Siller, and Józek Guzdek

Personal details
- Born: December 5, 1954 (age 71) Kazimierza Wielka, Poland
- Education: Major Seminary of the Archdiocese of Kraków; Papal Academy of Theology
- Motto: The love of Christ impels us

Styles of Andrew Peter Wypych
- Reference style: His Excellency; The Most Reverend
- Spoken style: Your Excellency
- Religious style: Bishop

Andrew Peter Wypych (born December 5, 1954) is a Polish-born prelate of the Roman Catholic Church who served as an auxiliary bishop and episcopal vicar of the Archdiocese of Chicago in Illinois from 2011 to 2023.

== Biography ==
=== Early life and education ===
Andrew Wypych was born in Kazimierza Wielka, Poland on December 5, 1954, to Henryka Luty and Julian Wypych. He had one brother who died in infancy. Wypych first attended the primary school in Dobieszowice then the secondary school, Liceum Ogólnokształcące, in Działoszyce. Wypych then entered the major seminary of the Archdiocese of Kraków.

In 1973, Wypych started his studies at the Papal Academy of Theology in Kraków, receiving a Bachelor of Philosophy degree in 1975 and a Master of Theology degree in 1979. On May 6, 1978, Wypych was ordained a deacon by then-Cardinal Karol Wojtyła.

=== Ordination and ministry ===
On April 29, 1979, Wypych was ordained to the priesthood by Cardinal Franciszek Macharski for the Archdiocese of Kraków. After his ordination, he served as an associate pastor in Kozy, Poland. In 1981, Wypych was transferred to a parish in Jawiszowice, Poland.

In April 1983, Wypych moved to Illinois to be closer to his mother, who had emigrated there in 1974. In 2011, he revealed in an interview that he had been unable to call his mother for years due to restrictions from the Polish Government of that era.

After arriving in the United States, the Archdiocese of Chicago assigned Wypych to Five Holy Martyrs Parish in Chicago. At the end of 1983, he was transferred to St. Giles Parish in Oak Park, Illinois. In 1985, Wypych became associate pastor of St. Ladislaus Parish in Chicago. Starting in July 1986, he went to St. Pancratius Parish in Chicago.

Having decided to stay in Chicago because of the need for priests, Wypych requested incardination, or transfer, to the Archdiocese of Chicago, which was granted in 1989. In 1996, he began serving also as pastor of Five Holy Martyrs Parish, an assignment that lasted until 1999. Wypych remained at St. Pancratius for 16 years as associate pastor, parochial administrator and pastor. In 2002, Wypych was appointed pastor of St. Francis Borgia Parish in Chicago. During this same time period, he also served as dean of Deanery IV-D and as a member of the archdiocesan college of consultors.

=== Auxiliary Bishop of Chicago ===
On June 13, 2011, Pope Benedict XVI named Wypych as an auxiliary bishop of Chicago and titular bishop of Naraggara. He received his episcopal consecration on August 10, 2011, from Cardinal Francis George, with Bishop Józek Guzdek from the Archdiocese of Białystok in Poland and Archbishop Gustavo Garcia-Siller as co-consecrators. As an auxiliary bishop, Wypych served as episcopal vicar for Vicariate V.

=== Retirement and legacy ===
Pope Francis accepted Wypych's resignation as auxiliary bishop on September 19, 2023. Wypych had resigned at age 68, seven years before the mandatory retirement age, for health reasons.
