= All Saints Cemetery =

All Saints Cemetery may refer to:

- All Saints Cemetery (Des Plaines, Illinois), United States
- All Saints Cemetery (Łódź), Poland
- Nunhead Cemetery, London Borough of Southwark, England
- Orthodox cemetery in Białystok (Jaroszówka), Poland

== See also ==
- All Saints Church (disambiguation)
