= John Raphael Hagan =

His Excellency, Most Reverend John R. Hagan
- Auxiliary Bishop of Cleveland
- Church: Catholic Church
- See: Titular See of Limata
- Appointed: April 27, 1946
- In office: May 28, 1946 - September 28, 1946

Orders
- Ordination: March 7, 1914 by Basilio Pompili
- Consecration: May 28, 1946 by Edward Francis Hoban

Personal details
- Born: February 26, 1890 Pittsburgh, Pennsylvania, US
- Died: September 28, 1946 (aged 56) Cleveland, Ohio, US

John Raphael Hagan (February 26, 1890 – September 28, 1946) was an American prelate of the Catholic Church in the United States. He served as auxiliary bishop of the Diocese of Cleveland in Ohio for four months in 1946. He previously served as the president of St. John College in Cleveland.

== Biography ==
=== Early life ===
John Hagan was born on February 26, 1890, in Pittsburgh, Pennsylvania, to Katherine (Foley) and John Hagan. When he was two years old, the family moved to Cleveland, Ohio. By the time the younger John Hagan graduated from St. Ignatius High School in Cleveland, he knew that he wanted to become a priest. The diocese sent Hagan to the Pontifical North American College, the seminary in Rome for Americans.

=== Priesthood ===
Hagan was ordained into the priesthood in Rome on March 7, 1914 by Cardinal Basilio Pompili.After his ordination, the diocese assigned Hagen as an assistant priest at St. Augustine Parish in Cleveland. He was transferred in 1916 to St. Patrick Parish in Cleveland. In 1921, he was posted to St. Mary Parish in Bedford, Ohio. Hagen was named superintendent of the Catholic schools in Cleveland by Bishop Joseph Schrembs in 1923.

For his high education, Hagen attended the University of Bonn in Germany and the Catholic University of America in Washington, D.C. He would receive a Doctorate of Sacred Theology and a Doctorate of Science in Education. During the early 1930s, Hagen worked to transform Sisters' College in Cleveland from a normal school for religious sisters into an accredited four-year teaching college. It became St. John College in 1935, with Hagen as its first president.

== Auxiliary Bishop of Cleveland ==
On April 27, 1946, Pope Pius XII appointed Hagan as the titular bishop of Limata and as auxiliary bishop of Cleveland. He was consecrated by Bishop Edward F. Hoban on May 28, 1946 at St. Agnes Church in Cleveland.. The principal co-consecrators were Bishops James A. McFadden of Youngstown and John P. Treacy of La Crosse.

Hagan served as an auxiliary bishop for four months. After contracting hepatitis, Hagen died after abdominal surgery in Cleveland on September 28, 1946, at age 56.
