= Raymond Peter Hillinger =

American prelate

His Excellency, The Most Reverend Raymond Peter Hillinger
- Bishop of Rockford
- See: Diocese of Rockford
- Predecessor: John Joseph Boylan
- Successor: Loras Thomas Lane
- Other post: Auxiliary Bishop of Chicago (1956 to 1971)

Orders
- Ordination: April 2, 1932 by George Mundelein
- Consecration: December 29, 1953 by Samuel Stritch

Personal details
- Born: May 2, 1904 Chicago, Illinois, USA
- Died: November 13, 1971 (aged 67) Glenview, Illinois, USA
- Denomination: Roman Catholic
- Education: St. Mary of the Lake Seminary

Raymond Peter Hillinger (May 2, 1904 – November 13, 1971) was an American prelate of the Roman Catholic Church. He served as a bishop of the Diocese of Rockford in Illinois (1954–1956) and as an auxiliary bishop of the Archdiocese of Chicago (1956–1971).

== Biography ==
=== Early life ===
Raymond Hillinger was born on May 2, 1904, in Chicago, Illinois, to Philip and Mary (née Neuses) Hillinger. After graduating from New Trier High School in Wilmette, Illinois, he studied at Archbishop Quigley Preparatory Seminary in Chicago and St. Mary of the Lake Seminary in Mundelein, Illinois.

=== Priesthood ===
Hillinger was ordained to the priesthood for the Archdiocese of Chicago by Cardinal George Mundelein on April 2, 1932. He then served as a curate at St. Aloysius Parish in Chicago until 1935, when he became a member of the archdiocesan Mission Band. Hillinger was appointed on June 2, 1950, as the rector of Angel Guardian Orphanage in the Rogers Park section of Chicago, serving there until 1953.

=== Bishop of Rockford ===
On November 3, 1953, Hillinger was appointed as the fourth bishop of Rockford by Pope Pius XII. He received his episcopal consecration at Holy Name Cathedral in Chicago on December 29, 1953, from Cardinal Samuel Stritch, with Bishops Martin McNamara and William O'Connor serving as co-consecrators. He was installed at St. James Pro-Cathedral in Rockford on January 14, 1954. By 1955, Hillinger's health had started to deteriorate. In November 1955, Stritch announced the appointment of Monsignor Andrew J. Burns, the vicar general, as administrator of the diocese.

=== Auxiliary Bishop of Chicago ===
On June 27, 1956, Pope Pius XII named Hillinger as an auxiliary bishop of Chicago and titular bishop of Derbe. He also became the pastor of St. Mel-Holy Ghost Parish in Chicago. Hillinger confirmed future Bishop Daniel R. Jenky and ordained the future Cardinal Francis George to the priesthood.

Speaking to the first National Catholic Conference for Interracial Justice at Loyola University Chicago in September 1958, Hillinger declared that those who oppose the Catholic Church's stand against racial discrimination are "simply are not Catholic, and there are no two ways about it." On July 25, 1960, Hillinger offered the invocation at the opening of the 1960 Republican National Convention in Chicago.

=== Retirement and legacy ===
Hillinger retired as auxiliary bishop of Chicago in 1968. Raymond Hillinger died in Glenview, Illinois, on November 13, 1971, after a long illness. His body lay in state in the chapel at Holy Name Cathedral.

Catholic Church titles
Preceded by John Joseph Boylan	Bishop of Rockford; 1954–1956	Succeeded by Loras Thomas Lane
