= Theology on Tap =

Catholic young adult ministry

Theology on Tap is a program of lectures sponsored by a number of local Catholic dioceses. The lectures, which are often given by noted spiritual leaders and religious academics, address current topics in religion and theology, and are notable and sometimes controversial for their venue, which is normally a bar or restaurant. The concept has become common among other Christian denominations, particularly Episcopalians, Lutherans, Anglicans, and some Presbyterian, Methodist, and progressive Baptist churches.

== History ==
The series was co-founded in June 1981 in Arlington Heights, Illinois, by Father John Cusick, resident of Old St. Patrick's Parish and director of the archdiocese's Young Adult ministry, and Father Jack Wall, as the result of comments made by a recent college graduate who was "concerned about his personal identity and finding meaning in life."

Lecture topics have included the sacrament of reconciliation (commonly referred to as confession), Christian values, faith and work, relationship issues, small faith communities, decision making or discernment, embryonic stem-cell research, religious fundamentalism, the relevance of the church in the modern world and to public policy, and women's role in the church.

== Reach ==
Since its inception, the program has spread to more than 180 parishes and dioceses and at least six other countries, including Canada, Italy, Taiwan, the Philippines, Ireland, Australia and Hong Kong.

== Controversy ==
Theology on Tap exhibits significant theological differences with some churches and temperance societies like the Woman's Christian Temperance Union (compare Christianity and alcohol). Advocates for Theology on Tap, however, have defended the concept, calling it, among other things, the practice of "bringing the faith to where the people are." The fact that the lectures are open to the public is also hoped to bring in a broad audience; one organizer has stated that the goal of the lectures is "to reach out to people primarily in their 20s and 30s that may have strayed from their faith."

== Notable advocates ==
At least one high-level church leader has embraced the idea with a sense of humor. On October 17, 2006, Washington Archbishop Donald Wuerl responded to a Theology on Tap gathering's applause by saying "That's the warmest welcome I've ever received in a pub ... That's the first welcome I've ever received in a pub."

Cardinals Justin Rigali, Joseph Bernardin, Francis George, Seán Patrick O'Malley, George Pell and Archbishops J. Peter Sartain and George Hugh Niederauer have also led and/or addressed program gatherings.
