= Arthur Joseph O'Neill =

American bishop (1917–2013)

His Excellency, The Most Reverend Arthur Joseph O'Neill
- Bishop of Rockford
- Church: Roman Catholic Church
- See: Diocese of Rockford
- In office: October 11, 1968 – April 19, 1994
- Predecessor: Loras Thomas Lane
- Successor: Thomas G. Doran

Orders
- Ordination: March 27, 1943 by John Joseph Boylan
- Consecration: October 11, 1968 by Gerald Thomas Bergan

Personal details
- Born: December 14, 1917 East Dubuque, Illinois, US
- Died: April 27, 2013 (aged 95) Rockford, Illinois, US
- Motto: Ut Omnes Unum Sint (They may all be one)

Arthur Joseph O'Neill (December 14, 1917 – April 27, 2013) was an American prelate of the Roman Catholic Church. He served as bishop of the Diocese of Rockford in Illinois from 1968 to 1994.

== Biography ==
=== Early life ===
Arthur O'Neill was born on December 14, 1917, in East Dubuque, Illinois, to Leslie and Clara Runde O'Neill. After attending the St. Mary Parish School, O'Neill entered Columbia Academy in Dubuque, Iowa.

In 1935, O'Neill began studying the classics at Columbia College in Dubuque. After two years, he traveled in 1937 to Baltimore, Maryland, to study philosophy and theology at St. Mary Seminary, finishing in 1943.

=== Priesthood ===
O'Neill was ordained to the priesthood on March 27, 1943, for the Diocese of Rockford by Bishop John Joseph Boylan. After his ordination, the diocese assigned O'Neill as an assistant pastor at St. James Pro-Cathedral in Rockford, Illinois. In 1954, O'Neill was appointed editor of The Observer, the diocesan newspaper. That same year, the diocese named him as administrator for St. Thomas Aquinas Parish in Freeport, Illinois. Three years later, he became its pastor. Pope John XXIII elevated O'Neill to the rank of papal chamberlain in 1963. Contemporary accounts described O'Neill as a compassionate man who enjoyed speaking with parishioners.

=== Bishop of Rockford ===
Pope Paul VI appointed O'Neill as bishop of Rockford on August 19, 1968. He was consecrated a bishop at St. James Pro-Cathedral in Rockford, Illinois, by Archbishop Gerald Bergan on October 11, 1968.

Pope John Paul II accepted O'Neill's resignation as bishop of Rockford on April 19, 1994. O'Neill died on April 27, 2013, in Rockford at age 95.

Catholic Church titles
Preceded by Loras Thomas Lane	Bishop of Rockford; 1968–1994	Succeeded by Thomas G. Doran
