= Francis George =

American Catholic bishop and cardinal (1937–2015)

His Eminence Francis Eugene George OMI
- Cardinal; Archbishop Emeritus of Chicago
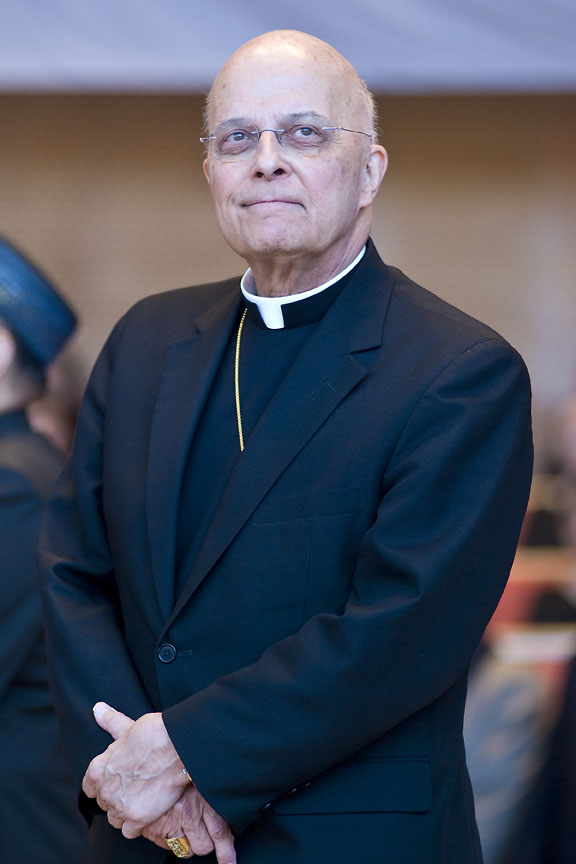
- Cardinal George at the May 2011 inauguration of Mayor Rahm Emanuel
- See: Chicago
- Appointed: April 8, 1997
- Installed: May 7, 1997
- Term ended: November 18, 2014
- Predecessor: Joseph Bernardin
- Successor: Blase J. Cupich
- Other post: Cardinal-Priest of S. Bartolomeo all'Isola
- Previous posts: President of the United States Conference of Catholic Bishops (2007–2010); Archbishop of Portland (1996–1997); Bishop of Yakima (1990–1996)

Orders
- Ordination: December 21, 1963 by Raymond Peter Hillinger
- Consecration: September 21, 1990 by Agostino Cacciavillan
- Created cardinal: February 21, 1998 by John Paul II
- Rank: Cardinal-Priest

Personal details
- Born: Francis Eugene George; January 16, 1937 Chicago, Illinois, U.S.
- Died: April 17, 2015 (aged 78) Chicago, Illinois, U.S.
- Buried: All Saints Cemetery, Des Plaines, Illinois
- Denomination: Catholic
- Parents: Francis J. and Julia R. (nee McCarthy) George
- Education: Our Lady of the Snows Seminary; University of Ottawa; Catholic University of America; Pontifical Urbaniana University
- Motto: Christo Gloria in Ecclesia (To Christ be Glory in the Church; cf. Ephesians 3:21)

Styles of Francis George
- Reference style: His Eminence
- Spoken style: Your Eminence
- Informal style: Cardinal

Ordination history of Francis George
History
Priestly ordination
- Ordained by: Bishop Raymond Peter Hillinger
- Date: December 21, 1963
- Place: St. Pascal's Church, Chicago
Episcopal consecration
- Principal consecrator: Archbishop Agostino Cacciavillan (Apos. Pro-Nunc. USA)
- Co-consecrators: Bishops Roger Lawrence Schwietz, O.M.I., and William Skylstad
- Date: September 21, 1990
Episcopal succession
Bishops consecrated by Francis George as principal consecrator
- Joseph Perry: June 29, 1998
- George Joseph Lucas: December 13, 1999
- Jerome Edward Listecki: January 8, 2001
- Francis Joseph Kane: March 19, 2003
- Thomas John Paprocki: March 19, 2003
- Gustavo García-Siller: March 19, 2003
- George James Rassas: February 2, 2006
- Alberto Rojas: August 10, 2011
- Andrew Peter Wypych: August 10, 2011
- David John Malloy: May 14, 2012

Francis Eugene George OMI (January 16, 1937 – April 17, 2015) was an American Catholic prelate who served as Archbishop of Chicago from 1997 to 2014. He previously served as Bishop of Yakima and Archbishop of Portland in Oregon. A member of the Missionary Oblates of Mary Immaculate, George was created a cardinal by Pope John Paul II in 1998. He served as president of the United States Conference of Catholic Bishops (USCCB) from 2007 to 2010.

On September 20, 2014, Pope Francis accepted George's resignation and appointed Bishop Blase J. Cupich to succeed him as Archbishop of Chicago. George was diagnosed with cancer in 2006 and died from the disease in 2015.

== Early life ==
Francis George was born on January 16, 1937, in Chicago, Illinois, to Francis J. and Julia R. (née McCarthy) George. He had an older sister, Margaret. He received his early education at the parochial school of St. Pascal Parish in Chicago's Northwest Side.

George contracted polio at age 13, leaving him with a permanent limp. Archbishop Quigley Preparatory Seminary in Chicago rejected George for admission due to his limp. He instead enrolled at St. Henry Preparatory Seminary in Belleville, Illinois, a high school seminary of the Missionary Oblates of Mary Immaculate. He joined the Oblates on August 14, 1957. He continued his studies at the Oblates novitiate in Godfrey, Illinois, before entering Our Lady of the Snows Seminary in Pass Christian, Mississippi.

George was then sent to study theology at the University of Ottawa in Canada. He made his solemn vows as a member of the Oblates on September 8, 1961.

== Career ==
=== Priesthood ===
On December 21, 1963, George was ordained to the priesthood for the Oblates by Bishop Raymond Hillinger at St. Pascal Church in Chicago. After his ordination, he received a Bachelor of Theology degree in Ottawa in 1964.

George then entered the Catholic University of America in Washington, D.C., receiving a Master of Theology degree in 1965. George then taught philosophy at Our Lady of the Snows Seminary (1964 to 1969), Tulane University in New Orleans, Louisiana (1968), and Creighton University in Omaha, Nebraska (1969 to 1973).

During his teaching assignments, George earned a Doctor of Philosophy degree in American philosophy from Tulane University in 1970, and a Master of Theology degree from the University of Ottawa in 1971. He served as provincial superior of the Midwestern Province for the Oblates in Saint Paul, Minnesota, from 1973 until 1974, when he became the Oblates vicar general. Based in Rome, George served as vicar general for 12 years. He obtained a Doctor of Sacred Theology degree from the Pontifical Urbaniana University in 1988, with a thesis entitled: "Inculturation and communion".

George returned to the United States, where he served as coordinator of the Circle of Fellows at the Center for the Study of Faith and Culture in Cambridge, Massachusetts (1987 to 1990).

=== Bishop of Yakima ===
On July 10, 1990, George was appointed the fifth bishop of Yakima by Pope John Paul II. He received his episcopal consecration on September 21, 1990, from Archbishop Agostino Cacciavillan, with Bishops Roger Schwietz and William S. Skylstad serving as co-consecrators, at Holy Family Church in Yakima. George took as his episcopal motto: Christo Gloria in Ecclesia (Latin: "To Christ be Glory in the Church").

George served as bishop of Yakima for five and a half years. As a member of the USCCB, he served as chair of the Commission for Bishops and Scholars (1992 to 1994), and as a consultant to the Committees on Evangelization (1991 to 1993), Hispanic Affairs (1994 to 1997), and Science and Values (1994 to 1997).

George was an episcopal advisor to the Cursillo Movement (Region XII) from 1990 to 1997, and episcopal moderator of the National Catholic Office for Persons with Disabilities from 1990 to 2008. He was a papal appointee to the 1994 World Synod of Bishops on Consecrated Life, and attended the Ninth Ordinary Assembly of the Synod of Bishops in Vatican City in 1994.

=== Archbishop of Portland ===
Coat of arms as Archbishop of Portland in Oregon

On April 30, 1996, George was appointed the ninth archbishop of Portland in Oregon by John Paul II. He was installed on the following May 27 at St. Mary's Cathedral of the Immaculate Conception in Portland, Oregon. During his brief tenure, he led the archdiocese's response to a tape recording by the Lane County jail of an inmate's sacramental confession; the Ninth Circuit Court of Appeals later ruled that the tape recording was an unconstitutional and illegal act.

=== Archbishop of Chicago ===
Coat of arms as cardinal and archbishop of Chicago

On April 8, 1997, John Paul II appointed George as the eighth archbishop of Chicago, filling the vacancy left by the death of Cardinal Joseph Bernardin on November 14, 1996. George was the first native Chicagoan to become archbishop there. On May 7, 1997, Apostolic Pro-Nuncio Agostino Cacciavillan installed George as archbishop of Chicago in Holy Name Cathedral in Chicago.

On January 18, 1998, John Paul II announced George's elevation to the College of Cardinals with the title of cardinal-priest of Basilica of San Bartolomeo all'Isola in Rome. His elevation occurred at the consistory at the Vatican on February 21.

George addressed the archdiocese's annual Theology on Tap gathering in 1997. In his invitation to the event, he wrote,

"You are very important members of the Church. Your energy, talent and faith will give me much help as together we build up our local Church to be a vital presence in the Chicago area. Together we can continue the mission of Jesus Christ to bring the Gospel of love, forgiveness and holiness to all the places where we live and encounter others."

As a cardinal elector, George participated in the 2005 papal conclave that selected Pope Benedict XVI and the papal conclave of 2013 that selected Pope Francis. In 2009, George met with newly elected U.S. President Barack Obama. In 2010, George finished his three-year presidency of the USCCB.

In 2011, George terminated the foster care program of Catholic Charities in the archdiocese. The State of Illinois had ruled that it would stop funding any charities that disqualified same-sex couples as foster care providers or adoptive parents. George refused to comply with this new requirement.

== Viewpoints ==
=== Interfaith relations ===
In 2007, George asked Jewish theologians to reconsider descriptions of Jesus in the Talmud as a "bastard". In turn, Catholic theologians should examine a softening of traditional Catholic prayers calling for the conversion of Jews to Christianity. In 2009, he condemned comments made by Richard Williamson denying the existence of the Holocaust, calling his statements "deeply offensive and utterly false".

=== Religious freedom ===
In February 2010, George spoke at Brigham Young University in Provo, Utah, about the need for Catholics and members of the Church of Jesus Christ of Latter-day Saints (LDS) to protect religious freedom.

"In recent years, Catholics and members of The Church of Jesus Christ of Latter-day Saints have stood more frequently side by side in the public square to defend human life and dignity,"

George also praised the LDS for its efforts to combat poverty, pornography and same-sex marriage. George further outlined in 2010 how he believed religious freedoms in the United States and other Western societies were endangered. In a speech to a group of priests, he said, "I expect to die in bed, my successor will die in prison and his successor will die a martyr in the public square. His successor will pick up the shards of a ruined society and slowly help rebuild civilization, as the church has done so often in human history." The quote was originally published online without the second sentence. In a 2014 interview, George said:

I didn't think there was any press there when I said it. I was talking to a couple of troubled priests who are worried about the secularization of our culture. I was telling them they should take the long view, step back, and renew their confidence in the providence of God. I was saying that even if the worst possible case scenario happens, we'll be okay. It was a mental game in the Kantian sense: ... let's imagine the worst thing that could happen. Instead of wringing your hands, let's imagine the worst possible scenario and then figure out what our role might be.

=== LGBTQ issues ===
When a new route was proposed for the 2012 annual Chicago Pride Parade that would take it past a Catholic church, George told an interviewer: "you don't want the Gay Liberation Movement to morph into something like the Ku Klux Klan, demonstrating in the streets against Catholicism." In response, LGBT advocates in Chicago called for George's resignation, but George said: "When the pastor's request for reconsideration of the plans was ignored, the organizers invited an obvious comparison to other groups who have historically attempted to stifle the religious freedom of the Catholic Church." Two weeks later, George apologized: "This has evidently wounded a good number of people. I have family members myself who are gay and lesbian, so it's part of our lives. So I'm sorry for the hurt." He said he was "speaking out of fear that I have for the church's liberty and I was reaching for an analogy which was very inappropriate ...Sometimes fear is a bad motivation." LGBT rights advocates accepted his apology.

In a 2013 pastoral letter to the Archdiocese of Chicago, George stated that the passage of same-sex marriage legislation in Illinois, which appeared imminent, would be

"acting against the common good of society. This proposed legislation will have long-term consequences because laws teach; they tell us what is socially acceptable and what is not, and most people conform to the dictates of their respective society, at least in the short run".

In September 2014, in his column in The Catholic New World, George alleged that the US Government and society were now approving sexual relationships so at odds with Catholic teaching that "the church's teaching on these issues is now evidence of intolerance for what the civil law upholds and even imposes" and that "those who do not conform to the official religion, we are warned, place their citizenship in danger." He also cited the requirements of the 2010 federal Affordable Care Act. He wrote that:

"It already means in some States that those who run businesses must conform their activities to the official religion or be fined, as Christians and Jews are fined for their religion in countries governed by Sharia law."

In September 2014, George met with a gay music director of a Catholic parish who had been fired after announcing his intention to marry his partner. The man said of the meeting: "I was just again grateful for the opportunity to meet with him, for him to know me, for him to hear my story. ...I think the overall tone was again pastoral."

== Extra-diocesan posts ==
=== Vatican appointments ===
John Paul II appointed George to several offices of the Roman Curia:

- Congregation for Divine Worship and the Discipline of the Sacraments
- Congregation for Institutes of Consecrated Life and Societies of Apostolic Life
- Congregation for the Evangelization of Peoples
- Pontifical Commission for the Cultural Heritage of the Church
- Congregation for the Oriental Churches
- Pontifical Council for Culture
- Pontifical Council Cor Unum

George was appointed by John Paul II to the 1994 World Synod of Bishops on Consecrated Life and as a delegate and one of two special secretaries at the Synod of Bishops for America in 1997. In 2010, Benedict XVI appointed George to the Pontifical Commission for the Study of the Organizational and Economic Problems of the Holy See.

=== U.S. Conference of Catholic Bishops ===
George served as USCCB vice president (2004–2007) and president (2007–2010). He served as a member, and later as a consultant, to the Committee on Divine Worship; he was also a consultant to the Committee on Doctrine and Pro-Life Activities and the Subcommittee on Lay Ministry. George had also served on the committees on Doctrine, on Latin America, on Missions, on Religious Life, the American Board of Catholic Missions, and on World Missions; on the Ad Hoc Committee to Oversee the Use of the Catechism and the Subcommittee on Campus Ministry.

George was chair of the Committee for Bishops and Scholars from 1992 to 1994, and of the Committee on Liturgy from 2001 to 2004, and a consultant to the Committees on Evangelization (1991–1993), Hispanic Affairs (1994–1997), Science and Values (1994–1997), and African American Catholics (1999–2002). He was the representative to the International Commission on English and the Liturgy from 1997 to 2006.

George was a USCCB delegate to the 2001 World Synod of Bishops and was also elected to the Council for the World Synod in 2001, he served as a delegate to the 2008 World Synod of Bishops on "The Word of God in the Life and Mission of the Church.

=== Catholic organizations ===
As archbishop, George was the de facto chancellor of the University of St. Mary of the Lake/Mundelein Seminary in Mundelein, Illinois. He served as chancellor from 1997 to 2014 of the Catholic Church Extension Society. George served as episcopal liaison to the Catholic Campus Ministry Association executive board and was episcopal moderator for the Ministry of Transportation Chaplains from 2003. He also served as episcopal advisor to the Cursillo Movement, Region XII, from 1990 to 1997. From 1990 to 2008, George was episcopal moderator and board member of the National Catholic Office for Persons with Disabilities. In July 2011, George served as a catechist at the August 2011 World Youth Day celebration in Madrid, Spain.

George served on the board of trustees of the Catholic University of America and the Papal Foundation. In 1994, George became a board member of the National Catholic Bioethics Center in Philadelphia, Pennsylvania. He served on the board of directors of the Basilica of the National Shrine of the Immaculate Conception in Washington, D.C., and a member of the Kohl McCormick Early Childhood Teaching Awards advisory board. He served on the board of directors of Oblate Media in Belleville, Illinois.

=== Associations and honors ===
George served as conventual chaplain ad honorem of the Federal Association of the Sovereign Military Order of Malta and grand prior of the North Central Lieutenancy of the United States for the Order of the Holy Sepulchre of Jerusalem. He was made a Bailiff Grand Cross of Honor & Devotion for Cardinals in 1998. George belonged to the American Catholic Philosophical Association, the American Society of Missiologists, and the Catholic Commission on Intellectual and Cultural Affairs.

George received an honorary doctorate from Lewis University in Romeoville, Illinois, in 2014. That same year, George received the Medal of Merit, the highest honor of the City of Chicago.

== Retirement ==
On January 16, 2012, George submitted his letter of resignation as archbishop of Chicago to Benedict XVI, having reached the mandatory retirement age of 75. He named Monsignor Peter F. Śnieg, rector of St. Joseph's Seminary at Loyola University Chicago, as moderator of the curia for the archdiocese. At that time, George anticipated remaining in office for two to three years.

In a 2014 interview on his retirement, George said:

I've always said that the only thing I'd like people to remember about me is that he tried to be a good bishop. I think I have been a good bishop, in many ways, and I take some pride in at least having tried my best. That's enough. On the liturgical stuff, I knew it had to be done and that I was in a particularly key spot to see to that what's most important in handing on the traditions of the Church, namely our way of prayer and our liturgy, was going to be more faithfully presented to the people. That meant a lot to me, because the worship of God is the most important thing we do.

In the same 2014 interview, when asked if he saw himself as conservative, George replied:

The liberal/conservative thing, I think, is destructive of the Church's mission and her life. I've said that publicly a lot at times. You're taking a definition that comes out of nowhere, as far as we're concerned, it's a modern distinction, and making it the judgment of the Church's life. It's because we're lazy. You put a label on people, you put a label on something, and it saves you the trouble of thinking.

=== Final illness ===
George was diagnosed with an aggressive but localized form of bladder cancer in 2006. In August 2012, the archdiocese announced that his bladder cancer had metastasized to his kidney and liver, and that he would undergo chemotherapy. The cancer returned in March 2014 and George started another round of chemotherapy. He was hospitalized for several days at Loyola University Medical Center in Chicago after showing flu-like symptoms and signs of dehydration. In April 2014, on medical advice, George canceled a trip to the Vatican. George and the apostolic nuncio to the United States, Archbishop Carlo Maria Vigano, agreed that the Vatican should start looking for his successor.

In August 2014, George entered a clinical trial of a new cancer treatment drug at the University of Chicago. George left the trial at the end of 2014 due to the lack of positive results. On January 30, 2015, George told reporters that he was now receiving palliative care. On March 3, George entered Loyola University Medical Center for tests and was then discharged. On March 28, he was readmitted to the hospital for pain management and hydration. On April 3, he was released. On September 20, 2014, Pope Francis accepted George's resignation as archbishop of Chicago and named Bishop Blase J. Cupich as his successor.

Francis George died of cancer on April 17, 2015, in the archbishop's residence in Chicago at age 78.

=== Memorial services ===
A Mass of Christian burial for George was celebrated on April 23, 2015, at Holy Name Cathedral. The burial service took place at All Saints Cemetery in Des Plaines, Illinois, where he was buried in the George family plot per his wishes. Archbishop J. Peter Sartain gave the homily at George's request. Archbishop Roger L. Schwietz led the rites at the end of the Mass. Nine cardinals, Archbishop Vigano, and over fifty bishops concelebrated the mass.

On April 25, 2015, a memorial Mass for George was celebrated in Rome at his titular church, San Bartolomeo all'Isola. Fr Andrew Liaugminas, ordained by George in 2010, served as the homilist. Cardinal Bernard Law presided over the service, joined by Cardinals James Harvey, George Pell, and J. Francis Stafford.

A "Month's Mind Mass" was celebrated on Sunday, May 17, 2015, at Holy Name Cathedral. Rector Dan Mayall was the principal celebrant and homilist.

== Legacy ==
=== Tributes ===
One of George's wishes had been to visit Pope Francis before he died, which proved impossible. While George expressed his overall agreement with and obedience to Francis, he said he was confused by what signals Francis was sending. Upon hearing of his death, Francis sent a telegram of condolence to Cupich:

Saddened to learn of the death of Cardinal Francis E. George, Archbishop Emeritus of Chicago, I offer heartfelt condolences to you, and to the clergy, religious and lay faithful of the Archdiocese. With gratitude for Cardinal George's witness of consecrated life as an Oblate of Mary Immaculate, his service to the Church's educational apostolate and his years of episcopal ministry in the Churches of Yakima, Portland and Chicago, I join you in commending the soul of this wise and gentle pastor to the merciful love of God, our heavenly Father. To all who mourn the late Cardinal in the sure hope of the Resurrection, I cordially impart my Apostolic Blessing as a pledge of consolation and peace in the Lord.

The Vatican Secretary of State, Cardinal Pietro Parolin, also sent Cupich a telegram of condolence.

The USCCB president, Archbishop Joseph Kurtz, paid tribute to George, a former USCCB president. Archbishops Gustavo Garcia-Siller, Jerome Listecki, Bishop Gerald Kicanas, Cardinal Timothy Dolan and Archbishop Wilton Gregory all sent their condolences

Chicago Mayor Rahm Emanuel stated:

"Cardinal Francis George led a remarkable life of faith and service. As Chicago's first native-born Archbishop, his journey took him full-circle from growing up in Portage Park to serving in far-flung missions around the globe, and eventually back home to shepherd the City of Chicago towards a better future. He lent his counsel to those in distress, his comfort to those in despair and he inspired us all with his courage in his final days. He could always be counted on to provide those granite qualities to the countless people who relied on them when it mattered the most."

Illinois Governor Bruce Rauner also commented on George:

"He shepherded the church through some of its most trying times, but leaves behind a strong community of faith that has tremendous positive impact on the people of Illinois, regardless of their creed."

== Publications ==
=== Books ===
- The Difference God Makes: A Catholic Vision of Faith, Communion, and Culture, was published in October 2009 by Crossroad Publishing Company.
- God in Action: How Faith in God Can Address the Challenges of the World, was published in May 2011 by Doubleday Religion.
- A Godly Humanism: Clarifying the Hope that Lies Within, published by CUA Press, was completed just nine days before his death in 2015.

=== Pastoral letters ===
- Becoming An Evangelizing People was released on November 21, 1997.
- Dwell in My Love, on the sinful and destructive nature of racism, was released on April 4, 2001.

=== Columns ===
George published a bi-monthly column in the archdiocesan newspaper, The Catholic New World, called "The Cardinal's Column".

=== Further reading ===
- Heinlein, Michael R. (2023), Glorifying Christ: The Life of Cardinal Francis E. George, O.M.I., Huntington Indiana USA, Our Sunday Visitor Publishing Division, p. 425, ISBN 9781681922522.

== See also ==
- Catholic Church hierarchy
- Catholic Church in the United States
- Historical list of the Catholic bishops of the United States
- List of Catholic bishops of the United States
- Lists of patriarchs, archbishops, and bishops

Catholic Church titles
Preceded by William S. Skylstad	Bishop of Yakima; 1990–1996	Succeeded by Carlos Arthur Sevilla
Preceded by William Levada	Archbishop of Portland; 1996–1997	Succeeded by John George Vlazny
Preceded by Joseph Bernardin	Archbishop of Chicago; 1997–2014	Succeeded by Blase J. Cupich
Preceded by Mario Revollo Bravo	Cardinal-Priest of San Bartolomeo all'Isola; 1998–2015	Succeeded by Blase J. Cupich
Preceded by William S. Skylstad	President of the United States Conference of Catholic Bishops; 2007–2010	Succeeded by Timothy M. Dolan
