= Diocese of Rockford =

Catholic diocese in northern Illinois

Diocese of Rockford Diœcesis Rockfordiensis
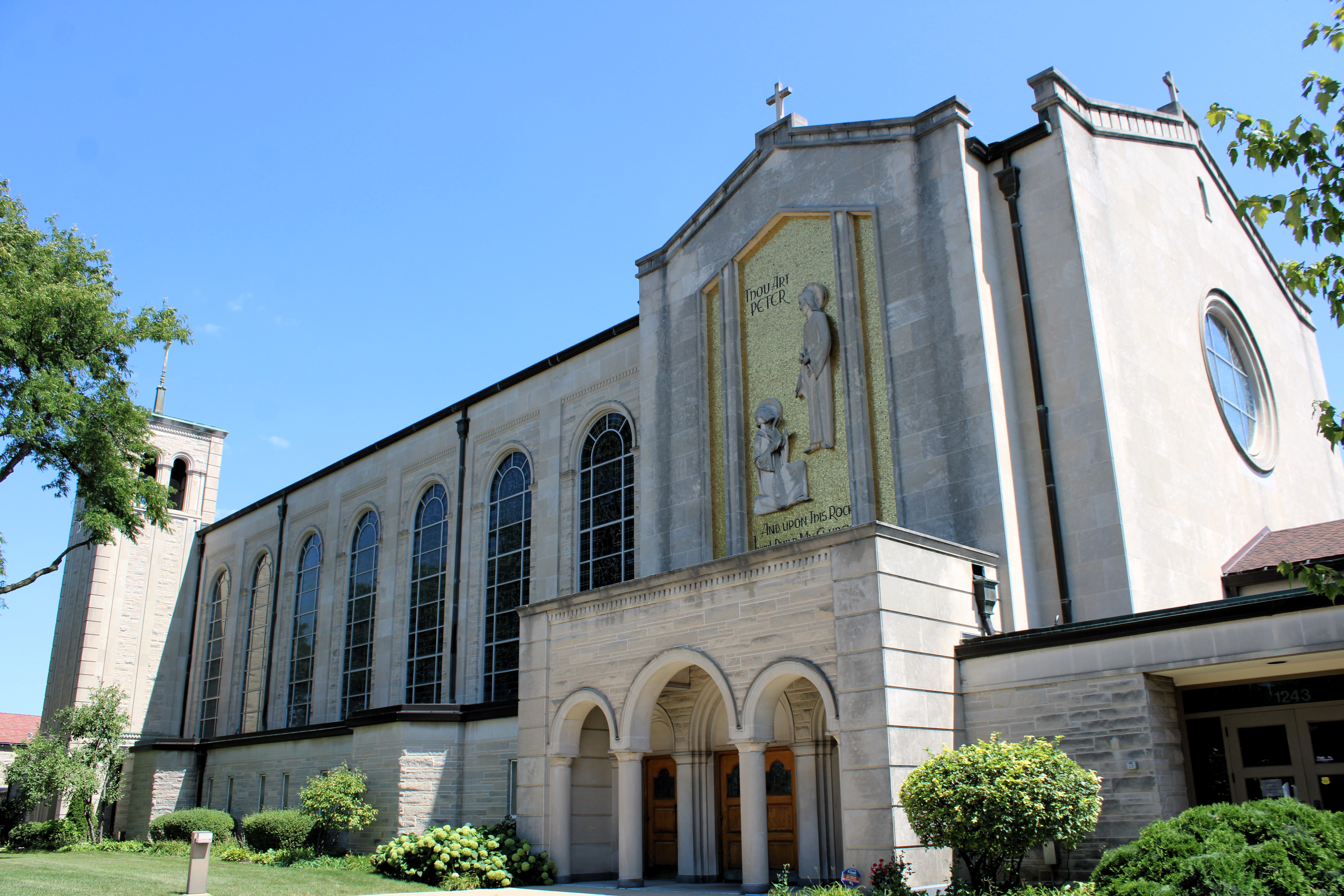
- Cathedral of St. Peter

- Coat of arms

Location
- Country: United States
- Territory: 11 counties in northwestern Illinois
- Ecclesiastical province: Chicago
- Metropolitan: Chicago
- Coordinates: 42.265808°N 88.963501°W

Statistics
- Area: 6,457 sq mi (16,720 km^{2})
- Population: Total; Catholics: (as of 2010); 1,665,000; 451,509 (27.1%)
- Parishes: 107

Information
- Denomination: Catholic
- Sui iuris church: Latin Church
- Rite: Roman Rite
- Established: September 23, 1908; 118 years ago
- Cathedral: Cathedral of Saint Peter
- Patron saint: Immaculate Conception
- Secular priests: 134

Current leadership
- Pope: Leo XIV
- Bishop: David John Malloy
- Metropolitan Archbishop: Blase J. Cupich

Map
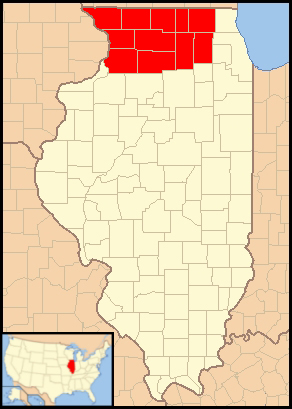

Website
- rockforddiocese.org

The Diocese of Rockford (Latin: Diœcesis Rockfordiensis) is a diocese of the Catholic Church in Northern Illinois in the United States. It is a suffragan diocese of the Archdiocese of Chicago. The mother church is the Cathedral of Saint Peter in the City of Rockford. David Malloy is the bishop.

== Territory ==
The Diocese of Rockford comprises the counties of Boone, Carroll, DeKalb, Jo Daviess, Kane, Lee, McHenry, Ogle, Stephenson, Whiteside and Winnebago.

== History ==
=== 1700 to 1800 ===
During the 17th century, present day Illinois was part of the French colony of New France. The Diocese of Quebec, which had jurisdiction over the colony, sent numerous French missionaries to the region. It was estimated that 15,000 to 20,000 Native American converts and French trappers and settlers throughout the region were tended to by these Jesuit missionaries.

After the British took control of New France in 1763, the Archdiocese of Quebec retained jurisdiction in the Illinois area. However, most of the French Catholics in the area migrated to Louisiana.

In 1776, the new United States claimed sovereignty over the area of Illinois. After the American Revolution ended in 1783, Pope Pius VI erected in 1784 the Prefecture Apostolic of the United States, encompassing the entire territory of the new nation. In 1785, the vicar apostolic, John Carroll, sent his first missionary to Illinois. In 1787, the Illinois area became part of the Northwest Territory of the United States. Pius VI created the Diocese of Baltimore, the first diocese in the United States, to replace the prefecture apostolic in 1789.

=== 1800 to 1907 ===
When the Vatican erected the Diocese of Bardstown in Kentucky in 1808, it gained jurisdiction over the Illinois area. The jurisdiction over northern Illinois shifted in 1834 to the Diocese of St. Louis. The first Catholic mass in Elgin was conducted by two French missionaries in 1837.

With the creation of the Diocese of Chicago in 1843, northern Illinois was transferred from the Diocese of St. Louis. The Rockford area would be part of the Diocese of Chicago, followed by the Archdiocese of Chicago, for the next 64 years.

In Elgin, the first Catholic church, St. Mary's, opened in 1851. That same year, Bishop James Van de Velde of Chicago purchased land for the first Catholic church in Aurora. The first Catholic church in Rockford was St. James, founded in 1853. The first parochial school in the city was started in 1855. The footprint of the diocese continued to expand during this time with the dedication of a parish church in DeKalb in 1861.

In 1899, the Sisters of the Third Order of St. Francis opened St. Anthony Hospital in Rockford. Today it is OSF Saint Anthony Medical Center. Saint Joseph Hospital in Elgin was founded in 1901.

=== 1907 to 1942 ===
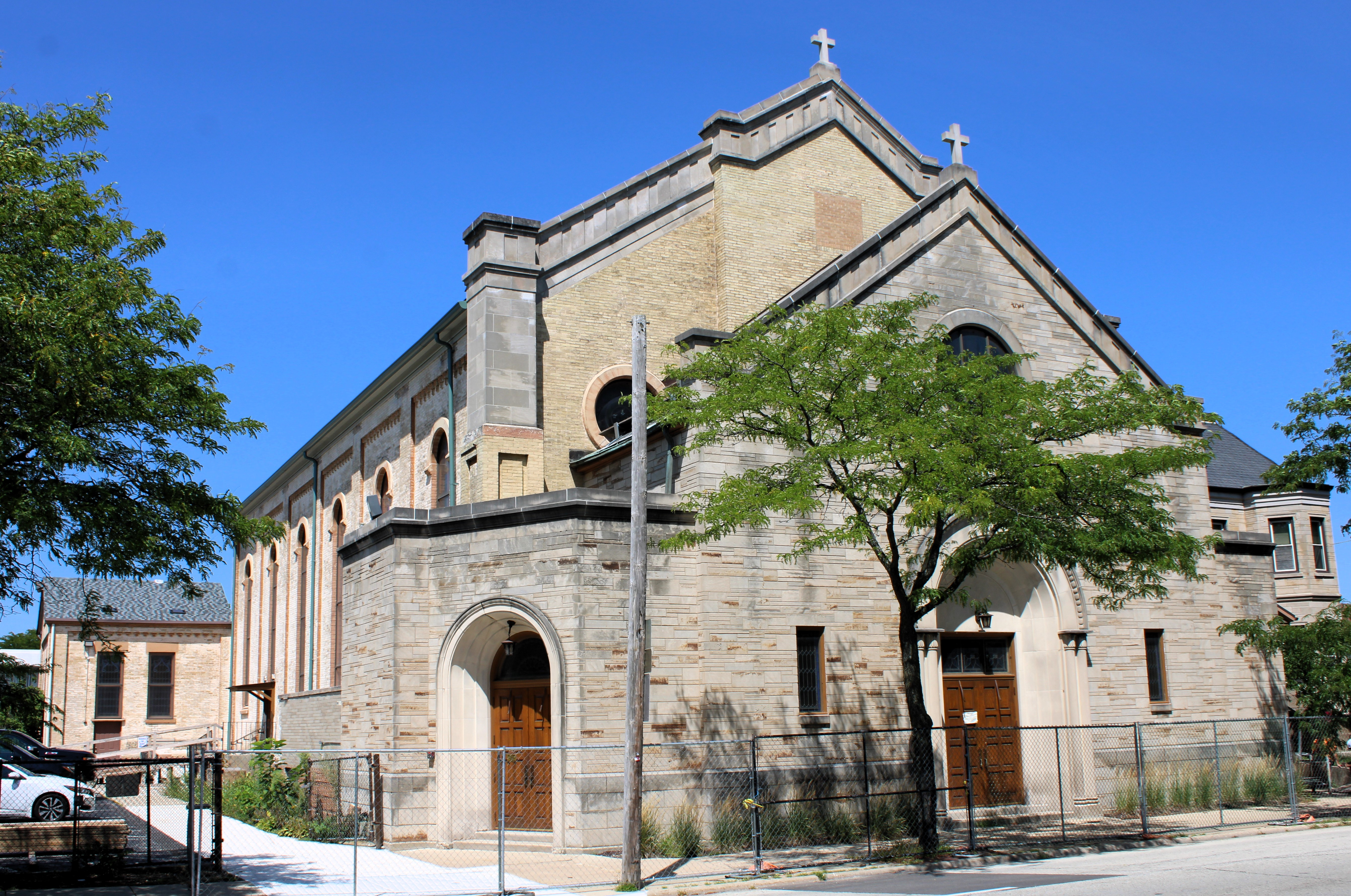
St. James Church in Rockford, the pro-cathedral until 1960 (2023)

Pope Pius X erected the Diocese of Rockford on September 27, 1907. Its territory of 12 counties was taken from the Archdiocese of Chicago. The pope appointed Auxiliary Bishop Peter Muldoon of Chicago as the first bishop of Rockford. With the 1917 entry of the United States into World War I, Muldoon ministered to soldiers and recruits at Camp Grant, the US Army facility in Rockford. He died in 1927.

Auxiliary Bishop Edward Hoban of Chicago was named by Pope Pius XI in 1928 as bishop of Rockford. During his tenure, Hoban opened many elementary and high schools in the diocese, modernized charitable institutions, and established a diocesan newspaper. In 1942, Pope Pius XII appointed Hoban as coadjutor bishop for the Diocese of Cleveland.

=== 1942 to present ===
The next bishop of Rockford was Monsignor John Boylan from the Diocese of Des Moines, appointed by Pius XII in 1942. During his tenure as bishop, Boylan was able to reduce the diocese's debt while adding new parishes and schools to meet population growth. In 1948, Pope Pius XII established the Diocese of Joliet and transferred Kendall County from Rockford to Joliet. After Boylan died in 1953, Pius named Raymond Hillinger of Chicago to replace him that same year Three years later, Hillinger was made auxiliary bishop in Chicago.

Auxiliary Bishop Loras Lane from the Archdiocese of Dubuque replaced Hillinger in 1956. Lane died in 1968; Pope Paul VI named Arthur O'Neill to take Lane's place.

In 1992, William Joffe, a diocesan priest, pleaded guilty to two counts of bank fraud and one count of interstate transportation of a fraudulent check and received one year in prison. He also embezzled $265,000 from his parish in McHenry County. He spent the money on a horse farm in Harvard, Illinois, and a resort and restaurant in Wisconsin. After his release from prison in 1992, Joffe was assigned to a new parish. However, after only a few months, Joffe was suspended from the priesthood in 1993.

Serving as bishop of Rockford for 26 years, O'Neill retired in 1994. Thomas G. Doran of Rockford was the next bishop, named by Pope John Paul II in 1994. On September 30, 2000, John Earl, a Rockford priest, drove his car into the Northern Illinois Health Clinic after the FDA had approved the drug RU-486, prescribed for medical abortions. He drew an ax before being forced to the ground by the building's owner, who fired two warning shots from a shotgun. Earl was sentenced to 30 months of probation and paid over $7,000 in fines and restitution, but remained a priest in good standing.

In 2002, Bishop Doran confirmed that Harlan Clapsaddle had sexually abused three brothers when they were minors in the 1970s. When the victims complained about the priest to the diocese in 1996, Clapsaddle was investigated and then removed from ministry. Each victim received a $27,000 cash settlement in 1997. Clapsaddle was permanently removed from ministry in 2002. Mark Campobello pleaded guilty in 2004 to two counts of aggravated criminal sexual abuse. Two women had accused him of indecent touching when they were 14 and 15 years old in 1999 and 2000. He was sentenced to eight years in prison. The Vatican laicized Campobello in 2005. The two victims reached a $2.2 million settlement with the diocese in 2007.

In 2011, the diocese ended its participation in state-funded adoptions and foster-care placements because the State of Illinois would no longer allow restriction to only heterosexual couples. Doran retired as bishop of Rockford in 2012. That same year, David Malloy of the Archdiocese of Milwaukee, named by John Paul II, became the next bishop. In November 2018, Bishop Malloy released a list of 15 clerics who had been accused of acts of sexual abuse from 1925 to 1991. In 2023, the Illinois Attorney General released a report on claiming that over 450 clergy in Illinois had abused nearly 2,000 minors since 1950. In June 2026, the diocese sued the State of Illinois, stating that the Illinois Human Rights Act prevented Catholic institutions from not hiring candidates who support abortion legalization.

== Bishops ==
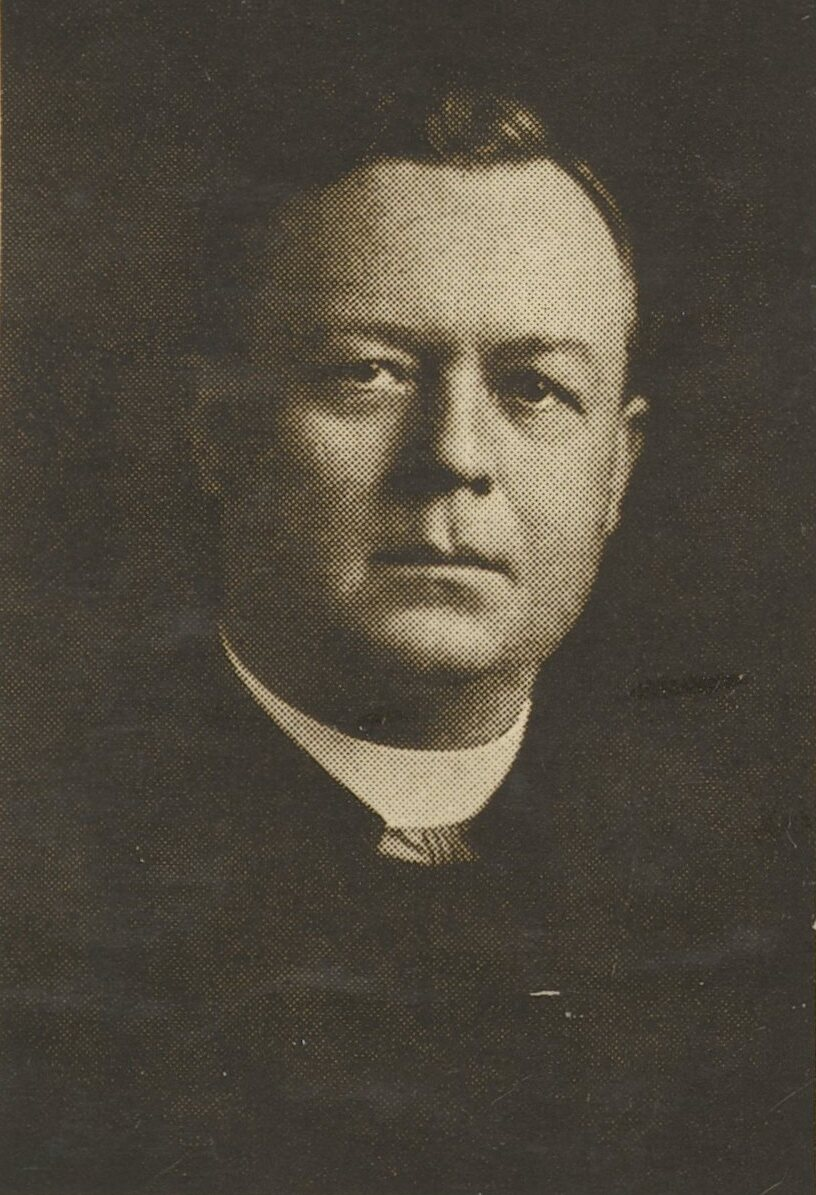
Bishop Muldoon (pre-1920)

=== Bishops of Rockford ===
1. Peter Muldoon (1908-1927)
2. Edward Francis Hoban (1928-1942), appointed Coadjutor Bishop and later Bishop of Cleveland
3. John Joseph Boylan (1942-1953)
4. Raymond Peter Hillinger (1953-1956), appointed Auxiliary Bishop of Chicago
5. Loras Thomas Lane (1956-1968)
6. Arthur Joseph O'Neill (1968-1994)
7. Thomas George Doran (1994-2012)
8. David John Malloy (2012–present)

=== Other diocesan priests who became bishops ===
- Leo Binz, appointed Coadjutor Bishop in 1942 and later Bishop of Winona, Coadjutor Archbishop and later Archbishop of Dubuque, and Archbishop of Saint Paul and Minneapolis
- Timothy Lawrence Doherty, appointed Bishop of Lafayette in Indiana in 2010
- David Kagan, appointed Bishop of Bismarck in 2011

== Education ==
As of 2026, the Diocese of Rockford had 29 elementary schools with approximately 6,200 students, eight high schools with about 2,572 students and 36,675 individuals attending religious education programs run by the parishes.

=== High schools ===
- Aquin Catholic Academy (junior-senior high campus) – Freeport
- Aurora Central Catholic High School – Aurora
- Boylan Catholic High School – Rockford
- Marian Central Catholic High School – Woodstock
- Marmion Academy – Aurora
- Newman Central Catholic High School – Sterling
- Rosary College Prep – Aurora
- St. Edward Central Catholic High School – Elgin
