= David John Malloy =

American Catholic prelate (born 1956)

His Excellency, The Most Reverend David J. Malloy S.T.D, J.C.L and D.D.
- Bishop of Rockford
- Church: Roman Catholicism
- See: Diocese of Rockford
- Appointed: March 20, 2012
- Installed: May 14, 2012
- Predecessor: Thomas G. Doran
- Previous post: General Secretary of the United States Conference of Catholic Bishops

Orders
- Ordination: July 1, 1983 by Rembert Weakland, O.S.B
- Consecration: May 14, 2012 by Francis George, Thomas G. Doran, and Jerome E. Listecki

Personal details
- Born: February 3, 1956 (age 70) Milwaukee, Wisconsin, US
- Education: Pontifical North American College; Pontifical Gregorian University; Pontifical University of St. Thomas Aquinas; Pontifical Ecclesiastical Academy, Marquette University
- Motto: Fides spes caritas (Faith, hope, love)

Styles of David J. Malloy
- Reference style: His Excellency; The Most Reverend
- Spoken style: Your Excellency
- Religious style: Bishop

David J. Malloy (born February 3, 1956) is an American prelate of the Roman Catholic Church who has served as the bishop of the Diocese of Rockford in Illinois since 2012.

== Biography ==
=== Early life and education ===
David Malloy was born on February 3, 1956, in Milwaukee, Wisconsin, the son of David and Mary Malloy. He has one sister and four brothers. He attended Christ the King Grade School in Wauwatosa, Wisconsin, then went to Wauwatosa East High School. After graduating from high school in 1974, Malloy entered Marquette University in Milwaukee. He received his Bachelor of Science degree in biology from Marquette in 1978.

Deciding to enter the priesthood, Malloy enrolled in 1978 at Saint Francis de Sales Seminary in Milwaukee to study theology. In 1979, he was sent to the Pontifical North American College in Rome.

=== Ordination and ministry ===
Malloy was ordained a priest on July 1, 1983, by Archbishop Rembert Weakland for the Archdiocese of Milwaukee in Rome. Malloy obtained a Licentiate of Dogmatic Theology from the Pontifical Gregorian University in Rome in 1984.

After returning to Wisconsin in 1984, the archdiocese assigned Malloy as the parochial vicar of Saint John Nepomuk Parish in Racine, Wisconsin. He returned to Rome in 1986 to attend the Pontifical Ecclesiastical Academy. During this period, he also received a Licentiate of Canon Law from the Pontifical University of St. Thomas Aquinas and a Doctor of Theology degree from the Gregorian University. Besides English, Malloy speaks Italian, Spanish and French.

Remaining in Rome, Malloy entered the Vatican Diplomatic Corps in 1990. His first assignment was as a secretary to the apostolic nuncio in Pakistan. In 1995, the Vatican sent him to Syria to the Apostolic Nunciature there for several months. Later that year, he was appointed as a member Permanent Observer Mission to the Holy See at the United Nations in New York City.

Malloy left the Diplomatic Corps in 1998 to become an official of the Prefecture of the Papal Household. On October 28, 2000, the Vatican named Malloy as a prelate of honor. Malloy returned to the United States to serve as associate general secretary of the United States Conference of Catholic Bishops (USCCB). In 2011, Malloy left the USCCB to become pastor of Saint Francis de Sales Parish in Lake Geneva, Wisconsin.

=== Bishop of Rockford ===
On March 20, 2012, Pope Benedict XVI appointed Malloy as bishop of Rockford. He was consecrated on May 14, 2012, by Cardinal Francis George. Bishop Thomas Doran, and Archbishop Jerome Listecki served as co-consecrators.

On November 15, 2018, Malloy released a list of diocesan clerics who had been accused of sexual abuse of minors from 1925 to 1991. In March 2019, Malloy revoked the priestly faculties of Reverend Joseph Jablonski, a priest of the Missionaries of the Sacred Heart. While ministering in the Diocese of San Bernardino in California in 2014, Jablonski allegedly made remarks to a young boy that constituted sexual grooming. The Diocese of San Bernardino immediately reported him to authorities and banned him from ministering in its parishes. When Jablonski moved to the Archdiocese of Chicago, the Missionaries did not notify the archdiocese or the Illinois dioceses about his record in California.

Malloy has been serving as chair of the USCCB Committee on International Justice and Peace. In July 2023, he expressed concern over the Biden Administration sending cluster munitions to the Ukrainian Ground Forces for use in the war with Russia.

== See also ==
- Catholic Church hierarchy
- Catholic Church in the United States
- Historical list of the Catholic bishops of the United States
- List of Catholic bishops of the United States
- Lists of patriarchs, archbishops, and bishops

== Episcopal succession ==
Catholic Church titles
Preceded by Thomas G. Doran	Bishop of Rockford; 2012–present	Succeeded by Incumbent
