= Peter Muldoon =

American prelate

His Excellency, The Right Reverend Peter James Muldoon
- Bishop of Rockford; Titular bishop of Tamassus
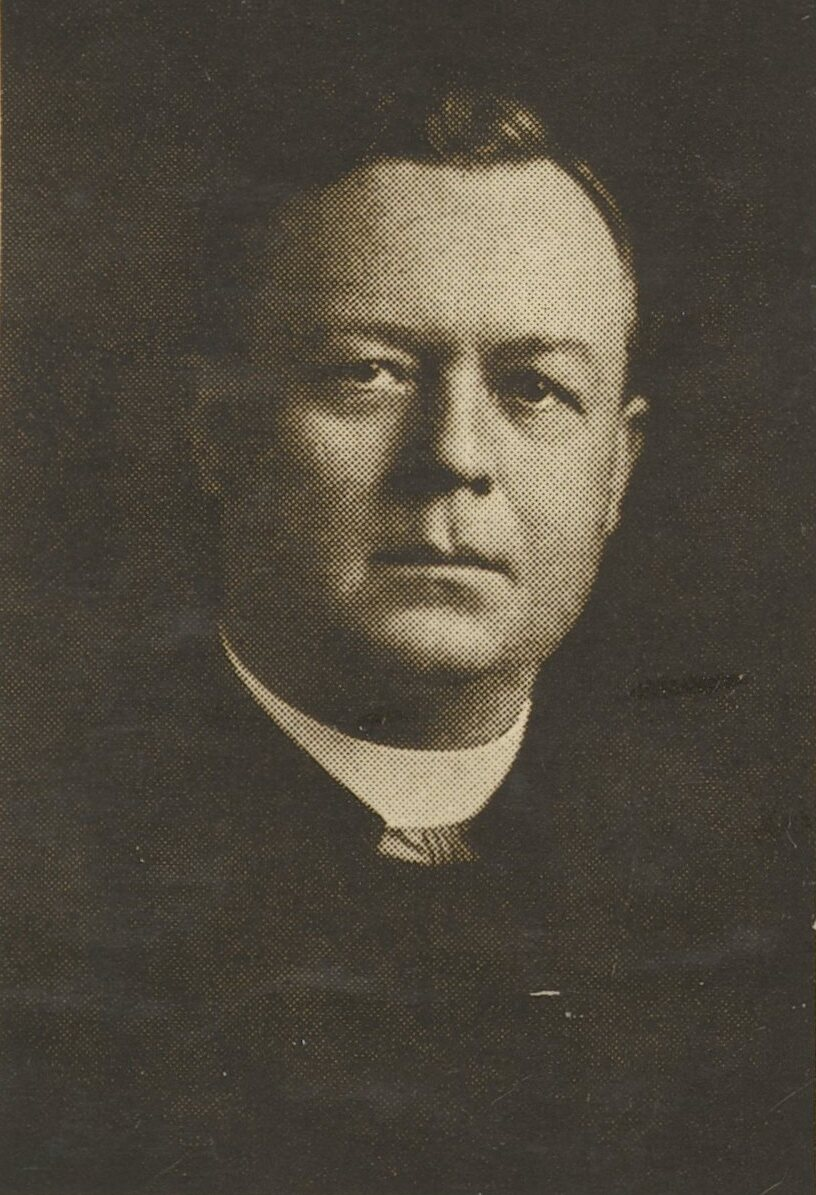
- See: Diocese of Rockford
- In office: December 15, 1908; October 8, 1927
- Successor: Edward Francis Hoban
- Other posts: Auxiliary Bishop of Chicago; 1901 to 1908

Orders
- Ordination: December 18, 1886 by John Loughlin
- Consecration: July 25, 1901 by Sebastiano Martinelli

Personal details
- Born: October 10, 1863 Columbia, California, US
- Died: October 8, 1927 (aged 63) Rockford, Illinois, US
- Denomination: Roman Catholic
- Education: St. Mary's College; St. Mary's Seminary
- Motto: Pro fide et patria (For faith and country)

Peter James Muldoon (October 10, 1863 – October 8, 1927) was an American prelate of the Roman Catholic Church. He served as the first bishop of the new Diocese of Rockford in Illinois from 1908 until his death in 1927. He previously served as an auxiliary bishop of the Archdiocese of Chicago in Illinois from 1901 to 1908.

Muldoon served as chair of the National Catholic War Council during World War I and was a leader of the National Catholic Welfare Council during the 1920s.

== Biography ==
=== Early life ===
Peter Muldoon was born on October 10, 1863, in Columbia, California, to Irish immigrants John and Catherine (Coughlin) Muldoon. He was the oldest child in a family of five children. Muldoon attended public schools in Stockton, California, then in 1877 entered St. Mary's College in St. Mary, Kentucky, where his uncle, the Reverend John Coughlin, was a faculty member. In 1881, Muldoon enrolled at St. Mary's Seminary in Baltimore, Maryland. When John Coughlin was transferred to the Archdiocese of Chicago, Muldoon applied to be incardinated there.

Muldoon was ordained a priest by Bishop John Loughlin for the Archdiocese of Chicago on December 18, 1886. Muldoon served as chancellor of the archdiocese and secretary from 1888 to 1895 for Archbishop Patrick A. Feehan. He spent the next 13 years as pastor of St. Charles Borromeo Parish in Chicago.

=== Auxiliary Bishop of Chicago ===
On 25 July 1901, Pope Leo XIII appointed Muldoon as titular bishop of Tamassus and auxiliary bishop of Chicago. He was consecrated on July 25, 1901, by Cardinal Sebastiano Martinelli at Holy Name Cathedral in Chicago. After his ordination, Muldoon was assigned as an assistant pastor at St. Pius Parish in Chicago. After noticing Muldoon's abilities, Archbishop Patrick Feehan appointed him as his secretary. His appointment raised jealously among many local priests and German priests resentful of Irish clergy. Some of these discontented priests engaged in character defamation against Muldoon - one of them was ultimately excommunicated by Feehan for these actions. Muldoon was appointed as vicar-general of the archdiocese.

As auxiliary bishop, Muldoon became very interested in the welfare of working people. He would visit the Union Stock Yards, the meat packing district in Chicago. and speak with workers there. He became a strong proponent of labor unions.

When Feehan died on July 12, 1902, Muldoon was named as archdiocesan administrator. While there was some support for naming Muldoon as the new archbishop, that initiative was abandoned in the face of his previous opposition in Chicago. When Bishop James Quigley was installed, he retained Muldoon as his vicar-general.

=== Bishop of Rockford ===
In 1908, Pope Pius X appointed Muldoon as the first bishop of the new Diocese of Rockford. He was installed on December 15, 1908. Muldoon later told a friend that he was worried his enemies in the archdiocese might assault him due to his appointment.

In December 1916, the Vatican told Muldoon that the pope wanted to appoint him as bishop of the Diocese of Monterey-Los Angeles in California. Muldoon preferred to stay in Rockford, but was ready to accept the appointment. He was appointed bishop of Monterey-Los Angeles in 1917. When the papal bull arrived in Rockford, Muldoon had it placed unopened on the mantle of his fireplace. Meanwhile, the clergy and laity of Rockford petitioned the Vatican to cancel the appointment. On May 15th, the Vatican allowed Muldoon to remain as bishop of Rockford.

With the 1917 entry of the United States into World War I, Muldoon became active in ministering to soldiers and recruits at Camp Grant, the US Army facility in Rockford. He was later appointed as chair of the National Catholic War Council. He worked for the establishment of recreational facilities for soldiers in bases throughout the country. He also assisted and coordinated with Protestant and secular agencies that were helping soldiers. The organization was considered a great success.

In 1919, after the end of the war, Muldoon persuaded Cardinal James Gibbons to propose to the Vatican the creation of National Catholic Welfare Council (NCWC), a peacetime organization that was comparable to the National Catholic War Council. With Vatican approval, the NCWC was created in 1919 with Muldoon as episcopal chair of its Social Action Department. In his vision for the NCWC, he supported a paper on social reconstruction written by Father John Ryan. The paper, which begun with the sentence "The only safeguard of peace is social justice and a contented people" contained series of proposed social reforms that were quite advanced for the time. These reforms included child labor laws and public housing for the poor.

However, some American bishops felt that the NCWC was infringing on their control of their dioceses. They complained about it to Pope Pius XI in March 1922, who then revoked the NCWC approbation. Muldoon and Bishop Joseph Schrembs were among the NCWC's most vigorous defenders. After the American hierarchy sent a delegation headed by Shrembs to Rome, the Vatican agreed to restore the approbation providing, among other things, that the organization be renamed the National Catholic Welfare Conference.

=== Death ===
Peter Muldoon died in Rockford on October 8, 1927, after a long illness.
