= Naraggara =

Naraggara was an ancient city in Africa Proconsularis located 33 kilometer northwest of modern-day El Kef, Tunisia. It is considered to be the modern-day town of Sakiet Sidi Youssef, also located in Tunisia. The name Naraggara, a Libyan inscription, suggests a pre-Roman origin for the city, along with the name being bilingual in Latin and Neo-Punic.

== Battle of Zama ==
Though not much is known about the ancient city itself, it receives recognition from Roman historian Livy as the site of the Second Punic War’s final battle, called Battle of Zama. The Romans, led by Scipio Africanus the Elder, defeated Hannibal’s Carthaginians and put an end to the 17-year war.

The two armies found their way to Naraggara after Scipio devised a strategy to attack Carthage while Hannibal and his army were located in Italy. This was in an attempt to prevent Hannibal from defeating further Roman armies and instead be recalled to Carthage. After landing in Africa, the Roman army defeated the Carthaginian army at the Battle of the Great Plains in 203 BC, which pressured the Carthaginians into offering peace. After the peace treaty was signed, the Carthaginian senate recalled Hannibal from Italy. However shortly thereafter, the agreement was breached by Carthage for attacking a Roman fleet in the Gulf of Tunis. This led to the war being resumed, with both Hannibal and Scipio deploying troops in Africa and eventually marching toward the battle site near Naraggara, where the Second Punic War would be won by the Romans.

Some note a discrepancy of where the battle was actually fought. While Livy recounted Naraggara as the historical battle site, Polybius claims it occurred at Margaron, another ancient city nearby, though the exact location is unknown. This may be supported by the fact the features described by Livy and Polybius, in regards to the site of the Battle of Zama, are nowhere to be found near modern Naraggara.

After the war’s conclusion and ensuing treaty, Carthage was dealt harsh punishments, one of which was requiring permission from Rome to wage war. This created an issue when settling border disputes with neighboring kingdom, and Roman ally, Numidia. After repaying its debt to Rome fifty years after the Second Punic War, Carthage repelled against Numidian invaders and ultimately suffered a military defeat. This attack angered Rome because they did not give such consent to Carthage, and thus declared war. This began the Third Punic War which lasted just four years and ended with Carthage being completely destroyed and all its people enslaved.

With Carthage’s defeat, its lands and territories, including the area encompassing Naraggara, were claimed by Rome and formed as Africa Proconsularis. Naraggara arguably remained under Roman rule until the 5th century, when Vandals conquered the area and formed their own kingdom.

== Today ==
Today, the modern town of Sakiet Sidi Youssef replaces Naraggara. It is part of the Kef Governorate in Tunisia, and has a population of 6,335 as of 2014.

== Bishopric ==
Naraggara was an episcopal see and the names of some who were its diocesan bishops at certain dates are known:

- Faustinus, a Donatist (411)
- Maximinus (484)
- Victorinus (525)
- Bennatus (646)

It is included in the Catholic Church's list of titular sees.

== See also ==
- Ralph Leo Hayes
- The Battle of Zama
- Ancient Carthage
