= Orthodox cemetery in Białystok (Jaroszówka) =

Cemetery in Białystok, Poland

- Cmentarz prawosławny w Białymstoku (Jaroszówka)
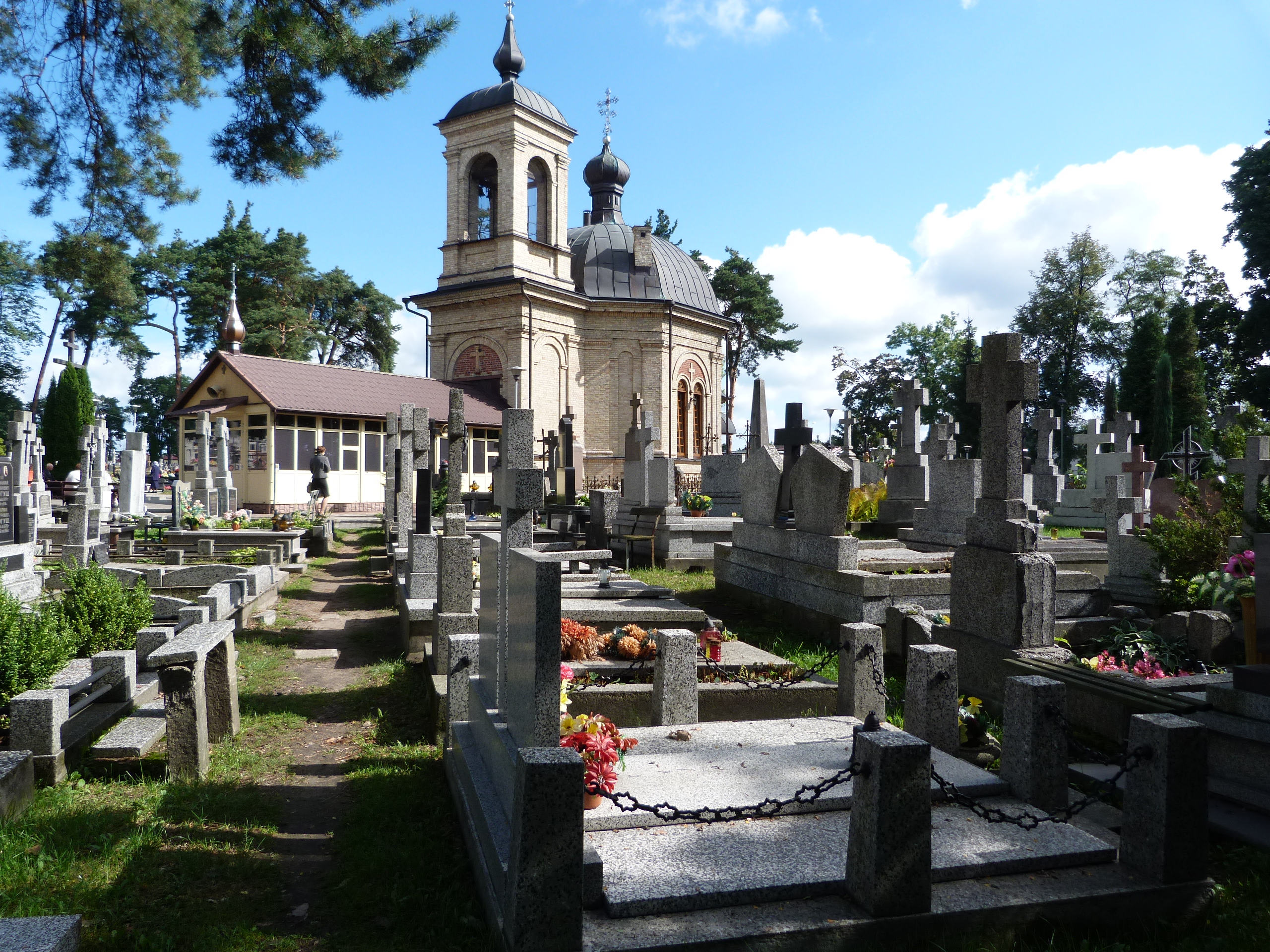
- Interactive map of Orthodox cemetery in Białystok (Jaroszówka)

Details
- Established: 1887
- Location: 1 Wysockiego street, Jaroszówka District, Białystok
- Country: Poland
- Coordinates: 53°09′01″N 23°11′03″E
- Type: Orthodox cemetery
- Owned by: Polish Orthodox Church
- Size: 6.7 hectares (17 acres)

Orthodox cemetery in Bialystok in Jaroszówka (Polish: Cmentarz prawosławny w Białymstoku (Jaroszówka)) is an orthodox cemetery located at 1 Wysockiego street in Jaroszówka District.

== History ==
After the cemetery at the Orthodox Church of St. Mary Magdalene in the center of Białystok was closed in 1887, a new cemetery was designated on the then outskirts of the city, in the Wygoda district (later on following administrative reform it became part of Jaroszówka). During World War I, the necropolis was expanded to its current boundaries and served as a military cemetery. In the years 1982–1984, a register of historic tombstones was established. The necropolis, together with the cemetery church, is listed in the register of monuments of the Podlaskie Voivodeship under the number A-84.

On May 31, 1892, the cornerstone for the construction of the cemetery church was laid on the cemetery grounds. It was consecrated under the name of All Saints on May 19, 1894, as a branch church of the parish of St. Nicholas. In 1915, a small cemetery chapel was built not far from the cemetery church.

The area behind the Orthodox cemetery there were remains of trenches and gun positions there. In the spring and summer of 1946, bodies were brought in a truck covered with straw, into which the victims' blood had soaked. The trenches were filled with bodies thrown directly from the truck, and then covered with bloody straw from the trucks and layers of earth. According to reports from Freedom and Independence Association intelligence, at least several dozen bodies were buried there of members of the anti-communist underground killed in combat with operational groups. Currently, there is a strip of wasteland behind the cemetery, partly occupied by gardens by single-family houses in the housing estate on Gedymina Street. According to local residents, while digging foundations for fencing in some gardens in the 1960s, there were cases of bones being unearthed and then buried in the cemetery.

On June 16, 1982, by the decree of the then bishop of Białystok and Gdańsk, Sawa Hrycuniak, an independent parish was established at the cemetery church. Currently, it is the smallest Orthodox parish in Białystok.

There is a monument commemorating the Armenian Genocide in the cemetery. The monument has inscriptions in Armenian and Polish. The inscription in Polish reads: In memory of 1,500,000 Armenians murdered on April 24, 1915 by the Turks.

There is a tombstone of Konstanty Prokopowicz, parish priest of the Orthodox parish in Suraż, hanged on a tree near his rectory on the night of May 22–23, 1863 by participants of the January Uprising. The tombstone was originally located in the Orthodox cemetery at the church in Zawyki, however, after the necropolis and temple were taken over by Catholics in the interwar years, a decision was made to move it to the Orthodox cemetery in Białystok, where it remains to this day. In the same section, a cross was placed, which crowned the Transfiguration of Our Lord Church in Suraż, which was demolished in 1929.

In 2017, an inventory of five quarters of the necropolis was made and a computer register of graves was created, thanks to which it is possible to use the search engine for deceased people buried in the cemetery.

In October 2019, at the initiative of the then parish priest, Piotr Pietkiewicz, controversial notes were placed on many tombstones informing about the liquidation of graves in the event of failure to pay the appropriate cemetery fee by the administrators of the cemetery space. Such notes were also placed on tombstones from the 19th and early 20th centuries, which resulted in the threat of destruction of the few preserved historic tombstones. The parish priest's action was met with disapproval from the faithful and the provincial conservator of monuments and was widely reported in the local media.
