= John Joseph Boylan (bishop) =

American prelate

His Excellency, The Most Reverend John Joseph Boylan
- Bishop of Rockford
- See: Diocese of Rockford
- In office: February 17, 1943; July 19, 1953
- Predecessor: Edward Francis Hoban
- Successor: Raymond Peter Hillinger

Orders
- Ordination: July 28, 1915 by Thomas Francis Doran
- Consecration: February 17, 1943 by Gerald Bergan

Personal details
- Born: October 7, 1889 New York City
- Died: July 19, 1953 (aged 63) Narragansett, Rhode Island, US
- Denomination: Roman Catholic
- Education: Mount St. Mary's College; St. Bernard's Seminary; Catholic University of America; Pontifical Gregorian University

John Joseph Boylan (October 7, 1889 – July 19, 1953) was an American prelate of the Roman Catholic Church. He served as bishop of the Diocese of Rockford in Illinois from 1943 until his death in 1953.

== Biography ==
=== Early life ===
John Boylan was born on October 7, 1889, in New York City to Edward Lawrence and Bridget Anne (née Morrissey) Boylan. When he was a young child, the family moved to Providence, Rhode Island, where he attended Catholic primary schools. In 1904, Boylan entered La Salle Academy in Providence.

After graduating from La Salle in 1908, Boylan entered Mount St. Mary's College in Emmitsburg, Maryland, to study classics. Having decided to become a priest, Boylan enrolled in 1910 in St. Bernard's Seminary in Rochester, New York, finishing his studies in 1915.

=== Priesthood ===
Boylan was ordained a priest in Providence by Auxiliary Bishop Thomas Francis Doran for the Diocese of Des Moines on July 28, 1915. After his ordination, Boylan moved to Council Bluffs, Iowa, to serve as a curate at St. Francis Parish for a brief time. He was soon sent to Washington, D.C., to study at the Catholic University of America, where he earned a Bachelor of Sacred Theology degree and Licentiate of Canon Law in 1917.

In 1918, Boylan joined the faculty of Dowling College, a Catholic secondary school in West Des Moines, Iowa. He was named president of the college in 1922, serving in that role until 1943. In 1923, Boylan earned a Ph.D. from the Pontifical Gregorian University in Rome. In 1924, he was also appointed director of Catholic Charities of the diocese and superintendent of its Catholic schools. Boylan left the Catholic Charities and superintendent positions in 1934 to become vicar general of the diocese. The Vatican named him a domestic prelate in October 1933 and a protonotary apostolic in November 1940.

=== Bishop of Rockford ===
On November 21, 1942, Boylan was appointed bishop of the Diocese of Rockford by Pope Pius XII. He received his episcopal consecration on February 17, 1943, at St. Ambrose Cathedral in Des Moines by Bishop Gerald Bergan, with Bishops Edmond Heelan and Henry Rohlman serving as co-consecrators. During his tenure as bishop, Boylan was able to reduce the diocese's debt while adding new parishes and schools to meet population growth. In December 1952, Boylan underwent a major surgery, but he was able to resume his duties by February 1953.

While on a visit to family, John Boylan died in Narragansett, Rhode Island, on July 19, 1953, at age 63.

Catholic Church titles
Preceded by Edward Francis Hoban	Bishop of Rockford; 1943—1953	Succeeded by Raymond Peter Hillinger
