= Edward Francis Hoban =

American prelate

His Excellency, The Most Reverend Edward Francis Hoban D.D., S.T.D.
- Archbishop (personal title); Bishop of Cleveland; Titular Bishop of Colonia in Armenia
- Church: Roman Catholic Church
- See: Diocese of Cleveland
- Appointed: November 14, 1942
- In office: November 2, 1945 – September 22, 1966
- Predecessor: Joseph Schrembs
- Successor: Clarence George Issenmann
- Previous posts: Auxiliary Bishop of Chicago (1921 to 1928); Bishop of Rockford (1928 to 1942)

Orders
- Ordination: July 11, 1903 by James Edward Quigley
- Consecration: December 21, 1921 by George Mundelein

Personal details
- Born: June 27, 1878 Chicago, Illinois, USA
- Died: September 22, 1966 (aged 88) Cleveland, Ohio, USA
- Buried: Cathedral Resurrection Chapel
- Education: St. Igantius College; St. Mary's Seminary; Pontifical Gregorian University
- Motto: Veni lumen cordium (Come, light of our hearts)

Ordination history of Edward Francis Hoban
History
Episcopal consecration
- Consecrated by: George Mundelein (Chicago)
Episcopal succession
Bishops consecrated by Edward Francis Hoban as principal consecrator
- John Raphael Hagan: May 28, 1946
- Floyd Lawrence Begin: May 1, 1947

Edward Francis Hoban (June 27, 1878 – September 22, 1966) was an American prelate of the Roman Catholic Church. He served as bishop of the Diocese of Cleveland in Ohio from 1945 to 1966. He previously served as bishop of the Diocese of Rockford in Illinois from 1928 to 1942 and as an auxiliary bishop of the Archdiocese of Chicago in Illinois from 1921 to 1928.

In 1952, Pope Pius XII gave Hoban the personal title of archbishop.

== Biography ==
=== Early life ===
Edward Hoban was born on June 27, 1878, in Chicago, Illinois, to William and Bridget (née O'Malley) Hoban, both Irish immigrants. William Hoban was a shoemaker. Edward Hoban attended St. Columbkille parochial school and then St. Ignatius High School in Chicago. Hoban then entered St. Ignatius College in Chicago, earning a Bachelor of Arts degree (1899) and a Master of Arts degree (1900). He then studied at St. Mary's Seminary in Baltimore, Maryland.

=== Priesthood ===
Hoban was ordained to the priesthood at Holy Name Cathedral in Chicago for the Archdiocese of Chicago by Archbishop James Quigley on July 11, 1903. After his ordination, Hoban was assigned briefly as curate at St. Agnes Parish in Chicago. He then traveled to Rome to attended Pontifical Gregorian University, earning a Doctor of Sacred Theology degree in 1906.

Returning to Chicago in 1906, Hoban was named as the assistant chancellor to Monsignor Edmund Dunne, the chancellor of the archdiocese. When Dunne was named bishop of the Diocese of Peoria in 1910, Hoban replaced him as chancellor. He also served as professor and treasurer of Archbishop Quigley Preparatory Seminary in Chicago. As chancellor, Hoban supervised the establishment of Associated Catholic Charities of Chicago. In November 1916, Pope Benedict XV named him a papal chamberlain.

=== Auxiliary Bishop of Chicago ===
On November 21, 1921, Hoban was appointed as an auxiliary bishop of Chicago and titular bishop of Colonia in Armenia by Pope Benedict XV. He received his episcopal consecration at Holy Name Cathedral on December 21, 1921, from Cardinal George Mundelein, with Bishops Alexander McGavick and Thomas Molloy serving as co-consecrators.

As auxiliary bishop he served in several administrative posts, including as vicar general in 1924. In 1926 Hoban served as the president of the International Eucharistic Congress. This was the first Congress held outside of Europe, attracting over one million attendees. Its success was attributed, in large part, to Hoban's administrative skill and his ability to marshal and organize the efforts of clergy, religious and laity.

=== Bishop of Rockford ===
Hoban was named the second bishop of Rockford by Pope Pius XI on February 21, 1928; he was installed on May 15, 1928. In 1931, Hoban received the Commander of the Order of the Crown award from the Fascist Government of Italy.

During his tenure, Hoban opened many elementary and high schools in the diocese, modernized charitable institutions, and established a diocesan newspaper. Hoban was named as an assistant at the pontifical throne on November 25, 1937.

=== Coadjutor Bishop and Bishop of Cleveland ===
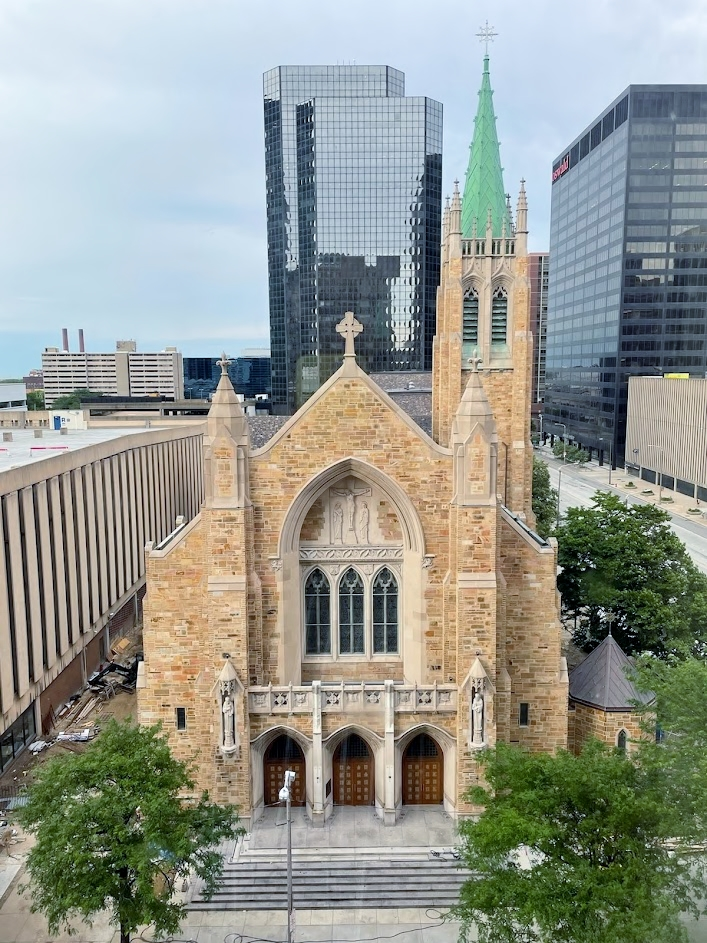
St. John's Cathedral, Cleveland, Ohio (2022)

On November 14, 1942, Hoban was appointed coadjutor bishop of Cleveland and titular bishop of Lystra by Pope Pius XII. After the death of Bishop Joseph Schrembs on November 2, 1945, Hoban automatically succeeded him as the sixth bishop of Cleveland.

As bishop, Hoban encouraged refugees displaced by World War II to settle in Cleveland. He also established national and ethnic parishes, but insisted that their parochial schools only teach in English. He helped rebuild and remodel St. John's Cathedral, and enlarged St. John's College, both in Cleveland. Hoban centralized Parmadale Family Services, constructed additional nursing homes, and opened Holy Family Cancer Home in Parma, Ohio, a hospice for cancer patients. Hoban opened a minor seminary and expanded the Newman Apostolate for Catholic students attending public universities and colleges.

Hoban received the personal title of archbishop on July 23, 1951. He attended all four sessions of the Second Vatican Council in Rome between 1962 and 1965. During Hoban's 21-year-long tenure, the number of Catholics in the diocese increased from 546,000 to 870,000, even though the diocese lost six counties with the erection of the Diocese of Youngstown in 1943. Hoban also established 61 parishes, 47 elementary schools, and a dozen high schools.

=== Death ===
Edward Hoban died in Cleveland on September 22, 1966, at age 88. He is buried in the crypt of St. John's Cathedral.

Catholic Church titles
Preceded by Peter Muldoon	Bishop of Rockford; 1928—1942	Succeeded by John Joseph Boylan
Preceded by Joseph Schrembs	Bishop of Cleveland; 1945—1966	Succeeded by Clarence George Issenmann
