= Loras Thomas Lane =

American prelate (1910–1968)

His Excellency, The Most Reverend Loras Thomas Lane JCD
- Bishop of Rockford; Titular Bishop of Bencenna
- Church: Roman Catholic Church
- See: Diocese of Rockford
- In office: November 20, 1956 – July 22, 1968
- Predecessor: Raymond Peter Hillinger
- Successor: Arthur Joseph O'Neill
- Previous posts: Auxiliary Bishop of Dubuque; 1951 to 1956

Orders
- Ordination: March 19, 1937 by Francesco Marchetti Selvaggiani
- Consecration: August 20, 1951 by Leo Binz

Personal details
- Born: October 19, 1910 Cascade, Iowa, USA
- Died: July 22, 1968 (aged 57) Chicago, Illinois, USA
- Education: University of Notre Dame; Loras College; Pontifical Gregorian University; Catholic University of America
- Motto: Via veritas (The way of truth)

Loras Thomas Lane (October 19, 1910 – July 22, 1968), was an American prelate of the Roman Catholic Church. He served as an auxiliary bishop of the Archdiocese of Dubuque in Iowa from 1951 to 1956 and as bishop of the Diocese of Rockford in Illinois from 1956 until his death in 1968.

== Biography ==
=== Early life and ministry ===
Lane was born on October 19, 1910, in Cascade, Iowa, to Thomas and Josephine (née Barrett) Lane. His nephew was Michael A. Hess, victim of a notorious adoption scandal detailed in the book The Lost Child of Philomena Lee.

Lane attended St. Martin's grade and high schools in Cascade. After graduating from the University of Notre Dame in Indiana in 1932, he earned a Bachelor of Arts degree from Loras College in Dubuque, Iowa in 1933. He then attended the Pontifical Gregorian University in Rome, earning a Licentiate of Sacred Theology in 1937.

=== Priesthood ===
Lane was ordained to the priesthood for the Archdiocese of Dubuque by Cardinal Francesco Selvaggiani on March 19, 1937, in Rome.

Upon his return to Iowa in 1937, Lane served as a curate at Nativity Parish in Dubuque until 1940. He studied at the University of Iowa before earning a Doctorate of Canon Law degree from The Catholic University of America in Washington, D.C. Lane became an instructor in Spanish and economics, and was appointed dean of men at Loras College. Lane became the secretary to Archbishop Henry Rohlman and vice-chancellor and then chancellor of the Archdiocese of Dubuque. In 1949, Pope Pius XII named Lane a domestic prelate.

=== Auxiliary Bishop of Dubuque ===
On May 29, 1951, Lane was appointed titular bishop of Bencenna and auxiliary bishop of Dubuque by Pius XII. Lane received his episcopal consecration on August 20, 1951, from Archbishop Leo Binz in St. Raphael Cathedral in Dubuque. Bishops Joseph Willging and Edward Fitzgerald were the co-consecrators. While he was auxiliary bishop, Lane also served as president of Loras College.

=== Bishop of Rockford ===
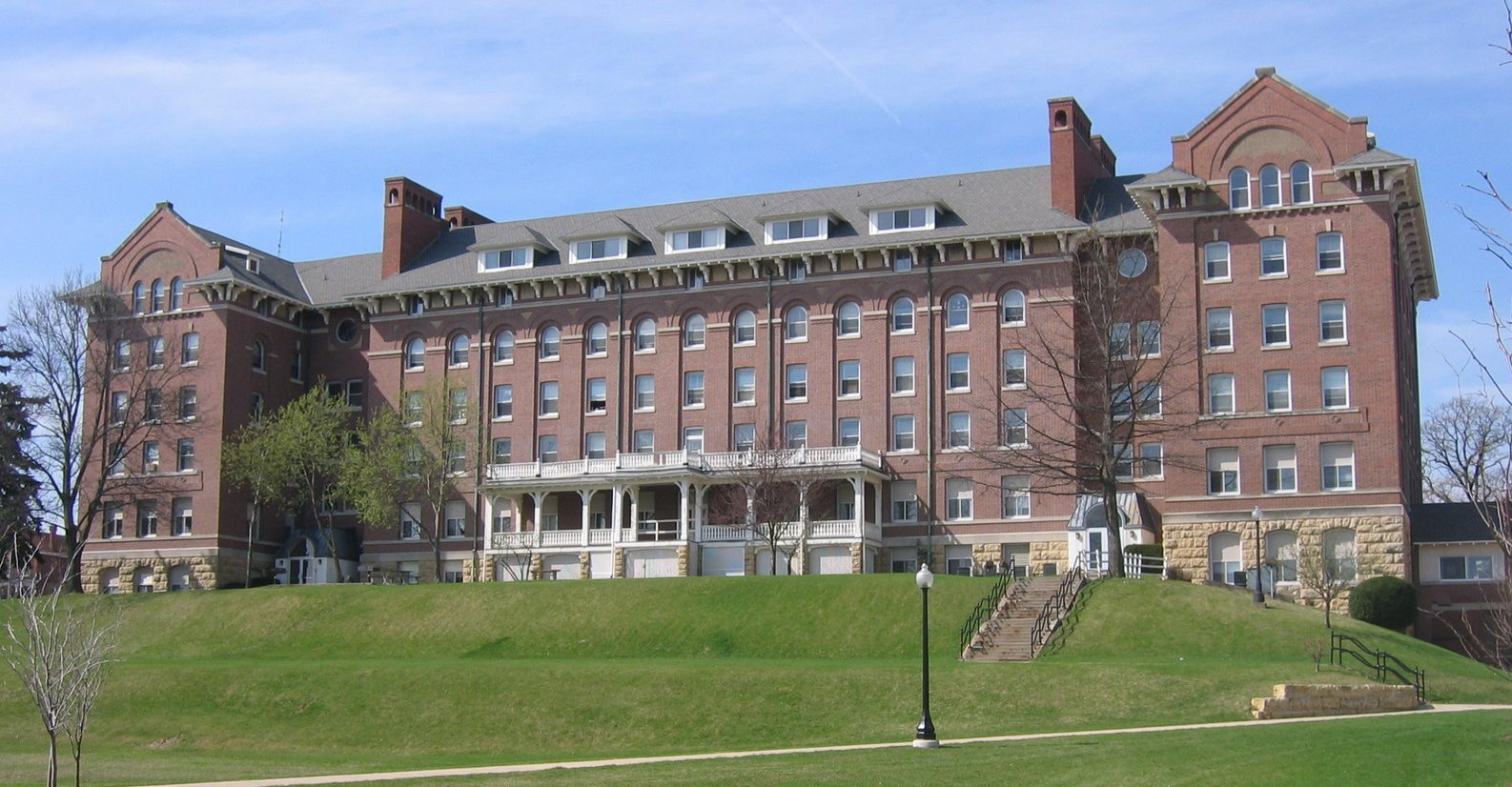
Loras College, Dubuque, Iowa (2005)

Lane was named bishop of Rockford on October 11, 1956, by Pius XII. He was installed on November 20, 1956, at St. James Pro-Cathedral by Cardinal Samuel Stritch. Lane attended all four sessions of the Second Vatican Council in Rome between 1962 and 1965. According to author Martin Sixsmith, Lane had "earn[ed] a reputation among his clerical contemporaries for being hugely ambitious and more than a little cocky". Kidney disease began to affect Lane's health a year before his death.

=== Death ===
Loras Lane died at Michael Reese Hospital in Chicago on July 22, 1968, at age 57. His funeral was celebrated by Cardinal John Cody at St. James Pro-Cathedral with Archbishop Binz as the homilist. Lane was buried in Calvary Cemetery in Winnebago, Illinois.

Catholic Church titles
Preceded by Raymond Peter Hillinger	Bishop of Rockford; 1956–1968	Succeeded by Arthur Joseph O'Neill
