= Mark Andrew Bartosic =

American priest of the Catholic Church

His Excellency, The Most Reverend Mark Andrew Bartosic
- Auxiliary Bishop of Chicago; Titular Bishop of Naratcata
- See: Archdiocese of Chicago
- Appointed: July 3, 2018
- Installed: September 17, 2018

Orders
- Ordination: May 21, 1994 by Joseph Bernardin
- Consecration: September 17, 2018 by Blase J. Cupich, Francis J. Kane, and George J. Rassas

Personal details
- Born: June 21, 1961 (age 64) Neenah, Wisconsin, US
- Education: Ashland University; University of St. Mary of the Lake; Niles College Seminary
- Motto: Ego ero ei in patrem (I will be a father to him)

Styles of Mark Andrew Bartosic
- Reference style: His Excellency; The Most Reverend
- Spoken style: Your Excellency
- Religious style: Bishop

Mark Andrew Bartosic (born June 21, 1961) is an American prelate of the Catholic Church who has been serving as an auxiliary bishop for the Archdiocese of Chicago in Illinois since 2018.

== Biography ==
=== Early life ===
Mark Bartosic was born in Neenah, Wisconsin on June 21, 1961. He attended St. Edward School in Ashland, Ohio, then completed his secondary education in the Ashland City School District. Bartosic attended Ashland University, obtaining a Bachelor of Arts degree in theater.

After graduating from college in 1983, Bartosic moved to Chicago, Illinois, to get find acting jobs. According to Bartosic, he started attending mass at a Chicago church and was impressed with how much more diverse it was than his parish in Ashland. He worked on the crew of the 1986 film Ferris Bueller’s Day Off as a stand-in for actor Alan Ruck. After re-evaluating his chances of becoming a successful actor, Bartosic decided he would rather be a successful priest. In 1989, Bartosic entered the University of St. Mary of the Lake in Mundelein, Illinois and later Niles College Seminary at Loyola University Chicago. After graduation, Bartosic spent a year in Mexico working in an orphanage.

=== Priesthood ===
On May 21, 1994, Bartosic was ordained to the priesthood for the Archdiocese of Chicago at Holy Name Cathedral in Chicago by Cardinal Joseph Bernardin.

After his ordination, the archdiocese assigned Bartosic as associate pastor for St. Agnes of Bohemia Parish in Chicago. In 2001, he was named pastor of St. Frances of Rome Parish in Cicero, Illinois, serving there for 15 years. Bartosic assumed the additional pastoral duties at Our Lady of Charity Parish in Cicero in 2009. In 2016, Cardinal Blase Cupich appointed Bartosic as director of the Kolbe House Jail Ministry in Chicago as well as the pastor of Assumption Blessed Virgin Mary Parish in Chicago.

=== Auxiliary Bishop of Chicago ===
Pope Francis appointed Bartosic as auxiliary bishop of Chicago and titular bishop of Naratcata on July 3, 2018. He was consecrated at Holy Name Cathedral on September 17, 2018, by Cupich, with Auxiliary Bishops Francis J. Kane, and George J. Rassas serving as co-consecrators.

On September 22, 2018, Cupich suspended Reverend Paul Kalchik, pastor of Resurrection Parish in Chicago, after receiving complaints from parishioners. Ten days earlier, Kalchik had held an exorcism at the church, followed by the burning of a rainbow flag on the church grounds. Bartosic met with Kalchik at the parish and told him he had to leave his residence immediately or be arrested for trespassing. Since Kalchik was just getting ready to officiate a wedding, Bartosic took his place.

Bartosic is currently going around church parishes in the Chicago area holding masses and special occasions.

== See also ==
- Catholic Church hierarchy
- Catholic Church in the United States
- Historical list of the Catholic bishops of the United States
- List of Catholic bishops of the United States
- Lists of patriarchs, archbishops, and bishops

== Episcopal succession ==
Catholic Church titles
Preceded by -	Auxiliary Bishop of Chicago; 2018-Present	Succeeded by -
