= Lawrence J. Sullivan =

American bishop-elect

His Excellency, The Most Reverend Lawrence John Sullivan
- Auxiliary Bishop of Chicago; Titular Bishop of Lamfua
- Archdiocese: Chicago
- Appointed: December 20, 2024
- Installed: February 26, 2025
- Other post: Titular Bishop of Lamfua

Orders
- Ordination: May 23, 1992 by Joseph Bernardin
- Consecration: February 26, 2025 by Blase J. Cupich, Robert Gerald Casey, and Jeffrey S. Grob

Personal details
- Born: January 22, 1966 (age 60) Chicago, Illinois, US
- Motto: Walk humbly with God

Styles of Lawrence John Sullivan
- Reference style: His Excellency; The Most Reverend
- Spoken style: Your Excellency
- Religious style: Bishop

Lawrence John Sullivan (born January 22, 1966) is an American prelate of the Roman Catholic Church who has been serving as an auxiliary bishop for the Archdiocese of Chicago in Illinois since 2025.

== Early life ==
Lawrence Sullivan was born on January 22, 1966, in Chicago, Illinois. He attended Niles College Seminary, followed by Mundelein Seminary. Sullivan was ordained to the priesthood for the Archdiocese of Chicago by Cardinal Joseph Bernardin at Holy Name Cathedral in Chicago on May 23, 1992.

== Episcopacy ==
Pope Francis appointed Sullivan as titular bishop Lamfua and as an auxiliary bishop of Chicago, on December 20, 2024. Sullivan was consecrated as a bishop on February 26, 2025, at Holy Name Cathedral by Cardinal Blase Cupich.

== See also ==
- Catholic Church hierarchy
- Catholic Church in the United States
- Historical list of the Catholic bishops of the United States
- List of Catholic bishops of the United States
- Lists of patriarchs, archbishops, and bishops

== Episcopal succession ==
Catholic Church titles
Preceded by -	Auxiliary Bishop of Chicago; 2025-Present	Succeeded by -
