= Ronald Hicks =

American Catholic prelate (born 1967)

His Excellency, The Most Reverend Ronald Hicks
- Archbishop of New York
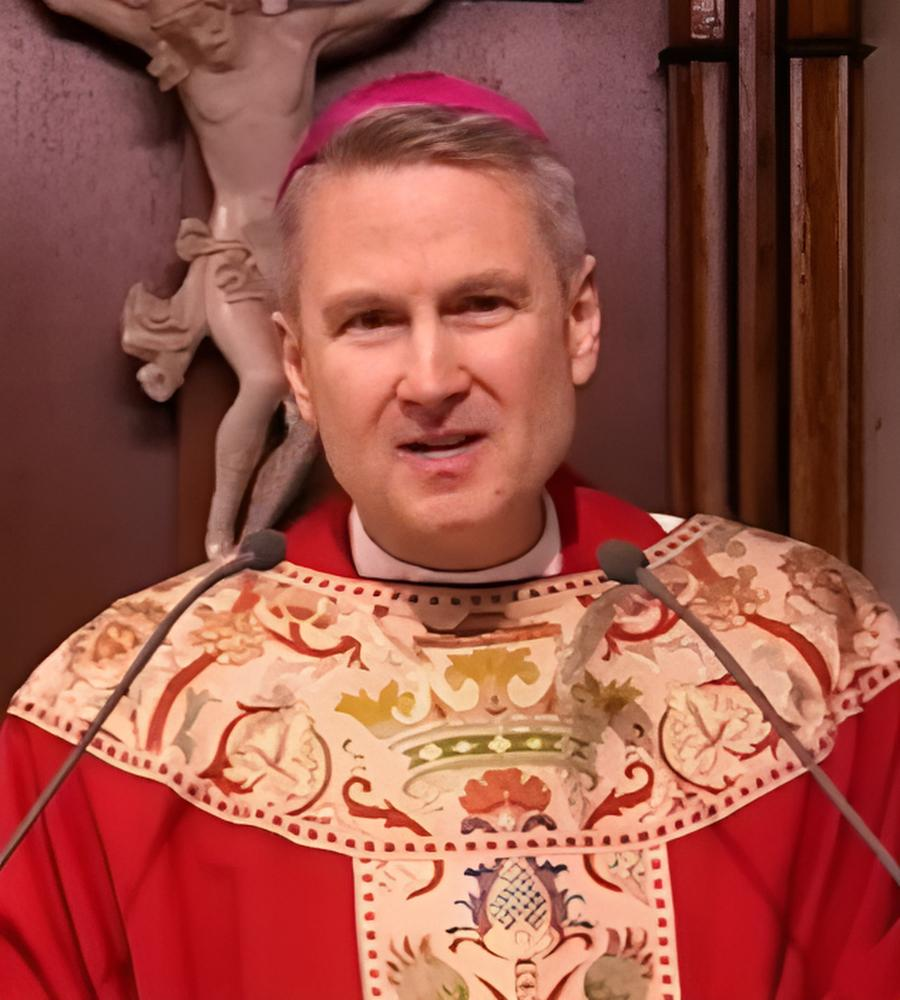
- Hicks in 2026, while preaching at his Mass of Installation as Archbishop at Saint Patrick's Cathedral
- Church: Catholic Church
- Archdiocese: New York
- Appointed: December 18, 2025
- Installed: February 6, 2026
- Predecessor: Timothy Dolan
- Previous posts: Auxiliary Bishop of Chicago & Titular Bishop of Munatiana (2018‍–‍2020); Bishop of Joliet in Illinois (2020‍–‍2026)

Orders
- Ordination: May 21, 1994 by Joseph Bernardin
- Consecration: September 17, 2018 by Blase Cupich

Personal details
- Born: Ronald Aldon Hicks; August 4, 1967 (age 59) Harvey, Illinois, US
- Education: Niles College Seminary (BA); University of Saint Mary of the Lake (MDiv, DMin)
- Motto: Paz y bien (Spanish for 'Peace and good')
- Styles
- Reference style: His Excellency; The Most Reverend
- Spoken style: Your Excellency
- Religious style: Archbishop

Ronald Aldon Hicks (born August 4, 1967) is an American Catholic prelate who serves as Archbishop of New York. He previously served as an auxiliary bishop of the Archdiocese of Chicago from 2018 to 2020 and as Bishop of Joliet in Illinois from 2020 to 2026.

== Early life and education ==
Ronald Aldon Hicks was born on August 4, 1967, in Harvey, Illinois. He is the son of Ronald and Roselee (née Baer) Hicks, who both worked as teachers. His father was raised Catholic but his mother was a Lutheran until approximately 1996. Hicks has a younger brother, Rick. His family is of Irish, German, and Polish descent.

Hicks grew up in South Holland, where he received his early education at the grade school of St. Jude the Apostle Parish. In 1985, he graduated from Quigley Preparatory Seminary South in Chicago, a high school for boys interested in the priesthood. He then attended Niles College Seminary of Loyola University Chicago, earning a Bachelor of Arts in philosophy in 1989. To learn Spanish, he spent a year volunteering for Nuestros Pequeños Hermanos at an orphanage in Mexico. Upon his return to Illinois, Hicks enrolled at the University of Saint Mary of the Lake and earned a Master of Divinity in 1994.

== Career ==
=== Priesthood ===
On May 21, 1994, Hicks was ordained a priest for the Archdiocese of Chicago by Cardinal Joseph Bernardin. He then served as an associate pastor at Our Lady of Mercy Parish in Chicago from (1994–1996) and at St. Elizabeth Seton Parish in Orland Hills from (1996–1999). From 1999 to 2005, he was dean of formation at Niles College Seminary (then St. Joseph College Seminary). During this time, he received a Doctor of Ministry from the University of St. Mary of the Lake in 2003.

In 2005, Hicks moved to El Salvador to serve as a director for Nuestros Pequeños Hermanos, a system of orphanages in Latin America. After five years in El Salvador, Hicks returned to Illinois. Cardinal Francis George then appointed Hicks in 2010 as dean of formation at Mundelein Seminary. On January 1, 2015, Archbishop Blase J. Cupich selected Hicks as vicar general for the archdiocese.

=== Auxiliary Bishop of Chicago ===
Coat of Arms as auxiliary bishop of Chicago

On July 3, 2018, Pope Francis appointed Hicks titular bishop of Munatiana and auxiliary bishop of Chicago. On September 17, 2018, Hicks was consecrated by Cardinal Cupich at Holy Name Cathedral, with Bishops Francis J. Kane and George J. Rassas serving as co-consecrators.

=== Bishop of Joliet ===
Coat of Arms as Bishop of Joliet

On July 17, 2020, Francis named Hicks bishop of Joliet. He was installed in the Cathedral of St. Raymond Nonnatus in Joliet on September 29, 2020; the congregation was limited to 20% of capacity because of the COVID-19 pandemic.

When interviewed after the election of Pope Leo XIV, Hicks described similarities between himself and Leo, saying, "I recognize a lot of similarities between him and me. So we grew up literally in the same radius, in the same neighborhood together. We played in the same parks, went swimming in the same pools, liked the same pizza places to go to."

In 2025, he published a pastoral letter for the Diocese of Joliet entitled "MAKE", speaking on the importance of making disciples.

=== Archbishop of New York ===
Pope Leo XIV named Hicks archbishop of New York on December 18, 2025. He was installed on February 6, 2026. On the Solemnity of Saints Peter and Paul, June 29, 2026, he received the pallium at St. Peter's Basilica in Rome from Pope Leo, along with other metropolitan archbishops.

For the United States Conference of Catholic Bishops, Hicks is the chairman of the Committee on Clergy, Consecrated Life and Vocations. He is a board member of the Catholic Extension Society and the Mundelein Seminary Advisory Board.

== See also ==
- Catholic Church in the United States
- Hierarchy of the Catholic Church
- Historical list of the Catholic bishops of the United States
- List of Catholic bishops in the United States
- Lists of popes, patriarchs, primates, archbishops, and bishops

Catholic Church titles
Preceded by Timothy Dolan	Archbishop of New York; 2026–present	Succeeded by Incumbent
Preceded by Robert Daniel Conlon	Bishop of Joliet; 2020–2026	Succeeded by Sede Vacante
Preceded by –	Auxiliary Bishop of Chicago; 2018–2020	Succeeded by –
