= Robert Fedek =

Polish-American bishop-elect

His Excellency, The Most Reverend Robert Miroslaw Fedek
- Auxiliary Bishop of Chicago; Titular Bishop of Dardano
- Archdiocese: Chicago
- Appointed: December 20, 2024
- Installed: February 26, 2025
- Other post: Titular Bishop of Dardano

Orders
- Ordination: May 21, 2005 by Francis Eugene George
- Consecration: February 26, 2025 by Blase J. Cupich, Robert Gerald Casey, and Jeffrey S. Grob

Personal details
- Born: July 7, 1979 (age 46) Bielsko-Biała, Poland
- Education: Academy of Theology; Bishop Abramowicz Seminary; Mundelein Seminary
- Motto: Duc in altum (Put out into the deep)

Styles of Robert Miroslaw Fedek
- Reference style: His Excellency; The Most Reverend
- Spoken style: Your Excellency
- Religious style: Bishop

Robert Miroslaw Fedek (born July 7, 1979) is a Polish-born priest of the Roman Catholic Church who has been serving as an auxiliary bishop for the Archdiocese of Chicago in Illinois since 2025.

== Early life ==
Fedek was born on July 7, 1979, in Bielsko-Biała, Poland. He attended the Academy of Theology in Kraków before moving to the United States and attending first Bishop Abramowicz Seminary in Chicago and then Mundelein Seminary in Mundelein, Illinois.

== Priesthood ==
On May 21, 2005, Fedek was ordained to the priesthood for the Archdiocese of Chicago at Holy Name Cathedral in Chicago by Cardinal Francis Eugene George.After his ordination, the archdiocese assigned Fedek as an associate pastor at Saint Mary of the Annunciation Parish in Mundelein. He was named assistant vocation director for Vicariate I in 2007. Fedek was transferred in 2010 to serve as pastor of Our Lady of Victory Parish in Chicago.

Fedek was named as coordinator of the Polish Ministry Council in 2015 and in 2017 was reassigned as pastor of Immaculate Conception Parish in Chicago. In 2020, Cardinal Blase Cupich named Fedek as his administrative secretary.

== Auxiliary Bishop of Chicago ==
Pope Francis appointed Fedek as an auxiliary bishop of Chicago and titular bishop of Dardanus on December 20, 2024. Fedek was consecrated as a bishop on February 26, 2025 at Holy Name Cathedral by Cardinal Blase Cupich.

== See also ==
- Catholic Church hierarchy
- Catholic Church in the United States
- Historical list of the Catholic bishops of the United States
- List of Catholic bishops of the United States
- Lists of patriarchs, archbishops, and bishops

== Episcopal succession ==
Catholic Church titles
Preceded by -	Auxiliary Bishop of Chicago; 2025-Present	Succeeded by -
