= L. Scott Donahue =

American priest

The Reverend L. Scott Donahue
- Church: St. Robert Bellarmine
- Archdiocese: Archdiocese of Chicago

Orders
- Ordination: May 12, 1982

Personal details
- Denomination: Roman Catholic
- Occupation: President/CEO of Mercy Home for Boys & Girls

Fr. Louis Scott Donahue (/skɑt_ˈdɑnəhˌju/; commonly known as Father Scott) is an American priest who is the president and CEO of Mercy Home for Boys & Girls, a Chicago-based childcare and residential home for children within the Archdiocese of Chicago. Donahue also serves as resident priest at St. Robert Bellarmine parish.

== Life and education ==
Donahue holds bachelor's degrees in Political Science and Accounting; and a master's degree in Social Work from Loyola University. He also holds a master's degree in theology from St. Mary of the Lake Seminary and Applied Spirituality from the University of San Francisco. He was also awarded an honorary doctorate from St. Xavier University.

Donahue was ordained in May 1982 by Bishop Nevin William Hays.

== Work ==
Donahue is the president and CEO of Mercy Home for Boys & Girls. He came to Mercy Home in 1990 and since then he has established The academy at Mercy Home, an in-house education program, while also helping expand the Community Care program (formerly AfterCare program), which provides lifelong resources and encouragement to Mercy Home's former residents. He also led a US$10 million expansion of the facility that allowed it to increase the number of youths in its care by 40 percent. In 2017, Donahue revealed that the archdiocese will work with Chicago's Youth Guidance to develop parish-based programs for youth that help them overcome obstacles and succeed in life.

Donahue ministers at St. Robert Bellarmine Catholic Parish in Chicago, and is the principal celebrant of WGN-TV Channel 9’s Sunday Mass at Mercy Home.

Donahue was inducted in the Irish American Hall of Fame in April 2019 in the religion category for his 37-year ministry as a Catholic priest and his work at Mercy Home. He has authored a book entitled Years of Mercy.
