= Robert Gerald Casey =

American Catholic prelate (born 1967)

His Excellency, The Most Reverend Robert Gerald Casey
- Archbishop of Cincinnati
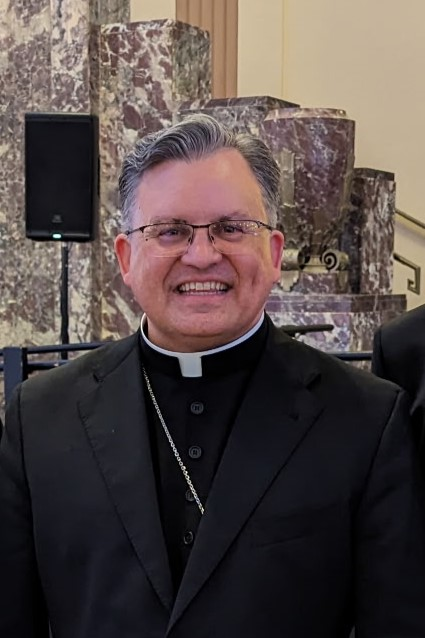
- Archbishop Casey in 2025
- Archdiocese: Cincinnati
- Appointed: February 12, 2025
- Installed: April 3, 2025
- Predecessor: Dennis Marion Schnurr
- Previous post: Auxiliary Bishop of Chicago and Titular Bishop of Thuburbo Maius (2018-2025)

Orders
- Ordination: May 21, 1994 by Joseph Bernardin
- Consecration: September 17, 2018 by Blase J. Cupich, Francis J. Kane, and George J. Rassas

Personal details
- Born: September 23, 1967 (age 58) Evergreen Park, Illinois, U.S.
- Denomination: Catholic Church
- Education: University of Saint Mary of the Lake
- Motto: Into Your hands
- Styles
- Reference style: His Excellency; The Most Reverend
- Spoken style: Your Excellency
- Religious style: Archbishop

Coat of Arms as Auxiliary Bishop of Chicago

Robert Gerald Casey (born September 23, 1967) is an American Catholic prelate who serves as the Archbishop of Cincinnati. He previously served as an auxiliary bishop for the Archdiocese of Chicago (2018-2025).

== Biography ==
=== Early life ===
Casey was born on September 23, 1967, in Evergreen Park, Illinois. He is the fourth of five children of Michael Casey, a butcher, and Margaret Casey, a nurse. When he was a child, his family moved to Alsip, Illinois. He attended Stony Creek Elementary School and Prairie Junior High School in that town. Casey then entered Marist High School in Chicago, where he started considering the priesthood.

After graduating from Marist in 1985, Casey entered Niles College Seminary of Loyola University Chicago. He graduated from Niles in 1989 with a Bachelor of Arts degree in English. Following this, he spent a year with the Congregation of the Passion in St. Louis, before returning to Chicago. He then entered the University of St. Mary of the Lake, in Mundelein, Illinois, receiving a Master of Divinity degree in 1994.

=== Priesthood ===
On May 21, 1994, Casey was ordained to the priesthood for the Archdiocese of Chicago at Holy Name Cathedral in Chicago by Cardinal Joseph Bernardin.

After his ordination in 1994, the archdiocese assigned Casey as associate pastor of St. Ita Parish in Chicago. In 1998, he was also appointed associate director of Casa Jesus, a priesthood recruiting program aimed at Hispanic men. Questions were later raised as to his level of knowledge of cultural issues regarding celibacy and the prevalence of homosexual behavior among seminarians there during his tenure. By 1999, Casey was working full-time as its director. In 2003, he undertook a 40-day pilgrimage to Santiago de Compostela in Spain.

After returning from Spain later in 2003, the archdiocese named Casey as pastor of Our Lady of Tepeyac Parish in Chicago. Casey was suspended in 2008 for four weeks while the Illinois Department of Children and Family Services investigated a sexual abuse allegation against him at that parish. The archdiocese returned him to ministry after the investigation determined the complaint was unfounded.

The archdiocese transferred Casey in 2009 to serve as pastor of St. Barbara Parish in Brookfield, Illinois. Casey left St. Barbara in 2016 to become pastor of St. Bede the Venerable Parish in Chicago.

=== Auxiliary Bishop of Chicago ===
Pope Francis appointed Casey as an auxiliary bishop of Chicago on July 3, 2018. On September 17, 2018, Casey was consecrated at Holy Name Cathedral in Chicago by Cardinal Blase Cupich. His co-consecrators were Auxiliary Bishops Francis J. Kane and George J. Rassas.

After his installation, Cupich assigned Casey as vicar for Vicariate III. In 2020, Cupich appointed him as vicar general for the archdiocese.

=== Archbishop of Cincinnati ===
Casey was named Archbishop of Cincinnati on February 12, 2025. Casey's installation occurred on April 3, 2025. In September 2025, Casey rolled back his predecessor's decision to sever ties with the Girl Scouts of the USA. In January 2026, Casey announced a two-year Archdiocesan Synod, culminating in 2027.

== See also ==
- Catholic Church hierarchy
- Catholic Church in the United States
- Historical list of the Catholic bishops of the United States
- List of Catholic bishops of the United States
- Lists of patriarchs, archbishops, and bishops

Catholic Church titles
Preceded by –	Auxiliary Bishop of Chicago; 2018–2025	Succeeded by –
Preceded by Dennis Marion Schnurr	Archbishop of Cincinnati; 2025–present	Incumbent
