= Patrick Thomas Brennan =

American missionary

Servant of God Patrick Thomas Brennan SSC
- Born: March 13, 1901; Chicago, Cook, Illinois
- Died: September 24, 1950 (aged 49); Daejeon, South Korea
- Cause of death: Martyrdom
- Parent(s): Patrick Brennan, Jane Gorman
- Relatives: Richard Brennan (brother) Jane Carmelita Brennan O'Brien (sister)

Patrick Thomas Brennan, SSC (1901–1950), was an American Catholic missionary priest who served as the Apostolic Prefect of Gwangju from 1948 to 1950. He was killed by North Korean forces in 1950. He was a member of the Missionary Society of St. Columban. His sainthood cause was opened in 2013.

== Biography ==
Born in 1901 in Chicago to Irish parents, Brennan was educated in St Rita's High School and Quigley Prep Seminary before studying at Mundelein Seminary. He was ordained a priest for the Archdiocese of Chicago in 1928, and served as a curate in Epiphany Church, St. Mary of the Lake, and St Anthony's in Joliet.

Brennan joined the Missionary Society of St. Columban (Columban Fathers) in 1936 and was assigned to Korea in 1938. Brennan was interned by Japanese forces following the attack on Pearl Harbor in 1941, and was repatriated to the United States. He served as an Army chaplain in Europe during the war, in Normandy, Ardennes and Germany, for which he was decorated with the Soldier's Medal for bravery.

In 1947 he was appointed missionary director of the Columbans in Asia. In 1948, Brennan was appointed Prefect Apostolic of Kwangju. After the outbreak of the Korean War, he was taken prisoner and killed by North Korean forces on September 24, 1950, in Taejon prison, alongside two other Columban missionaries Fr Thomas Cusack and Fr John "Jack" O'Brien.

During the short occupation, the North Korean forces seized Mokdong Catholic Church in Daejeon and used it as a building for the Social and Political Security Agency. Around this time, Brennan and other remaining clergy members of the church were arrested and imprisoned in Daejeon Prison. In September 1950, the North Korean army withdrew after massacring thousands of imprisoned civilians in various locations during their urgent retreat. Brennan's body, like that of many victims, has never been recovered.

== Veneration ==
Brennan's sainthood cause was opened in 2013, alongside those of his fellow Catholic martyrs in the Korean War.
