= Reperi =

Ancient Roman town in North Africa

Reperi was an ancient Roman town of Roman North Africa, in the Roman province of Mauretania Caesariensis. The exact location of the ancient town is now unknown, but is surmised to have been in northern Algeria. The town seems to have lasted until the Muslim conquest of the Maghreb.

The town was the seat of an ancient bishopric of the Roman Catholic Church called Dioecesis Reperitana which survives as a titular bishopric. Bishop Geliano, Reperi attended the synod assembled in Carthage in 484 by Vandal King, Huneric, after which the bishop was exiled. The current bishop is George James Rassas, of Chicago.
