= Shrine of Christ the King (Chicago) =

Historic church in Chicago, Illinois, United States

Coordinates: 41.7785°N 87.5958°W

The National Shrine of Christ the King
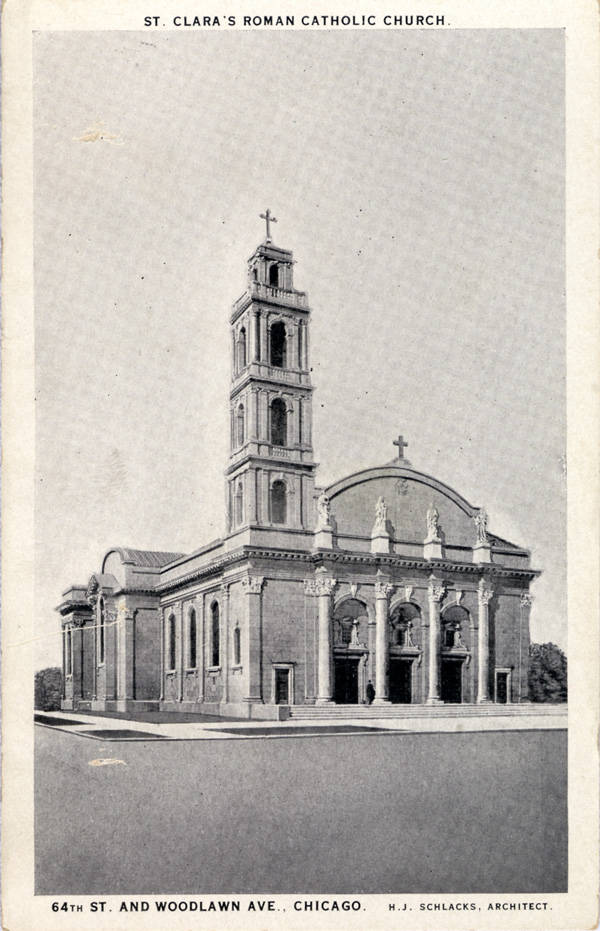
- The National Shrine of Christ the King
- Location: 6401 Woodlawn Avenue; Chicago, Illinois, 60637
- Country: United States
- Denomination: Catholic Church
- Tradition: Traditional Catholicism
- Religious institute: Institute of Christ the King, Previously Carmelites
- Website: https://institute-christ-king.org/chicago-home

History
- Former name(s): St. Clara, St. Clara-St. Cyril, St. Gelasius

Architecture
- Heritage designation: Chicago Landmark as of January 14, 2004
- Architect(s): Henry Schlacks; William Heyer
- Architectural type: Renaissance Revival

Administration
- Archdiocese: Archdiocese of Chicago

Clergy
- Archbishop: Blaise Cupich
- Rector: Canon Matthew Talarico

The Shrine of Christ the King, formerly known as St. Clara and St. Gelasius Church, is a historic Catholic church of the Archdiocese of Chicago in the Woodlawn neighborhood. It is now the National Headquarters of the American Province of the Institute of Christ the King Sovereign Priest, who are restoring the church after a 2015 fire.

== History ==
=== Founding ===
The original church was built to serve the Carmelites and their growing parish of St. Clara, which had been founded in 1894, to serve the majority-German community in Woodlawn following the population boom of the World's Columbian Exposition. Notable architect Henry Schlacks was contracted to design a new church, which is distinctively Renaissance Revival. When it was finished in 1928, it cost the equivalent of $7 million in 2016 or $9.39 million in 2025. With the canonization of Thérèse of Lisieux in 1925, the church also became the site of the National Shrine to Therese of Lisieux.

=== Decline ===
Major demographic change in the Woodlawn neighborhood began with Hansberry v. Lee, which prohibited racially-restrictive clauses in real estate contracts. By 1960, Woodlawn was majority African American. Father Tracy O'Sullivan, the pastor of the parish during this time, was involved in gang outreach and worked for nondiscriminatory affordable housing. The church was renamed St. Clara-St. Cyril in 1969, to reflect the consolidation of 2 parishes.

An April 1976 fire destroyed most of the original interior of the church, and parish membership struggled for the following decades. in 1990, a third parish, Holy Cross, was closed and merged into St. Clara, and the parish was renamed St. Gelasius, for the pope of African heritage, in a nod to the membership of the parish.

By June 2002, the number of regular worshipers had fallen below 100 per week, and the church was closed and slated for demolition. However, the greater Woodlawn community protested and petitioned for the building to be protected under the Chicago Landmarks Ordinance, and it was designated as such in 2004.

=== Institute of Christ the King ===
In 2004, then-Archbishop of Chicago Francis George invited the canons of the Institute of Christ the King Sovereign Priest to take over St. Clara, who established the Shrine of Christ the King in the church and situated the headquarters of the Institute's American Province there. The Institute began working on the interior of the church, and hosted community and cultural events which began to bring the church building back into the Woodlawn community.

On October 7, 2015, the building was struck by another fire, eliminating most of the work that had been done on the church since the Institute took possession of it in 2004. The shrine was nearly demolished yet again after being declared to be in 'hazardous condition', but was formally given to the Institute by the Archdiocese for work to continue on February 28, 2016. By 2020, $4 million had been invested into repairing the church, installing a new roofing system, new drainage, and reinforcement of the existing walls.

Notable architect William Heyer has been contracted for the restoration of the building, part of which will include placing a greater focus on the high altar, where an image of the Infant Christ the King will be enthroned against a sunburst background. Other side shrines will be dedicated to the Annunciation, the Nativity, the Epiphany, the Virgin Mary, Saint Joseph, Francis de Sales, Thomas Aquinas, Benedict of Nursia, Therese of the Child Jesus, and the Crucifixion.

In February of 2021, the Institute announced the acquisition of what was formerly the school building of St. Clara to serve as a center of parish life for the shrine, calling it the Holy Family House. The building will specifically serve the needs of the faithful of the shrine, as opposed to the administrative needs of the Province.

The shrine has been the site of protests against Cardinal Blase Cupich's implementation of the 2021 motu proprio Traditionis Custodes. Since August 1, 2022 the celebration of public Masses and Sacraments is suspended.

Chicago City Council Alderwoman Jeanette Taylor, a member of the Democratic Socialists of America, advocated for the resumption of Mass at the Shrine in a May 9 letter to Cardinal Cupich.
