= Blase Cupich =

American Catholic cardinal (born 1949)

His Eminence Blase Cupich
- Cardinal, Archbishop of Chicago
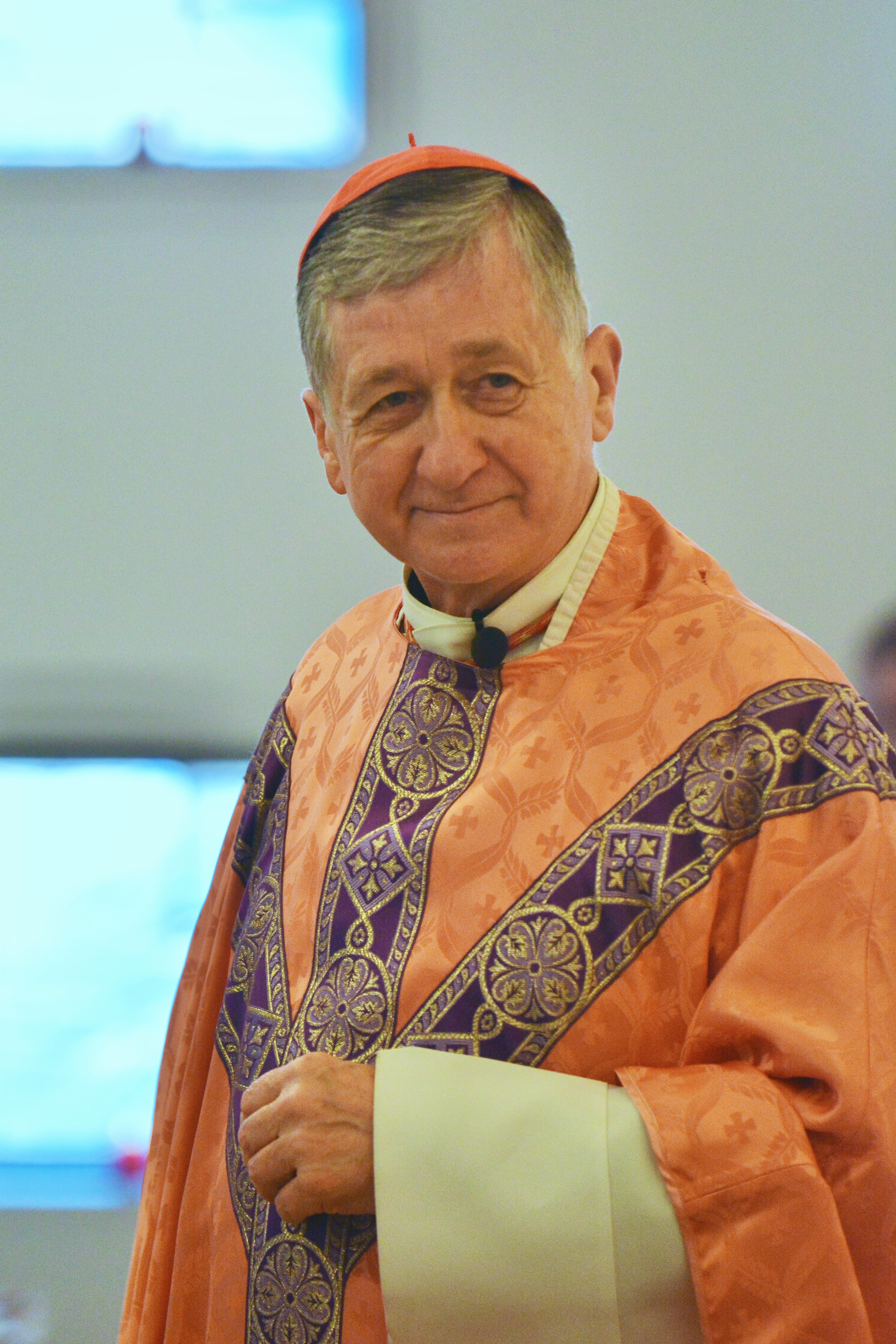
- Cupich preaches at a Mass in 2021 at Saint John Vianney College Seminary in St. Paul, Minnesota.
- Church: Catholic Church
- Archdiocese: Chicago
- Appointed: September 20, 2014
- Installed: November 18, 2014
- Predecessor: Francis George
- Other posts: Cardinal-Priest of S. Bartolomeo all'Isola; Member, Congregation for Bishops; Chancellor of Catholic Extension; Chancellor of University of Saint Mary of the Lake; Member, Pontifical Commission for Vatican City State
- Previous posts: Bishop of Spokane (2010‍–‍2014); Bishop of Rapid City (1998‍–‍2010)

Orders
- Ordination: August 16, 1975 by Daniel E. Sheehan
- Consecration: September 21, 1998 by Harry Joseph Flynn
- Created cardinal: November 19, 2016 by Pope Francis
- Rank: Cardinal-Priest

Personal details
- Born: Blase Joseph Cupich; March 19, 1949 (age 77) Omaha, Nebraska, US
- Education: University of St. Thomas; Saint John Vianney College Seminary; Pontifical North American College; Pontifical Gregorian University; Catholic University of America
- Motto: Peace be with you; John 20:21
- Styles
- Reference style: His Eminence; The Most Reverend Eminence
- Spoken style: Your Eminence
- Religious style: Cardinal
- Informal style: Cardinal
- See: Chicago

Ordination history
History
Priestly ordination
- Ordained by: Daniel Eugene Sheehan
Episcopal consecration
- Principal consecrator: Harry Joseph Flynn
- Co-consecrators: Elden Francis Curtiss, Charles Joseph Chaput
Cardinalate
- Elevated by: Pope Francis
Episcopal succession
Bishops consecrated by Blase Cupich as principal consecrator
- Ronald Aldon Hicks: 2018
- Mark Andrew Bartosic: 2018
- Robert Gerald Casey: 2018
- Michael George McGovern: 2020
- Louis Tylka: 2020
- Jeffrey Grob: 2020
- Robert J. Lombardo: 2020
- Kevin M. Birmingham: 2020
- Timothy James O’Malley: 2025
- Lawrence John Sullivan: 2025
- Jose Maria Garcia Maldonado: 2025
- Robert Miroslaw Fedek: 2025
- John Steven Siemianowski: 2025
- Godfrey Mullen: 2026

Blase Joseph Cupich (/ˈsuːpɪtʃ/ SOO-pitch; born March 19, 1949) is an American Catholic prelate serving as Archbishop of Chicago since 2014. He was made a cardinal in 2016.

Born in Omaha, Nebraska, Cupich was ordained a priest in 1975. He was named Bishop of Rapid City by Pope John Paul II in 1998. Cupich was then named Bishop of Spokane by Pope Benedict XVI in 2010. After being chosen by Pope Francis as Archbishop of Chicago, Cupich was installed there in 2014. In 2016, he was made a member of the Congregation for Bishops. He was appointed to the Congregation for Catholic Education in 2017.

== Early life and education ==
Cupich was born on March 19, 1949, in Omaha, Nebraska, into a family of Croatian descent. He was the third of the nine children of his father, also named Blase Cupich, a United States Postal Service letter carrier who later chaired the Sarpy County commission (1977–1988), championed Meals on Wheels and worked for the Society of Saint Vincent de Paul, and Mary (née Mayhan) Cupich, a homemaker. His paternal grandfather Blase Cupich, born in Donji Andrijevci near Slavonski Brod, immigrated to the United States as a teenager; his maternal grandmother Barbara Bahun, born in Donje Ladanje near Varaždin, (Note: She was baptised at the nearby Vinica.) arrived in Nebraska in 1917, where she married Ivan Majhen from Karlovac, Cupich's grandfather. All four of his grandparents found jobs in the Omaha meat-packing industry.

After receiving his initial education from the Benedictine Sts. Peter and Paul Elementary School in Omaha, Cupich attended Saint John Vianney Minor Seminary in Elkhorn, Nebraska, and then Archbishop Ryan High School in Omaha, Nebraska. He studied at Saint John Vianney Seminary at the University of St. Thomas in St. Paul, Minnesota, from 1969, obtaining his Bachelor of Arts degree in philosophy in 1971.

After receiving his undergraduate degree, Cupich went to Rome to reside at the seminary of the Pontifical North American College. He attended the Pontifical Gregorian University in Rome, earning a Bachelor of Sacred Theology degree in 1974 and a Master of Theology degree in 1975. In addition to Cupich, his class at the North American College included ten future American bishops and two future cardinals: James Harvey and Raymond Burke. Cupich speaks six languages, including English and Spanish.

== Ordination and ministry ==
Cupich was ordained to the priesthood for the Archdiocese of Omaha at Saints Peter and Paul Church in Omaha by Archbishop Daniel E. Sheehan on August 16, 1975.

After his 1975 ordination, the archdiocese assigned Cupich as both associate pastor at St. Margaret Mary Parish and instructor at Paul VI High School in Omaha. He was moved in 1978 to serve as director of the archdiocesan Office for Divine Worship and as chair of the Commission on Youth from 1978 to 1981. Cupich completed his graduate studies at the Catholic University of America in Washington, D.C., obtaining his licentiate there in 1979.

In 1980, Cupich worked as an instructor in the Continuing Education of Priests Program and Diaconate Formation at Creighton University in Omaha. He then transferred in 1981 to Washington to work as secretary of the nunciature to the United States, where he occasionally acted as spokesman for the mission. During this period, Cupich obtained his Doctorate of Sacred Theology in 1987 from Catholic University. His dissertation was entitled "Advent in the Roman Tradition: An Examination and Comparison of the Lectionary Readings as Hermeneutical Units in Three Periods".

Returning to Nebraska in 1987, the archdiocese assigned Cupich as pastor of St. Mary Parish in Bellevue from 1987. Two years later, he went to Columbus, Ohio, to serve as president-rector of the Pontifical College Josephinum. In 1996, after seven years in Columbus, Cupich came back to Nebraska, where he was appointed pastor of St. Robert Bellarmine Parish in Omaha in 1997.

== Bishop of Rapid City ==
Coat of arms as bishop of Rapid City

On July 6, 1998, Cupich was appointed as the seventh bishop of Rapid City by Pope John Paul II. Cupich was installed and consecrated at the Rushmore Plaza Civic Center in Rapid City by Archbishop Harry Flynn on September 21, 1998. His co-consecrators were Archbishops Elden Francis and Charles Chaput.

As bishop, Cupich banned children from receiving their first communion and confirmation in services using the Tridentine Mass. In 2002, Cupich prohibited a Traditional Mass community from celebrating the Paschal Triduum liturgies according to the 1962 form of the Roman Rite. He defended this move by saying,

"We're just looking for an opportunity on an annual basis for us to all worship together, for one moment of unity as a Catholic church ... it seems the day the Lord died for us all would be a good day to do it. That's all that this is about."

When Cupich moved to Spokane, the next bishop of Rapid City lifted these bans.

Cupich served on the United States Conference of Catholic Bishops' (USCCB) Committee for Young Adults during 2000 to 2003. During this period, the USCCB adopted its Dallas Charter, establishing procedures for handling accusation of priest misconduct. He served again on the USCCB's renamed Committee on Protection of Children and Young People from 2005 to 2006. Cupich became head of the committee in 2008.

Following the 2008 US presidential election, Cupich advised his fellow American bishops to find ways to work with the incoming Obama administration:

"Keep in mind a prophecy of denunciation quickly wears thin, and it seems to me what we need is a prophecy of solidarity, with the community we serve and the nation that we live in."

== Bishop of Spokane ==
Coat of arms as bishop of Spokane

On June 30, 2010, Pope Benedict XVI appointed Cupich as bishop of Spokane. He was installed on September 3, 2010, in a ceremony at Gonzaga University in Spokane, Washington.

In 2011, Cupich discouraged priests and seminarians in his diocese from demonstrating in front of Planned Parenthood clinics or supporting 40 Days for Life, an anti-abortion movement. Cupich later clarified his position, saying that he would not forbid priests from praying outside the clinics. However, he also said that;

"Decisions about abortion are not usually made in front of clinics – they’re made at 'kitchen tables and in living rooms and they frequently involve a sister, daughter, relative or friend who may have been pressured or abandoned by the man who fathered the child.'"

In February 2011, a Philadelphia grand jury investigation found that the Archdiocese of Philadelphia had allowed 37 priests to remain in active ministry despite accusations of abuse or inappropriate behavior. Cupich commented in March 2011:

This is confusing and demoralizing to many people. Everybody is very saddened by this because people are working very hard, each and every day, to implement the charter. And to have this happen is really just painful for all of us.

Cupich later called the events in Philadelphia "an anomaly", saying that the American bishops had implemented much of the Dallas Charter. Cupich then added: "If we want our people to trust us, we have to trust them. So we are doing our best to make sure that we are transparent with them." In June 2011, Cupich again pointed to the Dallas Charter, which he thought needed few modifications. He emphasized the need for proper implementation:

It's not the charter that's the problem. It seems to me to be whether or not the people are using the charter as a reference point appropriately. ... We consider the charter to have an iconic status. We believe the decisions we made in 2002 were significant. They involved not only a change in practice and policy, but I think culture as well, and so we are going to be reluctant to back off this commitment in any way to make any changes.

Over the course of three months in 2011, Cupich published "The New Roman Missal: A Time of Renewal", a historical overview on liturgical renewal to introduce the new English translation of the Roman Missal. He wrote favorably of moving from an ad orientem to a versus populum direction of the priest in the mass; he lamented those who did not accept the changes of the post-Vatican II Roman Missal; he wrote favorably about receiving the eucharist under both species and mass in the vernacular, non-Western inculturation into the liturgy, lay participation in the liturgy as a litmus test of active participation, and the simplification of rubrics.

In April 2012, Cupich supported the decision of Gonzaga University to invite Anglican Bishop Desmond Tutu to speak at its graduation ceremonies and receive an honorary degree. The Cardinal Newman Society and anti-abortion activists protested Tutu's appearance at Gonzaga.

Cupich in 2014 allowed Catholic Charities employees in the diocese to help people register for health care insurance under the 2010 Affordable Care Act, in contrast to most other bishops. He said:

We consider health care a basic human right and we believe that people should have access to affordable health care in order to live a full life. We want to make sure that people who do not have ready access to affordable care do. This is a program that does allow this to take place.

== Archbishop of Chicago ==
Coat of arms as Archbishop of Chicago before being elevated to cardinal

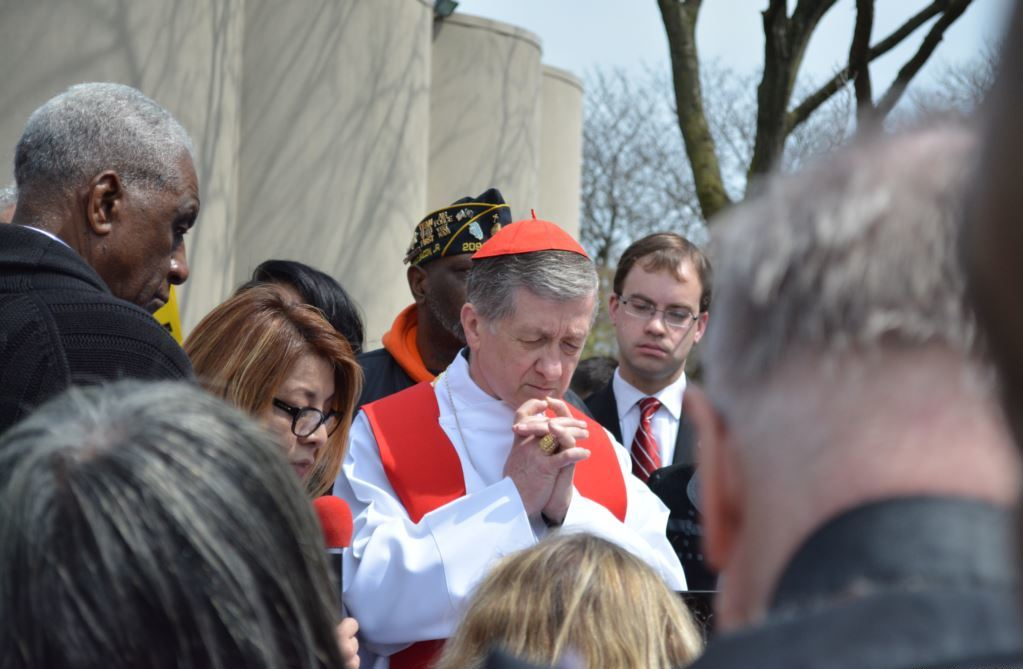
Cupich praying at a 2017 Good Friday demonstration against gun violence in Chicago with Rep. David S. Olsen (on the right)

On September 20, 2014, Pope Francis accepted the resignation of Cardinal George as archbishop of Chicago and named Cupich to succeed him. Cupich was installed there on November 18, 2014. Before his installation in Chicago, Cupich announced he would live in a suite of rooms at Holy Name Cathedral rather than in the archbishop's residence in the Gold Coast neighborhood of Chicago.

Cupich announced a major reorganization of the archdiocese on April 30, 2015. Approximately 50 archdiocesan employees accepted early retirement packages offered by the archdiocese. He appointed the seminary rector, director of the metropolitan tribunal, and chancellor, while confirming the Reverend Ronald Hicks as vicar general and Betsy Bohlen, formerly the CFO, as chief operating officer. Cupich created a new Hispanic Council (Consejo), headquartered in a church in Cicero, Illinois, in a heavily Hispanic area. In March 2021 the archdiocese announced plans to combine 13 parishes into five clusters, to minister to regions south of Chicago.

Writing in the Chicago Tribune in August 2015, during the Planned Parenthood 2015 undercover videos controversy, Cupich reiterated Cardinal George's call for "our commitment as a nation to a consistent ethic of life". He wrote that "commerce in the remains of defenseless children" is "particularly repulsive" and that,

"We should be no less appalled by the indifference toward the thousands of people who die daily for lack of decent medical care; who are denied rights by a broken immigration system and by racism; who suffer in hunger, joblessness and want; who pay the price of violence in gun-saturated neighborhoods; or who are executed by the state in the name of justice."

Reverend Raymond J. de Souza, in the National Catholic Register, criticized what he claimed was Cupich's "inconsistent" practice of the "consistent life ethic", offered by Cardinal Joseph Bernardin in the mid-1980s, arguing that it "mainly serve[s] to downplay the urgency of the abortion question".

On December 27, 2021, following the issuing of the motu proprio Traditionis custodes in July and the subsequent issuing of guidelines released by the Congregation for Divine Worship and the Discipline of the Sacraments in December, Cupich imposed restrictions on the celebration of the Traditional Latin Mass in the archdiocese. He banned the usage of the Traditional Rite on the first Sunday of every month, Christmas, the Triduum, Easter Sunday, and Pentecost Sunday. Cupich was supportive of the motu proprio Traditionis custodes for promoting a return to a unified, post-Vatican II Ordinary Form of the Mass.

In June 2022, the Vatican named Cupich to the Dicastery for Divine Worship and the Discipline of the Sacraments. On July 16, 2022, it was leaked that Cupich was planning on shutting down the parishes in Chicago operated by the Institute of Christ the King Sovereign Priest which celebrates Mass according to the 1962 edition of the Roman Missal. Cupich was reportedly planning to revoke the ministry of the priest belonging to the institute to operate in the diocese starting on August 1, 2022. On August 1, 2022, the institute suspended the celebration of public Masses and sacraments at the Shrine of Christ the King Church, its headquarters. The decision is believed to have been caused by pressure applied by Cupich.

On August 19, 2024, Cupich delivered the opening invocation at the 2024 Democratic National Convention in Chicago. Some conservative Catholics and anti-abortion activists criticized Cupich for not addressing abortion in his invocation.

In November 2024, Cupich reinstated the Reverend Martin Marren to active ministry. This action came after the dismissal of the alleged child sexual abuse case inquiry by the Illinois Department of Child and Family Services and by the Independent Review Board of the archdiocesan Office for the Protection of Children and Youth.

On December 11, 2024, Cupich published a letter, advising Catholics not to kneel when receiving the eucharist, claiming that standing was "the norm established by Holy See for the universal church and approved by the U.S. Conference of Catholic Bishops", as well as saying:

"No one should engage in a gesture that calls attention to oneself or disrupts the flow of the procession. That would be contrary to the norms and tradition of the church, which all the faithful are urged to respect and observe."

On September 22, 2025, the Archdiocese of Chicago announced it will honor Illinois Senator Dick Durbin with a lifetime achievement award for his political advocacy of immigrant communities. This has sparked controversy due to Durbin's support for abortion rights. Critics included several active bishops, including Thomas Paprocki, who upheld a predecessor's decision to prohibit Durbin from receiving Holy Communion in the Diocese of Springfield. Cupich responded to these criticisms by stating he was "engaging in dialogue" with Durbin and cited the late Chicago archbishop Joseph Bernardin in saying that Catholic teaching on the dignity of life concerns more than the issue of abortion. Durbin ultimately declined the award.

=== Synod on the Family ===
In September 2015, Pope Francis named Cupich to participate in the synod of bishops in Rome in October 2015, adding him to those proposed by the USCCB. There he supported proposals to provide a path for remarried Catholics to receive the eucharist and to respect the decisions that those who remarry or of LGBTQ Catholics in relationships "make about their spiritual lives". Cupich identified himself with a pastoral approach that begins with encountering each person's specific circumstances and highlighted the importance of conscience. Cupich said,

"I try to help people along the way. And people come to a decision in good conscience. Then our job with the church is to help them move forward and respect that. The conscience is inviolable. And we have to respect that when they make decisions and I've always done that."

=== Cardinal ===
On October 9, 2016, Pope Francis announced that Cupich would be elevated to the College of Cardinals on November 19, 2016. At the consistory held on that day, he received the rank of cardinal-priest and was assigned the titular church of San Bartolomeo all'Isola in Rome.

Cupich was a cardinal elector in the 2025 papal conclave that elected Chicago native Robert Prevost as Pope Leo XIV.

On 15 October 2025, Pope Leo named him a member of the Pontifical Commission for Vatican City State.

==== Viganò controversy ====
In August 2018, Archbishop Carlo Viganò, the former apostolic nuncio to the United States, released an 11-page letter describing a series of warnings to the Vatican regarding sexual misconduct by then Cardinal Theodore McCarrick. Viganò claimed that McCarrick and others "orchestrated" the appointments of Cupich as archbishop of Chicago and Bishop Joseph Tobin as archbishop of Newark. Cupich responded, saying that Viganò told Cupich at the time of his appointment as archbishop that it was "news of great joy", congratulating him and expressed his support. Cupich later said, "I don't think that I needed one person to be my advocate." In an August 2018 interview, Cupich said the language of the Viganò letter seemed political:

"It was so scattershot that it was hard to read if it was ideological in some ways, or it was payback to others for personal slights that he had because there were some people who in his past he felt had mistreated him." Cupich said he was "taken aback" by the negative language Viganò used about him.

In an interview with WMAQ-TV that same month, Cupich said,

"The Pope has a bigger agenda. He's got to get on with other things—of talking about the environment and protecting migrants and carrying on the work of the Church. We're not going to go down a rabbit hole on this."

Cupich later stated that his remarks to WMAQ were not referring to abuse by clergy. When asked about those criticizing Francis, Cupich responded, "Quite frankly, they also don't like him because he's a Latino." Francis was born and raised in Argentina, after both his father and maternal grandparents immigrated to that country from Northern Italy.

== Other offices ==
Within the USCCB, Cupich has served as chair of the Bishops' Committee on the Protection for Children and Young People since 2008 and he is a member of the Ad Hoc Committee on Scripture Translation. He has served as a member of the Committee on the Liturgy, the Communications Committee and the Ad Hoc Committee to Oversee the Use of the Catechism. He chaired the USCCB Committee on Aid to the Church in Central and Eastern Europe in 2014, and remained a member of it in 2020.

Cupich is also a board member of the Catholic Extension Society and the Catholic Mutual Relief Society. He has served on the board of St. Paul Seminary in St. Paul, Minnesota, as the episcopal advisor of the local Serra Club, and as a board member of the National Pastoral Life Center. He began a three-year term as chair of the National Catholic Education Association in March 2013.

In July 2016, Francis named Cupich a member of the Congregation for Bishops. After being named to the College of Cardinals, Cupich was also appointed a member of the Congregation for Catholic Education in 2017. Members of Vatican congregations normally have five-year terms.

Cupich is the Catholic co-chair of the National Catholic-Muslim Dialogue, sponsored by the Committee on Ecumenical and Interreligious Affairs of the USCCB. He is chancellor of the University of Saint Mary of the Lake in Mundelein, Illinois.

Cupich is the Grand Prior of the USA North Central Lieutenancy of the Equestrian Order of the Holy Sepulchre of Jerusalem.

== Viewpoints ==
Widely seen as a political liberal within Catholic circles, Cupich has been described by secular journalists as a "moderate," "a leader in the mold of Pope Francis," and a "leading voice of the progressive sector" of the American Church. He has cited the popularity of Pope John XXIII, the reforms of the Second Vatican Council, and the Catholic presidency of John F. Kennedy, as inspiration for dedicating his life to the Roman Church.

In 2017, during his visit to Zagreb, Croatia, he expressed his hope for an imminent canonization of Alojzije Stepinac.

=== Abortion ===
During the 2004 US presidential election, Cupich refused to support demands that priests deny the eucharist to Catholic politicians who support abortion rights for women. He said,

"We cannot cherry-pick particular issues. We have to be willing to talk about all issues. Our position begins with protecting the unborn, but it doesn't end there."

Two years later, as South Dakota voters considered a referendum that would ban abortion except to save the mother's life, Cupich called for "public dialogue ... marked by civility and clarity". He proposed three conditions for the conduct of political debate:

1. It must be recognized that both the issue of abortion and legal restrictions on abortion are inevitably moral questions informed by moral values; 2. There should be agreement that any discussion of abortion and the law must recognize both the suffering of the unborn children in abortion and the suffering of pregnant women in dire circumstances; 3. There must be a commitment to dialogue that is civil, interactive and substantial.

In 2018, Cupich censured Illinois Governor Bruce Rauner for approving abortion rights after allegedly promising not to, and at a March for Life rally in Chicago, Cupich said abortion is an important issue and argued that it is in other issues that the Church's witness seems to be deficient, saying "We also have to care about that baby once that baby is born."

=== Gun violence ===
Cupich wrote on January 22, 2013, referencing the murder of 20 children at Sandy Hook Elementary School in Newtown, Connecticut, a few weeks earlier, that

"The truth will win out and we have to believe that a nation whose collective heart can break and grieve for babies slaughtered in Newtown has the capacity and God's grace to one day grieve for the babies killed in the womb."

In the aftermath of the 2022 shooting at Robb Elementary School in Uvalde, Texas, Cupich said via Twitter: "The Second Amendment did not come down from Sinai. The right to bear arms will never be more important than human life. Our children have rights too. And our elected officials have a moral duty to protect them. As I reflect on this latest American massacre, I keep returning to the questions: Who are we as a nation if we do not act to protect our children? What do we love more: our instruments of death or our future?"

=== Libertarianism ===
In June 2014, Cupich addressed a conference at Catholic University on the Catholic response to libertarianism, which he criticized in detail:

By uncoupling human dignity from the solidarity it implies, libertarians move in a direction that not only has enormous consequences for the meaning of economic life and the goal of politics in a world of globalization, but in a direction which is inconsistent with Catholic Social Teaching, particularly as it is developed by Pope Francis.

As an alternative to libertarianism, Cupich advocated some of Pope Francis' views, including his "different approach to how we know and learn" by "making sure that ideas do dialogue with reality" and his call "for a shift from an economics of exclusion to a culture of encounter and the need for accompaniment", in which, he explains, "One encounters another, not one self. This emphasis on encounter and accompaniment unmasks the difficulty with libertarianism, for its stated goal is to increase human autonomy as the priority." He closed by expressing his "serious concerns about libertarianism that impact the pastoral life", the difficulty of counseling young people whose "interior life is at risk in a world that encourages them to be caught up in their own interests". Francis' critique of contemporary capitalism is, in his view, "tethered to a rich tradition of ... challenging economic and political approaches which fall short of placing human dignity in all its fullness as the priority."

=== Racism ===
Shortly before the 2008 US presidential election, Cupich published an essay in America Magazine on the question of race that said:

As we draw near an election day on which one of the major party candidates for president is for the first time a person of African-American ancestry, we should be able to do so with a sense that whatever the outcome, America has crossed another threshold in healing the wounds that racism has inflicted on our nation's body politic for our entire history. However, in view of recent media reports regarding race-based voting, this potentially healing moment could turn into the infliction of one more wound if racism appears to determine the outcome. Because of that menacing possibility, it is worth recalling for Catholics and all Americans. ... [R]acism is a sin.

=== Same-sex marriage ===
Before the November 2012 referendum on the legalization of same-sex marriage in Washington State, Cupich wrote a pastoral letter on the subject. He noted that many people viewed same-sex marriage in terms of personal sympathy and "a matter of equality":

Proponents of the redefinition of marriage are often motivated by compassion for those who have shown courage in refusing to live in the fear of being rejected for their sexual orientation. It is a compassion that is very personal, for those who have suffered and continue to suffer are close and beloved friends and family members. It is also a compassion forged in reaction to tragic national stories of violence against homosexuals, of verbal attacks that demean their human dignity, and of suicides by teens who have struggled with their sexual identity or have been bullied because of it. As a result, supporters of the referendum often speak passionately of the need to rebalance the scales of justice.

Cupich then called for "a substantial public debate ... carried on with respect, honesty and conviction" and asked for "careful consideration" of the church's position on the referendum. He concluded with a statement of tolerance:

I also want to be very clear that in stating our position the Catholic Church has no tolerance for the misuse of this moment to incite hostility towards homosexual persons or promote an agenda that is hateful and disrespectful of their human dignity.

Cupich explained the Catholic Church's position on the Washington referendum: that Washington's registered domestic partnerships already gave same-sex couples all the legal rights associated with marriage, so equality was not an issue; that the referendum attempts to make different-sex and same-sex relationships identical, not equal; that it ignores the real differences between men and women and how "sons and daughters learn about gender from the way it is lived by their mothers and fathers"; that removing the terms mother and father from legal documents transforms how we think about family relationships; that the impact on other features of marriage law, such as limiting marriage by relatives or restricting marriage to two people, are unknown; and that the question is not whether a religious or secular definition of marriage will prevail: "Marriage existed either before the church or the state. It is written in our human nature."

With respect to offering the eucharist to Catholics in same-sex relationships, in 2015 he said:

My role as a pastor is to help them to discern what the will of God is by looking at the objective moral teaching of the Church and yet, at the same time, helping them through a period of discernment to understand what God is calling them to at that point. It's for everybody. I think that we have to make sure that we don't pigeonhole one group as though they are not part of the human family, as though there's a different set of rules for them. That would be a big mistake.

In a 2025 column on Outreach, after several listening sessions with LGBTQ Catholics, Cupich wrote:

Contrary to what others often say or think about LGBTQ people, the idea that they are uniquely obsessed with sexual satisfaction is a myth (as if we don’t have abundant examples of cultural obsession with heterosexual gratification). Rather, what’s been clear in my conversations with LGBTQ Catholics is that they place a high priority on expressions of love and intimacy that comport with church teaching. In fact, they tend to see a relationship with a partner as an attempt to establish stability in their lives in the face of the promiscuity that is sometimes present in both the gay and straight communities.

== See also ==
- Catholic Church in the United States
- Historical list of the Catholic bishops of the United States
- List of Catholic bishops of the United States
- Lists of patriarchs, archbishops, and bishops
- Sexual abuse scandal in the Catholic archdiocese of Chicago

== Notes ==
Catholic Church titles
Preceded by Francis George, OMI	Archbishop of Chicago; 2014–present	Incumbent
Preceded by Francis George, OMI	Cardinal-Priest of San Bartolomeo all’Isola; 2016–present	Incumbent
Preceded by William S. Skylstad	Bishop of Spokane; 2010–2014	Succeeded by Thomas Anthony Daly
Preceded by Charles Joseph Chaput, OFM Cap	Bishop of Rapid City; 1998–2010	Succeeded by Robert Dwayne Gruss
