= Francis J. Kane =

American Catholic bishop

His Excellency, The Most Reverend Francis Joseph Kane
- Auxiliary Bishop Emeritus of Chicago; Titular Bishop of Sault Sainte Marie
- Archdiocese: Chicago
- Appointed: January 24, 2003
- Installed: March 19, 2003
- Retired: July 3, 2018
- Other post: Titular Bishop of Sault Sainte Marie

Orders
- Ordination: May 14, 1969 by John Cody
- Consecration: March 19, 2003 by Francis George, Raymond E. Goedert, and Ricardo Watty Urquidi

Personal details
- Born: October 30, 1942 (age 83) Chicago, Illinois, US
- Education: Niles College; St. Mary of the Lake Seminary
- Motto: Thy kingdom come

Styles of Francis Joseph Kane
- Reference style: His Excellency; The Most Reverend
- Spoken style: Your Excellency
- Religious style: Bishop

Francis Joseph Kane (born October 30, 1942) is an American prelate of the Catholic Church. Kane served as an auxiliary bishop of the Archdiocese of Chicago in Illinois from 2003 to 2018.

== Biography ==
=== Early life and education ===
Born on October 30, 1942, in Chicago, Illinois, Francis Kane attended Our Lady of Peace Elementary School and graduated from Archbishop Quigley Preparatory Seminary in Chicago in 1961. He then earned a Bachelor of Arts degree from Niles College in Chicago in 1963, and a Bachelor of Sacred Theology degree from St. Mary of the Lake Seminary in Mundelein, Illinois, in 1969.

=== Ordination and ministry ===
Kane was ordained to the priesthood by Cardinal John Cody at St. Mary of the Lake Seminary on May 14, 1969. He then served as associate pastor at St. John Fisher Parish in Chicago until 1975, and was also named associate director of the archdiocesan Center for Pastoral Ministry in 1973.

Kane served as associate pastor at St. Nicholas of Tolentine Parish in Chicago from 1975 to 1979, and director of the Office for the Ministry of Peace and Justice (1979-1985) and director of the Office of Evangelization and Christian Life (1983-1993). Kane was director of Catholic Relief Services from 1982 to 1987. From 1993 to his appointment as auxiliary bishop in 2003, Kane served as pastor of St. Joseph Parish in Wilmette, Illinois. He also became dean of Deanery A in 1999, serving until 2003.

=== Auxiliary Bishop of Chicago ===
On January 24, 2003, Pope John Paul II appointed Kane auxiliary bishop of Chicago and titular bishop of Sault Sainte Marie. He was consecrated on March 19, 2003, by Cardinal Francis George, with Bishops Raymond Goedert and Ricardo Urquidi serving as co-consecrators, at Holy Name Cathedral in Chicago.

As auxiliary bishop, Kane also served as episcopal vicar for Vicariate II and as the cardinal's liaison for the Annual Catholic Appeal and for the Office for Lay Ecclesial Ministry. Kane was also a member of Aid for Women and the Parish Evaluation Project (PEP), and served on the board of directors of St. Joseph College Seminary in Chicago. Within the United States Conference of Catholic Bishops, Kane was a member of the Committee on Catholic Education and the Subcommittee on the Catholic Campaign for Human Development. He is a member of the Order of the Holy Sepulchre and the Knights of Columbus.

On January 16, 2014, Kane apologized to victims of sexual abuse by priests in the archdiocese. He said that the archdiocese had operated on the mistaken belief that it could rehabilitate abusive priests and safely return them to parish assignments with monitoring. He said:

We found out that isn't true, that was a mistake. We didn't realize the depth of this terrible, terrible sin and crime . . . child sex abuse.

=== Retirement and legacy ===
On July 3, 2018, Pope Francis accepted Kane's resignation as auxiliary bishop of Chicago after he had reached the retirement age of 75.

== See also ==
- Catholic Church hierarchy
- Catholic Church in the United States
- Historical list of the Catholic bishops of the United States
- List of Catholic bishops of the United States
- Lists of patriarchs, archbishops, and bishops
