= George James Rassas =

American Roman Catholic priest

His Excellency, The Most Reverend George James Rassas
- Auxiliary Bishop Emeritus of Chicago; Titular Bishop of Reperi
- Archdiocese: Chicago
- Appointed: December 1, 2005
- Installed: February 2, 2006
- Retired: July 3, 2018
- Other post: Titular Bishop of Reperi
- Previous posts: Associate Pastor at Queen of the Rosary Church in Elk Grove Village, Illinois (1968–1974); Associate Pastor at St. Genevieve Church in Chicago, Illinois (1974–1983); Associate Pastor at St. Norbert Church in Northbrook, Illinois (1983–1988); Associate Pastor at Sacred Heart Church in Winnetka, Illinois (1988–1990); Pastor of The Church of St. Mary in Lake Forest, Illinois(1990–2004); Vicar general of the Archdiocese of Chicago (2004–2005)

Orders
- Ordination: May 2, 1968 by John Cody
- Consecration: February 2, 2006 by Francis George, Gerald Frederick Kicanas, and José Antonio Eguren

Personal details
- Born: George James Rassas; May 26, 1942 (age 84) Baltimore, Maryland, US
- Education: University of Notre Dame; Archbishop Quigley Preparatory Seminary; Niles College; University of St. Mary of the Lake; Loyola University
- Motto: Tene clavum fidei (Hold fast the rudder of faith)

Styles of George James Rassas
- Reference style: His Excellency; The Most Reverend
- Spoken style: Your Excellency
- Religious style: Bishop

George James Rassas (born May 26, 1942) is an American prelate of the Roman Catholic Church. He served as an auxiliary bishop of the Archdiocese of Chicago in Illinois from 2005 to 2018.

== Biography ==
=== Early life and education ===
The oldest of six children, George Rassas was born on May 26, 1942, in Baltimore, Maryland, to George and Frances (née McGuire) Rassas. His father, the son of Greek immigrants, converted to Catholicism from the Greek Orthodox Church while attending the University of Notre Dame. George met Frances after sustaining an injury during a football game and then being treated at Mercy Hospital in Chicago by her father, an Irish Catholic doctor.

The Rassas family moved in 1945 to Winnetka, Illinois, where they became members of Ss. Faith, Hope, and Charity Parish. The younger George Rassas graduated from Archbishop Quigley Preparatory Seminary in Chicago in 1961. He then attended Niles College in Chicago and the University of St. Mary of the Lake in Mundelein, Illinois, obtaining a philosophy degree. After finishing college, Rassas served as a deacon at St. Thaddeus Parish in Chicago for a year.

=== Ordination and ministry ===
On May 2, 1968, Rassas was ordained to the priesthood for the Archdiocese of Chicago by Cardinal John Cody. After his ordination, Rassas was named as an associate pastor at Queen of the Rosary Parish in Elk Grove Village, Illinois. In 1974, he earned a Master of Counseling Psychology degree from Loyola University Chicago and was moved to St. Genevieve Parish in Chicago.

In 1975, Rassas was appointed director of the Catholic Family Consultation Service, serving there until 1984. He also became associate moderator of the archdiocesan Council of Catholic Women.

In 1983, Rassas' pastoral assignment was changed to St. Norbert Parish in Northbrook, Illinois. He was awarded a Doctor of Pastoral Theology degree from St. Mary of the Lake in 1984. That same year, while still at St. Norbert, he was named director of the Office of Family Ministries. In 1988, Rassas was posted to Sacred Heart Parish in Winnetka.

In 1990, Rassas was assigned as pastor of St. Mary Parish in Lake Forest, Illinois. In 1999, Rassas assumed the additional duty as chair of the Presbyteral Council, serving there until 2002. In 2004, Rassas was named vicar general of the archdiocese.

=== Auxiliary Bishop of Chicago ===
On December 1, 2005, Pope Benedict XVI appointed Rassas as auxiliary bishop of the Archdiocese of Chicago and titular bishop of Reperi. He received his episcopal consecration on February 2, 2006 by Cardinal Francis George, with Bishops Gerald Kicanas and José Eguren Anselmi serving as co-consecrators, at Holy Name Cathedral in Chicago.

Rassas was appointed as the episcopal vicar for Vicariate 1, which includes Lake and Cook counties in Illinois He was a founding board member and board chair for Cristo Rey St. Martin College Prep in Waukegan, Illinois.

=== Retirement and legacy ===
On July 3, 2018, Pope Francis accepted Rassas' letter of resignation as auxiliary bishop of the Archdiocese of Chicago after he reached the mandatory retirement age of 75.

Catholic Church titles
| Preceded by – | Auxiliary Bishop of Chicago; 2005–2018 | Succeeded by – |
