= Archdiocese of Chicago =

Latin Catholic jurisdiction in the US

Coordinates: 41.8960°N 87.6277°W

Archdiocese of Chicago Archidiœcesis Chicagiensis
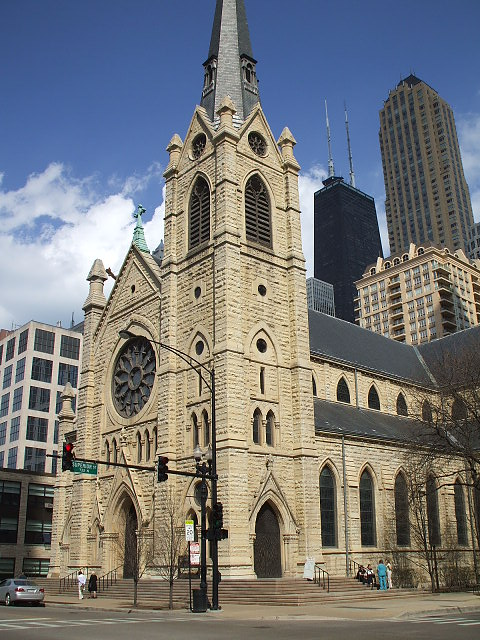
- Holy Name Cathedral

- Coat of arms

- Flag

Location
- Country: United States
- Territory: Counties of Cook and Lake
- Ecclesiastical province: Chicago

Statistics
- Area: 1,411 sq mi (3,650 km^{2})
- Population: Total; Catholics: (as of 2026); 5.9 million; 1,947,000 (33%)
- Parishes: 216 (As of 1/2026)
- Schools: 146 archdiocesan-run 34 non-archdiocesan-run

Information
- Denomination: Catholic Church
- Sui iuris church: Latin Church
- Rite: Roman Rite
- Established: November 28, 1843; 182 years ago
- Cathedral: Holy Name Cathedral
- Patron saint: Immaculate Conception
- Secular priests: 638

Current leadership
- Pope: Leo XIV
- Archbishop: Blase Joseph Cupich
- Auxiliary Bishops: Mark Andrew Bartosic; Robert J. Lombardo; Timothy J. O'Malley; Lawrence J. Sullivan; José Maria Garcia Maldonado; Robert Fedek; John S. Siemianowski
- Vicar General: Lawrence J. Sullivan
- Bishops emeritus: Francis J. Kane; George J. Rassas; Joseph N. Perry; Andrew P. Wypych

Map
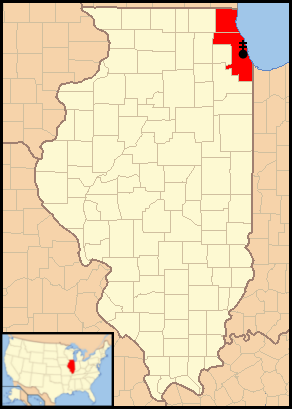

Website
- archchicago.org

The Archdiocese of Chicago (Latin: Archidiœcesis Chicagiensis) is an archdiocese of the Catholic Church located in Northeastern Illinois, in the United States. The Vatican erected it as a diocese in 1843 and elevated it to an archdiocese in 1880. Cardinal Blase Joseph Cupich is the archbishop. The cathedral parish for the archdiocese is Holy Name Cathedral in Chicago.

The archdiocese serves over 2 million Catholics in Cook and Lake counties, an area of 1,411 square miles (3,650 km^{2}). It is the metropolitan see of the province of Chicago. The province covers all the dioceses in Illinois.

== History ==
=== 1600 to 1800 ===
During the 17th century, the Illinois Country was part of the French colony of New France, which was under the jurisdiction of the Diocese of Quebec.

The first Catholic presence in present-day Illinois was that of a French Jesuit missionary, Jacques Marquette, who landed at the mouth of the Chicago River on December 4, 1674. A cabin he built for the winter became the first European settlement in the area. Marquette published his survey of the new territories and soon more French missionaries and settlers arrived.

In 1696, a French Jesuit, Jacques Gravier, founded the Illinois mission among the Illinois, Miami, Kaskaskia and others of the Illiniwek confederacy in the Mississippi River and Illinois River valleys. During this period, the French-Canadian and Native American Catholics in the region were under the jurisdiction of the bishop of the Diocese of Quebec in New France.

With the end of the French and Indian War in 1763, the British took control of Illinois. Their rule ended after the American Revolution in 1783 when the British ceded Illinois and other Midwestern territories to the new United States. In 1795, the Potawatomi nation signed the Treaty of Greenville that ended the Northwest Indian War, ceding to the United States its land at the mouth of the Chicago River.

=== 1800 to 1840 ===
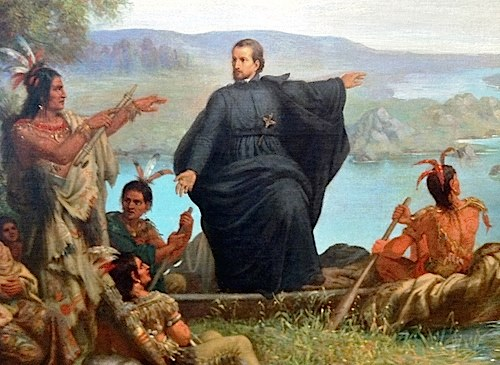
Marquette (1869)

In 1789, Pope Pius VI erected the Diocese of Baltimore, covering the entire United States. In 1822, Alexander Beaubien became the first person to be baptized as a Catholic in Chicago. By 1826, the Vatican had created the Diocese of St. Louis, covering Illinois and other areas of the American Midwest.

In 1833, Jesuit missionaries in Chicago wrote to Bishop Joseph Rosati of St. Louis, pleading for a priest to serve the 100 Catholics in the city. In response, Rosati appointed John Saint Cyr. a French priest, as the first resident priest in Chicago. Saint Cyr celebrated his first mass in a log cabin on Lake Street in 1833. At a cost of $400, Saint Cyr constructed St. Mary, a small wooden church near Lake and State Streets. The first Catholic church in the city, it was dedicated in 1833. The next year, Bishop Simon Bruté of the new Diocese of Vincennes in Indiana, visited Chicago. He found only one priest serving over 400 Catholics. Brulé asked permission from Rosati to send several priests from Vincennes to Chicago.

In 1837, Saint Cyr retired as pastor of St. Mary and was replaced by James O'Meara. He moved St. Mary to another wooden structure at Wabash Avenue and Madison Street. When O'Meara left Chicago, Saint Palais demolished the wooden church and replaced it with a brick structure.

=== 1840 to 1850 ===
Pope Gregory XVI erected the Diocese of Chicago on November 28, 1843. It included all of the State of Illinois, taking territory from the Dioceses of St. Louis and Vincennes. In 1844, Gregory XVI named William Quarter of Ireland as the first bishop of Chicago. On his arrival in Chicago, Quarter summoned a synod of the 32 priests to begin the organization of the diocese.

Quarter secured the passage of a state law in 1845 that declared the bishop of Chicago an incorporated entity, giving him the power to hold real estate and other property in trust for religious purposes. This law would allow Quarter and future prelates to construct churches, colleges, and universities in the archdiocese.

Quarter invited the Sisters of Mercy to come to Chicago in 1846. Over the next six years, the sisters founded schools, two orphanages and an academy. One of their projects was the St. Xavier Female Seminary, a secondary school that attracted students from wealthy Catholic and Protestant families. St. Mary of the Lake University, the first university or college in Chicago, opened in 1846. Quarter died on April 10, 1848.

On October 3, 1848, Pope Pius IX appointed James Van de Velde of the Society of Jesus as the second bishop of Chicago. During his brief tenure in Chicago, Van de Velde built two elementary schools, a night school for adults, an employment office, and a boarding house for working women. After the 1849 cholera outbreak in Chicago, he established residences for the many children orphaned by the epidemic.

=== 1850 to 1860 ===
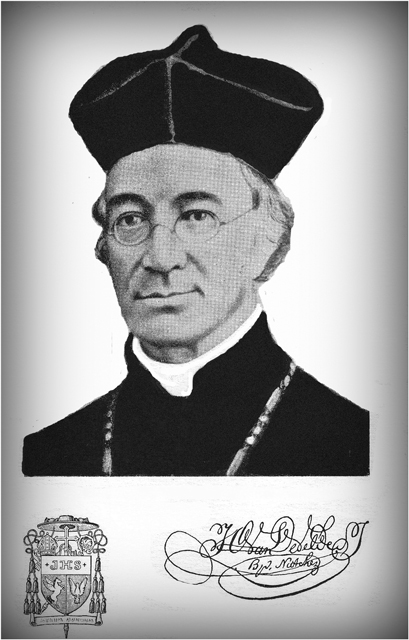
Bishop Van De Velde (pre-1855)

Van De Velde opened the Illinois Hospital of the Lakes in 1851, the first hospital in Chicago. Suffering from severe rheumatism during the harsh Chicago winters, Van De Velde persuaded the pope in 1852 to appoint him as bishop of the Diocese of Natchez in Mississippi. The Vatican erected the Diocese of Quincy in 1853, taking Southern Illinois from the Diocese of Chicago. The Diocese of Quincy later became the Diocese of Alton and then the Diocese of Springfield in Illinois.

In December 1853, Anthony O'Regan was appointed as the third bishop of Chicago by Pius IX. During his tenure, O'Regan purchased property for the construction of several churches and Calvary Cemetery in Chicago. A systematic administrator and strong disciplinarian, O'Regan generated significant dissatisfaction among his clergy. Many French-speaking congregants accused him of stealing their property. In 1855, the Sisters of the Holy Cross founded an industrial school in Chicago for girls, both Catholic and non-Catholic.

Frustrated by the opposition he faced in the diocese, O'Regan submitted his resignation in 1857 to the Vatican, which accepted it in June 1858. The pope appointed Bishop James Duggan of St. Louis as the apostolic administrator of the diocese.

On January 21, 1859, Pius IX named Duggan as the fourth bishop of Chicago. Duggan faced challenges in Chicago: the legacy of the decade-long lack of leadership in the diocese, the aftereffects of the financial panic of 1857, and of the American Civil War. German Catholics were hostile to an Irish bishop. Irish-born priests were hostile to Dugan's stand against the Fenian Brotherhood: he denied the sacraments to anyone tied to this secret society. Some clergy faulted Duggan for failing to support the University of St. Mary of the Lake, which closed in 1866 due to financial problems and low enrollment. In 1859, Dugan founded the House of the Good Shepherd in Chicago as a residence for "delinquent women."

=== 1860 to 1880 ===
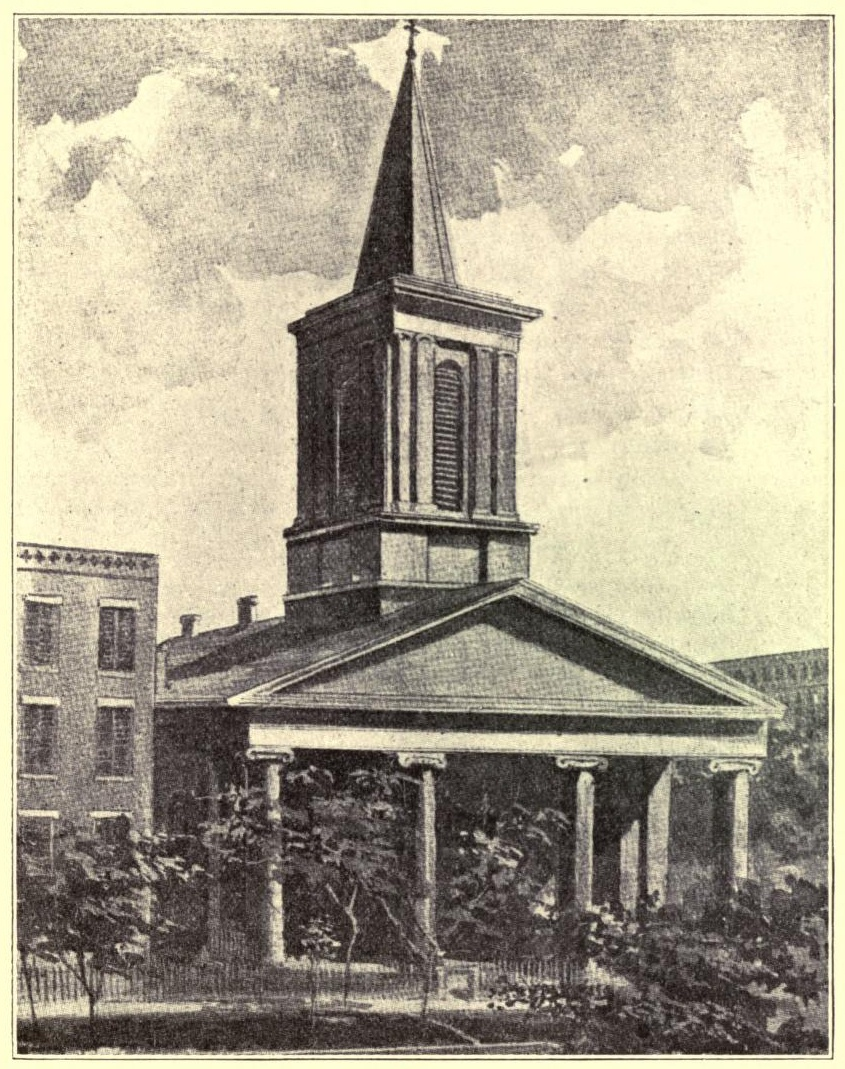
St. Mary's Cathedral, Chicago. Destroyed by fire in 1871.

After Duggan returned from the Second Plenary Council of Baltimore in 1866, he began to exhibit sign of mental instability. When he left Chicago for a European trip, several diocesan priests wrote to the Vatican, questioning Dugan's mental health. Three years later, in 1869, Pius IX sent Duggan to a sanitarium in St. Louis and appointed Monsignor Thomas Foley as coadjutor bishop to operate the diocese. In 1870, a Jesuit educator, Arnold Damen, established St. Ignatius College in Chicago.

In October 1871, the diocese suffered nearly a million dollars in property damage in the Great Chicago Fire, including the destruction of St. Mary's Cathedral. In 1875, Foley dedicated the new Cathedral of the Holy Name in Chicago, designed by architect Patrick Keely. Foley invited the Franciscans, Vincentians, Servites, Viatorians, and Resurrectionist religious orders to establish parishes and schools in the diocese. In 1876, disagreements between Foley and Mother Mary Alfred Moes of the Sisters of St. Francis of Mary Immaculate of Joliet led her to relocate her order to Minnesota.

In 1877, the Vatican erected the Diocese of Peoria, taking several counties in Central Illinois from the Diocese of Chicago. Foley died in 1879,

=== 1880 to 1900 ===
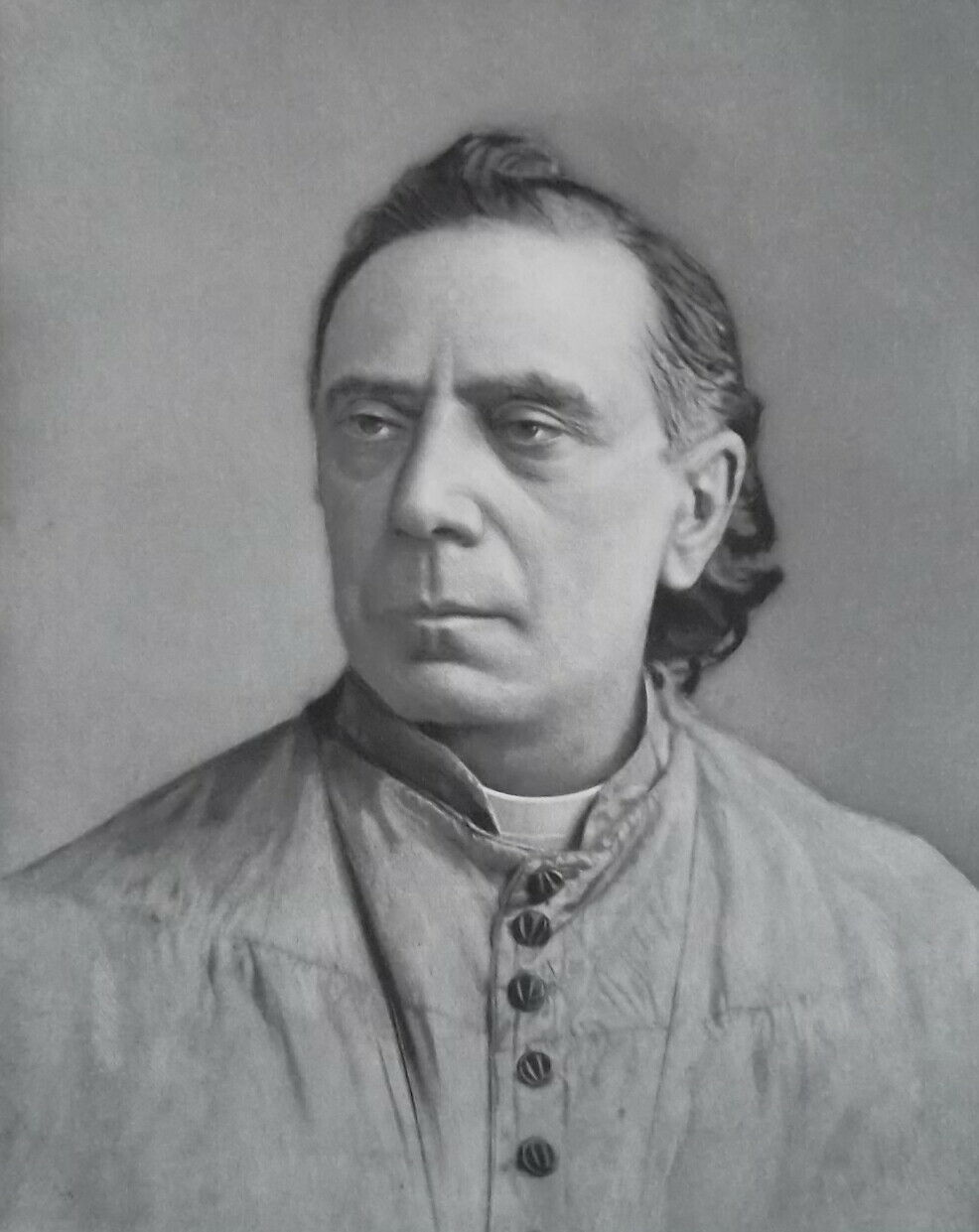
Archbishop Feehan (1889)

In 1880, the Vatican elevated the Diocese of Chicago to the Archdiocese of Chicago making it the metropolitan see for all of Illinois. At that time, it transferred five more counties to the suffragan Diocese of Peoria. Pope Leo XIII named Bishop Patrick Feehan from the Diocese of Nashville as the first archbishop.

From 1880 to 1902, the Catholic population of Chicago nearly quadrupled to 800,000, mainly due to immigration. While the existing Irish and German communities expanded, Polish, Bohemian, French-Canadian, Lithuanian, Italian, Croatian, Slovak and Dutch Catholics arrived in the archdiocese, bringing their own languages and cultural traditions.

During his tenure as archbishop, Feehan founded 140 new parishes. Fifty-two of them were national parishes serving particular ethnic communities, staffed by religious orders from their home countries. The parishes provided the new immigrants with familiar fraternal organizations, music, and language, safe from xenophobia and anti-Catholic discrimination.

In 1881, Feehan established the St. Vincent Orphan Asylum and in 1883 the St. Mary's Training School for Boys. They were followed in 1887 with the founding of St. Paul's Home for Working Boys. A strong supporter of Catholic education, Feehan promoted it with an exhibition at the 1893 World's Columbian Exposition in Chicago "Archbishop Feehan believed a strong system of Catholic education would solve the problem of inconsistent religious instruction at home, and unify a rapidly diversifying Catholic America." He also brought the Vincentians to Chicago to start what is now DePaul University.

=== 1900 to 1930 ===
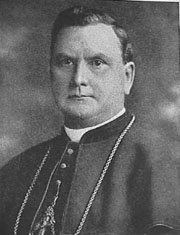
Archbishop Quigley (1896)

After Feehan died in 1902, Leo XIII in 1903 named Bishop James Quigley from the Diocese of Buffalo as the next archbishop of Chicago. In 1905, Quigley asked John De Schryver, a professor at St. Ignatius College Prep in Chicago, to organize St. John Berchmans Parish for Belgian Catholics. Quigley also established parishes for Italian and Lithuanian immigrants. "Chicago's urban parishes flourished as an important spiritual, cultural, and educational component of Chicago's life."

Pope Pius X erected the Diocese of Rockford in 1907, with 12 counties transferred from the Archdiocese of Chicago. In 1910, Quigley approached Francis X. McCabe, president of DePaul University, about the lack of higher education opportunities for Catholic women in the archdiocese. DePaul began admitting women the following year. Quigley died in 1915.

The next archbishop of Chicago was Auxiliary Bishop George Mundelein from the Diocese of Brooklyn, appointed by Pope Benedict XV on December 9, 1915. Almost half the Chicago population was Catholic by the 1920s. For decades, the parishes had been building and running their own schools, employing religious sisters as inexpensive teachers. The languages of instruction were often German or Polish. On taking office, Mundelein centralized control of the parish schools. The archdiocesan building committee now picked the locations for new schools while its school board standardized the school curricula, textbooks, teacher training, testing, and educational policies.

In 1926, the archdiocese hosted the 28th International Eucharistic Congress.

=== 1930 to 1960 ===
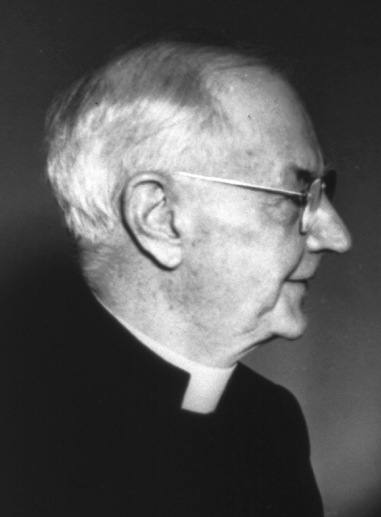
Cardinal Stritch (pre-1958)

Mundelein died in 1939. To replace him, Pope Pius XII named Archbishop Samuel Stritch from the Archdiocese of Milwaukee. After Stritch died in May 1958, Pius Xll appointed Archbishop Albert Meyer of Milwaukee as archbishop of Chicago on September 19, 1958. Pius XII erected the Diocese of Joliet in 1948, taking four counties from the Archdiocese of Chicago along with counties from the Dioceses of Rockford and Peoria. This created the current territory of the archdiocese.

On December 1, 1958, a fire at Our Lady of the Angels School in Chicago destroyed part of the school and killed 92 students and three nuns. While visiting survivors in the hospital and viewing the deceased in the city morgue, Meyer was overcome with grief. In 1959, the National Fire Protection Association report on the fire criticized the archdiocese for "housing their children in fire traps". The report noted that the archdiocese continued to operate schools with inadequate fire safety standards. The archdiocese faced $44 million in lawsuits from the families of fire victims and survivors. After six years of negotiations, Meyer agreed to a financial settlement with the victims and survivors.

=== 1960 to 1980 ===
In 1960, Meyer banned parishes from hosting bingo games in response to reports of corruption. In January 1961, during riots in the African-American Bronzeville neighborhood of Chicago, Meyer made this statement:

We must remove from the church on the local scene any possible taint of racial discrimination or racial segregation, and help provide the moral leadership for eliminating racial discrimination from the whole community.

After Meyer died in 1965. Pope Paul VI appointed Archbishop John Cody from the Archdiocese of New Orleans as the next archbishop of Chicago. During his tenure in Chicago, many priests and lay people criticized Cody for an autocratic management style. The Association of Chicago Priests censured Meyer in 1971 for failing to advance the Second Vatican Council reforms in the archdiocese. Cody closed 27 schools as well as several parishes in inner city Chicago.

=== 1980 to 1990 ===
In September 1981, the US Attorney's Office in Chicago announced an investigation of Cody over the diversion of over $1 million archdiocesan funds to Helen Dolan Wilson, whom Cody described as his step-cousin. That same week, the Chicago Sun-Times revealed that Wilson was on the archdiocesan payroll, but had no discernable duties. Cody denied all charges of wrongdoing. When Cody died in 1982, the official investigation was terminated.

Pope John Paul II in 1982 chose Archbishop Joseph Bernardin of the Archdiocese of Cincinnati as Cody's replacement. Bernardin found an archdiocese in disarray, its priests disheartened by arbitrary administration and charges of financial misconduct under Cody. "With his patient charm and willingness to listen, Bernardin won back the confidence of the clergy and the laity." Within a few months of his arrival in Chicago, Bernadin had spoken personally to every priest in the archdiocese. He also prepared and released an audit of the archdiocesan finances.

During the 1983 mayoral election campaign in Chicago, the African-American Congressman Harold Washington faced bitter opposition from the Chicago political machine. Bernadin urged Chicago Catholics to reject racist attacks against Washington; when he was elected, Bernadin met with Washington the day after the election.

In 1984, Bernadin began the Council of Religious Leaders of Metropolitan Chicago, the successor group to the Chicago Conference on Religion and Race. The archdiocese also established covenants with the Episcopal Diocese of Chicago in 1986 and with the Metropolitan Synod of the Evangelical Lutheran Church in America in 1989.

=== 1990 to 2020 ===
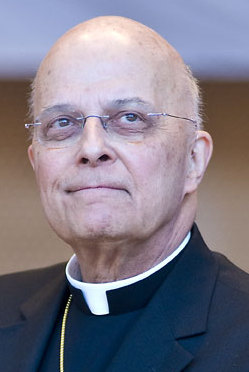
Cardinal George (2011)

In 1990, Bernadin announced that the archdiocese was closing 37 churches and schools. After Bernadin died in 1996, John Paul II appointed Archbishop Francis George from the Archdiocese of Portland in Oregon as the eighth archbishop of Chicago, George was the first native Chicagoan to become its archbishop.

In 2011, George terminated the foster care program of Catholic Charities in the archdiocese. The State of Illinois had ruled that it would not fund any charities that refused to consider same-sex couples as foster care providers or adoptive parents. George refused to comply with this requirement.

In 2011, the City of Chicago proposed a new route for the June 2012 Chicago Pride Parade, a celebration by the LGBTQ community. However, the archdiocese objected to the new route, saying the parade would pass by Our Lady of Mount Carmel Church during Sunday morning mass. George told an interviewer: "you don't want the Gay Liberation Movement to morph into something like the Ku Klux Klan, demonstrating in the streets against Catholicism." In response, LGBTQ advocates called for George's resignation, but George said:

"When the pastor's request for reconsideration of the plans was ignored, the organizers invited an obvious comparison to other groups who have historically attempted to stifle the religious freedom of the Catholic Church."

City administrators negotiated a compromise plan that delayed the parade start by two hours, allowing it to pass by Our Lady after its mass concluded. Two weeks later, George apologized for his remarks. George died in 2014.

Pope Francis named Bishop Blaise Cupich from the Diocese of Spokane as the next archbishop of Chicago. Cupich announced a major reorganization of the archdiocese in 2015. Approximately 50 archdiocesan employees accepted early retirement packages offered by the archdiocese. In 2016, increasing costs, low attendance at mass and priest shortages prompted the archdiocese to close or consolidate up to 100 parishes and schools over the next 15 years.

=== 2020 to present ===
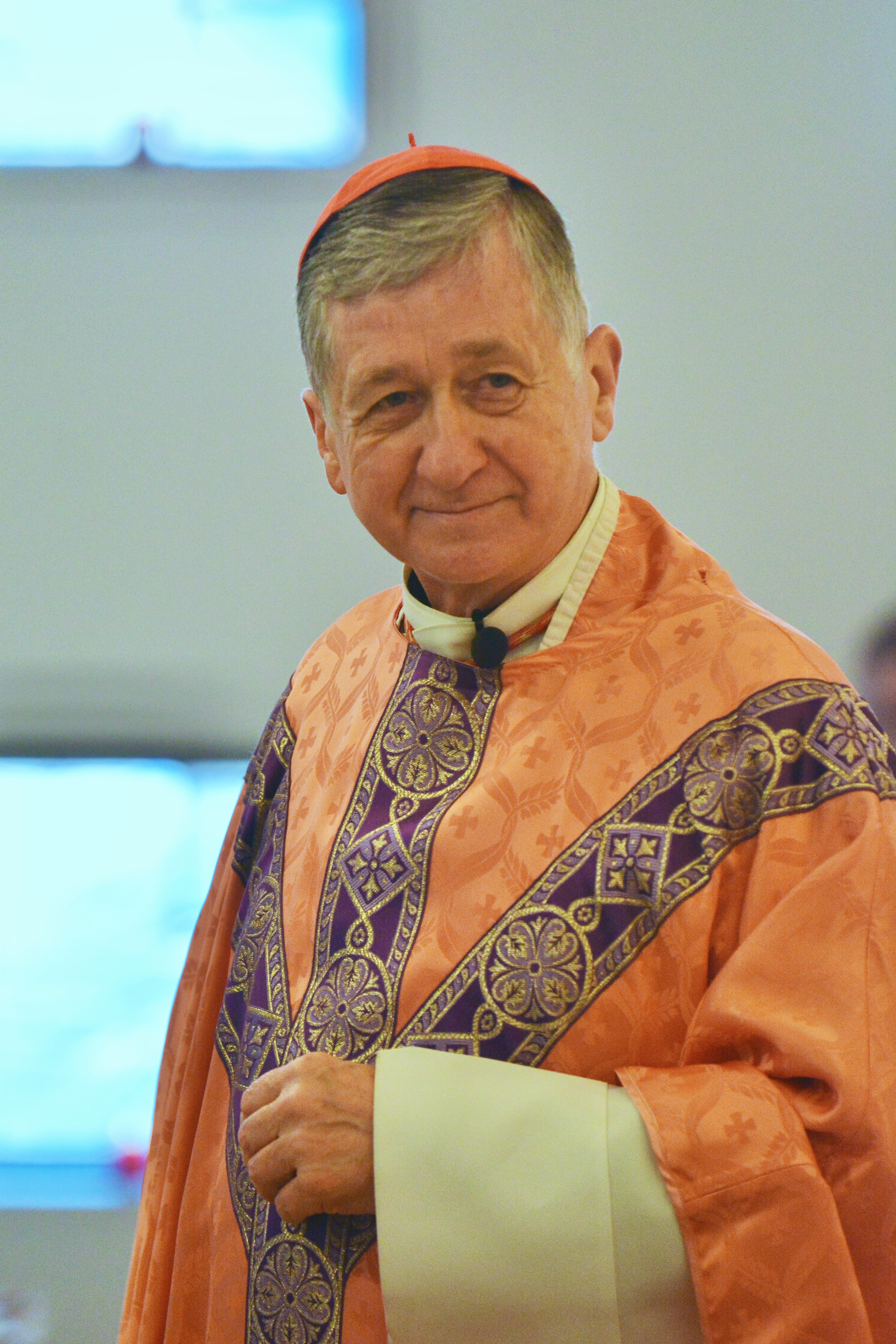
Cardinal Cupich (2021)

On December 27, 2021, following the issuing of the motu proprio Traditionis custodes in July and the subsequent issuing of guidelines released by the Congregation for Divine Worship and the Discipline of the Sacraments in December, Cupich imposed restrictions on the celebration of the traditional Latin mass in the archdiocese. He banned the usage of the Traditional Rite on the first Sunday of every month, Christmas, the Triduum, Easter Sunday, and Pentecost Sunday. In 2021, the archdiocese announced plans to combine 13 parishes into five clusters, to minister to regions south of Chicago.

On August 1, 2022, the Institute of Christ the King Sovereign Priest (ICKSP) announced the celebration of public masses and sacraments at Shrine of Christ the King Church, its headquarters in Chicago. The archdiocese had sent the ICKSP in 2021 its new regulations on the use of the traditional Latin Mass.

As of 2026, 39 churches in Chicago and 24 in the surrounding suburbs have closed and the number of parishes has reduced from 344 to 216.

On May 8, 2025, Robert Francis Prevost, who was born and raised in Chicago and educated at schools run by the Archdiocese of Chicago, would become the first U.S. Pope, taking the name Pope Leo XIV.

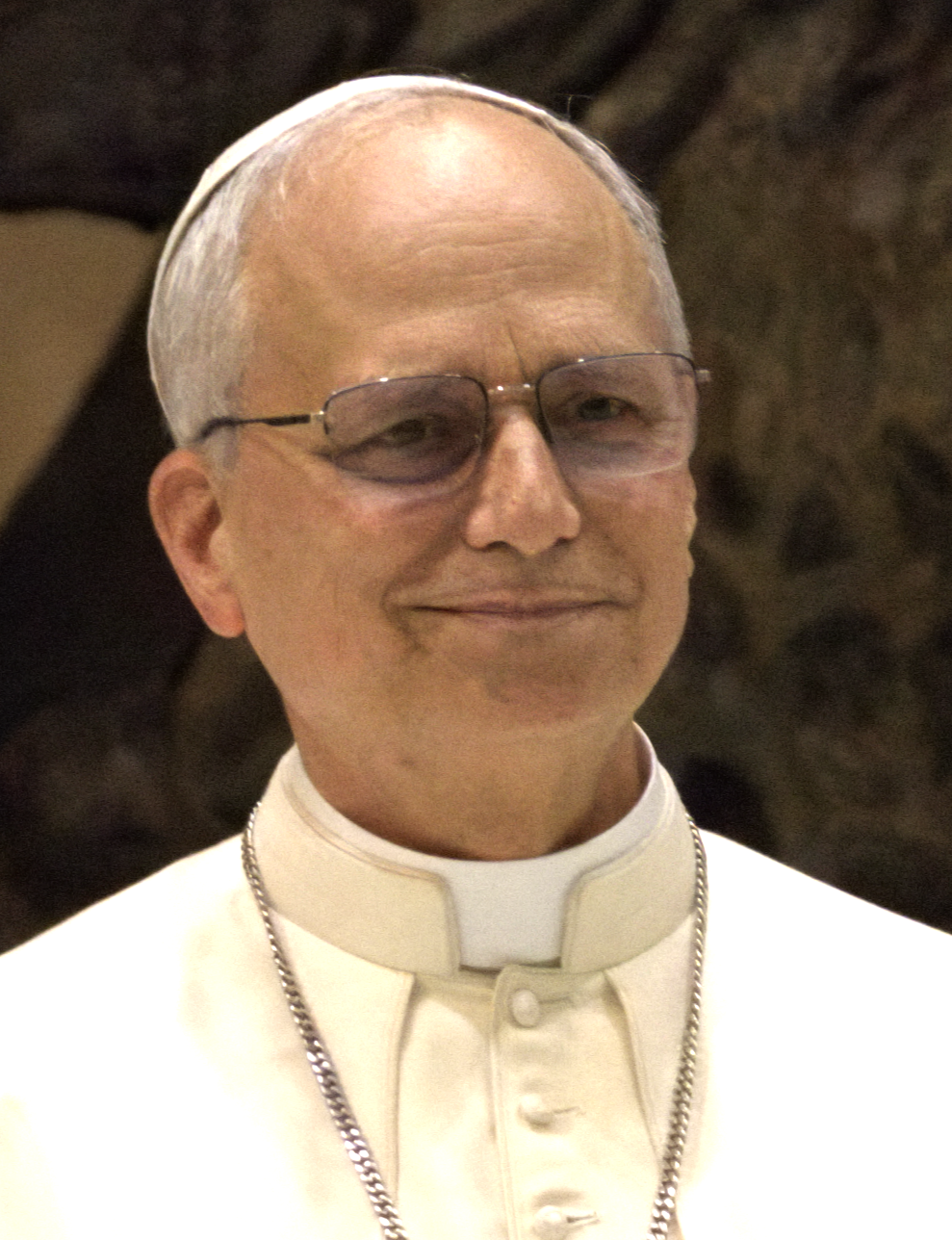
Pope Leo XIV from the Archdiocese of Chicago

== Churches ==
In the 1950s, Chicago-area Catholics spoke of which churches they attended and identified themselves via these churches. University of Notre Dame professor Kathleen Sprows Cummings stated that knowing one's church revealed demographic information and that it "was an identifier, almost more identifiable than the particular neighborhood that they lived in."

== Archbishop's residence ==
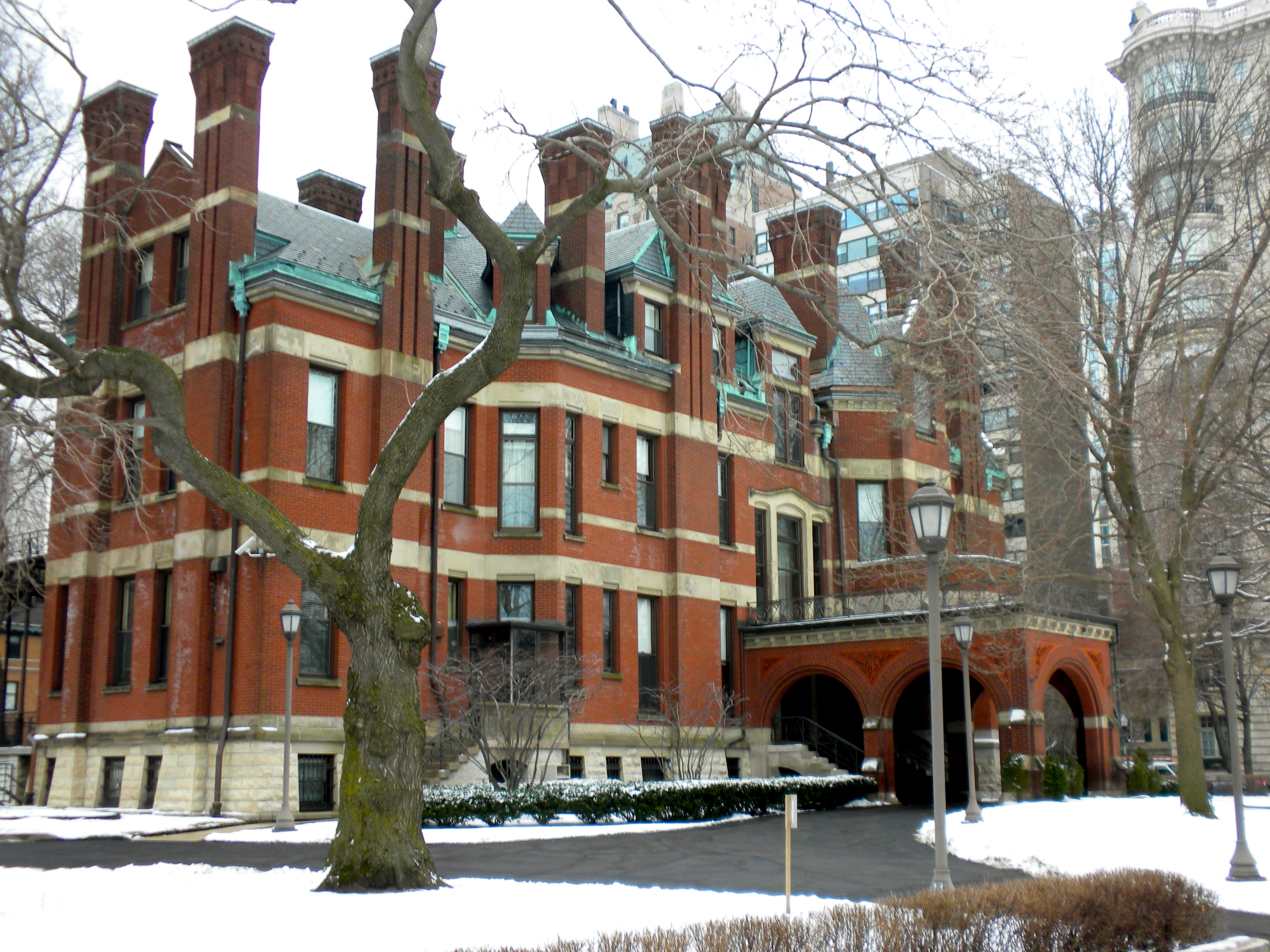
Former archbishop's residence, Chicago (now used as a guesthouse)

The archbishop's residence in Chicago is a private guesthouse owned by the Archdiocese of Chicago. It served as the official residence of the archbishops until 2014, when incoming Archbishop Blaise Cupich decided to live in the rectory of Holy Name Cathedral.

Listed on the National Register of Historic Places, the archbishop's residence was built in 1885 by Bishop Feehan. A three-story, red brick building, it is one of the oldest structures in the Astor Street District, according to the Landmarks Preservation Council. Before its construction, the bishops of Chicago resided at a home on LaSalle Street and North Avenue. When John Paul II visited Chicago in 1979, he became the first pontiff to stay at the residence. However, both Pius XII and Paul VI resided there during their visits to Chicago as cardinals.

== Bishops ==
Since 1915, the Vatican has designated each archbishop of Chicago as a cardinal priest, with membership in the College of Cardinals. As such, they also have responsibilities in the dicasteries of the Roman Curia.

- All but two of the bishops and archbishops of Chicago previously served as diocesan priests.
- Bishop Van de Velde belonged to the Society of Jesus and Archbishop George was a member of the Missionary Oblates of Mary Immaculate.

=== Bishops of Chicago ===
1. William J. Quarter (1843–1848)
2. James Oliver Van de Velde (1849–1853), appointed Bishop of Natchez
3. Anthony O'Regan (1854–1858)
4. James Duggan (1859–1880)

=== Archbishops of Chicago ===
1. Patrick Augustine Feehan (1880–1902)
2. James Edward Quigley (1903–1915)
3. Cardinal George Mundelein (1915–1939)
4. Cardinal Samuel Stritch (1940–1958), appointed Pro-Prefect of the Sacred Congregation for the Propagation of the Faith
5. Cardinal Albert Gregory Meyer (1958–1965)
6. Cardinal John Cody (1965–1982)
7. Cardinal Joseph Bernardin (1982–1996)
8. Cardinal Francis George (1997–2014)
9. Cardinal Blase J. Cupich (2014–present)

=== Current auxiliary bishops ===
- Mark Andrew Bartosic (2018–present)
- Robert J. Lombardo (2020–present)
- Timothy J. O'Malley (2025–present)
- Lawrence J. Sullivan (2025–present)
- José Maria Garcia Maldonado (2025–present)
- Robert Fedek (2025–present)
- John S. Siemianowski (2025–present)

=== Former auxiliary bishops ===
- Alexander Joseph McGavick (1899–1921), appointed Bishop of La Crosse
- Peter Muldoon (1901–1908), appointed Bishop of Rockford
- Paul Peter Rhode (1908–1915), appointed Bishop of Green Bay
- Edward Francis Hoban (1921–1928), appointed Bishop of Rockford and later Bishop of Cleveland
- Bernard James Sheil (1928–1969), appointed Archbishop ad personam in 1959
- William David O'Brien (1934–1962)
- William Edward Cousins (1949–1952), appointed Bishop of Peoria and later Archbishop of Milwaukee
- Raymond Peter Hillinger (1956–1971), appointed Bishop of Rockford
- Cletus F. O'Donnell (1960–1967), appointed Bishop of Madison
- Aloysius John Wycislo (1960–1968), appointed Bishop of Green Bay
- John L. May (1967–1969), appointed Bishop of Mobile and later Archbishop of St. Louis
- Thomas Joseph Grady (1967–1974), appointed Bishop of Orlando
- William Edward McManus (1967–1976), appointed Bishop of Fort Wayne-South Bend
- Michael Dempsey (1968–1974)
- Alfred Leo Abramowicz (1968–1995)
- Nevin William Hayes (1971–1988)
- John George Vlazny (1983–1987). appointed Bishop of Winona and later Archbishop of Portland in Oregon
- Plácido Rodriguez (1983–1994), appointed Bishop of Lubbock
- Wilton D. Gregory (1983–1994), appointed Bishop of Belleville and later Archbishop of Atlanta and Archbishop of Washington
- Timothy Joseph Lyne (1983–1995)
- John R. Gorman (1988–2003)
- Thad J. Jakubowski (1988–2003)
- Raymond E. Goedert (1991–2003)
- Gerald Frederick Kicanas (1995–2002), appointed Bishop of Tucson
- Edwin Michael Conway (1995–2004)
- George V. Murry (1995–1998), appointed Coadjutor Bishop of St. Thomas and subsequently succeeded to that see
- John R. Manz (1996–2021)
- Joseph N. Perry (1998–2023)
- Jerome Edward Listecki (2001–2005), appointed Bishop of La Crosse and later Archbishop of Milwaukee
- Thomas J. Paprocki (2003–2010), appointed Bishop of Springfield in Illinois
- Francis J. Kane (2003–2018)
- George J. Rassas (2006–2018)
- Alberto Rojas (2011–2019), appointed Coadjutor Bishop of San Bernardino and later succeeded as bishop
- Andrew Peter Wypych (2011–2023)
- Robert Gerald Casey (2018–2025), appointed Archbishop of Cincinnati
- Ronald Aldon Hicks (2018–2020), appointed Bishop of Joliet and later Archbishop of New York
- Kevin M. Birmingham (2020–2023)
- Jeffrey S. Grob (2020–2025), appointed Archbishop of Milwaukee

=== Other archdiocesan priests who became bishops ===
- Peter Joseph Baltes, appointed Bishop of Alton in 1869
- John McMullen, appointed Bishop of Davenport in 1881
- Maurice Francis Burke, appointed Bishop of Cheyenne in 1887
- Edward Joseph Dunne, appointed Bishop of Dallas in 1893
- Thaddeus Joseph Butler, appointed Bishop of Concordia in 1897 (died before his consecration)
- Edmund Michael Dunne, appointed Bishop of Peoria in 1909
- Stanislaus Vincent Bona, appointed Bishop of Grand Island in 1931
- Moses Elias Kiley, appointed Bishop of Trenton in 1934
- Francis Joseph Magner, appointed Bishop of Marquette in 1940
- Patrick Thomas Brennan,(priest here, 1928–1936), appointed Prefect of Kwoszu, Korea (South) in 1948
- Martin Dewey McNamara, appointed Bishop of Joliet in Illinois in 1948
- William Aloysius O'Connor, appointed Bishop of Springfield in Illinois in 1948
- Donald Martin Carroll, appointed Bishop of Rockford in 1956 (did not take effect)
- Ernest John Primeau, appointed Bishop of Manchester in 1959
- Romeo Roy Blanchette, appointed Auxiliary Bishop of Joliet in Illinois in 1965
- Raymond James Vonesh, appointed Auxiliary Bishop of Joliet in Illinois in 1968
- Paul Casimir Marcinkus, appointed titular Archbishop in 1968
- Thomas Joseph Murphy, appointed Bishop of Great Falls in 1978
- John Richard Keating, appointed Bishop of Arlington in 1983
- James Patrick Keleher, appointed Bishop of Belleville in 1984
- Edward Michael Egan, appointed Auxiliary Bishop of New York in 1985; future Cardinal
- Edward James Slattery, appointed Bishop of Tulsa in 1993
- Edward Kenneth Braxton, appointed Auxiliary Bishop of St. Louis in 1995
- Robert Emmet Barron, appointed Auxiliary Bishop of Los Angeles in 2015; appointed bishop of Winona-Rochester in 2022
- Michael George McGovern, appointed Bishop of Belleville in 2020 and later Archbishop of Omaha in 2025
- Louis Tylka, appointed Coadjutor Bishop of Peoria in 2020 and subsequently succeeded to that see

== Structure of the archdiocese ==
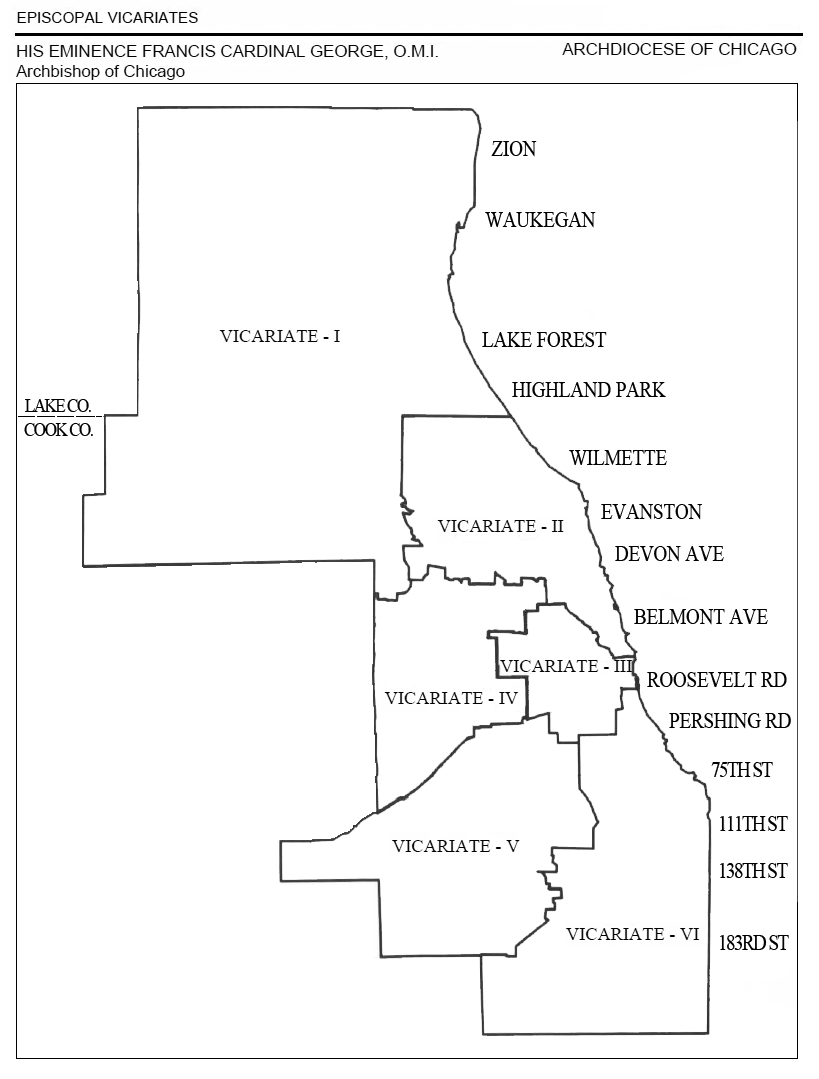
Map of vicariates in the Archdiocese of Chicago in Cook County and Lake County, Illinois

=== Office of Catholic Schools ===
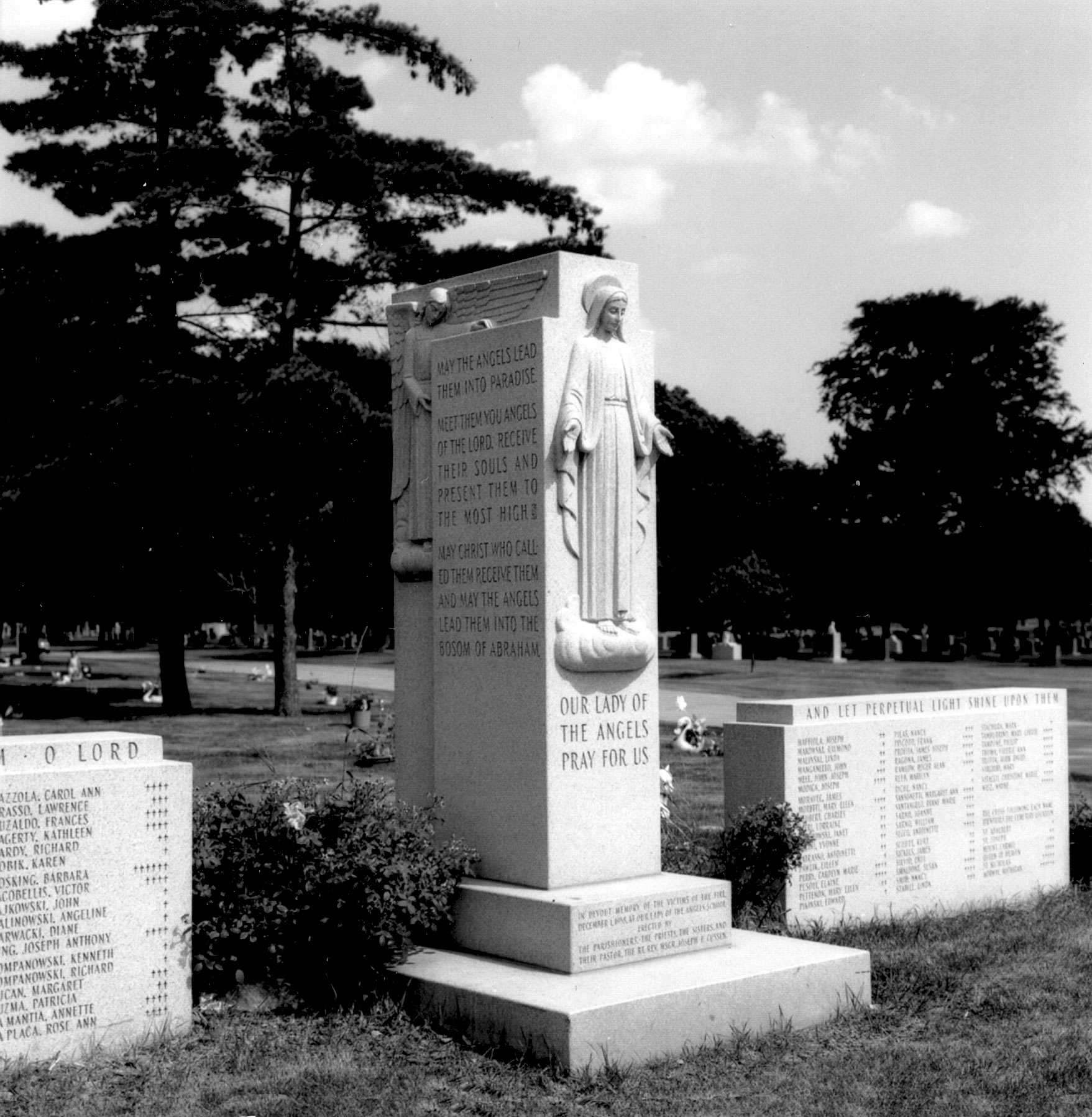
Monument to victims of the 1958 Our Lady of the Angels School Fire at Queen of Heaven Cemetery

The Office of Catholic Schools operates a system of primary and secondary schools in the archdiocese. A 2015 article in the Chicago Tribune described the archdiocesan schools as the largest private school system in the United States.

The first school in the archdiocese was a boys' school, opened in Chicago in 1844. During the 19th and early 20th centuries, the archdiocese established schools serving Germans, Poles, Czechs, Bohemians, French, Slovaks, Lithuanians, Puerto Rican Americans, African Americans, Italians, and Mexicans. Many of these schools were founded by religious sisters. The school construction boom in the archdiocese ended when Cardinal Cody froze school construction in Lake County and suburban Cook County.

Between 1984 and 2004, the archdiocese closed 148 schools and 10 school sites. By 2005, over half of its urban schools had closed. In January 2018, the archdiocese announced the closure of five school and In January 2020 it closed five more schools. As of 2022, the archdiocese contained 33 secondary schools; seven were all-girls. seven were all-boys and 19 were co-ed The system had an enrollment of 44,460 students in its primary schools and 19,200 in its secondary schools.

=== Respect Life Office ===
Cardinal George established the Respect Life Office in the archdiocese. It provides educational resources and a speakers bureau, and sponsors conferences, retreats and rallies. The Office runs Project Rachel Post Abortion Healing, a program for women who have abortion procedures; and the Chastity Education Initiative, which advises youth and young adults on sexuality issues.

The office has coordinated the local 40 Days for Life campaign and trips to the March for Life rallies in both Chicago and Washington, DC, for college and high school students.

== Seminary ==
- University of Saint Mary of the Lake (Mundelein Seminary) – major seminary

== Province of Chicago ==
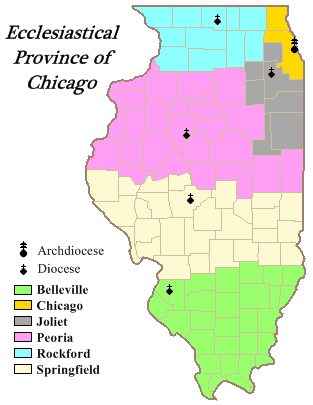
Province of Chicago

- Diocese of Belleville
- Diocese of Joliet in Illinois
- Diocese of Peoria
- Diocese of Rockford
- Diocese of Springfield in Illinois
