= St. Joseph College Seminary (Illinois) =

Coordinates: 42°0′6.5″N 87°39′34.3″W

Saint Joseph College Seminary
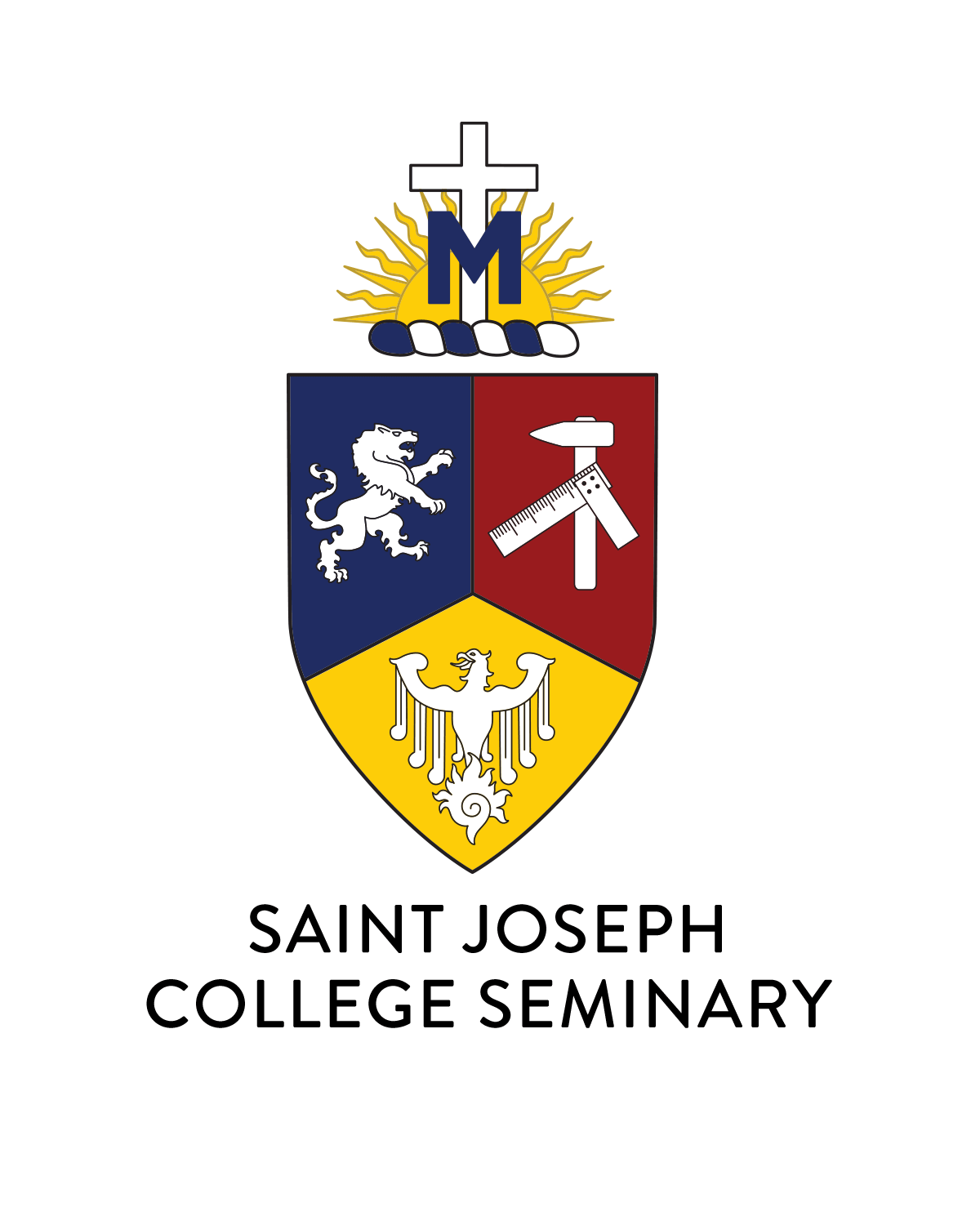

Location
- 1120 W Loyola Ave; Chicago, Illinois; United States

Information
- School type: College Seminary
- Denomination: Roman Catholic
- Patron saint: Saint Joseph
- Established: 1964 (as Saint Mary's College)
- Founder: John Cody
- Closed: 2019
- Oversight: Archdiocese of Chicago
- Campus type: Urban
- Colors: Navy Blue; Yellow; Red

St. Joseph College Seminary was a college of Loyola University Chicago and the college seminary of the Archdiocese of Chicago. It later became a residence hall for Loyola.

== History ==
Saint Joseph College Seminary opened as Saint Mary's College in Niles, Illinois in 1964 and became known as the Niles College Seminary.

In 1994, the Niles campus was sold and the seminary moved to Loyola University where the seminary was renamed St. Joseph College Seminary in honor of Cardinal Joseph Bernardin.

In the Archdiocesan Chicago Seminary system, Saint Joseph College Seminary trained college-aged men for the Catholic priesthood. The Archdiocese of Chicago Seminary System also included the Archbishop Quigley Scholars Program, an outreach program for high school students, and the University of Saint Mary of the Lake incorporating the Cardinal Mundelein Seminary, a major seminary for graduate-level theology studies.

In January 2019, Cardinal Blase J. Cupich of the Archdiocese announced that the seminary would close in June 2019. The seminary building was sold to Loyola University Chicago and now serves as one of the university's residence halls.
