= University of Saint Mary of the Lake =

Catholic seminary in Mundelein, Illinois, US

- Former names: St. Mary's College; St. Mary of the Lake Seminary
- Type: Private seminary
- Established: 1844; 182 years ago
- Affiliations: Association of Theological Schools (ATS); Association of Chicago Theological Schools (ACTS)
- Religious affiliation: Catholic Church
- Chancellor: Blase J. Cupich
- Rector: John Kartje
- Faculty: 32 (full time); 6 (part time)
- Postgraduates: 202 (fall 2019)
- Other students: 400 (special programs)
- Location: 1000 E Maple Ave, Mundelein, IL, 60060-1174; 42°16′54″N 88°00′01″W
- Campus: Suburban, 600 acres (242.8 ha)
- Vice Rector: Edward Pelrine
- Nickname: Lakers
- Website: www.usml.edu

The University of Saint Mary of the Lake (USML) is a private Catholic seminary in Mundelein, Illinois. It is the principal seminary and school of theology for the formation of priests in the Archdiocese of Chicago in Illinois. USML was chartered by the Illinois General Assembly in 1844. USML is often referred to by the name of its graduate program, Mundelein Seminary. Its compound name is University of Saint Mary of the Lake/Mundelein Seminary.

In addition to Mundelein Seminary, USML offers the School of Parish Leadership & Evangelization (SPLE) and the Pontifical Faculty of Theology. USML is the sponsor of Chicago Studies, an academic journal for priests and others in parish ministry.

The USML sports teams are known as the Lakers.

== History ==
=== First University of Saint Mary of the Lake ===
When William Quarter arrived in Chicago, Illinois, in 1844 to serve as the first bishop of the Diocese of Chicago, he obtained in December of that year a state charter to establish the University of Saint Mary of the Lake. His priority was to educate more native-born seminarians to become priests. After obtaining the charter, he raised $3,000 during a trip to the East Coast for the college. Construction was started in October 1845 and completed in July 1846.

During the later 1840s and early 1850s, James Oliver Van de Velde had frequent conflicts with the university administrators, all of whom came from Holy Name Parish in Chicago. In 1852, Van de Veldt offered administration of Saint Mary to the Fathers of the Holy Cross at the University of Notre Dame. The order declined the offer until 1856, when Bishop Anthony O'Regan persuaded them to take over the university.

The university had grown to 35 students by 1857 and 120 by 1859. However, the university struggled financially and the Fathers of the Holy Cross left in 1861. In 1863, Chicago bishop James Duggan laid the foundation for a new building at the university. The diocese also established schools of medicine and law at the institution. However, the university suddenly closed in 1866 due to its financial problems. The seminary remained open there until 1868. The campus was then converted into an orphanage. The facility was destroyed during the 1871 Chicago Fire.

=== Saint Mary of the Lake Seminary ===
In 1921, Bishop George Mundelein opened Saint Mary of the Lake Seminary, using the 1844 state charter of the previous University of Saint Mary of the Lake. The new facility was sited in what is today Mundelein, Illinois. Like Bishop Quarter in 1844, Mundelein wanted to prepare American seminarians from all different ethnic groups to become priests. In 1926, the archdiocese opened the Chapel of the Immaculate Conception on the seminary campus, designed by Chicago architect Joseph W. McCarthy. In 1926, the seminary hosted the 28th International Eucharistic Congress.

In September 1929, the Sacred Congregation for Seminaries and Universities in Rome granted a charter to Saint Mary, allowing it to grant pontifical academic degrees. In 1934, this authority became permanent. Saint Mary became the first pontifical university in the United States. Monsignor Reynold Henry Hillenbrand served as rector of Saint Mary from 1936 to 1944.

=== Niles College/Mundelein Seminary/Saint Mary ===
In 1961, Cardinal Albert Meyer split up the seminary programs for the archdiocese:

- Niles College was established in Niles, Illinois as a two-year liberal arts program for seminarians.
- Mundelein Seminary was created on the Saint Mary Campus in Mundelein, Illinois. It provided second and third year college classes in philosophy for seminarians, followed by a four-year theology curriculum.

Cardinal John Cody transferred the undergraduate programs of both Niles and Mundelein to Loyola University of Chicago. They became part of the new Niles College of Loyola University. Cody designated Saint Mary (Mundelein) as a graduate school of theology. In 1971, Saint Mary affiliated with the Association of Theological Schools. Cody appointed Thomas J. Murphy as the fifth rector of Saint Mary on September 15, 1973.

In 1976, Saint Mary inaugurated a Doctor of Ministry degree and celebrated the 50th anniversary of its first ordinations. Cardinal Joseph Bernardin later revised the graduate program at Saint Mary to bring it in compliance with the Program of Priestly Formation, written by the US Conference of Catholic Bishops. In 1986, Bernardin opened the Center for Development in Ministry at Saint Mary. The new center provided continuing education for clergy, religious and laity.

=== Second University of Saint Mary of the Lake ===
In 1986, Saint Mary of the Lake Seminary returned to its original name of the University of Saint Mary of the Lake (USML). The archdiocese officially renamed the USML graduate school as Mundelein Seminary. In 1996, Mundelein Seminary was visited by members of the Bishops' Committee on Seminaries. After meeting with faculty and students, the committee sent the US Conference of Catholic Bishops a positive report on the Mundelein program.

Cardinal Francis George in February 2000 transferred the following three archdiocesan programs of ministry formation to Mundelein Seminary:

- Lay Ministry Formation Program
- Diaconate Formation Program
- Instituto de Liderazgo Pastoral (Pastoral Leadership Institute)

The archdiocese transferred the Center for Development in Ministry to the archdiocesan Pastoral Center. Mundelein Seminary now became the center for the formation of priests, deacons and lay people.

In 2023, USML established the School of Parish Leadership and Evangelization. This school took over the functions of the Institute of Diaconal Studies, the Instituto de Liderazgo Pastoral, the Liturgical Institute, and the Institute of Pastoral Leadership.

=== University of Saint Mary of the Lake/Mundelein Seminary ===
The board of advisors in 2000 decided to rename the institution as the University of Saint Mary of the Lake / Mundelein Seminary. This follows the style of most pontifical universities, which have a formal name and a common name. Also in 2000, Cardinal George established the Liturgical Institute at USML

In 2007, USML published The Mundelein Psalter. It is the first complete one-volume edition containing the approved English-language texts of the Liturgy of the Hours, with psalms that are pointed for the chanting of the Divine Office.

Monsignor Dennis J. Lyle was succeeded on July 1, 2012, as rector and president of USML by Robert Barron. Thomas A. Baima was named the vice-rector for academic affairs. On September 22, 2012, Sara Butler, a USML professor and a member of the International Theological Commission, became a papally-appointed expert at the 13th Ordinary General Assembly of the Synod of Bishops on the New Evangelization. On December 3, 2012, Elizabeth Nagel was appointed to succeed John G. Lodge as president of the Pontifical Faculty of Theology.

In 2021, USML celebrated its centennial. Approximately 116 seminarians from 24 dioceses were enrolled that year, despite the COVID-19 pandemic. In 2022, USML received a grant from the Lilly Endowment to help fund development of a project to integrate new pedagogical methods into formation programs for seminarians, priests and lay leaders. USML received another grant from the endowment in April 2024 for $1.25 million to assist the School of Parish Leadership & Evangelization.

== Campus ==
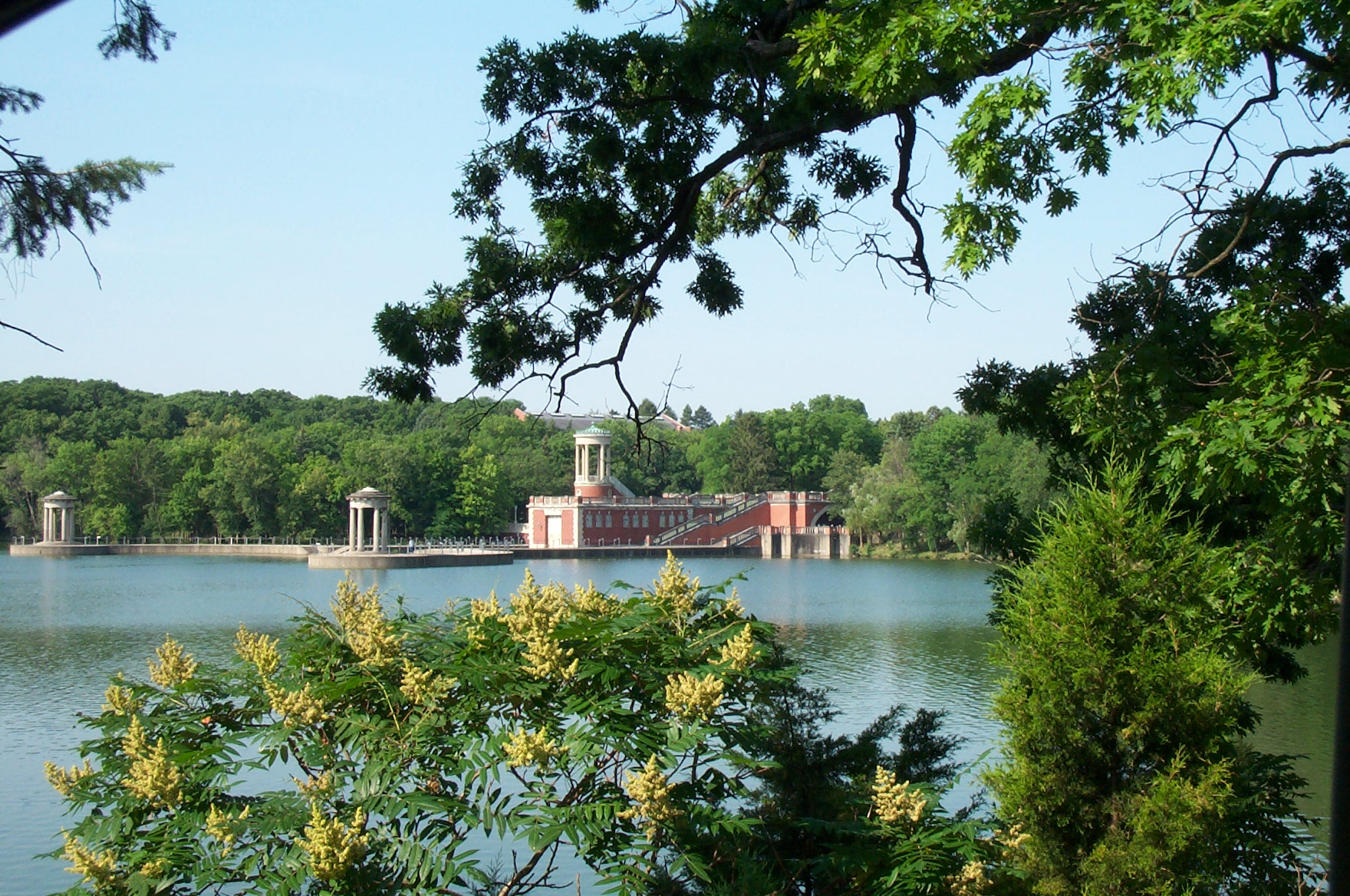
View of USML boat house from across the lake

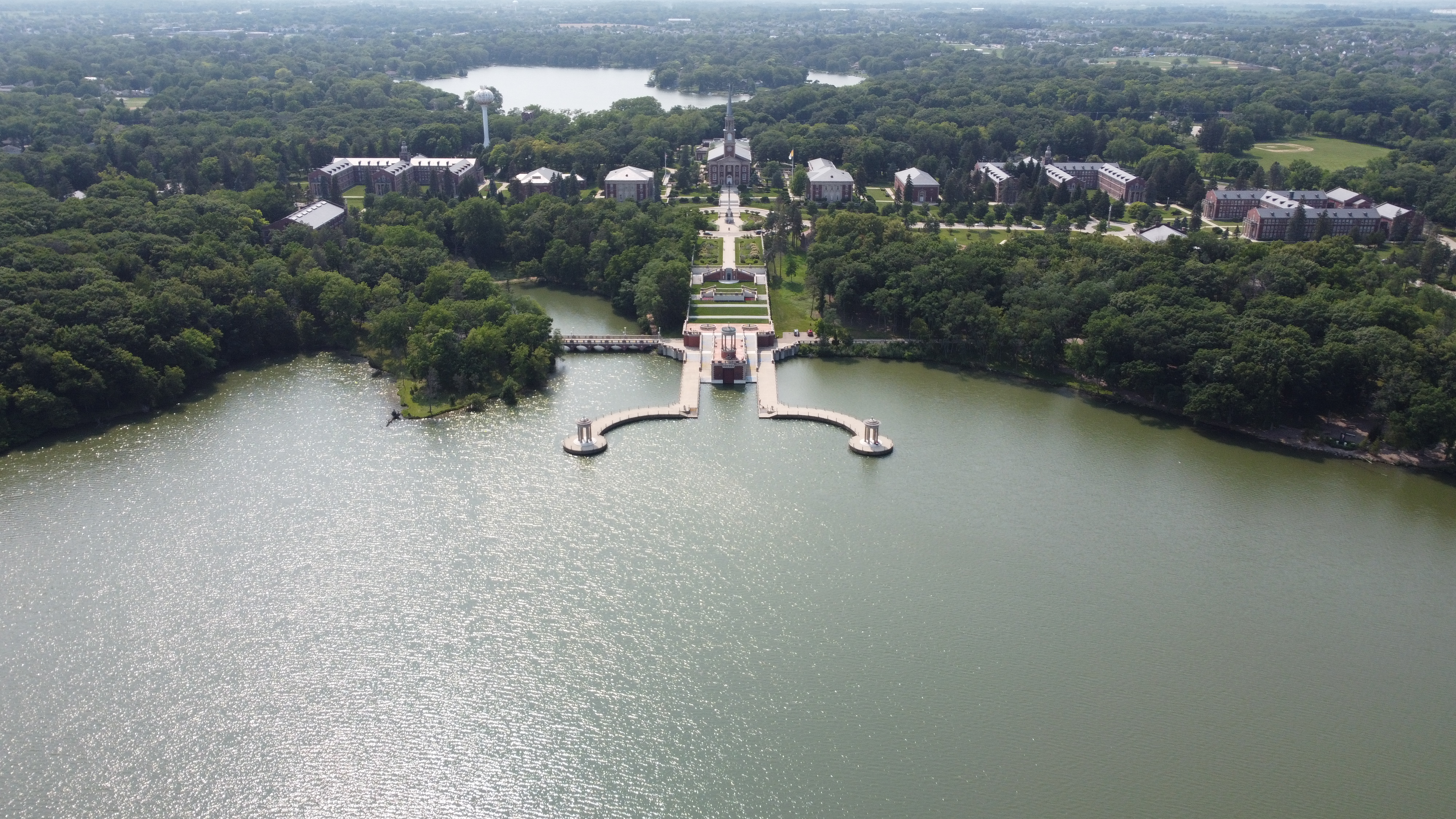
Aerial view of USML

USML is located in Mundelein, Illinois on Saint Mary's Lake on 600 acres (242.8 ha). USML has a capacity for about 400 students. The campus is centered upon the Chapel of the Immaculate Conception. The chapel is dedicated to Mary, mother of Jesus, under the title of her Immaculate Conception, the patroness of the seminary.

The George Cardinal Mundelein Auditorium at USML houses the Gottfried-Wurlitzer theatre pipe organ. The organ was built in 1929 for Chicago radio organist Al Carney. Cardinal Mundelein acquired the organ in 1935 for installation in the auditorium. The 1921 Wurlitzer console came from the Chicago Theatre, where it was played by organist Jesse Crawford. The organ has been maintained by the Chicago Area Theatre Organ Enthusiasts (CATOE) since 1973.

Other campus buildings include:

- seminarian and faculty residences
- a classroom building
- a refectory
- the Feehan Memorial Library/McEssy Theological Resource Center
- an administration building
- a convent
- a gymnasium
- the Conference Center at the University of Saint Mary of the Lake
- the Cardinal Stritch Retreat House
- a villa residence for the archbishop of Chicago

== USML divisions ==
=== Mundelein Seminary ===
As of 2024, Mundelein has 100 seminarians from 30 American dioceses. Its programs include:

- A two-year Discipleship program to prepare college graduates for seminary life and provide necessary coursework in philosophy and theology. Participants must choose a mission trip abroad or in the United States.
- A four-year Configuration program for a Master of Divinity degree or a Certificate of Studies. The program includes two internships at parishes or hospitals.

=== Pontifical Faculty of Theology ===
The Pontifical Faculty provides seminarians with three degrees in sacred theology:

- Sacred Theology Baccalaureate
- Licentiate of Sacred Theology
- Sacred Theology Doctorate

=== School of Parish Leadership & Evangelization ===
The School of Parish Leadership & Evangelization (SPLE) has several programs:

- The Graduate Degree Programs are designed for both seminarians and lay people who want advanced degrees in liturgy, pastoral studies and theology.
- The Parish Ministry Programs are for all lay people who want to earn a Certificate of Lay Leadership or certification as a catechetical coordinator.
- The Institute for Diaconal Studies is a four-year program to prepare men to become permanent deacons. The first year is spent in prayer and self-examination, the remaining three years in academic preparation. Candidates' wives must participate in monthly spiritual sessions and group sessions.
- The Escuela de Liderazgo para la Evangelización (Leadership School for Evangelization) is a Spanish-language program for permanent deacons, parish workers and lay people.

== Notable alumni ==
- Alfred Leo Abramowicz
- James Altman
- Robert Barron
- Edward Braxton
- Patrick Thomas Brennan
- Maurice Francis Burke
- Robert Gerald Casey
- Edwin R. Chess
- George Clements
- Daniel Coughlin
- William Edward Cousins
- Edward Egan
- Dawn Eden Goldstein
- Andrew Greeley
- Wilton Daniel Gregory
- Ronald Aldon Hicks
- Gerald Frederick Kicanas
- Jerome Edward Listecki
- John L. May
- Thomas Joseph Murphy
- William Aloysius O'Connor
- Thomas J. Paprocki
- Michael Pfleger
- Patrick William Riordan
- Edward James Slattery
- Dennis E. Spies
- John George Vlazny

== Cemetery and burials ==
Amongst the graves on campus are those of two former archbishops of Chicago:

- Albert Gregory Meyer (cemetery)
- George Mundelein (Chapel of the Immaculate Conception)

== Dioceses served ==
In addition to the archdiocese of Chicago, the seminary was used by the following dioceses as of the 2020–2021 academic year:

United States

- Diocese of Albany
- Archdiocese of Atlanta
- Diocese of Cheyenne
- Diocese of Davenport
- Archdiocese of Dubuque
- Diocese of El Paso
- Diocese of Fairbanks
- Diocese of Grand Rapids
- Diocese of Jefferson City
- Diocese of Joliet
- Diocese of Lafayette
- Diocese of Las Cruces
- Diocese of Las Vegas
- Diocese of Lubbock
- Diocese of Rockford
- Diocese of Saginaw
- Diocese of San Jose
- Archdiocese of Seattle
- Diocese of Springfield-Cape Girardeau
- Diocese of Tucson
- Diocese of Wichita
- Diocese of Yakima
- Syro-Malabar Catholic Eparchy of St. Thomas of Chicago

Uganda

- Archdiocese of Kampala
- Diocese of Kiyinda-Mityana

India

- Syro-Malabar Catholic Archeparchy of Kottayam
