= Gerald Frederick Kicanas =

American Catholic prelate (born 1941)

His Excellency, The Most Reverend Gerald Frederick Kicanas
- Bishop Emeritus of Tucson
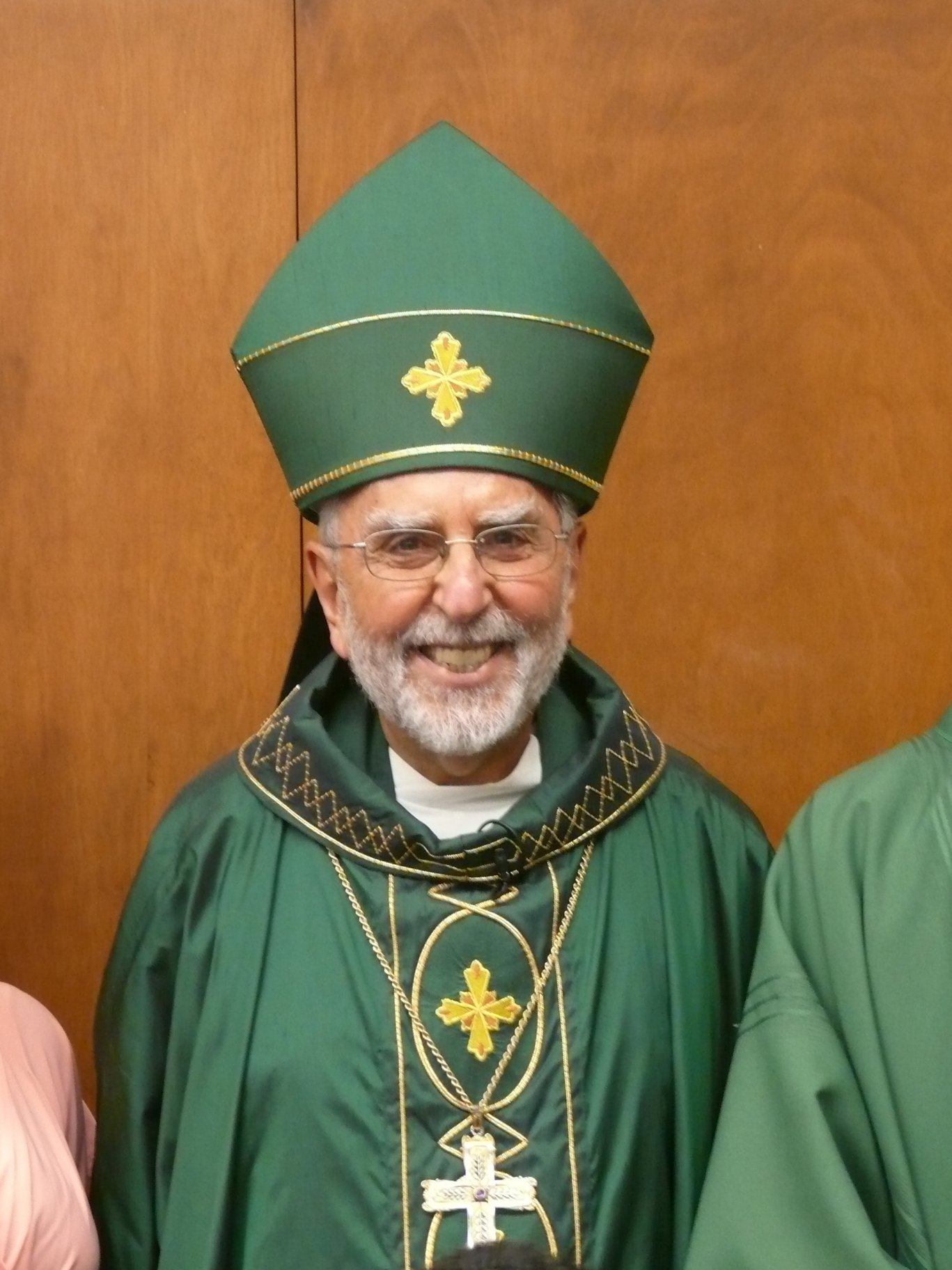
- Bishop Kicanas in 2013
- Church: Catholic
- Diocese: Tucson
- Appointed: October 30, 2001
- Installed: March 7, 2003
- Retired: October 3, 2017
- Predecessor: Manuel Moreno
- Successor: Edward Weisenburger
- Previous posts: Auxiliary Bishop of Chicago and Titular Bishop of Bela (1995–2002)

Orders
- Ordination: April 27, 1967 by John Patrick Cody
- Consecration: March 20, 1995 by Joseph Bernardin, Alfred Leo Abramowicz, and Timothy Joseph Lyne

Personal details
- Born: August 18, 1941 (age 84) Chicago, Illinois
- Education: St. Mary of the Lake Seminary; Loyola University Chicago
- Motto: La justicia promueve la paz (Spanish for 'Justice begets peace')

Styles of Gerald Frederick Kicanas
- Reference style: His Excellency; The Most Reverend
- Spoken style: Your Excellency
- Religious style: Bishop

Gerald Frederick Kicanas (born August 18, 1941) is an American Catholic prelate who served as bishop of Tucson in Arizona from 2002 to 2017 and as apostolic administrator of the diocese from 2025 to 2026. He was the apostolic administrator of the Diocese of Las Cruces in New Mexico from September 2018 to July 2019.

== Biography ==
=== Early life ===
Kicanas was born on August 18, 1941, in Chicago, Illinois, to Frederick and Eva Kicanas. His ethnic background is Lebanese; his grandparents were born in Lebanon, and he was both baptized and confirmed in the Melkite Rite. He attended Immaculate Heart Elementary School and Archbishop Quigley Preparatory Seminary in Chicago. Kicanas obtained his Licentiate in Sacred Theology from St. Mary of the Lake Seminary in Mundelein, Illinois.

=== Priesthood ===
Kicanas was ordained to the priesthood for the Archdiocese of Chicago at St. Mary of the Lake on April 27, 1967, by Cardinal John Patrick Cody. He then earned a Doctor of Educational Psychology degree and a Master of Education degree in guidance and counseling from Loyola University Chicago.

He worked as an associate pastor until 1978 and then held various offices at the archdiocesan seminary for over 25 years. He served as rector, principal, and dean of formation at Quigley Preparatory Seminary South in Chicago, and became rector of Mundelein Seminary at the University of St. Mary of the Lake in Mundelein, Illinois, in 1984. While rector, he was a lecturer in community and organization development at Loyola.

Kicanas' other diocesan jobs included acting as director of the Catholic Chaplaincy Program of the Juvenile Temporary Detention Center in Chicago, as a caseworker for Catholic Charities, and as chaplain for the Chicago Parental School, a facility for troubled boys.

=== Auxiliary Bishop of Chicago ===
On January 24, 1995, Pope John Paul II named Kicanas an auxiliary bishop of Chicago and titular bishop of Bela. He received his episcopal consecration at Holy Name Cathedral in Chicago on March 20, 1995, from Cardinal Joseph Bernardin, with Bishops Alfred Abramowicz and Timothy Lyne serving as co-consecrators. Kicanas chose to express his episcopal motto in both Spanish and English: "La Justicia Promueve La Paz" and "Justice begets peace", taken from Isaiah 32:17.

During his tenure as an auxiliary bishop, Kicanas served as episcopal vicar for Vicariate I in the archdiocese, which includes Lake and Cook Counties. He also became involved with vocations, the permanent diaconate, and the encouragement of lay ministry.

During his Chicago years Kicanas was twice involved in managing the cases of priests accused of sexual abuse. While hampered in responding in detail by an ongoing court case, he acknowledged knowing of inappropriate behavior that he connected with immaturity or alcohol, and he said he would have responded more energetically had he known a minor was involved. He also vigorously contested press reports for failing to cite sources and provide context.

=== Bishop of Tucson ===
Kicanas was named coadjutor bishop of Tucson on October 30, 2001, and became bishop upon the resignation of Bishop Manuel Moreno on March 7, 2003. The diocese had been beset by numerous claims of sexual abuse by priests and Kicanas was praised for managing the diocese's response, including using bankruptcy not to evade compensating victims but to establish a process for compensation. The bankruptcy judge praised him, diocesan fundraising improved, and one expert on the US hierarchy called his work "a national model".

On November 13, 2007, Kicanas was elected vice-president of the United States Conference of Catholic Bishops (USCCB), receiving 22 more votes than Archbishop Timothy Dolan. On February 28, 2008, the USCCB elected Kicanas a member of its delegation to the twelfth World Synod of Bishops in Vatican City in October 2008. In June 2009, Kicanas spoke at the annual meeting of the National Leadership Roundtable on Church Management at the Wharton School in Philadelphia. His talk addressed the need for effective communications in the Catholic Church.

On November 16, 2010, Dolan defeated Kicanas in the vote for USCCB president. It was the first time in USCCB history that a sitting vice president was not elected president. According to an article in the Jesuit magazine America, conservative Catholic groups had mounted a strong lobbying campaign against Kicanas. On November 17, 2010, Cardinal Francis George, outgoing USCCB president, appointed Kicanas as chair of the board of directors of Catholic Relief Services.

Kicanas served as chair of the board of the Center for Applied Research in the Apostolate (CARA) in Washington, D.C., and was a member of the board of directors of the National Pastoral Life Center in New York City.

=== Retirement ===
On October 3, 2017, Pope Francis accepted Kicanas' resignation as bishop of Tucson and named as his successor Bishop Edward J. Weisenburger.Kicanas was appointed chair of the board of directors at the National Catholic Educational Association on In January 2018, replacing Bishop George V. Murry. On September 28, 2018, Kicanas was named apostolic administrator of the Diocese of Las Cruces after Bishop Oscar Cantú was appointed bishop of the Diocese of San José. His assignment there ended on July 23, 2019.

In December 2021, Kicanas underwent successful open heart surgery at Banner University Medical Center in Tucson. On March 21, 2025, Kicanas was named apostolic administrator of Tucson after Weisenburger was appointed archbishop of Detroit.

=== Honors and awards ===
- Cardinal Joseph Bernardin Award from the Catholic Common Ground Initiative in 2008
- Honorary Doctorate in Humanities from Lewis University in Romeoville, Illinois, in 2010
- Honorary Doctor of Laws from the University of Notre Dame in Notre Dame, Indiana, in 2011
- Bishop John England Award from the Catholic Media Association in 2018

Catholic Church titles
Preceded by -	Auxiliary Bishop of Chicago; 1995–2002	Succeeded by -
Preceded by Manuel Duran Moreno	Bishop of Tucson; 2003–2017	Succeeded by Edward Weisenburger
