= Edwin Michael Conway =

American Catholic priest (1934-2004)

His Excellency, The Most Reverend Edwin Michael Conway
- Auxiliary Bishop of Chicago
- Church: Catholic Church
- See: Titular See of Augurus
- In office: March 20, 1995 - August 9, 2004

Orders
- Ordination: May 3, 1960 by Albert Gregory Meyer
- Consecration: March 20, 1995 by Joseph Bernardin

Personal details
- Born: March 6, 1934 Chicago, Illinois, US
- Died: August 9, 2004 (aged 70) Chicago
- Education: St. Mary of the Lake Seminary; Loyola University of Chicago
- Motto: By faith, charity and humility

Edwin Michael Conway (March 6, 1934 - August 9, 2004) was an American prelate of the Roman Catholic Church. He served as an auxiliary bishop of the Archdiocese of Chicago in Illinois from 1995 to 2004.

== Early life and education ==
Edwin Conway was born on March 6, 1934, in Chicago, Illinois, the second son of Edwin and Nellie Conway. He attended Our Lady of the Angels School on the city's west side and Quigley Preparatory Seminary in Chicago. Conway studied at St. Mary of the Lake Seminary in Mundelein, Illinois, where he received a Bachelor of Arts degree in philosophy in 1956. St. Mary awarded him a Master of Divinity degree in 1960.

== Priesthood ==
Conway was ordained a priest for the Archdiocese of Chicago by Cardinal Albert Meyer at St. Mary of the Lake on May 3, 1960. After his ordination, the archdiocese assigned Conway as an assistant pastor at St. Bonaventure Parish in Chicago. He was transferred in 1965 to St. Mary of the Lake Parish in Chicago.

In 1970, Conway received a Master of Social Work degree from Loyola University Chicago. After graduating from Loyola, he went to work for Catholic Charities in the archdiocese full-time where he held a variety of positions, including its administrator.

== Auxiliary Bishop of Chicago ==
On January 24, 1995, Pope John Paul II named Conway as titular bishop of Augurus and as an auxiliary bishop of Chicago. He was consecrated by Cardinal Joseph Bernardin at Holy Name Cathedral in Chicago. Auxiliary Bishops Alfred Abramowicz and Timothy Lyne were the principal co-consecrators. Conway served as episcopal vicar of Vicariate II from 1995 to 2003.

In 2003, Conway was appointed by Cardinal Francis George as the vicar general of the archdiocese. Conway held that position until he died from esophageal cancer on August 9, 2004.
