= Raymond E. Goedert =

American Catholic prelate (1927–2023)

His Excellency, The Most Reverend Raymond Emil Goedert
- Auxiliary Bishop Emeritus of Chicago; Titular Bishop of Tamazeni
- Archdiocese: Chicago
- Appointed: July 8, 1991
- Installed: August 29, 1991
- Retired: January 24, 2003
- Other post: Titular Bishop of Tamazeni (1991‍–‍2023)
- Previous post: Administrator of Chicago (Nov. 1996 – May 1997)

Orders
- Ordination: May 1, 1952 by Samuel Stritch
- Consecration: August 29, 1991 by Joseph Bernardin, Alfred Leo Abramowicz and John R. Gorman

Personal details
- Born: October 15, 1927 Oak Park, Illinois, U.S.
- Died: December 9, 2023 (aged 96) Chicago, Illinois, US
- Education: Pontifical Gregorian University; University of Saint Mary of the Lake
- Motto: Sine te Jesu nihil sum (Without you, Jesus, I am nothing)

Styles of Raymond Emil Goedert
- Reference style: His Excellency; The Most Reverend
- Spoken style: Your Excellency
- Religious style: Bishop

Raymond Emil Goedert (October 15, 1927 – December 9, 2023) was an American prelate of the Catholic Church in the United States. Goedert served as an auxiliary bishop of the Archdiocese of Chicago in Illinois from 1991 to 2003.

== Biography ==
=== Early years ===
Raymond Goedert was born in Oak Park, Illinois, on October 15, 1927. He attended St. Giles Elementary School in Oak Park and Archbishop Quigley Preparatory Seminary in Chicago.

He also went to University of St. Mary of the Lake Seminary in Mundelein, Illinois, where he was awarded a Licentiate in Sacred Theology.

=== Priesthood ===
On May 1, 1952, Goedert was ordained to the priesthood at St. Mary of the Lake for the Archdiocese of Chicago by Cardinal Samuel Stritch. Arter his ordination, Goedert served as associate pastor for St. Gabriel and Blessed Sacrament Parishes in Chicago, and Mater Christi Parish in North Riverside, Illinois. Several years later, he went to Rome to study at the Pontifical Gregorian University in Rome, where in 1956 he obtained a Licentiate of Canon Law.

Goedert was sailing back to New York on the SS Andrea Doria when it collided off the coast of Massachusetts with the MS Stockholm (1946) in July 1956. The passengers were successfully evacuated before the Andrea Doria sank the next day.

Goedert also served as a notary, vice officialis, judge of the tribunal, archdiocesan consultor, vicar for priests, archdiocesan director of NAIM, and pastor of St. Barnabas Parish in Chicago.Goedert served as vicar general of the archdiocese from 1995 to 2003 and again briefly from August 2004 to November 2004.

=== Auxiliary Bishop of Chicago ===
On July 8, 1991, Pope John Paul II appointed Goedert as auxiliary bishop of Chicago and titular bishop of Tamazeni.He was consecrated by then Archbishop Joseph Bernardin at the Holy Name Cathedral in Chicago on August 29, 1991. In 1998, Goedert was one of 75 bishops to condemn the U.S. policy on strategic nuclear weapons.

=== Retirement and legacy ===
Goedert sent his letter of retirement as auxiliary bishop of Chicago to John Paul II on January 24, 2003.

In 2008, as part of a legal settlement between the archdiocese and sexual abuse victims, Goedert answered questions in a deposition. He admitted that when he was vicar general of the archdiocese, he knew of sexual abuse allegations against 25 priests. However, he did not report any of them to police because the standard practice then was to forward the matter to the diocese attorneys. The attorneys would then tell him if a police report was necessary, but they never did.

Goedert served as vicar general under Bernardin and lived with Cardinal Francis George in the archbishop's mansion during his entire ministry. Goedert was with both men when they died and gave last rites to George.

== Death ==
Goedert died in Chicago on December 9, 2023, at the age of 96.

== See also ==
- Catholic Church in the United States
- Hierarchy of the Catholic Church
- Historical list of the Catholic bishops of the United States
- List of Catholic bishops in the United States
- Lists of popes, patriarchs, primates, archbishops, and bishops

== Episcopal succession ==
Catholic Church titles
Preceded by First	Titular Bishop of Tamazeni; 1991–2023	Succeeded by Vacant
Preceded by —	Auxiliary Bishop of Chicago; 1991–2003	Succeeded by —
