= John R. Manz =

American Catholic bishop (1945–2023)

His Excellency, The Most Reverend John Raymond Manz
- Auxiliary Bishop Emeritus of Chicago
- Archdiocese: Chicago
- Appointed: January 23, 1996
- Installed: March 5, 1996
- Retired: July 1, 2021
- Other post: Titular Bishop of Mulia (1996–2023)

Orders
- Ordination: May 12, 1971 by John Cody
- Consecration: March 5, 1996 by Joseph Bernardin, Wilton Daniel Gregory, and Plácido Rodriguez

Personal details
- Born: November 14, 1945 Chicago, Illinois, U.S.
- Died: July 14, 2023 (aged 77)
- Education: Niles College; University of St. Mary of the Lake
- Motto: En tus manos encomiendo mi espiratu (I commend my spirit to Your hands)

Styles of John Raymond Manz
- Reference style: His Excellency; The Most Reverend
- Spoken style: Your Excellency
- Religious style: Bishop

John Raymond Manz (November 14, 1945 – July 14, 2023) was an American prelate of the Catholic Church. He served as an auxiliary bishop of the Archdiocese of Chicago in Illinois from 1996 to 2021.

== Biography ==
=== Early life ===
Manz was born on November 14, 1945, in Chicago, Illinois, and attended St. Martha School in Morton Grove, Illinois. He graduated from Quigley Preparatory North Preparatory Seminary in Chicago in 1963, he then earned a Bachelor of Philosophy degree from Niles College in Chicago in 1967. Manz then attended University of St. Mary of the Lake in Mundelein, Illinois, receiving a Master of Divinity degree in 1971.

=== Priesthood ===
Manz was ordained to the priesthood at St. Mary of the Lake for the Archdiocese of Chicago by Cardinal John Cody on May 12, 1971. He then served as associate pastor at two Chicago parishes: Providence of God until 1978, and St. Roman from 1978 to 1983. Manz was pastor of St. Agnes of Bohemia Parish in Chicago from 1983 to 1996, during which time he also served as dean of Chicago's Lower West Side (1987-1996).

=== Auxiliary Bishop of Chicago ===
On January 23, 1996, Pope John Paul II appointed Manz as an auxiliary bishop of the Archdiocese of Chicago and as the titular bishop of Mulia. He was consecrated at Holy Name Cathedral in Chicago on March 5, 1996, by Cardinal Joseph Bernardin, with Bishops Wilton Gregory and Plácido Rodriguez serving as co-consecrators.

As an auxiliary bishop, Manz served as episcopal vicar for Vicariate III until August 2011, when he transferred to Vicariate IV. Within the United States Conference of Catholic Bishops, Manz was chair of the Subcommittee on Pastoral Care of Migrants, Refugees and Travelers; and a member of the Committee on Cultural Diversity in the Church and Subcommittee on the Church in Latin America.

=== Resignation and death ===
Pope Francis accepted Manz's letter of resignation as auxiliary bishop of Chicago on July 1, 2021. Manz died on July 14, 2023, at age 77.

Catholic Church titles
Preceded by —	Auxiliary Bishop of Chicago; 1996–2021	Succeeded by —
Preceded by Oswald Thomas Colman Gomis	Titular Bishop of Mulia; 1996–2023	Succeeded by Vacant
