= Reynold Henry Hillenbrand =

American Catholic Church leader

Reynold Henry Hillenbrand (July 19, 1904 – May 22, 1979) was an American Catholic priest and leader in the Liturgical Movement, He was a seminary rector, pastor, and Catholic Action chaplain. He followed the methods of Belgian Cardinal Joseph Cardijn.

== Early life and education ==
Hillenbrand was born on July 19, 1904, in Chicago, Illinois, second among nine children and grandchild of German immigrants in Wisconsin. His parents were George Hillenbrand and Eleanor Schmidt and members of Saint Michael’s parish in Chicago’s Old Town.

Personally recruited by Cardinal George Mundelein to attend Archbishop Quigley Preparatory Seminary, Hillenbrand graduated and matriculated to Saint Mary of the Lake Seminary (Mundelein Seminary), where he founded and edited the school's daily newspaper, The Candle. He was also a member of the school orchestra and choir. He completed a license and doctorate at Saint Mary of the Lake.

== Career ==
In 1929, Hillenbrand was ordained to the priesthood. In 1931, Cardinal George Mundelein named Hillenbrand, age 31, rector of Saint Mary of the Lake Seminary.

Named a monsignor, Hillenbrand's three-part approach of faithfully presenting papal teaching, calling lay apostles, and bringing laity through the Catholic liturgy to social action, helped form US Catholic leadership prior to the Second Vatican Council, which his innovations during the liturgical reforms of Pope Pius XII anticipated.

Hillenbrand also championed the causes of labor and race relations, and brought the first women speakers, Dorothy Day, and later Baroness Catherine de Hueck Doherty, to the University of St. Mary of the Lake, his alma mater, where he served as rector from 1936-1944.

Several of Hillenbrand's seminary students, including Alfred Leo Abramowicz, Romeo Roy Blanchette, Daniel Cantwell, Michael R. P. Dempsey, John Joseph Egan, Thomas Joseph Grady, George G. Higgins, Timothy Joseph Lyne, Eugene F. Lyons, Edward A. Marciniak, John L. May, Paul Casimir Marcinkus, Cletus F. O'Donnell, William J. Quinn, and James A. Voss, became influential in social action and/or in both pre- and post-Vatican II American Catholic affairs.

Hillebrand died in 1979.

== Legacy ==
Hillenbrand Books, published by The Liturgical Institute at the University of Saint Mary of the Lake, in collaboration with Liturgy Training Publications, is a scholarly book series named in Hillenbrand's honor.

A Reynold Hillenbrand Institute was based in Chicago's archdiocesan college seminary from 1992–94, moved to the University of Saint Mary of the Lake, and closed at the approximate time of the founding of the Liturgical Institute there in 2000. A Hillenbrand lecture series continues at the Liturgical Institute.
