= Friscia =

Friscia (pronounced [ˈfriʃʃa]) is an Italian surname from Sicily. Notable people with the surname include:

- Albert J. Friscia (1911–1989), Italian-American sculptor
- Arline Friscia (1934–2019), American politician
- Glenn Friscia, American DJ, member of the duo Friscia & Lamboy
