= Goedert =

Goedert is a surname. Notable people with the surname include:

- Dallas Goedert (born 1995), American football player
- Johny Goedert (1929-2013), Luxembourgish racing cyclist
- Michel Goedert, Luxembourgish-British neuroscientist
- Raymond E. Goedert (1927-2023), American Roman Catholic titular bishop of Tamazeni
