= Thad J. Jakubowski =

US catholic prelate (1924–2013)

His Excellency, The Most Reverend Thad Joseph Jakubowski
- Titular Bishop of Plestia; Auxiliary Bishop of Chicago
- See: Chicago

Orders
- Ordination: May 3, 1950 by Samuel Alphonsus Stritch
- Consecration: April 11, 1988 by Joseph Bernardin

Personal details
- Born: April 5, 1924 Chicago, Illinois, US
- Died: July 14, 2013 (aged 89) Chicago
- Denomination: Roman Catholic Church
- Education: St. Mary of the Lake Seminary; Loyola University Chicago
- Motto: Delectionem dei servate (Keep the delight of God)

Thaddeus "Thad" Joseph Jakubowski (April 5, 1924 – July 14, 2013) was an American prelate of the Roman Catholic Church. He served as an auxiliary bishop of the Archdiocese of Chicago in Illinois from 1988 to 2003

== Early life ==
Thad Jakubowski was born in Chicago, Illinois on April 5, 1924 to Michael and Victoria Jakubowski. As a child, he attended St. Mary Magdalene School in Chicago. Deciding to become a priest, he then entered the Archbishop Quigley Preparatory Seminary, the minor seminary in Chicago. Jakubowski continued his preparate at St. Mary of the Lake Seminary in Mundelein, Illinois. He was awarded a Bachelor Arts degree and a Licentiate in Sacred Theology from St. Mary. He later received a Master of Arts degree in classics from Loyola University Chicago.

== Priesthood ==
Jakubowski was ordained into the priesthood for the Archdiocese of Chicago on May 3, 1950, by Cardinal Samuel Alphonsus Stritch. After his ordination, the archdiocese assigned Jakubowski as an assistant pastor at St. Ann Parish in Chicago. In 1957, he was appointed to the faculty at Archbishop Quigley to teach the classics; he eventually became dean of students.

In 1976, Jakubowski left Archbishop Quigley to serve as pastor of St. Robert Bellarmine Parish in Chicago. During this period, he was also an urban vicar and head of a deanery.

=== Auxiliary bishop of Chicago ===
Pope John Paul II appointed Jakubowski as titular bishop of Plestia and as an auxiliary bishop of Chicago, Illinois on February 18, 1988. He was consecrated in Chicago at Holy Name Cathedral by Cardinal Joseph Bernardin on April 11, 1988. As auxiliary bishop, he served as a liaison between the Polish community in the archdiocese and Bernardin.

Jakubowski retired as auxiliary bishop of Chicago on January 24, 2003. He died at St. Mary of Providence Home in Chicago on July 14, 2013.
