= John R. Gorman =

American prelate of the Catholic Church (1925–2025)

His Excellency, The Most Reverend John Robert Gorman
- Auxiliary Bishop Emeritus of Chicago; Titular Bishop of Catula
- Archdiocese: Chicago
- Appointed: February 16, 1988
- Installed: April 11, 1988
- Retired: January 24, 2003
- Other post: Titular Bishop of Catula (1988–2025)

Orders
- Ordination: May 1, 1952 by Samuel Stritch
- Consecration: April 11, 1988 by Joseph Bernardin, Alfred Leo Abramowicz, and Nevin William Hayes

Personal details
- Born: December 11, 1925 Chicago, Illinois, U.S.
- Died: June 1, 2025 (aged 99)
- Education: St. Mary of the Lake Seminary; Loyola University Chicago
- Motto: In spiritu Jesu (In the spirit of Jesus)

Styles of John Robert Gorman
- Reference style: His Excellency; The Most Reverend
- Spoken style: Your Excellency
- Religious style: Bishop

John Robert Gorman (December 11, 1925 – June 1, 2025) was an American prelate of the Roman Catholic Church. Gorman served as an auxiliary bishop of the Archdiocese of Chicago in Illinois from 1988 to 2003. During his tenure as auxiliary bishop, Gorman was instrumental in the creation of the first internal review panel for sexual abuse allegations in an American archdiocese.

== Biography ==
=== Early life ===
Gorman was born in Chicago, Illinois, on December 11, 1925. He attended Visitation Elementary School in Chicago. After deciding to enter the priesthood, Gorman enrolled at the Archbishop Quigley Preparatory Seminary, the minor seminary in Chicago. Gorman then attended St. Mary of the Lake Seminary in Mundelein, Illinois, where he was awarded his Licentiate in Theology and Bachelor of Theology degree. Gorman later received Master of Psychology and Doctor of Clinical Psychology degrees from Loyola University Chicago.

=== Priesthood ===
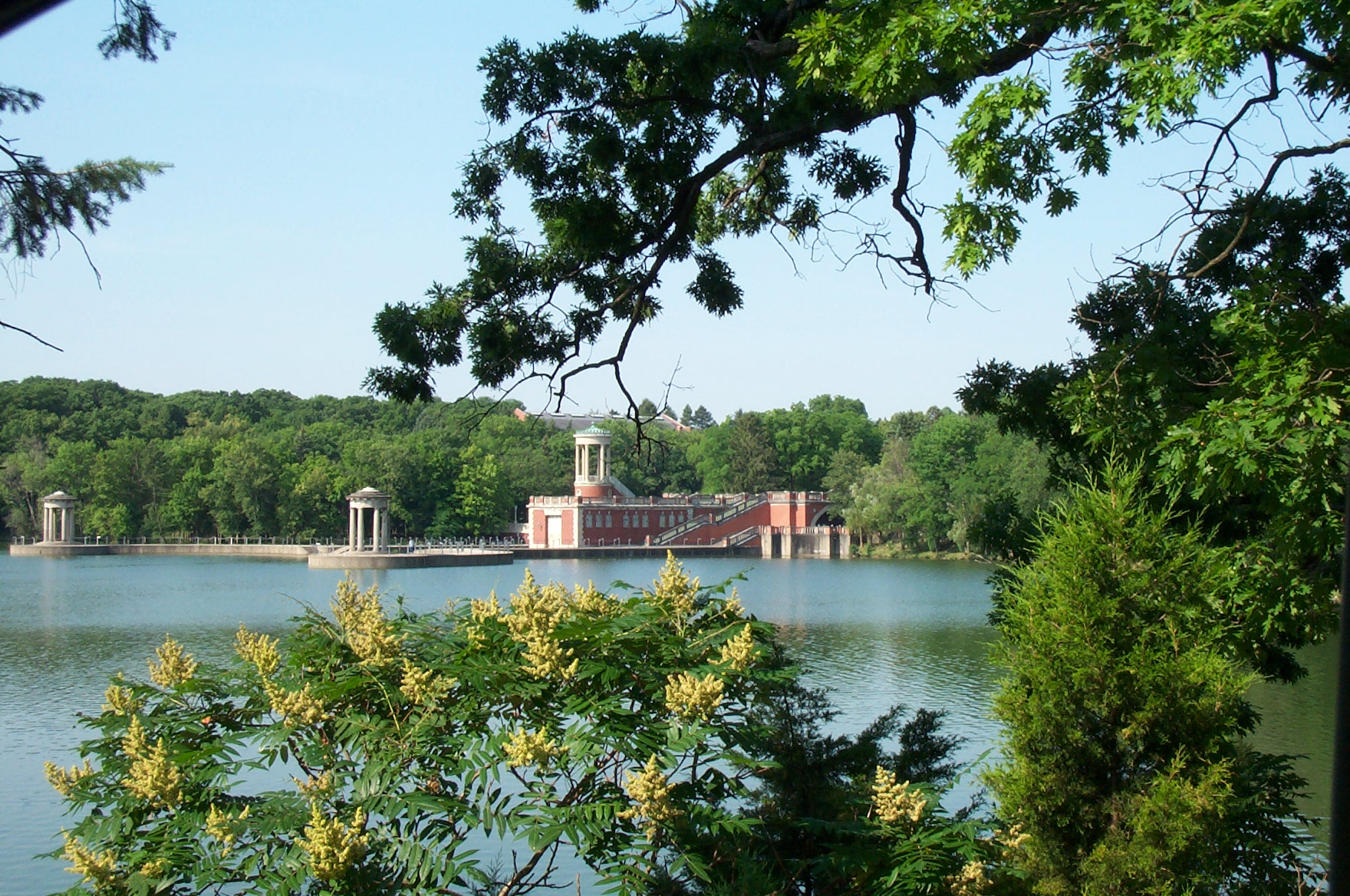
St. Mary of the Lake Seminary, Mundelein, Illinois (2008)

On May 1, 1952, Gorman was ordained a priest for the Archdiocese of Chicago at Saint Mary of the Lake by Cardinal Samuel Stritch. After his ordination, the archdiocese assigned Gorman as an associate pastor in the Chicago parishes of St. Andrew, St. Odilo, and St. Nicholas of Tolentine. At the same time, he served was a faculty member at Archbishop Quigley, the Niles College Seminary in Chicago, the Loyola Pastoral Studies Institute in Chicago, and the Notre Dame University summer school.

In 1965, Gorman was appointed president of St. Mary of the Lake Seminary. At that time, the Second Vatican Council was changing seminarian education worldwide. In a 2021 interview,Gorman remarked:

When I was there (as a seminarian), everything was silent in the buildings and everything was concentrated on the individual. Vatican II defined the church as being in service to the people. We started doing things with the seminarians in groups, with prayer and formation. We sent them out to the parishes when they were still in seminary so they could have contact with the people, because that’s where the guys would be working.

In 1973, Gorman was assigned as pastor to St. Michael Parish in Orland Park, Illinois. Gorman became director of the archdiocesan Department of Parish/Pastoral Services in 1986.

=== Auxiliary Bishop of Chicago ===
On February 16, 1988, Pope John Paul II appointed Gorman as an auxiliary bishop of Chicago and titular bishop of Catula. He was consecrated on April 11, 1988, by Cardinal Joseph Bernardin, with Auxiliary Bishops Alfred Abramowicz, and Nevin Hayes serving as co-consecrators. Bernardin first assigned Gorman assigned as episcopal vicar of Vicariate I in the archdiocese. In 1990, Bernardin named him as vicar general/vicar for regional services. In 1995, the archbishop assigned Gorman to Vicariate V.

In 1992, Gorman served on a three-person commission investigating sexual abuse allegations in the archdiocese and how the archdiocese was handling them. The commission singled out 59 allegations of sexual abuse against priests, 39 of them being well founded. On June 16, 1992, the commission released its recommendations, including the establishment of an independent review panel to judge all allegations. Bernadin later implemented the proposed reforms. For the US Conference of Catholic Bishops, Gorman in 1996 served on the Bishops' Ad Hoc Committee on Sexual Abuse.

=== Retirement and death ===
On January 24, 2003, Gorman's letter of retirement as auxiliary bishop of Chicago was accepted by John Paul II. Gorman died on June 1, 2025, at the age of 99.

== See also ==
- Catholic Church hierarchy
- Catholic Church in the United States
- Historical list of the Catholic bishops of the United States
- List of Catholic bishops of the United States
- Lists of patriarchs, archbishops, and bishops

== Episcopal succession ==
Catholic Church titles
Preceded by James Kendrick Williams	Titular Bishop of Catula; 1988–2025	Succeeded by Vacant
Preceded by –	Auxiliary Bishop of Chicago; 1988–2003	Succeeded by –
