= Mitch Pacwa =

American Catholic priest (born 1949)

The Reverend Father Mitch Pacwa SJ
- Church: Latin Church; Maronite Church

Orders
- Ordination: June 12, 1976

Personal details
- Born: July 27, 1949 (age 77)
- Denomination: Catholic
- Education: Loyola University Chicago; Vanderbilt University

Mitchell Pacwa (born July 27, 1949) is an American Jesuit priest. He is president and founder of Ignatius Productions and the senior fellow of the St. Paul Center for Biblical Theology.

== Education ==
Pacwa completed high school at Archbishop Quigley Preparatory Seminary in 1967 with the intention of becoming a priest for the Archdiocese of Chicago. He decided that he wanted to be a Jesuit in high school and was accepted after his freshman year at Loyola University Chicago. He officially joined the Jesuits on August 21, 1968. He earned a bachelor's degree in philosophy and theology from University of Detroit Mercy and was ordained a priest of the Society of Jesus on June 12, 1976. He later completed Master of Divinity and Bachelor of Sacred Theology degrees from the Jesuit School of Theology in Berkeley, California, followed by a Doctor of Philosophy degree in Old Testament from Vanderbilt University.

He is an accomplished linguist, speaking several ancient languages including Latin, Koine Greek, Hebrew, Aramaic, and Ugaritic, as well as the modern languages of English, German, Spanish, Polish, Modern Hebrew, Arabic, French, and Italian. He is of Polish descent.

== Ministry ==
He has taught at Loyola Academy, Loyola University Chicago, and the University of Dallas.

In 1984, he was a guest on Mother Angelica’s show and later started hosting for the Eternal Word Television Network (EWTN) and relocated to Alabama. On EWTN, Pacwa hosts or has hosted the following TV shows: EWTN Live, Threshold of Hope, The Holy Rosary in the Holy Land, and Scripture and Tradition with Fr. Mitch Pacwa. Pacwa is also the host of the Wednesday Open Line program and EWTN Live on the EWTN radio network. He also occasionally offers the televised Daily Mass on EWTN.

Fr. Pacwa is biritual; in addition to Latin Rite faculties, he is also authorized to celebrate the Eucharist using the Maronite Rite, known as Qurbono or Divine Liturgy.

== Books ==
- Mitch Pacwa (2011). How to Listen When God Is Speaking:A Guide for Modern-Day Catholics. Word Among Us Press. ISBN 978-159325183-3.
- Mitch Pacwa (2013). The Holy Land An Armchair Pilgrimage. Franciscan Media. ISBN 978-1-61636-613-1.
- Mitch Pacwa (2015). Praying the Gospels with Fr. Mitch Pacwa:Jesus Launches His Ministry. Word Among Us Press. ISBN 978-159325268-7.
- Mitch Pacwa (2016). Praying the Gospels with Fr. Mitch Pacwa:Jesus' Miracles in Galilee. Word Among Us Press. ISBN 978-159325288-5.
- Mitch Pacwa (2020). Wheat and Tares: Restoring the Moral Vision of a Scandalized Church. EWTN Publishing, Incorporated. ISBN 978-168278109-8.
