= George G. Higgins =

American Catholic activist (1916–2002)

George Gilmary Higgins (January 21, 1916 – May 1, 2002) was an American labor activist and Catholic clergyman known as the "labor priest". He was a major force in the Catholic Church's support for Cesar Chavez and his union movement.

== Biography ==
Higgins was a native of Chicago, Illinois, where he attended Archbishop Quigley Preparatory Seminary and the University of St. Mary of the Lake, where he studied under the visionary rector Reynold Henry Hillenbrand.

In 1957 Jimmy Hoffa associate Barney Baker approached Higgins in an attempt to get him to appear at Hoffa's trial for bribery as a performative gesture to the jury. Higgins recalls that Baker requested "that I come give 'James' some 'spiritual guidance' during a recess. When I told him Hoffa was welcome to come to my office, Barney insisted that he needed the spiritual guidance in the courtroom".

Higgins taught at the Catholic University of America, served as chairman of the public review board of the United Auto Workers and chairman of the board of the United Farmworkers' Martin Luther King Jr. Fund.

He was the author of the syndicated column "The Yardstick" and was the author of numerous other writings on worker justice in light of Catholic social teaching.

President Bill Clinton presented Higgins with the Medal of Freedom in August 2000 in recognition of his role as a vocal supporter of the labor movement and an advocate for social justice. Higgins was the 2000 recipient of the Pacem in Terris Award. It was named after a 1963 encyclical letter by Pope John XXIII that calls upon all people of good will to secure peace among all nations. Pacem in terris is Latin for 'Peace on Earth'. In 2001, he was awarded the Laetare Medal by the University of Notre Dame, the oldest and most prestigious award for American Catholics.

He died in La Grange, Illinois, on May 1, 2002.

== Legacy ==
The George Gilmary Higgins papers are housed at the American Catholic History Research Center and University Archives at the Catholic University of America in Washington D.C.
