= Bill O'Neill (American football) =

American football player (1910–2000)

No. 31, 18
- Position: Back

Personal information
- Born: April 25, 1910; Chicago, Illinois, U.S.
- Died: April 27, 1987 (aged 77); Hinsdale, Illinois, U.S.
- Listed height: 6 ft 0 in (1.83 m)
- Listed weight: 187 lb (85 kg)

Career information
- High school: Quigley Prep (Chicago)
- College: Detroit (1929–1931)

Career history
- Detroit Lions (1935); Brooklyn/Rochester Tigers (1936); Cleveland Rams (1937); Rochester Tigers (1937)

Awards and highlights
- NFL champion (1935)
- Stats at Pro Football Reference

William James O'Neill (April 25, 1910 – April 27, 1987) was an American professional football back who played two seasons in the National Football League (NFL) with the Detroit Lions and Cleveland Rams. He played college football at the University of Detroit.

== Early life and college ==
William James O'Neill was born on April 25, 1910, in Chicago, Illinois. He attended Archbishop Quigley Preparatory Seminary in Chicago.

He was a member of the Detroit Titans of the University of Detroit from 1929 to 1931 and a two-year letterman from 1930 to 1931.

== Professional career ==
O'Neill signed with the Detroit Lions of the National Football League (NFL) in 1935. He played in one game for the Lions that season before being released in 1935.

He played in six games, starting three, for the Brooklyn/Rochester Tigers of the American Football League in 1936.

O'Neill signed with the Cleveland Rams of the NFL in 1937 and appeared in the first game in franchise history on September 10, 1937, against his former team the Lions, completing one of two passes for 20 yards and an interception while also rushing four times for 12 yards. He was released by the Rams soon thereafter.

He then returned to the Rochester Tigers and appeared in seven games, starting four, during the 1937 AFL season, scoring two receiving touchdowns.

== Personal life ==
O'Neill died on April 27, 1987, in Hinsdale, Illinois.
