= Center for Applied Research in the Apostolate =

The Center for Applied Research in the Apostolate (CARA) is a national, non-profit, applied social science research center, affiliated with Georgetown University, that studies the Catholic Church. The center opened in March 1965 under its first board chair, Cardinal John Cody, the Archbishop of New Orleans.

== History ==
The Center traces its origins to the 1950s, when superiors of U.S. missionary institutes called for a national "Catholic center for coordinated research and cooperation in all things pertaining to mission and international development of the Church". In 1961 the Archbishop of Boston, Cardinal Richard Cushing, urged an examination of the feasibility of such an institution. The Second Vatican Council recognized the role of social research in aiding local bishops and their dioceses in undertaking their apostolate, and the concept of mission was expanded to encompass the total mission of the Church.

Subsequent meetings led to the incorporation of CARA in August 1963 with its first staff in place by 1964. The center opened in March 1965 under its first board chair, Cardinal John Cody, then archbishop of New Orleans.

In October 1965 Cody announced the existence of the Center at a national meeting of Catholic Bishops, noting that the Center "exists to provide for us the reliable scientific and technical information we require for proper and thoughtful decisions in the very complicated areas of our ministry".

As an applied social science research center, CARA has produced many surveys; program reviews; archival, historical, and other research for a wide range of organizations ranging from the U. S. Conference of Catholic Bishops to individual dioceses, parishes, and religious institutes. Since its founding, the Center has produced nearly 2,000 research reports.

Since 1995, CARA has produced a quarterly research newsletter, The CARA Report, which summarizes recent sociological research on Catholics in the United States.
