= Augurus =

Augurus was an ancient city and former bishopric in Roman Africa, now a Latin Catholic titular see. Its presumed site is at the ruins of Sidi-Tahar and Sidi-Embarec in Algeria.

== History ==
Augurus was important enough in the Roman province of Numidia to become one of its many suffragan sees, and faded like most.

=== Titular see ===
The diocese was nominally restored in 1933 as Latin titular bishopric.

It has had the following incumbents, of the fitting episcopal (lowest) rank :

- Michel-Maurice-Augustin-Marie Darmancier, Marists (S.M.) (1961.12.22 – 1966.06.21)
- Victor-Julien-André Gouet (1966.12.30 – 1988.12.15)
- Gilles Lussier (1988.12.23 – 1991.09.07)
- Simon Akwali Okafor (1992.03.06 – 1994.09.09)
- Edwin Michael Conway (1995.01.24 – 2004.08.09)
- João Carlos Petrini (2005.01.12 – 2010.12.15)
- José Francisco Falcão de Barros (2011.02.16 – ...), Auxiliary Bishop of the Military Ordinariate of Brazil (Brazil)

== See also ==
- Catholic Church in Algeria
