= Tamazeni =

Africa Proconsularis (125 AD)

Tamazeni was a civitas of the Roman province of Byzacena, during the Roman Empire and late antiquity, that was known up until the Muslim conquest of the Maghreb in the 7th century. The town must have been of some importance as during antiquity it was the seat of a bishopric. which remains today as a titular see of the Roman Catholic Church.
