= Archbishop Quigley Preparatory Seminary =

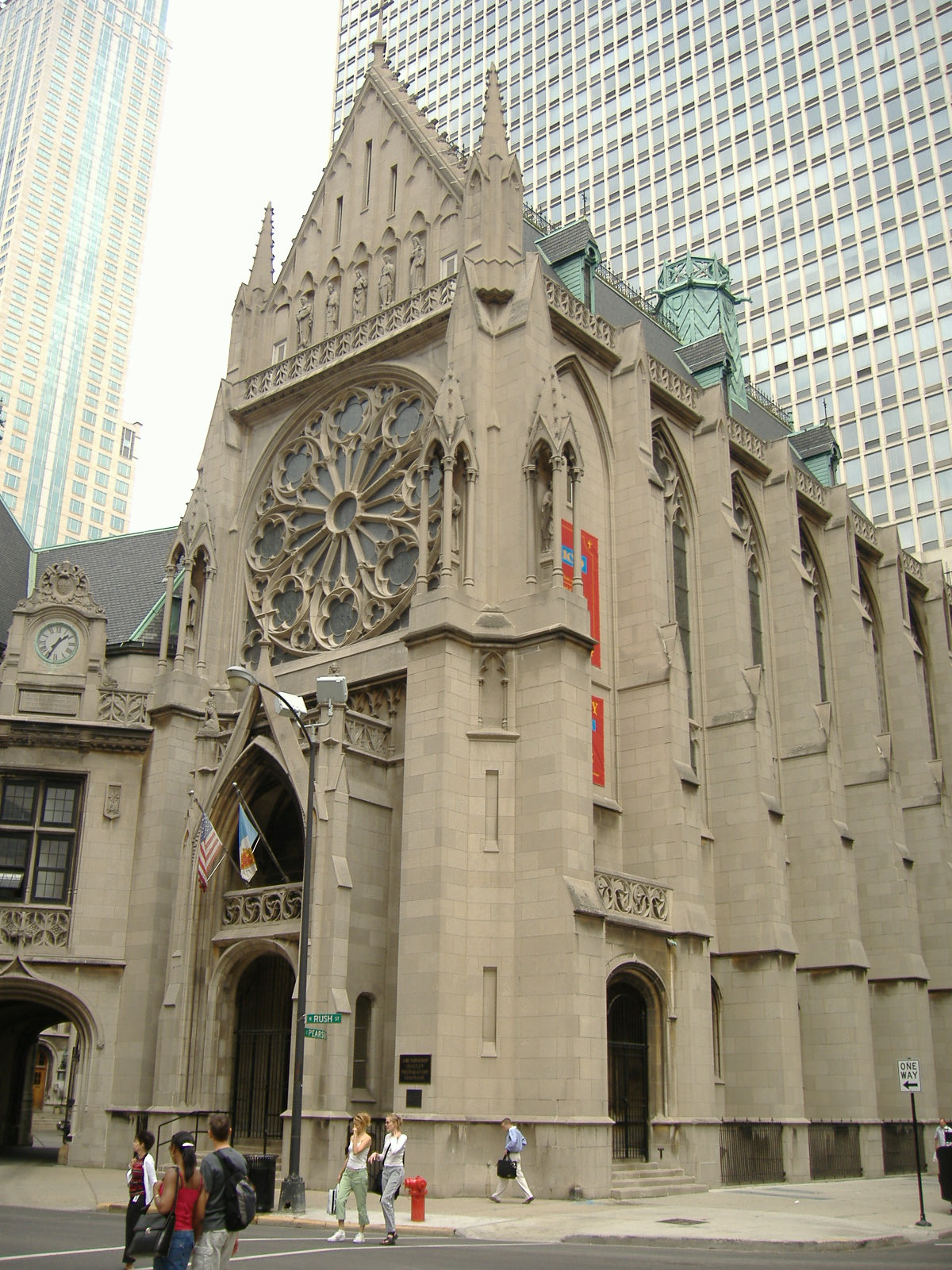

Location
- 103 East Chestnut Street; Chicago, Illinois; United States; 41°53′52″N 87°37′33″W

Information
- Type: private high school seminary
- Motto: Ora et Labora (Pray and work)
- Denomination: Roman Catholic
- Established: 1918 (as Quigley Seminary)
- Founder: George Mundelein
- Status: closed (Archdiocese now uses historic structure for other purposes)
- Closed: 2007
- Oversight: Archdiocese of Chicago
- Grades: 9–12
- Gender: all-male
- Campus type: Urban
- Colors: Navy blue and White
- Team name: Phoenix
- Newspaper: The Talon
- Quigley Preparatory Seminary
- U.S. National Register of Historic Places
- Location within Chicago metropolitan area Location within Illinois Location within the United States
- Built: 1917
- Architect: Zachary Taylor Davis
- Architectural style: Late 19th And 20th Century Revivals
- NRHP reference No.: 96000093
- Added to NRHP: 16 February 1996

Archbishop Quigley Preparatory Seminary was an American seminary preparatory school administered by the Roman Catholic Archdiocese of Chicago for young men considering the priesthood. It closed in 2007, and became the Archbishop Quigley Center in 2008.

The school was named by Cardinal George Mundelein in honor of his predecessor in the area, Archbishop James Edward Quigley.

The school's on-site Chapel of St. James, with stained glass modeled after Sainte-Chapelle in Paris, was dedicated on the 75th anniversary of the Archdiocese of Chicago and the 25th anniversary of Mundelein's priestly ordination on 10 June 1920. It has been listed on the National Register of Historic Places since 1996.

The Quigley seminaries have educated almost 2,500 priests, two cardinals, over forty-one bishops, two Vatican II periti, separate recipients of the Medal of Honor and the Presidential Medal of Freedom, the Order of Merit of the Republic of Poland, and, in sports, two members of the Basketball Hall of Fame.

== Early history ==
=== 1900 to 1910 ===
The first minor seminary in Chicago was Cathedral College of the Sacred Heart. When bishop James Quigley was appointed archbishop of Chicago in 1903, the archdiocese had only 417 diocesan priests and 149 religious order priests to serve 252 parishes. Anticipating the need for more priests, Quigley formulated plans for Cathedral College, to be located in the center of Chicago. He recruited Fr Francis Purcell to head the new minor seminary.

Cathedral College followed the European practice of Saturday classes with Thursday as a day off. The college charged no tuition for the first 52 freshmen students. All applicants had to be nominated by their parish priests. The faculty had nine priests, most of whom were Irish or German. The college provided financial aid to indigent students. By 1905, the seminary had 42 students taught by 10 faculty members.

=== 1910 to 1920 ===
Cathedral College quickly grew from one to three buildings. Quigley realized that the archdiocese needed to build a larger minor seminary, but the Cathedral College site was too small for expansion. However, Quigley's failing health prevented him from starting the seminary construction. Prior to his death, Quigley shared his plans for the new seminary with his successor, Auxiliary Bishop George Mundelein from the Diocese of Brooklyn. After becoming archbishop of Chicago in 1916, Mundelein wrote to the priests in the archdiocese regarding the new minor seminary;

"It is for this reason that in several of the dioceses of the country, the bishops have established the more modern form of the preparatory seminary, where the young boy selected from among his companions by the pastor or confessor, who discerns in him the probable signs of a vocation, the piety, application and intelligence which is required for the candidate for the holy priesthood, even while remaining in the sacred circle of the home and under the watchful eye of a pious mother, is placed apart and educated with those who only look forward to that same great work in life, the priestly field of labor, keeping daily before his mind the sublime vocation of the priesthood, preserving him pure and pious by constant exhortation, by daily assistance at the Holy Sacrifice and by frequent reception of the sacraments."

Mundelein then described the new minor seminary for the archdiocese;

"The buildings are to be in the early French Gothic style of architecture and by reason of the distinct individuality and prominent location, will form a place of interest, not only to visitors, but to all lovers of the City Beautiful. The group will be composed of a main college building, and two ornate wings will be one the chapel, the other the library and gymnasium."

In early 1916, Mundelein purchased land on Rush Street in Chicago for the new minor seminary. The groundbreaking ceremony was held in November 1916 and the cornerstone was laid in September 1917. The new minor seminary, named the Quigley Memorial Preparatory Seminary, started classes in September 1918, with Purcell as its rector. Cathedral College was closed. Quigley Seminary was established with a five-year program of study. Like Cathedral College, it was a day school, so that its students "would never lose contact with their heritage, their families, their Church."

=== 1920 to 1930 ===
Enrollment at Quigley grew rapidly, topping over 600 students in 1922 in a facility designed for 500. The archdiocese built a new wing in the Flemish-Gothic style in 1925, raising the seminary's capacity to 500 students.

As rector, Purcell established a school newspaper, The Candle, and Le Petit Seminaire, the seminary yearbook. He also created the Cathedral Choristers, a boys' choir that sang at Sunday masses at Holy Name Cathedral. Students activities included the catechists, who served at local parishes and the Beadsmen, a student group that prayed the rosary during free time. Basketball was the most popular intramural and interscholastic sport.

=== 1930 to 1940 ===
When Purcell left Quigley in 1931, the Quigley faculty had increased to 42 teachers with a student body of 1,030. Quigley's priest faculty were expected to live in the archdiocese, so as to keep a parish and priestly connection.

Purcell was succeeded as rector in 1931 by Monsignor Philip Francis Mahoney, who resigned due to poor health in 1934. Mundelein then asked the Quigley faculty for their recommendations on a replacement. During the next faculty meeting, Mundelein named Fr Malachy P. Foley as the new rector.

As rector, Foley urged the faculty to earn graduate degrees and regularly met with students to evaluate their classroom performance. According to Koenig's account, Foley "maintained Quigley as a seminary that saw itself as second to no other high school."

On May 18, 1937, speaking to 500 priests at a diocesan conference at Quigley, Mundelein criticized the German Chancellor Adolf Hitler, the Propaganda Minister Joseph Goebbels, and Reichsmarschall Hermann Göring. He condemned the Nazi leaders for using the pretext of "immorality" and sexual scandals to attack Catholic religious orders, organizations and schools in Germany. He stated:

The fight is to take the children away from us. If we show no interest in this matter now, if we shrug our shoulders and mutter, 'Maybe there is some truth in it, or maybe it is not our fight;' if we don't back up our Holy Father (Pope Pius XI) when we have a chance, well when our turn comes we, too, will be fighting alone. . . . Perhaps you will ask how it is that a nation of sixty million people, intelligent people, will submit in fear to an alien, an Austrian paperhanger, and a poor one at that I am told, and a few associates like Goebbels and Göring who dictate every move of the people's lives...

In response, Goebbels demanded that the Vatican discipline Mundelein, which it refused to do. Nazi attacks on Catholic institutions intensified and the regime closed 200 Catholic newspapers.

Mundelein personally recruited Catholic families to send their sons to Quigley. In a 1938 speech to a meeting of the Holy Name Society at Holy Name Cathedral, Mundelein said:

Our place is beside the poor, behind the working man. They are our people; they build our churches, they occupy our pews, their children crowd our schools, our priests come from their sons. They look to us for leadership, but they look to us, too, for support.

Wanting to Americanize the many ethnic groups in the archdiocese, Mundelein used Quigley to break down ethnic barriers among the clergy. However, Polish groups did win a concession, requiring Polish students at Quigley to learn the Polish language, a practice that continued until 1960.

=== 1940 to 1958 ===
In 1944, Monsignor John W. Schmid, a Quigley alumnus, was named as the seminary's fourth rector. Schmid expanded the language curriculum, sending faculty members to study in Mexico, Canada, and Europe. He also added sciences and physical education to the curriculum. By the early 1950s, the enrollment had grown to 1,300. Schmid began planning for another expansion of Quigley, After Schmid retired in 1955, Cardinal Samuel Stritch named Monsignor Martin M. Howard, another Quigley graduate, as rector on May 18, 1955.

Howard's top priority as rector was curriculum reform. Quigley was still using the five-year minor seminary curriculum with the "Sulpician language-school model" that was started by Purcell 50 years earlier. However, it was inadequate for current seminarians, who needed two years of high school along with the first two years of college. After consultations with Howard and the Quigley faculty, Stritch created a new seminary plan for the archdiocese. It included:

- Converting the Quigley Memorial Preparatory Seminary in Chicago from a five-year minor seminary program to a four-year high school seminary program
- Building a second Quigley high school seminary near Chicago's south suburbs
- Founding a four-year free-standing college seminary

In the meantime, the archdiocese rented the Ogden School from the Chicago Board of Education as an annex to handle the overflow of Quigley's 1,300 students.

=== 1958 to 1970 ===
Stritch's successor, Cardinal Albert Meyer, continued with the seminary overhaul plan. The archdiocese opened the new seminary high school, Quigley Preparatory Seminary South, at 77th Street and Western Avenue, in 1961, with Howard as its first rector. The new seminary was located on 40-acre (16 ha) campus that included the Quigley South Chapel of the Sacred Heart. Meyer dedicated Quigley South on September 13, 1962.

The original Quigley Memorial Preparatory Seminary now became the Quigley Preparatory Seminary North, with Monsignor John P. O'Donnell, a Quigley graduate, as its rector. The college seminary, later known as Niles College, opened in late 1961. For a short period in the early 1960s, the two Quigley campuses held joint events, including graduation ceremonies, to instill among the students the spirit of sharing one school.

As rector of Quigley North, O'Donnell encouraged his faculty to seek graduate degrees from many universities. Meyer continued the practice of appointing priests as faculty at the two Quigley seminaries, believing that "young seminarians needed a good number of priest-models to make an intelligent decision about their vocations." In 1965, Quigley North earned accreditation from the North Central Association of Colleges and Schools. Both seminaries took steps to introduce Advanced Placement classes in their curriculums.

During the 1960s, Quigley North and South started experiencing declines in enrollment. Quigley North saw its freshman class decline from 256 in 1962 to 130 in 1967. In 1966 and 1968, the two seminaries instituted several policy changes:

- Abolishing the Thursday day off and Saturday school day, so that seminarians and faculty could participate in activities on Saturday
- Ending the requirement for faculty to wear cassocks
- Allowing seminarians to participate in co-educational activities and organizations
- Easing the suit coat and tie dress code

The seminaries also made changes that allowed its students membership in the National Honor Society.

=== 1970 to 1980 ===
Cardinal John Cody announced in 1970 a new admissions policy for the Quigley seminaries. The original admission requirement, set by Mundelein in 1916, was that Quigley students be educated by priests. Under the admissions reforms, the two seminaries would admit;

- Boys who want to become priests and meet the admissions requirements
- Boys who might become motivated to become priests. Their admission would be based on the judgements of their parish priests.

The new admissions policy also indicated that Quigley North and South should "emphasize the fact that they are contemporary seminaries primarily concerned with the development and encouragement of vocations to the priesthood", and that "a vigorous campaign should be begun, especially on the part of priests, to enroll qualified students."

On October 5, 1979, on a papal visit to the United States, Pope John Paul II delivered three speeches at Quigley South. One speech was directed to the American hierarchy, a second speech to the sick, and the third one to the student bodies of Quigley North and South.

=== 1980 to 2007 ===
In 1983, Fr Thomas Franzman, the rector of Quigley North, reported that "45% of our seniors headed on to Niles College [the college seminary]." By 1989, both Quigley North and South were experiencing steep declines in enrollment and a large reduction in the number of graduates entering the priesthood.

Cardinal Joseph Bernardin closed both Quigley North and Quigley South in December 1989 and in June 1990 opened a new Archbishop Quigley Seminary at the site of Quigley North. For several weeks in early 1990, Quigley students and alumni picketed the archbishop's residence in Chicago to protest the closings. A group bought a full-page ad in the Chicago Sun-Times opposing the actions, The Order of St. Augustine purchased the Quigley South campus from the archdiocese for St. Rita of Cascia High School. The new Archbishop Quigley Preparatory Seminary was recognized by U.S. News & World Report in 1999 as one of 96 outstanding high schools in America.

During the period 1984–1993, Quigley graduated an average of 5.5 students per year who completed the remaining eight years leading to ordination. As of 2006, with an enrollment of 183 students, Quigley was the largest of the seven remaining preparatory seminaries in the country.

Daily attendance at Mass was required of Quigley students for the greater part of the 20th century, following Mundelein's letter of 1916 and John Paul II's 1979 direction quoted above, but the practice declined during the early 90s, when a weekly mass was instituted. However, when Fr Peter Snieg was appointed rector in 2001, per Cardinal George's decision, prayer was the centerpiece of Quigley once again. Since academic school year of 2000–01, Mass had been an integral part of spiritual growth, being required three days a week with Monday morning prayer and Friday afternoon prayer to begin and end each week.

The archdiocese announced on September 19, 2006, that Quigley would closed in June 2007. After one year of renovation, the site became the Quigley Pastoral Center, containing the offices of the archbishop's curia and relative church bodies, with a "Quigley Scholars" program being established to support priestly vocations among high school boys.

== Notable alumni ==
=== Bishops ===
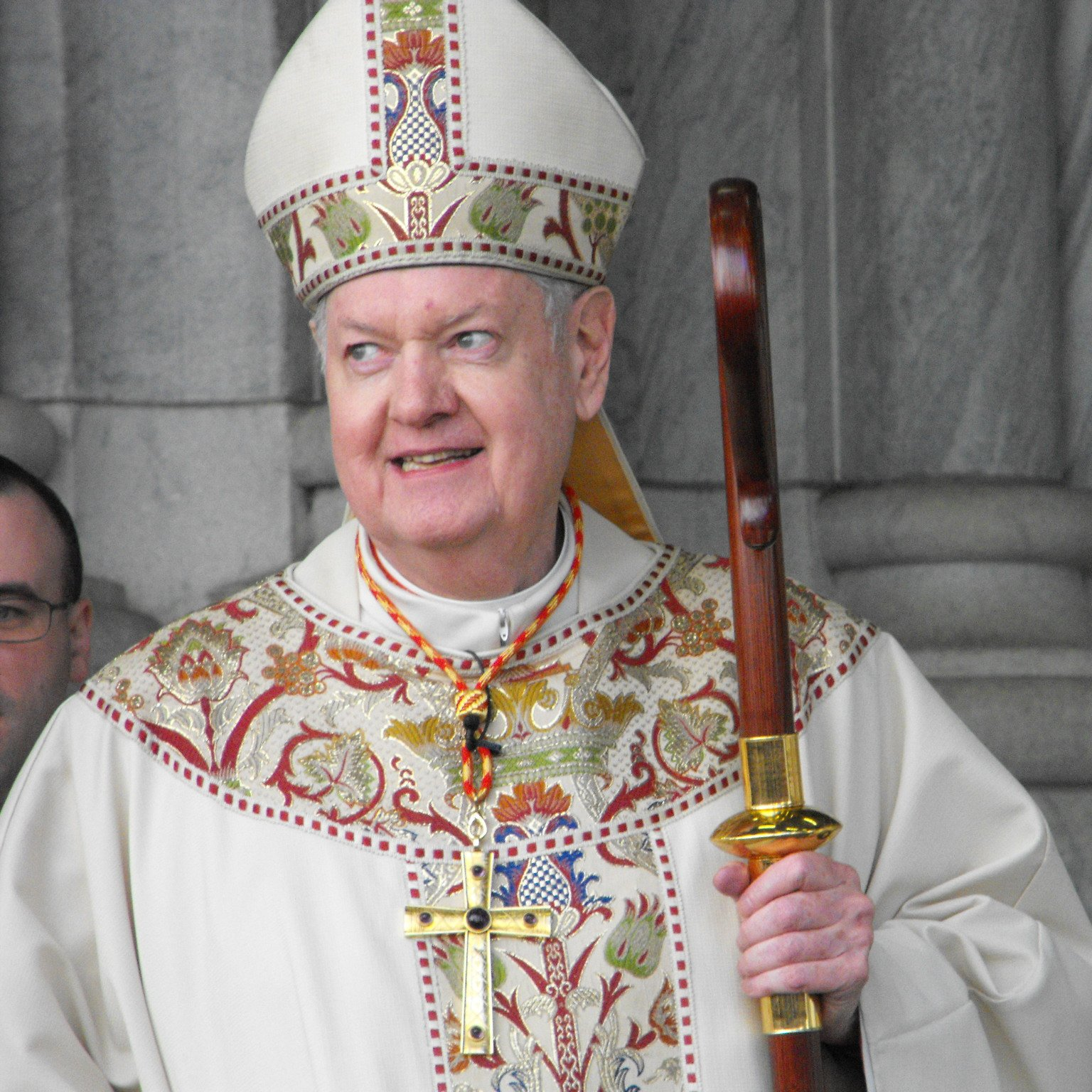
Cardinal Edward Egan

- Alfred Leo Abramowicz (Q '37) was an Auxiliary Bishop of Chicago who served as Director of the Catholic League for Religious Assistance to Poland (1960–1995). He was the principal US fundraising and organizational contact for the Solidarity movement. He was awarded the Order of Merit of the Republic of Poland.
- Romeo Roy Blanchette (Q '31) was Bishop of Joliet (1966–1979).
- Edward K. Braxton (QS '62) is the Bishop of Belleville (2005–present) and former Bishop of Lake Charles (2000–2005).
- William E. Cousins (Q '21) served as Archbishop of Milwaukee (1958–1971).
- Edward Egan (Q '51) was a Cardinal who served as Bishop of Bridgeport (1988–2000) and Archbishop of New York City (2000–2009).
- Thomas Joseph Grady, (Q '32) was the director of the Basilica of the National Shrine of the Immaculate Conception (1956–1967) and Bishop of Orlando (1974–1989).
- Wilton D. Gregory (QS '65) is the first African American archbishop to be elevated to the rank of Cardinal by Pope Francis on November 28, 2020. He remains the Archbishop of Washington, DC. (2019–present). Previously, he was Archbishop of Atlanta (2005–2019). He was the Bishop of Belleville (1994–2004) and president of the United States Conference of Catholic Bishops (2001–04).
- Raymond Peter Hillinger (Q '26) was Bishop of Rockford (1954–1956) and auxiliary bishop of Chicago (1956–1971).
- Francis J. Kane (Q '61) is an Auxiliary Bishop of Chicago (2003–present).
- John Richard Keating (Q '52) was the Bishop of Arlington (1983–1998).
- James Patrick Keleher (Q '51) is the former Archbishop of Kansas City (1993–2005) and Bishop of Belleville (1984–1993).
- Gerald Frederick Kicanas (Q '60) is the Bishop of Tucson (2003–present), served as Vice President of the United States Conference of Catholic Bishops (2007–2010), and as Chair of Catholic Relief Services (2010-).
- Jerome Edward Listecki (QS '67) is the Archbishop of Milwaukee (2010–present). He was formerly the Bishop of La Crosse (2004–2009).
- Timothy Joseph Lyne (Q '37) was Auxiliary Bishop of Chicago (1983–1995).

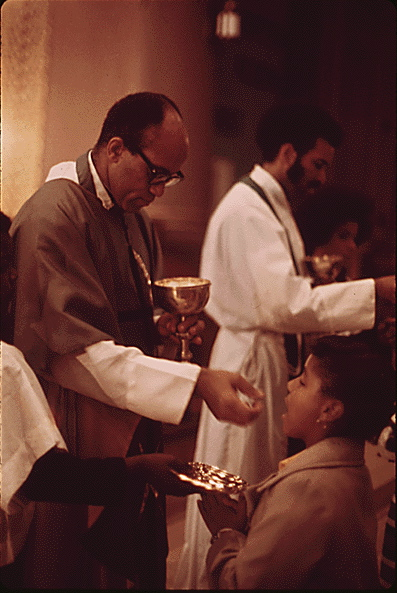
Fr. George Clements

- John R. Manz (QN '63) is an Auxiliary Bishop of Chicago (1993–present).
- Paul Casimir Marcinkus (Q '40) was an archbishop who served in a number of positions in the Vatican, most notably as head of the Istituto per le Opere di Religione (the "Vatican Bank"; 1971–1989).
- John L. May (Q '40) was the Bishop of Mobile (1969–1980) and Archbishop of St. Louis (1980–1992).
- Thomas J. Murphy (Q '51) was the Bishop of Great Falls-Billings (1978–1987) and Archbishop of Seattle (1991–1997).
- Cletus F. O'Donnell (Q '35) was Bishop of Madison (1967–1992).
- Thomas J. Paprocki (QS '70) is the Bishop of Springfield (2010–present).
- Ernest John Primeau (Q '28) was Bishop of Manchester (1960–1974).
- George J. Rassas (Q '61) is an Auxiliary Bishop of Chicago (2005–present).
- Edward James Slattery (Q '59) is the Bishop of Tulsa (1993–present).
- John George Vlazny (Q '55) is the Archbishop of Portland, and former Bishop of Winona (1987–1997).
- Aloysius John Wycislo (Q '28) was Bishop of Green Bay (1968–1983). During World War II and into the 1950s, he helped to establish refugee camps in the Middle East, India, and Africa, and later worked coordinating aid throughout Eastern and Western Europe.
- Michael Fors Olson (QN '84) is the Bishop of Fort Worth (2014–present).
- George J. Rassas (Q '61) is an Auxiliary Bishop of Chicago (2005–present).

=== Other Clergy ===
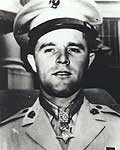
Capt. John H. Leims, USMC

- Daniel Coughlin (Q '53) is the former Chaplain of the United States House of Representatives (2000–2011); the first Roman Catholic to hold that position.
- Monsignor John Joseph "Jack" Egan (Q '37) was an author and social and civil rights activist who marched with Rev. Dr. Martin Luther King Jr. De Paul University's Egan Urban Center is named for him.
- Rev. Andrew M. Greeley (Q '47) was an author, journalist, and sociologist perhaps best known as a columnist for the Chicago Sun-Times.

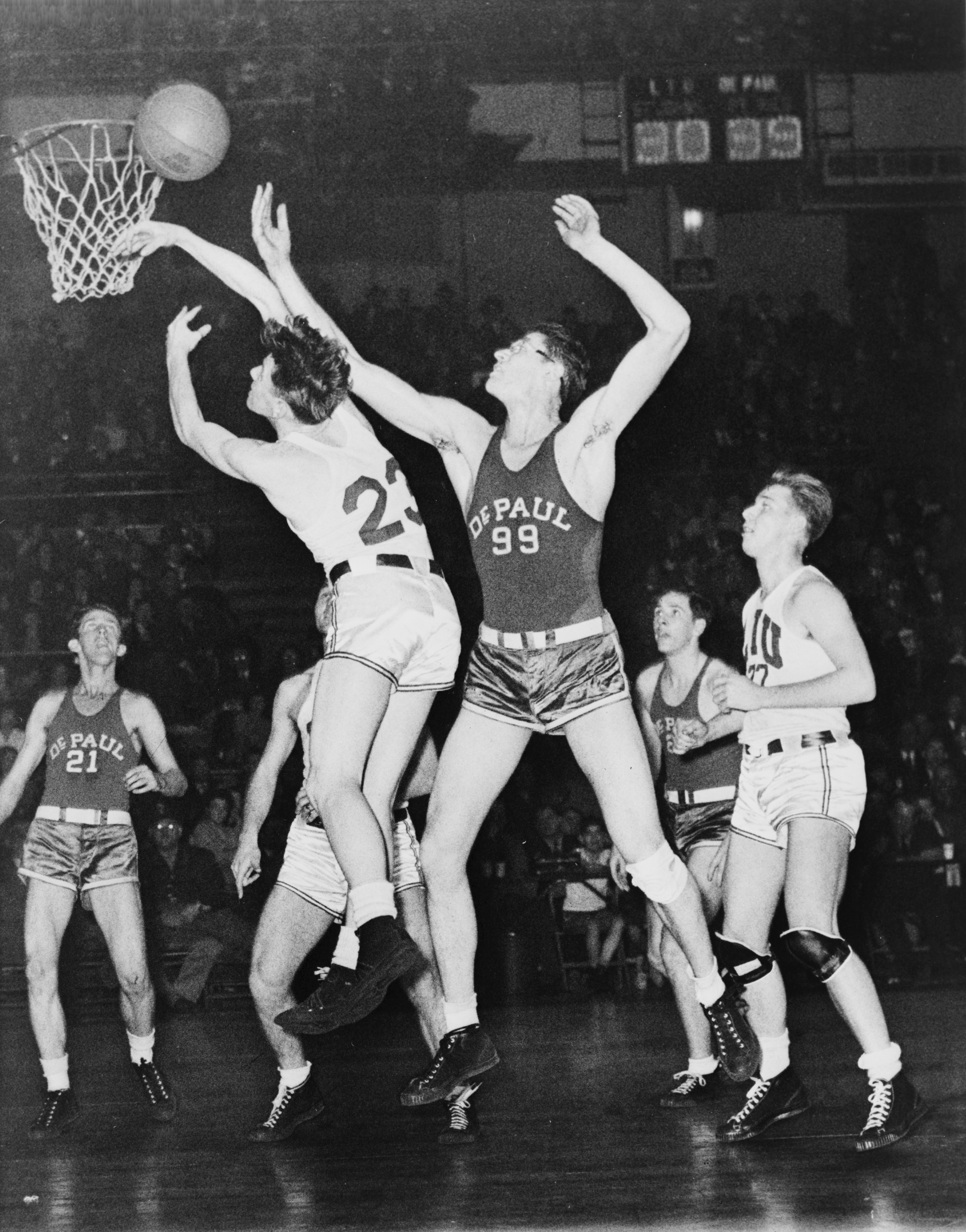
George Mikan (#99)

- Monsignor George G. Higgins, (Q '34) was an author and civil rights activist. In 2000 he received both the Pacem in Terris Award and the Presidential Medal of Freedom.
- Monsignor Reynold Henry Hillenbrand (Q '24) was a Quigley professor and leader in the Liturgical Movement. As rector of University of St. Mary of the Lake from 1936 to 1944, he served as mentor to several activist priests called "Hilly's Men", also mentor to "Specialized Catholic Action" and social action movements.
- Mitch Pacwa SJ (QN '67) is a scripture scholar and EWTN television and radio host.
- Michael Pfleger (QS '67) is a pastor and civil rights activist.

=== Secular ===
- Edward M. Burke (Q '61) is a Chicago alderman; the longest continuously serving alderman in the history of the Chicago City Council.
- Michael Edward Harper (QS '76) is a former NBA center-forward with the Portland Trail Blazers (1980–82).
- John Jordan (Q '29) was the men's basketball coach at the University of Notre Dame (1951–1964).
- James F. Keane was an Illinois state representative and educator
- John H. Leims was a U.S. Marine awarded the Medal of Honor for service during the Battle of Iwo Jima (attended Quigley, later graduated from St. George High School in Evanston, Illinois).
- Harry Lennix (QS '83) is a television and film actor.
- Michael McCaskey was the former chairman of the Chicago Bears (attended Quigley, later graduated from Notre Dame College Prep in Niles).
- Ray Meyer was the head men's basketball coach at DePaul University (1942–84). He was inducted into the Basketball Hall of Fame in 1979 (attended, and later graduated from St. Patrick High School).
- George Mikan (Q' 41) was a Hall of Fame basketball player (1946–56), best known for his time with the Minneapolis Lakers. He was named the greatest player of basketball's first 50 years, and one of the 50 Greatest Players in NBA History.
- Antonio Munoz (QS '82) is an Illinois State Senator (1999–present).
- Bill O'Neill, American football player
- Richard Phelan (Q '55) was an attorney who served as special counsel for the US House investigation of former Speaker Jim Wright and President of the Cook County Board.
- Dan Savage (QN '82), sex columnist and political pundit, co-founder of the It Gets Better Project, left Quigley in his second year.
- Martin Sandoval (QS '82) was an Illinois State Senator (2003–2020).
- Lawrence Suffredin (QN '65) is an attorney and Cook County Commissioner (2003–present).
- Ed Zotti (aka Cecil Adams) (QN '69) is an editor, columnist and author best known for his column The Straight Dope.
