= Albert J. Friscia =

American sculptor

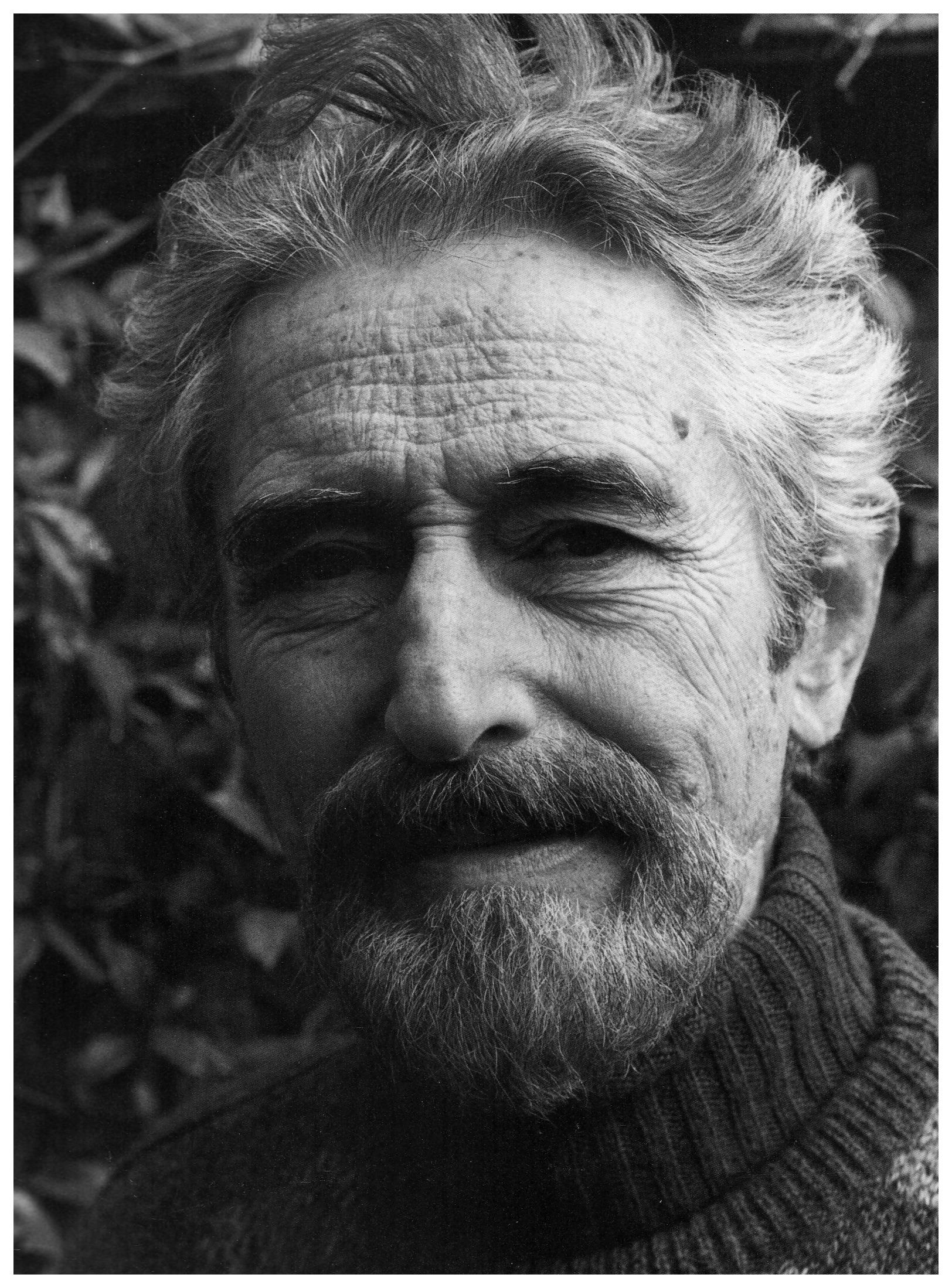
- Born: July 22, 1911
- Died: September 2, 1989; Rome
- Known for: sculpture

Albert J. Friscia (July 22, 1911 – September 2, 1989), was an Italian American sculptor. Initially interested in painting, Friscia studied art at the National Academy of Design in New York City in the Black Mountain College with Ilya Bolotowsky, and in Paris with André Masson, then became a Kinetic artist.

== Important works ==
In the United States and in Italy, he received commissions for a number of works of architectural sculpture, including:

- The massive bronze doors of Holy Name Cathedral, Chicago;
- A contribution to the altar in St. Peter's Basilica, Rome

== See also ==
- Abstract art
- Kinetic art
- Op art

== Bibliography ==
- Albert Friscia of Mantura Bruno – De Luca Editori d’Arte – 2008 – Rome, Italy (in Italian) ISBN 978-88-8016-860-7
