= Catholic Common Ground Initiative =

The Catholic Common Ground Initiative is an intra-ecclesial relations effort launched in 1996 by the National Pastoral Life Center. Its original goal was to dialogue with dissenting Catholics on a variety of unresolved issues that came about in the years following the Second Vatican Council. One of its most notable proponents was the late Cardinal Joseph Bernardin of Chicago.

Its current purpose and central mission is to promote dialogue within the Church on a variety of theological and social issues, including the changing roles of women, human sexuality, healthcare reform, and immigration—challenges facing not just the American Catholic Church but the United States as a whole. Since 2009, the CCGI has been a pivotal component of The Bernardin Center for Theology and Ministry, housed at Catholic Theological Union in Chicago.

== National Pastoral Life Center ==
The National Pastoral Life Center was an organization whose goal was to serve the leadership of the Catholic Church's pastoral ministry, particularly in parishes and diocesan offices. It was founded in 1983 by Rev. Msgr. Philip J. Murnion, of the Archdiocese of New York, with the help of the National Conference of Catholic Bishops "to study and advance the development of parish ministry in a changing U.S. church". It was the publisher of Church magazine, a professional quarterly of pastoral theology and ministry written especially for pastors, parish leaders, and members of diocesan offices. Its founding editor was Margaret O’Brien Steinfels, who began editing the magazine in 1986. The magazine won awards from the Catholic Press Association.

Catherine Patten, RSHM was the coordinator of the Catholic Common Ground Initiative at the National Pastoral Life Center in New York since its beginning in 1996. In November 2009, it was announced that the NPLC was closing down after 25 years of service to the Catholic Church in the United States.

== CCGI ==
In the 1980s, Cardinal Bernardin held listening sessions where Catholics could talk about controversial issues. The Catholic Common Ground Initiative began with Joseph Cardinal Bernardin's 1992 letter "The Parish in the Contemporary Church," which recognized the need to move beyond the liberal/conservative divide so that parishes in the Archdiocese of Chicago could be common places where all come together.

In 1996, Bernardin inaugurated the "Catholic Common Ground Initiative" and was among the authors of its founding document "Called to Be Catholic: Church in a Time of Peril," released August 12, 1996. It originated in a concern that polarization within the Church hinders the ability of the Catholic Church to carry out its mission.

The initiative was met with vocal opposition from four U.S. bishops. Cardinals William Wakefield Baum, James Aloysius Hickey, and Bernard Francis Law were especially opposed to what they perceived as undesirable concessions regarding Catholic teachings on moral theology, thus illustrating the divide among Catholic leaders. According to Professor Julie Hanlon Rubio, "Today, criticism is more likely to come from the left."

Catholic Common Ground is based at The Bernardin Center for Theology and Ministry at Catholic Theological Union in Chicago, where CCGI, while striving to remain centrist, sponsors the annual Cardinal Bernardin Conference, the Msgr. Philip J. Murnion Lecture, the Bernardin Award, and publishes a quarterly newsletter, Initiative Report. As well as the subject of polarization, the Initiative has also sponsored programs on alienation, particularly among young people towards organized religion.

The Catholic Common Ground Initiative has partnered with St. Mary's College in Notre Dame, Indiana since the Spring of 2001. The Hank Center for the Catholic Intellectual Heritage at Loyola University Chicago sponsors an annual "Cardinal Bernardin Common Cause Lecture".

== See also ==
- Spirit of Vatican II
