= Timothy Joseph Lyne =

American prelate (1919–2013)

- Auxiliary Bishop Emeritus of Chicago
- Church: Roman Catholic Church
- Archdiocese: Archdiocese of Chicago
- See: Titular See of Vamalla
- In office: 1983 - 2013
- Predecessor: Enrique Manuel Hernández Rivera
- Successor: vacant
- Previous posts: Auxiliary Bishop of Archdiocese of Chicago; Bishop

Orders
- Ordination: May 1, 1943
- Consecration: December 13, 1983 by Cardinal Joseph Bernardin

Personal details
- Born: March 21, 1919 Chicago, Illinois
- Died: September 25, 2013 (aged 94) Chicago, Illinois

Timothy Joseph Lyne (March 21, 1919 – September 25, 2013) was an American prelate of the Roman Catholic Church. He served as an auxiliary bishop of the Archdiocese of Chicago from 1983 to 1995.

== Biography ==
=== Early life ===
Lyne was born in Chicago, Illinois, on March 21, 1919. He was eldest of four children of Irish immigrant parents, two brothers and a sister. He attended Resurrection and Saint Mel primary schools, then entered Quigley Memorial Seminary, all in Chicago. He then studied at the University of Saint Mary of the Lake in Mundelein, Illinois. While at Saint Mary, Lyne served as a golf caddy for Cardinal George Mundelein. Lyne graduated from Saint Mary with a Master of Arts degree in History and a Licentiate of Sacred Theology.

=== Priesthood ===
Lyne was ordained into the priesthood for the Archdiocese of Chicago by Archbishop (later Cardinal) Samuel Stritch in Chicago on May 1, 1943. After his ordination, Lyne was appointed as parochial vicar of Saint Mary's Parish in Riverside, Illinois. During his time there, Lyne led the effort to build a new primary school and a convent. In 1962, after 19 years at Saint Mary's, he was transferred as parochial vicar to Saint Edmund Parish, in Oak Park, Illinois. Lyne was appointed parochial vicar in 1966 for Holy Name Cathedral Parish in Chicago. A year later, he was named rector for the Cathedral Parish, maintaining that position until 1990.

=== Auxiliary Bishop of Chicago ===
Pope John Paul II appointed Lyne as an auxiliary bishop of the Archdiocese of Chicago and titular bishop of Vamalla on October 31, 1983. He was consecrated on December 13, 1983, by then Archbishop Joseph Bernardin, with Auxiliary Bishop Alfred Abramowicz and Auxiliary Bishop Nevin Hayes serving as co-consecrators. Lyne selected as his episcopal motto: "Grace, mercy, and peace." (the first three words of Paul the Apostle's epistle to Saint Timothy. He was appointed in 1984 as vicar general and as episcopal vicar for Vicariate II in the archdiocese. Lyne also led a major renovation of Holy Name Cathedral.

Lyne was active in the Illinois Council of Churches and the Council of Religious Leaders of Metropolitan Chicago, and participated in a meeting of the Council for a Parliament of the World’s Religious.

=== Retirement ===
Lyne sent his letter of resignation as auxiliary bishop of the Archdiocese of Chicago to Pope John Paul II when he reached the mandatory retirement age for bishops of 75. The pope accepted his resignation on January 24, 1995. However, Lyne continued to serve as episcopal vicar.

Lyne died on September 25, 2013, at age 94, at the rectory of Holy Name Cathedral. When he died, Lyne was one of the oldest Catholic bishops in the United States. Visitation for Lyne took place on September 29 and 30, 2013 at Holy Name Cathedral. He was interred at Mount Carmel Cemetery in Hillside, Illinois.

The Bishop Lyne Residence, a home for retired priests in Palos Park, Illinois, was named after Lyne.
