= Joseph Bernardin =

Catholic bishop and cardinal (1928–1996)

His Eminence Joseph Bernardin
- Cardinal, Archbishop of Chicago
- See: Chicago
- Appointed: July 8, 1982
- Installed: August 25, 1982
- Term ended: November 14, 1996
- Predecessor: John Cody
- Successor: Francis George
- Other post: Cardinal-Priest of Gesù Divin Lavoratore (Jesus the Divine Worker)
- Previous posts: President of the United States Conference of Catholic Bishops and National Conference of Catholic Bishops (1974–1977); Archbishop of Cincinnati (1972–1982); General Secretary Of the National Conference of Catholic Bishops (1968–1972); Auxiliary Bishop of Atlanta (1966–1968)

Orders
- Ordination: April 26, 1952 by John Joyce Russell
- Consecration: April 26, 1966 by Paul John Hallinan
- Created cardinal: February 2, 1983 by John Paul II
- Rank: Cardinal-Priest

Personal details
- Born: April 2, 1928 Columbia, South Carolina
- Died: November 14, 1996 (aged 68) Chicago, Illinois
- Education: University of South Carolina; Saint Mary's College; Saint Mary Seminary; Catholic University of America
- Motto: As those who serve

Styles of Joseph Bernardin
- Reference style: His Eminence
- Spoken style: Your Eminence
- Informal style: Cardinal
- See: Chicago

Ordination history of Joseph Bernardin
History
Episcopal consecration
- Consecrated by: Paul John Hallinan (Atlanta)
- Date: April 26, 1966
Episcopal succession
Bishops consecrated by Joseph Bernardin as principal consecrator
- Daniel Edward Pilarczyk: December 20, 1974
- Thomas Cajetan Kelly O.P: August 15, 1977
- Timothy Joseph Lyne: December 13, 1983
- John George Vlazny: December 13, 1983
- Plácido Rodriguez: December 13, 1983
- Wilton Daniel Gregory: December 13, 1983
- James Patrick Keleher: December 11, 1984
- Thad J. Jakubowski: April 11, 1988
- John R. Gorman: April 11, 1988
- Raymond E. Goedert: August 29, 1991
- Thomas George Doran: June 24, 1994
- Edwin Michael Conway: March 20, 1995
- Gerald Frederick Kicanas: March 20, 1995
- George Vance Murry, S.J.: March 20, 1995
- John R. Manz: March 5, 1996

Joseph Louis Bernardin (April 2, 1928 – November 14, 1996) was an American Catholic prelate who served as Archbishop of Cincinnati in Ohio from 1972 until 1982, and as Archbishop of Chicago in Illinois from 1982 until his death from pancreatic cancer. Bernardin was elevated to the cardinalate in 1983 by Pope John Paul II.

== Biography ==
=== Early life ===
Joseph Bernardin was born on April 2, 1928, in Columbia, South Carolina, to Joseph "Bepi" Bernardin and Maria Maddalena Simion. They were an Austro-Hungarian-born immigrant couple, from the village of Fiera di Primiero, now located in the Northern Italian region of Trentino. Bepi first went to South Carolina to work in a quarry, then came back to Italy to marry Maria. The whole family then moved to Columbia.

Joseph Bernardin was baptized and later confirmed at St. Peter's Catholic Church in Columbia. Bepi died of cancer in 1934 when Bernardin was aged six. When he was older, he took responsibility for his younger sister, Elaine, while his widowed mother worked as a seamstress for the Works Progress Administration. Joseph attended both Catholic and public primary and secondary schools.

Bernardin's original ambition was to become a physician, inspiring him to enroll in the pre-med program at the University of South Carolina (USC) in Columbia. However, after one year at USC, he decided instead to become a priest. He spent one year studying Latin at Saint Mary's College in Kentucky. He then entered the Saint Mary Seminary in Baltimore, Maryland, to study philosophy and prepare for the priesthood. He graduated from Saint Mary in 1948 with a Bachelor of Arts degree in philosophy, then enrolled in The Catholic University of America in Washington, D.C., where he received a Master of Arts degree in education in 1952. His professors wanted him to study in Rome, but he refused out of concern for his mother's health.

=== Priesthood ===
On April 26, 1952, Bernardin was ordained a priest of the Diocese of Charleston by Bishop John J. Russell at St. Joseph Church in Columbia. After his ordination, the diocese assigned him as an assistant pastor at St. Joseph. He also joined the faculty of Bishop England High School in Charleston. In 1954, the diocese moved Bernardin to an administrative position in its chancery. He was named superintendent of the diocesan cemeteries and chaplain at The Citadel, a military college in Charleston.

In 1959, Pope John XXIII named Bernardin a papal chamberlain with the title of monsignor. The same pope named him in 1962 as a domestic prelate.

=== Auxiliary Bishop of Atlanta ===
On March 9, 1966, Pope Paul VI appointed Bernardin as titular bishop of Liguria and auxiliary bishop of the Archdiocese of Atlanta. He was consecrated on April 26, 1966, by Archbishop Paul Hallinan. Bernardin, 38 years old, became the youngest bishop in America. From 1966 to 1968, Bishop Bernardin served as rector of the Cathedral of Christ the King in Atlanta, Georgia.

=== General Secretary of National Conference ===
In 1968, Bernardin resigned as auxiliary bishop of Atlanta to become the first general secretary of the National Conference of Catholic Bishops in Washington, a post he held until 1972. In 1969, Bernardin was instrumental in founding one of the conference's most influential and successful programs, the anti-poverty Catholic Campaign for Human Development (CCHD).

During this period, Bernardin also became affiliated with the Order of Friars Minor, being received into the first order with a habit in 1972.

=== Archbishop of Cincinnati ===
Coat of arms as archbishop of Cincinnati

Pope Paul VI appointed Bernardin as archbishop of Cincinnati on November 21, 1972, and he was installed there on December 19, 1972. Bernardin served in Cincinnati for nearly ten years. While there, he appointed the first woman as editor of the archdiocesan newspaper, The Catholic Telegraph.

During this period, the Vatican appointed Bernardin to the Sacred Congregation of Bishops in Rome and to the permanent council of the Synod of Bishops. He worked to improve ecumenical relations with Jews and Protestants. He also visited Poland and Hungary.

=== Archbishop of Chicago ===
Following the death of Cardinal John Cody of Chicago, Pope John Paul II chose Bernardin, already prominent among his fellow American bishops, to lead the Archdiocese of Chicago. He was appointed the seventh archbishop of Chicago on July 10, 1982. On August 25, 1982, he was installed by the apostolic delegate to the United States, Cardinal Pio Laghi. Bernardin found the archdiocese in disarray, its priests disheartened by years of arbitrary administration and charges of financial misconduct. A New York Times article in 1996 made the following assessment: "With his patient charm and willingness to listen, Bernardin won back the confidence of the clergy and the laity."

=== Elevation to Cardinal ===
In the papal consistory of February 2, 1983, Bernardin was elevated to the College of Cardinals by John Paul II as Cardinal-Priest of Gesù Divino Lavoratore (Jesus the Divine Worker), his titular church in Rome.

=== Response to sexual abuse scandal ===
Bernardin implemented a policy concerning priests accused of sexual misconduct with minors. He removed more than 20 priests and established a new review board to assess allegations, made up primarily of lay people. Bernardin's reforms concerning this issue soon served as a model for other dioceses across the nation.

In 1993, Bernardin announced that he was being sued for sexual misconduct. The plaintiff was a former seminarian, Stephen Cook, who said that Bernardin and another priest had abused him in the 1970s. However, Cook later said that his memories of the abuse emerged under hypnosis; after becoming uncertain of Bernardin's guilt, Cook dropped him from the lawsuit. The two men later met and reconciled. In 1995, Cook said that he had relied on people who told him things that were not true, "asserting that he is absolutely convinced of Bernardin's innocence".

=== Final illness ===
In June 1995, following a string of international visits and pilgrimages, Bernardin underwent surgery for pancreatic cancer. Imaging performed after his surgery showed him to be in remission. However, August 30, 1996, Bernardin announced that the cancer had metastasized to his liver and was inoperable. He turned over the administration of the archdiocese to his vicar general and auxiliary bishop, Raymond Goedert. Bernardin then focused his ministry on the sick, becoming the "unofficial chaplain" to cancer patients at Loyola University Hospital in Chicago. In September, Bernardin delivered a major address, "Seamless Garment of Life", at Georgetown University.

On September 23, Bernardin traveled to Rome to visit Pope John Paul II and the town of Assisi. During that trip, Bernardin made his funerary arrangements. After returning to Chicago, he arranged for the care for his mother, whom he visited daily at her nursing home, and the distribution of his personal possessions. He sent his personal papers and administrative files to the Archives and Records Center in the archdiocese.

Two weeks before his death, Bernardin and his biographer Eugene Kennedy completed The Gift of Peace, a book containing Bernardin's reflections on the end of life and his own approaching death. He stated that he saw death as "a continuation and a friend to prepare properly for by conducting ourselves well and letting go to abandon one's self to God in the end".

Bernardin said goodbye to 800 diocesan and religious clergy in a meeting at Holy Name Cathedral weeks before his death. On October 7, he met the Presbyterate; at the end of the month, he withdrew from active ministry owing to his deteriorating strength. In his last days, Bernardin wrote to the United States Supreme Court, arguing against assisted suicide.

=== Death and legacy ===
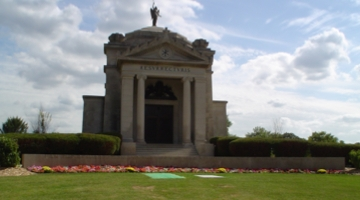
Bishops' Mausoleum, Mount Carmel Cemetery, Hillside, Illinois (2004)

On November 14, 1996, Bernardin died in Chicago from pancreatic cancer at the age of 68. His funeral Mass was celebrated by his friend Cardinal Roger Mahony, with the homily being delivered by his friend Monsignor Kenneth Velo. At Bernardin's wake for priests, his friend the Reverend Scott Donahue spoke. The Windy City Gay Chorus performed at Bernardin's funeral, reportedly at his request. Bernardin was interred in the Bishops' Mausoleum at Mount Carmel Cemetery in Hillside, Illinois.

Bernardin was an influential figure in the Catholic Church in the United States following the Second Vatican Council; George Weigel called him "arguably the most powerful Catholic prelate in American history".

In December 2023, James Grein said that former cardinal Theodore McCarrick and Bernardin had sexually assaulted him when he was 18 years old at a house near Geneva Lake in Wisconsin.

Author George Weigel has been a severe critic of Bernardin and his influence in the Catholic Church in the United States. Weigel accused Bernardin of creating a "Bernardin Machine" to appoint bishops that dominated the American hierarchy for decades, and also of being the exponent of a "culturally accommodating Catholicism". He deemed the defeat of Bishop Gerald Kicanas by then-Archbishop Timothy Dolan for the presidency of the United States Conference of Catholic Bishops, in November 2010, as "the end of the Bernardin era".

== Honors ==
=== Honors received by Bernardin ===
- Honorary decree (1983), College of the Holy Cross in Worcester, Massachusetts
- Doctor of Divinity honorary degree (1983) Yale University, in New Haven, Connecticut.
- F. Sadlier Dinger Award (1989) from the educational publisher William H. Sadlier, Inc. The award is for an outstanding contribution to the ministry of religious education in America.
- Golden Plate Award (1990) of the American Academy of Achievement.
- Laetare Medal (1995) from the University of Notre Dame in recognition of outstanding service to the Catholic Church and society.
- Presidential Medal of Freedom (1996) by US President Bill Clinton
- Order of Lincoln Laureate (1997) The Lincoln Academy of Illinois

=== Places named after him ===
The following places were named after Bernardin:

- Bernardin Center at the Catholic Theological Union in Chicago
- Bernardin Center in Columbia, South Carolina
- Cardinal Joseph Bernardin Catholic School, a regional elementary school in Orland Hills, Illinois
- Cardinal Bernardin Early Childhood Center in Chicago
- Cardinal Bernardin Cancer Center at St. Joseph Health System in Chicago

=== Awards and honors named after him ===
- The University of South Carolina established the annual "Joseph Cardinal Bernardin Lecture" in 1999.
- The Catholic Campaign for Human Development, now sponsored by the US Conference of Catholic Bishops, presents the Cardinal Joseph Bernardin New Leadership Award to a young adult who works against poverty and injustice.
- Georgetown University sponsors the Bernardin Lecture every year
- The Catholic Common Ground Initiative presents the Cardinal Joseph Bernardin Award to a group or individual who works to find common ground within the Catholic Church.

== Views ==
=== Church issues ===
Bernardin became a mediator between the diverging parties in the changing post-conciliar Church. In 1996, Bernardin inaugurated the Catholic Common Ground Initiative and was a co-author of its founding document "Called to Be Catholic: Church in a Time of Peril," released in August 1996.

Bernardin is also noted for his interest in the concerns of young adults, which was in part evidenced by his involvement in the nascent Theology on Tap lecture movement in the early 1980s. In 1985, he told attendees of a special Theology on Tap Mass, "If I had children of my own, they would be your age. You are very special to me and to this Archdiocese."

=== HIV/AIDS ===
In 1985, Bernadin established an AIDS task force to determine how the archdiocese might best care for those stricken by HIV/AIDS. In 1989, he dedicated Bonaventure House with the help of the Alexian Brothers, a residential facility for people suffering with the disease. Bernardin was also lauded for his anti-pornography work, his leadership of the U.S. bishops, and the presidency of the Catholic Church Extension Society.

=== Ecumenicism ===
According to Monsignor Kenneth Velo, a former executive aide to Bernardin and head of the Catholic Extension Society, Bernadin learned ecumenism while serving in predominantly Baptist American South.

Bernardin promoted ecumenism. While archbishop of Cincinnati, Bernardin engaged in interfaith dialogue with Jews, and ecumenical dialogue with Presbyterians, Episcopalians, and Lutherans. In 1984, he began the Council of Religious Leaders of Metropolitan Chicago, the successor group to the Chicago Conference on Religion and Race, and served as the council's first president. Under Bernardin, the Archdiocese of Chicago established covenants with the Episcopal Diocese of Chicago in 1986 and with the Metropolitan Synod of the Evangelical Lutheran Church in America in 1989. Bernardin attended the World Parliament of Religions in Chicago in 1993.

=== Peace ===
In 1981, Bernardin became head of the new NCCB Ad Hoc Committee on War and Peace, formed to draft a pastoral letter on nuclear proliferation. The resulting book-length letter, "The Challenge of Peace: God's Promise and Our Response", was published in 1983. An influential statement of Catholic social teaching, the document condemns nuclear warfare and states that nuclear deterrence is "not an adequate strategy as a long-term basis for peace; it is a transitional strategy justifiable only in conjunction with resolute determination to pursue arms control and disarmament". In relation to his work on the nuclear question, Bernardin was featured on the front cover of a 1982 issue of Time Magazine entitled "God and the Bomb".

In 1995, Bernardin led an interfaith pilgrimage to the Middle East to meet with government and religious leaders in Israel and Palestine and promote peace. Bernardin condemned violence in Lebanon, Israel, and Northern Ireland and called for the Catholic Church to become a "peace church".

== See also ==
- Catholic Church in the United States
- Historical list of the Catholic bishops of the United States
- Italians in Chicago
- List of Catholic bishops of the United States
- Lists of patriarchs, archbishops, and bishops

== Sources ==
- Millies, Steven P. Joseph Bernardin: Seeking Common Ground, Liturgical Press, 2016. ISBN 978-0-8146-4831-5.
- Bernardin, Joseph. The Gift of Peace: Personal Reflection, Doubleday, 1998. ISBN 978-0-385-49434-2.
- Wall, A.E.P. The Spirit of Cardinal Bernardin, Thomas More Press, 1983. ISBN 0-88347-156-6. Thomas More Press, 1997. ISBN 0-88347-379-8.
- Spilly, Alphonse P. (2000). Selected Works of Joseph Cardinal Bernardin: Church and society. Liturgical Press. p. 692. ISBN 9780814625842.
- Bernardin, Joseph (1998). Langan, John (ed.). A Moral Vision for America. Georgetown University Press. ISBN 9780878406760.

Catholic Church titles
Preceded by John Krol	President of the United States Catholic Conference and National Conference of Catholic Bishops; 1974–1977	Succeeded by John R. Quinn
Preceded by Paul Francis Leibold	Archbishop of Cincinnati; 1972–1982	Succeeded by Daniel Edward Pilarczyk
Preceded by John Cody	Archbishop of Chicago; 1982–1996	Succeeded by Francis George
