= Holy Name Cathedral (Chicago) =

Catholic cathedral in Chicago

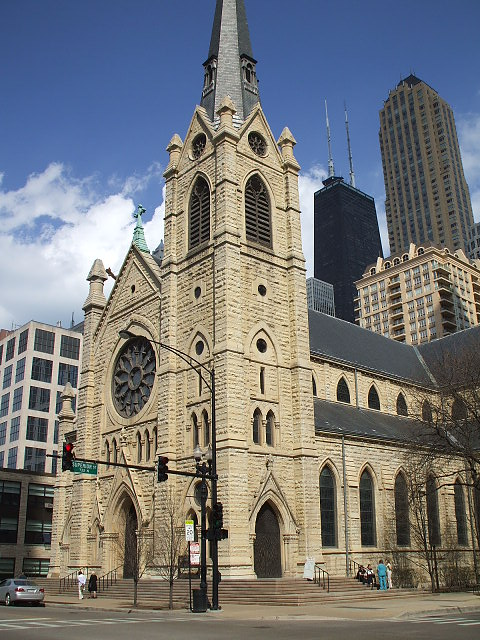
- View of the cathedral from State Street, 2007
- Holy Name Cathedral
- Location: 730 North Wabash Avenue; Chicago, Illinois
- Country: United States
- Denomination: Catholic Church
- Sui iuris church: Latin Church
- Website: holynamecathedral.org

History
- Status: Cathedral
- Founded: 1843 (parish)
- Dedicated: November 21, 1875 by Bishop Thomas Foley

Architecture
- Functional status: Active
- Heritage designation: NRHP
- Designated: 2000
- Architect: Patrick Keely et al.
- Style: Gothic Revival
- Groundbreaking: July 19, 1874

Administration
- Province: Chicago
- Archdiocese: Chicago
- Parish: Holy Name

Clergy
- Archbishop: Cardinal Blase J. Cupich
- Rector: Very. Rev. Gregory Sakowicz
- Holy Name Cathedral
- U.S. National Register of Historic Places
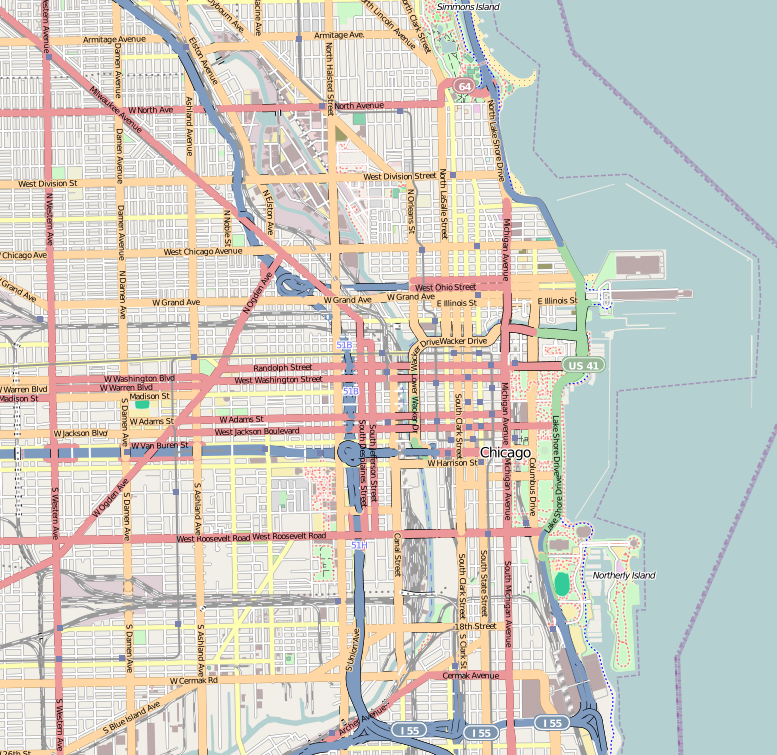
- Location within Central Chicago
- Location: 735 North State Street, Chicago, Illinois
- Coordinates: 41°53′45″N 87°37′39″W
- Built: 1874
- Architect: Patrick Keely; Henry Schlacks; Charles Murphy; Joseph McCarthy
- Architectural style: Gothic
- NRHP reference No.: 00000477
- Added to NRHP: May 25, 2000

Holy Name Cathedral in Chicago is the cathedral of the Archdiocese of Chicago, one of the largest Catholic dioceses in the United States. The church serves as the episcopal church of the Archbishop of Chicago, Cardinal Blase J. Cupich. It seats 1,100 people.

Dedicated on November 21, 1875, Holy Name Cathedral replaced the Cathedral of Saint Mary, which was destroyed in the Great Chicago Fire of 1871. The cathedral underwent repairs and renovations in 1888, 1968 and 2008. A fire in 2009 caused major damage to the roof and water damage to interior but the cathedral was repaired that year. During the 1920s, two murders in gang wars likely involving Al Capone occurred outside the cathedral. The viewings of the remains of Cardinals George Mundelein and Joseph Bernardin drew large crowds in 1937 and 1996. Holy Name Cathedral hosted the international eucharistic conference in 1926 and a papal visit by Pope John Paul II in 1979.

Holy Name Cathedral contains massive bronze doors at its main entrance, a large hanging crucifix and the stations of the cross on the walls of the nave. The cathedral has two ambos, each decorated with images of the apostles. The altar podium displays four stories from the Old Testament and the cathedra has panels depicting the Christians teachers. The five sanctuary panels around the cathedra show key moments from the life of Jesus.

== History ==
=== 1843 to 1871 ===
In 1843, Pope Gregory XVI erected the Diocese of Chicago and named Bishop William Quarter as its first bishop. The first cathedral for the new diocese was Saint Mary's Cathedral, located in what is today the Loop District of the city. By the end of the 1860's, the diocese start planning to convert Holy Name Church in Chicago into a larger, more modern cathedral.

In October 1871, Saint Mary's was destroyed during the Great Chicago Fire. Immediately after the fire, the diocese purchased a wooden house on Cass Street to serve as an interim facility. It was soon named the shanty cathedral. Bishop Thomas P. Foley and several of his priests starting traveling around the United States and Europe in 1872, fundraising for a new cathedral. That same year, the diocese purchased the Plymouth Congregational Church in Chicago to replace the shanty cathedral and serve as a temporary pro-cathedral.

=== 1871 to 1900 ===
By 1874, Foley was ready to start construction of the new cathedral. In February 1874, he hired Patrick Charles Keely, an architect from Brooklyn, New York, with extensive experience designing Catholic churches. After a funding delay, Foley laid the cornerstone for the new structure on July 19, 1874. Foley dedicated the Cathedral of the Holy Name on November 21, 1875, constructed for a total cost of $260,000, equivalent to $7,623,000 in 2025. In 1882, the archdiocese added a rectory to the structure.

In 1888, surveyors noticed that Holy Name was sagging on its Superior Street side, a defect from its quick construction. Archbishop Patrick Feehan of what was now the Archdiocese of Chicago ordered an immediate remediation of the problem. In 1915, the archdiocese divided the sanctuary into two sections and lengthened it by 15 feet (4.6 m) to accommodate more seating. That same year, Archbishop James Edward Quigley died. The first major mass of the newly rededicated Holy Name was his funeral.

=== 1900 to 1960 ===
Archbishop George Mundelein in March 1924 was elevated to the College of Cardinals by Pope Pius XI. When Mundelein returned to Chicago from Rome, he was greeted at Holy Name Cathedral by a procession of over 80,000 people. During the early 1920's, Chicago bootlegger Dion O'Banion, head of the North Side Gang, operated the Schofield Flower Shop across from Holy Name. In November 1924, gunmen acting on orders from mob boss Al Capone murdered O'Banion in his shop. The archdiocese denied a request by O'Banion's family for a funeral mass at Holy Name.

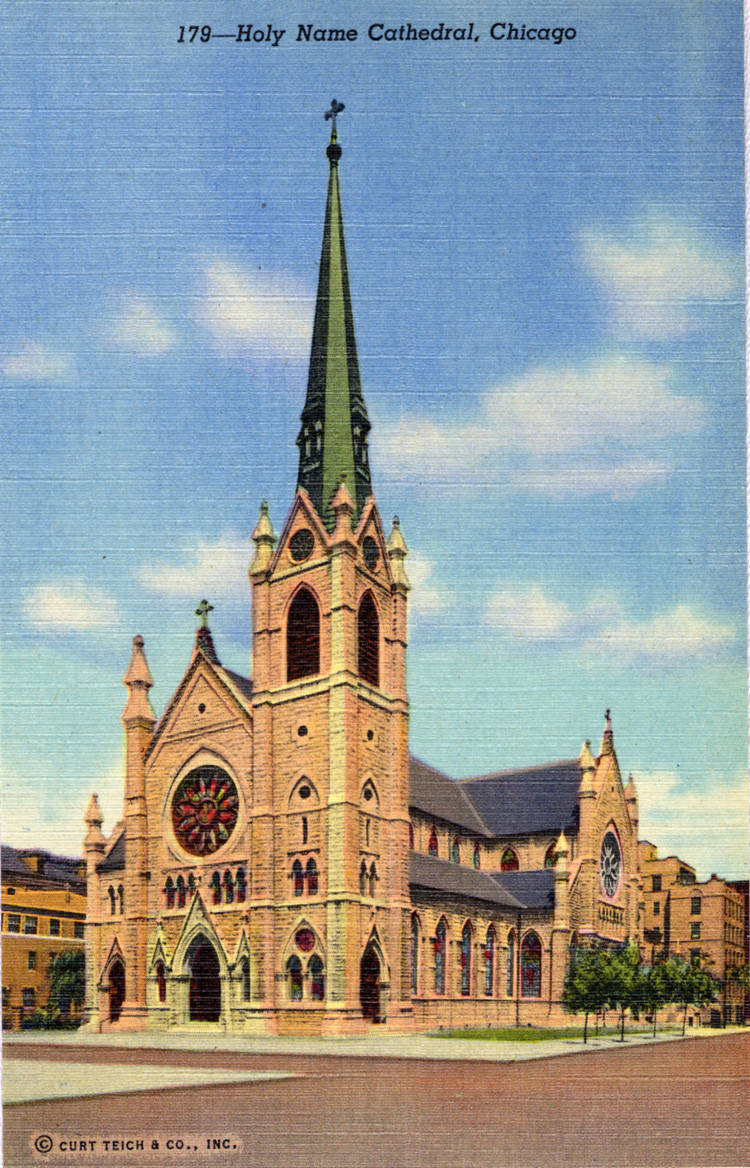
Holy Name Cathedral (1941)

In June 1926, Chicago hosted the 28th International Eucharistic Congress, bringing in clergy from around the world. The opening mass was celebrated at Holy Name. October 1926 saw the assassination of North Side gang leader Hymie Weiss outside the flower shop, hit by two snipers. Some of the bullets hit the cathedral. Weiss was administered last rites on the cathedral steps by a priest. Like O'Banion, Weiss was denied a cathedral service. The archdiocese in 1929 replaced the old rectory with a six-story building. The Little Sisters of Holy Family in Sherbrooke, Quebec, sent a contingent sisters to take over housekeeping at the cathedral.

The Holy Name Academy opened on the cathedral grounds in 1937. When Mundelein died in October 1939, the archdiocese planned for him to lie in state at Holy Name. The City of Chicago was forced to quickly pave State Street, torn up for subway construction. Mundelein lay in state in the cathedral nave; over a million people paid their last respects to him.

=== 1960 to 2000 ===
In 1961, the archdiocese constructed a new convent building for the sisters stationed at the cathedral. A new school auditorium opened in 1962. In April 1968, after discovering an unsafe structure in the cathedral, the archdiocese closed it for repairs. They decided at that time to make necessary renovations so that the cathedral conformed to liturgical changes from the Second Vatican Council.

Before starting the renovations, contractors removed all the stained glass, paintings, and statuary from the cathedral interior. The result was a relatively plain room, dominated by a six-ton granite altar and Resurrection crucifix. On December 24, 1969, Holy Name reopened.

In October 1979, Pope John Paul II became the first pope to visit Holy Name Cathedral. He attended two evening prayer services there, with one session featuring the tenor Luciano Pavarotti with the Chicago Symphony Orchestra. The congregation also prayed the Our Father in Latin at John Paul's request. The sanctuary organ was installed in the south chancel in 1981 and the gallery organ in 1989.

The Holy Name High School closed in 1994. When Cardinal Joseph Bernadin died in 1996, he lay in state in Holy Name before his funeral. The line of people waiting to pay their respects for him snaked along Chicago Avenue, the largest crowd since the death of Mundelein in 1939. The next year, the archdiocese enlarged the Cardinal Bernardin Parish Center on the cathedral campus, adding new offices, classrooms and a gym.

=== 2000 to present ===
In February 2008, the first of several large wooden pieces fell off the ceiling onto the floor. After inspecting the ceiling, the archdiocese closed Holy Name for emergency repairs. During this closure, they also restored all 32 columns that support the nave ceiling. The cathedral fully reopened in November 2008.

Holy Name was forced to close again in February 2009 due to a fire in the cathedral attic. When the fire was discovered, Reverend Matthew Compton evacuated the rectory to help evacuate, then rescued the Blessed Sacrament from the sanctuary with the aid of a fire department chaplain. Firefighters entered the attic without their helmets and oxygen tanks and quickly extinguished the blaze, saving the structure. The fire department later determined that a faulty ice melting system in the roof line of the cathedral caused the fire.. The building suffered minimal fire and smoke damage, but extensive water damage. The Daprato Rigali Studios in Chicago performed the restoration work. Holy Name Cathedral reopened in August 2009.

The archdiocese in 2021 sold the cathedral parking lot to real estate developers, who then built One Chicago, a skyscraper mixed development building. In 2024, the archdiocese celebrated 175th anniversary of the dedication of Holy Name with two special liturgies and announced a year long celebration of the event. The Chicago City Council also declared November 18, 2024, to be Holy Name Cathedral Day.

== Architecture and furnishings ==
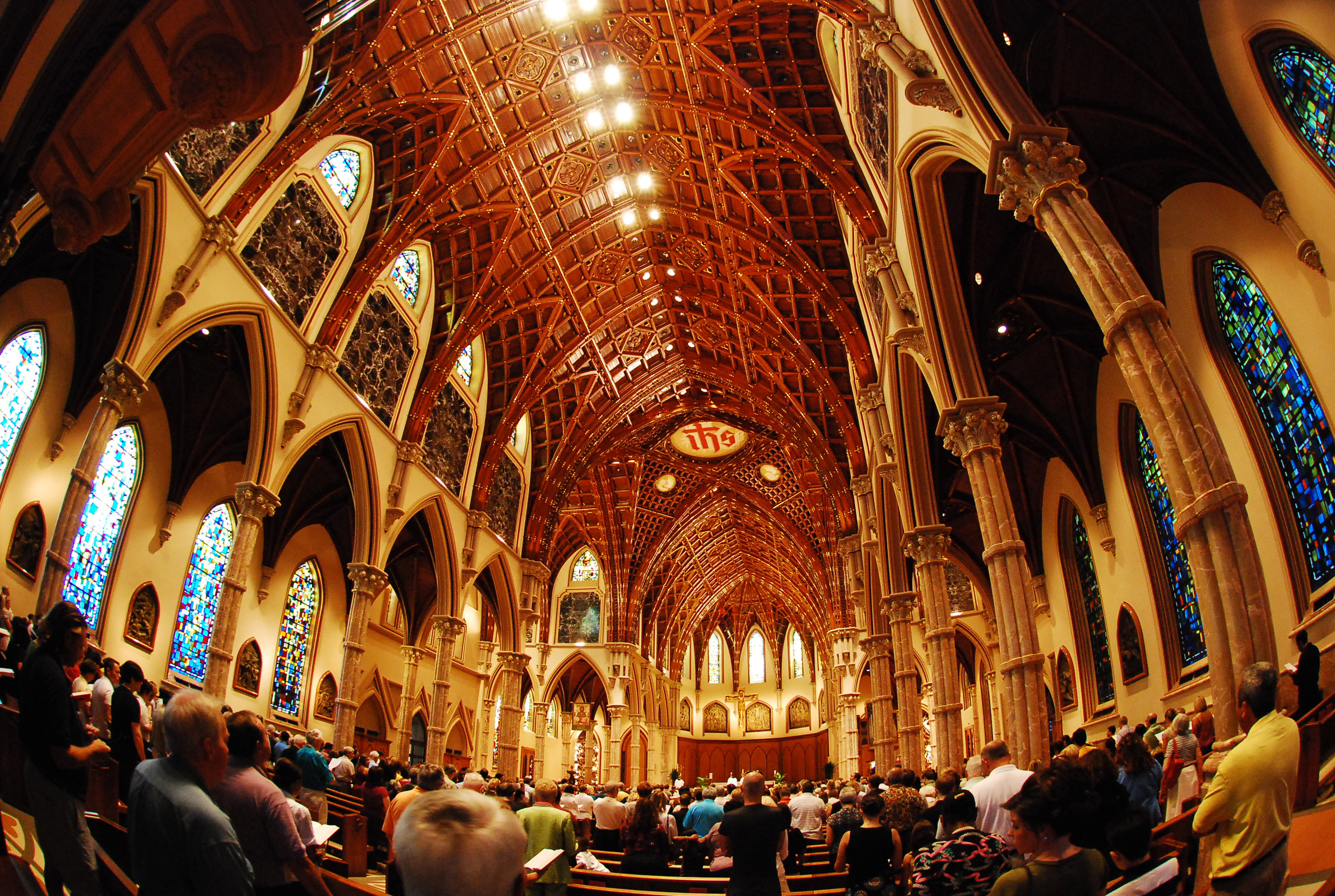
Cathedral nave (2009)

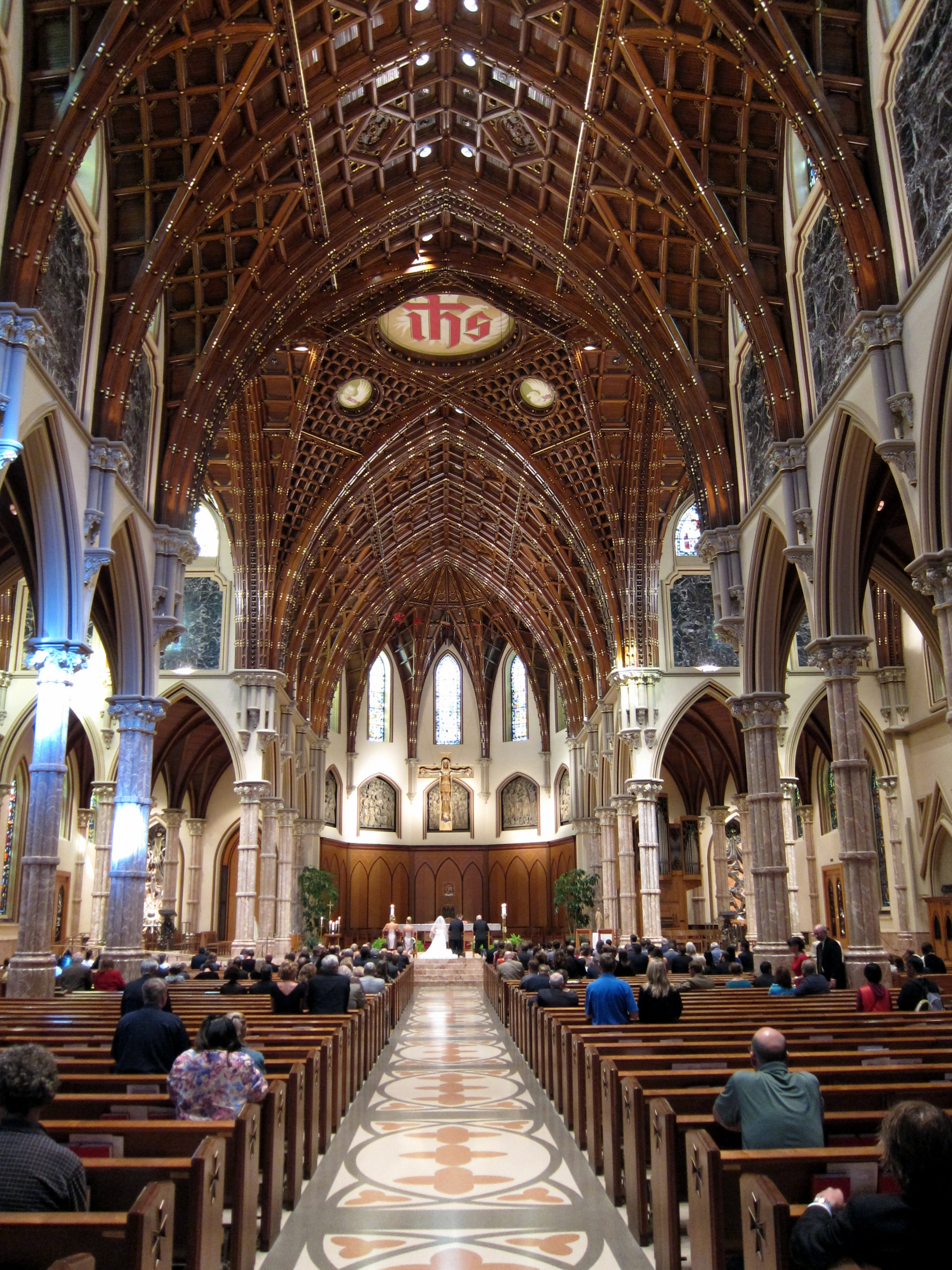
Cathedral nave (2012)

Holy Name Cathedral was built in the Gothic Revival architectural style while at the same time integrating motifs symbolic of the message of the modern Catholic Church. The cathedral is 233 feet (71 m) long, 126 feet (38 m) wide, with a seating capacity of 1,110 people. The ceiling is 70 feet (21 m) high and has a spire that reaches 210 feet (64 m) into the sky.

=== Bronze cathedral doors ===
The front entrance of Holy Name contains massive bronze doors that weigh 1,200 pounds (540 kg) each. However, a hydraulic system allows visitors to open the doors with minimal effort. Beyond the doors is a vestibule encased in glass. Designed by American artist Albert J. Friscia, the doors introduce the overall "Tree of Life" theme, containing intricate details that make them look like planks of wood.

=== Resurrection crucifix ===
The nave of Holy Name contains the suspended Resurrection Crucifix, sculpted by the Italian artist Ivo Demetz. The nave walls display the Stations of the Cross by Italian artist Goffredo Verginelli. These are the Passion, the Crucifixion and the Resurrection of Christ. The stations are cast in bronze and framed in red Rocco Alicante marble.

=== Ambo of the Evangelists ===
The Ambo of the Evangelists, one of two ambos in Holy Name, was designed by the Italian sculptor Eugenio de Courten. It depicts the authors of the Gospels with their symbols. An ambo is the lectern used for readings of Holy Scripture. The bronze casting depicts:

- Matthew (angel) representing the gospel of Christ
- Mark (lion) for inspiration for Peter's teachings or catechesis
- Luke (ox) for his recounting of Christ's infancy
- John (eagle) for the writer of the Spiritual Gospel, recounting the story of "the Word made flesh."

=== Ambo of the Epistle Writers ===
The Ambo of the Epistle Writers, the second ambo in Holy Name, was also created by de Courten. It is used by lectors and cantors during Sunday masses and other special feasts and memorials. The ambo is a bronze casting that depicts the authors of the apostolic letters to the early Christian communities:

- Peter with keys to the Kingdom of God
- Paul, who died by the sword
- James, representing faith sustained by good works
- Jude, carrying a whip that represents correction

=== Cathedral altar ===
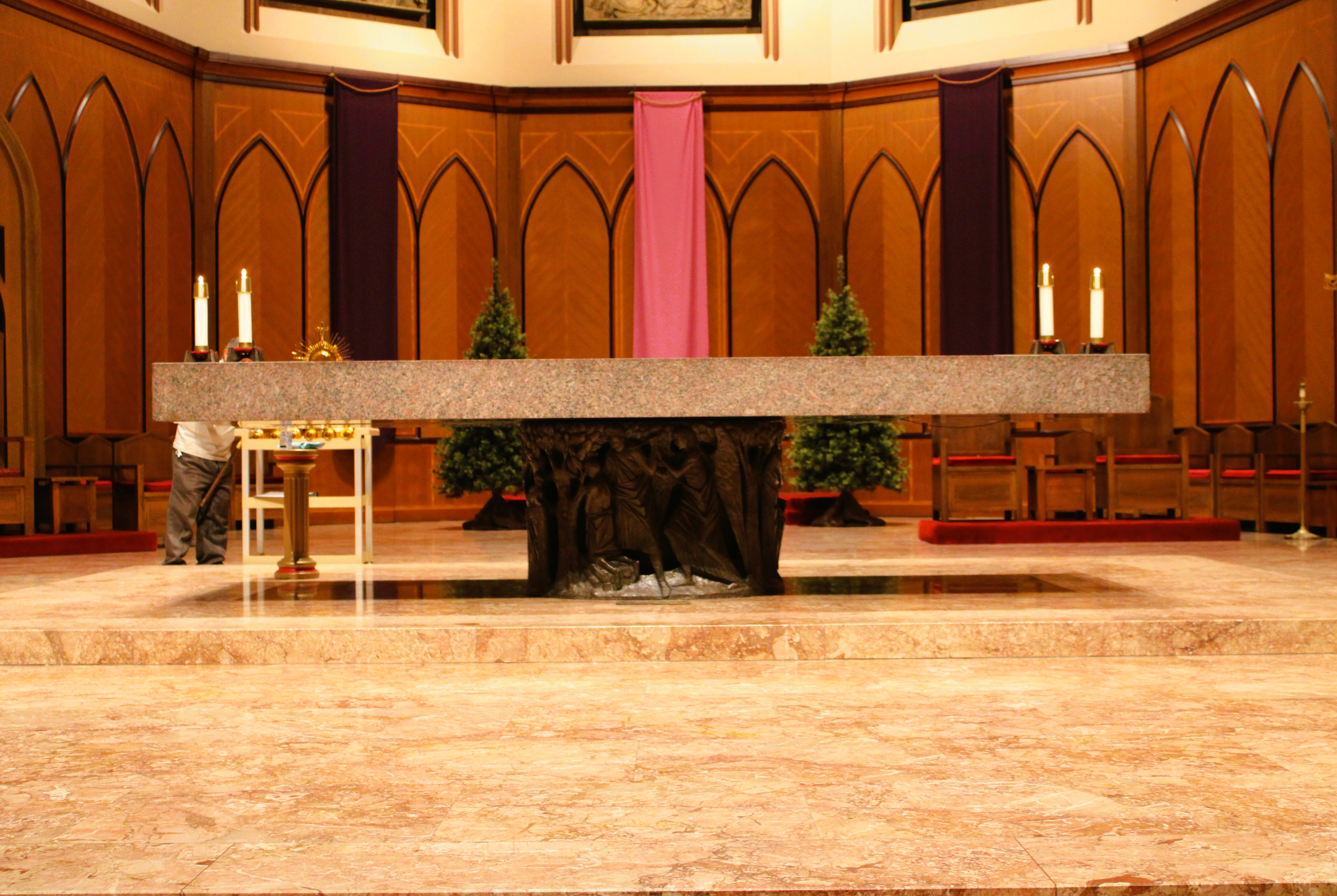
Cathedral altar (2023)

Six tons of monolithic red-black Rosso Imperiale di Solberga granite forms the mensa, or table top, of the altar. The altar contains relics, or actual artifacts, from the bodies of Saint John the Apostle and Saint Timothy. The pedestal of the altar is encircled by a bronze bas-relief depicting stories from the Old Testament:

- Abel offering the first sacrifice to God
- Melchizedek the priest giving bread and wine
- Abraham ready to sacrifice his son Isaac
- Elijah receiving bread and water from the Angel of the Lord.

=== Cathedra of the See of Chicago ===
A cathedra, or bishop's throne, is what makes the church a cathedral. It is from this chair that Sedes Chicagiensis, or the See of Chicago, is presided over by the archbishop of Chicago. Unlike most Roman Catholic cathedra, the Cathedra of the See of Chicago is plain and simple. Its back contains three panels depicting the first Christian teachers: Christ in the center panel, Saint Peter to his right, and Saint Paul to his left.

=== Sanctuary Panels of the Holy Name ===
Located around cathedra are the five sanctuary panels of the Holy Name. These bronze panels. created by Attilio Selva. represent the Holy Name of Jesus.

- Infant Savior, with Simeon contemplating the baby Jesus, whom Mary presents in the Temple in Jerusalem.
- Mystery of the Trinity, with an angel carrying the monogram of Christ to earth.
- Risen Christ, showing Christ proclaimed as Lord
- Presentation of Jesus in the Temple, depicting Mary and Joseph presenting the baby Jesus for circumcision and naming in the temple.
- Priesthood of Jesus. It shows Christ adorned in vestments presenting the chalice to all people.

=== Pipe organs ===
The cathedral contains two pipe organs: a large 71-stop, 4-manual instrument in the west end gallery constructed by Flentrop Orgelbouw of Zaandam, Netherlands; and a smaller 19-stop, 2-manual instrument in the south chancel by Casavant Frères of Saint-Hyacinthe, Quebec, Canada.

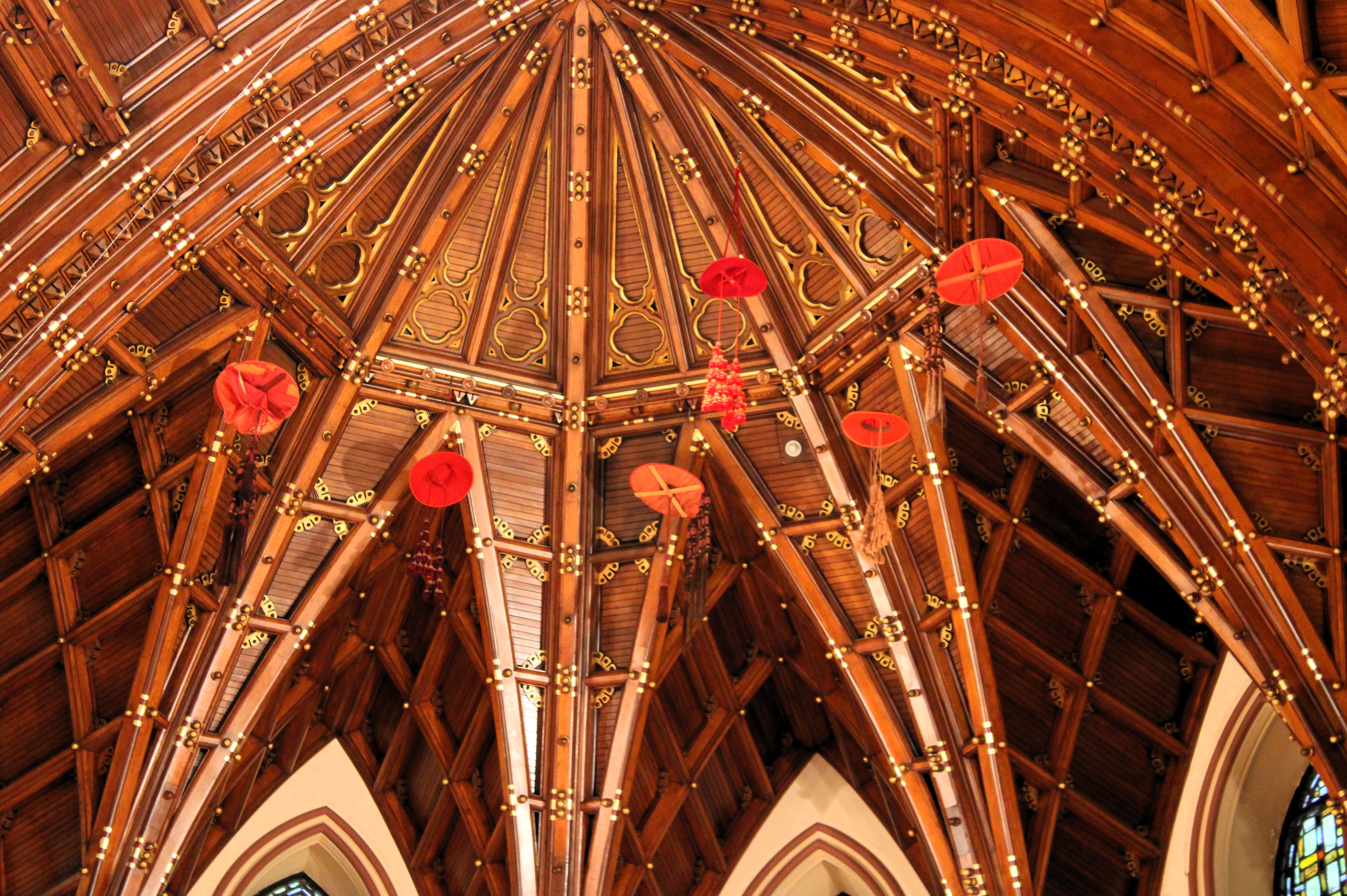
Cathedral Galeri (2023)

=== Galeri of the Cardinals ===
Holy Name Cathedral continues the tradition of raising the galero, a wide-brimmed tasseled hat, of a deceased cardinal over the cathedra from the highest point of the semicircular, domed cathedral apse. The galero is hung in Holy Name Cathedral where it remains until it is reduced to dust, symbolizing how all earthly glory is passing. Looking up above the cathedra are the galeri of cardinals George Mundelein, Samuel Stritch, Albert Gregory Meyer, John Cody, Joseph Bernardin, and Francis George.

== See also ==
- List of Catholic cathedrals in the United States
- List of cathedrals in the United States
- Roman Catholic Archdiocese of Chicago
