= John Cody =

American bishop and cardinal

His Eminence John Patrick Cody
- Cardinal, Archbishop of Chicago
- See: Chicago
- Appointed: June 14, 1965
- Installed: August 24, 1965
- Term ended: April 25, 1982
- Predecessor: Albert Gregory Meyer
- Successor: Joseph Bernardin
- Other post: Cardinal-Priest of Santa Cecilia in Trastevere
- Previous posts: Archbishop of New Orleans (1964–1965); Apostolic Administrator of New Orleans (1962–1964); Coadjutor Archbishop of New Orleans (1961–1964); Bishop of Kansas City–Saint Joseph (1956–1961); Coadjutor Bishop of Kansas City–Saint Joseph (August 1956 – September 1956); Coadjutor Bishop of Kansas City (1954–1956); Auxiliary Bishop of St. Louis (1947–1954)

Orders
- Ordination: December 8, 1931 by Francesco Marchetti-Selvaggiani
- Consecration: July 2, 1947 by Joseph Ritter
- Created cardinal: June 26, 1967 by Paul VI

Personal details
- Born: December 24, 1907 St. Louis, Missouri
- Died: April 25, 1982 (aged 74) Chicago, Illinois
- Motto: MAGNIFICAT ANIMA MEA (MY SOUL DOTH MAGNIFY)
- Coat of arms: John Patrick Cody's coat of arms

Styles of John Cody
- Reference style: His Eminence
- Spoken style: Your Eminence
- Informal style: Cardinal
- See: Chicago

Ordination history of John Cody
History
Episcopal consecration
- Consecrated by: Joseph Ritter (St. Louis)
- Date: July 2, 1947
Cardinalate
- Elevated by: Pope Paul VI
- Date: 26 June 1967
Episcopal succession
Bishops consecrated by John Cody as principal consecrator
- Mário Roberto Emmett Anglim, C.Ss.R.: June 2, 1966
- Juan Conway McNabb, O.S.A.: June 17, 1967
- Michael James Dempsey, O.P.: August 15, 1967
- Thomas Joseph Grady: August 24, 1967
- John L. May: August 24, 1967
- William Edward McManus: August 24, 1967
- Raymond James Vonesh: April 3, 1968
- Alfred Leo Abramowicz: June 13, 1968
- Michael Dempsey: June 13, 1968
- Edward William O'Rourke: July 15, 1971

John Patrick Cody (December 24, 1907 – April 25, 1982) was an American Catholic prelate who served as Bishop of Kansas City–Saint Joseph (1956–1961), Archbishop of New Orleans (1964–1965), and Archbishop of Chicago (1965–1982). He was named a cardinal in 1967.

== Biography ==
=== Early life and education ===
John Cody was born in St. Louis, Missouri, to Thomas Joseph and Mary (née Begley) Cody. His father was an Irish immigrant who became deputy chief of the St Louis Fire Department. After attending Holy Rosary Parochial School, he entered St. Louis Preparatory Seminary at age 13. He remained at St. Louis until 1926, when he was sent to continue his studies at the Pontifical North American College in Rome. He earned a Doctor of Philosophy degree (1928) and a Doctor of Sacred Theology (1932) from the College of the Propagation of the Faith.

=== Priesthood ===
Cody was ordained to the priesthood by Cardinal Francesco Marchetti Selvaggiani on December 8, 1931. He remained in Rome for the next six years as a staff member of the North American College and an official of the Vatican Secretariat of State. In 1938, he earned a Doctor of Canon Law degree from the Pontifical Roman Athenaeum S. Apollinare, and was awarded the Benemerenti medal for his services to the Secretariat of State. Upon his return to the United States, Cody served as private secretary to Archbishop of St. Louis John J. Glennon until 1940, when he became chancellor of the Archdiocese of St. Louis. Cody was named a privy chamberlain in 1939 and a domestic prelate in 1946. He accompanied Archbishop Glennon to Rome in 1946 when the latter was named a cardinal, and was on hand when Glennon died in Ireland on the return trip.

=== Episcopacy ===
On May 10, 1947, Cody was appointed Auxiliary Bishop of St. Louis and Titular Bishop of Apollonia by Pope Pius XII. He received his episcopal consecration on the following July 2 from Archbishop Joseph Ritter, with bishops George Joseph Donnelly and Vincent Stanislaus Waters serving as co-consecrators, at the Cathedral of St. Louis. He was appointed coadjutor to the Bishop of Saint Joseph, Missouri, on January 27, 1954. He was appointed Bishop of Kansas City–Saint Joseph, Missouri, on August 29, 1956, and installed October 11, 1956. In 1961, he was transferred to New Orleans, Louisiana, where he was appointed coadjutor to the archbishop on August 14, 1961, appointed apostolic administrator on June 1, 1962, and acceded to the See of New Orleans on November 8, 1964.

According to James Ralph, he became an object of national attention as archbishop, due to his predecessor Joseph Rummel's efforts to desegregate the Catholic schools in the archdiocese. As the coadjutor archbishop and then archbishop of New Orleans, Cody had directed the desegregation of New Orleans's parochial schools. Cody's actions had generated fierce opposition, but he had not flinched under pressure. Cody was quoted as saying, "The Church's role will be most important and It is definitely felt by many experts in the field of community relations that the Catholic Church will continue to be one of the most potent influences in bringing about racial understanding and brotherly love among all races. This was one of the salient points in the encyclical, "Pacem in Terris.” The ecumenical council, showing to the world the spirit of unity and harmony among all Catholics, has been felt appreciably in the present racial crisis in our country. Through its schools and institutions of higher learning, most of which have become fully integrated. the Church can contribute greatly to the development and understanding among all people in the South." Upon the cities construction projects for integrated schools; "The construction of these schools has helped considerably in bringing an acceptance of the Catholic Church's teaching on the equality of all men."

=== Archbishop of Chicago ===
==== Mismanagement ====
Cody was appointed Archbishop of Chicago on June 14, 1965, and installed August 24, 1965. He was elevated to cardinal on June 26, 1967. Cody's time in Chicago was marked by strife and controversy, including federal investigations of financial improprieties and an ambiguous relationship with Helen Dolan Wilson, who was alleged to be his mistress. Wilson, who "followed (Cody's) every move" for a period of some 25 years, was alleged to have received large sums of money diverted by Cody, some of which were used to purchase "a house in Boca Raton ... a luxury car, expensive clothes and furs, and holiday cash presents."

Despite the fact that approximately $1 million of Church funds disappeared under Cody's tenure, and the National Conference of Catholic Bishops lost more than $4 million in a single year while Cody was treasurer of that organization, all investigations were suspended upon Cody's death.

Roy Larsen, the religion editor of the Chicago Sun-Times wrote:

"Legally, the investigations by the paper and the federal prosecutors ended inconclusively. In that sense, the legal tactics followed by Cody and his lawyers--chiefly a strategy of delays and stalling--succeeded in preventing any indictments. Eight months before the first story was published, the US Attorney's office issued subpoenas to Cody and the archdiocese, but the information that was sought was never turned over to the government. Even after the series was published, the stonewalling continued. A new US Attorney, Dan Webb, had taken over the investigation and issued new subpoenas, but Frank McGarr, the chief judge of the US District Court for the Northern District of Illinois, did nothing to move the case along. Finally, the Cardinal's health became an issue. On April 25, 1982, he died, and in July 1982, Webb terminated the investigation, stating: "Once the cardinal passed on, the investigation as to the allegations against the cardinal became moot."

Cody often found his view of episcopal authority in conflict with a number of priests of his diocese. He was opposed to some of the decisions of Apostolic Delegate Jean Jadot and led a protest campaign against what he felt was his excessive progressivism and radicalism.

After the first meeting between Church and Freemasonry which had been held on 11 April 1969 at the convent of the Divine Master in Ariccia, Cody was the protagonist of a series of public handshakes between high prelates of the Roman Catholic Church and the heads of Freemasonry.

==== Relationship with the Black Community ====
Cody butted heads with Fr George Clements for similar reasons, as local Black Catholics sought more Black representation in the local pastorate, especially at Black parishes. Cody circumvented requests for Clements to be named pastor of his parish by placing a different Black priest as pastor there, a pastorally inexperienced Fr Rollins Lambert. He thought he would appease the community since he appointed a Black priest, but they were frustrated with an explicit attempt to avoid appointing a well known Black activist. A series of racially-charged town hall meetings that followed eventually resulted in Fr Lambert opposing Cody's leadership—agreeing with Clements and others that he was a (perhaps unintentional) "racist"—and requesting for Clements to be made pastor. Cody eventually conceded.

The desire for (and often "ask questions later" nature of) inculturation by these same Black Catholics also aggravated Cody, who opposed many of the desired (and sometimes brazenly implemented) changes. In one instance, Clements replaced a statue at his parish of St Anthony of Padua with an altar to Martin Luther King Jr., which Clements attempted to justify by using the concept of popular acclaim. Cody did not budge and threatened to withdraw archdiocesan funds from the parish if the St Anthony statue was not returned to its place. Clements, a close friend of many Black Panthers (including Fred Hampton, his personal mentee), informed Cody he would have to come do it himself, but that he (Clements) would not be able to protect him if he did so. The statue remained elsewhere. Eventually Cody did withdraw financial support from Clements' parish and they operated for a time via fundraisers and special appeals.

==== Civil rights and the FBI ====
The Federal Bureau of Investigation maintained a file on Cody, due to his prominence in Chicago during the civil rights movement. The FBI, which worked to surveil and subvert various aspects of the movement, interviewed Cody on at least one occasion. The resulting file noted Cody's opposition to some priests in his archdiocese because of their strong advocacy on African-American issues, and the file also notes Cody's low opinion of Martin Luther King Jr., who had visited Cody some years prior.

=== Later life and death ===
The opposition to Cody's leadership waned as his health declined in the early 1980s. He was succeeded in the summer of 1982 by the markedly progressive Joseph Bernardin. Cody died of a heart attack that year at the age of 74 and was interred in the Bishops' Mausoleum at Mount Carmel Cemetery in Hillside, Illinois.

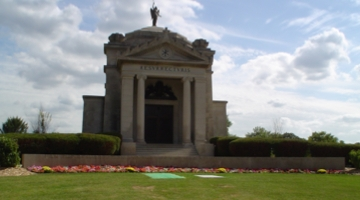
Cardinal Cody's final resting place

Catholic Church titles
Preceded by Albert Gregory Meyer	Archbishop of Chicago; 1965–1982	Succeeded by Joseph Bernadin
Vacant Title last held by Albert Gregory Meyer	Cardinal-Priest of Santa Cecilia in Trastevere; 1967–1982	Vacant Title next held by Carlo Maria Martini
Preceded by Joseph Rummel	Archbishop of New Orleans; 1964–1965	Succeeded by Philip Hannan
Preceded by Edwin Vincent O'Hara	Bishop of Kansas City–Saint Joseph; 1956–1961	Succeeded by Charles Herman Helmsing
