= Alfred Leo Abramowicz =

American bishop (1919–1999)

His Excellency, The Most Reverend Alfred Leo Abramowicz
- Auxiliary Bishop of Chicago
- Church: Catholic Church
- See: Titular See of Pesto

Orders
- Ordination: May 1, 1943 by Samuel Alphonsus Stritch
- Consecration: June 13, 1968 by John Cody

Personal details
- Born: January 27, 1919 Chicago, Illinois, US
- Died: September 12, 1999 (aged 80) Chicago
- Education: Archbishop Quigley Preparatory Seminary; University of St. Mary of the Lake; Pontifical Gregorian University
- Motto: Caritas Christi urset me (The love of Christ bears me)

Alfred Leo Abramowicz (January 27, 1919 – September 12, 1999) was an American prelate in the Roman Catholic Church. He served as an auxiliary bishop for the Archdiocese of Chicago in Illinois from 1968 to 1995.

Abramowicz was a strong advocate for Polish-Americans in the United States, the Catholic Church in Poland, and the Solidarity labor movement in Poland.

== Biography ==
=== Early life ===
Abramowicz was born in Chicago on January 27, 1919, the son of Polish immigrants. He first attended Archbishop Quigley Preparatory Seminary in Chicago, then studied at the University of St. Mary of the Lake in Mundelein, Illinois.

=== Priesthood ===
Abramowicz was ordained a priest by Cardinal Samuel Stritch for the Archdiocese of Chicago in Chicago on May 1, 1943. After his ordination, Abramowicz was assigned as assistant pastor to Immaculate Conception Parish in South Chicago. In 1948, he was transferred to St. Helens Parish in Chicago. In 1949, he went to Rome to studied at the Pontifical Gregorian University, earning a Licentiate of Canon Law in 1952.

After returning to Chicago, Abramowicz became the resident priest at Holy Name Cathedral Parish. He was also appointed to the Marriage Tribunal for the archdiocese. In 1960, he was named executive director of the Catholic League for Religious Assistance to Poland, working as a principal US fund-raising and organizational contact for the Catholic Church in Poland and for the Polish Solidarity movement. In 1966, Pope Paul VI named him as a papal chamberlain with the title of monsignor. Abramowicz became a consultant to the archdiocese in 1968.

=== Auxiliary Bishop of Chicago ===
On May 8, 1968, Pope Paul VI appointed Abramowicz as an auxiliary bishop of the Archdiocese of Chicago and titular bishop of Pesto. He was consecrated on June 13, 1968, by Cardinal John Cody in the Sacred Heart Chapel at Archbishop Quigley Preparatory Seminary South in Chicago. In 1969, Abramowicz arranged the details for the visit of Cardinal Karol Wojtyla, later Pope John Paul II, to the United States. Abramowicz worked with the pontifical Commission for Religious Relations with the Jews and the Polish National Catholic Church, an independent congregation in the United States. He served as judge during the beatification processes for

- Archbishop Jerzy Matulewicz, a Polish prelate of Vilnius, Lithuania
- Theresa Dudzik, the American founder of the Congregation of the Franciscan Sisters of Chicago
- Archbishop Piotr Semenenko, a Polish theologian
- Maria Kaupas, the American founder of Sisters of Saint Casimir

=== Retirement and legacy ===
When Abramowicz turned age 75, he submitted his letter of resignation as auxiliary bishop of the Archdiocese of Chicago to Pope Paul II. The pope accepted his resignation on January 24, 1995. He died of cancer on September 12, 1999, in Chicago.

In 2006, Abramowicz was accused in a lawsuit against the archdiocese of ignoring a sexual abuse accusation against a priest. The plaintiff claimed that he was sexually abused on several occasions as a teenager by Czeslaw Przybylo, a priest at Five Holy Martyrs Parish in Chicago during the late 1980s and early 1990s. When the plaintiff complained to Abramowicz, he dismissed his claims and told the boy to go to confession. In 2008, the archdiocese settled the lawsuit for $1.375 million.

=== Honors ===
- Merit award from the weekly newspaper Polonia
- Spirit of Poland award from the Polish Museum of America in 1988
- Chicago Copernicus Foundation award in 1990
- Order of Merit of the Republic of Poland from the Government of Poland
