= List of Catholic bishops in the United States =

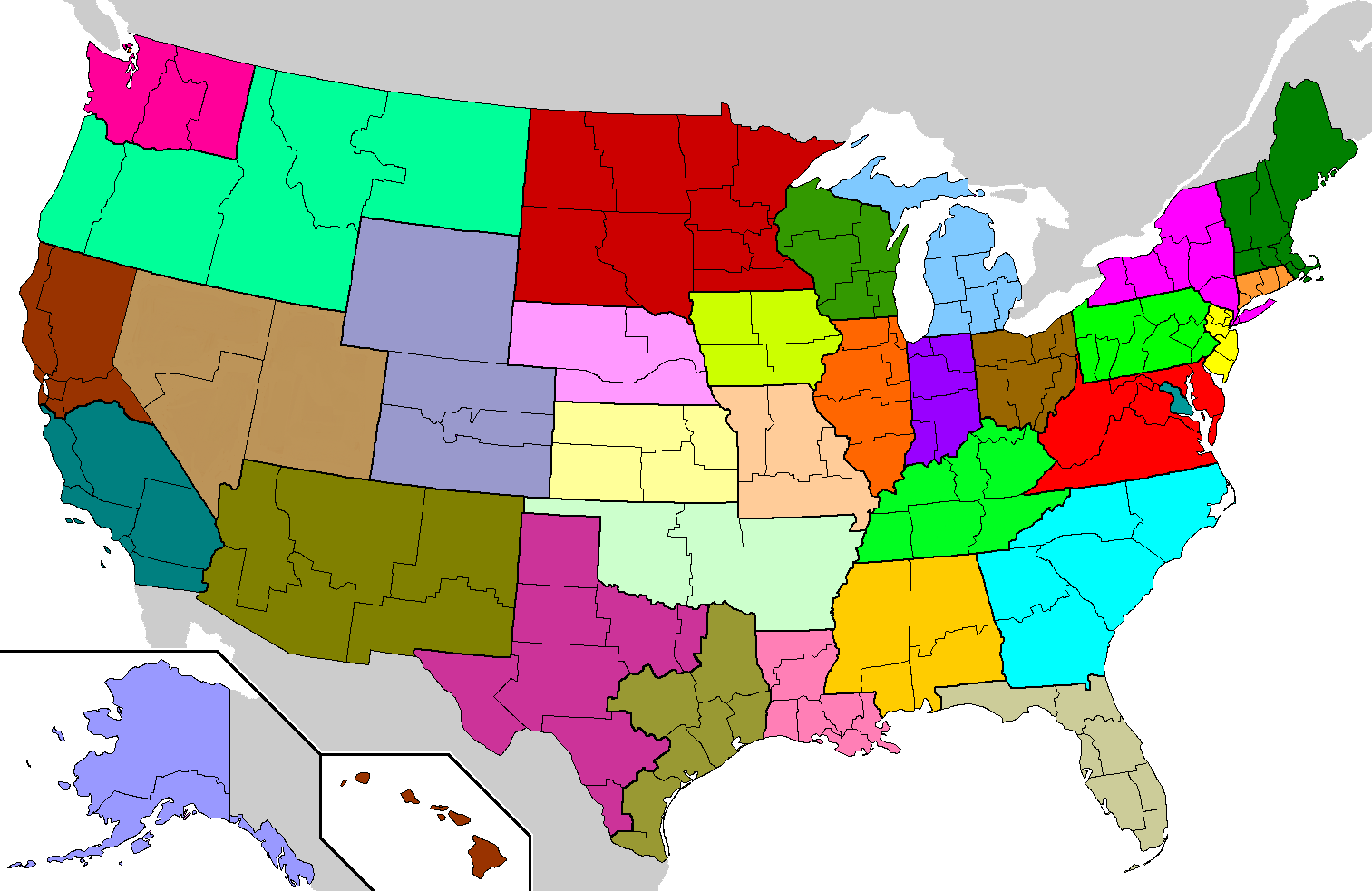
Each color on the map represents an ecclesiastical province. The divisions in each province show the archdiocese and its individual dioceses.

The following is a list of bishops of the Catholic Church in the United States. The list also includes bishops in the American territories of Puerto Rico, the Northern Mariana Islands, American Samoa, Guam, and the U.S. Virgin Islands.

The Catholic Church in the United States comprises:

- 176 Latin Church dioceses in the 50 states, the District of Columbia, and the U.S. Virgin Islands
- 18 Eastern Catholic eparchies in the 50 states
- six Latin Church dioceses in Puerto Rico
- three Latin Church dioceses in American Samoa, Guam, and the Northern Mariana Islands
- the Archdiocese for the Military Services, USA, for American military personnel and their dependents
- the Personal Ordinariate of the Chair of Saint Peter, a special diocese for former Anglicans (Episcopalians) who have been received into the full communion of the Catholic Church

The United States Conference of Catholic Bishops (USCCB) consists of all active and retired bishops—diocesan, coadjutor, and auxiliary—in the fifty states, the District of Columbia, and the U.S. Virgin Islands.

The bishops in the five inhabited territories of the United States are members of different episcopal conferences:

- In Puerto Rico, the diocesan bishops, auxiliary bishop, and bishops emeriti form their own episcopal conference, the Conferencia Episcopal Puertorriqueña.
- In the Northern Mariana Islands, American Samoa, and Guam, the bishops belong to the Episcopal Conference of the Pacific.
- In the U.S. Virgin Islands, the diocesan bishop and bishop emeritus are members of the USCCB.

== Archbishops and bishops ==
The 176 Latin Church dioceses in the United States are divided into 33 ecclesiastical provinces. Each province has a metropolitan archdiocese led by an archbishop, and at least one suffragan diocese. Each suffragan diocese is led by a bishop. The Archdiocese for the Military Services, USA is the only American archdiocese that is not designated as a metropolitan archdiocese. The pope appoints all archbishops and bishops, who must be at least ordained priests. The pope chooses from a list of candidates provided by the papal nuncio of the United States to the Dicastery for Bishops in Rome.

- Most archdioceses and large dioceses have one or more auxiliary bishops, serving under the direction of the archbishop or bishop. After consultation with the Papal Nuncio to the United States, the pope appoints all auxiliary bishops.
- Some archdioceses and dioceses have a coadjutor archbishop or coadjutor bishop. The coadjutor is appointed to assist the diocesan bishop with his administrative duties—due to age or infirmity. After the diocesan bishop retires or dies, the coadjutor automatically succeeds him without an appointment by the pope. The pope appoints all coadjutors.

In some rare cases, the pope will name a titular archbishop as the bishop of a suffragan diocese. The most recent example in the United States was that of Celestine Damiano, whom Pope John XXIII named as bishop of the Diocese of Camden in 1960.

== Foreign-born bishops serving in the United States ==
In most nations that have a large Catholic population and are located in non-missionary geographical areas, the bishops are usually appointed from that country's native-born priests. An exception to this rule is the United States, which has a significant number of foreign-born bishops, with most serving as auxiliary bishops in culturally diverse dioceses. As of 2025, forty-one active foreign-born bishops are serving in the United States, representing about 14% of all active American bishops. Out of twenty-one active bishops in the State of California, eight (Gomez, Rojas, Pham, Pulido, Ligot, Bersabal, Szkredka, and Bahuth) are foreign-born, representing over 1/3 of active bishops in the State.

The countries with the highest number of foreign-born representation are:

- Nine bishops are from Mexico
- Six are from the Philippines
- Four are from Vietnam
- Three are from Poland
- Two are from Brazil
- Two are from Nicaragua
- Two are from Colombia

The following nations have produced at least one bishop who is serving in the United States: Italy, Nicaragua, Haiti, Ireland, Uganda, Lebanon, Peru, Spain, Cuba, South Africa, Malta, Argentina, El Salvador, and Cameroon.

Two archdioceses (Los Angeles and San Antonio) and twelve dioceses (Charleston, San Diego, Fall River, Las Cruces, Raleigh, Tyler, Wheeling, Houma-Thibodaux, Saint Thomas, Salt Lake City, Monterey (CA) and San Bernardino) are led by a foreign-born archbishop or bishop.

Five archdioceses and one diocese have more than one foreign-born active bishop assigned to them:

- Archdiocese of Chicago: (2) Bishops Fedek and Maldonado
- Archdiocese of Los Angeles: (4) Archbishop Gomez and Bishops Szkredeka, Aclan, and Bahuth
- Archdiocese of Newark: (2) Bishops Cruz and Chau
- Archdiocese of Philadelphia: (2) Archbishop Perez and Bishop Esmilla
- Archdiocese of Washington: (2) Bishops Esposito-Garcia and Menjivar-Ayala
- Diocese of Rockville Centre: (2) Bishops Fernandez and Zglejezewski

Additionally, there are several dozen bishops currently serving in the United States who are first-generation American-born children of immigrant parents.

The majority of Eastern Catholic bishops in the U.S. are foreign-born.

== Archeparchs ==
The United States has two Eastern Catholic metropoliae, each led by a metropolitan archbishop called an archeparch:

- The Ruthenian Greek Catholic Church in the United States has four eparchies, which together constitute a single metropolia — the Metropolis of Pittsburgh. Pittsburgh is the metropolitan see.
- The four Ukrainian Catholic eparchies constitute the second metropolia. Philadelphia is the metropolitan see.

== Popes ==
Pope Leo XIV, born Robert Francis Prevost, is the first American-born pope.

== Cardinals ==
=== Serving in the United States ===
Although the majority (53%) of the United States' Roman Catholic population now live in Western and Southern states, there are no active cardinals west of the Archdiocese of Chicago and none in the Southern States.

As of April 2026, three metropolitan archdioceses are led by a cardinal:

- Blase Cupich – Archdiocese of Chicago
- Joseph Tobin – Archdiocese of Newark
- Robert McElroy – Archdiocese of Washington

Seven archdioceses have a retired archbishop who served as cardinal-archbishop:

- Seán O'Malley – Archdiocese of Boston
- Adam Maida – Archdiocese of Detroit
- Daniel DiNardo – Archdiocese of Galveston-Houston
- Roger Mahony – Archdiocese of Los Angeles
- Timothy Dolan – Archdiocese of New York
- Justin Rigali – Archdiocese of Philadelphia
- Wilton Gregory – Archdiocese of Washington
- Donald Wuerl – Archdiocese of Washington

Three archdioceses have a former archbishop who was created a cardinal after he completed his tenure as diocesan archbishop:

- Edwin O'Brien – Archdiocese of Baltimore
- James Stafford – Archdiocese of Denver
- Raymond Burke – Archdiocese of St. Louis

=== Serving outside the United States ===
Two other American cardinals serve in the Holy See:

- Kevin Farrell − Camerlengo of the Holy Roman Church and prefect of the Dicastery for the Laity, Family and Life
- James Harvey − archpriest of the Basilica of Saint Paul Outside the Walls

== Latin church archbishops and bishops ==
United States Conference of Catholic Bishops

List of living bishops of United States dioceses
Ecclesiastical province map	Archdiocese or diocese	Diocese's coat of arm	Archbishop or bishop	Title	Bishop's coat of arms
=== Ecclesiastical Province of Anchorage–Juneau ===
	Archdiocese of Anchorage-Juneau		Andrew Eugene Bellisario	Archbishop of Anchorage-Juneau	
	Diocese of Fairbanks		Steven Maekawa	Bishop of Fairbanks	
=== Ecclesiastical Province of Atlanta ===
	Archdiocese of Atlanta		Gregory John Hartmayer	Archbishop of Atlanta	
	Archdiocese of Atlanta		Joel Matthias Konzen	Auxiliary Bishop of Atlanta	
	Archdiocese of Atlanta		Bernard Shlesinger	Auxiliary Bishop of Atlanta	
	Archdiocese of Atlanta		John-Nhan Tran	Auxiliary Bishop of Atlanta	
	Diocese of Charleston		Jacques E. Fabre	Bishop of Charleston	
	Diocese of Charlotte		Michael Thomas Martin	Bishop of Charlotte	
	Diocese of Raleigh		Luis Rafael Zarama	Bishop of Raleigh	
	Diocese of Savannah		Stephen D. Parkes	Bishop of Savannah	
=== Ecclesiastical Province of Baltimore ===
	Archdiocese of Baltimore		William Edward Lori	Archbishop of Baltimore	
	Archdiocese of Baltimore		Adam John Parker	Auxiliary Bishop of Baltimore	
	Diocese of Arlington		Michael Francis Burbidge	Bishop of Arlington	
	Diocese of Richmond		Barry Christopher Knestout	Bishop of Richmond	
	Diocese of Wheeling-Charleston		Evelio Menjivar-Ayala	Bishop of Wheeling-Charleston	
	Diocese of Wilmington		William Edward Koenig	Bishop of Wilmington	
=== Ecclesiastical Province of Boston ===
	Archdiocese of Boston		Richard Henning	Archbishop of Boston	
	Archdiocese of Boston		Cristiano Borro Barbosa	Auxiliary Bishop of Boston	
	Archdiocese of Boston		Robert Francis Hennessey	Auxiliary Bishop of Boston	
	Archdiocese of Boston		Robert Philip Reed	Auxiliary Bishop of Boston	
	Archdiocese of Boston		Peter John Uglietto	Auxiliary Bishop of Boston	75
	Diocese of Burlington		John Joseph McDermott	Bishop of Burlington	
	Diocese of Fall River		Edgar Moreira da Cunha	Bishop of Fall River	
	Diocese of Manchester		Peter Anthony Libasci	Bishop of Manchester	
	Diocese of Portland		James T. Ruggieri	Bishop of Portland	
	Diocese of Springfield in Massachusetts		William Draper Byrne	Bishop of Springfield in Massachusetts	
	Diocese of Worcester		Robert Joseph McManus	Bishop of Worcester	
=== Ecclesiastical Province of Chicago ===
	Archdiocese of Chicago		Blase Joseph Cupich	Archbishop of Chicago	
	Archdiocese of Chicago		Mark Andrew Bartosic	Auxiliary Bishop of Chicago	
	Archdiocese of Chicago		Robert Fedek	Auxiliary Bishop of Chicago	
	Archdiocese of Chicago		José Maria Garcia Maldonado	Auxiliary Bishop of Chicago	
	Archdiocese of Chicago		Robert J. Lombardo	Auxiliary Bishop of Chicago	
	Archdiocese of Chicago		Timothy J. O'Malley	Auxiliary Bishop of Chicago	
	Archdiocese of Chicago		John S. Siemianowski	Auxiliary Bishop of Chicago	
	Archdiocese of Chicago		Lawrence J. Sullivan	Auxiliary Bishop of Chicago	
	Diocese of Belleville		Godfrey Mullen	Bishop of Belleville	
	Diocese of Joliet		Brendan John Cahill	Bishop of Joliet	
	Diocese of Joliet		Dennis E. Spies	Auxiliary Bishop of Joliet	
	Diocese of Peoria		Louis Tylka	Bishop of Peoria	
	Diocese of Rockford		David John Malloy	Bishop of Rockford	
	Diocese of Springfield in Illinois		Thomas Joseph Paprocki	Bishop of Springfield in Illinois	
=== Ecclesiastical Province of Cincinnati ===
	Archdiocese of Cincinnati		Robert Gerald Casey	Archbishop of Cincinnati	
	Diocese of Cleveland		Edward Charles Malesic	Bishop of Cleveland	
	Diocese of Cleveland		Michael G. Woost	Auxiliary Bishop of Cleveland	
	Diocese of Columbus		Earl K. Fernandes	Bishop of Columbus	
	Diocese of Steubenville		Sede vacante	Bishop of Steubenville	
	Diocese of Toledo		Daniel Edward Thomas	Bishop of Toledo	
	Diocese of Youngstown		David Bonnar	Bishop of Youngstown	
=== Ecclesiastical Province of Denver ===
	Archdiocese of Denver		James R. Golka	Archbishop of Denver	
	Archdiocese of Denver		Jorge Humberto Rodríguez-Novelo	Auxiliary Bishop of Denver	
	Diocese of Cheyenne		Steven Robert Biegler	Bishop of Cheyenne	
	Diocese of Colorado Springs		Sede Vacante	Bishop of Colorado Springs	
	Diocese of Pueblo		Stephen Jay Berg	Bishop of Pueblo	
=== Ecclesiastical Province of Detroit ===
	Archdiocese of Detroit		Edward Weisenburger	Archbishop of Detroit	
	Archdiocese of Detroit		Robert Joseph Fisher	Auxiliary Bishop of Detroit	
	Archdiocese of Detroit		Jeffrey M. Monforton	Auxiliary Bishop of Detroit	
	Archdiocese of Detroit		Paul Fitzpatrick Russell	Archbishop Auxiliary Bishop of Detroit	
	Diocese of Gaylord		Jeffrey Walsh	Bishop of Gaylord	
	Diocese of Grand Rapids		David John Walkowiak	Bishop of Grand Rapids	
	Diocese of Kalamazoo		Edward M. Lohse	Bishop of Kalamazoo	
	Diocese of Lansing		Earl Alfred Boyea, Jr.	Bishop of Lansing	
	Diocese of Marquette		John Francis Doerfler	Bishop of Marquette	
	Diocese of Saginaw		Robert Dwayne Gruss	Bishop of Saginaw	
=== Ecclesiastical Province of Dubuque ===
	Archdiocese of Dubuque		Thomas Robert Zinkula	Archbishop of Dubuque	
	Diocese of Davenport		Dennis G. Walsh	Bishop of Davenport	
	Diocese of Des Moines		William Michael Joensen	Bishop of Des Moines	
	Diocese of Sioux City		John Edward Keehner	Bishop of Sioux City	
=== Ecclesiastical Province of Galveston–Houston ===
	Archdiocese of Galveston–Houston		Joé Stephen Vásquez	Archbishop of Galveston–Houston	
	Archdiocese of Galveston–Houston		Italo Dell'Oro	Auxiliary Bishop of Galveston–Houston	
	Diocese of Austin		Daniel E. Garcia	Bishop of Austin	
	Diocese of Beaumont		David Toups	Bishop of Beaumont	
	Diocese of Brownsville		Daniel Ernesto Flores	Bishop of Brownsville	
	Diocese of Corpus Christi		Mario Alberto Avilés	Bishop of Corpus Christi	
	Diocese of Tyler		John Gregory Kelly	Bishop of Tyler	
	Diocese of Victoria		Sede Vacante	Bishop of Victoria	
=== Ecclesiastical Province of Hartford ===
	Archdiocese of Hartford		Christopher James Coyne	Archbishop of Hartford	
	Archdiocese of Hartford		Juan Miguel Betancourt	Auxiliary Bishop of Hartford	
	Diocese of Bridgeport		Frank Joseph Caggiano	Bishop of Bridgeport	
	Diocese of Norwich		Richard Francis Reidy	Bishop of Norwich	
	Diocese of Providence		Bruce Lewandowski	Bishop of Providence	
=== Ecclesiastical Province of Indianapolis ===
	Archdiocese of Indianapolis		Charles Coleman Thompson	Archbishop of Indianapolis	
	Diocese of Evansville		Joseph Mark Siegel	Bishop of Evansville	
	Diocese of Fort Wayne–South Bend		Kevin Carl Rhoades	Bishop of Fort Wayne–South Bend	
	Diocese of Gary		Robert John McClory	Bishop of Gary	
	Diocese of Lafayette in Indiana		Timothy Lawrence Doherty	Bishop of Lafayette in Indiana	
=== Ecclesiastical Province of Kansas City in Kansas ===
	Archdiocese of Kansas City in Kansas		Shawn McKnight	Archbishop of Kansas City in Kansas	
	Diocese of Dodge City		John Balthasar Brungardt	Bishop of Dodge City	
	Diocese of Salina		Gerald Lee Vincke	Bishop of Salina	
	Diocese of Wichita		Carl Alan Kemme	Bishop of Wichita	
=== Ecclesiastical Province of Las Vegas ===
	Archdiocese of Las Vegas	Coat Of Arms Roman Catholic Diocese of Las Vegas	George Leo Thomas	Archbishop of Las Vegas	
	Archdiocese of Las Vegas	Coat Of Arms Roman Catholic Diocese of Las Vegas	Gregory W. Gordon	Auxiliary Bishop of Las Vegas	
	Diocese of Reno		Daniel Henry Mueggenborg	Bishop of Reno	
	Diocese of Salt Lake City		Oscar Azarcon Solis	Bishop of Salt Lake City	
=== Ecclesiastical Province of Los Angeles ===
	Archdiocese of Los Angeles		José Horacio Gómez	Archbishop of Los Angeles	
	Archdiocese of Los Angeles		Albert Bahhuth	Auxiliary Bishop of Los Angeles	
	Archdiocese of Los Angeles		Matthew Elshoff	Auxiliary Bishop of Los Angeles	
	Archdiocese of Los Angeles		Brian Nunes	Auxiliary Bishop of Los Angeles	
	Archdiocese of Los Angeles		Slawomir Szkredka	Auxiliary Bishop of Los Angeles	
	Archdiocese of Los Angeles		Marc Vincent Trudeau	Auxiliary Bishop of Los Angeles	
	Diocese of Fresno		Joseph Vincent Brennan	Bishop of Fresno	
	Diocese of Monterey		Ramon Bejarano	Bishop of Monterey	
	Diocese of Orange		Kevin William Vann	Bishop of Orange	
	Diocese of Orange		Timothy Edward Freyer	Auxiliary Bishop of Orange	
	Diocese of Orange		Thanh Thai Nguyen	Auxiliary Bishop of Orange	
	Diocese of San Bernardino		Alberto Rojas	Bishop of San Bernardino	
	Diocese of San Diego		Michael Pham	Bishop of San Diego	
	Diocese of San Diego		Felipe Pulido	Auxiliary Bishop of San Diego	
=== Ecclesiastical Province of Louisville ===
	Archdiocese of Louisville		Shelton Joseph Fabre	Archbishop of Louisville	
	Diocese of Covington		John Iffert	Bishop of Covington	
	Diocese of Knoxville		James Mark Beckman	Bishop of Knoxville	
	Diocese of Lexington		John Eric Stowe	Bishop of Lexington	
	Diocese of Memphis		David Prescott Talley	Bishop of Memphis	
	Diocese of Nashville		J. Mark Spalding	Bishop of Nashville	
	Diocese of Owensboro		William Francis Medley	Bishop of Owensboro	
=== Ecclesiastical Province of Miami ===
	Archdiocese of Miami		Thomas Gerard Wenski	Archbishop of Miami	
	Archdiocese of Miami		Enrique Esteban Delgado	Auxiliary Bishop of Miami	
	Diocese of Orlando		John Gerard Noonan	Bishop of Orlando	
	Diocese of Palm Beach		Manuel de Jesús Rodríguez	Bishop of Palm Beach	
	Diocese of Pensacola–Tallahassee		William Albert Wack	Bishop of Pensacola–Tallahassee	
	Diocese of St. Augustine		Erik T. Pohlmeier	Bishop of St. Augustine	
	Diocese of St. Petersburg		Gregory Lawrence Parkes	Bishop of St. Petersburg	
	Diocese of Venice		Emilio Biosca Agüero	Bishop of Venice	
=== Ecclesiastical Province of Milwaukee ===
	Archdiocese of Milwaukee		Jeffrey S. Grob	Archbishop of Milwaukee	
	Archdiocese of Milwaukee		Jeffrey Robert Haines	Auxiliary Bishop of Milwaukee	
	Archdiocese of Milwaukee		James Thomas Schuerman	Auxiliary Bishop of Milwaukee	
	Diocese of Green Bay		David Laurin Ricken	Bishop of Green Bay	
	Diocese of La Crosse		Gerard William Battersby	Bishop of La Crosse	
	Diocese of Madison		Donald J. Hying	Bishop of Madison	
	Diocese of Superior		James Patrick Powers	Bishop of Superior	
=== Ecclesiastical Province of Mobile ===
	Archdiocese of Mobile		Mark Steven Rivituso	Archbishop of Mobile	
	Diocese of Biloxi		Louis Frederick Kihneman III	Bishop of Biloxi	
	Diocese of Birmingham		Steven J. Raica	Bishop of Birmingham	
	Diocese of Jackson		Joseph Richard Kopacz	Bishop of Jackson	
=== Ecclesiastical Province of New Orleans ===
	Archdiocese of New Orleans		James Francis Checchio	Archbishop of New Orleans	
	Diocese of Alexandria		Robert W. Marshall	Bishop of Alexandria	
	Diocese of Baton Rouge		Michael Gerard Duca	Bishop of Baton Rouge	
	Diocese of Houma–Thibodaux		Simon Peter Engurait	Bishop of Houma–Thibodaux	
	Diocese of Lafayette in Louisiana		John Douglas Deshotel	Bishop of Lafayette in Louisiana	
	Diocese of Lake Charles		Glen John Provost	Bishop of Lake Charles	
	Diocese of Shreveport		Sede Vacante	Bishop of Shreveport	
=== Ecclesiastical Province of New York ===
	Archdiocese of New York		Ronald Hicks	Archbishop of New York	
	Archdiocese of New York		Gerardo Joseph Colacicco	Auxiliary Bishop of New York	
	Archdiocese of New York		Joseph A. Espaillat	Auxiliary Bishop of New York	
	Archdiocese of New York		Edmund James Whalen	Auxiliary Bishop of New York	
	Diocese of Albany		Mark William O’Connell	Bishop of Albany	
	Diocese of Brooklyn		Robert John Brennan	Bishop of Brooklyn	
	Diocese of Brooklyn		James Massa	Auxiliary Bishop of Brooklyn	
	Diocese of Brooklyn		Witold Mroziewski	Auxiliary Bishop of Brooklyn	
	Diocese of Buffalo		Michael William Fisher	Bishop of Buffalo	
	Diocese of Ogdensburg		Terry Ronald LaValley	Bishop of Ogdensburg	
	Diocese of Rochester		John S. Bonnici	Bishop of Rochester	
	Diocese of Rockville Centre		John Oliver Barres	Bishop of Rockville Centre	
	Diocese of Rockville Centre		Robert Joseph Coyle	Auxiliary Bishop of Rockville Centre	
	Diocese of Rockville Centre		Luis Miguel Romero Fernández	Auxiliary Bishop of Rockville Centre	
	Diocese of Rockville Centre		Andrzej Jerzy Zglejszewski	Auxiliary Bishop of Rockville Centre	
	Diocese of Syracuse		Douglas Lucia	Bishop of Syracuse	
=== Ecclesiastical Province of Newark ===
	Archdiocese of Newark		Joseph William Tobin	Archbishop of Newark	
	Archdiocese of Newark		Pedro Bismarck Chau	Auxiliary Bishop of Newark	
	Archdiocese of Newark		Manuel Aurelio Cruz	Auxiliary Bishop of Newark	
	Archdiocese of Newark		Elias R. Lorenzo	Auxiliary Bishop of Newark	
	Diocese of Camden		Joseph A. Williams	Bishop of Camden	
	Diocese of Metuchen		Michael A. Saporito	Bishop of Metuchen	
	Diocese of Paterson		Kevin J. Sweeney	Bishop of Paterson	
	Diocese of Trenton		David Michael O'Connell	Bishop of Trenton	
=== Ecclesiastical Province of Oklahoma City ===
	Archdiocese of Oklahoma City		Paul Stagg Coakley	Archbishop of Oklahoma City	
	Diocese of Little Rock		Anthony Basil Taylor	Bishop of Little Rock	
	Diocese of Tulsa		David Austin Konderla	Bishop of Tulsa	
=== Ecclesiastical Province of Omaha ===
	Archdiocese of Omaha		Michael G. McGovern	Archbishop of Omaha	
	Diocese of Grand Island		Joseph Gerard Hanefeldt	Bishop of Grand Island	
	Diocese of Lincoln		James Douglas Conley	Bishop of Lincoln	
=== Ecclesiastical Province of Philadelphia ===
	Archdiocese of Philadelphia		Nelson Jesus Perez	Archbishop of Philadelphia	
	Archdiocese of Philadelphia		Keith J. Chylinski	Auxiliary Bishop of Philadelphia	
	Archdiocese of Philadelphia		Christopher R. Cooke	Auxiliary Bishop of Philadelphia	
	Archdiocese of Philadelphia		Efren V. Esmilla	Auxiliary Bishop of Philadelphia	
	Archdiocese of Philadelphia		John Joseph McIntyre	Auxiliary Bishop of Philadelphia	
	Diocese of Allentown		Alfred Andrew Schlert	Bishop of Allentown	
	Diocese of Altoona–Johnstown		Mark Leonard Bartchak	Bishop of Altoona–Johnstown	
	Diocese of Erie		Lawrence T. Persico	Bishop of Erie	
	Diocese of Greensburg		Larry James Kulick	Bishop of Greensburg	
	Diocese of Harrisburg		Timothy Christian Senior	Bishop of Harrisburg	
	Diocese of Pittsburgh		Mark Eckman	Bishop of Pittsburgh	
	Diocese of Pittsburgh		William John Waltersheid	Auxiliary Bishop of Pittsburgh	
	Diocese of Scranton		Joseph Charles Bambera	Bishop of Scranton	
=== Ecclesiastical Province of Portland ===
	Archdiocese of Portland		Alexander King Sample	Archbishop of Portland	
	Archdiocese of Portland		Peter Leslie Smith	Auxiliary Bishop of Portland	
	Diocese of Baker		Thomas Joseph Hennen	Bishop of Baker	
	Diocese of Boise		Peter Forsyth Christensen	Bishop of Boise	
	Diocese of Great Falls–Billings		Jeffrey M. Fleming	Bishop of Great Falls–Billings	
	Diocese of Helena		Austin Anthony Vetter	Bishop of Helena	
=== Ecclesiastical Province of St. Louis ===
	Archdiocese of St. Louis		Mitchell T. Rozanski	Archbishop of St. Louis	
	Diocese of Jefferson City		Ralph Bernard O'Donnell	Bishop of Jefferson City	
	Diocese of Kansas City–Saint Joseph		James Vann Johnston, Jr.	Bishop of Kansas City–Saint Joseph	
	Diocese of Springfield–Cape Girardeau		Edward Matthew Rice	Bishop of Springfield–Cape Girardeau	
=== Ecclesiastical Province of Saint Paul and Minneapolis ===
	Archdiocese of Saint Paul and Minneapolis		Bernard Anthony Hebda	Archbishop of Saint Paul and Minneapolis	
	Archdiocese of Saint Paul and Minneapolis		Michael Izen	Auxiliary Bishop of Saint Paul and Minneapolis	
	Archdiocese of Saint Paul and Minneapolis		Kevin Kenney	Auxiliary Bishop of Saint Paul and Minneapolis	
	Diocese of Bismarck		David Dennis Kagan	Bishop of Bismarck	
	Diocese of Crookston		Andrew Harmon Cozzens	Bishop of Crookston	
	Diocese of Duluth		Daniel John Felton	Bishop of Duluth	
	Diocese of Fargo		John Thomas Folda	Bishop of Fargo	
	Diocese of New Ulm		Chad William Zielinski	Bishop of New Ulm	
	Diocese of Rapid City		Scott E. Bullock	Bishop of Rapid City	
	Diocese of Saint Cloud		Patrick Neary	Bishop of Saint Cloud	
	Diocese of Sioux Falls		Donald DeGrood	Bishop of Sioux Falls	
	Diocese of Winona-Rochester		Robert Emmet Barron	Bishop of Winona-Rochester	
=== Ecclesiastical Province of San Antonio ===
	Archdiocese of San Antonio		Gustavo Garcia-Siller	Archbishop of San Antonio	
	Archdiocese of San Antonio		José Arturo Cepeda	Auxiliary Bishop of San Antonio	
	Archdiocese of San Antonio		Gary W. Janak	Auxiliary Bishop of San Antonio	
	Diocese of Amarillo		Sede Vacante	Bishop of Amarillo	
	Diocese of Dallas		Edward James Burns	Bishop of Dallas	
	Diocese of El Paso		Mark Joseph Seitz	Bishop of El Paso	
	Diocese of El Paso		Anthony Cerdan Celino	Auxiliary Bishop of El Paso	
	Diocese of Fort Worth		Michael Fors Olson	Bishop of Fort Worth	
	Diocese of Laredo		John Jairo Gomez	Bishop of Laredo	
	Diocese of Lubbock		Robert Milner Coerver	Bishop of Lubbock	
	Diocese of San Angelo		Michael James Sis	Bishop of San Angelo	
=== Ecclesiastical Province of San Francisco ===
	Archdiocese of San Francisco		Salvatore Joseph Cordileone	Archbishop of San Francisco	
	Diocese of Honolulu		Michael T. Castori	Bishop of Honolulu	
	Diocese of Oakland		Michael Charles Barber	Bishop of Oakland	
	Diocese of Sacramento		Jaime Soto	Bishop of Sacramento	
	Diocese of Sacramento		Rey Bersabal	Auxiliary Bishop of Sacramento	
	Diocese of San Jose		Oscar Cantú	Bishop of San Jose	
	Diocese of San Jose		Andres Cantoria Ligot	Auxiliary Bishop of San Jose	
	Diocese of Santa Rosa		Robert Francis Vasa	Bishop of Santa Rosa	
	Diocese of Stockton		Myron Joseph Cotta	Bishop of Stockton	
=== Ecclesiastical Province of Santa Fe ===
	Archdiocese of Santa Fe		John Charles Wester	Archbishop of Santa Fe	
	Diocese of Gallup		James Sean Wall	Bishop of Gallup	
	Diocese of Las Cruces		Peter Baldacchino	Bishop of Las Cruces	
	Diocese of Phoenix		John Patrick Dolan	Bishop of Phoenix	
	Diocese of Phoenix		Peter Dai Bui	Auxiliary Bishop of Phoenix	
	Diocese of Phoenix		Eduardo Alanis Nevares	Auxiliary Bishop of Phoenix	
	Diocese of Tucson		James Misko	Bishop of Tucson	
=== Ecclesiastical Province of Seattle ===
	Archdiocese of Seattle		Paul Dennis Etienne	Archbishop of Seattle	
	Archdiocese of Seattle		Eusebio L. Elizondo Almaguer	Auxiliary Bishop of Seattle	
	Archdiocese of Seattle		Frank R. Schuster	Auxiliary Bishop of Seattle	
	Diocese of Spokane		Thomas Anthony Daly	Bishop of Spokane	
	Diocese of Yakima		Joseph Jude Tyson	Bishop of Yakima	
=== Ecclesiastical Province of Washington ===
	Archdiocese of Washington		Robert W. McElroy	Archbishop of Washington	
	Archdiocese of Washington		Robert P. Boxie	Auxiliary Bishop of Washington	
	Archdiocese of Washington		Juan Esposito-Garcia	Auxiliary Bishop of Washington	
	Archdiocese of Washington		Gary Studniewski	Auxiliary Bishop of Washington	
	Diocese of Saint Thomas (This diocese covers the U.S. territory of the United States Virgin Islands.)		Jerome Feudjio	Bishop of Saint Thomas	
=== Archdiocese for the Military Services, USA ===
	Archdiocese for the Military Services		Timothy Paul Broglio	Archbishop for the Military Services	
	Archdiocese for the Military Services		Neal James Buckon	Auxiliary Bishop for the Military Services	
	Archdiocese for the Military Services		Gregg Michael Caggianelli	Auxiliary Bishop for the Military Services	
	Archdiocese for the Military Services		Joseph Lawrence Coffey	Auxiliary Bishop for the Military Services	
	Archdiocese for the Military Services		William James Muhm	Auxiliary Bishop for the Military Services	

Puerto Rican Episcopal Conference

List of living bishops of Puerto Rican dioceses
Ecclesiastical province map	Archdiocese or diocese	Diocese coat of arms	Archbishop or bishop	Title	Bishop coat of arms
=== Ecclesiastical Province of San Juan === (This province covers the U.S. territory of Puerto Rico.)
	Archdiocese of San Juan		Eusebio Ramos Morales	Archbishop of San Juan	
	Archdiocese of San Juan		Tomás González González	Auxiliary Bishop of San Juan	
	Diocese of Arecibo		Alberto Arturo Figueroa Morales	Bishop of Arecibo	
	Diocese of Caguas		Sede Vacante	Bishop of Caguas	
	Diocese of Fajardo–Humacao		Luis Miranda Rivera	Bishop of Fajardo–Humacao	
	Diocese of Fajardo–Humacao		Gerardo Antonio Vargas Cruz	Coadjutor Bishop of Fajardo–Humacao	
	Diocese of Mayagüez		Ángel Luis Ríos Matos	Bishop of Mayagüez	
	Diocese of Ponce		Geraldo Ramírez Torres	Bishop of Ponce	

Episcopal Conference of the Pacific

List of living bishops dioceses in the Episcopal Conference of the Pacific
Ecclesiastical province map	Archdiocese or diocese	Diocese coat of arms	Archbishop or bishop	Title	Bishop coat of arms
=== Ecclesiastical Province of Agaña ===
	Archdiocese of Agaña (This diocese covers the U.S. territory of Guam.)		Ryan Pagente Jimenez	Archbishop of Agaña	
	Diocese of Chalan Kanoa (This diocese covers the U.S. territory of the Northern Mariana Islands.)		Romeo Duetao Convocar	Bishop of Chalan Kanoa	
=== Ecclesiastical Province of Samoa–Apia ===
	Diocese of Samoa–Pago Pago (This diocese covers the U.S. territory of American Samoa.)		Kolio Etuale	Bishop of Samoa–Pago Pago	

=== Bishops emeriti ===
Bishops emeriti in the United States
Province	Name	Title	Ecclesiastical territory
Anchorage-Juneau	Roger Lawrence Schwietz	archbishop emeritus	Archdiocese of Anchorage
Atlanta	Robert Eric Guglielmone	bishop emeritus	Diocese of Charleston
Atlanta	Peter Joseph Jugis	bishop emeritus	Diocese of Charlotte
Atlanta	John Kevin Boland	bishop emeritus	Diocese of Savannah
Baltimore	Edwin Frederick O'Brien	archbishop emeritus	Archdiocese of Baltimore
Baltimore	Denis James Madden	auxiliary bishop emeritus	Archdiocese of Baltimore
Baltimore	Paul Stephen Loverde	bishop emeritus	Diocese of Arlington
Baltimore	Mark Edward Brennan	bishop emeritus	Diocese of Wheeling-Charleston
Baltimore	William Francis Malooly	bishop emeritus	Diocese of Wilmington
Boston	Seán Patrick O'Malley	archbishop emeritus	Archdiocese of Boston
Boston	John Anthony Dooher	auxiliary bishop emeritus	Archdiocese of Boston
Boston	Arthur Leo Kennedy	auxiliary bishop emeritus	Archdiocese of Boston
Boston	Francis Joseph Christian	auxiliary bishop emeritus	Diocese of Manchester
Boston	Robert Peter Deeley	bishop emeritus	Diocese of Portland
Chicago	Francis Joseph Kane	auxiliary bishop emeritus	Archdiocese of Chicago
Chicago	Joseph Nathaniel Perry	auxiliary bishop emeritus	Archdiocese of Chicago
Chicago	George James Rassas	auxiliary bishop emeritus	Archdiocese of Chicago
Chicago	Andrew Peter Wypych	auxiliary bishop emeritus	Archdiocese of Chicago
Chicago	Edward Kenneth Braxton	bishop emeritus	Diocese of Belleville
Chicago	Robert Daniel Conlon	bishop emeritus	Diocese of Joliet
Chicago	Daniel Robert Jenky	bishop emeritus	Diocese of Peoria
Cincinnati	Dennis Marion Schnurr	archbishop emeritus	Archdiocese of Cincinnati
Cincinnati	Joseph Robert Binzer	auxiliary bishop emeritus	Archdiocese of Cincinnati
Cincinnati	Roger William Gries	auxiliary bishop emeritus	Diocese of Cleveland
Cincinnati	Frederick Francis Campbell	bishop emeritus	Diocese of Columbus
Cincinnati	James Anthony Griffin	bishop emeritus	Diocese of Columbus
Denver	James Francis Stafford	archbishop emeritus	Archdiocese of Denver
Denver	Samuel Joseph Aquila	archbishop emeritus	Archdiocese of Denver
Denver	Richard Charles Patrick Hanifen	bishop emeritus	Diocese of Colorado Springs
Denver	Fernando Isern	bishop emeritus	Diocese of Pueblo
Detroit	Adam Joseph Maida	archbishop emeritus	Archdiocese of Detroit
Detroit	Allen Henry Vigneron	archbishop emeritus	Archdiocese of Detroit
Detroit	Donald Francis Hanchon	auxiliary bishop emeritus	Archdiocese of Detroit
Detroit	Francis Ronald Reiss	auxiliary bishop emeritus	Archdiocese of Detroit
Detroit	Walter Allison Hurley	bishop emeritus	Diocese of Grand Rapids
Detroit	Paul Joseph Bradley	bishop emeritus	Diocese of Kalamazoo
Detroit	James Henry Garland	bishop emeritus	Diocese of Marquette
Dubuque	Jerome George Hanus	archbishop emeritus	Archdiocese of Dubuque
Dubuque	Michael Owen Jackels	archbishop emeritus	Archdiocese of Dubuque
Dubuque	Martin John Amos	bishop emeritus	Diocese of Davenport
Dubuque	Joseph Léo Charron	bishop emeritus	Diocese of Des Moines
Dubuque	Richard Edmund Pates	bishop emeritus	Diocese of Des Moines
Dubuque	Ralph Walker Nickless	bishop emeritus	Diocese of Sioux City
Galveston-Houston	Daniel Nicholas DiNardo	archbishop emeritus	Archdiocese of Galveston–Houston
Galveston-Houston	Curtis J. Guillory	bishop emeritus	Diocese of Beaumont
Galveston-Houston	Edmond Carmody	bishop emeritus	Diocese of Corpus Christi
Galveston-Houston	William Michael Mulvey	bishop emeritus	Diocese of Corpus Christi
Galveston-Houston	Joseph Edward Strickland	bishop emeritus	Diocese of Tyler
Hartford	Leonard Paul Blair	archbishop emeritus	Archdiocese of Hartford
Hartford	Daniel Anthony Cronin	archbishop emeritus	Archdiocese of Hartford
Hartford	Christie Albert Macaluso	auxiliary bishop emeritus	Archdiocese of Hartford
Hartford	Peter Anthony Rosazza	auxiliary bishop emeritus	Archdiocese of Hartford
Hartford	Michael Richard Cote	bishop emeritus	Diocese of Norwich
Hartford	Thomas Joseph Tobin	bishop emeritus	Diocese of Providence
Hartford	Robert Charles Evans	auxiliary bishop emeritus	Diocese of Providence
Indianapolis	Gerald Andrew Gettelfinger	bishop emeritus	Diocese of Evansville
Kansas City in Kansas	Joseph Fred Naumann	archbishop emeritus	Archdiocese of Kansas City in Kansas
Kansas City in Kansas	Ronald Michael Gilmore	bishop emeritus	Diocese of Dodge City
Las Vegas	Joseph Anthony Pepe	bishop emeritus	Diocese of Las Vegas
Las Vegas	Randolph Roque Calvo	bishop emeritus	Diocese of Reno
Las Vegas	Phillip Francis Straling	bishop emeritus	Diocese of Reno
Los Angeles	Roger Michael Mahony	archbishop emeritus	Archdiocese of Los Angeles
Los Angeles	Alejandro Dumbrigue Aclan	auxiliary bishop emeritus	Archdiocese of Los Angeles
Los Angeles	Edward William Clark	auxiliary bishop emeritus	Archdiocese of Los Angeles
Los Angeles	Thomas John Curry	auxiliary bishop emeritus	Archdiocese of Los Angeles
Los Angeles	Alexander Salazar	auxiliary bishop emeritus	Archdiocese of Los Angeles
Los Angeles	Gerald Eugene Wilkerson	auxiliary bishop emeritus	Archdiocese of Los Angeles
Los Angeles	Gabino Zavala	auxiliary bishop emeritus	Archdiocese of Los Angeles
Los Angeles	Armando Xavier Ochoa	bishop emeritus	Diocese of Fresno
Los Angeles	Sylvester Donovan Ryan	bishop emeritus	Diocese of Monterey
Los Angeles	Gerald Richard Barnes	bishop emeritus	Diocese of San Bernardino
Los Angeles	Rutilio del Riego Jáñez	auxiliary bishop emeritus	Diocese of San Bernardino
Louisville	Joseph Edward Kurtz	archbishop emeritus	Archdiocese of Louisville
Louisville	Roger Joseph Foys	bishop emeritus	Diocese of Covington
Louisville	James Kendrick Williams	bishop emeritus	Diocese of Lexington
Louisville	Martin David Holley	bishop emeritus	Diocese of Memphis
Louisville	James Terry Steib	bishop emeritus	Diocese of Memphis
Miami	John Clement Favalora	archbishop emeritus	Archdiocese of Miami
Miami	Gerald Michael Barbarito	bishop emeritus	Diocese of Palm Beach
Miami	Joseph Keith Symons	bishop emeritus	Diocese of Palm Beach
Miami	Felipe de Jesús Estévez	bishop emeritus	Diocese of St. Augustine
Miami	Robert Nugent Lynch	bishop emeritus	Diocese of St. Petersburg
Milwaukee	Jerome Edward Listecki	archbishop emeritus	Archdiocese of Milwaukee
Milwaukee	Robert Fealey Morneau	auxiliary bishop emeritus	Diocese of Green Bay
Milwaukee	William Patrick Callahan	bishop emeritus	Diocese of La Crosse
Mobile	Thomas John Rodi	archbishop emeritus	Archdiocese of Mobile
Mobile	Robert Joseph Baker	bishop emeritus	Diocese of Birmingham
New Orleans	Gregory Michael Aymond	archbishop emeritus	Archdiocese of New Orleans
New Orleans	Alfred Clifton Hughes	archbishop emeritus	Archdiocese of New Orleans
New Orleans	Robert William Muench	bishop emeritus	Diocese of Baton Rouge
New Orleans	Sam Gallip Jacobs	bishop emeritus	Diocese of Houma–Thibodaux
New Orleans	Charles Michael Jarrell	bishop emeritus	Diocese of Lafayette in Louisiana
New Orleans	Francis Ignatius Malone	bishop emeritus	Diocese of Shreveport
New York	Timothy Michael Dolan	archbishop emeritus	Archdiocese of New York
New York	Peter John Byrne	auxiliary bishop emeritus	Archdiocese of New York
New York	Josu Iriondo	auxiliary bishop emeritus	Archdiocese of New York
New York	John Joseph Jenik	auxiliary bishop emeritus	Archdiocese of New York
New York	Dominick John Lagonegro	auxiliary bishop emeritus	Archdiocese of New York
New York	James Francis McCarthy	auxiliary bishop emeritus	Archdiocese of New York
New York	John Joseph O'Hara	auxiliary bishop emeritus	Archdiocese of New York
New York	Edward Bernard Scharfenberger	bishop emeritus	Diocese of Albany
New York	Nicholas Anthony DiMarzio	bishop emeritus	Diocese of Brooklyn
New York	Raymond Francis Chappetto	auxiliary bishop emeritus	Diocese of Brooklyn
New York	Octavio Cisneros	auxiliary bishop emeritus	Diocese of Brooklyn
New York	Paul Robert Sanchez	auxiliary bishop emeritus	Diocese of Brooklyn
New York	Neil Edward Tiedemann	auxiliary bishop emeritus	Diocese of Brooklyn
New York	Richard Joseph Malone	bishop emeritus	Diocese of Buffalo
New York	Edward Michael Grosz	auxiliary bishop emeritus	Diocese of Buffalo
New York	Salvatore Ronald Matano	bishop emeritus	Diocese of Rochester
New York	John Charles Dunne	auxiliary bishop emeritus	Diocese of Rockville Centre
New York	Robert Joseph Cunningham	bishop emeritus	Diocese of Syracuse
Newark	John Walter Flesey	auxiliary bishop emeritus	Archdiocese of Newark
Newark	Dominic Anthony Marconi	auxiliary bishop emeritus	Archdiocese of Newark
Newark	Gregory James Studerus	auxiliary bishop emeritus	Archdiocese of Newark
Newark	Dennis Joseph Sullivan	bishop emeritus	Diocese of Camden
Newark	Paul Gregory Bootkoski	bishop emeritus	Diocese of Metuchen
Newark	Arthur Joseph Serratelli	bishop emeritus	Diocese of Paterson
Omaha	Elden Francis Curtiss	archbishop emeritus	Archdiocese of Omaha
Omaha	George Joseph Lucas	archbishop emeritus	Archdiocese of Omaha
Omaha	William Joseph Dendinger	bishop emeritus	Diocese of Grand Island
Omaha	Fabian Wendelin Bruskewitz	bishop emeritus	Diocese of Lincoln
Philadelphia	Charles Joseph Chaput	archbishop emeritus	Archdiocese of Philadelphia
Philadelphia	Justin Francis Rigali	archbishop emeritus	Archdiocese of Philadelphia
Philadelphia	Edward Michael Deliman	auxiliary bishop emeritus	Archdiocese of Philadelphia
Philadelphia	Michael Joseph Fitzgerald	auxiliary bishop emeritus	Archdiocese of Philadelphia
Philadelphia	Ronald William Gainer	bishop emeritus	Diocese of Harrisburg
Philadelphia	David Allen Zubik	bishop emeritus	Diocese of Pittsburgh
Philadelphia	William Joseph Winter	auxiliary bishop emeritus	Diocese of Pittsburgh
Philadelphia	Joseph Francis Martino	bishop emeritus	Diocese of Scranton
Portland	Kenneth Donald Steiner	auxiliary bishop emeritus	Archdiocese of Portland
Portland	Liam Stephen Cary	bishop emeritus	Diocese of Baker
Portland	Michael William Warfel	bishop emeritus	Diocese of Great Falls-Billings
St. Louis	Raymond Leo Burke	archbishop emeritus	Archdiocese of St. Louis
St. Louis	Robert James Carlson	archbishop emeritus	Archdiocese of St. Louis
St. Louis	Robert Joseph Hermann	auxiliary bishop emeritus	Archdiocese of St. Louis
St. Louis	Robert William Finn	bishop emeritus	Diocese of Kansas City-Saint Joseph
St. Louis	John Joseph Leibrecht	bishop emeritus	Diocese of Springfield-Cape Girardeau
Saint Paul and Minneapolis	John Clayton Nienstedt	archbishop emeritus	Archdiocese of Saint Paul and Minneapolis
Saint Paul and Minneapolis	Lee Anthony Piché	auxiliary bishop emeritus	Archdiocese of Saint Paul and Minneapolis
Saint Paul and Minneapolis	Victor Hermann Balke	bishop emeritus	Diocese of Crookston
Saint Paul and Minneapolis	Michael Joseph Hoeppner	bishop emeritus	Diocese of Crookston
Saint Paul and Minneapolis	John Marvin LeVoir	bishop emeritus	Diocese of New Ulm
Saint Paul and Minneapolis	Donald Joseph Kettler	bishop emeritus	Diocese of Saint Cloud
Saint Paul and Minneapolis	John Michael Quinn	bishop emeritus	Diocese of Winona-Rochester
San Antonio	Michael Joseph Boulette	auxiliary bishop emeritus	Archdiocese of San Antonio
San Antonio	Patrick James Zurek	bishop emeritus	Diocese of Amarillo
San Antonio	Kevin Joseph Farrell	bishop emeritus	Diocese of Dallas
San Antonio	James Anthony Tamayo	bishop emeritus	Diocese of Laredo
San Antonio	Plácido Rodriguez	bishop emeritus	Diocese of Lubbock
San Antonio	Michael David Pfeifer	bishop emeritus	Diocese of San Angelo
San Francisco	William Joseph Justice	auxiliary bishop emeritus	Archdiocese of San Francisco
San Francisco	Ignatius Chung Wang	auxiliary bishop emeritus	Archdiocese of San Francisco
San Francisco	Clarence Richard Silva	bishop emeritus	Diocese of Honolulu
San Francisco	William Keith Weigand	bishop emeritus	Diocese of Sacramento
San Francisco	Daniel Francis Walsh	bishop emeritus	Diocese of Santa Rosa
Santa Fe	Ricardo Ramirez	bishop emeritus	Diocese of Las Cruces
Santa Fe	Thomas James Olmsted	bishop emeritus	Diocese of Phoenix
Santa Fe	Gerald Frederick Kicanas	bishop emeritus	Diocese of Tucson
Seattle	James Peter Sartain	archbishop emeritus	Archdiocese of Seattle
Seattle	William Stephen Skylstad	bishop emeritus	Diocese of Spokane
Seattle	Carlos Arthur Sevilla	bishop emeritus	Diocese of Yakima
Washington	Wilton Daniel Gregory	archbishop emeritus	Archdiocese of Washington
Washington	Donald William Wuerl	archbishop emeritus	Archdiocese of Washington
Washington	Roy Edward Campbell	auxiliary bishop emeritus	Archdiocese of Washington
Military Services	Richard Brendan Higgins	auxiliary bishop emeritus	Archdiocese of Military Services
Military Services	Frank Richard Spencer	auxiliary bishop emeritus	Archdiocese of Military Services
San Juan	Roberto González Nieves	Archbishop emeritus	Archdiocese of San Juan de Puerto Rico
San Juan	Daniel Fernández Torres	bishop emeritus	Diocese of Arecibo
San Juan	Enrique Manuel Hernández Rivera	bishop emeritus	Diocese of Caguas
San Juan	Alvaro Corrada del Rio	bishop emeritus	Diocese of Mayagüez
San Juan	Rubén González Medina	bishop emeritus	Diocese of Ponce
San Juan	Félix Lázaro Martinez	bishop emeritus	Diocese of Ponce
Agaña	Anthony Sablan Apuron	archbishop emeritus	Archdiocese of Agaña
Samoa–Apia	Peter Hugh Brown	bishop emeritus	Diocese of Samoa–Pago Pago

== Personal Ordinariate of the Chair of Saint Peter ==
The Personal Ordinariate of the Chair of Saint Peter is a special diocese comprising Anglican converts to Catholicism. Under canon law, if the personal ordinary is not a bishop, he is treated as the equivalent of a diocesan bishop.

List of living bishops of the Personal Ordinariate of the Chair of Saint Peter
Province	Ecclesiastical province map	Diocese's coat of arms	Bishop	Title	Bishop's coat of arms
Personal Ordinariate of the Chair of Saint Peter			Steven Joseph Lopes	Bishop of the Personal Ordinariate of the Chair of Saint Peter	

== Eastern Catholic eparchs ==
=== Metropolis of Philadelphia for Ukrainians ===
The Ukrainian Catholic Metropolitan Province of Philadelphia consists of four eparchies of the Ukrainian Greek Catholic Church, and covers the entire United States.

List of living bishops of in the Metropolis of Philadelphia for Ukrainians
Metropolia	Metropolia map	Archeparchy or eparchy	Eparchy's Coat of Arms	Archeparch or eparch	Title	Eparch's Coat of arms
Philadelphia		Archeparchy of Philadelphia		Borys Gudziak	Archeparch of Philadelphia	
Philadelphia		Eparchy of Chicago		Venedykt Aleksiychuk	Eparch of Chicago	
Philadelphia		Eparchy of Parma		Bohdan Danylo	Eparch of Parma	
Philadelphia		Eparchy of Stamford		Paul Patrick Chomnycky	Eparch of Stamford	

=== Metropolis of Pittsburgh for Ruthenians ===
The Metropolis of Pittsburgh is a sui iuris metropolitan province of the Ruthenian Greek Catholic Church. The metropolis consists of four eparchies and covers the entire United States. Its geographic remit also includes the Exarchate of Toronto in Canada.

The metropolis has ecclesiastical jurisdiction over all Ruthenian Catholics in the United States, as well as other Byzantine Rite Catholics without an established hierarchy in the country.

List of living bishops of eparchies in the Metropolis of Pittsburgh for Ruthenians
Metropolia	Metropolia map	Archeparchy or eparchy	Eparchy's Coat of Arms	Archeparch or eparch	Title	Eparch's Coat of arms
Pittsburgh		Archeparchy of Pittsburgh		William C. Skurla	Archeparch of Pittsburgh	
Pittsburgh		Eparchy of Parma		Robert Mark Pipta	Eparch of Parma	
Pittsburgh		Eparchy of Passaic		Kurt Burnette	Eparch of Passaic	
Pittsburgh		Eparchy of Phoenix		Artur Bubnevych	Eparch of Phoenix	

=== American eparchies that are immediately subject to the Holy See ===
The other Eastern Catholic Churches with eparchies (dioceses) or exarchates established in the United States are not grouped into metropoliae. All are immediately subject to the Holy See, with limited oversight by the head of their respective sui iuris churches.

List of living bishops of eparchies in the Metropolis of Pittsburgh for Ruthenians
Church	Eparchy	Eparchy's Coat of Arms	Eparch	Title	Eparch's Coat of Arms
Chaldean Catholic Church	Chaldean Catholic Eparchy of Detroit		Francis Y. Kalabat	Eparch of Detroit	
Chaldean Catholic Church	Chaldean Catholic Eparchy of San Diego		Sede Vacante	Eparch of San Diego	
Maronite Church	Maronite Catholic Eparchy of Brooklyn		Gregory John Mansour	Eparch of Brooklyn	
Maronite Church	Maronite Catholic Eparchy of Los Angeles		Abdallah Elias Zaidan	Eparch of Los Angeles	
Melkite Greek Catholic Church	Melkite Greek Catholic Eparchy of Newton		Francois Beyrouti	Eparch of Newton	
Syriac Catholic Church	Syrian Catholic Eparchy of Newark		Yousif Habash	Eparch of Newark	
Syro-Malabar Catholic Church	Syro-Malabar Catholic Eparchy of Chicago		Joy Alappatt	Eparch of Chicago	

=== American-Canadian eparchies that are immediately subject to the Holy See ===
Several Eastern Catholic churches have jurisdictions that include members and congregations in both the United States and Canada.

List of living bishops of American-Canadian eparchies that are immediately subject to the Holy See
Church	Eparchy	Eparchy's Coat of Arm	Eparch	Title	Eparch's Coat of Arms
Armenian Catholic Church	Armenian Catholic Eparchy of the US and Canada		Mikaël Mouradian	Eparch	
Armenian Catholic Church	Armenian Catholic Eparchy of the US and Canada		Parsegh Baghdassarian	Auxiliary Eparch	
Romanian Catholic Church	Romanian Catholic Eparchy of Canton		John Michael Botean	Eparch of Canton	
Syro-Malankara Catholic Church	Syro-Malankara Catholic Eparchy of the US and Canada		Philippos Stephanos Thottathil	Eparch	
Coptic Catholic Church	(not a formal ecclesiastical jurisdiction)		Pola Ayoub Matta Usama Shafik Akhnoukh	Apostolic Visitator	

=== List of eparchs emeriti and archeparch emeritus ===
List of living eparchs emeriti and archeparch emeriti in the United States
Archeparch or Eparch	Title	Archeparchy or eparchy
Ibrahim Ibrahim	eparch emeritus	Chaldean Catholic Eparchy of Detroit
Emanuel Hana Shaleta	eparch emeritus	Chaldean Catholic Eparchy of San Diego
Nicholas James Samra	eparch emeritus	Melkite Greek Catholic Eparchy of Newton
John Michael Kudrick	eparch emeritus	Ruthenian Catholic Eparchy of Parma
John Stephen Pazak	eparch emeritus	Ruthenian Catholic Eparchy of Phoenix
Jacob Angadiath	eparch emeritus	Syro-Malabar Catholic Eparchy of Chicago
Stefan Soroka	archeparch emeritus	Ukrainian Catholic Archeparchy of Philadelphia

== American bishops serving outside the United States ==
=== Bishops serving in Vatican City ===
- Pope Leo XIV (Robert Francis Prevost), Supreme Pontiff and Bishop of Rome
- Joseph Augustine Di Noia, O.P., adjunct secretary of the Dicastery for the Doctrine of the Faith
- Kevin Joseph Farrell, Camerlengo of the Holy Roman Church and prefect of the Dicastery for the Laity, Family and Life
- James Michael Harvey, archpriest of the Basilica of Saint Paul Outside the Walls

=== Bishops emeriti who served in Vatican City ===
- Raymond Leo Burke, patron emeritus of the Sovereign Military Order of Malta
- Edwin Frederick O'Brien, grand master emeritus of the Equestrian Order of the Holy Sepulchre of Jerusalem
- James Francis Stafford, major penitentiary emeritus of the Apostolic Penitentiary

=== Bishops serving in the Diplomatic Corps of the Holy See ===
- Charles Daniel Balvo, apostolic nuncio to Australia (Archdiocese of New York)
- Michael Wallace Banach, apostolic nuncio to Hungary (Diocese of Worcester)
- Charles John Brown, apostolic nuncio to the Philippines (Archdiocese of New York)
- Kevin Stuart Randall, apostolic nuncio to Bangladesh (Diocese of Norwich)
- Peter Brian Wells, apostolic nuncio to Thailand, Cambodia, and Laos (Diocese of Tulsa)

=== Bishops emeriti who served in the Diplomatic Corps of the Holy See ===
- Edward Joseph Adams, apostolic nuncio emeritus to Great Britain (Archdiocese of Philadelphia)
- Michael A. Blume, S.V.D., apostolic nuncio emeritus to Hungary (Chicago Province of the Society of the Divine Word)
- James Green, apostolic nuncio emeritus to Iceland, Sweden, Denmark, Finland, and Norway (Archdiocese of Philadelphia)
- Thomas Edward Gullickson, apostolic nuncio emeritus to Switzerland and Liechtenstein (Diocese of Sioux Falls)
- Joseph Marino, president emeritus of the Pontifical Ecclesiastical Academy (Diocese of Birmingham)

=== Bishops serving in foreign sees ===
- Christopher Cardone, O.P., archbishop of Honiara (Solomon Islands)
- Arthur Colgan, C.S.C., auxiliary bishop of Chosica (Peru)
- Robert Herman Flock, bishop of San Ignacio de Velasco (Bolivia)

=== Bishops emeriti who served in a foreign see ===
- Gordon Bennett, S.J., bishop emeritus of Mandeville (Jamaica)
- Robert J. Kurtz, C.R., bishop emeritus of Hamilton in Bermuda
- Daniel Thomas Turley Murphy, O.S.A., bishop emeritus of Chulucanas, Peru

== Non-American bishops serving in the United States ==
- Gabriele Giordano Caccia, apostolic nuncio to the U.S. (Nunciature of the Holy See in Washington, D.C.)
- [vacant] — Permanent Observer of the Holy See to the United Nations

== See also ==
- Appointment of Catholic bishops
- Catholic Church and politics in the United States
- Catholic Church by country
- Catholic Church in the United States
- Christianity in the United States
- Global organisation of the Catholic Church
- Hierarchy of the Catholic Church
- Historical list of the Catholic bishops of Puerto Rico
- Historical list of the Catholic bishops of the United States
- History of the Catholic Church in the United States
- List of Catholic cathedrals in the United States
- List of Catholic dioceses in the United States
- List of Catholic dioceses in North America § Episcopal Conference of the United States of America
- List of Catholic apostolic administrations
- List of Catholic archdioceses (by country and continent)
- List of Catholic dioceses (alphabetical)
- List of Catholic dioceses (structured view) (including episcopal conferences and USCCB regions)
- List of Catholic military dioceses
- List of Catholic titular sees

== Resources ==
- "List of Bishops". United States Conference of Catholic Bishops.
- "GCatholic Bishops".
