= List of churches in the Diocese of San Bernardino =

This is a list of current and former Roman Catholic churches in the Roman Catholic Diocese of San Bernardino. The diocese comprises Riverside and San Bernardino Counties in the Southern California. The diocese has 91 parishes, seven missions and five chapels. The mother church for the diocese is Our Lady of the Rosary Cathedral in San Bernardino.

== Riverside County ==
=== City of Riverside ===
Name	Image	Location	Description/Notes
Our Lady of Guadalupe Mission (Belltown)		2518 Hall Ave, Riverside	
Our Lady of Guadalupe Shrine		2858 Ninth St, Riverside	
Our Lady of Perpetual Help		5250 Central Ave, Riverside	
Queen of Angels		4824 Jones Ave, Riverside	
Sacred Heart		9935 Mission Blvd, Riverside	
St. Andrew Kim		4750 Challen Ave, Riverside	
St. Andrew Newman Center		105 W Big Springs Rd, Riverside	
St. Anthony		3074 Madison St, Riverside	
St. Catherine of Alexandria		3680 Arlington Ave, Riverside	
St. Francis de Sales		4268 Lime St, Riverside	
St. John the Evangelist		3980 Opal St, Riverside	
St. Thomas the Apostle		3774 Jackson St, Riverside	

=== Coachella Valley ===
Name	Image	Location	Description/Notes
Christ of the Desert		Palm Desert	
Our Lady of Guadalupe		Palm Springs	
Our Lady of Perpetual Help		Indio	
Our Lady of Soledad		Coachella	
Our Lady of Solitude		Palm Springs	
Sacred Heart		Palm Desert	
Sacred Hearts of Mary & Jesus Chapel		Thermal	
St. Elizabeth of Hungary		Desert Hot Springs	
St. Francis of Assisi		La Quinta	
St. Louis		Cathedral City	
St. Theresa		Palm Springs	
San Felipe de Jesus Mission		Thermal	
El Senor de la Misericordia		Thermal	

=== West County ===
Name	Image	Location	Description/Notes
Corpus Christi		Corona	
Holy Spirit		Hemet	
Our Lady of the Snows Chapel		Anza	
Our Lady of the Valley		Hemet	
Sacred Heart		Anza	
St. Anthony		San Jacinto	
St. Catherine of Alexandria		Temecula	
St. Christopher		Moreno Valley	
St. Edward		Corona	
St. Francis of Rome		Wildomar	
St. James		Perris	
St. Joseph Mission		San Jacinto	
St. Martha		Murrieta	
St. Mary Magdalene		Corona	
St. Matthew		Corona	
St. Mel		Norco	
St. Michael Chapel		Temecula	
St. Mother Teresa of Calcutta		Winchester	
St. Oscar Romero		Eastvale	
St. Patrick		Moreno Valley	
St. Rose of Lima Chapel		Anza	
St. Vincent Ferrer		Sun City	

=== Riverside County (other) ===
Name	Image	Location	Description/Notes
Queen of Angels		Idyllwild	
St. Joan of Arc		Blythe	
St. Kateri Tekakwith		Banning	
St. Mary Chapel		Banning	
Sanctuary of Our Lady of Guadalupe		Mecca	

== San Bernardino County ==
=== City of San Bernardino ===
Name	Image	Location	Description/Notes
Our Lady of Guadalupe		San Bernardino	
Our Lady of Hope Catholic Community, Inc.		San Bernardino	
Our Lady of the Assumption		San Bernardino	
Our Lady of the Rosary Cathedral		San Bernardino	Seat of the Archdiocese
St. Anthony		San Bernardino	
St. Bernardine		San Bernardino	

=== Southwest County (I-10 corridor) ===
Name	Image	Location	Description/Notes
Christ the Redeemer		Grand Terrace	
Holy Name of Jesus		Redlands	
Immaculate Conception		Colton	
Our Lady of Guadalupe		Chino	
Our Lady of Guadalupe		Ontario	
Our Lady of Mount Carmel		Rancho Cucamonga	
Sacred Heart		Rancho Cucamonga	
St. Adelaide		Highland	
St. Anthony		Upland	
St. Catherine of Siena		Rialto	
St. Elizabeth Ann Seton		Ontario	
St. Francis Xavier Cabrini		Yucaipa	
St. John Bosco Mission		Highland	
St. George		Ontario	
St. Joseph		Fontana	
St. Joseph		Upland	
St. Joseph the Worker		Loma Linda	
St. Margaret Mary		Chino	
St. Mary		Fontana	
St. Paul the Apostle		Chino Hills	
Ss. Peter and Paul		Alta Loma	
San Salvador		Colton	
San Secondo d'Asti		Guasti	

=== Victor Valley ===
Name	Image	Location	Description/Notes
Christ the Good Shepherd		Adelanto	
Holy Family		Hesperia	
Holy Innocents		Victorville	
Our Lady of the Desert		Apple Valley	
St. Joan of Arc		Victorville	
St. Junipero Serra		Phelan	
St. Paul		Lucerne Valley	

=== San Bernardino National Forest ===
Name	Image	Location	Description/Notes
Our Lady of the Lake		Lake Arrowhead	
Our Lady of the Snows		Wrightwood	
St. Anne in the Mountains		Running Springs	
St. Francis Xavier Cabrini		Crestline	
St. George		Fontana	
St. John XXIII Catholic Community, Inc.		Fontana	
St. Joseph		Big Bear	

=== San Bernardino County (other) ===
Name	Image	Location	Description/Notes
Blessed Sacrament		Twentynine Palms	
St. Ann		Needles	
St. Charles Borromeo		Bloomington	
St. Joseph		Barstow	
St. Madeline Sophie Barat		Trona	
St. Mary of the Valley		Yucca Valley	
St. Philip Neri (Lenwood)		Barstow	
