= Arrowview, San Bernardino =

- Neighborhood community
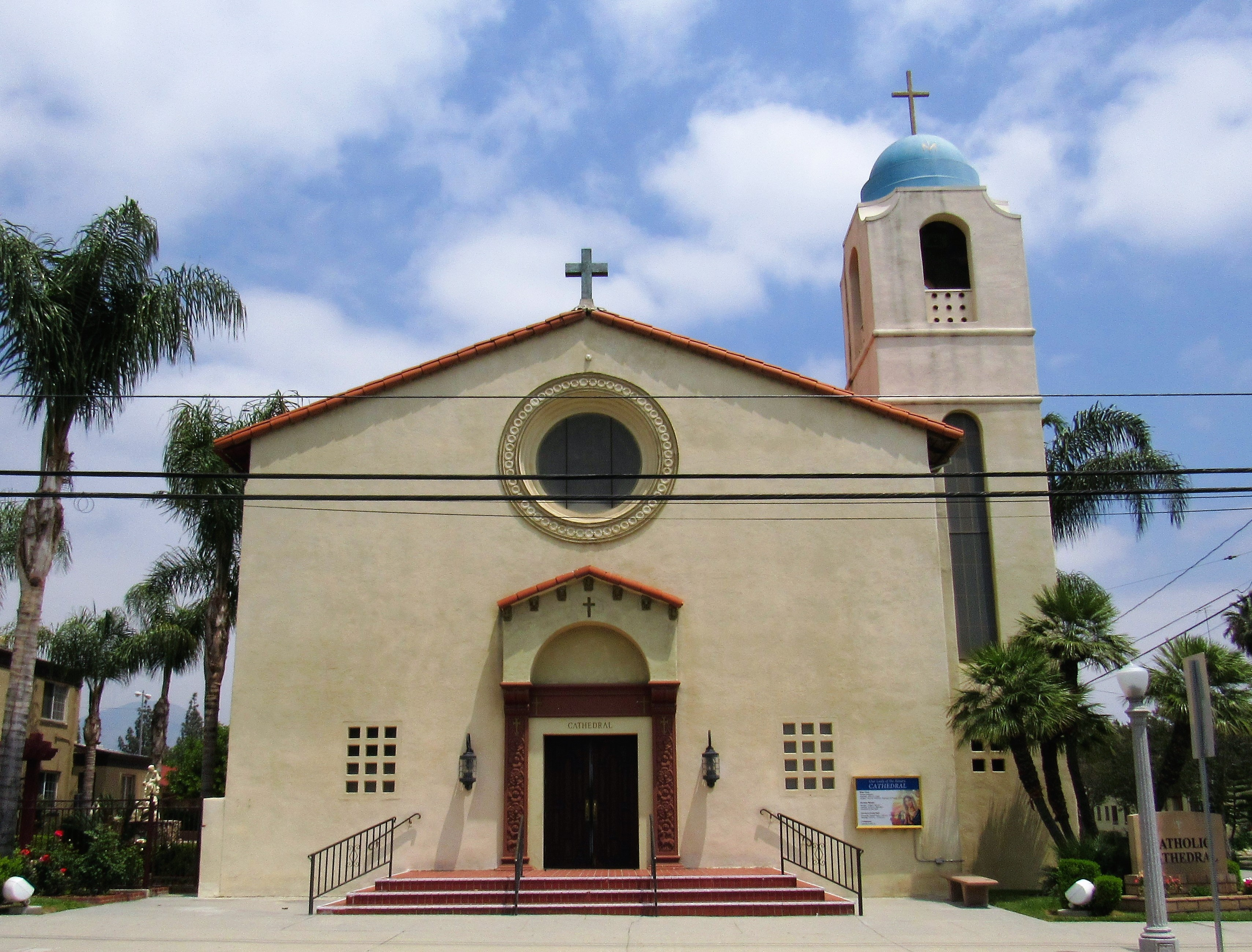
- Our Lady of the Rosary Cathedral, the seat of the Diocese of San Bernardino in Arrowview
- Nickname: Uptown
- Location of the Arrowview, San Bernardino in California
- Coordinates: 34°10′44″N 117°19′37″W
- Country: United States
- State: California
- County: San Bernardino
- City: San Bernardino
- Elevation: 1,486 ft (453 m)

Population (2024)
  - Total: 3,453
- Time zone: UTC-8 (PST)
  - Summer (DST): UTC-7 (PDT)

Arrowview is a neighborhood in the city of San Bernardino, California. Arrowview is similar to other San Bernardino neighborhoods in that the boundaries are informal; by common usage, Arrowview is bounded on the west by State Route 259; on the east by Mountain View Avenue; on the south by Highland Avenue ;and on the north by the Foothill Freeway. Its main commercial streets are Highland Avenue, Arrowhead Avenue, and "E" street. The Our Lady of the Rosary Cathedral, the seat of the Diocese of San Bernardino is located in the neighborhood.

== Education ==
Arrowview lies completely within the San Bernardino City Unified School District. George Brown Elementary School and Arrowview Middle School are the only public schools located in the neighborhood. San Bernardino High School is the high school that serves the area. Arrowview is also home to Holy Rosary Academy and Preschool, a private catholic PreK-8 school.
