= Rutilio del Riego Jáñez =

Spanish-born American Catholic bishop (born 1940)

His Excellency, The Most Reverend Rutilio del Riego Jáñez
- Auxiliary Bishop Emeritus of San Bernardino
- See: Diocese of San Bernardino
- Appointed: July 26, 2005
- Installed: September 20, 2005
- Retired: December 11, 2015
- Other post: Titular Bishop of Daimlaig

Orders
- Ordination: June 5, 1965 by William Joseph McDonald
- Consecration: September 20, 2005 by Gerald Richard Barnes, Ricardo Ramírez, and Cipriano Calderón Polo

Personal details
- Born: September 21, 1940 (age 85) Valdesandinas, Spain
- Education: Pontifical University of Salamanca; Catholic University of America
- Motto: Omnibus servire in caritate (To serve all with love)

Styles of Rutilio del Riego Jáñez
- Reference style: His Excellency; The Most Reverend
- Spoken style: Your Excellency
- Religious style: Bishop

Rutilio del Riego Jáñez (born September 21, 1940) is a Spanish-born American prelate of the Roman Catholic Church. Del Riego Jáñez served as an auxiliary bishop for the Diocese of San Bernardino in California from 2005 to 2015.

== Biography ==
=== Early life ===
Born in Valdesandinas, Spain on September 21, 1940, del Riego Jáñez joined La Hermandad de Sacerdotes Operarios Diocesanos del Sagrado Corazón de Jesús in 1961. He studied theology at the Pontifical University of Salamanca in Spain, then went to Washington, D.C. to attend Catholic University of America. He received a licentiate and a Master of Arts degree from Catholic University.

=== Priesthood ===
On June 5, 1965, del Riego Jáñez was ordained into the priesthood for his religious order by Auxiliary Bishop William McDonald at the Basilica of the National Shrine of the Immaculate Conception in Washington, D.C.

After his ordination, del Riego Jáñez, served as an instructor at Saint Vincent College in Latrobe, Pennsylvania and director of the Office of Vocations at the Northeast Catholic Pastoral Center in New York City. While in Washington, he headed the Spanish Catholic Center, was associate director of the Sol Vocational Institute and director of the diocesan Laborer Priests House of Formation. Del Riego Jáñez also served as delegate for the United States for the Diocesan Laborer Priests.

In Texas, del Riego Jáñez served as director of the Office of Vocations at the Mexican American Cultural Center in San Antonio; and pastor of Santa Lucia Parish and San Antonio de Padua Parish, both in El Paso, Texas.

In 1999, del Riego Jáñez moved to the Diocese of San Bernardino. He served as parochial vicar and pastor at Our Lady of Perpetual Help Parish in Riverside, California. He also served as vicar forane for the Riverside Vicariate and as a member of the Presbyteral Council.

=== Auxiliary Bishop of San Bernardino ===
On June 26, 2005, del Riego Jáñez was appointed titular bishop of Daimlaig and auxiliary bishop of San Bernardino by Pope Benedict XVI. He was consecrated on September 20, 2005, by Bishop Gerald Barnes at Saint Paul the Apostle Catholic Church in Chino Hills, California.

On December 11, 2015, Pope Francis accepted del Riego Jáñez's letter of resignation as auxiliary bishop of San Bernardino.

Catholic Church titles
Preceded by Dennis Patrick O'Neil	Auxiliary Bishop of San Bernardino; 2005–2015	Succeeded by -
