= Holy Name of Jesus Church (Redlands, California) =

- Holy Name of Jesus Church
- 34°4′7″N 117°11′18″W
- Location: 1214 Columbia St. & 115 W. Olive Avenue, Redlands, California
- Country: United States
- Denomination: Roman Catholic
- Website: theholynameofjesus.org

History
- Former name: Saint Mary's / Sacred Heart / Lady of Mercy
- Founded: July 1, 2006
- Dedication: Holy Name of Jesus

Administration
- District: Southwest County (I-10)
- Province: Los Angeles
- Diocese: San Bernardino

Clergy
- Archbishop: José Horacio Gómez
- Bishop: Most Rev. Alberto Rojas
- Vicar(s): Rev. Thomas Davis, Rev. Ismael Valenzuela
- Pastor(s): Rev. Erik Esparza, JCL

Holy Name of Jesus Parish is a Roman Catholic church in Redlands, California, United States, founded on July 1, 2006. It is part of the Diocese of San Bernardino. The Church is located on two sites, on the north side of town is the Columbia Street location formerly Saint Mary's Catholic Church. And the south side of Redlands, at the Olive Avenue location is the former Sacred Heart Catholic Church.

== History ==
The first known Christian settlement in Redlands, CA. was the catholic San Bernardino de Sena Estancia. Established in 1819 on the feast day of Saint Bernardine by friars from the Mission San Gabriel Arcángel located 56 miles away near Los Angeles, CA., a days trip by horse and wagon. It was primarily used as a cattle barn and a horse stable but also used to convert local native Tongva, Serrano, and Cahuilla Native Americans to christianity. Other than the nearby village of Kaawchama, with no other large populations in the area, Spanish colonist considered it unsuitable for an actual mission. The estancia was later sold to José del Carmen Lugo who made it his home.

Also in the nearby canyon of San Timoteo, early settlers built a small one room adobe chapel in 1875 to worship. The chapel was on the corner of what is San Timoteo Canyon Road and Live Oak Canyon Road in what is now Redlands. Prior to the chapel, local canyon residents worshiped in their homes and a priest from Agua Mansa would occasionally ride into the canyon to deliver mass. By the 1880s, most families had moved closer into Redlands and the need for mass their diminished. The adobe chapel was abandoned.

=== Sacred Heart ===
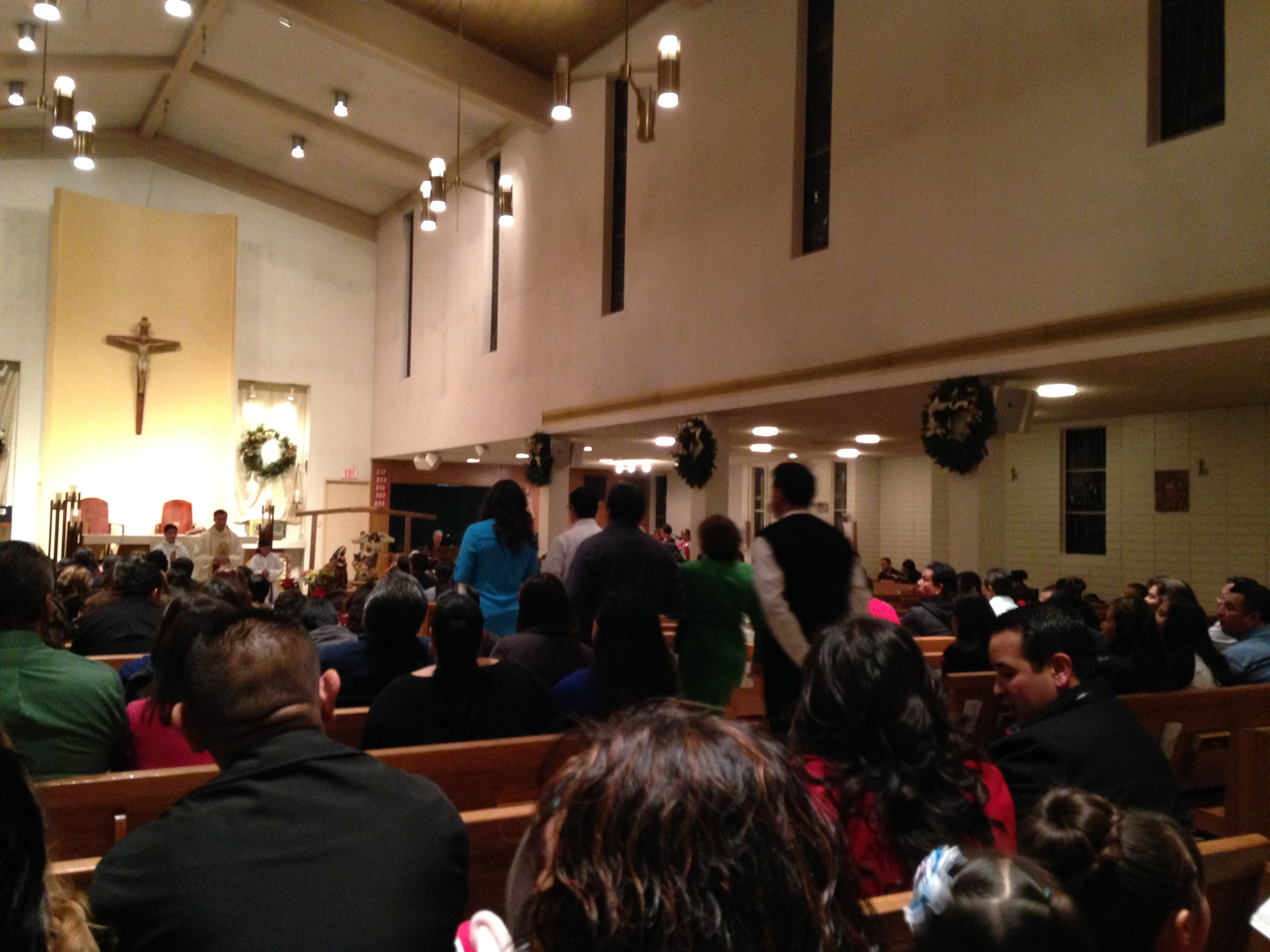
Olive Ave. location interior during Christmas Mass. (formally Sacred Heart)

After American annexation in 1848, large amounts of European-Americans arrived, Redlands was officially incorporated in 1881 and many European Americans from the east coast, Californios and Mexican Catholics moved into the area there after. Before any specific place of worship was constructed, community members worshiped in a local community center, local homes and local rented store fronts for $10 a month. The first chapel was small, opened as Sacred Heart Catholic Parish, its first mass was delivered on April 1, 1894. The Catholic School Academy opened in 1897. This is what is now known as the Olive Avenue location site. The current church was re-constructed in 1963 in Postmodern architecture.

=== Saint Mary's ===
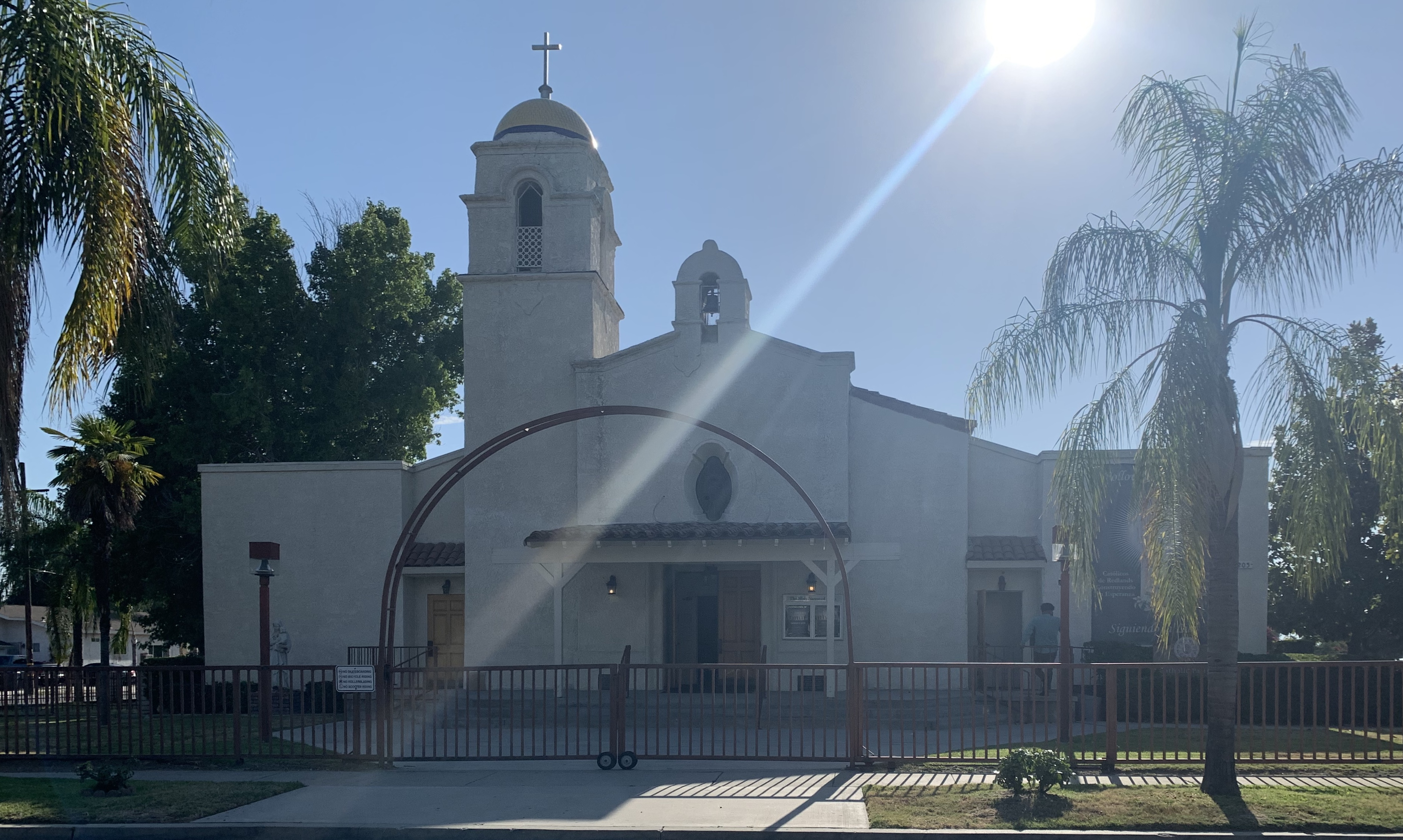
Facade of the Columbia St. location in 2020. (formally St. Mary's)

A new Redlands parish was founded by the Mexican-American community residing in the north area of Redlands in 1920, mostly by not feeling welcomed at Sacred Heart parish. Monsignor Thomas Fitzgerald purchased land in the surrounding orange groves. They constructed a small chapel and named it Our Lady of Mercy Catholic Parish. The church female elders, aka "Doñas" raised funds to construct a new larger church by 1938. Selling "Conchas and tamales" to raise funds. The current church was built and renamed St. Mary's in 1941, then physically moved from Calhoun St. to its current location on Columbia Street in 1986. Built in Mission Revival architecture.

=== Friars and Nuns ===
The Discalced Carmelite Friars of the California-Arizona Province established a retreat campus in Redlands in 1952, The Carmelo Retreat House. Located adjacent to Ford Street Park. The Sisters of Mercy lived at the historic Burrage Mansion from 1934 to 1974. The estate served as a convent for the Catholic order of missionary nuns known as the Victory Noll Sisters. As of 2026, the nuns currently remain in Redlands in a home adjacent the Carmelites retreat property.

== Merger & Relocation ==
The diocese of San Bernardino was concerned with the concept of one community with two separate churches. Historically, each location self segregated in the 1930s. Mostly to accommodate anglo parishioners, who dissuaded hispanics from attending Sacred Heart Church. To amend this, the diocese decided to create one sole catholic community in the City of Redlands to create unity, simplicity for worshipers and the church. They established the Holy Name of Jesus Catholic Church in 2006. Named ‘’Iglesia Catolica Santo Nombre de Jesus’’ in Spanish. Among the highlights of the merger, the parishioners hold a yearly traditional Marian procession from Columbia St. to mass at the Olive Ave. location on Our Lady of Guadalupe feast day, December 12. The 1.5 mile procession thru downtown Redlands with help from local authorities. Mostly traffic control.

Plans to build a new church were officially announced in 2015 when the parish purchased a vacant lot and began to raise funds to relocate. The lot is located in north Redlands, a former Christmas tree farm on the northwest corner of Lugonia Avenue and Dearborn Street. The released plans includes a three phase construction schedule, 35,000 square ft mission revival parish campus with a 1,500 person capacity main church to service over 3,000 registered families and a new educational campus for over 600 students. Phase one, includes the Marian Center main hall, gardens, parish offices, a central kitchen, a youth center, parking infrastructure and an outdoor amphitheater. Phase one broke ground on March 1st, 2025 with Bishop Alberto Rojas and over 700 parishioners present. The cost is budgeted at $26.4 million. Phase two will include the main church, adoration chapel and bell tower. The academy classrooms and a sports complex are in phase three. Plans remain to sell its current church location sites and other church properties to begin phase two at a later date.

== Former clergy ==
- Father Joseph Felker - 1994 to 2004 - Sacred Heart.
- Father Jose Cima - 1991 to 1997 - Saint Mary's.
- Rev. Father Charles "Gino" Galley (2016 to 2022)
