= Our Lady of the Desert School =

Location
- 55765 Mountain View Trail; Yucca Valley, (San Bernardino County), California 92284; United States; 34°06′29″N 116°26′52″W

Information
- Type: Private, Coeducational
- Religious affiliation: Roman Catholic
- Established: 1983
- Principal: Daniel Foran
- Staff: 3
- Faculty: 3
- Grades: K-12
- Student to teacher ratio: 4:1
- Campus size: 5 acres (2.0 ha)
- Tuition: $4,000 (K-5); $3,000 (6-8); $3,250 (9-12)

Our Lady of the Desert School (OLDS) is a coeducational private school combination Elementary, Middle School and High school located in Yucca Valley, San Bernardino County, California, USA. It was founded in 1983, and owns its own facility, which includes a 280-occupancy chapel and tennis courts, on 5 acres (20,000 m^{2}) of land. The school is orthodox Catholic in curriculum and administration. It is not affiliated with the Roman Catholic Diocese of San Bernardino.

Currently, OLDS has 12 students and 3 teachers, with additional administration and support staff. This gives it a 4:1 student-to-teacher ratio; the California average is 16. The Principal is Daniel Foran.

It describes its primary purpose as preparing students for the challenges they will face in this life so to get to heaven with education as a means to that end.
