= Randolph Roque Calvo =

American prelate

His Excellency, The Most Reverend Randolph Roque Calvo
- Bishop emeritus of Reno
- Diocese: Reno
- Appointed: December 23, 2005
- Installed: February 17, 2006
- Retired: July 20, 2021
- Predecessor: Phillip Francis Straling
- Successor: Daniel Henry Mueggenborg

Orders
- Ordination: May 21, 1977 by John Raphael Quinn
- Consecration: February 17, 2006 by George Hugh Niederauer, Phillip Francis Straling, and John Charles Wester

Personal details
- Born: August 28, 1950 (age 76) Agana, Guam
- Education: St. Joseph College Seminary; Pontifical University of St. Thomas Aquinas
- Motto: Come Creator Spirit

Styles of Randolph Roque Calvo
- Reference style: His Excellency; The Most Reverend
- Spoken style: Your Excellency
- Religious style: Bishop

Randolph Roque Calvo (born August 28, 1950) is an American prelate of the Roman Catholic Church. Calvo served as the seventh bishop of the Diocese of Reno in Nevada from 2006 until 2021.

== Biography ==
=== Early life ===
Randolph Calvo was born on August 28, 1951, in Agaña, Guam, the youngest of seven children. The family later moved to San Francisco where he attended elementary school. Calvo completed his clerical formation at Saint Joseph College Seminary in Mountain View, California, and at Saint Patrick Seminary in Menlo Park, California.

In 1986, Calvo earned a Doctor of Canon Law degree at the Pontifical University of St. Thomas Aquinas (Angelicum) in Rome with a dissertation entitled Consultation and the Presbyterial Council: new emphasis in the ratio legis.

=== Priesthood ===
On May 21, 1977, Calvo was ordained by Archbishop John Raphael Quinn as a priest for the Archdiocese of San Francisco. After his ordination, Calvo was assigned as parochial vicar at Holy Name of Jesus Parish in San Francisco. In 1979, he was moved to Saint Pius Parish in Redwood City California.

In 1982, Calvo went to Rome to study canon law. He returned in 1986 to San Francisco to serve as adjutant judicial vicar of the archdiocesan tribunal. In 1987, he became judicial vicar. In 1997, Calvo was appointed pastor of Our Lady of Mount Carmel Parish in Redwood City. He also taught canon law at St Patrick' Seminary and University in Menlo Park, California.

=== Bishop of Reno ===
On December 23, 2005, Pope Benedict VI appointed Calvo as bishop of the Diocese of Reno. He was consecrated on February 17, 2006, at the Hilton Hotel Pavilion in Reno, Nevada. Archbishop George H. Neiderauer was the principal consecrator, accompanied by co-consecrators Bishop Phillip F. Straling and Bishop John C. Wester.

On September 30, 2009, Calvo was named in a lawsuit by Reverend Richard DeMolen, the former pastor of Our Lady of Tahoe Catholic Parish in Zephyr Cove, Nevada. Calvo had fired DeMolen because the priest had refused to remove a restraining order he filed against a diocesan deacon. DeMolen claimed the deacon had sent him a death threat, which Calvo allegedly never investigated. The lawsuit was dismissed on April 11, 2010.

On October 22, 2010, Calvo placed Reverend Tom Cronin from St. Mary’s in the Mountains Parish in Virginia City, Nevada, on leave due to a sexual abuse allegation from Missouri. On October 1, 2010, Calvo had read that Cronin was being sued in Kansas City, Missouri, by a woman who claimed he molested her at age 17 in Hamilton, Missouri. Calvo was criticized for not suspending Cronin immediately.

=== Retirement ===
On July 20, 2021, Calvo submitted his letter of resignation as bishop of Reno to Pope Francis. The pope named Auxiliary Bishop Daniel H. Mueggenborg as Calvo's successor.

== Coat of Arms ==
Calvo's coat of arms depicts in the dexter impalement the diocesan arms of Reno. The sinister impalement depicts the Golden Gate Bridge, symbolizing the San Francisco Bay Area where he exercised his presbyteral ministry. The bridge is placed over a field of wavy lines symbolic of Calvo's affinity to the water and the outdoor environment. In base a latte stone for Guam, where he was born. His episcopal motto, "Come Creator Spirit," is placed at the bottom of the shield and derives from the ancient hymn attributed to Rabanus Maurus, Veni Creator Spiritus.

== Gallery ==
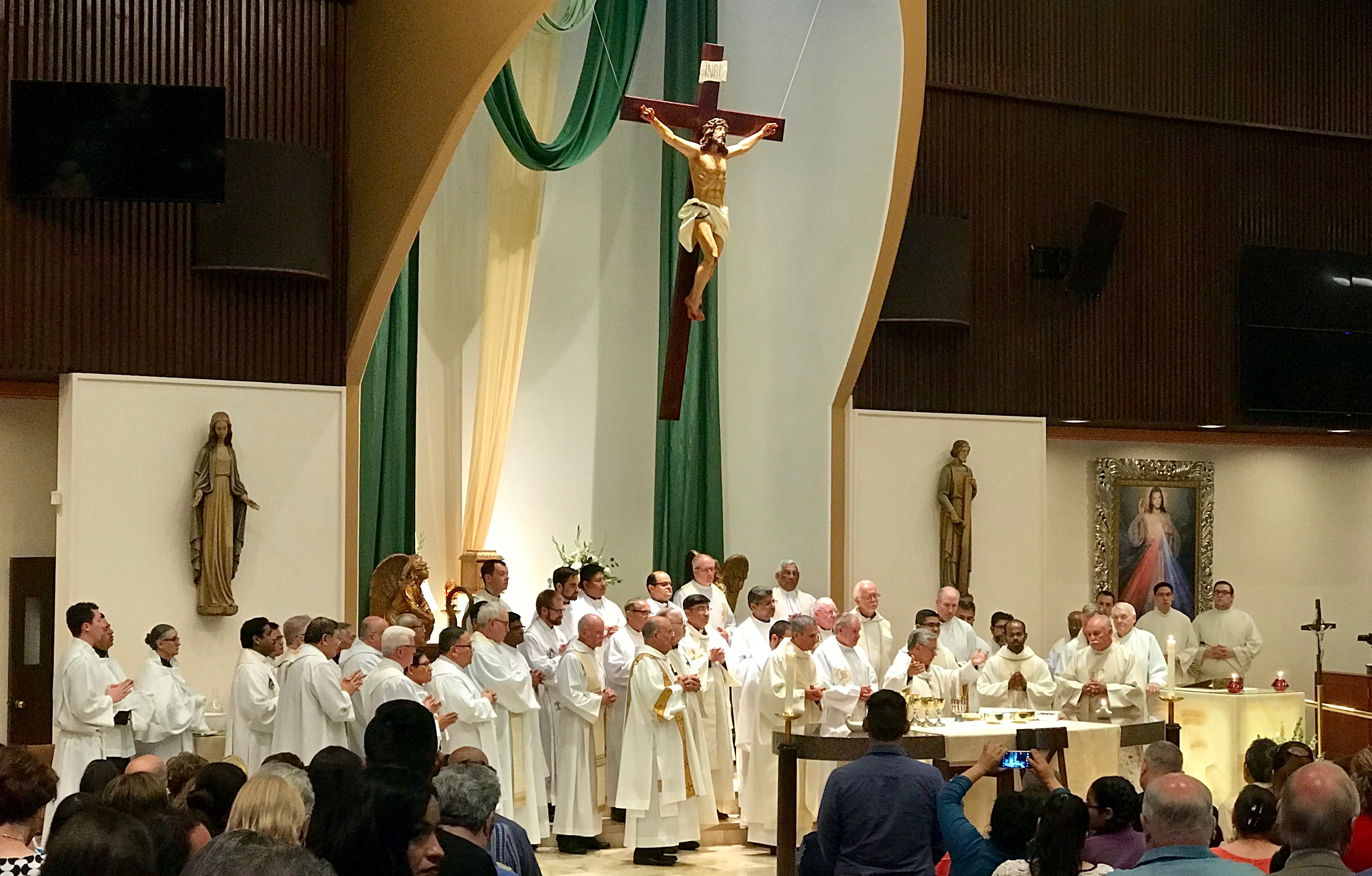
Bishop Calvo ordaining Father Lucio Zuniga Rocha at the Saint Therese of the Little Flower Catholic Church in Reno.

== See also ==
- Catholic Church hierarchy
- Catholic Church in the United States
- Historical list of the Catholic bishops of the United States
- List of Catholic bishops of the United States
- Lists of patriarchs, archbishops, and bishops

Catholic Church titles
Preceded by Phillip Francis Straling	Bishop of Reno; 2006–2021	Succeeded by Daniel Mueggenborg
