= Dennis Patrick O'Neil =

His Excellency, The Most Reverend Dennis Patrick O'Nei
- Auxiliary Bishop of San Bernardino; Titular Bishop of Mâcon
- Church: Roman Catholic Church
- See: Diocese of San Bernardino
- Other post: Titular Bishop of Mâcon

Orders
- Ordination: April 30, 1966
- Consecration: March 27, 2001 by Gerald Richard Barnes

Personal details
- Born: January 16, 1940 Fremont, Nebraska, US
- Died: October 17, 2003 (aged 63)
- Education: St. John's Seminary

Styles of Dennis Patrick O'Neil
- Reference style: The Most Reverend
- Spoken style: Your Excellency
- Religious style: Monsignor

Dennis Patrick O'Neil (January 16, 1940 – October 17, 2003) was an American prelate of the Roman Catholic Church. He served as an auxiliary bishop of the Diocese of San Bernardino in California from 2001 until his death in 2003

== Biography ==
=== Early life ===
Born on January 16, 1940, in Fremont, Nebraska, Dennis O'Neil grew up in Southern California. He attended St. John's Seminary in Camarillo, California.

O'Neil was ordained a priest for the Archdiocese of Los Angeles on April 30, 1966. After serving pastoral positions in the archdiocese from 1966 to 1979, he spent five years on a missionary assignment in the Diocese of Juneau in Alaska. After returning to Los Angeles, O'Neil became administrator and pastor of St. Thomas the Apostle Parish in 1984. He served on the archdiocesan clergy personnel board from 1990 to 1998, and was appointed pastor of St. Emydius Parish in Lynewood, California in 1998.

=== Auxiliary Bishop of San Bernardino ===
On January 16, 2001, O'Neil was appointed by Pope John Paul II as an auxiliary bishop of the Diocese of San Bernardino and titular bishop of Mâcon. He was consecrated on March 27, 2001. Bishop Gerald Barnes was his principal consecrator, and Bishops Gabino Zavala and Stephen Blaire were his principal co-consecrators.

Dennis O'Neil died of an apparent heart attack on October 17, 2003, at the age of 63.
