= Phillip Francis Straling =

American prelate

His Excellency, The Most Reverend Phillip Francis Straling DD
- Bishop Emeritus of Reno
- Church: Catholic Church
- Diocese: Reno
- Appointed: March 21, 1995
- Installed: June 29, 1995
- Retired: June 21, 2005
- Predecessor: Daniel F. Walsh
- Successor: Randolph Roque Calvo
- Previous post: Bishop of San Bernardino (1978-1995)

Orders
- Ordination: March 19, 1959 by Charles Francis Buddy
- Consecration: November 6, 1978 by Timothy Manning, John R. Quinn, and Leo Thomas Maher

Personal details
- Born: April 25, 1933 (age 93) San Bernardino, California

Styles of Phillip Francis Straling
- Reference style: His Excellency; The Most Reverend
- Spoken style: Your Excellency
- Religious style: Bishop

Ordination history of Phillip Francis Straling
History
Episcopal consecration
- Consecrated by: Timothy Manning
Episcopal succession
Bishops consecrated by Phillip Francis Straling as principal consecrator
- Gerald Richard Barnes: March 18, 1992

Phillip Francis Straling (born April 25, 1933) is an American prelate of the Roman Catholic Church. He served as bishop of the Diocese of San Bernardino in California from 1978 to 1995, and as Bishop of the Diocese of Reno in Nevada from 1995 to 2005.

== Biography ==
=== Early life and ministry ===
Phillip Straling was born on April 25, 1933, in San Bernardino, California. He was ordained into the priesthood in San Diego, California, by Bishop Charles Buddy for the Diocese of San Diego on March 19, 1959. He served 11 years in campus ministry before serving as executive secretary of the second Synod of the diocese. In 1976, Straling was named pastor of Holy Rosary Parish in San Bernardino.

=== Bishop of San Bernardino ===
On July 14, 1978, Pope Paul VI named Straling as the first bishop of San Bernardino. He was consecrated in Riverside, California, on November 6, 1978, by Cardinal Timothy Manning. The co-consecrators were Archbishop John Quinn and Bishop Leo Maher.

During Straling's episcopate, the diocese grew from about 235,000 people to 800,000, and from 85 parishes to 105. He established a permanent diaconate program, and started the Straling Institute in 1980 for laymen. On January 28, 1992, Pope John Paul II named Gerald Barnes as the first auxiliary bishop of the diocese and Straling consecrated him on March 18 of the same year.

=== Bishop of Reno ===
On March 21, 1995, John Paul II divided the Diocese of Reno-Las Vegas into two dioceses and appointed Straling as bishop of the new Diocese of Reno. He was installed on June 29, 1995, and served there for ten years.

=== Retirement ===
Pope Benedict XVI accepted Straling's letter of resignation as bishop of Reno on June 21, 2005.

== See also ==
- Catholic Church hierarchy
- Catholic Church in the United States
- Historical list of the Catholic bishops of the United States
- List of Catholic bishops of the United States
- Lists of patriarchs, archbishops, and bishops

== Episcopal succession ==
Catholic Church titles
Preceded by First Bishop	Bishop of Reno; 1995–2005	Succeeded by Randolph Roque Calvo
Preceded by First Bishop	Bishop of San Bernardino; 1978–1995	Succeeded by Gerald Richard Barnes
