= Our Lady of the Rosary Cathedral (San Bernardino, California) =

Church in California

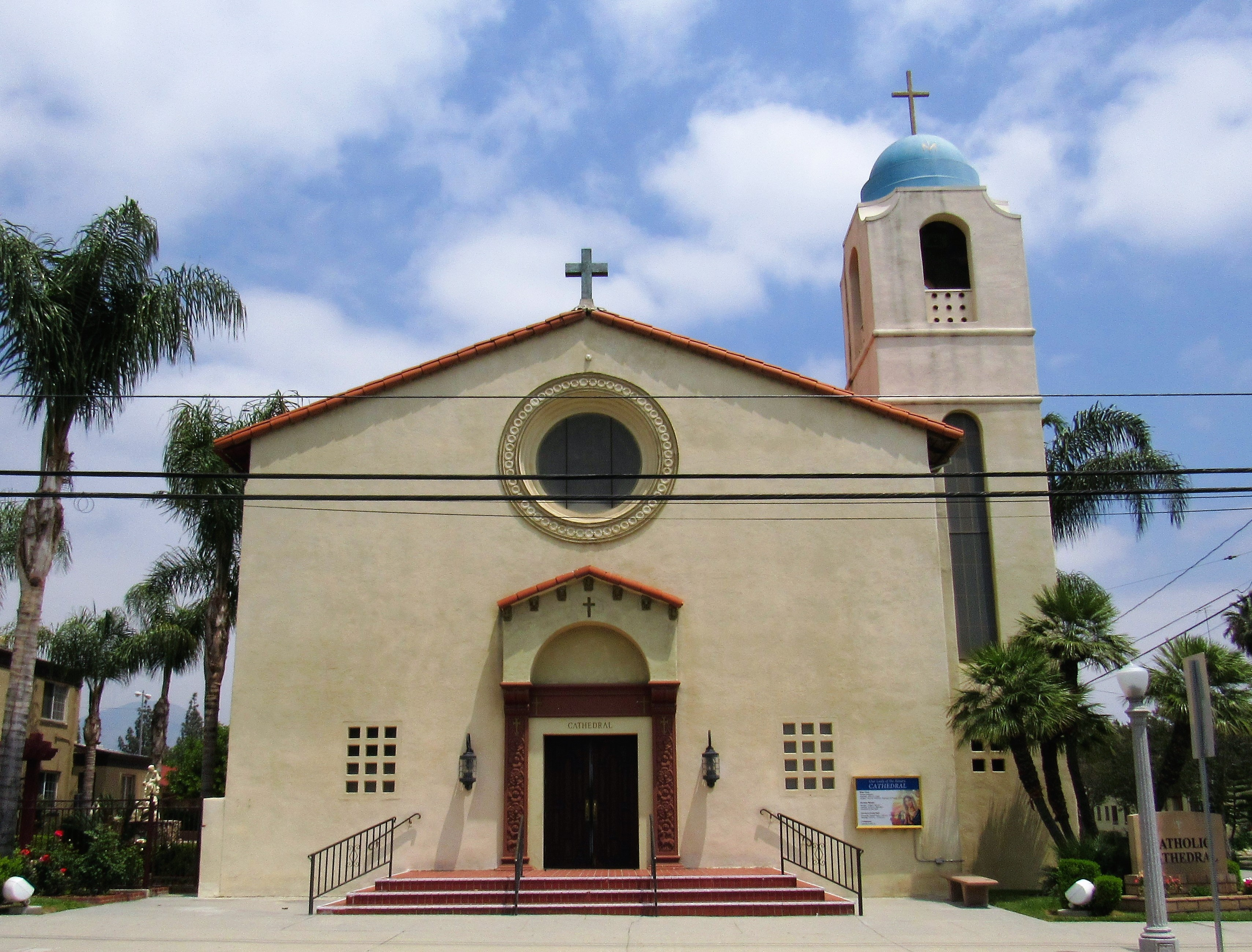

- Our Lady of the Rosary's location in Southern California
- 34°08′20″N 117°17′21″W
- Location: 265 W 25th St. San Bernardino, California
- Country: United States
- Denomination: Roman Catholic
- Website: sbdiocese.wix.com/cathedral

History
- Founded: 1927

Architecture
- Architectural type: Mission Revival
- Completed: 1928

Administration
- Diocese: San Bernardino

Clergy
- Bishop: Most Rev. Alberto Rojas
- Rector: Rev. Alex Gamino
- Vicar: Rev. Carlos Flores Guardado

Our Lady of the Rosary Cathedral is a Catholic cathedral located in San Bernardino, California. It is the seat of the Diocese of San Bernardino.

Our Lady of the Rosary Church was dedicated in 1928. When the Diocese of San Bernardino was erected in 1978, the church was designated as Our Lady of the Rosary Cathedral.

== History ==
=== Our Lady of the Rosary Church ===
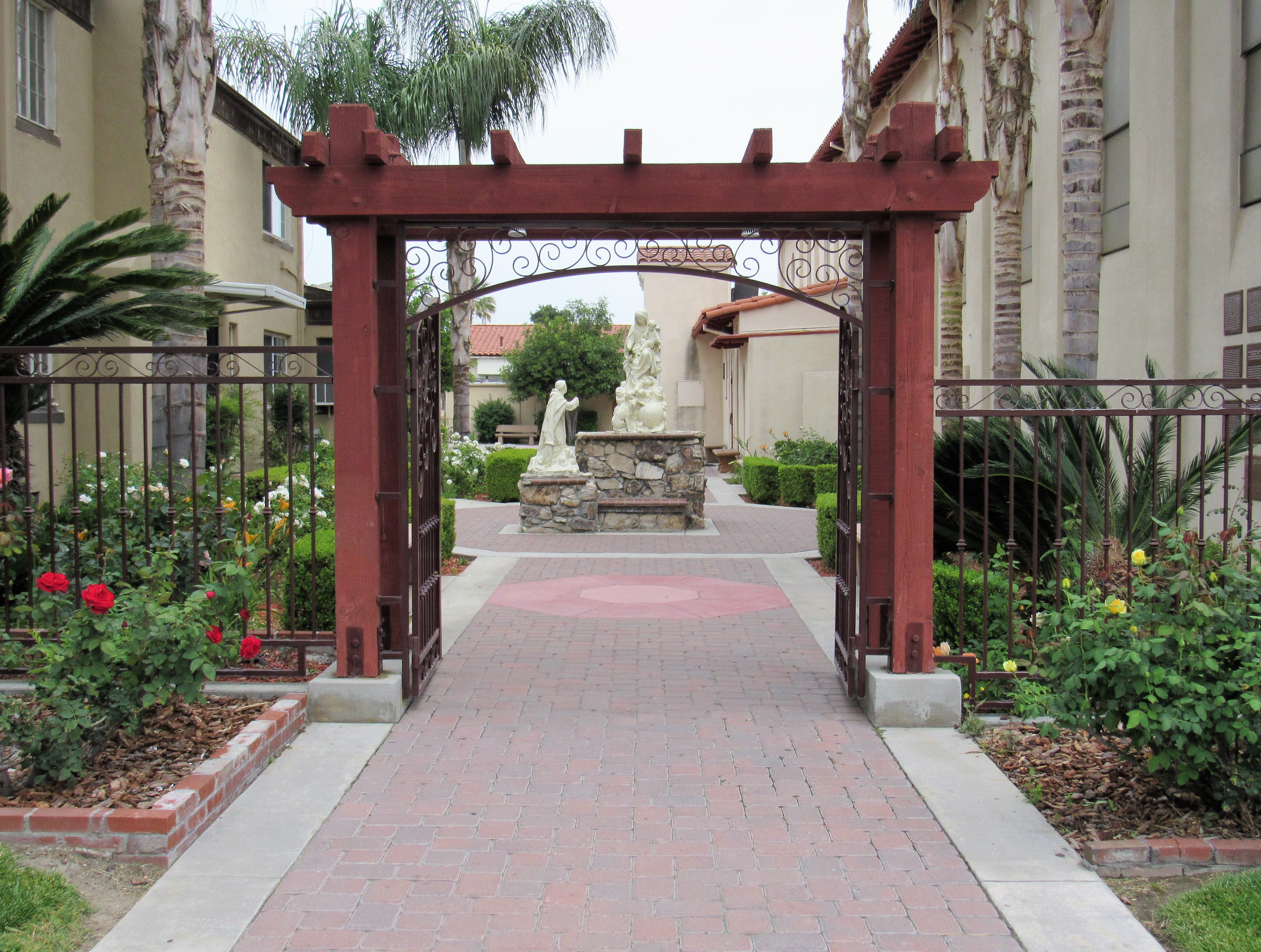
Courtyard, Our Lady of the Rosary Cathedral (2018)

Our Lady of the Rosary Parish was founded in 1927 by Bishop John Cantwell of Los Angeles. The first pastor assigned to the parish was Reverend Patrick Curran. A rented house on Sierra Way initially served as a combination church and rectory. Construction of the present church building began in May 1928. It was completed in the Mission Revival architectural style in September of the same year. The present rectory was built in 1936.

Our Lady of the Rosary School opened in 1947. The Dominican Sisters from Houston, Texas served as the faculty. The convent was built in 1950. The original school building was replaced with a new facility across the street from the old one. The church building was enlarged and expanded in 1953.

=== Our Lady of the Rosary Cathedral ===
On July 14, 1978, Pope Paul VI established the Diocese of San Bernardino. Our Lady of the Rosary Church was named as the cathedral for the new diocese.

The diocese in 1992 began a major expansion and renovation project of Our Lady. They constructed a new bell tower and new restrooms in the cathedral. Stucco was reapplied to the exterior of the cathedral and protective panels installed on the stained glass windows. The parish hall was refurbished and the parking lot expanded.

In 2021, the diocese started a renovation of the cathedral when it was empty due to the COVID-19 pandemic. They installed new lighting and sound systems, and refreshed the carpets and upholstery.

== See also ==
- List of Catholic cathedrals in the United States
- List of cathedrals in the United States
