= Gerald Richard Barnes =

American Catholic prelate (born 1945)

His Excellency, The Most Reverend Gerald Richard Barnes
- Bishop Emeritus of San Bernardino
- Diocese: San Bernardino
- Appointed: December 28, 1995
- Installed: March 12, 1996
- Retired: December 28, 2020
- Predecessor: Phillip Francis Straling
- Successor: Alberto Rojas
- Previous post: Auxiliary Bishop of San Bernardino and Titular Bishop of Montefiascone (1992-1996)

Orders
- Ordination: December 20, 1975 by Francis James Furey
- Consecration: March 18, 1992 by Phillip Francis Straling, Patrick Flores, and Curtis J. Guillory

Personal details
- Born: June 22, 1945 (age 81) Phoenix, Arizona, US
- Denomination: Catholic Church
- Education: California State University, Los Angeles; Assumption Seminary
- Motto: Amar es entregarse (Spanish for 'Love is a total gift of self')
- Styles
- Reference style: His Excellency; The Most Reverend
- Spoken style: Your Excellency
- Religious style: Bishop

Gerald Richard Barnes (born June 22, 1945) is an American Catholic prelate who served as Bishop of San Bernardino in California from 1996 to 2020 and as an auxiliary bishop from 1992 to 1996.

== Biography ==
Barnes was born on June 22, 1945, in Phoenix, Arizona, to George and Aurora Barnes. In 1946, the family moved to the Boyle Heights area of Los Angeles. The family opened a grocery store, where he and his siblings worked in their spare time. Barnes attended public schools for his primary education, then graduated from Theodore Roosevelt High School in Los Angeles.

Barnes entered California State University, Los Angeles, graduating in 1967 with a Bachelor of Political Science degree. He then attended seminaries in St. Louis, Missouri, Dayton, Ohio and Assumption Seminary in San Antonio, Texas.

=== Priesthood ===
On December 20, 1975, Barnes was ordained to the priesthood as St. Timothy Church in San Antonio, Texas, for the Archdiocese of San Antonio by Archbishop Francis Furey. In 1989, he was named by the Vatican as an honorary prelate with the title of monsignor. He also served as rector of Assumption Seminary.

=== Auxiliary Bishop of San Bernardino ===
On January 28, 1992, Pope John Paul II appointed Barnes as the first auxiliary bishop of the diocese of San Bernardino and titular bishop of Montefiascone. He was consecrated at St. Christopher Church in Moreno Valley, California, on March 18, 1992, by Bishop Philip Straling, with Archbishop Patrick Flores and Bishop Curtis Guillory serving as co-consecrators. Barnes selected as his episcopal motto: "Amar Es Entregarse", Spanish for "Love is a total gift of self".

With the installation of Straling as bishop of the Diocese of Reno in June 1995, the Vatican named Barnes as the apostolic administrator of San Bernardino.

=== Bishop of San Bernardino ===
On December 28, 1995, John Paul II appointed Barnes as the second bishop of San Bernardino. He was installed on March 12, 1996. In his episcopal ministry, Barnes established the 4 Core Values and explained the diocesan vision.

Within the United States Conference of Catholic Bishops (USCCB), Barnes chaired the Committee on Migration and Refugee Services. In that post, he described the "current immigration system" as responsible for "family separation, suffering, and even death" and "is morally unacceptable and must be reformed". He chaired the Committee on Hispanic Affairs from 1996 to 1999.

Under Barnes, the diocese operated three high schools, 23 elementary schools and three pre-schools. In 2001, Barnes inaugurated the annual Bishop's Golf Classic to fund scholarships to families unable to afford a Catholic education for their children. During his tenure, Barnes closed four primary schools in the California communities of Barstow, Banning, Apple Valley and San Bernardino.

In April 2003, the Diocese of San Bernardino filed a lawsuit against the Archdiocese of Boston. The diocese charged that the archdiocese gave them false information on Reverend Paul R. Shanley, a priest who transferred to the diocese from Boston in 1990. Despite Shanley having a record of sexual abuse of minors in Massachusetts, the archdiocese described him to the diocese as "a priest in good standing. Later in 1990, Shanley was accused of abusing a teenager at a hotel in Palm Springs, California. In July 2003, after speaking to the new archbishop of Boston, Sean O'Malley, Barnes decided to drop the lawsuit.

In 2007, the Government of Mexico presented Barnes with the Ohtli award for his service to Mexican citizens living in the United States.In 2014, Barnes, citing economic benefits and good citizenship, encouraged parishioners in the diocese without health insurance to sign up for coverage under the 2010 Affordable Care Act.

=== Retirement ===
On June 22, 2020, his 75th birthday, Barnes submitted his letter of resignation as bishop of San Bernardino to Pope Francis. The pope accepted it on December 28, 2020, at which point Coadjutor Bishop Alberto Rojas succeeded automatically to the office.

== See also ==
- Catholic Church hierarchy
- Catholic Church in the United States
- Historical list of the Catholic bishops of the United States
- List of Catholic bishops of the United States
- Lists of patriarchs, archbishops, and bishops

Catholic Church titles
Preceded by Phillip Francis Straling	Bishop of San Bernardino; 1996–2020	Succeeded by Alberto Rojas
