= Alberto Rojas =

Mexican prelate of the Catholic Church (born 1965)

His Excellency, The Most Reverend Alberto Rojas
- Bishop of San Bernardino
- Diocese: San Bernardino
- Appointed: December 2, 2019
- Installed: February 24, 2020
- Predecessor: Gerald Richard Barnes
- Previous posts: Auxiliary Bishop of Chicago and Titular Bishop of Marazanae (2011–2019); Coadjutor Bishop of San Bernardino (2019–2020)

Orders
- Ordination: May 25, 1997 by Francis George
- Consecration: August 10, 2011 by Francis George, Gustavo García-Siller, and Józef Guzdek

Personal details
- Born: January 5, 1965 (age 61) Aguascalientes, Mexico
- Education: Saint Mary of the Lake Seminary
- Motto: Nos basta el amor de Dios (God's love is all we need)

Styles of Alberto Rojas
- Reference style: His Excellency; The Most Reverend
- Spoken style: Your Excellency
- Religious style: Bishop

Alberto Rojas (born January 5, 1965) is a Mexican-born prelate of the Roman Catholic Church who has been serving as bishop of the Diocese of San Bernardino in Southern California since 2020. He previously served as an auxiliary bishop of the Archdiocese of Chicago in Illinois from 2011 to 2019.

== Biography ==
=== Early life ===
Alberto Rojas was born on January 5, 1965, in Aguascalientes, Mexico, and attended elementary, secondary schools and college there. He entered the Santa Maria de Guadalupe Seminary in Aguascalientes at age 15. After coming to the United States, he completed a year of discernment at Casa Jesus in 1993 and then attended Saint Mary of the Lake Seminary in Mundelein, Illinois, Rojas earned his Masters of Divinity from Mundelein in 1997.

=== Priesthood ===
Rojas was ordained on May 25, 1997, as a priest of the Archdiocese of Chicago by Cardinal Francis George at Holy Name Cathedral in Chicago.

After his 1997 ordination, the archdiocese assigned Rojas as associate pastor of St. Gregory the Great Parish in Chicago. He was transferred in 1999 to serve in the same role at St. Ita Parish in Chicago. Rojas left St. Ida in 2002 to join the faculty of Saint Mary of the Lake, where he taught for the next seven years. In 2010, Rojas was appointed as pastor of Good Shepherd Parish in Chicago.

=== Auxiliary Bishop of Chicago ===
Coat of arms for Rojas as auxiliary bishop of Chicago and coadjutor bishop of San Bernardino

On June 13, 2011, Rojas was appointed as an auxiliary bishop of Chicago and titular bishop of Marazanae by Pope Benedict XVI. He received his episcopal consecration at Holy Name Cathedral on August 10, 2011, from Cardinal George with Bishop Józef Guzdek and Archbishop Gustavo Garcia-Siller serving as co-consecrators.

While an auxiliary bishop, Rojas also served as episcopal vicar for Vicariate III. He also serve as the archbishop's liaison to Hispanic Catholics and as his delegate to Consejo Pastoral Arquidiocesano Hispano-Americano.

=== Coadjutor Bishop and Bishop of San Bernardino ===
On December 2, 2019, Rojas was appointed as coadjutor bishop of San Bernardino by Pope Francis to assist Bishop Gerald Barnes in his duties. Rojas became bishop of San Bernardino when Barnes retired on December 28, 2020.

==== Dispensation decree on attending mass ====
On July 8, 2025, Rojas issued a decree allowing a dispensation from mass due to raids conducted by the United States Immigration and Customs Enforcement (ICE) against illegal immigrants. Rojas cited the Code of Canon law 87 §1.

==== Pride Mass ====
In June 2026, Rojas celebrated a "Pride Mass" in San Bernardino County.

Catholic Church titles
Preceded by Gerald Richard Barnes	Bishop of San Bernardino; 2020–present	Succeeded by incumbent
