= Diocese of San Bernardino =

Latin Catholic ecclesiastical jurisdiction in California

Coordinates: 34.1294°N 117.2930°W

Diocese of San Bernardino Dioecesis Sancti Bernardi Diócesis de San Bernardino
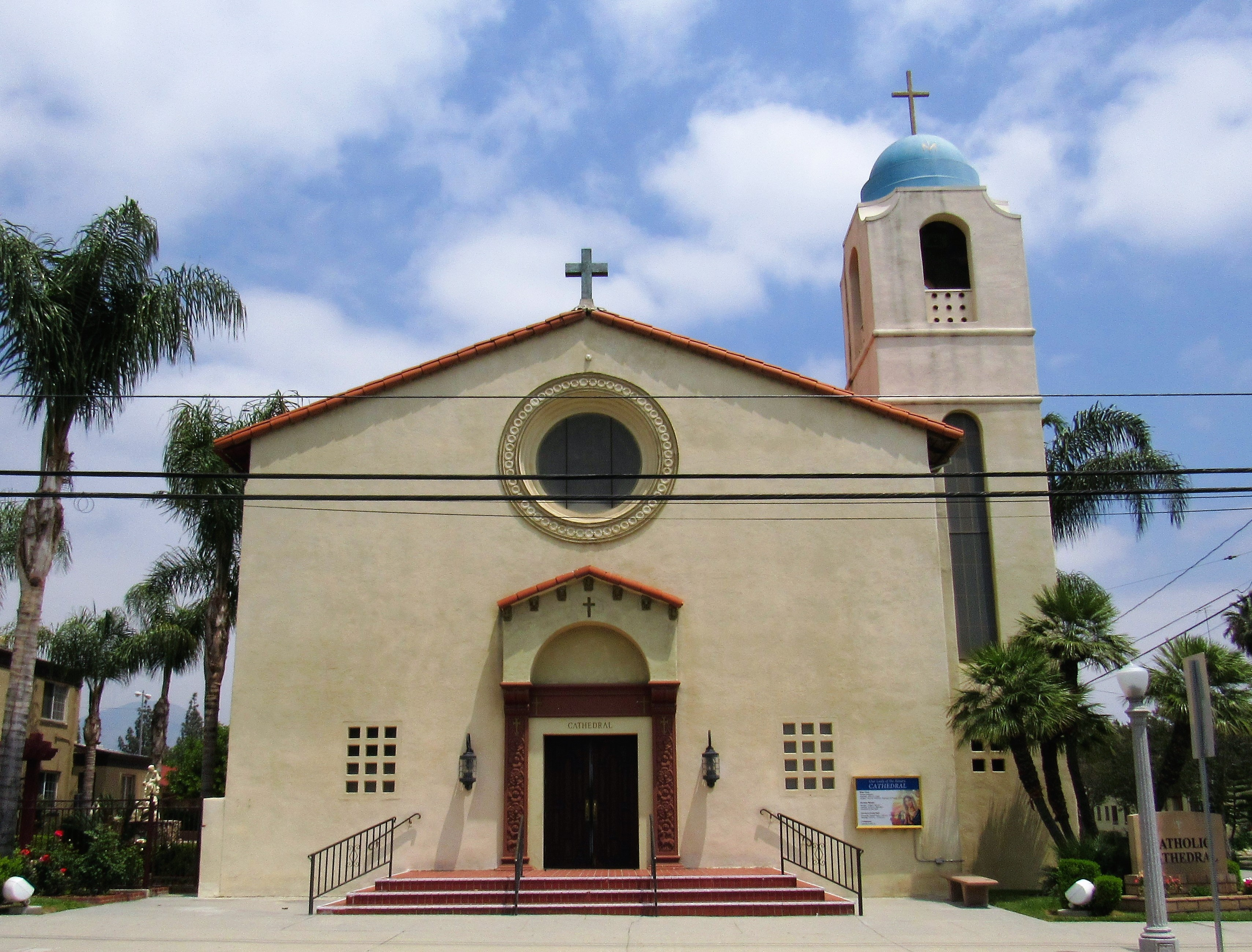
- Our Lady of the Rosary Cathedral

- Coat of arms

Location
- Country: United States
- Territory: Counties of San Bernardino and Riverside, California
- Ecclesiastical province: Los Angeles

Statistics
- Area: 70,689 km^{2} (27,293 sq mi)
- Population: Total; Catholics: (as of 2019); 4,650,631; 1,740,655 (37.4%)
- Parishes: 92
- Schools: 30

Information
- Denomination: Catholic
- Sui iuris church: Latin Church
- Rite: Roman Rite
- Established: November 6, 1978
- Cathedral: Our Lady of the Rosary Cathedral
- Patron saint: St. Bernardine of Siena; Our Lady of Guadalupe

Current leadership
- Pope: Leo XIV
- Bishop: Alberto Rojas
- Metropolitan Archbishop: José Gómez
- Bishops emeritus: Rutilio del Riego Jáñez; Gerald Richard Barnes

Map
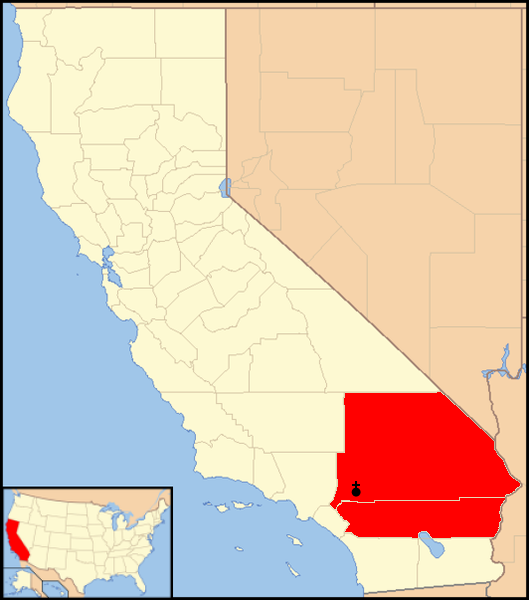

Website
- sbdiocese.org

The Diocese of San Bernardino (Latin: Dioecesis Sancti Bernardi, Spanish: Diócesis de San Bernardino) is a Catholic diocese in Southern California. Erected in 1978, its jurisdiction extends over San Bernardino and Riverside counties. It is a suffragan diocese of the Archdiocese of Los Angeles. The cathedral is Our Lady of the Rosary Cathedral in San Bernardino.

== Demographics ==
In 2019, the Diocese of San Bernardino reported a population of 1,740,655 Catholics, a 22,000 increase from the previous year. That made San Bernardino the fifth largest Catholic diocese in the United States. The main cause of this increase was thought to be the increasing migration of Hispanics to the area in part due to the economic opportunities and affordable housing in comparison to the rest of California.

== History ==
=== 1800 to 1840 ===
During the 18th century, all of California was a Spanish colony, part of the province of Las Californias in the Spanish Viceroyalty of New Spain. In 1804, the Spanish split Las Californias into two provinces:

- Alta California (Upper California) This included the modern American states of California, Nevada, Arizona, and Utah, along with western Colorado and southwestern Wyoming.
- Baja California Territory (Lower California). This consisted of the modern Mexican states of Baja California and Baja California Sur.

Spanish missionaries from the Mission San Gabriel Arcángel in present-day Los Angeles established the first church in the San Bernardino area in 1810 at the village of Wa'aachnga, later Politania The missionary Francisco Dumetz named the church "San Bernardino" after the feast day of St. Bernardino of Siena.

The first Spanish settlement in present-day Riverside County was an estancia, or farm, established by the Mission San Luis Rey de Francia at the Luiseño village of Temescal. In 1819, Franciscan missionaries established the San Bernardino de Sena Estancia in what is today Redlands.

After the Mexican War of Independence ended in 1821, Alta California became part of Mexico. The Mexican Government in 1835 secularized all the Catholic missions in Alta California, including the Mission San Luis Rey de Francia. This action precipitated massive exodus of clergy from these missions and the breakup of their large landholdings.

=== 1821 to 1859 ===
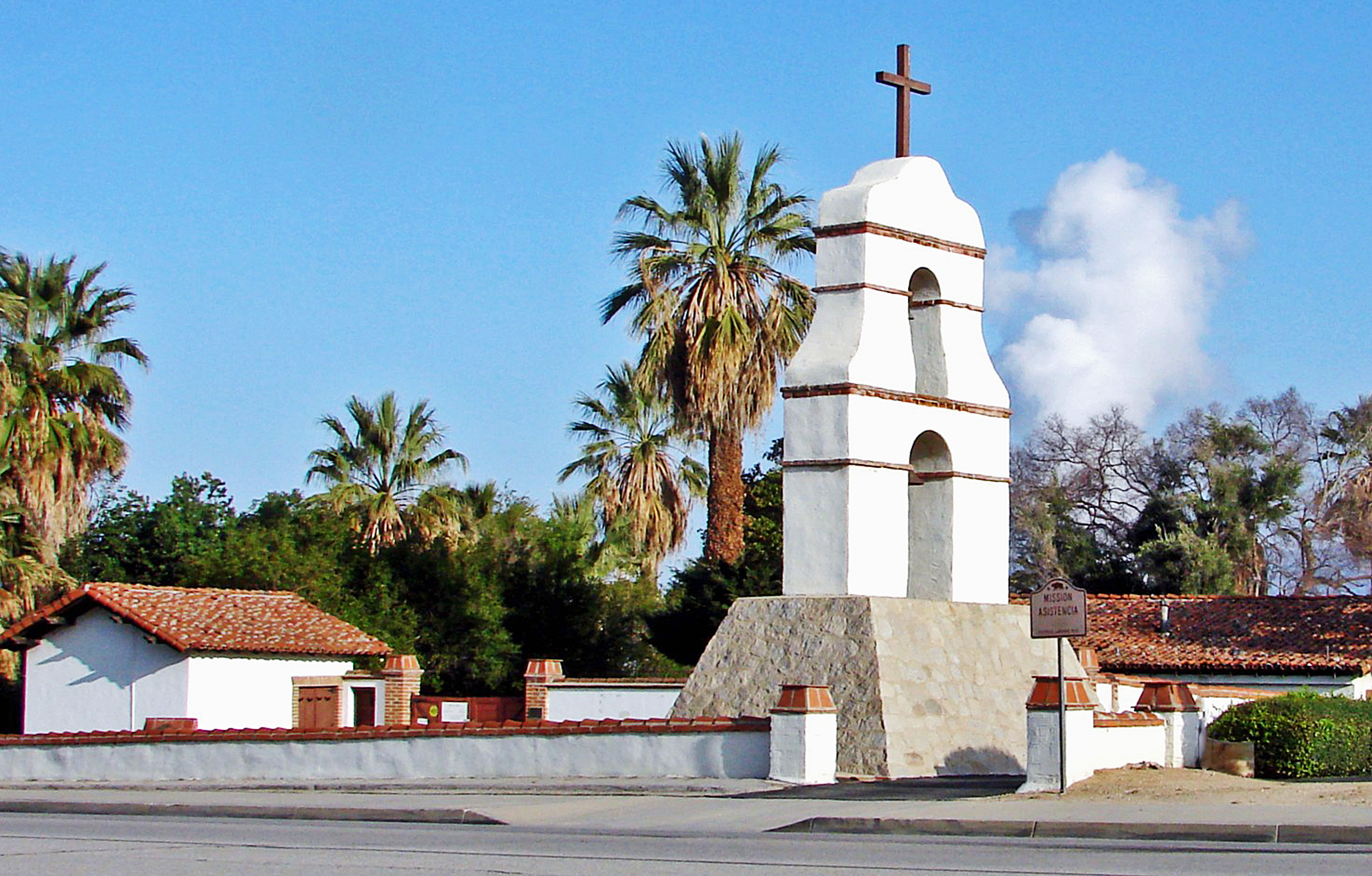
Mission Asistencia, Redlands

In 1840, Pope Gregory XVI set up the Diocese of California. The new diocese included both Alta California and Baja California. Gregory XVI set the episcopal see at present-day San Diego in Alta California. The first bishop of the new diocese was Francisco Garcia Diego y Moreno. Moreno designated the Mission Santa Barbara in Santa Barbara as his pro-cathedral.

In 1848, Mexico ceded Alta California to the United States at the close of the Mexican–American War. The government of Mexico then complained to the Vatican about San Diego, now an American city, having jurisdiction over the Mexican parishes in Baja California. In response, the Vatican in 1849 divided the Diocese of California:

- Baja California became a Mexican jurisdiction.
- Alta California became the Diocese of Monterey. The Vatican moved the see city from San Diego to Monterey because it was move centrally located. The Royal Presidio Chapel in Monterey became the cathedral of the new American diocese.

=== 1859 to 1978 ===
In 1859, Pius IX renamed the Diocese of Monterey as the Diocese of Monterey-Los Angeles to recognize the growth of Los Angeles; the see was transferred to Los Angeles in 1876. St. Francis de Sales, the first parish in Riverside County, was established in 1886.That same year, St. Edward the Confessor Parish was founded in Corona. In 1899, St. George was opened as a mission church in Ontario. The Claretian Missionary Fathers in 1905 established Our Lady of Mount Carmel, the first Catholic church in Rancho Cucamonga. The first parish in Barstow, St. Joseph's, was erected in 1921.

In 1922, the Vatican divided the diocese again, with the southern portion becoming the Diocese of Los Angeles-San Diego. The first parish in Victorville was St. Joan of Arc, erected in 1927. In 1926, Our Lady of Solitude Parish was erected in Palm Springs. St. Joseph opened in Fontana in 1930, the first Catholic parish in that city. The Sisters of Charity of the Incarnate Word in 1931 opened St. Bernardine Hospital in San Bernardino. It is today St. Bernardino Medical Center.

The Diocese of San Diego was erected in 1936, including San Bernardino and Riverside Counties. These two counties would remain part of the Diocese of San Diego for the next 42 years. The first parish in Palm Desert was Sacred Heart, erected in 1956. The singer Bing Crosby held a fundraiser for the construction of its church. St. Mary's Hospital opened in Apple Valley in 1956. It is today Providence St. Mary Medical Center. In 1957, St. Christopher Parish was erected in Moreno Valley, the first in that city.

=== 1978 to present ===
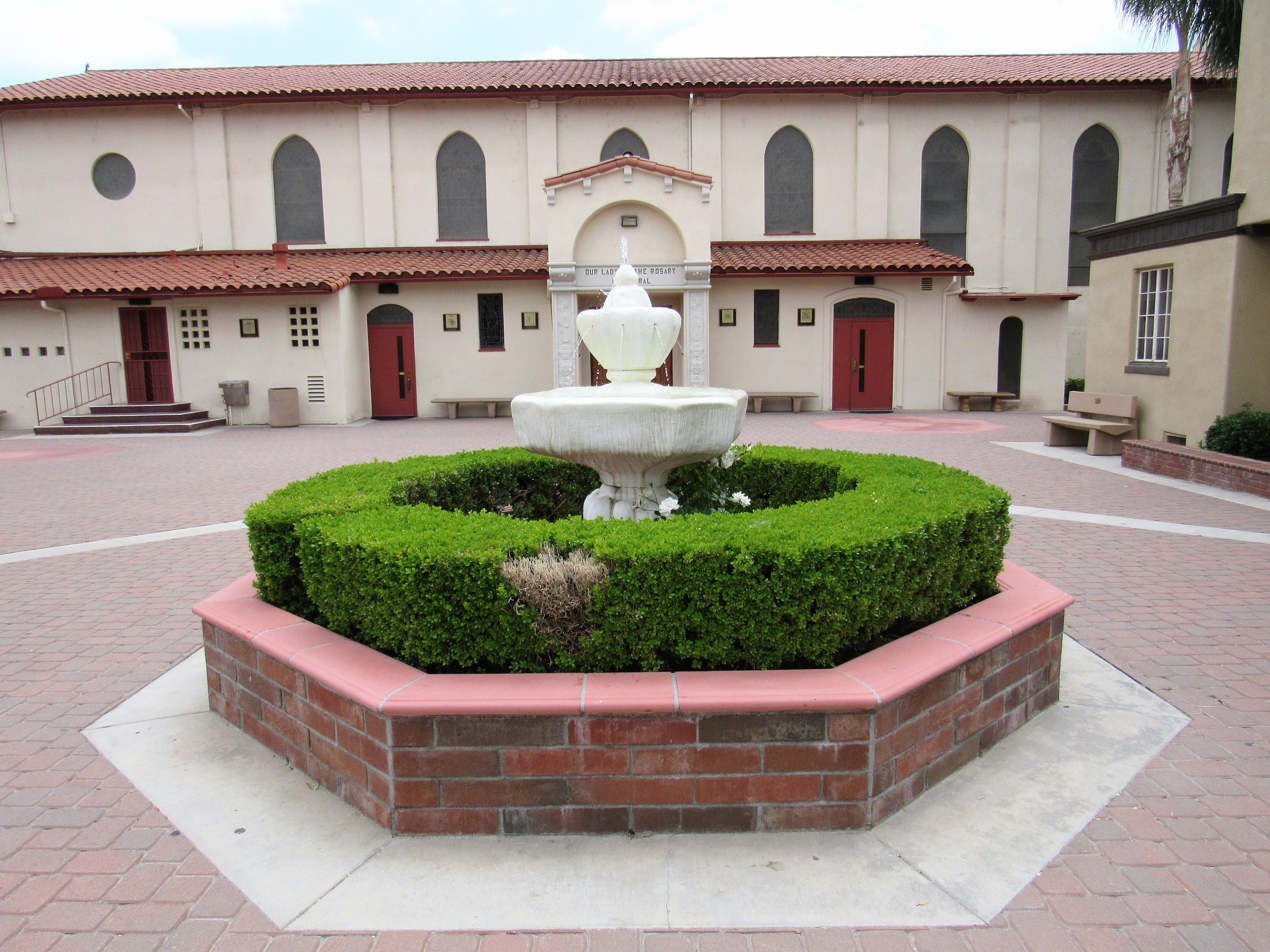
Courtyard, Our Lady of the Rosary Cathedral (2018)

Pope John Paul II erected the Diocese of San Bernardino on November 6, 1978, taking San Bernardino and Riverside Counties from the Diocese of San Diego. He appointed Reverend Phillip Straling of San Diego as the first bishop of San Bernardino.

During Straling's episcopate, the diocese grew from about 235,000 people to 800,000, and from 85 parishes to 105. For the formation for ministry, he established a diaconate program, and started the Straling Institute in 1980 for laymen. In 1995, John Paul II named Straling as bishop of the Diocese of Reno and replaced him in San Bernardino with Auxiliary Bishop Gerald Barnes.

Under Barnes, the diocese operated three high schools, twenty-three elementary schools and three pre-schools. In 2001, Barnes inaugurated the Annual Bishop's Golf Classic, held at golf courses in the diocese. Its purpose was to fund scholarships for children to attend Catholic schools. During his tenure, Barnes closed four primary schools in Barstow, Banning, Apple Valley and San Bernardino. The high desert portion of the diocese currently has no Catholic schools. In 2014, the diocese removed visiting priest Joseph Jablonski from the ministry after receiving a complaint that he had been grooming a young man for a possible sexual encounter. His order sent Jablonski to treatment, then assigned him again to ministry, where he worked in three Illinois dioceses until 2018, when he appeared on the Diocese of San Bernardino's list of 34 credibly accused priests since its founding. In August 2015, priest Marcelo De Jesumaria was sentenced to six months in prison and six months of home detention after being convicted of groping a female passenger during a flight.

The diocese announced in May 2019 its participation with other Southern California dioceses in a voluntary compensation plan for victims of clergy sexual abuse. In December 2019, Auxiliary Bishop Alberto Rojas of the Archdiocese of Chicago was appointed as coadjutor bishop of San Bernardino by Pope Francis to assist Barnes. When Barnes retired in 2020, Rojas automatically succeeded him as bishop. Nick Flores in December 2019 sued the diocese, claiming that former priest Louis Perreault had assaulted him in the 1990s. The diocese had permanently removed Perreault from ministry in September 2011 after receiving abuse allegations against him. In May 2023, seven priests were ordained for San Bernardino, the largest number of ordinations in the diocese's history.

In July 2025, Rojas issued a dispensation from attending Sunday mass for parishioners who feared being targeted at churches by agents of Immigration and Customs Enforcement (ICE). As of 2026, the current bishop of San Bernardino is Alberto Rojas.

== Bishops ==
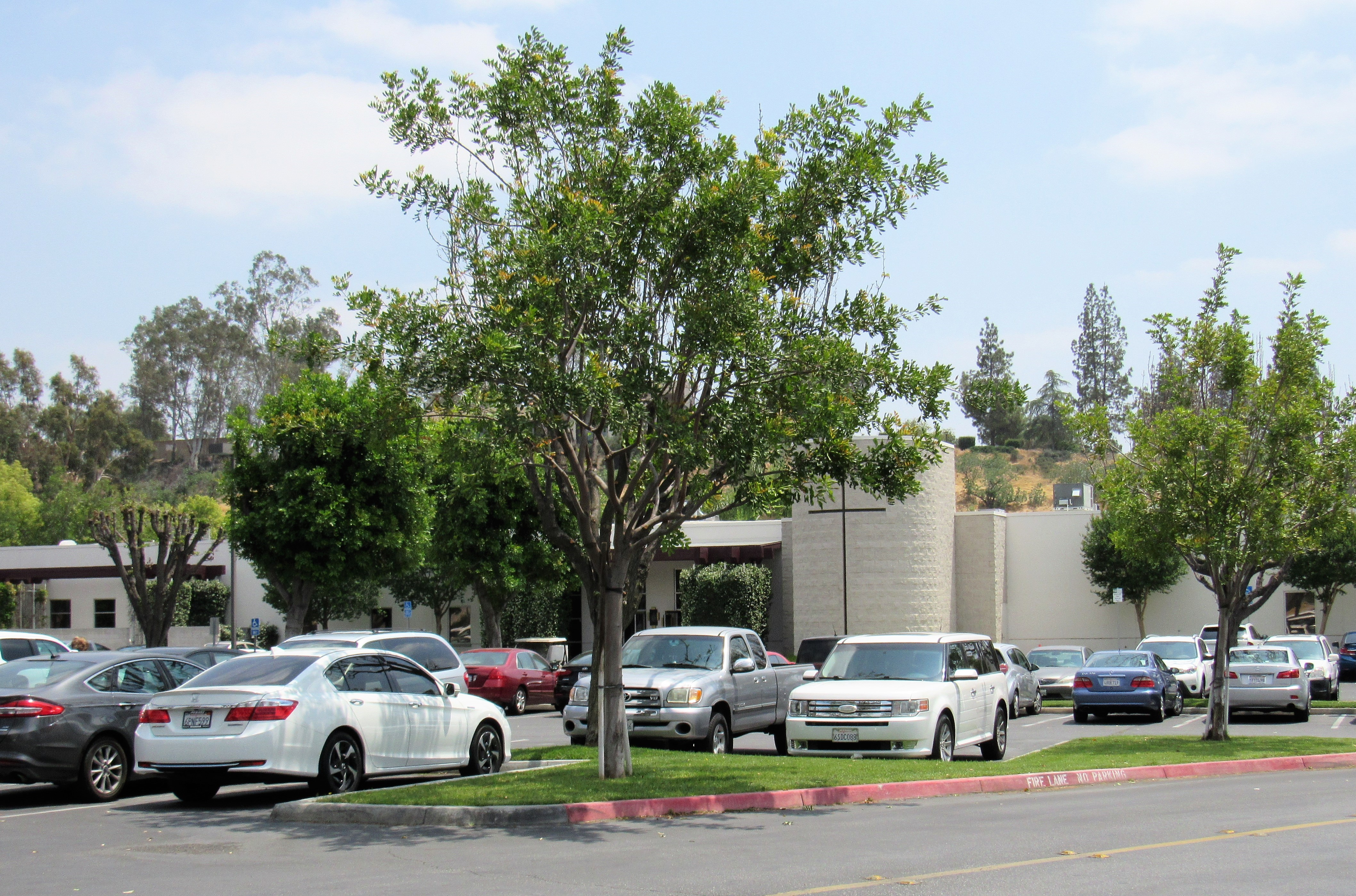
Diocesan Pastoral Center

=== Bishops of San Bernardino ===
1. Phillip Francis Straling (1978–1995), appointed Bishop of Reno
2. Gerald Richard Barnes (1995–2020)
3. Alberto Rojas (2020–present)

=== Coadjutor bishops ===
Alberto Rojas (2019–2020)

=== Auxiliary bishops ===
- Gerald Richard Barnes (1992–1995)
- Dennis Patrick O'Neil (2001–2003)
- Rutilio del Riego Jáñez (2005–2015)

== Education ==
As of 2026, the diocese has four high schools, 22 elementary schools and two pre-schools.

=== High schools ===
- Aquinas High School – San Bernardino
- Notre Dame High School – Riverside
- St. Jeanne de Lestonnac School –Temecula
- Xavier College Preparatory High School – Palm Desert
