= Holy Family Catholic Church (Chicago) =

Roman Catholic church in Chicago, Illinois

Coordinates: 41.8675°N 87.6547°W

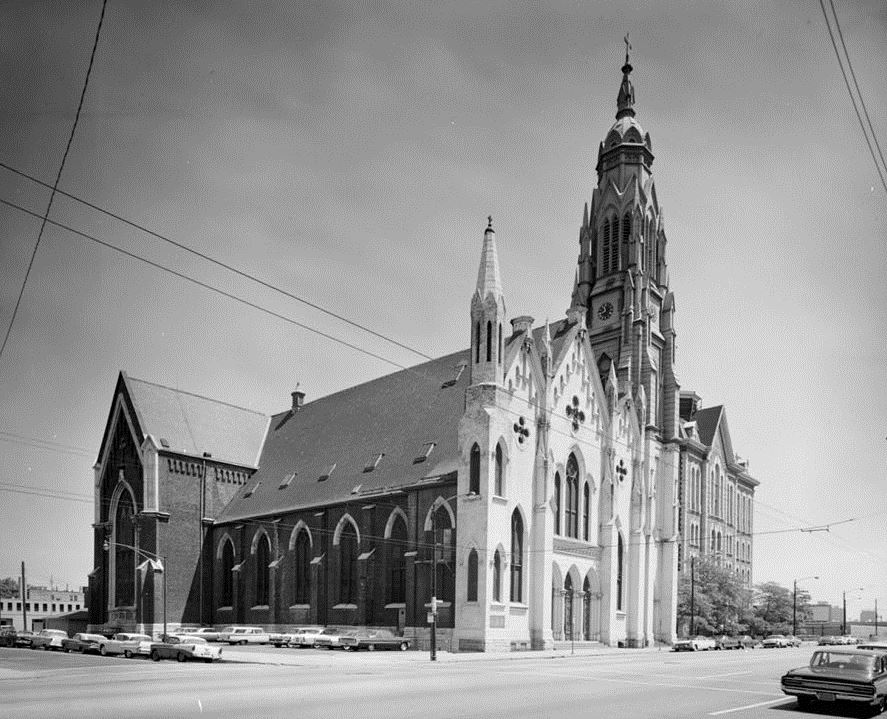
- 1964 photo from the Historic American Buildings Survey

Religion
- Affiliation: Roman Catholic

Location
- Location: 1080 West Roosevelt Road, Chicago, Illinois
- Interactive map of Holy Family Catholic Church

Architecture
- Style: Gothic Revival
- Groundbreaking: 1857
- Completed: 1860

Holy Family Catholic Church is a Catholic church in Chicago, Illinois. It is the second-oldest such church in the city and one of the few structures that survived the Great Chicago Fire.

The Society of Jesus leased the Church to the Archdiocese of Chicago, who operated the parish. In July 2019, following the archdiocese's Renew my Church campaign, a canonical parish consolidation with the former Notre Dame de Chicago parish occurred, and the church building was returned to the Society of Jesus.

The Church of the Holy Family continues to serve the students, alumni and friends of St. Ignatius College Prep, as well as families who wish to celebrate weddings, baptisms and funerals.

== History ==
=== Foundation and early history ===
Church of the Holy Family was founded in 1857 by Fr. Arnold Damen, SJ, at the behest of Bishop Anthony O'Regan. Damen wanted to build a large complex with multiple buildings to serve the needs of the local Catholic immigrants, but many were concerned about raising the funds for a grand church in the wake of the Panic of 1857. Damen, though, was a convincing fund-raiser, and by the end of May of that year had found $30,000 of the $100,000 necessary to bring his vision to life. Many of the contributions were just five or ten cents from poor immigrant families who couldn't afford more, but wanted to support the church. A plain wooden structure was built to serve as the church until a grand, permanent building was erected.

Built in the Victorian Gothic style, the permanent brick-and-stone church was dedicated on August 26, 1860, in a ceremony celebrated by thirteen bishops. John Bernard Fitzpatrick, Bishop of Boston, celebrated the mass, and Peter Kenrick, Archbishop of St. Louis, preached the sermon. The building was designed by John Van Osdel, Chicago's first registered architect. Over the next twenty years, fifteen more buildings were added to the grounds, creating the religious center Damen had dreamed of. One of these buildings was Saint Ignatius College, which later became Saint Ignatius College Prep and Loyola University Chicago.

=== Ties to the Great Chicago Fire ===
Church of the Holy Family is one of the few buildings in the city to have survived the Chicago Fire in 1871. When the fire broke out, Damen was in Brooklyn preaching as a missionary. After being made aware of the fire, he invoked Our Lady of Perpetual Help to protect the church and its nearby structures and promised to light seven candles in front of her statue in the church should she intercede for its protection. The church complex was indeed spared, and seven candles (now electric) perpetually burn in front of her statue in the east transept.

Additionally, Patrick and Catherine O'Leary, owners of the cow rumored to have started the fire, were parishioners at Holy Family.

=== Later history ===
By the 1890s, Holy Family was the largest English-speaking congregation in the United States with over 25,000 parishioners. Membership was initially largely Irish, shifting to an Italian, then Hispanic, then African-American population.

In the last part of the twentieth century, Holy Family fell into disrepair. Once a thriving parish, by 1987 the church had only 150 to 250 parishioners and was going to be torn down so a smaller church more suited to the number of parishioners would be built. The main sanctuary had been closed in 1984 because of damage to the roof, and the few remaining parishioners held mass in a smaller chapel.

However, the parishioners and their pastor, Fr. George Lane, SJ, rejected the idea that Holy Family should be destroyed. With the approval of Lane's Jesuit superior, Father Provincial Robert Wild, the community created the Holy Family Preservation Society and launched an effort to save the 100-year-old building. Informed they would need $1,000,000 in cash in the bank by December 30, 1990, they channeled the legendary fund-raising energy of Arnold Damen. Donations came in from across the country, and even included a $50,000 check from talk show host Oprah Winfrey. A 24-hour prayer vigil for the intercession of Our Lady of Perpetual Help from December 26 to December 30, 1990, propelled them over the finish line. In the final nights of the year, the vigil drew crowds of Chicagoans with ties to the church (as many as one-third of Catholic Irish-American Chicagoans may have familial history at Holy Family). Just as had happened with Damen's efforts, small donations added up and they closed out the year with $1,011,000. Restoration began in 1991 and cost over $3,000,000.

In the morning of July 25, 2003, the church was once again almost destroyed, this time by a fast-moving fire. Firefighters used infrared technology to track the conflagration moving through the basement, enabling them to extinguish it just before the blaze would have entered the sanctuary space. Officials said the church would have been destroyed in minutes without the use of thermal imaging. The church was spared and continued as a community parish, establishing strong ties with the alumni of Saint Ignatius College Prep next door.

In January 2019, it was announced that the parish would be merged with Notre Dame de Chicago as part of the Chicago Archdiocese's reconfiguration plan. A pastor for both parishes will say Masses in both locations but be based out of Notre Dame, and Holy Family will still be available for special events and weddings.

== Architecture ==
The original church was 146 feet long and 85 feet wide. The width increased to 125 feet in 1862 when two transepts were added, and the nave was extended in 1866 to bring the length to its current 180 feet.

The church is home to the oldest stained-glass windows in Chicago. They are situated in the clerestory and were made in 1860 by W.H. Carse Co. Additional stained glass windows were installed in 1907 by the Von Gerichten Art Glass Company of Columbus, Ohio, to celebrate the parish's golden jubilee. They show the Adoration of the Magi, the Annunciation, and Jesuit saints.

Parishioners purchased a pipe organ in 1870; built by Louis Mitchell & Son Co. in Montreal, it had 64 stops, 23,944 pipes, and was acoustically perfect. The organ is surrounded by an "orchestra" of angels, carved by 19th century sculptor Charles Oliver Dauphin, a French-Canadian artist. Holy Family is home to the largest collection of the artist's work in the world.

The church's tower was built in 1874. At a height of 236 feet, it was the tallest structure in the city of Chicago until the Monadnock Building was completed in 1890. The tower's bronze bells were cast in 1860 in St. Louis, and were automated and the tower illuminated in the 1990 restoration.
