= John J. McNichols =

American lawyer and politician (1927–2020)

Member of the Illinois House of Representatives

Personal details
- Party: Democratic

John J. McNichols (January 8, 1927 – December 9, 2020) was an American lawyer and politician.

McNichols was born in Chicago, Illinois. He grew up in Berwyn, Illinois and went to St. Odilo's Elementary School. He went to St. Ignatius College Prep in Chicago. McNichols served in the United States Navy during World War II. He received his bachelor's degree from Loyola University Chicago in 1949 and his law degree from Loyola University Chicago School of Law in 1953. He practiced law in Chicago. McNichols served in the Illinois House of Representatives in 1965 and 1966 and was a Democrat. McNichols died in Arlington Heights, Illinois.
