= Mary Morrissey =

Mary Morrissey may refer to:

- Mary Manin Morrissey, founder of the Living Enrichment Center
- Mary A. Morrissey (born 1957), member of the Vermont House of Representatives
- Mary Morrissy (born 1957), Irish novelist and short story writer
- Mary Kwasny, also published as Mary Morrissey, American biostatistician
