= Holy Cross High School (River Grove, Illinois) =

Location
- River Grove, Illinois 60171; United States; 41.936°N 87.827°W

Information
- Type: Private school
- Religious affiliation: Roman Catholic
- Established: 1961
- Closed: 2004
- Oversight: Roman Catholic Archdiocese of Chicago
- Grades: 9–12
- Gender: Boys
- Campus type: Suburban
- Colours: Red and grey
- Athletics conference: East Suburban Catholic Conference
- Nickname: Crusaders
- Yearbook: Templar
- Affiliation: Congregation of Holy Cross

Holy Cross High School was an all-boys Catholic high school in River Grove, Illinois, that operated from August 1961 until June 2004.

== History ==
At one point, Holy Cross's enrollment was as high as 1,556 students. The school expanded its facilities in 1969 with the construction of a humanities learning center.

=== Chicago Cubs ===
The school had a close connection to the Chicago Cubs baseball team in the late 1960s and early 1970s. Third-baseman Ron Santo ran a baseball academy on the Holy Cross grounds, and the Cubs helped fund equipment for the school's baseball team. The Cubs even held their workouts at the school in spring 1972, in the midst of a strike which had shut down all of the major league training camps.

=== 1974 graduation controversy ===
In 1974, principal Raymond Dufresne cancelled Holy Cross's graduation ceremony and baccalaureate mass after a group of seniors threw firecrackers and honked their car horns in the school parking lot during a graduation rehearsal. Their actions prompted a police visit to the school, though no one was arrested. Afterwards, Dufresne wrote a letter to parents, stating, "Unfortunately, the behavior of too many of the class of 1974 . . . was not something we can look to with pride or joy. . . . Our decision is that there will be no graduation ceremony." After meeting with faculty and parents, Dufresne decided to reinstate the ceremonies, but required that students sit with their parents, instead of in a group.

=== Closure ===
In December, 2003, the school announced that they no longer had enough funding or interest in enrollment to continue. Only 79 students took the entrance exam for the 2004–2005 school year, and at least 125 were necessary to keep the school open.

In June 2004, the neighboring all-girls high school Mother Theodore Guerin High School accepted all Holy Cross students, becoming coed and changing their name to Guerin College Preparatory High School. Students from Mother Guerin and Holy Cross had already been sharing each other's facilities for certain classes, such as drama, music, and foreign languages. Guerin closed in 2020.

== Athletics ==
Holy Cross's sports teams were known as the Crusaders. Their baseball team earned six regional championships, two sectional championships, and two appearances in the IHSA State Finals, while their football team had two undefeated regular seasons and six state playoff berths.

== Notable alumni ==
- Yashar Ali, American freelance journalist
- Val Belmonte, former college hockey coach and college athletic director, winner of the 1987 CCHA Coach of the Year Award
- John Carpino (1977), current president of the Los Angeles Angels of Anaheim
- Tony Fiore (1990), pitcher drafted by the Philadelphia Phillies in the 1992 MLB Draft (28th round)
- Joseph Grendys, billionaire meat processor, Owner Koch Foods
- Joe Principe, bass guitarist of Rise Against
- Mike Rizzo (1979), current President/General Manager of the Washington Nationals
- Peter Sotos, American writer, musician, and child pornography publisher, best known as a member of the band Whitehouse
- Bobby Stevens (2005), shortstop drafted by the Baltimore Orioles in the 2008 MLB Draft (16th round)
- Garrett Wolfe (2002), All-American running back at NIU, 2006 NCAA leading rusher, drafted by the Chicago Bears in the 2007 NFL draft (3rd round)
