= Loyola University Chicago =

Jesuit research university in Illinois, US

- Former names: St. Ignatius College (1870–1909)
- Motto: Ad majorem Dei gloriam (Latin)
- Motto in English: For the greater glory of God
- Type: Private research university
- Established: 1870; 156 years ago
- Founder: Arnold Damen
- Religious affiliation: Catholic (Jesuit)
- Academic affiliations: ACCU, AJCU
- Endowment: $1.37 billion (2026)
- President: Mark Reed
- Provost: Douglas W. Woods
- Total staff: 1,792 (2025)
- Students: 16,579 (2025)
- Undergraduates: 11,357 (2025)
- Postgraduates: 4,892 (2025)
- Location: Chicago, Illinois, United States; 41.9999°N 87.6578°W
- Campus: 45 acres (18 ha)
- Colors: Maroon and gold
- Nickname: Ramblers
- Sporting affiliations: NCAA Division I – A-10
- Mascot: LU Wolf
- Website: luc.edu

Loyola University Chicago (Loyola /lɔɪˈoʊlə/ or LUC) is a private Jesuit research university in Chicago, Illinois, United States. Founded in 1870 by the Society of Jesus, Loyola is the fourth largest Catholic university in terms of enrollment in the United States. Its namesake is Saint Ignatius of Loyola. Loyola's professional schools include programs in medicine, nursing, and health sciences anchored by the Loyola University Medical Center, and the Loyola University Chicago School of Law. It is classified among "R1: Doctoral Universities – Very high research spending and doctorate production".

Comprising thirteen colleges and schools, Loyola offers more than 80 undergraduate and 140 graduate/professional programs and enrolls approximately 17,000 students. Loyola has five campuses across the Chicago metropolitan area, as well as a campus in Rome. Another guest program in Beijing was closed in 2018. The flagship Lake Shore Campus is on the shores of Lake Michigan in the Rogers Park and Edgewater neighborhoods of Chicago, just over seven miles (11.3 km) north of the Loop.

Loyola's athletic teams, nicknamed the Ramblers, compete in NCAA Division I as members of the Atlantic 10 Conference. Loyola won the 1963 NCAA men's basketball championship and remains the only school from Illinois to do so. The Ramblers are also two-time (2014, 2015) NCAA champions in men's volleyball.

== History ==
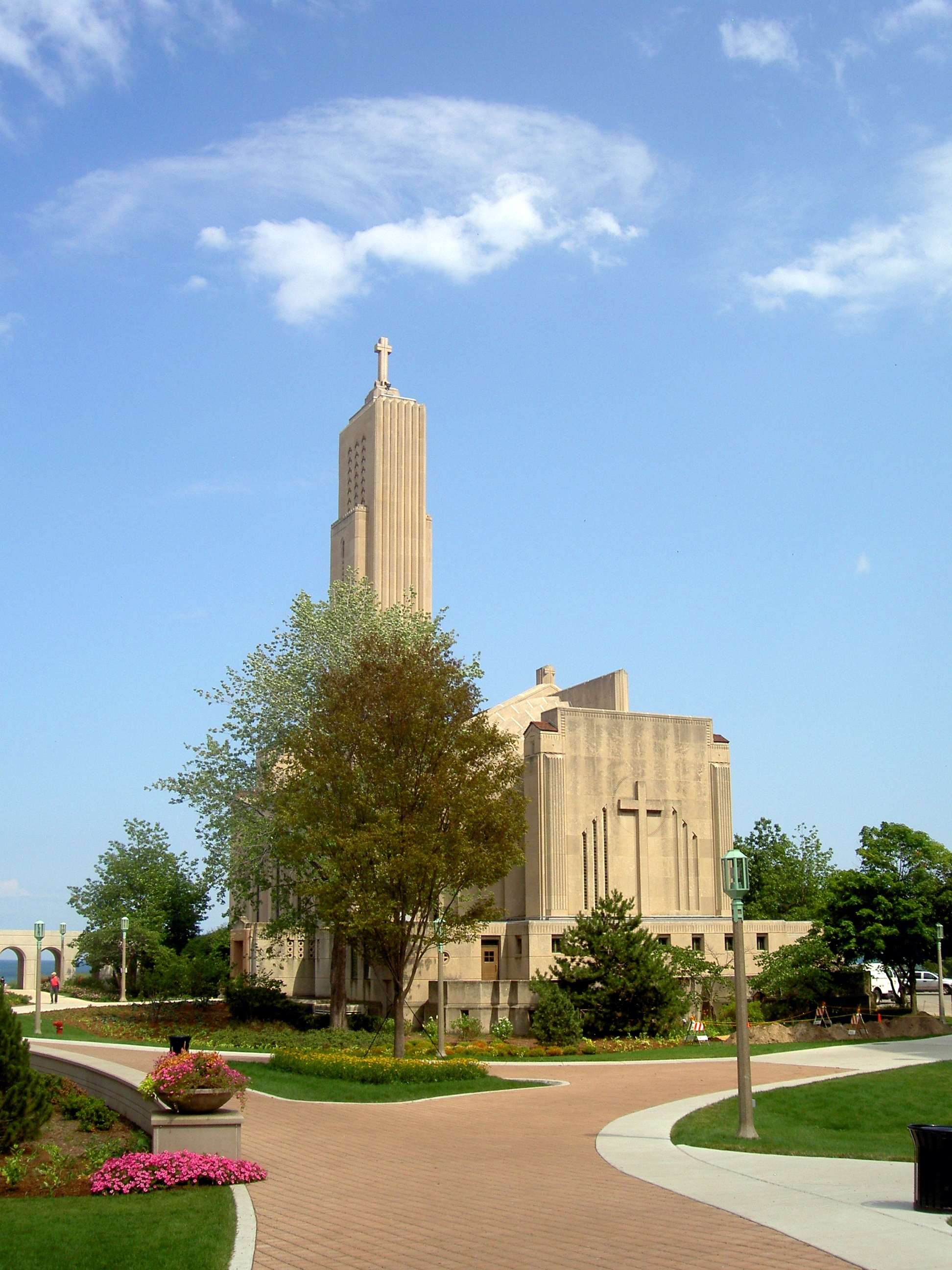
Madonna Della Strada Chapel

On June 30, 1870, Jesuit priest and educator Arnold Damen established St. Ignatius College. At that time, Chicago was a much smaller, but rapidly growing city just shy of 300,000 people, and as a result, the original campus was much closer to the city center, along Roosevelt Road. In 1909, the school was renamed Loyola University, and in 1912, it began to move to the Lake Shore Campus; the original building is part of St. Ignatius College Prep, adjacent to the University of Illinois at Chicago.

To meet the growing needs of Chicago, Loyola established professional schools in law (1908), medicine (1909), business (1922), and nursing (1935). The Chicago College of Dental Surgery became part of the university in 1923, and closed 70 years later. A downtown campus was founded in 1914, and with it, the School of Sociology. As the predecessor to the School of Social Work, it enrolled Loyola's first female students, though the school did not become fully coeducational until 1966. Loyola Academy, a college prep high school, occupied Dumbach Hall on the Lake Shore Campus, until it moved to Wilmette in 1957.

The Water Tower Campus opened in 1949. In 1962, Loyola opened a campus in Rome, near the site of the 1960 Summer Olympics. In 1969, Loyola established the School of Education and consolidated medical programs at the Loyola University Medical Center, a hospital and health care complex in Maywood, a neighboring suburb of Chicago. The university legally separated from the Jesuits in 1970, and came under lay control governed by a board of trustees. Loyola purchased neighboring Mundelein College in 1991.

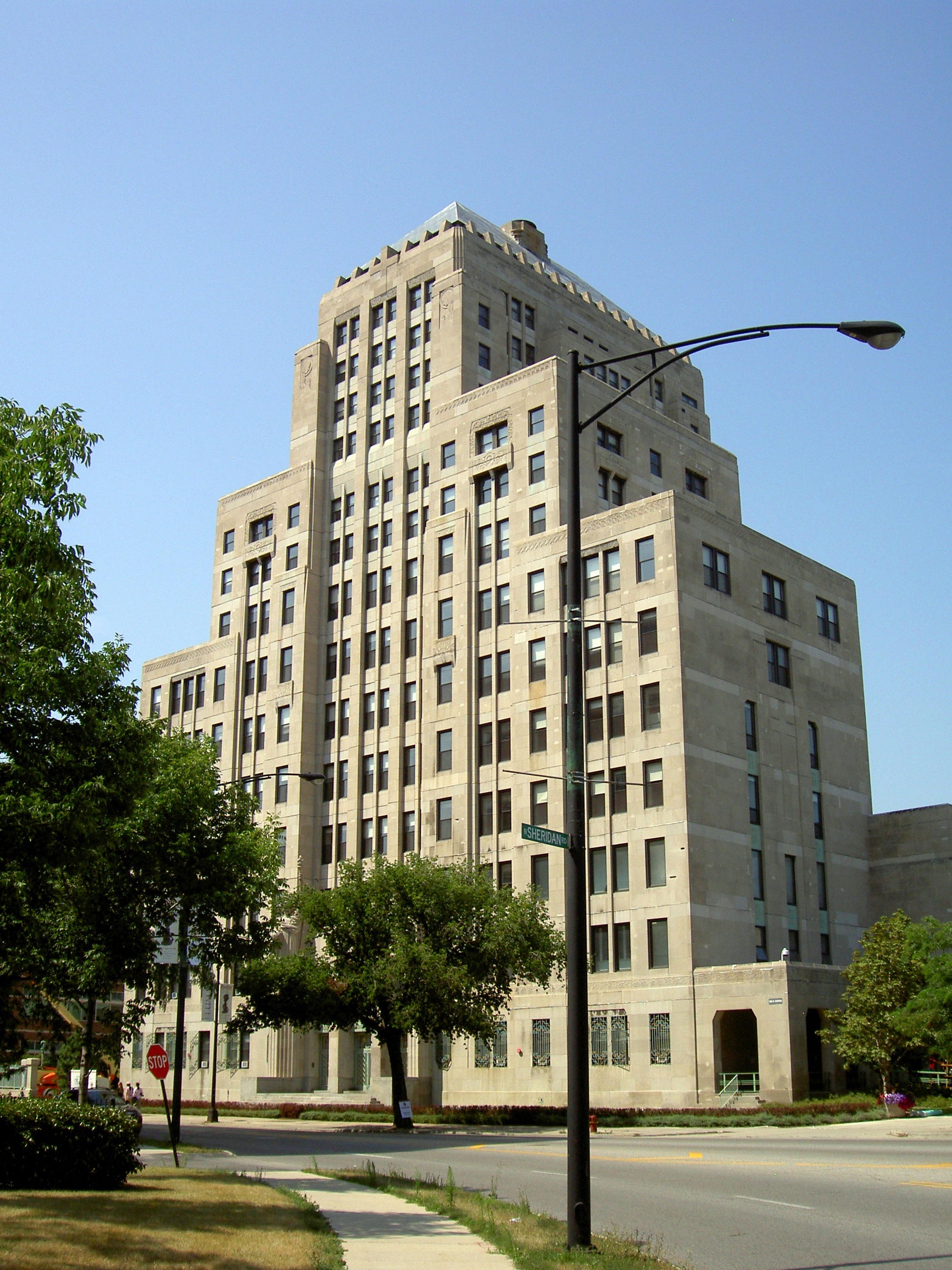
Mundelein Center

The university faced severe financial hardships and dwindling enrollment during the late 1990s. Michael J. Garanzini S.J. was instated as president of Loyola in 2001 and led major capital campaigns to improve Loyola's academic profile and campuses. In 2005, the Loyola University Museum of Art was established on the Water Tower Campus, and the Rome campus was renamed in honor of Director Emeritus John P. Felice. In 2009, the Cuneo Foundation presented the university with the Cuneo Mansion and Gardens, a 100-acre (40 ha) estate with an Italianate mansion and extensive collections of art and furnishings in Vernon Hills. The $50 million gift was one of the largest in Loyola history.

In 2010, Loyola purchased the Resurrection Retreat Center in Woodstock for retreats and ecological study, allowing the site to become the school's fifth campus. In 2012, Loyola alumnus Michael R. Quinlan donated $40 million to the business school, which was renamed in his honor. During this time, over 200,000 square feet of LEED-certified sustainable spaces have been built on the Lake Shore Campus, along with significant mixed-use developments on the Water Tower Campus.

In 2015, the university established Arrupe College, a uniquely structured two-year college designed to give low-income students access to a Loyola education.

On May 23, 2016, Loyola named Jo Ann Rooney its 24th president. She was the school's first female president and served until the end of September 2022, when Mark Reed succeeded her.

== Campuses ==
=== Lake Shore Campus ===
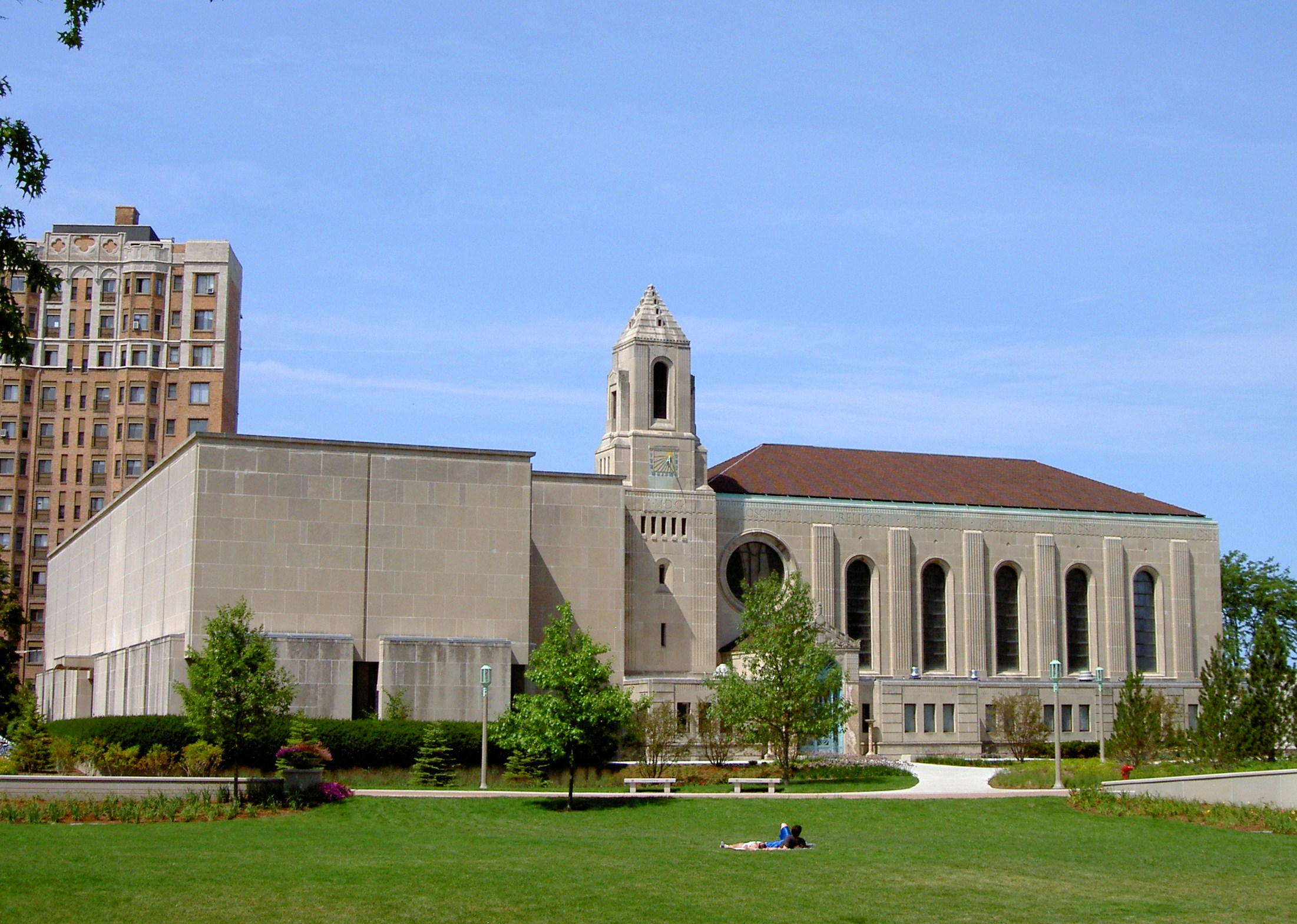
Cudahy Library

Loyola's flagship Lake Shore Campus is on the shores of Lake Michigan in the Rogers Park and Edgewater neighborhoods on Chicago's north side, about seven and a half miles north of the Loop. Founded in 1912, it is the school's primary residential campus and the home of the College of Arts and Sciences and a variety of graduate programs. With over 40 buildings, the campus offers green space and lakeshore access, as well as several landmarks: The Madonna Della Strada Chapel, an Art Deco masterpiece completed in 1939, is the center of Loyola's religious life. The Mundelein Center, a 200-foot tall Art Deco skyscraper completed in 1930, is the home of Loyola's fine and performing arts programs and is a National Historic Landmark. The Joseph J. Gentile Arena, which holds 5,500 for basketball, volleyball, and campus events, was recently expanded to include the Norville Center, a student-athlete academic center and home of Rambler athletics. The Damen Student Center, the main community space located in the center of campus, is home to many facilities, such as the Halas Recreation Center, the Damen Cinema, and one of the campus' three dining halls.

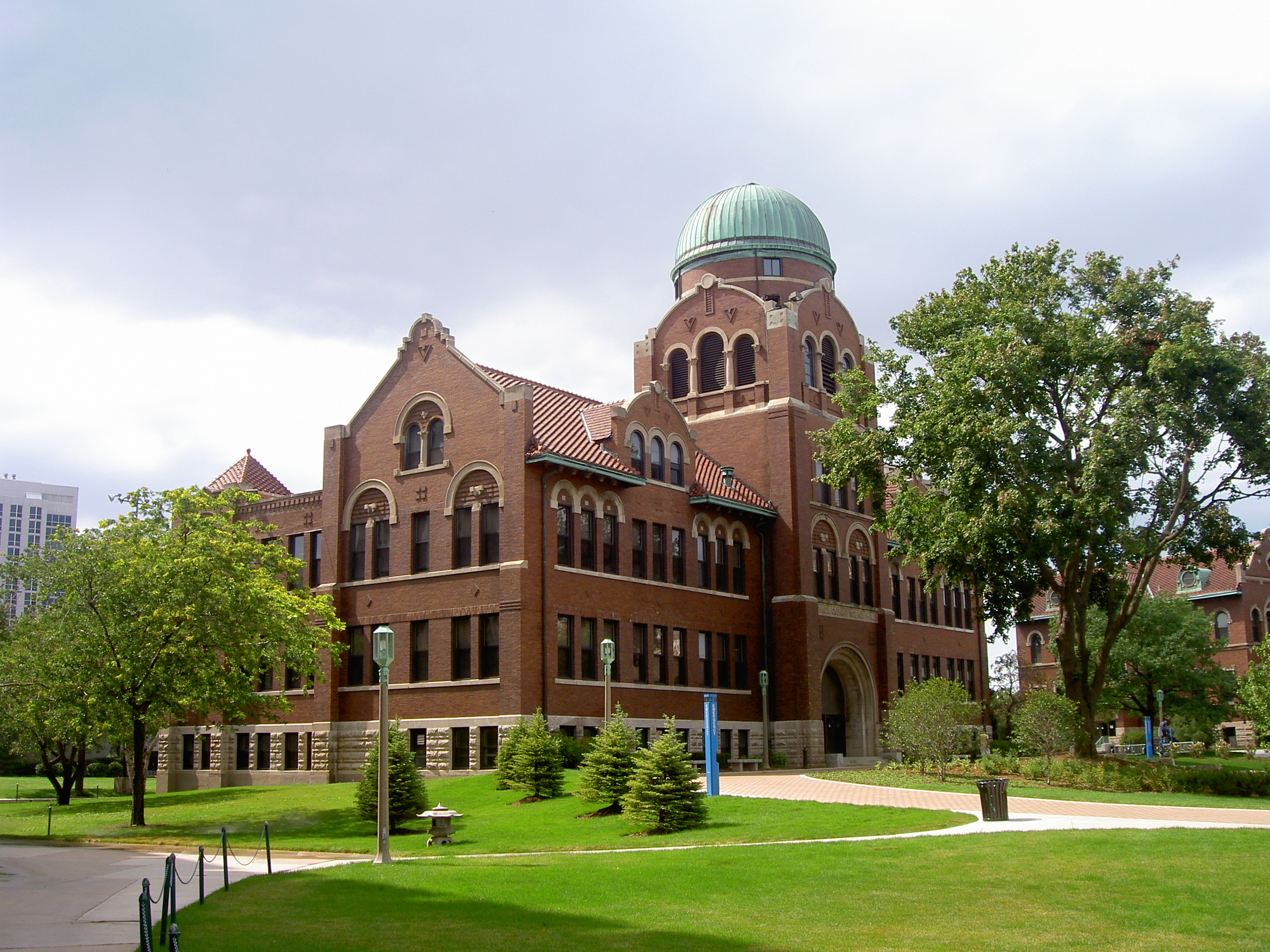
Cudahy Science Hall

The E. M. Cudahy Memorial Library contains over 900,000 volumes and 3,600 periodical subscriptions, and in 2008, was expanded to include the Information Commons, an academic and social space with glass curtain walls that offer unparalleled views of the lake and campus. Science education and research takes place in the Quinlan Life Sciences building and the Institute of Environmental Sustainability, a multipurpose complex that includes academic space, a residence hall, a greenhouse, and the largest geothermal energy facility in Chicago.

==== Sustainability ====
Loyola's various environmental efforts have reduced university energy use by 33% since 1998. Loyola has three LEED Silver certified buildings and four LEED Gold certified buildings, with all future construction to be LEED certified as well. Loyola has more green roofs than any college in the Midwest, which includes both new and renovated buildings.

=== Water Tower Campus ===
The Water Tower Campus opened in 1949, along a stretch of Michigan Avenue today known as the Magnificent Mile, and is named after the Chicago Water Tower, a city landmark that survived the Great Chicago Fire of 1871. It is the home of the Quinlan School of Business, the School of Law, the School of Education, the School of Continuing and Professional Studies, the School of Social Work, the School of Communication, the Institute of Pastoral Studies, and Arrupe College, as well as a selection of classes from programs based elsewhere.

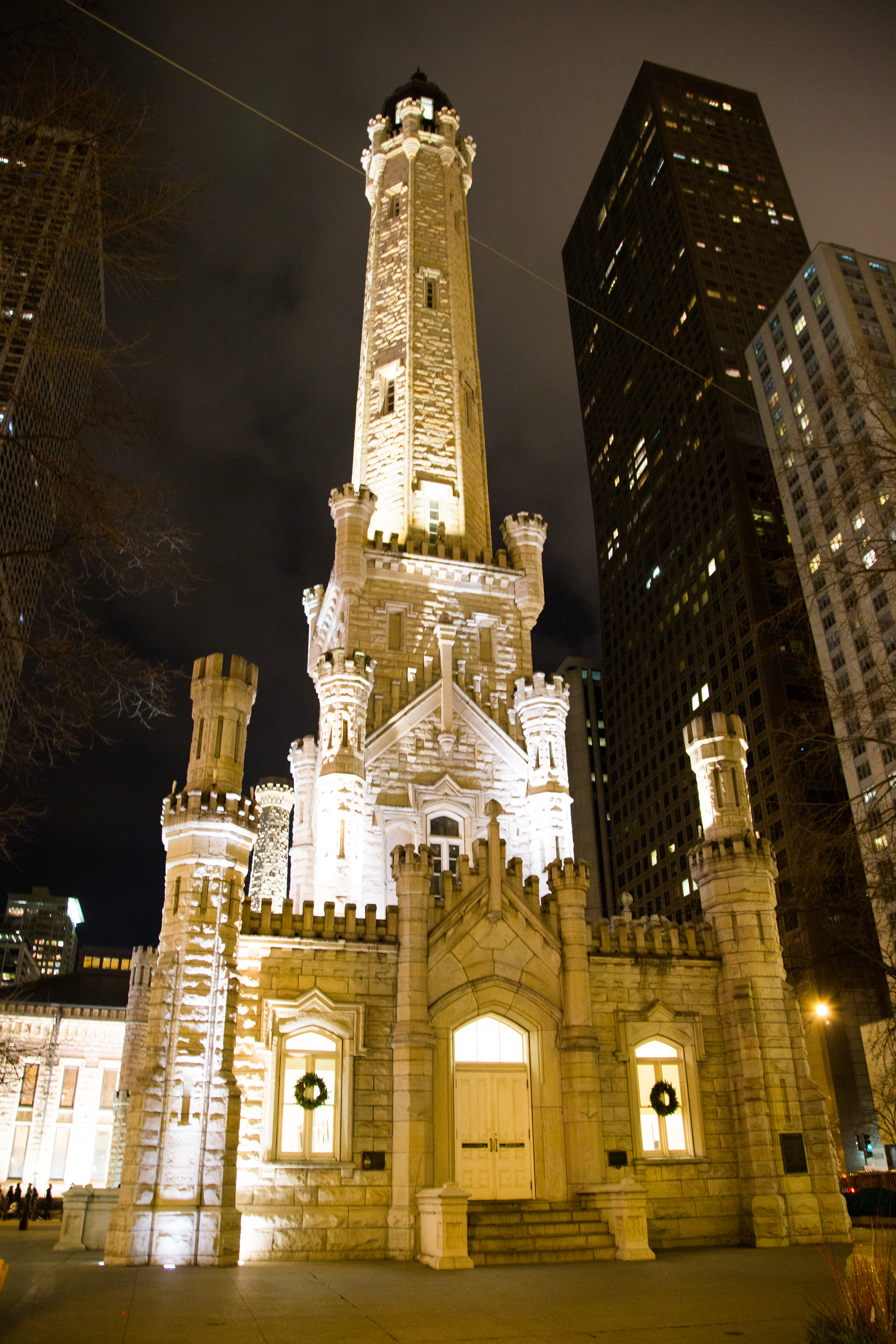
The Chicago Water Tower, a city landmark and the downtown campus' namesake

Dominated by mixed-use skyscrapers, campus buildings include the Corboy Law Center, Terry Student Center, Baumhart Hall, and landmark Lewis Towers, built in 1945 as the Illinois Catholic Women's Club, and today home of the Office of the President and the Loyola University Museum of Art. Recent construction includes the School of Communication which occupies the basement, first, and second floors of The Clare, a 587-foot tower that serves as a retirement community, and the LEED-certified John and Kathy Schreiber Center, which opened in 2015 as the new home of the Quinlan School of Business.

The campus is steps from the offices of major corporations, many retail and tourist destinations, as well as institutions like the Museum of Contemporary Art and the Newberry Library. Holy Name Cathedral, the seat of the Archdiocese of Chicago, is directly adjacent to the south.

=== Health Sciences Campus ===
Founded in 1969, along with the Loyola University Medical Center, the Health Sciences Campus in Maywood is the home of the Stritch School of Medicine, the Marcella Niehoff School of Nursing, and several programs that are part of the School of Continuing and Professional Studies. Maywood is a nearby western suburb of Chicago, approximately eleven miles from the Loop.

Loyola University Medical Center comprises the main hospital, Loyola Outpatient Center, Ronald McDonald Children's Hospital, Cardinal Bernardin Cancer Center, and several medical office and laboratory buildings. In 2011, the medical center was sold to Trinity Health, while Loyola continues to own and operate the academic buildings and select research facilities on campus.

In 2017, Loyola expanded its accelerated nursing program to an online-based format with lab in Downers Grove.

=== John Felice Rome Center ===
Loyola's permanent campus in Rome opened in 1962 at Casa Italiana Viaggi Internazionali Studenti (C.I.V.I.S.), a dormitory originally built to host athletes during the 1960 Summer Olympics. In 1978, the campus moved to its current location on Monte Mario, approximately two miles northwest of Vatican City. The campus is the home of the oldest American university program in Italy, and hosts students from both Loyola and other universities seeking to study abroad. In 2005, the campus was renamed in honor of founder and Director Emeritus John P. Felice.

=== Additional campuses ===
In 2010, Loyola founded the Retreat and Ecology Campus on the former site of the Resurrection Retreat Center in Woodstock, Illinois, an outer suburb approximately fifty miles northwest of Chicago. The campus houses the university's campus ministry programs, and offers a unique learning opportunity for students and faculty interested in the sciences. The property contains 20 acres (8 ha) of natural habitat that includes ponds, streams, woods, and prairie.

Loyola also owns and operates the Cuneo Mansion and Gardens in suburban Vernon Hills, Illinois, approximately thirty miles north of Chicago. The mansion and grounds were donated to the university in 2009, by the John and Herta Cuneo Foundation. The estate operates as a museum and hosts special events and a growing number of academic programs in business, education and law. Loyola has announced that it will cease operations there at the end of 2025 and is selling the site.

== Academics ==
Academic rankings

National
- Forbes: 258
- U.S. News & World Report: 121

Global
- QS: 1001-1200
- U.S. News & World Report: 949

	2025
New Freshman	2,763
Mean GPA	3.82
50% ACT Range	27-32
50% SAT Range	1200-1370

=== Tuition ===
For the 2025–2026 academic year, undergraduate tuition for new full-time students was $56,060 per year, not including room, board, fees, and the CTA student transit 'U-Pass'. Graduate school tuition varies, depending on the school.

=== Rankings and demographics ===
Loyola University Chicago was ranked 121st among "National Universities" according to the 2027 U.S. News & World Report college rankings.

Forbes ranked Loyola University Chicago 258th out of the top 500 rated private and public colleges and universities in America for the 2027 report. Loyola was also ranked 140th among private colleges and 48th in the Midwest.

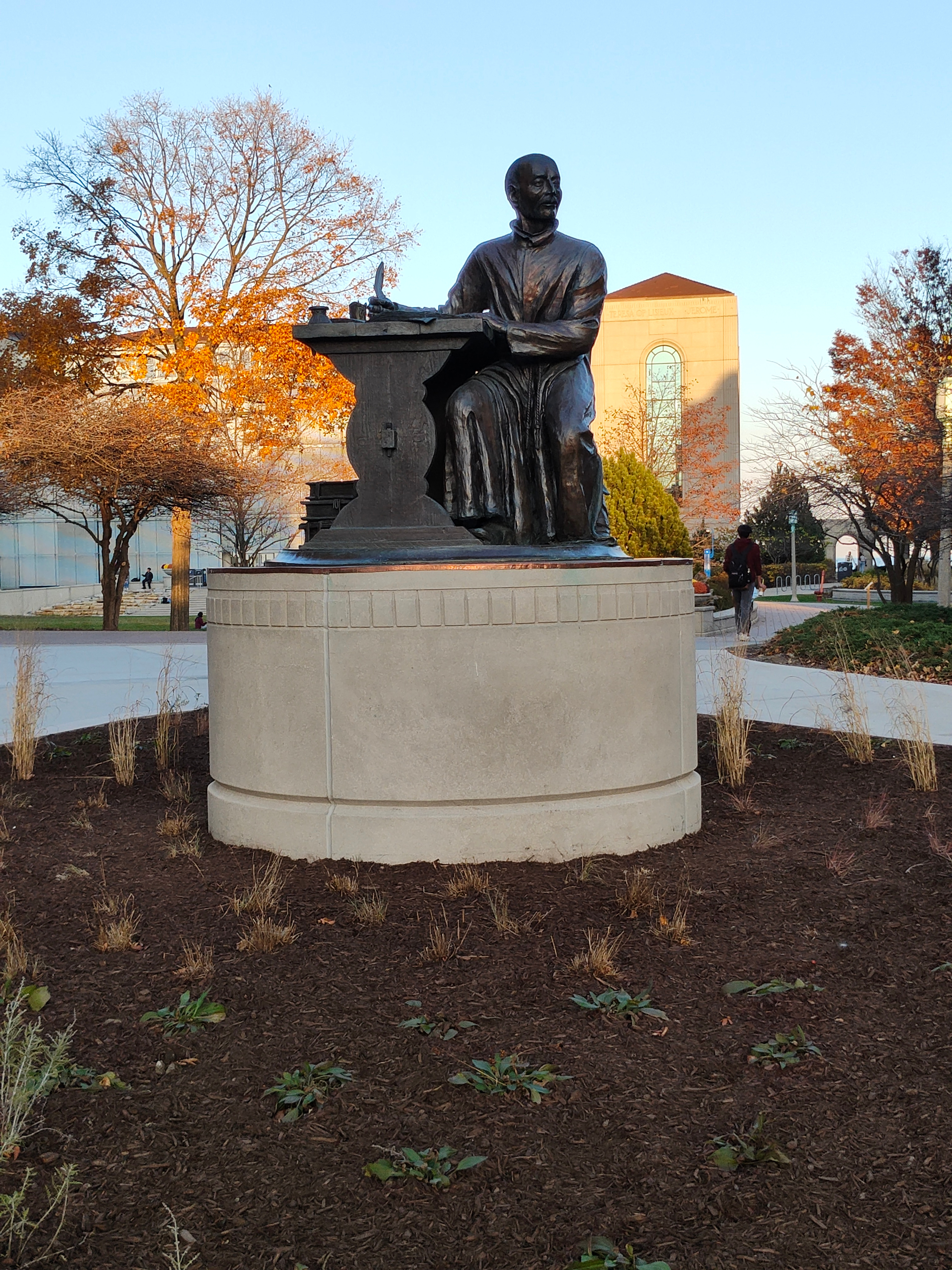
A statue of Ignatius of Loyola was dedicated in 2000 and sits outside Cuneo Hall.

=== Religious education ===
Loyola's Department of Theology offers undergraduate and graduate courses in the study of systematic theology, ethics, and Biblical studies, offering a diverse set of classes that are not limited to religious studies in a Catholic context.

Until 2025, Loyola hosted a Jesuit First Studies Program, one of three in the country, with Fordham University and Saint Louis University housing the other two. During a three-year period in the program, Jesuit scholastics and brothers generally studied philosophy and some theology. First Studies is one part of an eleven-year formation process toward the Jesuit priesthood. This program is administered by the Midwest Province of the Society of Jesus.

Until 2019, Loyola also hosted Saint Joseph College Seminary, which served the Catholic Archdiocese of Chicago and provided training to candidates for the diocesan priesthood.

=== Schools and colleges ===
Loyola Chicago is composed of the following schools and colleges:

- College of Arts & Sciences
- Quinlan School of Business
- School of Communication
- School of Continuing and Professional Studies
- School of Education
- The Graduate School
- School of Law
- Stritch School of Medicine
- Marcella Niehoff School of Nursing
- School of Social Work
- Arrupe College
- Parkinson School of Health Sciences and Public Health
- School of Environmental Sustainability

== Student life ==
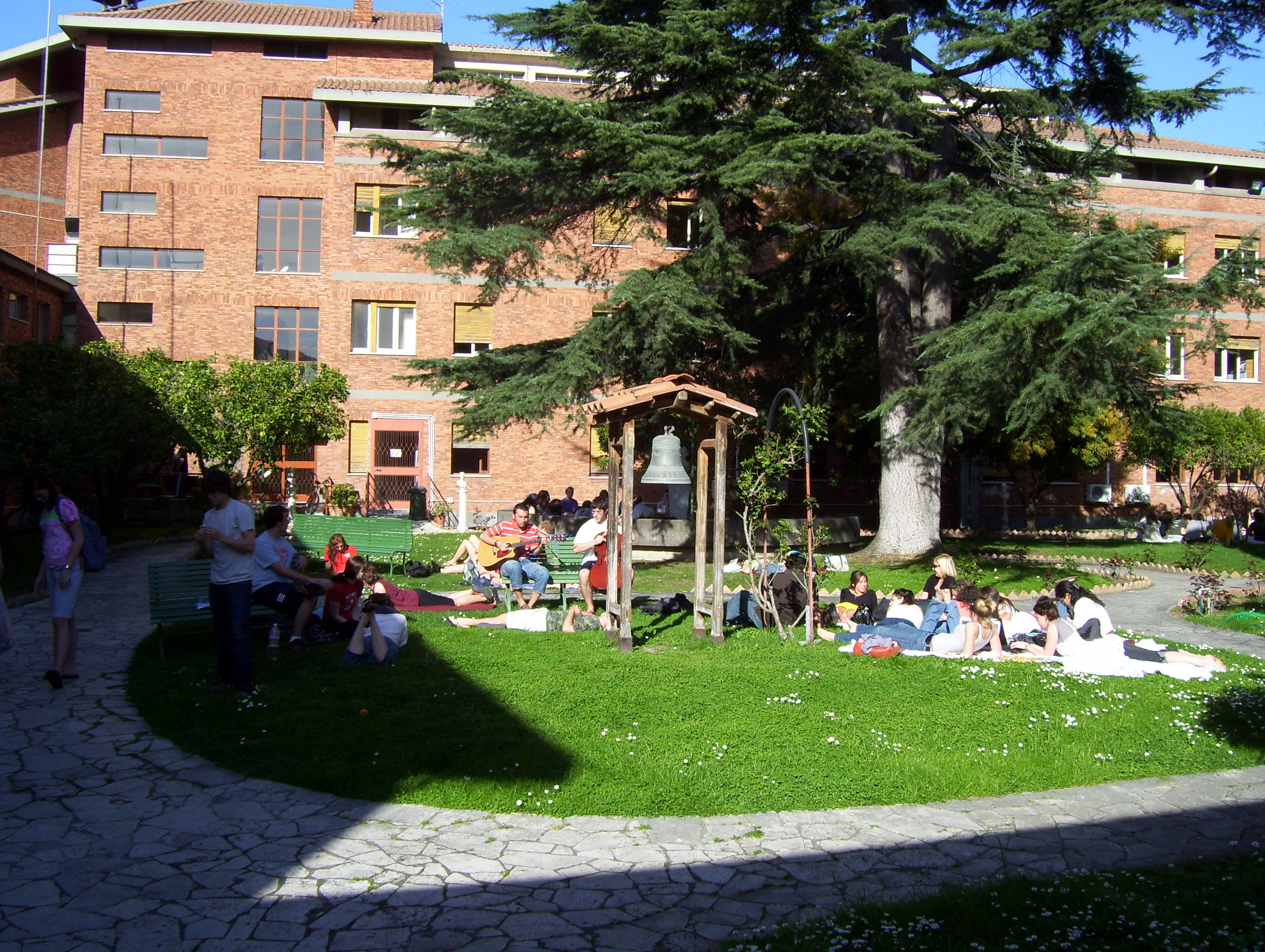
Students at the John Felice Rome Center, Rome, Italy

=== Residential life ===
Most of the residence halls and apartments managed by Loyola's Department of Residence Life are in the Rogers Park and Edgewater neighborhoods, surrounding the Lake Shore Campus. One, Baumhart Hall, is at the Water Tower Campus on the Magnificent Mile in Chicago. Most of Loyola's residence halls are named after other Jesuit colleges and universities.

=== Greek life ===
Loyola University Chicago is home to several Greek letter organizations. Among them are traditional social fraternities and sororities, professional co-ed fraternities, and cultural interest fraternities and sororities.

=== College radio station ===
Loyola University owned and operated a low-power, carrier current radio station, WLUC-AM, in the 1960s. Students broadcast an eclectic music format on 600 kHz to Lake Shore Campus buildings and the surrounding Rogers Park neighborhood. WLUC-AM was replaced by an on-air FM station, WLUW, in the 1970s.

=== Athletics ===
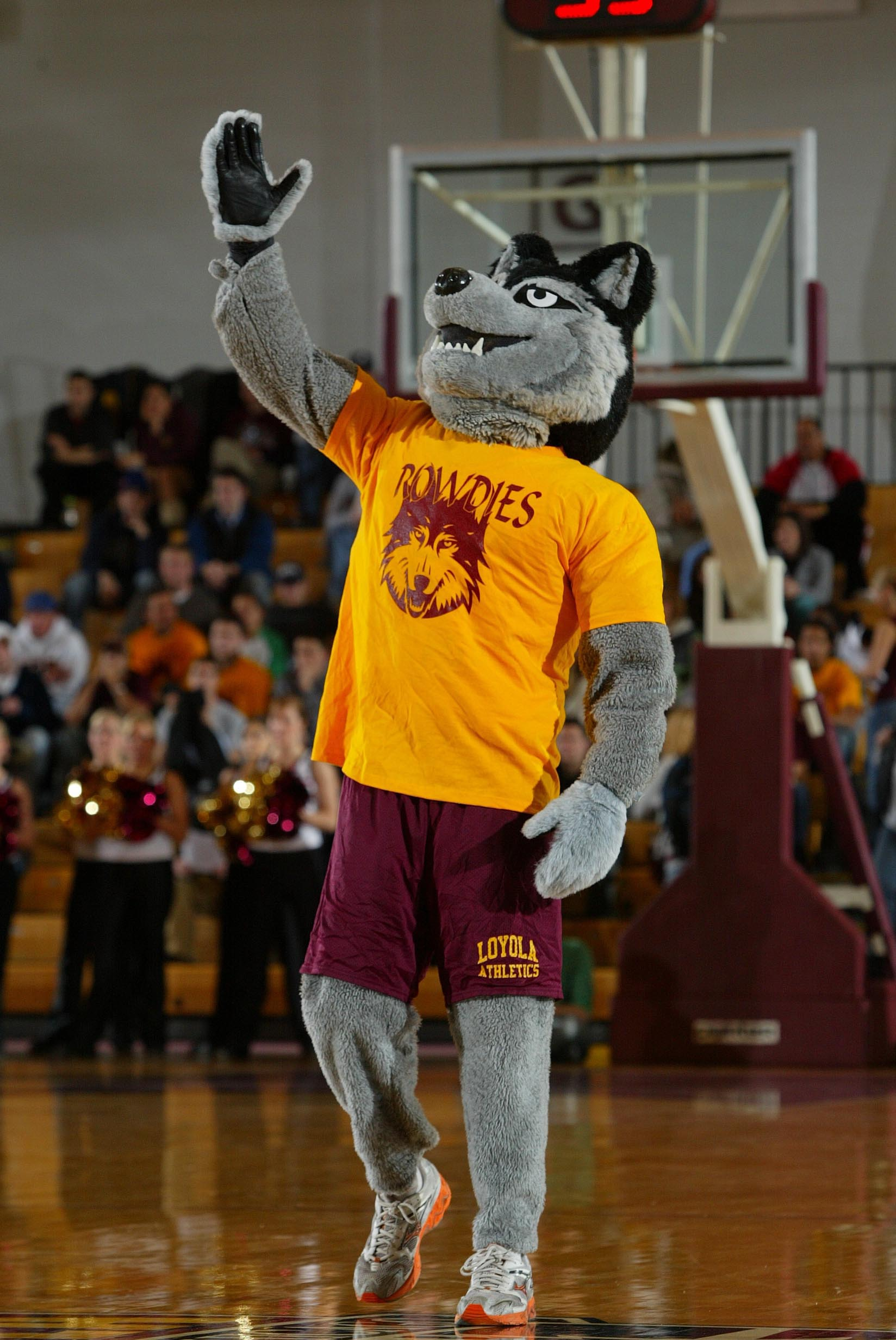
LU Wolf at a Loyola Men's basketball game

NCAA Division I National Championships (3): 1963 Men's Basketball, 2014 Men's Volleyball, 2015 Men's Volleyball

Loyola is home to 11 varsity teams, most of which compete in NCAA Division I. The teams include men and women's basketball, cross country, men and women's golf, men and women's soccer, softball, track, and men and women's volleyball. The nickname "Ramblers" was first applied to Loyola's football team in 1926, because they frequently traveled throughout the United States.

The LU Wolf is the mascot for the university. He was inspired by the coat of arms of St. Ignatius of Loyola, from whom Loyola derives its name, which depicts two wolves standing over a kettle. Taken from the heraldic crest carved in the lintel on St. Ignatius' family home in Azpeitia, Spain, the wolves and cauldron refer to the prosperity and generosity of the Loyola family, who, after feeding family, retainers and soldiers, had enough food to feed even the wild animals.

Loyola's men's basketball team, the Ramblers, won the 1963 national championship. Loyola is the only Division I NCAA school in Illinois to have won a national title in men's basketball. In 2018, they finished the NCAA tournament with the all-time highest win percentage of any team to have ever competed in the tournament.

The Loyola Ramblers men's volleyball team won back-to-back NCAA championships in 2014 and 2015.

In 2018, Loyola's men's basketball team won the Missouri Valley Conference tournament championship to qualify for the 2018 NCAA Division I men's basketball tournament, for the first time since 1985. The 11-seed Ramblers recorded four straight upset victories against the Miami Hurricanes, Tennessee Volunteers, Nevada Wolf Pack, and Kansas State Wildcats to advance to the Final Four. However, the Michigan Wolverines defeated Loyola in the Final Four.

In October 2018, the Loyola Ramblers Women's Soccer team won the Missouri Valley Conference regular season title with 6–1 win over Evansville. The win gave the Ramblers their first Missouri Valley Conference regular season title in program history.

== Notable alumni ==
- Awa III, 122nd Catholicos-Patriarch of the Assyrian Church of the East
- Leslie David Baker, actor (The Office)
- Lucas Bartlett, soccer player
- Ian Brennan, co-creator and writer (Glee, Scream Queens, The Politician)
- Susan Candiotti, CNN correspondent
- Shams Charania, reporter for ESPN
- William M. Daley, President Obama's White House Chief of Staff and former United States Secretary of Commerce under President Bill Clinton
- Timothy J. Danis, businessman, founder of RCP Advisors
- Sister Mary Clemente Davlin, noted medievalist and advocate for campus diversity
- David Draiman, lead singer of the band Disturbed
- Norman Geisler, president of Southern Evangelical Seminary in Charlotte, North Carolina
- Lori Greiner, inventor, investor, entrepreneur, and television personality
- Joseph C. Grendys, owner of Koch Foods
- Mary Gross, actress, comedian (Saturday Night Live)
- George Halas Jr., former president Chicago Bears
- Neil F. Hartigan, former Illinois Attorney General, candidate for Governor, former Lt. Governor
- Donte Ingram, professional basketball player.
- Bruce Lerman, cardiologist; Chief of the Division of Cardiology and Director of the Cardiac Electrophysiology Laboratory at Weill Cornell Medicine and the New York Presbyterian Hospital
- Marsha M. Linehan, founder of dialectical behavior therapy
- Lisa Madigan, Illinois Attorney General
- Michael Madigan, former Speaker of the Illinois House of Representatives and former chairman of the Democratic Party of Illinois
- Meredith Marks, television personality.
- Stanley Miarka, Negro League Baseball, second baseman (1950)
- Jennifer Morrison, actress (Once Upon a Time, House)
- James Mulvaney, businessman and lawyer, president of the United States National Bank of San Diego and the San Diego Padres (PCL)
- Jeffrey T. Nealon, 20th and 21st century philosopher, professor at Pennsylvania State University
- Bob Newhart, Emmy Award-, Grammy Award-, and Peabody Award-winning actor and comedian, The Bob Newhart Show and Newhart
- Michael R. Quinlan, McDonald's Corporation Chairman
- Todd Ricketts, co-owner of Chicago Cubs
- Thomas Schoewe, CFO of Wal-Mart Stores, Inc.
- William Scholl, founder of Dr. Scholl's footcare
- Fatih Takmaklı (1983-), Author
- Robert R. Thomas, former Chief Justice of the Supreme Court of Illinois
- Phil Weintraub, Major League Baseball player (1933–38, 44–45)
- John York, co-owner of the San Francisco 49ers

== See also ==
- List of Jesuit colleges in the United States
- List of Jesuit sites
