= Joseph Grendys =

American businessman

- Born: Joseph C. Grendys; 1961 or 1962 (age 64–65); Chicago, Illinois, US
- Education: Holy Cross High School (River Grove, Illinois); Loyola University (BBA)
- Occupations: Chairman, CEO, president and owner, Koch Foods

Joseph C. Grendys (born 1961 or 1962) is an American billionaire who is the chairman, chief executive officer (CEO) and president of Koch Foods, a chicken processing company. As of June 2022, his net worth was estimated at US$3.1 billion.

== Early life ==
Grendys was born in Chicago in the early 1960s. His father was a butcher who was also involved in the wholesale and retail meat trade. His grandparents emigrated to the United States from Poland.

He was educated at Holy Cross High School in River Grove and worked at Koch Foods part-time while a student. In 1984, he received a bachelor's degree in Finance and Marketing from Loyola University.

== Career ==
Grendys started full-time at Koch Foods in the mid-1980s, when it had just 13 employees. The owner, Fred Koch, was one of his father's customers and had started Koch Foods in 1973. He offered Grandys a 50% equity share in the business.

He bought out Fred Koch in 1992. Grendys's companies now slaughter, ship and sell chicken using the Koch Foods, Antioch Farms, Preferred Foods and Rogers Royal brands. Koch slaughters over 12 million chickens and processes over 50,000,000 pounds (23,000 t) of chicken every week.

In 2011, Koch employed 14,000 people, had an annual turnover of $2.8 billion, and was one of America's five largest "fully-integrated chicken processors."

In a 2014 interview, Grendys stated that he planned to acquire more companies and that he might branch out into another protein, but that he was "not sure what that protein would be yet." Rather than running a chicken company, he sees it as "the business of converting corn and soybeans into meat protein."

In August 2020, Forbes estimated his net worth at US$2.3 billion.

Koch Foods has been dogged by accusations of racism and abusive working conditions. On August 7, 2019, U.S. Immigration and Customs Enforcement raided several food processing plants in Mississippi, one of which was the Morton plant of Koch Foods. Three buses were used to shuttle off workers alleged to be undocumented.

== Personal life ==
Grendys lives "relatively modestly in the Chicago bungalow where he grew up and drives a beat-up old Cadillac." Grendys also owns a $3 million house in Chattanooga, Tenn.
