= Mary Kwasny =

American biostatistician

- Born: America
- Other names: Mary Morrissey Kwasny, Mary Morrissey, Mary Jeanne Kwasny
- Education: St. Ignatius College Prep, Harvard University
- Occupations: biostatistician, professor of preventative medicine
- Employer: Northwestern University
- Known for: biostatistics research
- Notable work: statistics of human versus computer solutions of Wordle
- Awards: Fellow of the American Statistical Association

Mary Morrissey Kwasny (also published as Mary Morrissey and as Mary Jeanne Kwasny) is an American biostatistician, a professor of preventative medicine in the division of biostatistics and informatics at the Northwestern University Feinberg School of Medicine. Her methodological research interests include longitudinal study data, and data misclassification and measurement errors; she has also studied the effects of behavioral interventions in health care. Beyond biostatistics, she has written about the statistics of human versus computer solutions of Wordle.

== Education and career ==
Kwasny is a 1988 graduate of St. Ignatius College Prep, a Jesuit Catholic high school in Chicago. She has a 1998 doctorate in biostatistics from Harvard University; her dissertation, Misclassification, Nonignorable Nonresponse, and Mismeasurement, was supervised by Donna Spiegelman.

She worked for the Rush University Medical Center in Chicago from 1999 to 2009, before moving to her present position at Northwestern University in 2009.

== Recognition ==
Kwasny was named as a Fellow of the American Statistical Association in 2015, "for innovative analyses of health-related longitudinal studies, her unique ability to extract clinically useful messages; for her outstanding collaborations, curriculum development, and teaching in biostatistics and epidemiology; and for her exceptional service". In 2023, she received the American Statistical Association Founders Award for distinguished service to the profession.
