= Arnold Damen =

Jesuit missionary

Fr. Arnold J. Damen, S.J.
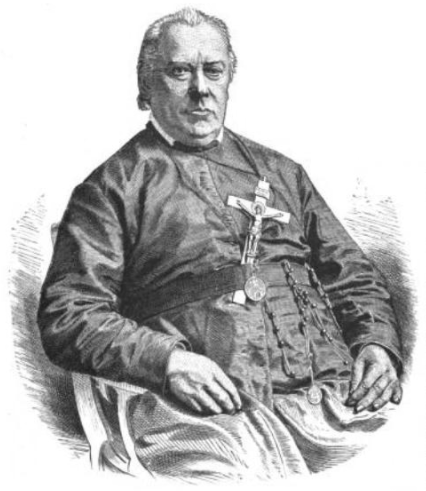
- Fr. Arnold J. Damen, S.J.
- Born: March 20, 1815; Leur, North Brabant
- Died: January 1, 1890 (aged 74); Omaha, Nebraska
- Burial place: Calvary Cemetery, St. Louis
- Other name: Father Damen
- Occupation: Jesuit priest
- Website: www.LUC.edu/jesuitheritage/frarnoldjdamensj

Fr. Arnold J. Damen, S.J. (1815–1890) was a Catholic priest of Dutch heritage. A missionary of the Society of Jesus, more commonly known as a Jesuit, and who is noted for bringing Jesuit education to Chicago.

== Biography ==
Damen was born in Leur, North Brabant (The Netherlands) on March 20, 1815, and joined the Jesuit missions in North America under Pierre-Jean De Smet. He trained at St. Stanislaus Novitiate in Florissant, Missouri, and was ordained in 1844. His first job was teaching at St. Louis University, but in 1847 he was appointed pastor of the college church of St. Francis Xavier in St. Louis. In 1857 he was sent to establish the first Jesuit presence in Chicago, where he founded Holy Family Parish, Saint Ignatius High School now St. Ignatius College Prep, as well as Saint Ignatius College which on October 23, 1909 was rechartered as Loyola University Chicago.

He died at Creighton College in Omaha, Nebraska, on January 1, 1890.

The City of Chicago honored him in 1927 by renaming Robey Street to Damen Avenue. He is also namesake of the Damen Student Center at Loyola University Chicago on the Lake Shore Campus, which opened in 2013.
