= Cuneo Museum =

Historic home, art collection and gardens in Illinois, US

Coordinates: 42.2501°N 87.9504°W

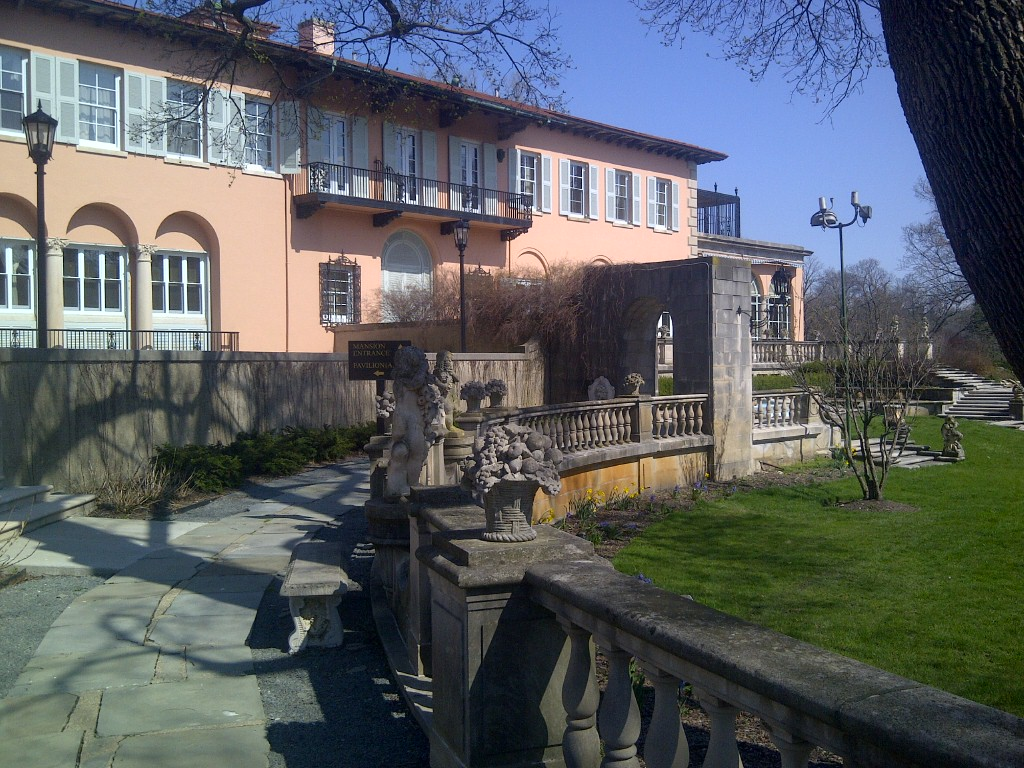

The Cuneo Mansion and Gardens are a historic home, art collection and gardens in Vernon Hills, Illinois, built in 1914 and designed by architect Benjamin Marshall of Marshall & Fox. The mansion's first owner was Samuel Insull, an original founder of the General Electric Company. John Cuneo, Sr. purchased the mansion in 1937 after the collapse of the Insull utility empire. Cuneo is best known as the founder of the Cuneo Press and Hawthorn Mellody Dairy. Cuneo had the interior of the Mansion painted with murals from Chicago Ecclesiological Muralist John Mallin. In 2009, the house was donated to Loyola University Chicago.

== Information ==
The mansion, which remained the family home until the death of Cuneo's widow in 1990, became an art gallery and historic house museum. It opened its doors to the public for the first time in 1991. The mansion's paintings, tapestries, and other furnishings are the result of the Cuneo family's lifelong collecting. In addition to architecture and art, Cuneo is also known for its grounds, designed by the renowned landscape architect Jens Jensen.

Starting in 1994, the Cuneo family allowed the Village of Vernon Hills to decorate the gardens with holiday lights. People were invited to drive through the "Winter Wonderland" light show. The annual show ended in 2014 when Loyola University decided to develop the land. Many of the decorations can still be seen around the Village during the holiday season.

In the past, interpretive tours of the mansion and its collections were conducted by museum guides and staff. The mansion is available for corporate meetings, wedding receptions, and special events.

The Mediterranean style mansion features an arcaded central hall, a lavish formal dining room and a private chapel. The collections include antique furnishings, Renaissance paintings, tapestries, silver and porcelain.

== Cuneo Museum in film ==
The Cuneo Museum has been the backdrop of several Hollywood films set in Chicago. Many of the outdoor wedding scenes and reception shots for the 1997 romantic comedy My Best Friend's Wedding, starring Julia Roberts and Cameron Diaz, were filmed at Cuneo Museum. The museum was also the setting for Witless Protection, starring Larry the Cable Guy, which appeared in 2008.
