= Notre Dame de Chicago =

Historic church in Illinois, United States

- U.S. National Register of Historic Places
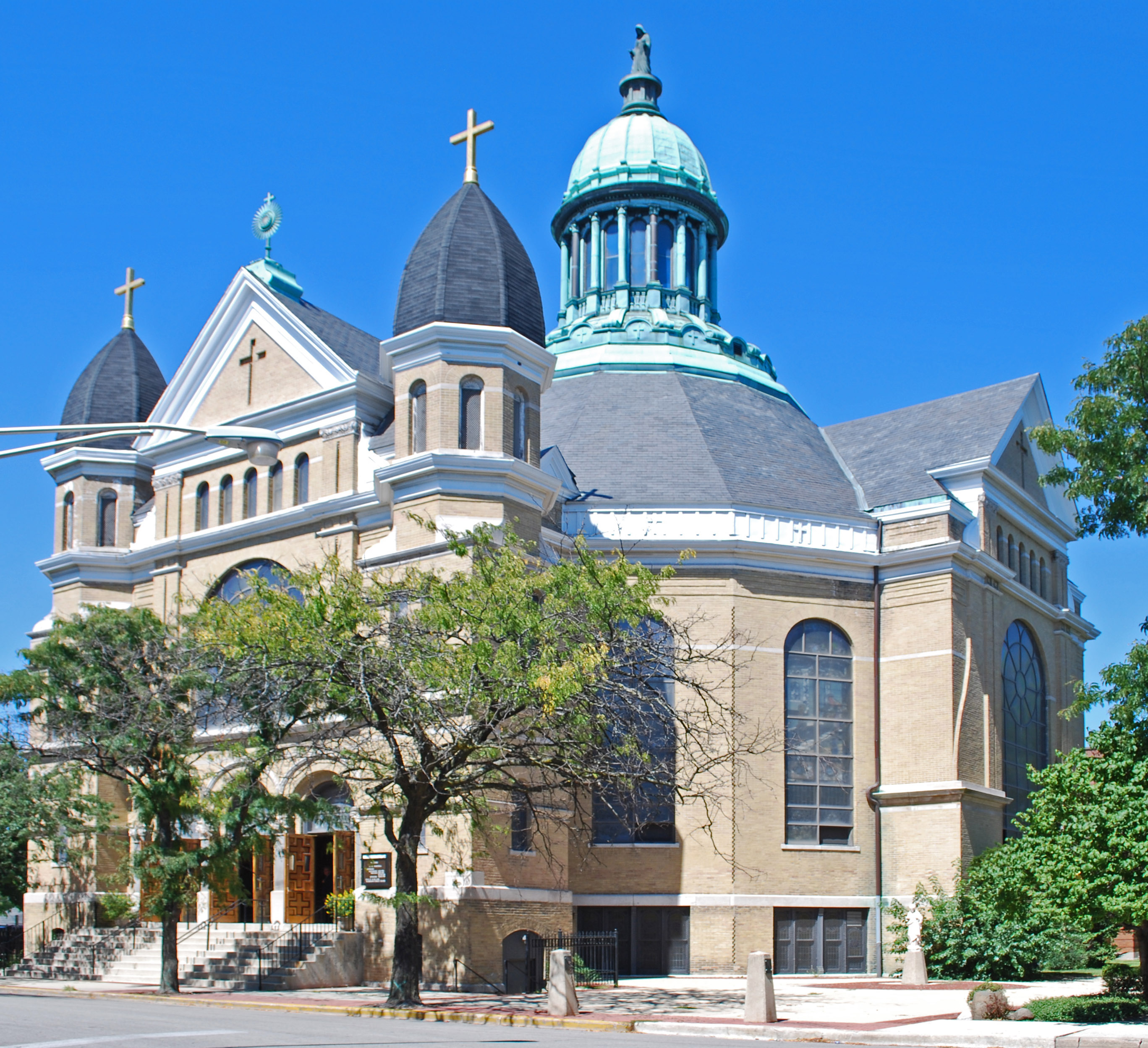

- Location within Chicago metropolitan area Location within Illinois Location within the United States
- Location: 1338 W. Flournoy St., Chicago, Illinois
- Coordinates: 41°52′24″N 87°39′39″W
- Area: less than one acre
- Built: 1889–92
- Architectural style: Neo-Romanesque
- NRHP reference No.: 79000826
- Added to NRHP: March 7, 1979

Notre Dame de Chicago is a Roman Catholic church in the Near West Side community area of Chicago, Illinois. The church was built from 1889 to 1892, replacing an earlier church built in 1865 at a different site. French Canadian architect Gregoire Vigeant designed the church in the Romanesque Revival style; the design has a heavy French influence which can be seen in its Greek cross layout, its hipped roofs and square domes, and the emphasis on height suggested by its two cupolas and its lantern. Due to the declining size of its original French congregation, the Archdiocese of Chicago gave control of the church to the Fathers of the Blessed Sacrament in 1918. The church hosted the International Eucharistic Congress in 1926.

As the successor to the St. Louis Church, the first French church in Chicago, Notre Dame de Chicago represents a significant part of the history of French immigrants in Chicago. The church has been called "the best extant landmark associated with the French in Chicago" and "the only surviving French monument" in the city. Due to its importance to the history of the French community and its architectural significance, the church was added to the National Register of Historic Places on March 7, 1979.

From 1994 to 2006, the rectory of the church housed Casa Jesus, a house of formation and discernment for Hispanic seminarians in the Archdiocese of Chicago.

In January 2019, it was announced that the parish would be merged with nearby Holy Family Church as part of the Chicago Archdiocese's reconfiguration plan. A pastor for both parishes would say Masses in both locations but be based out of Notre Dame, with Holy Family still available for special events and weddings. The merger took effect in July 2019.
