= Casa Jesus =

Closed Catholic house of formation

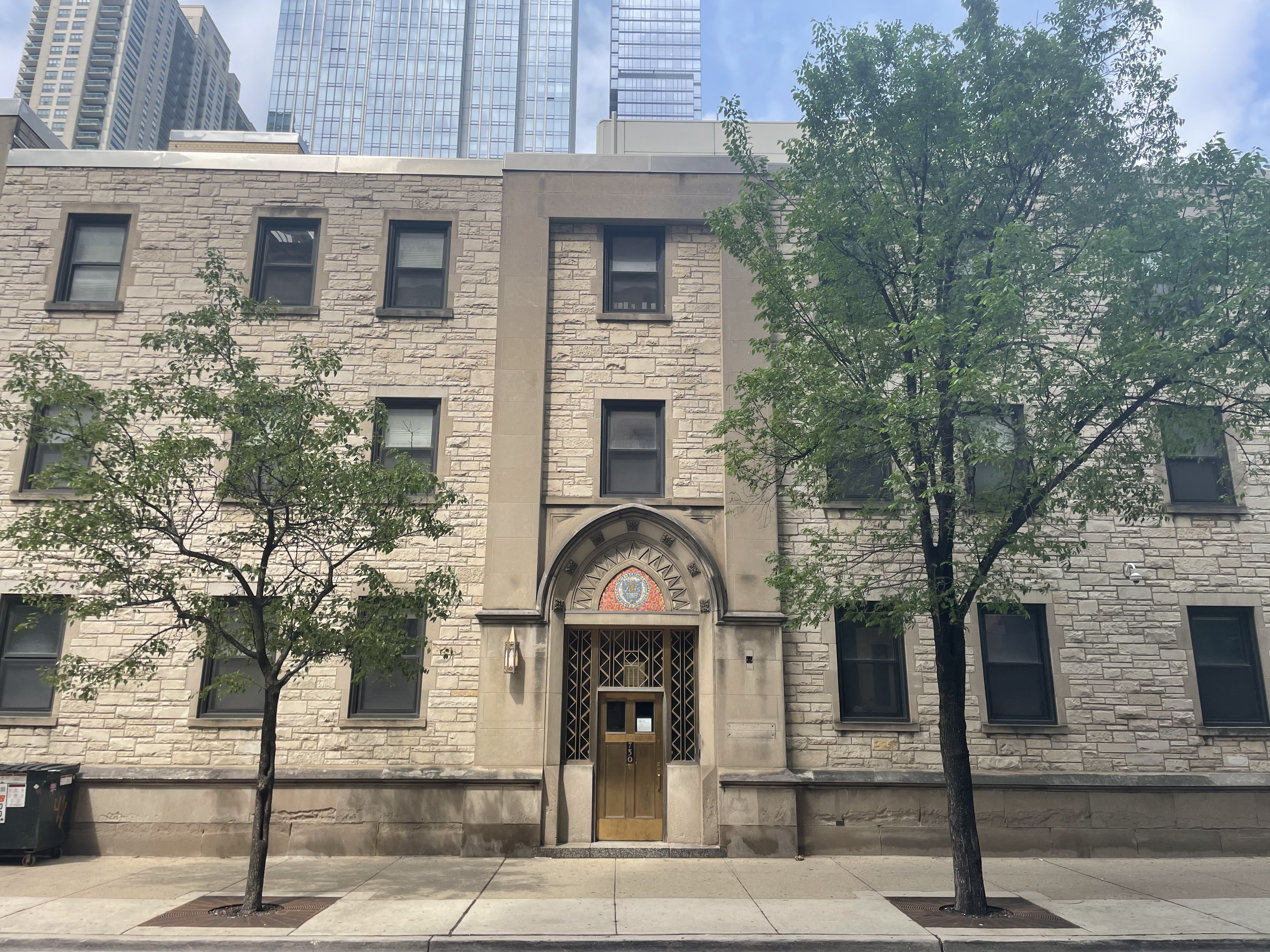
- The former Casa Jesus building at 750 Wabash Avenue.
- Type: Catholic Seminary
- Active: 1987–2016
- Founders: Arturo Perez and Silviano Filipetti
- Parent institution: Archdiocese of Chicago
- Religious affiliation: Roman Catholic
- Location: 750 Wabash Ave; Chicago, IL, 60611, Chicago, Illinois; 41.8964°N 87.6270°W
- Campus: Urban

Casa Jesus (English: House of Jesus) was a Roman Catholic house of formation of the Archdiocese of Chicago which opened in 1987. Its primary purpose was to educate Latin-American candidates for priesthood. It was closed in 2016 after a former rector was charged with the possession of child pornography.

== History ==
=== Founding ===
Due to the increasing number of Spanish-speaking Catholics in the Archdiocese of Chicago, Fr. Arturo Perez and Fr. Silviano Filipetto had the idea of creating a house of discernment and formation where Hispanic men could prayerfully consider the priesthood. In 1987, both the archdiocese and Cardinal Joseph Bernardin accepted the proposal. The program, initially based out of the rectory of St. Casmir Church in Little Village, began recruiting young Latin-American men from around Chicago.

Men participating in the program lived and prayed in community, learned English, and engaged in catechetical and youth ministry in the archdiocese. Once proficient in English, men in the program transferred either to Mundelein Seminary or St. Joseph College Seminary, usually after a year. In 1990, due to parish mergers, Fr. Perez left the program and Fr. Filipetto continued as the director of Casa Jesus, before being succeeded as director by Fr. David Ford in 1992.

In 1994, Fr. Michael Herman became the director and the program moved to the grounds of Notre Dame de Chicago parish, in part to be closer to the site of the program's English studies at the University of Illinois Chicago. It was also at this time that the program began to recruit internationally, initially in Colombia but then expanding to include Mexico, Ecuador, Peru, and other Latin American countries, drawing both from men who had prior seminary experience and those who had been working in the outside world. Herman continued in pastoral work in Chicago until the mid-2000s, when he left ministry to live as an out gay man.

Robert Casey became the fourth rector in 1998, serving in that role until 2003.

=== Move to Holy Name Cathedral convent ===
By 2006, after bring based out of Notre Dame du Chicago for over a decade, Francis George moved the program to a former convent at Holy Name Cathedral. Three years later that property also began to house the Polish counterpart of Casa Jesus, Bishop Abramowicz Seminary, which served a similar purpose for Polish-speaking men. Fr. Octavio Muñoz, an alumnus of the program ordained in 2004, was named rector in 2009.

In 2012, both programs housed at the Holy Name convent were moved to facilities at St. Ita's Church to allow for major renovations at the Cathedral convent property. These changes to the building were in part to facilitate Cardinal George to reside in the convent along with the men in formation following his retirement. The renovations were completed in May 2013. By 2012, 42 alumni of the program had been ordained priests for the Archdiocese of Chicago, with 260 men having participated in the program since its founding in 1987.

=== Closure ===
On July 7, 2015, Fr. Kevin Hays, who was replacing Muñoz as rector, was touring Muñoz's former apartment with an employee. A laptop was discovered that was streaming what appeared to be child pornography. The employee did not initially report the incident as he believed Hays would do so; however, Hays did not and stated he had not seen the images. The Chicago archdiocese contacted private investigators on July 20, 2015, but did not contact the police until ten days after the report.

Muñoz was removed from ministry and had his priestly faculties withdrawn on July 28, 2015, and was sent to treatment at the Saint Luke Institute. In September 2016, Muñoz was charged with one count of possession of child pornography. He was then extradited from Maryland and arrested in Chicago the following August, facing a prison sentence of up to three years. Casa Jesus operations were quietly suspended in September 2016. At the time of its closing, the seminary had 10 graduates studying at Mundelein Seminary, one at St. Joseph Seminary, and four at the College of Lake County.

In 2025 the Casa Jesus building began to house propaedeutic stage seminarians studying at Mundelein Seminary.

== Other misconduct allegations ==
At least 11 priests of the 42 men who graduated from the Casa Jesus program have either been removed from priestly ministry or been involved in criminal proceedings due to illicit sexual activity, leading Rod Dreher to describe the institution as "dogged with homosexual misconduct". In 2002, Domingo Hurtado-Badillo, who prior had pled guilty to misdemeanor public indecency after being found performing a sex act on another man, was accused in a civil suit of taking fellow Casa Jesus students to gay bars in Chicago as well as sexually assaulting fellow students. In 2003, another priest alumni of the program reportedly committed a sexual assault in the Chicago suburb of Palatine. In 2015, Luis Stalin, a former participant in the Casa's program, said that he would go to gay bars in Chicago and bring fellow seminarians with him, stating celibacy was ignored by seminary staff. Two priests with ties to the program were arrested in Miami in 2016 for lewd conduct after allegedly being engaged in a sex act in a parked car. A graduate of the program, Xamie Reyes, was removed from priestly ministry in the Chicago archdiocese in 2025 following accusations of sexual misconduct with seminarians.

== Notable alumni ==
- José Maria Garcia Maldonado
- Alberto Rojas

== Rectors/directors ==
1. Fr. Silvano Filipetto: 1987–1992
2. Fr. David Ford: 1992–1994
3. Fr. Michael Herman: 1994–1999
4. Fr. Robert Gerald Casey: 1998–2003
5. Fr. Alejandro Garrido: 2003–2009
6. Fr. Octavio Muñoz: 2009–2015
7. Fr. Kevin Hays: 2015
