= José Maria Garcia Maldonado =

Mexican-American bishop-elect

His Excellency, The Most Reverend José Maria Garcia Maldonado
- Auxiliary Bishop of Chicago; Titular Bishop of Fallaba
- Archdiocese: Chicago
- Appointed: December 20, 2024
- Installed: February 26, 2025
- Other post: Titular Bishop of Fallaba

Orders
- Ordination: May 17, 2008 by Francis Eugene George
- Consecration: February 26, 2025 by Blase J. Cupich, Robert Gerald Casey, and Jeffrey S. Grob

Personal details
- Born: March 24, 1979 (age 47) San Julián, Jalisco, Mexico
- Education: Mundelein Seminary
- Motto: Jesu Cristo mi defensa y remedio (Jesus Christ my defense and remedy)

Styles of José Maria Garcia Maldonado
- Reference style: His Excellency; The Most Reverend
- Spoken style: Your Excellency
- Religious style: Bishop

José Maria Garcia Maldonado (born March 24, 1979) is a Mexican-born prelate of the Roman Catholic Church who has been serving as an auxiliary bishop for the Archdiocese of Chicago in Illinois since 2025.

== Early life ==
Garcia Maldonado was born March 24, 1979, in San Julián, Jalisco in Mexico. After attending the public schools in San Julián, he decided to become a priest. Garcia Maldonado entered the minor seminary of the Diocese of San Juan de los Lagos in Arendas. He then studied philosophy at the major seminary of the diocese.

Garcia Maldonado immigrated to the United States in 2001 to join his family there. He entered the Casa Jesus Program of the Archdiocese of Chicago in 2002, then continued his preparation for the priesthood at the Mundelein Seminary in Mundelein, Illinois. He received a Master of Divinity degree in 2007.

== Priesthood ==
On May 17, 2008, Garcia Maldonado was ordained to the priesthood at St. Juliana Church in Chicago by Cardinal Francis Eugene George. After his ordination, the archdiocese assigned Garcia Maldonado as associate pastor at the Shrine of Our Lady of Guadalupe in Des Plaines, Illinois. He was later transferred to Good Shepherd Parish in Chicago to serve as administrator and pastor. In 2021, the archdiocese named Garcia Maldonado as pastor of St. Jose Sanchez del Rio Parish in Chicago.

During this period, Garcia Maldonado also worked as assistant director of vocations at St. Joseph's College Seminary at Loyola University of Chicago. In addition, he served as dean of Vicariate IVC and IVA.

== Episcopacy ==
Pope Francis appointed Garcia Maldonado as the titular bishop of Fallaba and as an auxiliary bishop of Chicago on December 20, 2024. He was consecrated as a bishop on February 26, 2025, by Cardinal Blase Cupich at Holy Name Cathedral in Chicago.

== See also ==
- Catholic Church hierarchy
- Catholic Church in the United States
- Historical list of the Catholic bishops of the United States
- List of Catholic bishops of the United States
- Lists of patriarchs, archbishops, and bishops

== Episcopal succession ==
Catholic Church titles
Preceded by -	Auxiliary Bishop of Chicago; 2025-Present	Succeeded by -
