= Kenard Gibbs =

Kenard Eugene Gibbs
- Born: August 1, 1964 (age 61)
- Education: Williams College, Northwestern University Kellogg Graduate School of Management
- Occupations: Chief Executive Officer of Soul Train Holdings, co-founder of MadVision Entertainment

Kenard Eugene Gibbs (born August 1, 1964) is the chief x executive officer of Soul Train Holdings and co-founder of MadVision Entertainment.

== Education ==
Gibbs attended Saint Ignatius College Prep high school, before moving on to Williams College. There, he deepened his understanding of businesses through internships and connections with business leaders. While working at Leo Burnett Worldwide Advertising Agency, he earned a master's degree from the Northwestern University Kellogg Graduate School of Management, focusing in marketing and finance.

== Career ==
Gibbs is an executive producer of African-American focused media, including award shows and documentaries. His early career focused on business development at companies including as Northern Trust Bank and Leo Burnett. He later served as president of Vibe magazine from 1999 to 2006. After this post he served as Group Publisher of Ebony and Jet magazines, and also served as President of Ebony/Jet Entertainment Group, which further integrated the stories of two brands into television and on the web.

Gibbs is currently involved with Soul Train Holdings where he has developed a number of license deals that have extended the brand into home DVD, cruise feature film, and lottery game-based extensions. He continues to expand his reach within the African American community through developing new entertainment, refreshing existing programs, and discovering new talent.

In addition, he has emphasized his role as an executive producer. He has helped create several new awards shows, including the Vibe Awards, in conjunction with the UPN network. His work also extends to documentaries, including the 2011 Emmy-nominated Soul Train: The Hippest Trip in America and Ebony Fashion Fair: 50 Years of Style.

Gibbs lives in New York with his family. He often participates on numerous panels, and as a guest lecturer on issues related to creation of urban based content and the changing new media landscape.
