= Donna Spiegelman =

Biostatistician and epidemiologist

Donna Spiegelman is a biostatistician and epidemiologist who works at the interface between the two fields as a methodologist, applying statistical solutions to address potential biases in epidemiologic studies.

== Area of work ==
Spiegelman's area of work includes methods for statistical corrections for exposure measurement error, environmental and nutritional epidemiology, HIV/AIDS epidemiology, prevention of cervical cancer and cardiometabolic diseases. Since 2018, Spiegelman's work has been oriented towards the methods for, and the practice of, implementation and prevention science.

== Career ==
Since 1992 Spiegelman has held faculty appointments at the Tufts University School of Medicine, and in the Departments of Epidemiology, Biostatistics, Nutrition and Global Health at Harvard T.H. Chan School of Public. In 2018 she moved to Biostatistics at Yale School of Public Health. She received the NIH Director’s Pioneer Award in 2014, to advance the emerging field of implementation science to promote the global and domestic health agenda by the development and dissemination of new methods for implementation science. In 2018 became the inaugural Director of the Center for Methods in Implementation and Prevention Science at Yale.

Spiegelman began her career in public health began in the late 1970s as a statistical analyst in the Occupational Health Program in the Department of Environmental Health at Harvard School of Public Health (HSPH). After deciding to return for a graduate degree, she was admitted to both the Departments of Epidemiology and Biostatistics at HSPH. She wrote her dissertation on the design and analysis of epidemiologic investigations in the presence of errors in the measurement and classification of the exposure variable and received her Sc.D. in 1989. In 1992, she returned to Harvard to become Assistant Professor of Epidemiologic Methods, and by 2001, she was promoted to full Professor with tenure, in the Departments of Epidemiology and Biostatistics, and later joined the Departments of Nutrition and Global Health at Harvard as well. In 2018, after retiring from Harvard as Professor Emerita of Epidemiologic Methods in the Departments of Epidemiology, Biostatistics, Nutrition and Global Health, she became Susan Dwight Bliss Professor of Biostatistics and inaugural director of Yale’s Center on Methods for Implementation and Prevention Science (CMIPS) CMIPS has grown to include five primary faculty and an increasing number of trainees, research scientists, and graduate students. With the recent establishment of the Implementation Science Methods Pathway with the Masters of Science and Ph.D. programs in the Department of Biostatistics at Yale, interest and expertise in implementation science methods will further advance.

Spiegelman has pursued this interest in measurement error throughout her career, holding two longstanding grants from the National Institutes of Health to study statistical methods to account for exposure uncertainty in environmental epidemiology and in cancer epidemiology, since in 2004. As a post-doctoral fellow at the Channing Laboratory at Harvard Medical School in the early 1990s, she began a decades long collaboration with the Principal Investigators of the Nurses’ Health Studies and the Health Professionals Follow-up Study.

Spiegelman was named a Fellow of the American Statistical Association in 2001. She was awarded Reviewer of the Year, American Journal of Public Health’s Editor’s Choice Award in 2017. She received Mentoring Award from the Committee on the Advancement of Women Faculty, Harvard T.H. Chan School of Public Health, in 2018, along with the Distinguished Service Award from the Department of Epidemiology.

== Community services ==
Spiegelman has been engaged in Jewish peace advocacy throughout her adult life. In 2002, she co-founded the U.S. Jewish peace organization, Brit Tzedek v’Shalom, which was integrated into the Jewish peace lobby, JStreet, in 2010. Spiegelman played an instrumental role in this integration, which provided the community basis for the growth and impact of JStreet. The goal of these organizations is to achieve a two-state solution to the Israeli–Palestinian conflict, by influencing the U.S. government as American Jews to support this approach in their geopolitical interactions.

In 2006, she co-founded Friends of Cambridge Rindge and Latin School, a 501(C)3 non-profit devoted to increasing equity and opportunity at this high school, Cambridge Rindge and Latin School.

== Notable publications ==
Methods for adjusting for bias due to measurement error and misclassification

- Rosner, B; Spiegelman, D; Willett, WC (1990). "Correction of logistic regression relative risk estimates and confidence intervals for measurement error: the case of multiple covariates measured with error". American Journal of Epidemiology. 132 (4): 734–745. doi:10.1093/oxfordjournals.aje.a115715. PMID 2403114.
- Rosner, B; Spiegelman, D; Willett, WC (1992). "Correction of logistic regression relative risk estimates and confidence intervals for random within-person measurement error". American Journal of Epidemiology. 136 (11): 1400–1413. doi:10.1093/oxfordjournals.aje.a116453. PMID 1488967.
- Spiegelman, D; Rosner, B; Logan, R (2000). "Estimation and inference for logistic regression with covariate misclassification and measurement error in main study/validation study designs". Journal of the American Statistical Association. 95 (449): 51–61. doi:10.1080/01621459.2000.10473898.
- Spiegelman, D; Zhao, B; Kim, J (2005). "Correlated errors in biased surrogates: study designs and methods for measurement error correction". Statistics in Medicine. 24 (11): 1657–1682. doi:10.1002/sim.2055. PMID 15736283.
- iao, X; Zhou, X; Wang, M; Hart, JE; Laden, F; Spiegelman, D (2018). "Survival analysis with functions of mismeasured covariate histories: the case of chronic air pollution exposure in relation to mortality in the nurses' health study". Journal of the Royal Statistical Society Series C: Applied Statistics. 67 (2): 307–327. doi:10.1111/rssc.12229. PMC 5801717. PMID 29430064.

Methods for implementation and prevention science

- Ritz, J; Spiegelman, D (2004). "Equivalence of conditional and marginal regression models for clustered and longitudinal data". Statistical Methods in Medical Research. 13 (4): 309–3. doi:10.1191/0962280204sm368ra.
- Spiegelman, D; Hertzmark, E (2005). "Easy SAS calculations for risk or prevalence ratios and differences". American Journal of Epidemiology. 162 (3): 199–200. doi:10.1093/aje/kwi188. PMID 15987728.
- Spiegelman, D; Hertzmark, E; Wand, HC (2007). "Point and interval estimates of partial population attributable risks in cohort studies: examples and software". Cancer Causes & Control. 18 (5): 571–579. doi:10.1007/s10552-006-0090-y. PMID 17387622.
- Zhou, Xin; Liao, Xiaomei; Kunz, Lauren M.; Normand, Sharon-Lise T.; Wang, Molin; Spiegelman, Donna (2020). "A maximum likelihood approach to power calculations for stepped wedge designs of binary outcomes". Biostatistics. 21 (1): 102–121. doi:10.1093/biostatistics/kxy031. PMC 7410259. PMID 30084949.
- Spiegelman, D; VanderWeele, TJ (2017). "Evaluating Public Health Interventions: 6. Modeling Ratios or Differences? Let the Data Tell Us". American Journal of Public Health. 107 (7): 1087–1091. doi:10.2105/AJPH.2017.303810. PMC 5463222. PMID 28590865.
- Spiegelman, D; Khudyakov, P; Wang, M; Vanderweele, TJ (2018). "Evaluating Public Health Interventions 7. Let the Subject Matter Choose the Effect Measure: Ratio, Difference, or Something Else Entirely". American Public Health Association. 108 (1): 73–76. doi:10.2105/AJPH.2017.304105. PMC 5719681. PMID 29161073.
- Spiegelman, D; Zhou, X (2018). "Evaluating Public Health Interventions: 8. Causal Inference for Time-Invariant Interventions". American Journal of Public Health. 108 (9): 1187–1190. doi:10.2105/AJPH.2018.304530. PMC 6085031. PMID 30024804.
- Nevo, Daniel; Lok, Judith J.; Spiegelman, Donna (2021). "Analysis of "learn-as-you-go" (LAGO) studies". The Annals of Statistics. 49 (2): 793–819. arXiv:1808.06310. doi:10.1214/20-aos1978. PMC 9067111. PMID 35510045.
- Nevo, D; Liao, X; Spiegelman, D (2017). "Estimation and Inference for the Mediation Proportion". International Journal of Biostatistics. 13 (2) 20170006. doi:10.1515/ijb-2017-0006. PMC 6014631. PMID 28930628.

Methods for meta-analysis and pooling projects and consortia

- Takkouche, B; Cadarso-Suarez, C; Spiegelman, D (1999). "Evaluation of old and new tests of heterogeneity in epidemiologic meta-analysis". American Journal of Epidemiology. 150 (2): 206–215. doi:10.1093/oxfordjournals.aje.a009981. PMID 10412966.
- Ritz, J; Demidenko, E; Spiegelman, D (2008). "Multivariate meta-analysis for data consortia, individual patient meta-analysis, and pooling projects". Journal of Statistical Planning and Inference. 138 (7): 1919–1933. doi:10.1016/j.jspi.2007.07.004.
- Smith-Warner, SA; Spiegelman, D; Ritz, J; Albanes, D; Beeson, WL; Bernstein, L; Berrino, F; van den Brandt, PA; Buring, JE; Cho, E; Colditz, GA; Folsom, AR; Freudenheim, JL; Giovannucci, E; Goldbohm, RA; Graham, S; Harnack, L; Horn-Ross, PL; Krogh, V; Leitzmann, MF; McCullough, ML; Miller, AB; Rodriguez, C; Rohan, TE; Schatzkin, A; Shore, R; Virtanen, M; Willett, WC; Wolk, A; Zeleniuch-Jacquotte, A; Zhang, SM; Hunter, DJ (2006). "Methods for pooling results of epidemiologic studies: the Pooling Project of Prospective Studies of Diet and Cancer". American Journal of Epidemiology. 163 (11): 1053–1064. doi:10.1093/aje/kwj127. PMID 16624970.
