= St. Ignatius College Prep =

Saint Ignatius College Preparatory School

Location
- 1076 West Roosevelt Road; Chicago, Illinois 60608-1594; United States; 41°52′3″N 87°39′15″W

Information
- Type: Private college-preparatory school
- Motto: Ad Majorem Dei Gloriam (For the Greater Glory of God) unofficial motto: "Ignatius starts with I and ends with us"
- Religious affiliation: Catholic
- Denomination: Jesuit
- Patron saint: Ignatius of Loyola
- Established: 1869; 157 years ago
- Founder: Fr. Arnold Damen, S.J.
- Authority: Archdiocese of Chicago
- Oversight: Society of Jesus
- CEEB code: 141170
- NCES School ID: 01601838
- President: John J. Chandler
- Principal: Dr. Sterling Brown
- Teaching staff: 87.6 (on an FTE basis)
- Grades: 9–12
- Gender: Coeducational
- Enrollment: 1,373 (2019–2020)
- Average class size: 25
- Student to teacher ratio: 16:3
- Hours in school day: 7
- Campus size: 23 acres (9.3 ha)
- Campus type: Urban
- Colors: Maroon and gold
- Athletics conference: CCL; GCAC
Sports
- Baseball
- Basketball
- Softball
- Ice Hockey
- Volleyball
- Football
- Chess
- Field hockey
- Rowing
- Soccer
- Lacrosse
- Rugby
- Tennis
- Water polo
- Golf
- Sailing
- Swimming
- Diving
- Mascot: Wolf
- Team name: Wolfpack
- Accreditation: NCA
- Publication: Phantasm
- Newspaper: Spirit
- Yearbook: Prep
- Endowment: $34 million
- School fees: $2,000
- Annual tuition: $22,600 (2025-2026)
- Affiliation: JSEA NCEA
- Website: www.ignatius.org
- St. Ignatius College Prep
- U.S. National Register of Historic Places
- Chicago Landmark
- Location within Chicago metropolitan area Location within Illinois Location within the United States
- Location: Chicago, Illinois
- Coordinates: 41°52′3″N 87°39′15″W
- Built: 1870
- Architect: Toussaint Menard
- Architectural style: Second Empire
- NRHP reference No.: 77000480

Significant dates
- Added to NRHP: November 17, 1977
- Designated CHICL: March 18, 1987
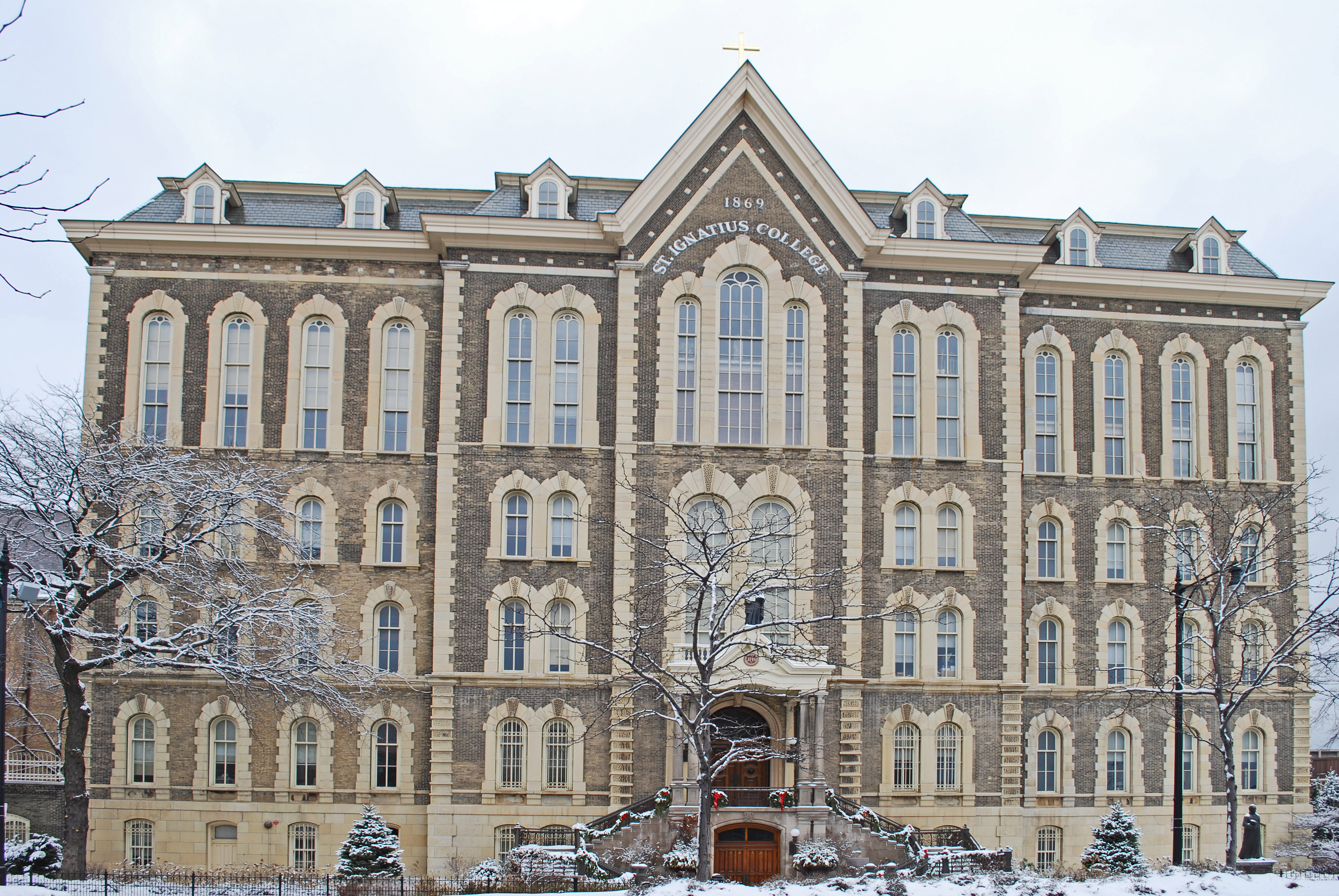
- Exterior of St. Ignatius College Prep in December 2010

Saint Ignatius College Prep is a private, coeducational Jesuit college-preparatory school located in the Near West Side neighborhood of Chicago, Illinois. The school was founded in Chicago in 1869 by Fr. Arnold Damen, S.J., a Dutch missionary to the United States. Saint Ignatius College Prep is Chicago's flagship Jesuit high school and one of the preeminent Catholic college preparatory schools in the United States.

== Campus ==
The campus of Saint Ignatius College Prep is listed on the U.S. National Register of Historic Places. The school's main building was designed by Canadian architect Toussaint Menard in Second Empire style and opened in 1870. The original school building is one of only five existing Chicago structures to predate the Great Fire of 1871.

The school began on two acres of land and now occupies a 26-acre campus. The campus includes the original building and modern facilities adjacent to the University of Illinois at Chicago, and is located 1.5 miles southwest of Chicago's Loop. Among the unique spaces is the 1887-88 Brunswick Room featuring elaborate cabinets and woodwork installed by the Brunswick Company for the school's natural history museum, the Foglia Library, the “Chicago gallery” of architectural artifacts in the Driehaus building, and Father Damen's office. Added to the National Register of Historic Places in 1977, St. Ignatius College Prep was designated a Chicago Landmark in 1987.

== History ==
=== Inception ===
In 1836, the Dutch Jesuit Fr. Arnold Damen, S.J. (March 20, 1815, Leur, Netherlands – January 1, 1890, Omaha, Nebraska), was recruited to work with Native Americans in the Dakotas by Fr. Peter De Smet, S.J. In 1844 he was ordained a priest in Missouri. In 1857, Damen was first assigned to Chicago to start a parish for Irish immigrants on Chicago's near-West Side, then an area of the sprawling prairie. The construction of the Holy Family Church was completed in 1860.

The culmination of Father Arnold J. Damen, S.J.'s work in Chicago, the St. Ignatius campus was opened in 1870 as St. Ignatius College. Loyola University originated from this institution but, since 1922, St. Ignatius has operated solely as a college preparatory school. The Second Empire-style edifice is among the oldest in the city, a rare and distinctive example of institutional designs pre-dating the Chicago Fire of 1871. It was designated a Chicago Landmark in 1987.

== Admissions ==
=== Demographics ===
The demographic breakdown by race/ethnicity of the 1,373 students enrolled for the 2023–2024 school year was:

Enrollment by Race/Ethnicity 2019–2020
White	Hispanic	Black	Two or More Races	Asian	American Indian/Alaska Native
924	271	125	104	64	4

== Extracurricular activities ==
=== Athletics ===
Saint Ignatius competes in the Chicago Catholic League (CCL) and the Girls Catholic Athletic Conference (GCAC) and is a member of the Illinois High School Association (IHSA), which governs most sports and competitive activities in the state. The school's teams are stylized as the "Wolfpack".

== Notable alumni ==
- Chloe Bennet (2010), actress and singer known
- Charles Bidwill, owner of the Chicago Cardinals (1933–47); inducted in 1967 into the Pro Football Hall of Fame
- Lawrence Biondi (1957), President of St. Louis University
- Joseph A. Bracken (1948), Jesuit philosopher
- Andre Braugher (1980), was an American actor. He was best known for his roles as Detective Frank Pembleton in the police drama series Homicide: Life on the Street (1993–1999), used car salesman Owen Thoreau Jr. in the comedy-drama series Men of a Certain Age (2009–2011), and Captain Raymond Holt in the police comedy series Brooklyn Nine-Nine (2013–2021).
- Tom Campbell (1969), California politician
- Charles Comiskey (1877), American professional baseball player, manager, and team owner.
- John P. Daley (1965), Cook County Commissioner
- William M. Daley (1966), former White House Chief of Staff under Barack Obama and former U.S. Secretary of Commerce (1997–2000)
- Richard Driehaus (1960), businessman and philanthropist; namesake of the Driehaus Prize given in architecture
- John Joseph Duda (1995), actor
- Nnanna Egwu (2011), professional basketball player, former center for Illinois Fighting Illini
- Kenard Gibbs (1982), Chief x Executive Officer of Soul Train Holdings and co-founder of MadVision Entertainment.
- Mellody Hobson (1987), Co-CEO of Ariel Investments; also TV correspondent in the field of finance; married to filmmaker George Lucas
- Joseph D. Kearney (1982), dean at Marquette University Law School
- Mary Kwasny (née Morrissey, 1988), biostatistician at Northwestern University
- Dan Lipinski (1984), former U.S. Representative representing Illinois's 3rd congressional district (2005–2021)
- Michael Madigan (1960), former Speaker of the Illinois House of Representatives
- John J. McNichols, Illinois state representative and lawyer
- Stanley Miarka, Negro league baseball second baseman
- John Mulaney (2000), Emmy-winning standup comedian and former writer on Saturday Night Live
- Bob Newhart (1947), actor and comedian (Newhart, The Bob Newhart Show)
- Gina Rodriguez (2002), Golden Globe winner, actor
- Marty Russo, Former United States Representative.
- Justin Scott (2024), college football defensive tackle for the Miami Hurricanes
- Casey Siemaszko, actor best known for his starring roles in Three O'Clock High and Young Guns.
- Michael Sorrell (1984), President of Paul Quinn College.
- Todd Stroger (1981), former Cook County Board President
- Ed Sweeney, (1905), starting catcher for New York Yankees
- Robin Tunney (1990), actress
- Michael Wilbon (1976), sports columnist for The Washington Post and host, commentator, and analyst for ESPN.
- Jamila Woods (2007), singer, songwriter, and poet

== Notable faculty ==
- David Abidor (born 1992), Men's Varsity assistant soccer coach (Jul 2021 - Jul 2022), and soccer player
- Johnny Bach (2010–2011), Men's basketball volunteer assistant coach

== See also ==
- List of Jesuit sites
