= Koch Foods =

American multinational food company

- Type: Private
- Industry: Food processing and distribution
- Founded: 1973
- Headquarters: Park Ridge, Illinois, U.S.
- Key people: Joseph Grendys
- Products: Poultry
- Owner: Joseph Grendys
- Website: kochfoods.com

Koch Foods is a food processor and distributor in Park Ridge, Illinois that as of December 2019 is listed by Forbes magazine as No. 125 on the list of the largest private companies in the U.S. As of October 2014, the company has a revenue of $3 billion and approximately 14,000 employees. The company is owned by Joseph Grendys.

== History ==
The company was founded in 1973. Until 1985, it was a "one-room" chicken processing outfit with 13 employees, primarily de-boning and cutting. Koch Foods began growing with the addition of feed mills and slaughterhouses. Koch is an international poultry processor which deals in fresh and frozen chicken. The company does business under the Koch Foods, Antioch Farms, Preferred Foods, and Rogers Royal brands. It has private label products and is a supplier for Burger King, Kroger, and Walmart.

Despite similarities in the names and the fact that both were founded by men named Fred Koch, Koch Foods has no relation to Koch, Inc. (founded by Fred C. Koch) or the Koch brothers; their founders are two different people.

== Locations ==
The company has facilities in these locations: Franklin Park, Illinois; Ashland, Alabama; Gadsden, Alabama; Montgomery, Alabama; Sylacauga, Alabama; Fairfield, Ohio; Forest, Mississippi; McComb, Mississippi; Morton, Mississippi; Chattanooga, Tennessee; Morristown, Tennessee; and Pine Mountain Valley, Georgia. In 2017 Koch Foods announced plans to build a $40 million feed mill in Roanoke, Alabama. In 2019 Koch announced that Roanoke, Alabama was no longer the target location for the feed mill. Instead, the company announced plans to build a modern grain storage and distribution facility in Attalla, Alabama.

== Controversies ==
=== Racial discrimination against farmers ===
Koch has been accused of discriminating against black contract farmers and retaliating against those who spoke out. From 2009 to 2015, the company went from having contracts with four black farmers in Mississippi to having none. USDA investigators found "evidence of unjust discrimination" against black farmers by Koch.

=== U.S. Equal Employment Opportunity Commission lawsuit ===
In 2012 the U.S. Equal Employment Opportunity Commission brought a class employment discrimination lawsuit against Koch alleging harassment of workers and discrimination based on national origin and race at Koch's Morton, Mississippi plant. The lawsuit alleged that workers were “subjected to touching and sexually suggestive comments, were hit, were charged money for normal everyday work activities” among other things. In 2018 Koch Foods paid $3,750,000 plus other relief to settle the case.

=== Use of undocumented labor ===
On August 28, 2007, federal authorities raided a chicken processing plant operated by Koch Foods in Fairfield, Ohio and detained 161 undocumented workers. After the raid and subsequent investigation, Koch Foods paid a fine on February 12, 2010 of $536,046 for violating federal immigration law. According to a 2010 ICE press release, the company cooperated and began using E-Verify, an Internet-based system allowing an employer to verify a person's work eligibility.

On August 7, 2019, federal authorities raided seven chicken processing plants operated by Koch Foods and four other companies in Mississippi and detained 680 undocumented workers. The exact number arrested at the Koch facilities has not been specified but authorities used five buses to transfer detainees from the plant to a hangar at a nearby airbase for processing. Homeland Security Investigations has faced criticism because the raid occurred on Mississippi's first day of school. According to the mayor of Jackson, Mississippi no managers or owners responsible for hiring unauthorized immigrants in such high numbers were charged. The company announced a job fair to be held on the first day of the week after the raids.

=== Price fixing ===
On May, 19, 2021, Norman W. Fries, Inc (Claxton Poultry Farms) in addition to Koch Foods and four executives (on July 28, 2021) were indicted by a federal grand jury of Conspiracy to Restrain Trade; the Department of Justice alleged that Koch Foods and Fries were conspiring to fix the price of broiler chicken to suppress and eliminate competition.
